= Buffalo Bulls football statistical leaders =

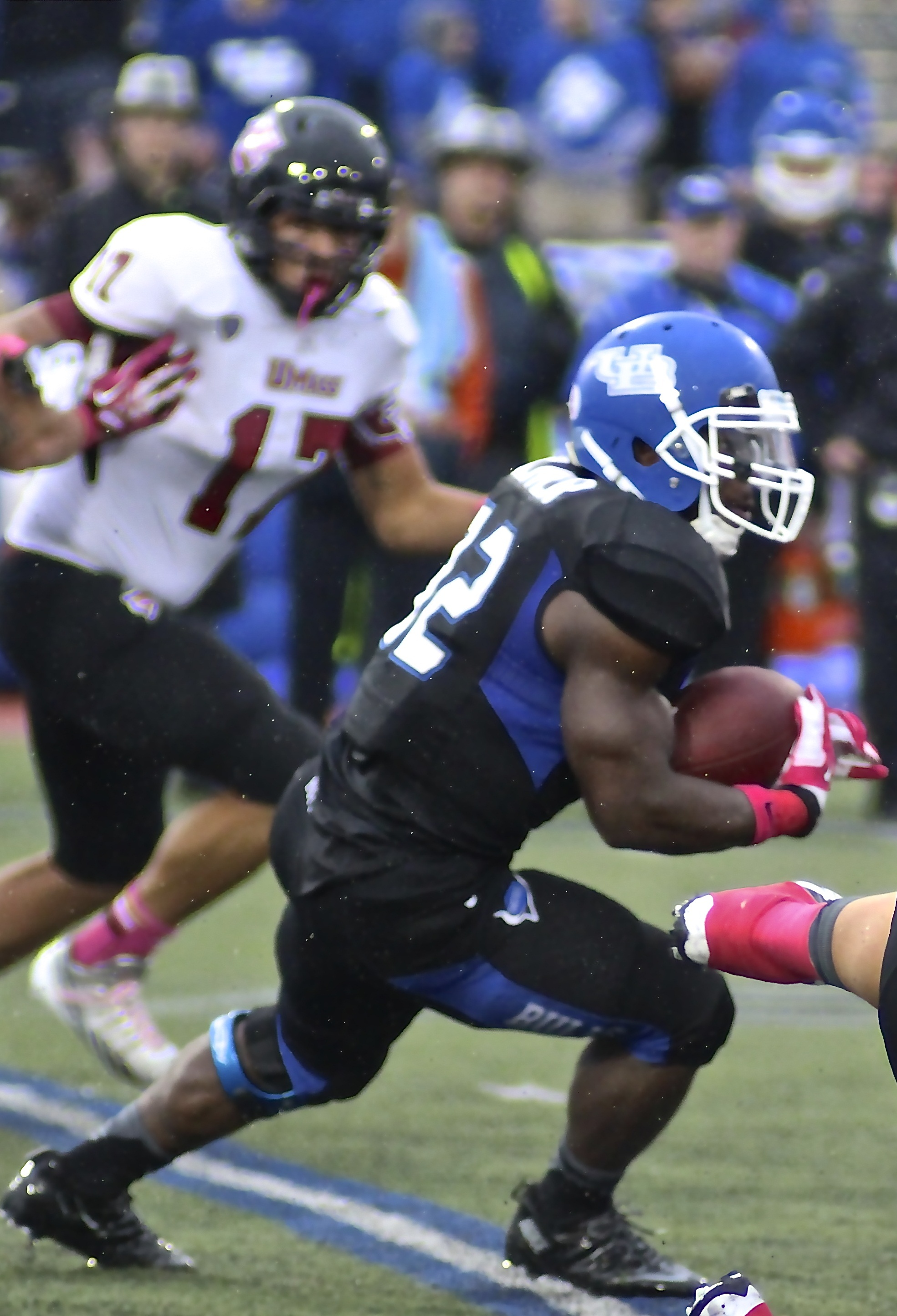
Career leader in rushing yards, Branden Oliver

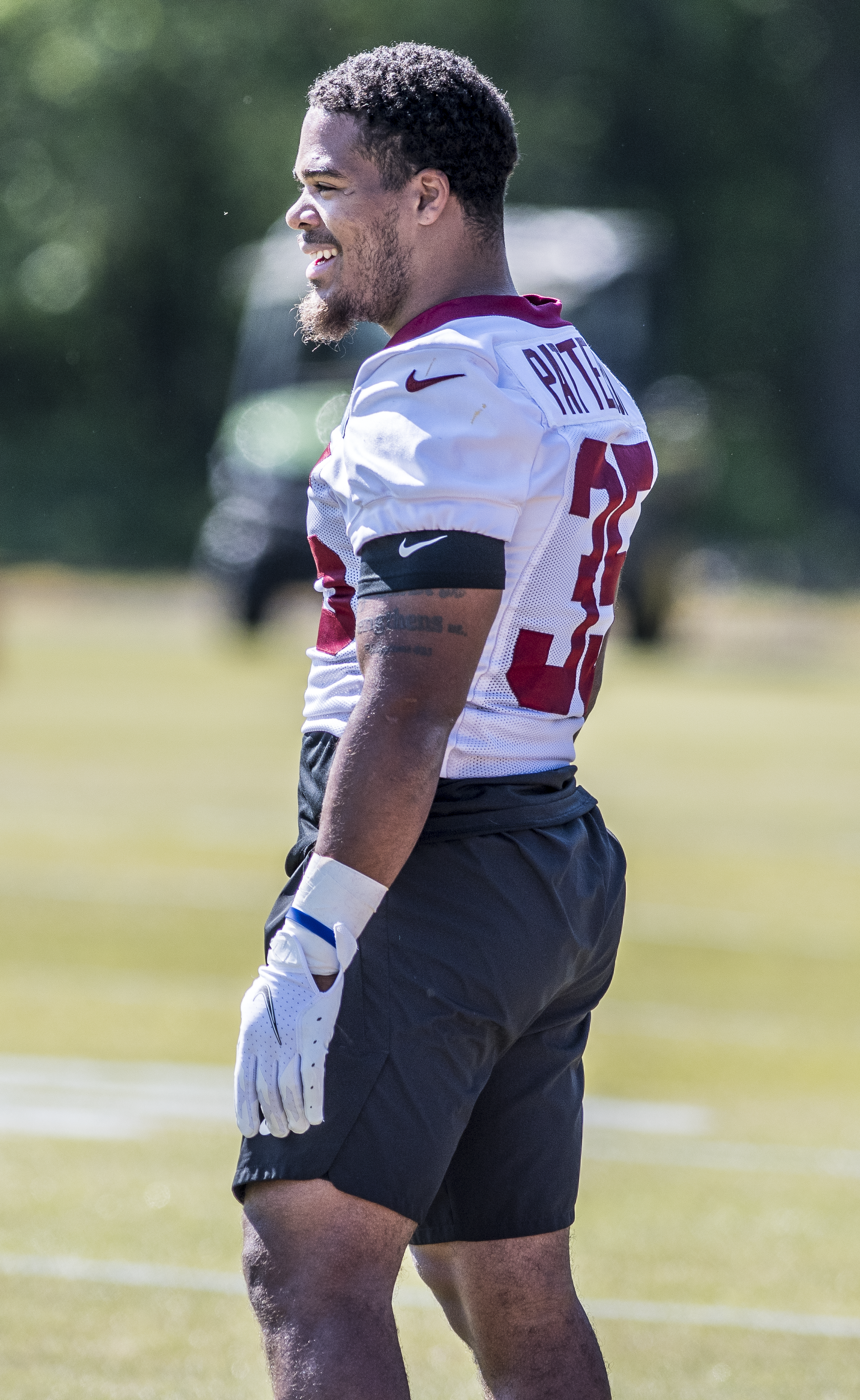
Career leader in rushing touchdowns, Jaret Patterson

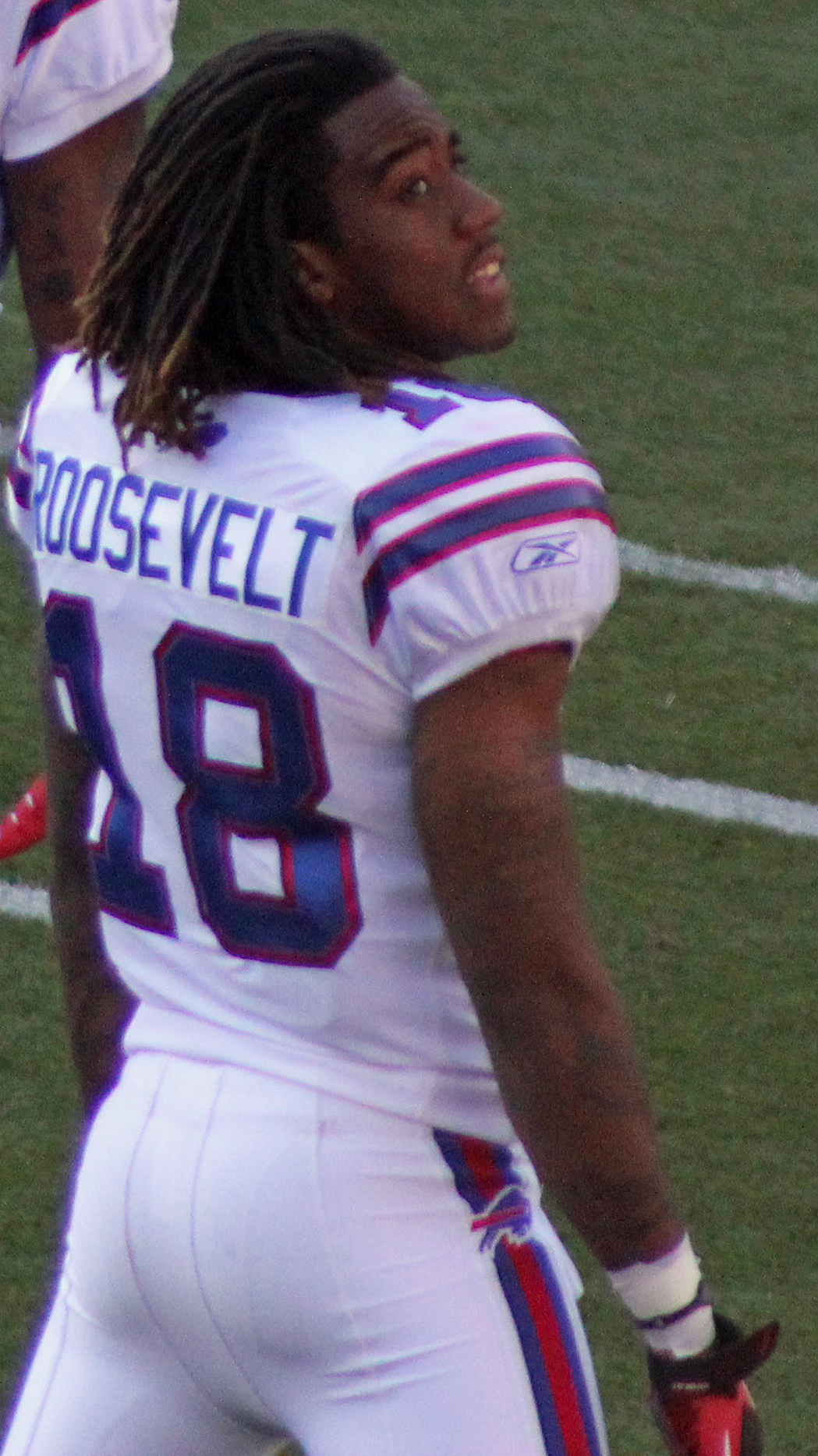
Career leader in receptions and receiving yards, Naaman Roosevelt

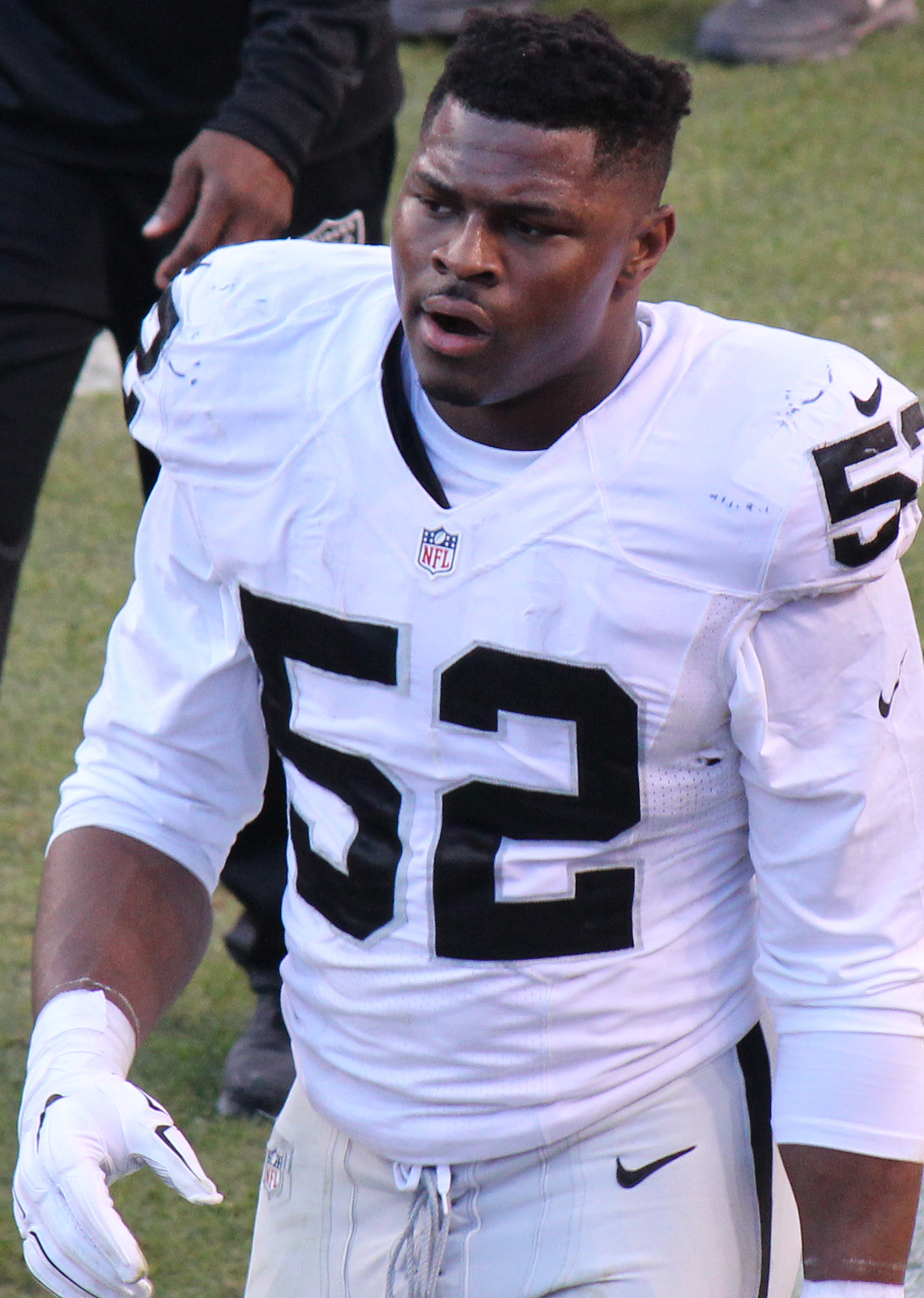
Career leader in sacks, Khalil Mack

The Buffalo Bulls football statistical leaders are individual statistical leaders of the Buffalo Bulls football program in various categories, including passing, rushing, receiving, total offense, defensive stats, and kicking. Within those areas, the lists identify single-game, single-season, and career leaders. The Bulls represent the University at Buffalo, The State University of New York (UB) in the Mid-American Conference of NCAA Division I FBS.

Passing leaders: Buffalo's career leader in passing yardage is Joe Licata with 9,485 passing yards from 2012 to 2015. Drew Willy holds the career record for single-season passing yards with 3,304 in 2008. Joe Licata is Buffalo's career leader in passing touchdowns, with 76 touchdown passes. Licata also holds the records for single-season passing touchdowns, with 29 in 2014, and the record for single-game passing yards, with 497 yards against Toledo in 2013. Marty Barrett is Buffalo's all-time leader in single game passing touchdowns, with 6 touchdown passes in a 1983 game against Alfred.

Rushing leaders: Buffalo's career leader in rushing yards is Branden Oliver with 4,049 rushing yards from 2010 to 2013. All other significant school records for rushing are held by Jaret Patterson, who played for the Bulls from 2018 to 2020. Patterson ended his UB career with 52 touchdowns, setting single-season records of 1,799 yards and 19 touchdowns in 2019 and equaling his touchdowns record in 2020. In the Bulls' 2020 game against Kent State, Patterson set new single-game school records with 409 yards and an FBS record-tying 8 touchdowns.

Receiving leaders: Naaman Roosevelt holds Buffalo's receiving records for most career receiving yards (3,551) and receptions (268). During Roosevelt's time with the Bulls from 2006 to 2009, he also set the single-season records for receptions (104), receiving yards (1,402), and receiving touchdowns (13), all set in the 2008 season. Buffalo's career leader in receiving touchdowns is Alex Neutz, who caught 31 touchdown passes while playing for the Bulls from 2010 to 2013. Chaz Ahmed and James Starks share Buffalo's single-game record for receptions with 13, with Ahmed setting the record in 1990 against Mercyhurst, and Starks matching it in 2008 against Akron. Buffalo's record for single-game receiving touchdowns is 4, and is shared between Chris D'Amico and Alex Neutz, with D'Amico setting the mark in 1983 against Alfred, and Neutz matching it in 2012 against Morgan State. Joe D'Amico holds Buffalo's record for single-game receiving yards, with 218 in a 1981 game against Cortland.

Defensive leaders: Buffalo's career leader in tackles is Davonte Shannon with 461 tackles from 2007 to 2010. Khalil Mack holds Buffalo's all-time lead in sacks, with 28.5 sacks from 2010 to 2013. Steve Nappo is the Bulls career leader in interceptions, with 19 from 1984 to 1986. Nappo also holds Buffalo's single-season record for interceptions, with 13 in 1986. Craig Guest is Buffalo's single-season leader in tackles, with 161 in 1995, and Vince Canosa holds the Bulls single-season record for sacks with 12.5 in 1993.

Historical caveats. Although Buffalo began competing in intercollegiate football in 1894, the school's official record book considers the "modern era" to have begun in 1949. Records from before this year are often incomplete and inconsistent, and they are generally not included in these lists.

These lists are dominated by more recent players for several reasons:

- Since 1949, seasons have increased from 10 games to 11 and then 12 games in length.
- Buffalo did not field a varsity football team during 1904–1914, 1943–1945, or 1971–1976.
- The NCAA didn't allow freshmen to play varsity football until 1972 (with the exception of the World War II years), allowing players to have four-year careers.
- Bowl games only began counting toward single-season and career statistics in 2002. The Bulls have played in five bowl games since then, the 2009 International Bowl, 2013 Famous Idaho Potato Bowl, 2018 Dollar General Bowl, 2019 Bahamas Bowl, and 2020 Camellia Bowl, allowing players to accumulate statistics for an additional game in those seasons.
- In two of their bowl seasons, 2008 and 2018, the Bulls also played in the MAC Championship Game, giving players in those seasons yet another game in which to accumulate statistics. They played in that game a third time in 2020, but only played 5 regular-season games due to COVID-19.
- Due to COVID-19 issues, the NCAA ruled that the 2020 season would not count against the athletic eligibility of any football player, giving everyone who played in that season the opportunity for five years of eligibility instead of the normal four.

These lists are updated through the end of the 2025 season.

== Passing ==
=== Passing yards ===
Career
Rank	Player	Yards	Years
1	Joe Licata	9,485	2012 2013 2014 2015
2	Drew Willy	8,748	2005 2006 2007 2008
3	Cliff Scott	7,578	1991 1992 1993 1994
4	Tyree Jackson	6,999	2015 2016 2017 2018
5	Marty Barrett	6,945	1980 1981 1982 1983
6	Joe Freedy	5,912	1998 1999 2000 2001
7	Cole Snyder	5,139	2022 2023
8	Chad Salisbury	4,947	1997 1998
9	Kyle Vantrease	4,755	2017 2018 2019 2020 2021
10	Frank Reilly	4,255	1988 1989 1990

Single-season
Rank	Player	Yards	Year
1	Drew Willy	3,304	2008
2	Tyree Jackson	3,131	2018
3	Cole Snyder	3,030	2022
4	Joe Licata	2,969	2015
5	Chad Salisbury	2,889	1997
6	Joe Licata	2,824	2013
7	Zach Maynard	2,694	2009
8	Joe Licata	2,647	2014
9	Drew Willy	2,572	2007
10	Ta'Quan Roberson	2,520	2025

Single game
Rank	Player	Yards	Year	Opponent
1	Drew Anderson	597	2017	Western Michigan
2	Joe Licata	497	2013	Toledo
3	Cliff Scott	490	1992	New Haven
4	Chad Salisbury	459	1997	Massachusetts
5	Chad Salisbury	445	1997	Illinois State
6	Chad Salisbury	418	1997	West Chester
7	Jim Rodriguez	417	1978	Coast Guard
8	Mark Taylor	411	1996	New Haven
9	Tyree Jackson	406	2017	Bowling Green State
10	Chazz Anderson	404	2011	Northern Illinois

=== Passing touchdowns ===
Career
Rank	Player	TDs	Years
1	Joe Licata	76	2012 2013 2014 2015
2	Drew Willy	52	2005 2006 2007 2008
3	Tyree Jackson	49	2015 2016 2017 2018
4	Marty Barrett	44	1980 1981 1982 1983
5	Cliff Scott	43	1991 1992 1993 1994
6	Joe Freedy	32	1998 1999 2000 2001
7	Chad Salisbury	31	1997 1998
	Cole Snyder	31	2022 2023
9	Frank Reilly	27	1988 1989 1990
10	Gordon Bukaty	25	1958 1959 1960
	Kyle Vantrease	25	2017 2018 2019 2020 2021

Single-season
Rank	Player	TDs	Year
1	Joe Licata	29	2014
2	Tyree Jackson	28	2018
3	Drew Willy	25	2008
4	Joe Licata	24	2013
5	C.J. Ogbonna	19	2024
6	Marty Barrett	18	1983
	Cliff Scott	18	1992
	Zach Maynard	18	2009
	Cole Snyder	18	2022
10	Ta'Quan Roberson	17	2025

Single game
Rank	Player	TDs	Year	Opponent
1	Drew Anderson	7	2017	Western Michigan
2	Marty Barrett	6	1983	Alfred
	Tyree Jackson	6	2018	Delaware State
4	Cliff Scott	5	1992	New Haven
	Joe Licata	5	2014	Army
6	Marty Barrett	4	1981	Cortland
	Drew Willy	4	2008	Texas El-Paso
	Zach Maynard	4	2009	Pittsburgh
	Jerry Davis	4	2010	Rhode Island
	Alex Zordich	4	2012	Morgan State
	Joe Licata	4	2013	Toledo
	Joe Licata	4	2014	Akron
	Joe Licata	4	2014	Massachusetts
	Kyle Vantrease	4	2020	Miami (OH)
	Cole Snyder	4	2023	Liberty

== Rushing ==
=== Rushing yards ===
Career
Rank	Player	Yards	Years
1	Branden Oliver	4,049	2010 2011 2012 2013
2	Jaret Patterson	3,884	2018 2019 2020
3	James Starks	3,140	2006 2007 2008
4	Anthony Swan	3,103	1994 1995 1996 1997
5	Kevin Marks	3,035	2018 2019 2020 2021
6	Alan Bell	3,002	1989 1990 1991 1992
7	Anthone Taylor	2,651	2011 2013 2014 2015
8	Jordan Johnson	2,212	2014 2015 2016
9	Al-Jay Henderson	2,134	2022 2023 2024 2025
10	O.D. Underwood	2,062	1986 1987

Single-season
Rank	Player	Yards	Year
1	Jaret Patterson	1,799	2019
2	Branden Oliver	1,535	2013
3	Anthone Taylor	1,403	2014
4	Branden Oliver	1,395	2011
5	James Starks	1,333	2008
6	O.D. Underwood	1,189	1986
7	Anthony Swan	1,117	1996
8	James Starks	1,103	2007
9	Al-Jay Henderson	1,078	2024
10	Dylan McDuffie	1,076	2021

Single game
Rank	Player	Yards	Year	Opponent
1	Jaret Patterson	409	2020	Kent State
2	Jaret Patterson	301	2020	Bowling Green
3	Jaret Patterson	298	2019	Bowling Green
4	Jordan Johnson	282	2016	Akron
5	Alan Bell	266	1991	Duquesne
6	Branden Oliver	249	2013	Ohio
7	Branden Oliver	238	2012	Morgan State
8	Anthone Taylor	237	2014	Massachusetts
9	Branden Oliver	235	2011	Akron
10	O.D. Underwood	232	1986	Rochester

=== Rushing touchdowns ===
Career
Rank	Player	TDs	Years
1	Jaret Patterson	52	2018 2019 2020
2	James Starks	34	2006 2007 2008
3	Branden Oliver	33	2010 2011 2012 2013
	Kevin Marks	33	2018 2019 2020 2021
5	Lee Jones	29	1965 1966 1967
	Anthony Swan	29	1994 1995 1996 1997
7	Alan Bell	26	1989 1990 1991 1992
8	O.D. Underwood	23	1986 1987
9	Cliff Scott	20	1991 1992 1993 1994
10	Jordan Johnson	19	2014 2015 2016
	Al-Jay Henderson	19	2022 2023 2024 2025

Single-season
Rank	Player	TDs	Year
1	Jaret Patterson	19	2019
	Jaret Patterson	19	2020
3	Lee Jones	16	1966
	James Starks	16	2008
5	O.D. Underwood	15	1986
	Branden Oliver	15	2013
7	Jaret Patterson	14	2018
8	Branden Oliver	13	2011
	Kevin Marks	13	2018
10	Lee Jones	12	1967
	Pat Whitehead	12	1982
	James Starks	12	2007
	Anthone Taylor	12	2014
	Jordan Johnson	12	2015

Single game
Rank	Player	TDs	Year	Opponent
1	Jaret Patterson	8	2020	Kent State
2	Lou Corriere	6	1942	Hobart
	Jaret Patterson	6	2019	Bowling Green
4	Anthony Swan	5	1995	Fordham
	Jaret Patterson	4	2019	Toledo
6	Pat Whitehead	4	1982	Albany
	Anthony Swan	4	1996	Illinois State
	Branden Oliver	4	2013	Kent State
	Jaret Patterson	4	2020	Bowling Green

== Receiving ==
=== Receptions ===
Career
Rank	Player	Rec	Years
1	Naaman Roosevelt	268	2006 2007 2008 2009
2	Drew Haddad	240	1996 1997 1998 1999
3	Alex Neutz	195	2010 2011 2012 2013
4	Brett Hamlin	185	2005 2006 2007 2008 2009
5	Kali Watkins	145	1995 1996 1997 1998
6	Chris D'Amico	143	1981 1982 1983 1984
7	Anthony Johnson	133	2017 2018
8	Rusty Knapp	129	1990 1991 1992 1993
9	James Starks	127	2006 2007 2008
10	Frank Price	125	1977 1978 1979 1980
	Andre Forde	125	1999 2000 2001 2002
	Quian Williams	125	2021 2022

Single-season
Rank	Player	Rec	Year
1	Naaman Roosevelt	104	2008
2	Drew Haddad	85	1999
3	Anthony Johnson	76	2018
4	Naaman Roosevelt	70	2009
5	Drew Haddad	67	1997
	Drew Haddad	67	1998
7	Alex Neutz	65	2012
8	Brett Hamlin	64	2009
	Quian Williams	64	2021
	Justin Marshall	64	2022

Single game
Rank	Player	Rec	Year	Opponent
1	Chaz Ahmed	13	1990	Mercyhurst
	James Starks	13	2008	Akron
	Antonio Nunn	13	2020	Ball State
4	Gary Quatrani	12	1978	Alfred
	Kali Watkins	12	1997	Illinois State
	Drew Haddad	12	1998	Cornell
	Andre Forde	12	2002	Ohio
	Brett Hamlin	12	2009	Pittsburgh
	Naaman Roosevelt	12	2009	Akron
	Chance Morrow	12	2026	Miami (OH)

=== Receiving yards ===
Career
Rank	Player	Yards	Years
1	Naaman Roosevelt	3,551	2006 2007 2008 2009
2	Drew Haddad	3,409	1996 1997 1998 1999
3	Alex Neutz	3,094	2010 2011 2012 2013
4	Anthony Johnson	2,367	2017 2018
5	Chris D'Amico	2,331	1981 1982 1983 1984
6	Kali Watkins	2,260	1995 1996 1997 1998
7	Brett Hamlin	2,190	2005 2006 2007 2008 2009
8	Rusty Knapp	2,105	1990 1991 1992 1993
9	Frank Price	1,810	1977 1978 1979 1980
10	Andre Forde	1,775	1999 2000 2001 2002

Single-season
Rank	Player	Yards	Year
1	Naaman Roosevelt	1,402	2008
2	Anthony Johnson	1,356	2017
3	Drew Haddad	1,158	1997
4	Drew Haddad	1,058	1999
5	Alex Neutz	1,024	2013
6	Alex Neutz	1,015	2012
7	Anthony Johnson	1,011	2018
8	Doc Smith	996	1992
9	Nik McMillan	981	2025
10	Naaman Roosevelt	954	2009

Single game
Rank	Player	Yards	Year	Opponent
1	Anthony Johnson	238	2018	Miami (Ohio)
2	Joe D'Amico	218	1981	Cortland
3	Andre Forde	202	2002	Ohio
4	Chance Morrow	199	2026	Miami (OH)
5	Alex Neutz	197	2013	Baylor
6	Gary Quatrani	196	1978	Coast Guard
7	Anthony Johnson	197	2017	Western Michigan
8	KJ Osborn	195	2018	Eastern Michigan
9	Antonio Nunn	182	2020	Ball State

=== Receiving touchdowns ===
Career
Rank	Player	TDs	Years
1	Alex Neutz	31	2010 2011 2012 2013
2	Naaman Roosevelt	28	2006 2007 2008 2009
3	Anthony Johnson	25	2017 2018
4	Chris D'Amico	19	1981 1982 1983 1984
	Jamie Gasparre	19	1996 1997
6	Drew Haddad	16	1996 1997 1998 1999
7	Kali Watkins	15	1995 1996 1997 1998
	Andre Forde	15	1999 2000 2001 2002
	Ron Willoughby	15	2012 2013 2014 2015
10	Edmond Gicewicz	14	1949 1950 1951
	Frank Price	14	1977 1978 1979 1980
	Victor Snow	14	2023 2024 2025

Single-season
Rank	Player	TDs	Year
1	Anthony Johnson	14	2017
2	Naaman Roosevelt	13	2008
3	Alex Neutz	12	2013
4	Alex Neutz	11	2012
	Anthony Johnson	11	2018
6	Chris D'Amico	10	1983
	Doc Smith	10	1992
	Jamie Gasparre	10	1996
9	Tom Frank	9	1983
	Jamie Gasparre	9	1997
	Naaman Roosevelt	9	2009
	Ron Willoughby	9	2014
	Justin Marshall	9	2022

Single game
Rank	Player	TDs	Year	Opponent
1	Chris D'Amico	4	1983	Alfred
	Alex Neutz	4	2012	Morgan State
	Anthony Johnson	4	2017	Ball State

== Total offense ==
Total offense is the sum of passing and rushing statistics. It does not include receiving or returns.

=== Total offense yards ===
Career
Rank	Player	Yards	Years
1	Joe Licata	9,301	2012 2013 2014 2015
2	Drew Willy	8,639	2005 2006 2007 2008
3	Cliff Scott	8,479	1991 1992 1993 1994
4	Tyree Jackson	7,756	2015 2016 2017 2018
5	Marty Barrett	6,466	1980 1981 1982 1983
6	Joe Freedy	5,573	1998 1999 2000 2001
7	Cole Snyder	5,373	2022 2023
8	Kyle Vantrease	4,960	2017 2018 2019 2020 2021
9	Chad Salisbury	4,879	1997 1998
10	Frank Reilly	4,186	1988 1989 1990

Single season
Rank	Player	Yards	Year
1	Tyree Jackson	3,292	2018
2	Drew Willy	3,189	2008
3	Cole Snyder	3,176	2022
4	Zach Maynard	2,994	2009
5	Joe Licata	2,909	2015
6	Chad Salisbury	2,797	1997
7	Chazz Anderson	2,763	2011
8	Joe Licata	2,760	2013
9	C.J. Ogbonna	2,724	2024
10	Joe Licata	2,641	2014

Single game
Rank	Player	Yards	Year	Opponent
1	Drew Anderson	610	2017	Western Michigan
2	Cliff Scott	536	1992	New Haven

=== Touchdowns responsible for ===
"Touchdowns responsible for" is the NCAA's official term for combined passing and rushing touchdowns.

Career
Rank	Player	TDs	Years
1	Joe Licata	80	2012 2013 2014
2	Tyree Jackson	65	2015 2016 2017 2018
3	Cliff Scott	63	1991 1992 1993 1994
4	Drew Willy	59	2005 2006 2007 2008
5	Jaret Patterson	52	2018 2019 2020
6	Marty Barrett	46	1980 1981 1982 1983
7	Kyle Vantrease	38	2017 2018 2019 2020 2021
8	Gordon Bukaty	37	1958 1959 1960
9	Cole Snyder	36	2022 2023
10	Joe Freedy	34	1998 1999 2000 2001
	James Starks	34	2006 2007 2008
	Branden Oliver	34	2010 2011 2012 2013

Single season
Rank	Player	TDs	Year
1	Joe Licata	31	2014
2	Drew Willy	29	2008
3	Cliff Scott	27	1992
	C.J. Ogbonna	27	2024
5	Joe Licata	25	2013
6	Cole Snyder	22	2022
7	Ta'Quan Roberson	20	2025
8	Zach Maynard	19	2009
	Chazz Anderson	19	2011
	Jaret Patterson	19	2019
	Jaret Patterson	19	2020

=== Scoring ===
Career
Rank	Player	Points	Years
1	Alex McNulty	369	2018 2019 2020 2021 2022 2023
2	Jaret Patterson	318	2018 2019 2020
3	Adam Mitcheson	284	2015 2016 2017 2018
4	A.J. Principe	265	2007 2008 2009 2010
5	Patrick Clarke	232	2011 2012 2013 2014
6	James Starks	222	2006 2007 2008
7	Branden Oliver	204	2010 2011 2012 2013
8	Kevin Marks	198	2018 2019 2020 2021
9	Alex Neutz	186	2010 2011 2012 2013
10	Alan Bell	184	1989 1990 1991 1992

== Defense ==
=== Interceptions ===
Career
Rank	Player	Ints	Years
1	Steve Nappo	19	1984 1985 1986
2	John Bernard	18	1980 1981 1982 1983
3	Andy Hurley	16	1983 1984
4	Dan Sella	12	1964 1965 1966
	Tim Hurd	12	1965 1966 1967
	Mark Graham	12	2000 2001 2002 2003
	Mike Newton	12	2006 2007 2008 2009
8	Gordon Bukaty	11	1958 1959 1960
	Domonic Cook	11	2007 2008 2009 2010
10	Craig Rohlfs	10	1998 1999 2000 2001
	Davaonte Shannon	10	2007 2008 2009 2010

Single-season
Rank	Player	Ints	Year
1	Steve Nappo	13	1986
2	John Bernard	12	1983
3	Andy Hurley	9	1983
4	Jon Williams	8	1988
5	Andy Hurley	7	1984
	Marcus Fuqua	7	2022
7	Gordon Bukaty	6	1959
	Tom Hurd	6	1966
	Dave Short	6	1990
	Mark Graham	6	2002
	Domonic Cook	6	2010

=== Tackles ===
Career
Rank	Player	Tackles	Years
1	Davonte Shannon	461	2007 2008 2009 2010
2	Craig Guest	455	1993 1994 1995 1996
3	Khalil Hodge	421	2016 2017 2018
4	Mike Laipple	402	1983 1984 1985 1986
5	James Patterson	400	2018 2019 2020 2021 2022
6	Shaun Dolac	391	2020 2021 2022 2023 2024
7	Pete Conley	376	1992 1993 1994 1995
8	Red Murdock	362	2022 2023 2024 2025
9	J.J. Gibson	357	2001 2002 2003 2004
10	Lee Skinner	344	2011 2012 2013 2014

Single-season
Rank	Player	Tackles	Year
1	Shaun Dolac	168	2024
2	Craig Guest	161	1995
3	Red Murdock	156	2024
4	Khalil Hodge	154	2017
5	Shaun Dolac	148	2022
6	Pete Conley	145	1995
7	Khalil Hodge	144	2018
8	Steve Wojciechowski	142	1987
	Red Murdock	142	2025
10	Craig Guest	136	1996

=== Sacks ===
Career
Rank	Player	Sacks	Years
1	Khalil Mack	28.5	2010 2011 2012 2013
2	Rich Dadabo	24.0	1989 1990 1991 1992
	Vince Canosa	24.0	1992 1993 1994 1995
4	Trevor Scott	19.0	2004 2005 2006 2007
5	Steven Means	18.5	2009 2010 2011 2012
6	Dave May	18.0	1983 1984 1985 1986
	Malcolm Koonce	18.0	2017 2018 2019 2020
8	Taylor Riggins	17.5	2018 2019 2021
9	Keith Hansen	16.0	1994 1995 1996 1997
10	Hardy Mitchell	15.5	1994 1995 1996 1997

Single-season
Rank	Player	Sacks	Year
1	Vince Canosa	12.5	1993
2	Dan Leo	11.0	1986
3	Tim Teicher	10.5	1987
	Khalil Mack	10.5	2013
5	Trevor Scott	10.0	2007
6	Kobe Stewart	9.5	2024
7	Rich Dadabo	9.0	1990
	Rich Dadabo	9.0	1992
	Keith Hansen	9.0	1996
	Anthony Scott	9.0	1996
	Duane Williams	9.0	2000
	Trevor Scott	9.0	2006
	Malcolm Koonce	9.0	2019

== Kicking ==
=== Field goals made ===
Career
Rank	Player	FGs	Years
1	Alex McNulty	60	2018 2019 2020 2021 2022 2023
2	Adam Mitcheson	48	2015 2016 2017 2018
3	A.J. Principe	44	2007 2008 2009 2010
4	Patrick Clarke	36	2011 2012 2013 2014
5	Dallas Pelz	35	2000 2001 2002 2003
6	Gerald Carlson	28	1993 1994 1995 1996
7	Mark Mozrall	22	1991 1992 1993 1994
8	Tom McLaughlin	20	1988 1989 1990 1991
9	Scott Keller	19	1997 1998 1999 2000

Single season
Rank	Player	FGs	Year
1	Alex McNulty	24	2022
2	Upton Bellenfant	18	2024
3	Gerald Carlson	17	1995
4	A.J. Principe	15	2007
	Adam Mitcheson	15	2017
6	Dallas Pelz	14	2003
	Jack Howes	14	2025
8	Patrick Clarke	13	2013
	Adam Mitcheson	13	2015
	Alex McNulty	13	2021

Single game
Rank	Player	FGs	Year	Opponent
1	Dallas Pelz	5	2003	Toledo

=== Field goal percentage ===
Career
Rank	Player	FG%	Years
1	Adam Tanalski	85.7%	2005 2006
2	Upton Bellenfant	85.7%	2024
3	Jack Howes	82.4%	2025
4	Dallas Pelz	72.9%	2000 2001 2002 2003
5	A.J. Principe	72.1%	2007 2008 2009 2010

Single season
Rank	Player	FG%	Year
1	Patrick Clarke	100.0%	2011
2	Adam Tanalski	85.7%	2006
	Alex McNulty	85.7%	2022
	Upton Bellenfant	85.7%	2024
5	Dallas Pelz	82.4%	2003
	Jack Howes	82.4%	2025
7	A.J. Principe	76.9%	2009
8	A.J. Principe	75.0%	2007
