= Naaman Roosevelt =

American football player (born 1987)

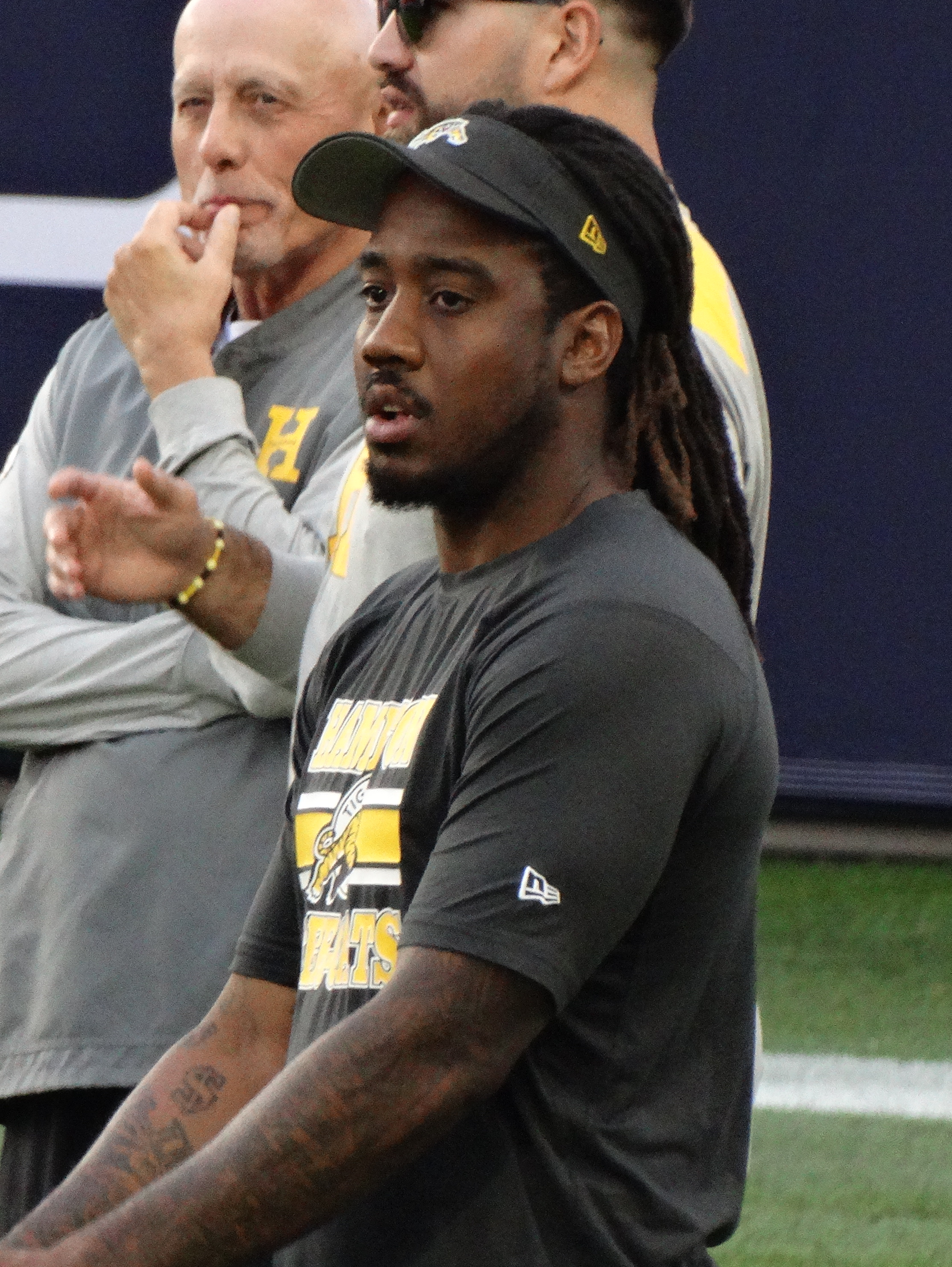
- Roosevelt with the Hamilton Tiger-Cats in 2024

Hamilton Tiger-Cats
- Title: Receivers coach

Personal information
- Born: December 24, 1987 (age 38); Buffalo, New York, U.S.
- Listed height: 6 ft 0 in (1.83 m)
- Listed weight: 195 lb (88 kg)

Career information
- High school: St. Joseph's Collegiate Institute (Tonawanda, New York)
- College: Buffalo (2006–2009)
- NFL draft: 2010: undrafted

Career history

Playing
- Buffalo Bills (2010–2012); Cleveland Browns (2013)*; Detroit Lions (2014)*; Buffalo Bills (2014)*; Saskatchewan Roughriders (2015–2019); Montreal Alouettes (2020)*; Winnipeg Blue Bombers (2021)*
- * Offseason or practice squad member only

Coaching
- Saskatchewan Roughriders (2023) Offensive assistant; Hamilton Tiger-Cats (2024–present) Receivers coach

Awards and highlights
- CFL West All-Star (2017); First-team All-MAC (2008); Third-team All-MAC (2007)

Career NFL statistics
- Games played: 16
- Receptions: 25
- Receiving yards: 396
- Receiving touchdowns: 1
- Stats at Pro Football Reference

Career CFL statistics
- Games played: 67
- Receptions: 301
- Receiving yards: 4,134
- Receiving touchdowns: 20
- Stats at CFL.ca

Naaman Ishhod Roosevelt (born December 24, 1987) is an American former professional football wide receiver who is currently the receivers coach for the Hamilton Tiger-Cats of the Canadian Football League (CFL). During his playing career, he was a member of the Buffalo Bills, Cleveland Browns, Detroit Lions, Saskatchewan Roughriders, Montreal Alouettes, and Winnipeg Blue Bombers. He played college football for the Buffalo Bulls.

== Early life ==
Roosevelt was raised in the East Side of Buffalo in an area which he described as violent. In that environment, he later said, it was difficult to think past the next day and his peers "didn't think about going to college and things like that." Roosevelt said that outlook changed when he was recruited to attend St. Joseph's Collegiate Institute, a private school in suburban Tonawanda.

At St. Joseph's, Roosevelt played basketball and football as a quarterback and kick returner. As a senior in 2005, he threw a Western New York record 35 touchdown passes and was named the Buffalo News' Player of the Year.

== College career ==
The University at Buffalo was the only school to offer Roosevelt a scholarship to play offense; New Hampshire offered him a scholarship to play cornerback. Roosevelt was the first player successfully recruited by new head coach Turner Gill. Roosevelt accepted the offer on the condition that he be allowed to compete for the starting quarterback role.

Roosevelt lost the quarterback job to returning sophomore starter Drew Willy. Roosevelt was converted to wide receiver as a freshman and started seven games, catching 31 passes and 2 touchdowns. In his second year, the wide receiver caught 63 passes and 4 touchdowns. In his junior season, Roosevelt dramatically increased his production, catching 104 passes, primarily from Willy.

On September 13, 2008, Roosevelt caught a Hail Mary pass from quarterback Drew Willy as time expired to beat the Temple Owls at UB Stadium. Also in his junior season, Buffalo won the 2008 MAC Championship Game against Nate Davis and the Ball State Cardinals. Roosevelt's 104 receptions was one short of the MAC Conference record at the time. His 13 touchdowns in 2008 set a school record.

In 2009, he caught 70 passes for 9 touchdowns. On September 19, 2009, he threw a 34-yard touchdown pass to tight end Jesse Rack against Central Florida. Although a star quarterback in high school, it was the only touchdown pass of his college career.

As of August 2022, Roosevelt still held school records for career receiving yards, career receptions, single-season receiving yards and single-season receptions. In February 2023, he was inducted into UB's athletics hall of fame.

== Professional career ==
Pre-draft measurables
Height	Weight	40-yard dash	10-yard split	20-yard split	20-yard shuttle	Three-cone drill	Vertical jump	Broad jump	Bench press
6 ft 0 1/8 in (1.83 m)	189 lb (86 kg)	4.60 s	1.63 s	2.75 s	4.16 s	6.95 s	36.0 in (0.91 m)	9 ft 8 in (2.95 m)	12 reps
All values from Pro Day

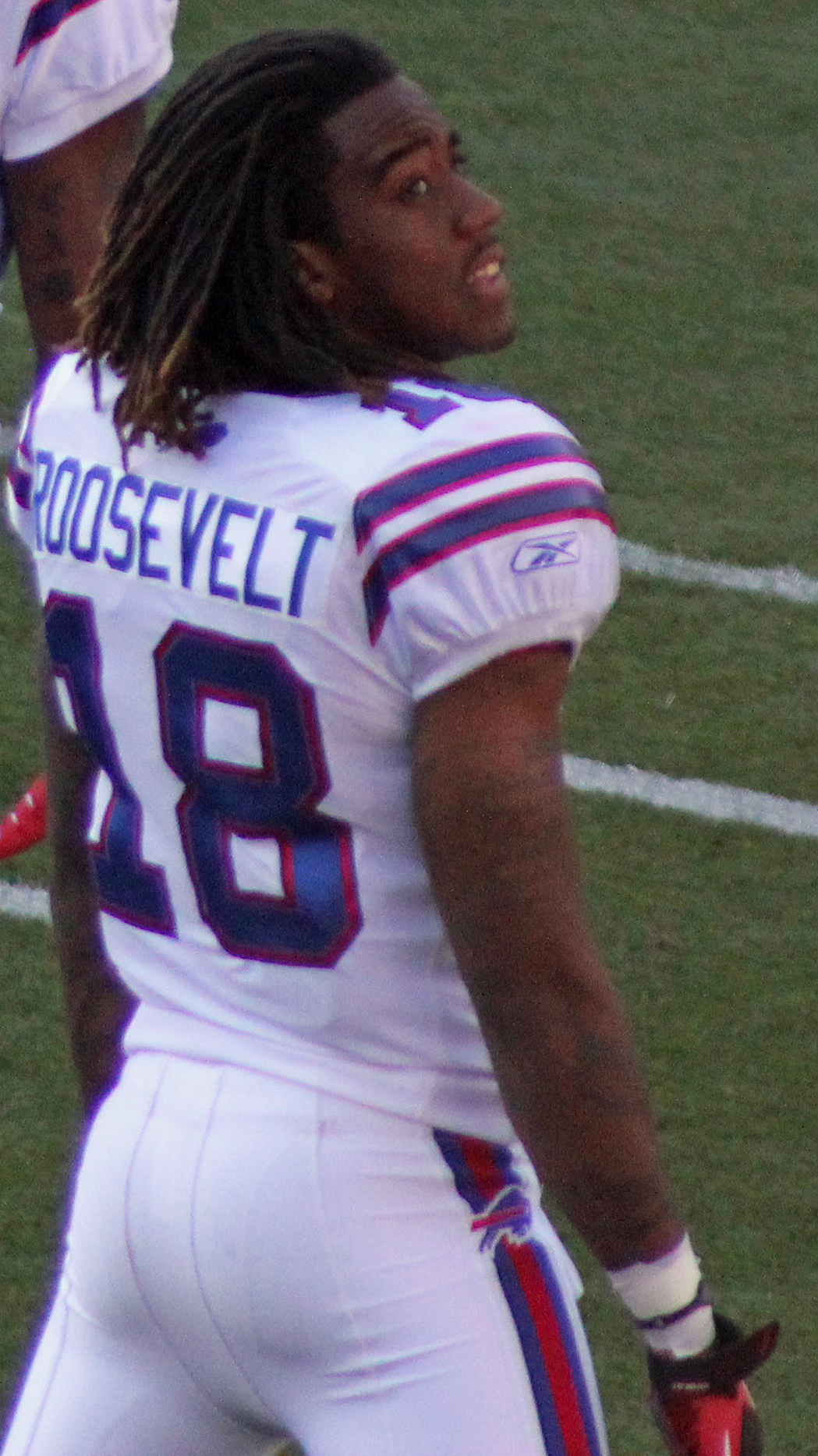
Roosevelt with the Buffalo Bills in 2011

=== Buffalo Bills (first stint) ===
Roosevelt went undrafted in the 2010 NFL draft. He was signed as an undrafted free agent by the Buffalo Bills on April 24. Roosevelt was cut by the Bills on final cuts on September 4, 2010, but signed to their practice squad on September 5, 2010. On November 27, 2010, Roosevelt was promoted to the active roster after coach Chan Gailey said he did an "excellent job" on the practice squad. He made his NFL debut the following day in a loss to the Pittsburgh Steelers. The following week, he recorded the only tackle of his NFL career, bringing down Greg Camarillo after a 17-yard punt return. On December 19, 2010, he was targeted with and caught the first passes of his NFL career, reeling in two of three throws from Ryan Fitzpatrick for 35 yards. He ended the season with a total of nine receptions for a total of 139 yards, one carry for three yards and two kick returns for 31 yards.

Before the start of the 2011 season, Roosevelt was again cut from the active roster and re-signed to the practice squad. Bills General Manager Buddy Nix said of the move "This year, we cut guys that were good players. We cut Naaman Roosevelt. We like Naaman. It got down to a numbers situation. We had six receivers, we normally have five." He appeared in his first game in the third week of the 2011 season. He caught at least one pass in each game between the fourth and tenth weeks of the season. On October 16, 2011, Roosevelt caught his first pro touchdown pass, a 60-yard catch-and-run at MetLife Stadium against the New York Giants. On August 31, 2012, he was cut by the Bills.

=== Cleveland Browns ===
On July 23, 2013, he was signed by the Cleveland Browns.

=== Detroit Lions ===
After the 2013 season, he was not re-signed and was signed after a tryout for the Detroit Lions on April 23, 2014.

=== Buffalo Bills (second stint) ===
After being let go by the Lions, Roosevelt resigned with the Bills on July 21, 2014. The Bills released Roosevelt on August 29, 2014. On October 3, 2014, the Bills re-signed Roosevelt to the practice squad. He was released from the practice squad on October 4, 2014.

=== Saskatchewan Roughriders ===
Roosevelt signed with the Saskatchewan Roughriders of the Canadian Football League on March 14, 2015. Roosevelt had a breakout year for the Roughriders in his second season in the CFL. He played in the first 11 games of the season before being placed on the six-game injured list. Following the season he was named the Riders Most Outstanding Player despite missing 7 games. Additionally, he accepted a two-year contract extension from the Riders. Roosevelt finished the 2016 season with 1,095 receiving yards, the ninth-highest total in the league. In Week 14 of the 2017 season Roosevelt took a helmet-to-helmet hit from Calgary's Tunde Adeleke and was placed on the team's six-game injured list. At the time of the injury Roosevelt was the Riders leading receiver, and had the fifth most receiving yards in the league with 923. Roosevelt was named a divisional All-Star for 2017 after another 1,000 yard season and 8 touchdown catches, but had a down year in 2018 with injuries to both himself, as well as several injuries to new starting quarterback Zach Collaros. The Roughriders offense had already taken hits prior to and during the regular season with the release of experienced pass catchers such as Rob Bagg, Chad Owens, Bakari Grant, and Duron Carter. Several days into free agency for 2019, Roosevelt turned down an offer from rival Winnipeg to sign a one-year extension with the Roughriders for roughly Can$160,000, as well as performance incentives to increase earnings. Roosevelt rewarded the Riders with a bounce-back year; he played his first season of all 18 games, and despite only one touchdown catch, he caught 77 passes for 946 yards, with which Roosevelt surpassed the 4,000 yard mark for his career, as well as making his 300th catch. Following the season he was not re-signed by the Riders and became a free agent on February 11, 2020.

=== Montreal Alouettes ===
On February 22, 2020, Roosevelt signed with the Montreal Alouettes. He signed a contract extension with the team on December 18, 2020. He was released on July 26, 2021.

=== Winnipeg Blue Bombers ===
On August 30, 2021, Roosevelt signed with the Winnipeg Blue Bombers. He was released by the Bombers' practice roster on November 19, 2021, without having appeared in a game for the team.

== Career statistics ==
=== CFL ===
Receiving		Regular season						Playoffs
Year	Team	Games	Rec.	Yards	Avg	Long	TD	Games	Rec.	Yards	Avg	Long	TD
2015	SSK	10	25	488	19.5	71	5	Did not qualify
2016	SSK	11	76	1,095	14.4	89	2	Did not qualify
2017	SSK	14	75	1,035	13.8	75	8	2	9	126	14.0	26	0
2018	SSK	14	48	570	11.9	40	4	1	7	79	11.3	17	0
2019	SSK	18	77	946	12.3	33	1	1	7	87	12.4	22	0
CFL totals		67	301	4,134	13.7	89	20	4	23	292	12.7	26	0

=== College ===
Year	Team	GP	Receiving				Kick Return			
Year	Team	GP	Rec	Yds	Avg	TD	Ret	Yds	Avg	TD
2006	Buffalo	12	31	429	13.8	2	28	724	25.9	1
2007	Buffalo	12	63	766	12.2	4	21	471	22.4	0
2008	Buffalo	14	104	1,402	13.5	13	7	108	15.4	0
2009	Buffalo	11	70	954	13.6	9	6	135	22.5	0
Totals		49	268	3,551	13.3	28	62	1,438	23.2	1

== Coaching career ==
=== Saskatchewan Roughriders ===
Roosevelt served as a "guest coach" at Roughriders training camp in 2022 and was hired as an offensive assistant coach prior to the 2023 season.

=== Hamilton Tiger-Cats ===
On February 2, 2024, it was announced that Roosevelt had joined the Hamilton Tiger-Cats of the CFL to serve as the team's receivers coach.

== Personal life ==
Roosevelt returned to UB and finished his bachelor's degree in sociology in 2022. He said he completed his degree as part of a larger goal of becoming a college football coach.
