= Anthony Johnson (wide receiver) =

American football player (born 1995)

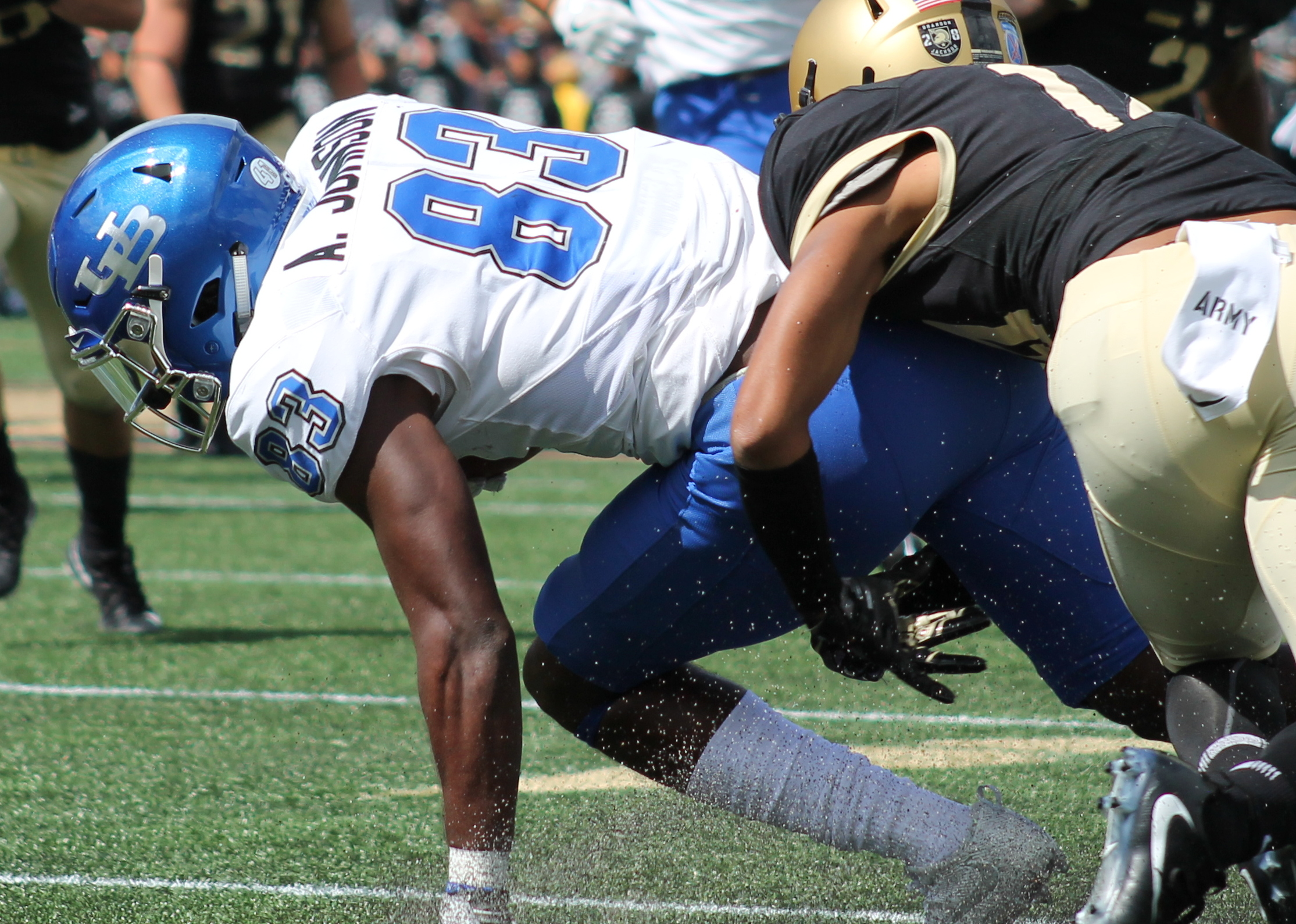
- Johnson with the Buffalo Bulls in 2017

No. 84
- Position: Wide receiver

Personal information
- Born: January 29, 1995 (age 31); Rock Hill, South Carolina, U.S.
- Listed height: 6 ft 2 in (1.88 m)
- Listed weight: 220 lb (100 kg)

Career information
- High school: South Pointe (SC)
- College: Buffalo
- NFL draft: 2019: undrafted

Career history
- Tampa Bay Buccaneers (2019)*; Los Angeles Chargers (2019)*; Pittsburgh Steelers (2020–2021)*; Hamilton Tiger-Cats (2022–2023)
- * Offseason or practice squad member only

Awards and highlights
- 2× First-team All-MAC (2017, 2018)

Career CFL statistics
- Receptions: 13
- Receiving yards: 250
- Receiving touchdowns: 1
- Stats at Pro Football Reference
- Stats at CFL.ca

Anthony Johnson (born January 29, 1995) is an American former professional football wide receiver. He played college football at Buffalo. He was a member of the Tampa Bay Buccaneers, Los Angeles Chargers, Pittsburgh Steelers, and Hamilton Tiger-Cats.

== Early life and college ==
Johnson attended South Pointe High School in Rock Hill, South Carolina. He attended Butler Community College in 2014 and Iowa Western Community College in 2015. He transferred to the University at Buffalo in 2016 and redshirted his first year. In 2017, he started all 12 games and had 76 receptions for 1,356 yards and a school record 14 touchdowns. In 2018, he started all 13 games and had 57 receptions for 1,011 yards and 11 touchdowns.

== Professional career ==
Pre-draft measurables
Height	Weight	Arm length	Hand span	Wingspan	40-yard dash	10-yard split	20-yard split	Three-cone drill	Vertical jump	Broad jump	Bench press
6 ft 1 7/8 in (1.88 m)	209 lb (95 kg)	31 3/8 in (0.80 m)	9 3/8 in (0.24 m)	6 ft 2 5/8 in (1.90 m)	4.55 s	1.58 s	2.62 s	7.12 s	32.5 in (0.83 m)	10 ft 2 in (3.10 m)	18 reps
All values from NFL Combine/Pro Day

=== Tampa Bay Buccaneers ===
Johnson signed with the Tampa Bay Buccaneers as an undrafted free agent following the 2019 NFL draft. He was one of five undrafted free agents from Buffalo to sign with teams after the draft, including quarterback Tyree Jackson. He was waived during final roster cuts on August 30, 2019.

=== Los Angeles Chargers ===
On September 11, 2019, Johnson was signed to the Los Angeles Chargers practice squad. His practice squad contract with the team expired on January 6, 2020.

=== Pittsburgh Steelers ===
On January 8, 2020, Johnson signed a reserve/future contract with the Pittsburgh Steelers. He was waived/injured on August 27, 2020, and subsequently reverted to the team's injured reserve list the next day. He was waived with an injury settlement on September 4, 2020. The Steelers signed Johnson to their practice squad on October 26, 2020. On January 14, 2021, Johnson signed a reserve/futures contract with the Steelers. He was waived on August 28, 2021.

=== Hamilton Tiger-Cats ===
On April 20, 2022 it was announced that Johnson had signed with the Hamilton Tiger-Cats of the Canadian Football League (CFL). He was released on October 14, 2023.
