= 2008 Bowling Green Falcons football team =

American college football season

2008 Bowling Green Falcons football
- Conference: Mid-American Conference
- East Division
- Record: 6–6 (4–4 MAC)
- Head coach: Gregg Brandon
- Offensive coordinator: Troy Rothenbuhler; Matt Campbell
- Offensive scheme: Spread
- Defensive coordinator: Mike Ward
- Home stadium: Doyt Perry Stadium (Capacity: 23,724)

2008 Mid-American Conference football standings
	Conf.			Overall
Team	W		L	W		L
East Division
Buffalo x$	5	–	3	8	–	6
Bowling Green	4	–	4	6	–	6
Temple	4	–	4	5	–	7
Ohio	3	–	5	4	–	8
Akron	3	–	5	5	–	7
Kent State	3	–	5	4	–	8
Miami (OH)	1	–	7	2	–	10
West Division
Ball State x	8	–	0	12	–	2
Central Michigan	6	–	2	8	–	5
Western Michigan	6	–	2	9	–	4
Northern Illinois	5	–	3	6	–	7
Toledo	2	–	6	3	–	9
Eastern Michigan	2	–	6	3	–	9
Championship: Buffalo 42, Ball State 24
$ – Conference champion; x – Division champion/co-champions

The 2008 Bowling Green Falcons football team represented Bowling Green State University during the 2008 NCAA Division I FBS football season. The team's head football coach was Gregg Brandon. The Falcons played their home games at Doyt Perry Stadium in Bowling Green, Ohio. They were a member of the East Division of the Mid-American Conference. They finished the season 6–6, 4–4 in MAC play to finish in a tie for second place in the East Division. Despite being bowl eligible, they were not selected to participate in a bowl game.

== Preseason ==
Shortly after the 2007 season, the Falcons lost backup quarterback, Anthony Glaud and wide receiver, Zach Charles to transfer as the pair made their way to defending MEAC champion Delaware State, because of lack of playing time. On May 12, the Football Writers Association of America announced that Bowling Green senior defensive lineman Diyral Briggs was placed on their watch list for the Bronko Nagurski Trophy, awarded to the nation's top defensive player. At the MAC football media day, the Falcons were voted as the preseason favorites to win the East Division crown, garnering 17 first place votes and 206 total votes, just edging out rival, Miami (OH) who had 7 first place votes and 202 total votes.

=== Recruiting ===
College recruiting information (2008)
Name	Hometown	School	Height	Weight	40^{‡}	Commit date
Andrew Beam; QB	Escalon, CA	Escalon HS	6 ft 4 in (1.93 m)	235 lb (107 kg)	4.7	Jan 27, 2008
Andrew Beam; QB	Recruit ratings: Scout: Rivals:					
Jonathan Davis; S	Ravenna, OH	Ravenna HS	5 ft 11 in (1.80 m)	170 lb (77 kg)	N/A	Feb 6, 2008
Jonathan Davis; S	Recruit ratings: Scout: Rivals:					
Winston Etheridge; DE	Cleveland, OH	Glenville Academy	6 ft 3 in (1.91 m)	245 lb (111 kg)	N/A	Feb 6, 2008
Winston Etheridge; DE	Recruit ratings: Scout: Rivals:					
Tim German; OG	Newark, OH	Licking Valley HS	6 ft 3 in (1.91 m)	285 lb (129 kg)	N/A	Oct 23, 2007
Tim German; OG	Recruit ratings: Scout: Rivals:					
DeMark Jenkins; WR	Gary, IN	West Side HS	6 ft 2 in (1.88 m)	190 lb (86 kg)	4.52	Dec 20, 2007
DeMark Jenkins; WR	Recruit ratings: Scout: Rivals:					
Robert Lorenzi; CB	Concord, CA	Clayton Valley HS	5 ft 9 in (1.75 m)	170 lb (77 kg)	N/A	Feb 6, 2008
Robert Lorenzi; CB	Recruit ratings: Scout: Rivals:					
Casey McHugh; OT	San Francisco, CA	Archbishop Riordan HS	6 ft 6 in (1.98 m)	275 lb (125 kg)	N/A	Feb 6, 2008
Casey McHugh; OT	Recruit ratings: Scout: Rivals:					
Keith Morgan; QB	Bellefontaine, OH	Bellefontaine HS	6 ft 1 in (1.85 m)	195 lb (88 kg)	N/A	Jun 28, 2007
Keith Morgan; QB	Recruit ratings: Scout: Rivals:					
Aaron Pankratz; QB	Macedonia, OH	Nordonia HS	6 ft 5 in (1.96 m)	220 lb (100 kg)	N/A	Feb 6, 2008
Aaron Pankratz; QB	Recruit ratings: Scout: Rivals:					
Jerry Phillips; K	Clyde, OH	Clyde HS	6 ft 1 in (1.85 m)	195 lb (88 kg)	N/A	Feb 6, 2008
Jerry Phillips; K	Recruit ratings: Scout: Rivals:					
Marquese Quiles; CB	Suwanee, GA	North Gwinnett HS	6 ft 0 in (1.83 m)	170 lb (77 kg)	4.62	Feb 6, 2008
Marquese Quiles; CB	Recruit ratings: Scout: Rivals:					
Lane Robilotto; CB	Painesville, OH	Riverside HS	6 ft 1 in (1.85 m)	180 lb (82 kg)	4.55	Jul 15, 2007
Lane Robilotto; CB	Recruit ratings: Scout: Rivals:					
Chip Robinson; OG	Middletown, OH	Middletown HS	6 ft 7 in (2.01 m)	340 lb (150 kg)	5.64	Oct 2, 2007
Chip Robinson; OG	Recruit ratings: Scout: Rivals:					
Marc Stevens; OG	Lexington, OH	Lexington HS	6 ft 6 in (1.98 m)	289 lb (131 kg)	5.34	Oct 7, 2007
Marc Stevens; OG	Recruit ratings: Scout: Rivals:					
Anthony Stover; MLB	Canal Fulton, OH	Northwest HS	6 ft 2 in (1.88 m)	200 lb (91 kg)	N/A	Feb 6, 2008
Anthony Stover; MLB	Recruit ratings: Scout: Rivals:					
Nicholas Tuminello; DE	Youngstown, OH	Boardman HS	6 ft 4 in (1.93 m)	225 lb (102 kg)	N/A	Feb 6, 2008
Nicholas Tuminello; DE	Recruit ratings: Scout: Rivals:					
Blaec Walker; OG	Middletown, OH	Middletown HS	6 ft 5 in (1.96 m)	321 lb (146 kg)	5.51	Oct 2, 2007
Blaec Walker; OG	Recruit ratings: Scout: Rivals:					
Norman Young; CB	Trotwood, OH	Trotwood-Madison HS	6 ft 1 in (1.85 m)	185 lb (84 kg)	4.41	Oct 9, 2007
Norman Young; CB	Recruit ratings: Scout: Rivals:					
Overall recruit ranking:
‡ Refers to 40-yard dash; Note: In many cases, Scout, Rivals, 247Sports, On3, and ESPN may conflict in their listings of height, weight and 40 time.; In these cases, the average was taken. ESPN grades are on a 100-point scale.; Sources: "Bowling Green Commit List for 2007". Rivals.; "Bowling Green: Commits". Scout.; "Scout.com Team Recruiting Rankings". Scout.; "2008 Team Ranking". Rivals.com.

== Schedule ==
Date	Time	Opponent	Site	TV	Result	Attendance
August 30	12:00 pm	at No. 25 Pittsburgh*	Heinz Field; Pittsburgh, PA	ESPNU	W 27–17	45,063
September 6	7:30 pm	Minnesota*	Doyt Perry Stadium; Bowling Green, OH	ESPNU	L 17–42	23,184
September 13	8:00 pm	at Boise State*	Bronco Stadium; Boise, ID	KTVB	L 7–20	32,335
September 27	4:00 pm	at Wyoming*	War Memorial Stadium; Laramie, WY	the mtn.	W 45–16	17,411
October 4	4:00 pm	Eastern Michigan^{†}	Doyt Perry Stadium; Bowling Green, OH	BCSN	L 21–24	16,217
October 11	6:00 pm	at Akron	Rubber Bowl; Akron, OH		W 37–33	17,119
October 18	12:00 pm	Miami (OH)	Doyt Perry Stadium; Bowling Green, OH	ESPN+	L 20–27	15,411
October 25	4:00 pm	at Northern Illinois	Huskie Stadium; DeKalb, IL		L 13–16	17,163
November 1	2:00 pm	Kent State	Doyt Perry Stadium; Bowling Green, OH (Battle for the Anniversary Award)		W 45–30	10,411
November 8	2:00 pm	at Ohio	Peden Stadium; Athens, OH		W 28–3	15,018
November 21	6:00 pm	Buffalo	Doyt Perry Stadium; Bowling Green, OH		L 34–40 ^{2OT}	13,284
November 28	3:30 pm	at Toledo	Glass Bowl; Toledo, OH (Peace Pipe Trophy)	ESPN Classic	W 38–10	11,264
*Non-conference game; ^{†}Homecoming; Rankings from AP Poll released prior to the game; All times are in Eastern time

== Roster ==
(as of 18 March 2008)
Wide Receivers: 7 Barnes, Freddie - Junior; 84 Brighton, Derek - Sophomore; 80 Cheathem, Keston - Sophomore; 9 Hodges, Adrian - (redshirt) Freshman; 85 Hutson, Ray - (redshirt) Freshman; 86 Kelley, Jermiah - Senior; 3 Parks, Marques - Senior; 1 Partridge, Corey - Senior; 83 Pronty, Tyrone - Junior; 15 Wiley, Calvin - Junior; 12 Wright, Chris - Junior; Offensive Lineman: 64 Albert, Scott - Junior; 61 Bojicic, Ben- (redshirt) Freshman; 55 Curtis, Brandon - Senior; 66 Dodge, Josh - (redshirt) Freshman; 46 Donahue, Tyler - Sophomore; 74 Fink, Jeff - Senior; 76 Kent, Aaron - Senior; 60 McHugh, Casey - Junior; 70 Minturn, Brady - Junior; 97 Smith, Darius - Sophomore; 75 Steffy, Shane - Junior; 87 Young, D.J. - Junior; Tight End: 91 Rieke, Nick - Sophomore; 89 Scheidler, Jimmy - Junior; Quarterback: 14 Brown, Nathan - (redshirt) Freshman; 16 Hunter, Tony - Junior; 13 Sheehan, Tyler - Junior; 17 Turner, Anthony - Senior	Running Back: 33 Bullock, Chris - Junior; 28 Geter, Willie - Sophomore; 19 Ransom, Eric - Senior; 17 Turner, Anthony - Senior; 32 Woolridge, Mark - (redshirt) Freshman; Defensive Lineman: 92 Alvarado, Kevin - (redshirt) Freshman; 63 Barrow, Orlando - Sophomore; 96 Branch, Darren - (redshirt) Freshman; 99 Briggs, Diyral - Senior; 62 Burrell, Preston - (redshirt) Freshman; 95 Davis, Nick - Senior; 93 Hardwick, Jacob - Junior; 93 Hartung, Garth - Senior; 98 Johnson, Andrew - (redshirt) Freshman; 90 Ream, Michael - Junior; 40 Schaefer, Joe - Senior; 77 Torresso, Nick - Sophomore; Defensive End: 51 Magnone, Angelo - Sophomore; 94 Tipton, Carlos - Sophomore; Cornerbacks: 18 Williams, Derrick - (redshirt) Freshman; 28 Wooldridge, Mark - Sophomore; Defensive Backs: 24 Brown, Jahmal - Junior; 27 Fillari, Giovanni - Senior; 21 Lewis, Kenny - Senior; 23 Lewis, Tarell - Junior; 34 Lorenzi, Robert - Junior; 25 Mahone, P.J. - Junior; 10 Marshall, Calvin - Sophomore; 2 Smith, Antonio - Senior; 20 Tomlinson, Alfred - Sophomore; 5 Walker, Freddie - Senior; 31 Williams, Roger - Junior	Linebackers: 47 Baker, Adrian - Senior; 45 Basler, Cody - Junior; 37 Davis, Aaron - Junior; 53 Davis, Jerrson - Junior; 30 Dozier, Erique - Senior; 56 Tyler, Jason - Sophomore; 42 Fells, Eugene - Sophomore; 44 Haneline, John - Senior; 43 Jackson, Brandon - Junior; 36 Parks, Lewis - Sophomore; 4 Sanderson, Jerett - Junior; 22 Scheidler, Josh - Junior; 35 Waldron, Nate - Senior; Long Snappers: 57 Dahlman, Neal - Sophomore; 46 Rutherford, Craig - Junior; Kickers: 39 Norsic, Matthew - Junior; 41 Vrvilo, Sinisia - Senior; Punters: 26 Iovinelli, Nick - Senior; 39 Norsic, Matthew - Junior

== Coaching staff ==
The Bowling Green Falcons have seen numerous changes in the coaching staff. Offensive Coordinator Mick McCall left the team to take the same position at Northwestern, while former Buffalo head coach, Jim Hofher, was named quarterbacks coach, Troy Rothenbuhler was named passing game coordinator, Matt Campbell was named running game coordinator, and Doug Phillips was named recruiting coordinator.

Name	Position	Years at BGSU
Gregg Brandon	Head coach	6
Troy Rothenbuhler	Assistant head coach Wide receivers Passing game coordinator	6
Mike Ward	Defensive coordinator	17
Stephen Bird	Wide receivers	2
Matt Campbell	Offensive line Running game coordinator	2
Jim Hofher	Quarterbacks	1
Adam Gonzaga	Defensive backs	2
Deion Melvin	Linebackers	2
John Hunter	Running backs	3
Doug Phillips	Defensive ends	2
Stan Watson	Defensive assistant	1
Adam Salon	Offensive assistant	2
Aaron Hillmann	Strength and conditioning	8

== Game summaries ==
=== Pittsburgh ===
	1	2	3	4	Total
Bowling Green	0	14	6	7	27
Pittsburgh	7	10	0	0	17

The Falcons opened the 2008 campaign against nationally ranked Pitt at Heinz Field in Pittsburgh, Pennsylvania in front of 45,063 and a national television audience on ESPNU. The Falcons came in as 13-point underdogs against the Panthers, who had previously been 25-2 against the MAC and 24-0 at home against the conference. Pittsburgh showed their poise early on in the game scoring on their first offensive drive of the game with an 11-yard run by running back LeSean McCoy to cap off an eight play, 71-yard drive that took less than four minutes to complete. Pitt would extend their lead in the early in the second quarter with 4 yard touchdown pass to Derek Kinder from quarterback Bill Stull, making the score 14–0 in favor of Pitt. The Falcons would answer back against the Panthers on the following possession, marching down the field 73 yards in eight plays, capped off with a five-yard pass to Jimmy Scheidler from wide receiver Freddie Barnes, cutting Pitt's lead to 14–7. Scheidler would bring in his second touchdown reception of the game six and a half minutes later on a three-yard touchdown pass from quarterback Tyler Sheehan, which tied the game at 14–14. Pitt would answer back on the following possession as their Lou Groza Award candidate kicker Connor Lee booted 36 yard field goal as time expired in the first half, giving Pitt the halftime lead 17–14.

The game would become a story of two halves as the Falcons came out and as the Falcons defense slowed down the powerhouse McCoy and forced Pitt to two fumbles and an interception. Bowling Green would take their first lead of the game with an 8-yard run by wide receiver Anthony Turner with 3:53 left in the third quarter. The preceding extra point was blocked by Pitt and the Falcons took the lead of 20–14. Early in the fourth quarter the Bowling Green defense caused Pitt's third fumble and seemed to return it to the end zone for an apparent game-winning touchdown, but due to an inadvertent whistle, Bowling Green was stripped of the touchdown, but still took over possession of the ball at Pitt's 11-yard line. The Falcons would make good on their field position scoring on an 11-yard run on a quarterback draw by Sheehan which increased the Falcons' lead to 27–17. Pitt continued to attempt to mount a comeback but after Lee's missed field goal of 42 yards at 3:58 left in the fourth quarter blew the wind out of Pitt's sails and Stull being intercepted in the end zone by Kenny Lewis with 1:26 left in the game officially put Pitt away. The Falcons improved to 1–0 on the season and had their second consecutive season opening victory over a BCS Conference opponent (having defeated Minnesota 32–31 in overtime the year before), although being outgained by the Pitt offense 393–254. Sheehan lead the Falcons in the passing game completing 24 of 40 attempts for 163 yards, 1 touchdown, and an interception, followed by Barnes who was 2 of 2 for 27 yards and a touchdown. The Falcons' running game was led by Chris Bullock who had 7 rushes for 44 yards, followed by Turner and Sheehan who each had a rushing touchdown. Bullock also led the receivers with 7 receptions for 49 yards along with Scheidler who had 3 receptions for 30 yards and two touchdowns. Jamal Brown led the Falcons defense with 14 tackles, followed by Antonio Smith's 12. Smith, Lewis, and Enrique Dozier each forced fumbles, with Lewis, Dozier, and Angelo Magnone each recovering a fumble and Lewis snagging the lone interception for the Falcons defense. The Falcons were able to sack Stull four times, twice by Bronko Nagurski Trophy candidate Diyral Briggs and once each by Smith and Dozier.

=== Minnesota ===
	1	2	3	4	Total
Minnesota	7	7	7	21	42
Bowling Green	0	10	7	0	17

=== Boise State ===
	1	2	3	4	Total
Bowling Green	0	0	0	7	7
Boise State	6	14	0	0	20

=== Wyoming ===
	1	2	3	4	Total
Bowling Green	7	17	14	7	45
Wyoming	0	10	0	6	16

=== Eastern Michigan ===
	1	2	3	4	Total
Eastern Michigan	0	7	10	7	24
Bowling Green	7	0	7	7	21

=== Akron ===
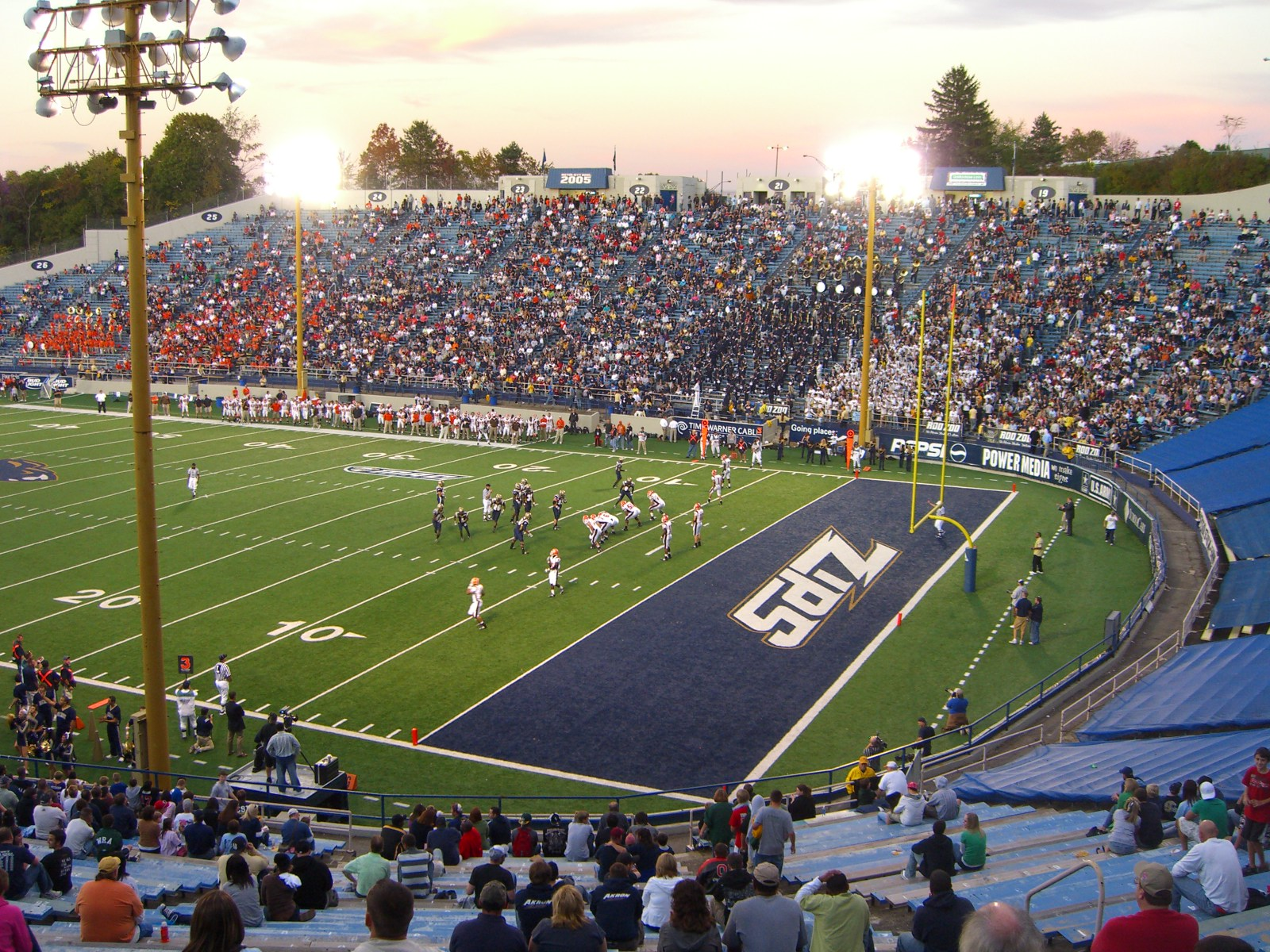
The Akron Zips and Bowling Green Falcons compete at the Rubber Bowl in Akron, Ohio on October 11, 2008.

	1	2	3	4	Total
Bowling Green	0	14	0	23	37
Akron	7	14	6	6	33

=== Miami (OH) ===
	1	2	3	4	Total
Miami (OH)	7	7	3	10	27
Bowling Green	3	7	10	0	20

=== Northern Illinois ===
	1	2	3	4	Total
Bowling Green	3	3	7	0	13
Northern Illinois	3	0	7	6	16

=== Kent State ===
	1	2	3	4	Total
Kent State	0	0	15	15	30
Bowling Green	7	21	3	14	45

=== Ohio ===
	1	2	3	4	Total
Bowling Green	7	7	14	0	28
Ohio	0	0	3	0	3

=== Buffalo ===
	1	2	3	4	OT	2OT	Total
Buffalo	0	0	7	20	7	6	40
Bowling Green	0	14	7	6	7	0	34

=== Toledo ===
	1	2	3	4	Total
Bowling Green	14	3	14	7	38
Toledo	0	0	3	7	10

== Statistics ==
=== Team ===
	Team	Opp
Scoring	51	79
Points per game	17.0	26.3
First downs	59	65
Rushing	24	29
Passing	31	33
Penalty	4	3
Total offense	950	1130
Avg per play	4.5	5.3
Avg per game	316.7	376.7
Fumbles-Lost	9-6	6-4
Penalties-Yards	14-109	12-103

	Team	Opp
Punts-Yards	15-653	16-634
Avg per punt	43.5	39.6
Time of possession/Game	28:53	31:07
3rd down conversions	18/48	18/41
4th down conversions	5/5	4/6
Touchdowns scored	7	11
Field goals-Attempts-Long	1-4-26	1-2-36
PAT-Attempts	6-7	10-10
Attendance	23,184	77,398
Games/Avg per Game	1/23,184	2/38,699

==== Scores by quarter ====
	1	2	3	4	Total
Opponents	20	31	7	21	79
Bowling Green	0	24	13	14	51

=== Offense ===
==== Rushing ====
Name	GP	Att	Gain	Loss	Net	Avg	TD	Long	Avg/G
Bullock, Chris	1	7	45	1	44	6.3	0	36	44.0
Turner, Anthony	1	8	21	5	16	2.0	1	8	16.0
Barnes, Freddie	1	5	16	2	14	2.8	0	11	14.0
Sheehan, Tyler	1	6	16	20	-4	-0.7	1	11	-4.0
TEAM	1	2	0	6	-6	-3.0	-3.0	0	-6.0
Total	1	28	98	34	64	2.3	2	36	64.0
Opponents	1	35	157	28	129	3.7	1	27	129.0

==== Passing ====
Name	GP	Effic	Att-Cmp-Int	Pct	Yds	TD	Lng	Avg/G
Sheehan, Tyler	1	97.5	24-40-1	60.0	163	1	22	163.0
Barnes, Freddie	1	378.4	2-2-0	100.0	27	1	22	27.0
Total	1	110.9	26-41-1	61.9	190	2	22	190.0
Opponents	1	102.9	29-51-1	56.9	264	1	18	264.0

==== Receiving ====
Name	GP	No.	Yds	Avg	TD	Long	Avg/G
Bullock, Chris	1	7	49	7.0	0	22	49.0
Partridge, Corey	1	3	34	11.3	0	18	34.0
Scheidler, Jimmy	1	3	30	10.0	2	22	30.0
Pronty, Tyrone	1	3	24	8.0	0	9	24.0
Barnes, Freddie	1	3	21	7.0	0	11	21.0
Parks, Marques	1	2	13	6.5	0	7	13.0
Turner, Anthony	1	2	7	3.5	0	4	7.0
Hutson, Ray	1	2	5	2.5	0	4	5.0
Wright, Chris	1	1	7	7.0	0	7	7.0
Total	1	26	190	7.3	2	22	190.0
Opponents	1	29	264	9.1	1	18	264.0

=== Defense ===
Name	GP	Tackles				Sacks	Pass defense		Interceptions				Fumbles		Blkd Kick
Name	GP	Solo	Ast	Total	TFL-Yds	No-Yds	BrUp	QBH	No.-Yds	Avg	TD	Long	Rcv-Yds	FF	Blkd Kick
Brown, Jahmal	1	11	3	14	0-0	0-0	1	0	0-0	0.0	0	0	0-0	0	0
Smith, Antonio	1	9	3	12	2-13	1-8	2	0	0-0	0.0	0	0	0-0	1	0
Haneline, John	1	5	2	7	0-0	0-0	0	0	0-0	0.0	0	0	0-0	0	0
Mahone, P.J.	1	4	3	7	0-0	0-0	1	0	0-0	0.0	0	0	0-0	0	0
Lewis, Kenny	1	5	1	6	0-0	0-0	1	0	1-0	0.0	0	0	1-0	1	0
Dozier, Erique	1	4	2	6	0-0	1-0	2	1	0-0	0.0	0	0	1-0	1	0
Briggs, Diyral	1	4	2	6	2-9	2-9	0	3	0-0	0.0	0	0	0-0	0	0
Sanderson, Jerett	1	4	0	4	0-0	0-0	0	0	0-0	0.0	0	0	0-0	0	0
Ream, Michael	1	2	2	4	1-3	0-0	0	3	0-0	0.0	0	0	0-0	0	0
Johnson, Andrew	1	0	2	2	0-0	0-0	0	0	0-0	0.0	0	0	0-0	0	0
Williams, Roger	1	2	0	2	1-2	0-0	0	0	0-0	0.0	0	0	0-0	0	0
Fells, Eugene	1	0	1	1	0-0	0-0	0	0	0-0	0.0	0	0	0-0	0	0
Magnone, Angelo	1	0	1	1	0-0	0-0	0	1	0-0	0.0	0	0	1-6	0	0
Parks, Lewis	1	1	0	1	0-0	0-0	0	0	0-0	0.0	0	0	0-0	0	0
Baker, Adrian	1	1	0	1	0-0	0-0	0	0	0-0	0.0	0	0	0-0	0	0
Alvarado, Kevin	1	0	1	1	0-0	0-0	0	0	0-0	0.0	0	0	0-0	0	0
Basler, Cody	1	1	0	1	0-0	0-0	0	0	0-0	0.0	0	0	0-0	0	0
Rice, Jason	1	0	1	1	0-0	0-0	0	0	0-0	0.0	0	0	0-0	0	0
Total	1	53	24	77	6-26	4-17	7	9	1-0	0.0	0	0	3-6	3	0

=== Special teams ===
Name	Punting								Kickoffs				
Name	No.	Yds	Avg	Long	TB	FC	I20	Blkd	No.	Yds	Avg	TB	OB
Iovinelli, Nick	8	361	45.1	79	1	1	2	0	0	0	0.0	0	0
Vrvilo, Sinisa	0	0	0	0	0	0	0	0	5	300	60.0	0	0
Total	8	361	45.1	79	1	1	0	2	5	300	60.0	0	0

Name	Punt returns					Kick returns				
Name	No.	Yds	Avg	TD	Long	No.	Yds	Avg	TD	Long
Partridge, Corey	2	2	1.0	0	8	0	0	0	0	0
Williams, Roger	0	0	0.0	0	0	2	42	21.0	0	21
Barnes, Freddie	0	0	0.0	0	0	1	16	16.0	0	16
Total	2	2	1.0	0	8	3	58	19.3	0	21
