= Drew Anderson (American football) =

American gridiron football player (born 1995)

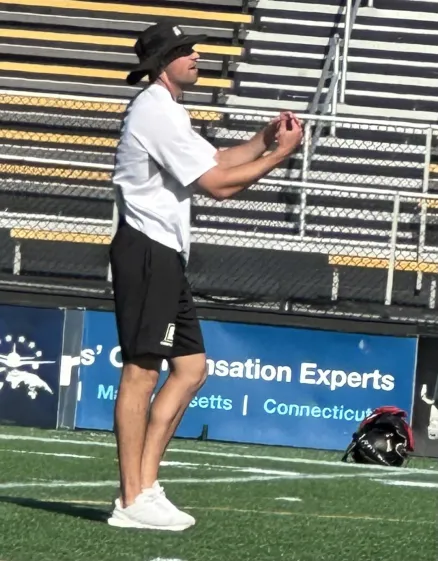
- Anderson with Bryant in 2024

Colorado State Rams
- Title: Assistant wide receivers coach

Personal information
- Born: October 18, 1995 (age 31); Orinda, California, U.S.
- Listed height: 6 ft 4 in (1.93 m)
- Listed weight: 221 lb (100 kg)

Career information
- High school: Miramonte HS
- College: Diablo Valley (2014–2015); Buffalo (2016–2017); Murray State (2018)
- NFL draft: 2019: undrafted

Career history

Playing
- Arizona Cardinals (2019); TSL Jousters (2021); Edmonton Elks (2021)*
- * Offseason or practice squad member only

Coaching
- Diablo Valley (2021–2022) Offensive coordinator; Bryant (2023–2025) Quarterbacks coach; Colorado State (2026–present) Assistant wide receivers coach
- Stats at Pro Football Reference

Drew Anderson (born October 18, 1995) is an American college football coach and former quarterback. He is the assistant wide receivers coach for Colorado State University, a position he has held since 2026. He played college football at Murray State.

== College career ==
Anderson enrolled in Diablo Valley College, where he threw for 3,459 yards and 33 touchdowns during the 2015 season for the Vikings. In 2016, Anderson transferred to the University at Buffalo where he saw action in one game vs. Bowling Green State University. In 2017, Anderson would relieve Buffalo's starting Quarterback Tyree Jackson vs. Florida Atlantic Owls where he would complete seven of nine passes for 109 yards and one touchdown. Anderson would win his first start for the Bulls the following week vs. the Kent State Golden Flashes. On October 7, 2017, Anderson would throw for a school record 597 yards and seven touchdowns while completing 35-of-61 attempts vs. Western Michigan University in a 68-71 seven overtime loss. Anderson ended the season with completing 66 of his 107 attempts for a 62.3 completion percentage while throwing for 1,039 yards and 10 touchdowns to just one interception. He'd also had 11 carries for 92 yards and one rushing touchdown. In 2018, Anderson would complete his collegiate career at Murray State University. For the Racers, Anderson threw for 20 touchdowns to 15 interceptions while throwing for 2,864 yards. Anderson completed 258 of 429 attempts while rushing for 225 yards on 54 attempts while adding five touchdowns on the ground.

== Professional career ==
=== Arizona Cardinals ===
After going undrafted in the 2019 NFL draft Anderson was signed by the Arizona Cardinals of the National Football League (NFL).

In week one of the 2019 NFL Preseason, Anderson would make his professional debut vs. the Los Angeles Chargers. In week two, Anderson would go on to throw his first professional touchdown pass vs. the Oakland Raiders. Over three solid preseason appearances, Anderson completed 18 of 32 attempts for 206 yards, including two touchdowns to one interception. Anderson also had three carries for 42 yards. After the preseason concluded, Anderson was released when the Cardinals signed Kyle Sloter to the practice squad. Once Sloter signed with the Detroit Lions in November, Anderson was brought back.

In week 17 of the 2019 NFL season, Anderson was promoted to the active roster but did not see any action. He was waived on July 26, 2020.

Anderson saw action as a quarterback for the Jousters of The Spring League in 2021.

=== Edmonton Elks ===
Anderson signed with the Edmonton Elks of the CFL on June 29, 2021. Anderson was released by the Elks on July 30, 2021.

== Coaching career ==
From 2021 to 2022 Anderson served as the offensive coordinator for Diablo Valley College.

In 2023, Anderson was hired as the quarterbacks coach for Bryant University under head coach Chris Merritt.
