= 2008 Kent State Golden Flashes football team =

American college football season

2008 Kent State Golden Flashes football
- Conference: Mid-American Conference
- East
- Record: 4–8 (3–5 MAC)
- Head coach: Doug Martin (5th season)
- Offensive coordinator: A. J. Pratt (1st season)
- Offensive scheme: Air raid
- Defensive coordinator: Pete Rekstis (5th season)
- Base defense: 4–3
- Home stadium: Dix Stadium

2008 Mid-American Conference football standings
	Conf.			Overall
Team	W		L	W		L
East Division
Buffalo x$	5	–	3	8	–	6
Bowling Green	4	–	4	6	–	6
Temple	4	–	4	5	–	7
Ohio	3	–	5	4	–	8
Akron	3	–	5	5	–	7
Kent State	3	–	5	4	–	8
Miami (OH)	1	–	7	2	–	10
West Division
Ball State x	8	–	0	12	–	2
Central Michigan	6	–	2	8	–	5
Western Michigan	6	–	2	9	–	4
Northern Illinois	5	–	3	6	–	7
Toledo	2	–	6	3	–	9
Eastern Michigan	2	–	6	3	–	9
Championship: Buffalo 42, Ball State 24
$ – Conference champion; x – Division champion/co-champions

The 2008 Kent State Golden Flashes football team represented the Kent State University during the 2008 NCAA Division I FBS football season. Kent State competed as a member of the Mid-American Conference (MAC), and played their home games at Dix Stadium. The Golden Flashes were led by fifth-year head coach Doug Martin. Kent State finished the season with a 4–8 record (MAC: 3–5).

Kent State lost to Boston College of the Atlantic Coast Conference in the season-opener, the second-annual FirstMerit Patriot Bowl, 21–0. Against Iowa State of the Big 12, the Golden Flashes suffered two blocked punts and surrendered four fumbles in a 48–28 loss. They beat Division I FCS opponent, Delaware State, handily, 24–3. Without their featured running back, Eugene Jarvis, they also lost to Louisiana–Lafayette, undefeated Ball State, and Akron. Against the latter, Kent State led 21–10 at half time, but missed a 27-yard field goal in the fourth quarter and surrendered a touchdown, which forced overtime. In second overtime, the Flashes lost by missing a 23-yard field goal. In the season finale, they upset eventual MAC champions, Buffalo, 24–21.

== Schedule ==
Date	Time	Opponent	Site	TV	Result	Attendance
August 30	7:30 pm	vs. Boston College*	Cleveland Browns Stadium; Cleveland, OH (FirstMerit Patriot Bowl)	ESPNU	L 21–0	10,788
September 6	6:00 pm	at Iowa State*	Jack Trice Stadium; Ames, IA		L 48–28	49,805
September 13	2:00 pm	Delaware State (FCS)*	Dix Stadium; Kent, OH		W 24–3	8,529
September 20	6:00 pm	at Louisiana–Lafayette	Cajun Field; Lafayette, LA		L 44–27	18,241
September 27	12:00 pm	at Ball State	Scheumann Stadium; Muncie, IN	ESPN+	L 41–20	20,437
October 4	12:00 pm	Akron	Dix Stadium; Kent, OH (Battle for the Wagon Wheel)	ESPN+	L 30–27 ^{2OT}	18,536
October 11	2:30 pm	Ohio^{†}	Dix Stadium; Kent, OH	FSN	L 26–19	16,825
October 25	3:30 pm	at Miami (OH)	Yager Stadium; Oxford, OH	ONN	W 54–21	14,460
November 1	2:00 pm	at Bowling Green	Doyt Perry Stadium; Bowling Green, OH (Battle for the Anniversary Award)		L 45–30	10,411
November 12	8:00 pm	Temple	Dix Stadium; Kent, OH	ESPN360	W 41–38	6,886
November 18	7:00 pm	Northern Illinois	Dix Stadium; Kent, OH		L 42–14	2,267
November 28	2:00 pm	at Buffalo	University at Buffalo Stadium; Buffalo, NY	FSN	W 24–21	13,754
*Non-conference game; ^{†}Homecoming; All times are in Eastern time
