= Patriot Bowl =

FirstMerit Patriot Bowl (defunct)
- Stadium: Cleveland Browns Stadium
- Location: Cleveland, Ohio
- Operated: 2007–2009
- Conference tie-ins: Mid-American Conference
- Previous conference tie-ins: Federal service academies

Sponsors
- FirstMerit Corporation

2009 matchup
- Ohio State vs. Toledo (38-0)

2010 matchup

The FirstMerit Patriot Bowl was an annual regular season college football game played on Labor Day weekend in Cleveland, Ohio at Browns Stadium. It was originally envisioned as an annual match-up between a Mid-American Conference (MAC) and a Federal service academy team, but only the first game featured the latter. The event was sponsored by the FirstMerit Corporation, an Akron, Ohio-based financial institution, and organized by the Greater Cleveland Sports Commission. The Patriot Bowl featured a pre-game flag football match between the Cleveland police and Cleveland fire departments. The winner of the Patriot Bowl is awarded the Cleary Trophy, named in honor of Michael Cleary, an executive director of the National Association of Collegiate Directors of Athletics and patron of the Greater Cleveland Sports Commission. A portion of the revenue was contributed to a charity for local-area military families.

The inaugural game was played on September 1, 2007 between the Army Black Knights and the Akron Zips. Akron, the MAC representative, won that game, 22–14. The second Patriot Bowl was held on August 30, 2008 and featured the Boston College Eagles of the Atlantic Coast Conference and the Kent State Golden Flashes of the MAC. Boston College won that edition handily and shutout Kent State, 21–0. The 2009 game featured the Ohio State Buckeyes of the Big Ten Conference and the Toledo Rockets of the MAC on September 19.

== Game results ==
Season	Date	Winning team		Losing team		Attendance
2007	September 1	Akron	22	Army	14	17,865
2008	August 30	Boston College	21	Kent State	0	10,788
2009	September 19	11 Ohio State	38	Toledo	0	71,727
