= 2008 MAC Championship Game =

2008 Marathon MAC Championship Game
- Conference Championship
Ball State Cardinals	Buffalo Bulls
(12–0)	(7–5)
24	42
Head coach: Brady Hoke	Head coach: Turner Gill
AP / Coaches / BCS; 12 / 13 / 12
	1	2	3	4	Total
Ball State	0	10	7	7	24
Buffalo	7	0	21	14	42
- Date: December 5, 2008
- Season: 2008
- Stadium: Ford Field
- Location: Detroit, Michigan
- MVP: Mike Newton (DB, Buffalo)
- Favorite: Ball State by 15
- Referee: Tom McCabe
- Attendance: 12,871

United States TV coverage
- Network: ESPN2
- Announcers: Sean McDonough, Chris Spielman, Rob Stone

2008 Mid-American Conference football standings
	Conf.			Overall
Team	W		L	W		L
East Division
Buffalo x$	5	–	3	8	–	6
Bowling Green	4	–	4	6	–	6
Temple	4	–	4	5	–	7
Ohio	3	–	5	4	–	8
Akron	3	–	5	5	–	7
Kent State	3	–	5	4	–	8
Miami (OH)	1	–	7	2	–	10
West Division
Ball State x	8	–	0	12	–	2
Central Michigan	6	–	2	8	–	5
Western Michigan	6	–	2	9	–	4
Northern Illinois	5	–	3	6	–	7
Toledo	2	–	6	3	–	9
Eastern Michigan	2	–	6	3	–	9
Championship: Buffalo 42, Ball State 24
$ – Conference champion; x – Division champion/co-champions

The 2008 MAC Championship Game was played on December 5, 2008 at Ford Field in Detroit, Michigan. The game featured the winner of each division of the Mid-American Conference. The game featured the Ball State Cardinals, of the West Division, and the Buffalo Bulls, of the East Division. The Buffalo Bulls upset the #12-ranked Ball State 42–24, ending hopes of an undefeated Cardinals season.

This was not the first time these two conference rivals have met. They met 5 times previously before this big Championship Game, with Ball State leading the series 5-0. Against the odds Buffalo faced the undefeated Cardinals and came out victorious in this matchup.

== Selection process ==
The MAC Championship Game matches up the winner of the East and West divisions of the Mid-American Conference.

Despite Ball State being undefeated, the Buffalo Bulls having 24 upperclassmen made the game competitive in the eyes of odds makers.

== Scoring summary ==
Quarter	Time	Drive		Team	Scoring information	Score	
Quarter	Time	Length	Time	Team	Scoring information	Ball State	Buffalo
1	1:59	3 plays, 25 yards	1:11	Buffalo	Naaman Roosevelt 2 yard pass from Drew Willy, A. J. Principe kick good	0	7
2	7:40	9 plays, 80 yards	4:01	Ball State	MiQuale Lewis 4 yard run, Ian McGarvey kick good	7	7
2	0:00	6 plays, 18 yards	1:00	Ball State	Ian McGarvey 47 yard field goal	10	7
3	11:24	7 plays, 80 yards	3:36	Buffalo	Naaman Roosevelt 39 yard pass from Drew Willy, A. J. Principe kick good	10	14
3	8:07	7 plays, 65 yards	3:10	Ball State	MiQuale Lewis 1 yard run	17	14
3	3:52			Buffalo	Mike Newton 92 yard fumble recovery, A. J. Principe kick good	17	21
3	0:19			Buffalo	Sherrod Lott 74 yard fumble recovery, A. J. Principe kick good	17	28
4	6:06	6 plays, 29 yards	2:48	Buffalo	Naaman Roosevelt 8 yard pass from Drew Willy, A. J. Principe kick good	17	35
4	4:17	8 plays, 66 yards	1:41	Ball State	Louis Johnson 22 yard pass from Nate Davis, Ian McGarvey kick good	24	35
4	2:53	4 plays, 25 yards	1:22	Buffalo	James Starks 1 yard run, A. J. Principe kick good	24	42
Final score						24	42

== Starting lineups ==
Ball State	Position	Buffalo
Offense
Louis Johnson	WR	Naaman Roosevelt
Andre Ramsey	LT	Ray Norell
Michael Switzer	LG	Peter Bittner
Dan Gerberry	C	Chris Lauzze
Kyle Cornwell	RG	Jeff Niedermier
Robert Brewster	RT	Andrew West
Darius Hill	TE	Jesse Rack
Madaris Grant	TE	Kyle Brey
Nate Davis	QB	Drew Willy
MiQuale Lewis	RB	James Starks
Briggs Orsbon	WR–FB	Lawrence Rolle
Defense
Brandon Crawford	LE	Andrae Smith
Rene Perry	LDT	Matt Brennan
Drew Duffin	RDT	Anel Montanez
Robert Eddins	RE	Mike Thompson
Kenny Meeks	SLB	Raphael Akobundu
Davyd Jones	MLB	Adekun Akingba
Bryant Haines	WLB	Justin Winters
B.J. Hill	LCB	Domonic Cook
Trey Buice	RCB	Kendrick Hawkins
Alex Knipp	SS	Davonte Shannon
Sean Baker	FS	Mike Newton
