= 2008 Buffalo Bulls football team =

American college football season

2008 Buffalo Bulls football

MAC champion MAC East Division champion

MAC Championship Game, W 42–24 vs. Ball State

International Bowl, L 20–38 v. Connecticut
- Conference: Mid-American Conference
- East Division
- Record: 8–6 (5–3 MAC)
- Head coach: Turner Gill (3rd season)
- Offensive coordinator: Turner Gill (1st season)
- Captains: Ronald Hilaire; Jeff Niedermier; Mike Newton; Drew Willy
- Home stadium: University at Buffalo Stadium

2008 Mid-American Conference football standings
	Conf.			Overall
Team	W		L	W		L
East Division
Buffalo x$	5	–	3	8	–	6
Bowling Green	4	–	4	6	–	6
Temple	4	–	4	5	–	7
Ohio	3	–	5	4	–	8
Akron	3	–	5	5	–	7
Kent State	3	–	5	4	–	8
Miami (OH)	1	–	7	2	–	10
West Division
Ball State x	8	–	0	12	–	2
Central Michigan	6	–	2	8	–	5
Western Michigan	6	–	2	9	–	4
Northern Illinois	5	–	3	6	–	7
Toledo	2	–	6	3	–	9
Eastern Michigan	2	–	6	3	–	9
Championship: Buffalo 42, Ball State 24
$ – Conference champion; x – Division champion/co-champions

The 2008 Buffalo Bulls football team represented the University at Buffalo as a member of the Mid-American Conference (MAC) during the 2008 NCAA Division I FBS football season. Led by third-year head coach Turner Gill, the Bulls compiled an overall record of 8–6 with a mark of 5–3 in conference play, winning the MAC's East Division title. Buffalo advanced to the MAC Championship Game, where the Bulls defeated Ball State to win the conference crown. Buffalo closed out the season with a loss to Connecticut in the International Bowl. The team played home games at the University at Buffalo Stadium in Amherst, New York.

With a 40–34 double overtime win over Bowling Green on November 21, the Bulls won the MAC East division and gained a berth to the MAC Championship Game for the first time. The win over Ball State in the conference title game was Buffalo's first against a ranked opponent, and ensured a winning season for the first time since Buffalo returned to the top-level of college football in 1999. The International Bowl was the program's first appearance in a bowl game, coming 50 years after the Bulls turned down their only previous bowl bid, to the Tangerine Bowl, when they were told by the bowl's organizers that their two African American players would not be allowed to play. About two dozen members of the 1958 Buffalo Bulls football team, which declined the Tangerine Bowl, served as honorary captains for the International Bowl. The Bulls received their first votes in the Coaches Poll after winning the MAC Championship Game, when UTEP coach Mike Price voted the Bulls No. 23 on his ballot.

On December 16, Buffalo announced that Gill had agreed to a contract extension and a raise.

== Schedule ==
Date	Time	Opponent	Site	TV	Result	Attendance
August 28	7:00 pm	UTEP*	University at Buffalo Stadium; Amherst, NY	TWCSN	W 42–17	16,656
September 6	6:00 pm	at Pittsburgh*	Heinz Field; Pittsburgh, PA	ESPN Plus	L 16–27	42,494
September 13	12:00 pm	Temple	University at Buffalo Stadium; Amherst, NY	ESPN Plus	W 30–28	18,333
September 20	2:00 pm	at No. 5 Missouri*	Faurot Field; Columbia, MO		L 21–42	65,566
September 27	4:00 pm	at Central Michigan	Kelly/Shorts Stadium; Mount Pleasant, MI		L 25–27	21,032
October 11	3:30 pm	Western Michigan	University at Buffalo Stadium; Amherst, NY	TWCSN	L 28–34 ^{OT}	15,025
October 18	3:30 pm	Army*^{†}	University at Buffalo Stadium; Amherst, NY	TWCSN	W 27–24 ^{OT}	21,719
October 28	7:00 pm	at Ohio	Peden Stadium; Athens, OH	ESPNU	W 32–19	10,042
November 4	7:30 pm	Miami (OH)	University at Buffalo Stadium; Amherst, NY	ESPN2	W 37–17	16,058
November 13	7:00 pm	at Akron	Rubber Bowl; Akron, OH	ESPNU	W 43–40 ^{4OT}	18,516
November 21	6:00 pm	at Bowling Green	Doyt Perry Stadium; Bowling Green, OH	BCSN	W 40–34 ^{2OT}	13,284
November 28	2:00 pm	Kent State	University at Buffalo Stadium; Amherst, NY	TWCSN	L 21–24	13,754
December 5	8:00 pm	vs. No. 12 Ball State	Ford Field; Detroit, MI (MAC Championship)	ESPN2	W 42–24	12,871
January 3	12:00 pm	vs. Connecticut*	Rogers Centre; Toronto, ON (International Bowl)	ESPN2	L 20–38	40,184
*Non-conference game; ^{†}Homecoming; Rankings from AP Poll released prior to the game; All times are in Eastern time

== Rankings ==
Ranking movements Legend: — = Not ranked
	Week																
Poll	Pre	1	2	3	4	5	6	7	8	9	10	11	12	13	14	15	Final
AP	—	—	—	—	—	—	—	—	—	—	—	—	—	—	—	—	—
Coaches	—	—	—	—	—	—	—	—	—	—	—	—	—	—	—	—	—
Harris	Not released				—	—	—	—	—	—	—	—	—	—	—	—	Not released
BCS	Not released							—	—	—	—	—	—	—	—	—	Not released
