= 2018 Dollar General Bowl =

College football bowl game

- 20th Dollar General Bowl
Buffalo Bulls	Troy Trojans
(10–3)	(9–3)
MAC	Sun Belt
32	42
Head coach: Lance Leipold	Head coach: Neal Brown
	1	2	3	4	Total
Buffalo	7	10	7	8	32
Troy	7	7	7	21	42
- Date: December 22, 2018
- Season: 2018
- Stadium: Ladd–Peebles Stadium
- Location: Mobile, Alabama
- MVP: Sawyer Smith (QB, Troy)
- Favorite: Buffalo by 2.5
- Referee: Jeff Flanagan (ACC)
- Attendance: 31,818
- Payout: US$1,500,000

United States TV coverage
- Network: ESPN
- Announcers: Anish Shroff, Ahmad Brooks and Roddy Jones

International TV coverage
- Network: ESPN Deportes

The 2018 Dollar General Bowl was a college football bowl game played on December 22, 2018. It was the 20th edition of the Dollar General Bowl, and one of the 2018–19 bowl games concluding the 2018 FBS football season. The game was sponsored by the Dollar General chain of variety stores. (Note: The bowl has undergone various name changes during its history, with this being the last of three editions contested as the Dollar General Bowl. Dollar General ended its sponsorship of the bowl in May 2019.)

== Teams ==
The game was played between teams from the Mid-American Conference (MAC) and the Sun Belt Conference.

=== Troy Trojans ===
On November 29, college football news organizations reported that Troy would play in the Dollar General Bowl, which was confirmed via an official announcement on December 2. The Trojans entered the bowl with a 10–3 record (7–1 in conference). This was Troy's third consecutive bowl appearance, following victories in the 2016 Dollar General Bowl and 2017 New Orleans Bowl.

=== Buffalo Bulls ===
Buffalo received and accepted a bid to the Dollar General Bowl on December 2. The Bulls had a 10–3 record on the year (7–1 in conference), losing to Northern Illinois in the MAC Championship Game. This was Buffalo's third bowl appearance, after losses in the 2009 International Bowl and 2013 Famous Idaho Potato Bowl.

== Game summary ==
=== Scoring summary ===
Scoring summary

Quarter	Time	Drive			Team	Scoring information	Score	
Quarter	Time	Plays	Yards	TOP	Team	Scoring information	UB	TROY
1	13:12	5	75	1:48	UB	Jaret Patterson 11-yard touchdown run, Adam Mitcheson kick good	7	0
1	11:47	3	74	1:25	TROY	Tray Eafford 60-yard touchdown reception from Sawyer Smith, Tyler Sumpter kick good	7	7
2	11:11	14	96	5:58	UB	Kevin Marks 1-yard touchdown run, Adam Mitcheson kick good	14	7
2	6:15	8	42	2:34	TROY	Damion Willis 7-yard touchdown reception from Sawyer Smith, Typer Sumpter kick good	14	14
2	0:52	10	41	3:16	UB	41-yard field goal by Adam Mitcheson	17	14
3	9:41	10	75	5:19	TROY	B.J. Smith 2-yard touchdown run, Tyler Sumpter kick good	17	21
3	5:23				UB	Fumble recovery returned 93 yards for touchdown by Tyrone Hill, Adam Mitcheson kick good	24	21
4	14:13	12	69	6:10	TROY	Damion Willis 2-yard touchdown reception from Sawyer Smith, Tyler Sumpter kick good	24	28
4	11:25	3	48	0:51	TROY	Sidney Davis 45-yard touchdown reception from Sawyer Smith, Tyler Sumpter kick good	24	35
4	7:24	10	69	4:01	UB	K. J. Osborn 3-yard touchdown reception from Tyree Jackson, 2-point pass good	32	35
4	3:09	1	20	0:05	TROY	Sidney Davis 20-yard touchdown run, Tyler Sumpter kick good	32	42
"TOP" = time of possession. For other American football terms, see Glossary of American football.							32	42

=== Statistics ===
	1	2	3	4	Total
Bulls	7	10	7	8	32
Trojans	7	7	7	21	42

Statistics	UB	TROY
First downs	20	21
Plays–yards	68–376	75–433
Rushes–yards	33–102	31–113
Passing yards	274	320
Passing: Comp–Att–Int	20–35–1	31–44–0
Time of possession	26:37	33:23

Team	Category	Player	Statistics
Buffalo	Passing	Tyree Jackson	20/35, 274 yds, 1 TD, 1 INT
Buffalo	Rushing	Jaret Patterson	15 car, 67 yds, 1 TD
Buffalo	Receiving	Antonio Nunn	4 rec, 87 yds
Troy	Passing	Sawyer Smith	31/44, 320 yds, 4 TD
Troy	Rushing	B.J. Smith	20 car, 93 yds, 1 TD
Troy	Receiving	Damion Willis	13 rec, 101 yds, 2 TD
