= Chad Salisbury =

American football player and coach (born 1976)

West Liberty Hilltoppers
- Title: Head coach

Personal information
- Born: July 21, 1976 (age 50); Perryopolis, Pennsylvania, U.S.
- Listed height: 6 ft 6 in (1.98 m)
- Listed weight: 240 lb (109 kg)

Career information
- Position: Quarterback
- High school: Frazier (Perryopolis)
- College: Buffalo
- NFL draft: 1999: undrafted

Career history

Playing
- New England Sea Wolves (2000); Toronto Phantoms (2001–2002); Chicago Rush (2003–2004); Columbus Destroyers (2005); Georgia Force (2005)*; Grand Rapids Rampage (2006–2007)
- * Offseason or practice squad member only

Coaching
- Los Angeles Avengers (2008) Quarterbacks coach & wide receivers coach; California (PA) (2009–2025) Offensive coordinator & quarterbacks coach; West Liberty (2026–present) Head coach

Awards and highlights
- Al Lucas Hero Team (2007); MEC Coach of the Year (2026)

Career AFL statistics
- Comp. / Att.: 1,051 / 1,684
- Passing yards: 12,109
- TD–INT: 217–60
- QB rating: 101.42
- Rushing TD: 11
- Stats at ArenaFan.com

Head coaching record
- Career: 7–1

Chad Thomas Salisbury (born July 21, 1976) is an American football coach and former quarterback. He is the offensive coordinator and quarterbacks coach for California University of Pennsylvania, positions he has held since 2009. He was formerly the quarterbacks and wide receivers coach for the Los Angeles Avengers.

== Early life and college ==
Salisbury attended Frazier High School, where he played football, basketball, and baseball. While there, he was a two-time All-State selection in football and basketball. After high school, he went to play football for both New Mexico State and Buffalo. He earned honorable mention All-America honors from the Football gazette after the 1997 season.

== Professional career ==
In his Arena Football League career, Salisbury played for five teams, but spent time with six total. He first joined the AFL with the New England Sea Wolves and moved with the team to Toronto when they became the Phantoms. He then played two seasons with the Chicago Rush. He played one season with the Columbus Destroyers, and was on the Georgia Force's practice squad before he finished his career by playing two seasons with the Grand Rapids Rampage.

== Coaching career ==
On August 25, 2007, Salisbury retired after sustaining a concussion. However, he still continued in football as a coach and athletic director at Byron Center High School. In August 2008, Salisbury was hired to the coaching staff of the Los Angeles Avengers to be the quarterbacks and wide receivers coach. Preceding his time as an Arena League Football coach Salisbury began his tenure at California University Of Pennsylvania as the Vulcans' quarterbacks coach. Prior to the start of the 2016 football season, Salisbury was promoted to the Vulcans' offensive coordinator position. During Salisbury's first season as offensive coordinator, The Vulcans' completed an undefeated regular season. The Vulcans compete at the NCAA Division II level and are a member of the Pennsylvania State Athletic Conference.

== Career statistics ==
=== Playing career ===
==== AFL ====
		Passing					Rushing		
Year	Team	Cmp	Att	Yds	TD	Int	Att	Yds	TD
2000	New England Sea Wolves	143	221	1759	32	6	3	16	2
2001	Toronto Phantoms	92	156	1186	21	9	7	8	2
2002	Toronto Phantoms	176	263	2186	30	13	1	−1	0
2003	Chicago Rush	64	95	677	13	7	3	5	1
2004	Chicago Rush	42	67	438	8	0	5	4	2
2005	Columbus Destroyers	33	63	380	5	4	5	44	2
2006	Grand Rapids Rampage	289	480	3239	58	13	15	−1	2
2007	Grand Rapids Rampage	212	339	2244	50	8	3	1	0

==== College ====
Season	Passing					Rushing		
Season	Cmp	Att	Yds	TD	Int	Att	Yds	TD
New Mexico State Aggies
1995	1	1	39	0	0	1	−8	0
1996	172	341	2,291	11	12	48	−97	3
Buffalo Bulls
1997	218	384	2,889	16	17	24	−92	0
1998	154	287	2,058	15	13	19	24	0
NCAA career	545	1,013	7,277	42	42	92	-173	3

=== Head coaching record ===
Year	Team	Overall	Conference	Standing	Bowl/playoffs
West Liberty Hilltoppers (Mountain East Conference) (2026–present)
2026	West Liberty	0–0	0–0		
West Liberty:		0–0	0–0		
Total:		0–0			
