= Drew Willy =

American football player (born 1986)

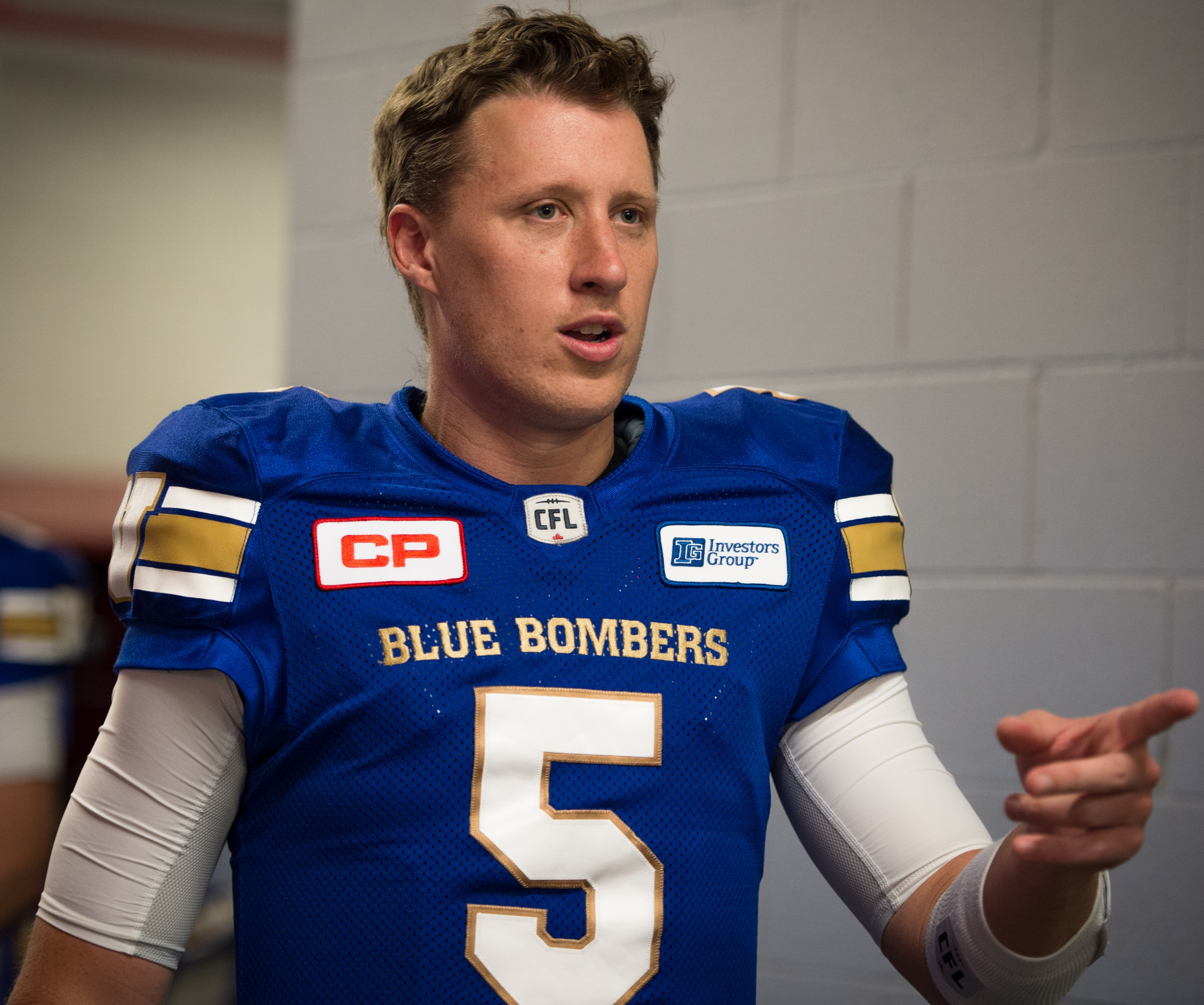
- Willy with the Winnipeg Blue Bombers in 2016

No. 5, 2, 16
- Position: Quarterback

Personal information
- Born: November 13, 1986 (age 40); Randolph, New Jersey, U.S.
- Listed height: 6 ft 4 in (1.93 m)
- Listed weight: 214 lb (97 kg)

Career information
- High school: Randolph
- College: Buffalo

Career history
- 2009: Baltimore Ravens*
- 2009: Indianapolis Colts
- 2010: Las Vegas Locomotives
- 2011: New York Jets*
- 2011: San Diego Chargers*
- 2012–2013: Saskatchewan Roughriders
- 2014–2016: Winnipeg Blue Bombers
- 2016: Toronto Argonauts
- 2017–2018: Montreal Alouettes
- * Offseason or practice squad member only

Awards and highlights
- Grey Cup champion (2013); UFL champion (2010); MAC champion (2008); CFL Top Performers of the Week (Weeks 1, 6 2014, Weeks 1, 6 2015)

Career CFL statistics
- Pass attempts: 1,243
- Pass completions: 833
- TD–INT: 43–32
- Passing yards: 9,652
- Passer rating: 91.1
- Stats at Pro Football Reference
- Stats at CFL.ca

Drew Michael Willy (born November 13, 1986) is an American former professional football player who was a quarterback in the Canadian Football League (CFL). He played college football at Buffalo Bulls and was signed by the Baltimore Ravens of the National Football League (NFL) as an undrafted free agent in 2009. Willy was also a member of the Indianapolis Colts, Las Vegas Locomotives, New York Jets, San Diego Chargers, and most notably the Saskatchewan Roughriders, Winnipeg Blue Bombers, Toronto Argonauts, and Montreal Alouettes of the CFL.

== Early life ==
Willy attended Randolph High School in Randolph, New Jersey, prior to choosing the University at Buffalo. At Randolph High, Willy set school records for career passing yards (5,387) and touchdowns (51).

== College career ==
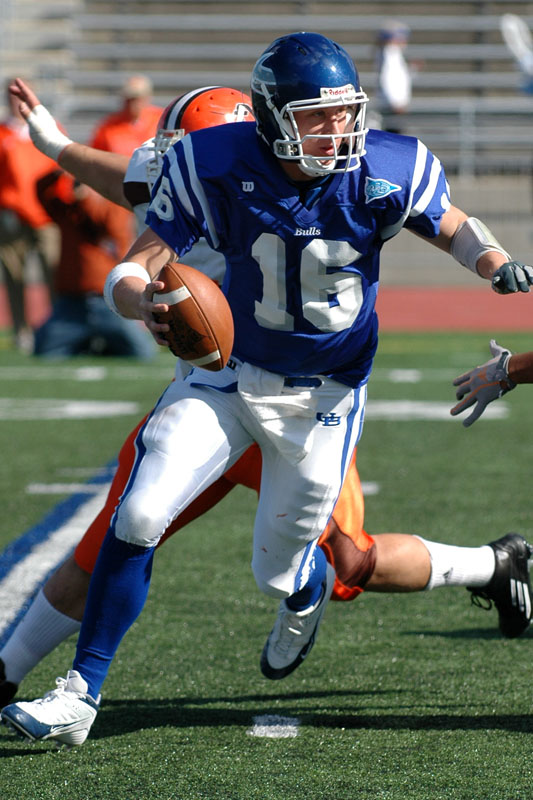
Willy during his tenure at Buffalo

At the University at Buffalo, Willy started each of his four seasons, including eight games as a true freshman. In 2008, he took Buffalo to their first MAC Championship Game, where they upset heavily favored and previously undefeated Ball State Cardinals led by Nate Davis. Prior to the 2009 NFL draft, he was invited to the 2009 NFL Combine and was considered a potential late-round draft choice.

Willy was the most prolific passer in Buffalo football history. As a four-year starter, he set school records for completions (849), attempts (1,322), passing yards (8,748), touchdowns (52), total offense (8,639), and completion percentage (64.2). During the final 20 games of his college career, Willy threw 36 touchdown passes and only six interceptions.

== Professional career ==
=== Baltimore Ravens ===
Willy signed with the Baltimore Ravens after going undrafted in the 2009 NFL draft on April 27, 2009. He was waived on June 18, 2009. He was re-signed on August 15 after a shoulder injury to quarterback John Beck, with the team placing defensive tackle Lamar Divens on injured reserve to make room for Willy on the roster only to be waived again on August 31.

=== Indianapolis Colts ===
Willy was signed to the Indianapolis Colts practice squad on December 9, 2009. He was promoted to the active roster on December 26, 2009. He was waived on December 29 and re-signed to the practice squad. He was signed to a futures contract on February 11, 2010. He was released by the Colts in July 2010.

=== Las Vegas Locomotives ===
Willy signed with the Las Vegas Locomotives of the United Football League in August 2010.

He made his UFL debut on October 23 in the place of injured Locos starting QB, Tim Rattay. He completed 18 of 29 passes that day for 191 yards and a touchdown. The Locos won the game against the Hartford Colonials, 24–21.

=== New York Jets ===
Willy was signed to a reserve/future contract with the New York Jets on January 7, 2011.

=== San Diego Chargers ===
The San Diego Chargers signed Willy to their practice squad on September 5, 2011.

=== Saskatchewan Roughriders ===
On February 28, 2012, it was announced that Willy had signed with the Saskatchewan Roughriders. Willy made his first CFL start on September 16, 2012, in Montreal against the Montreal Alouettes. He completed 22-of-35 passes for 225 yards and a touchdown with two interceptions in a losing effort. Willy earned his first CFL win as a starter on July 27, 2013, against the Hamilton Tiger-Cats where he completed 14 of 25 pass attempts for 269 yards with three touchdowns and zero interceptions in relief of the injured Darian Durant. In two seasons with the Roughriders, Willy was utilized in a backup role. He dressed in all 36 games over his two years with the team, and started four, passing for 1,182 yards with nine touchdowns and five interceptions. Willy was also a part of the 101st Grey Cup champion team in 2013.

=== Winnipeg Blue Bombers ===
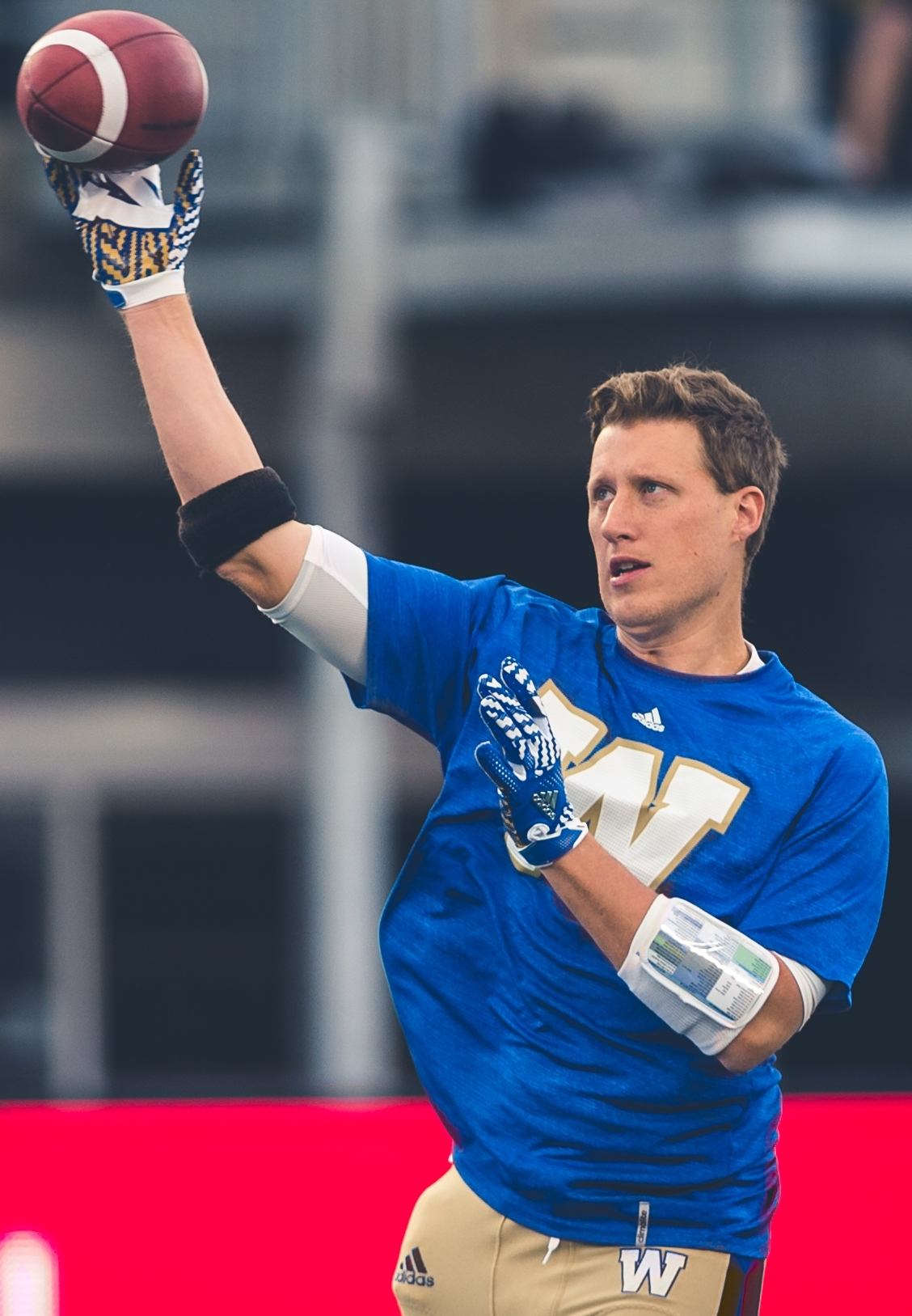
Willy with the Blue Bombers in 2016

On February 6, 2014, Willy was traded to the Blue Bombers for non-import wide receiver Jade Etienne. In his first year as a starter Willy lead the Bombers to a record of 7 wins and 11 losses. He played in 17 of the 18 regular season games. In the spring of 2015 Willy and the Blue bombers agreed to a contract extension through the 2017 season. In week 7 of the 2015 CFL season Willy left the game with a right knee injury: Two days later it was announced that Willy suffered a tibial plateau fracture and partial tear of the posterior cruciate ligament. He was expected to miss 6 to 8 weeks, possibly longer.

=== Toronto Argonauts ===
On September 11, 2016, Willy was traded to the Toronto Argonauts in exchange for defensive back T.J. Heath, a 1st Round Pick in 2017, and a 3rd Round Pick in 2018. Willy made his first appearance in Week 14, and his first start the following week. Following his start for the Argos, Willy was announced as the starting quarterback for the remaining 4 games of the season. However, after making three starts Willy was once again relegated to the backup role and incumbent Ricky Ray took over the starting role in Week 18. On January 2, 2017, Drew Willy and the Argos agreed to a contract restructuring which extended his contract through the 2018 season. Willy was reportedly scheduled to receive a $100,000 bonus later on January 15. Were Willy to start every game in 2017, he would have earned just over $305,000 and more than $415,000 in 2018. However, Willy was cut by the Argos on June 17, 2017.

=== Montreal Alouettes ===
On June 26, 2017, the Montreal Alouettes announced that they had signed Willy to a one-year contract. Willy appeared in 12 games for the Alouettes in 2017, completing 54 of 79 pass attempts for 547 yards with one touchdown and two interceptions. Willy was re-signed by the Alouettes on the second day of free agency. At the start of training camp Willy and Matt Shiltz were the leading candidates to be the Als' starting quarterback to begin the 2018 season. Willy started the first three games of the season before suffering a concussion in the third quarter in the team's Week 3 victory over the Roughriders. Willy would miss the following game against the Redblacks, (played by Jeff Mathews) but returned to play against the Stampeders in Week 6: However, Willy left the game with a hand injury, and did not return. Following Montreal's 2018 season, which saw the team trade for Johnny Manziel, and sign backup quarterbacks Matthews, Antonio Pipkin and Vernon Adams to extensions, Willy was released in December.

In August 2019 the Blue Bombers reached out to Willy following an injury to starting quarterback Matt Nichols, however Willy and the Bombers were unable to come to an agreement and he remained a free-agent.

=== CFL statistics ===
		Passing									Rushing
Year	Team	Games	Started	Att	Comp	Pct	Yards	TD	Int	Rating	Att	Yards	Avg	Long	TD	Fumb
2012	SSK	18	2	95	69	72.6	709	5	4	93.7	33	115	3.5	18	4	1
2013	SSK	18	2	52	32	61.5	473	4	1	108.9	18	22	1.2	3	0	1
2014	WPG	17	17	478	305	63.8	3,769	14	16	83.9	36	224	6.2	18	2	5
2015	WPG	7	7	156	107	68.6	1,434	8	3	106.6	19	161	8.5	30	0	1
2016	WPG	11	5	137	191	71.7	1,473	5	4	92.2	13	84	6.5	20	0	2
2016	TOR	5	4	77	113	68.1	681	3	1	92.2	9	91	10.1	34	0	2
2017	MTL	12	2	54	79	68.4	547	1	2	81.6	17	66	3.9	12	1	0
2018	MTL	4	4	77	113	65.8	566	3	1	94.1	6	22	3.7	8	0	1
CFL totals		92	43	833	1,243	67.0	9,652	43	32	91.1	151	785	5.2	34	7	13
