= Tyree Jackson =

American football player (born 1997)

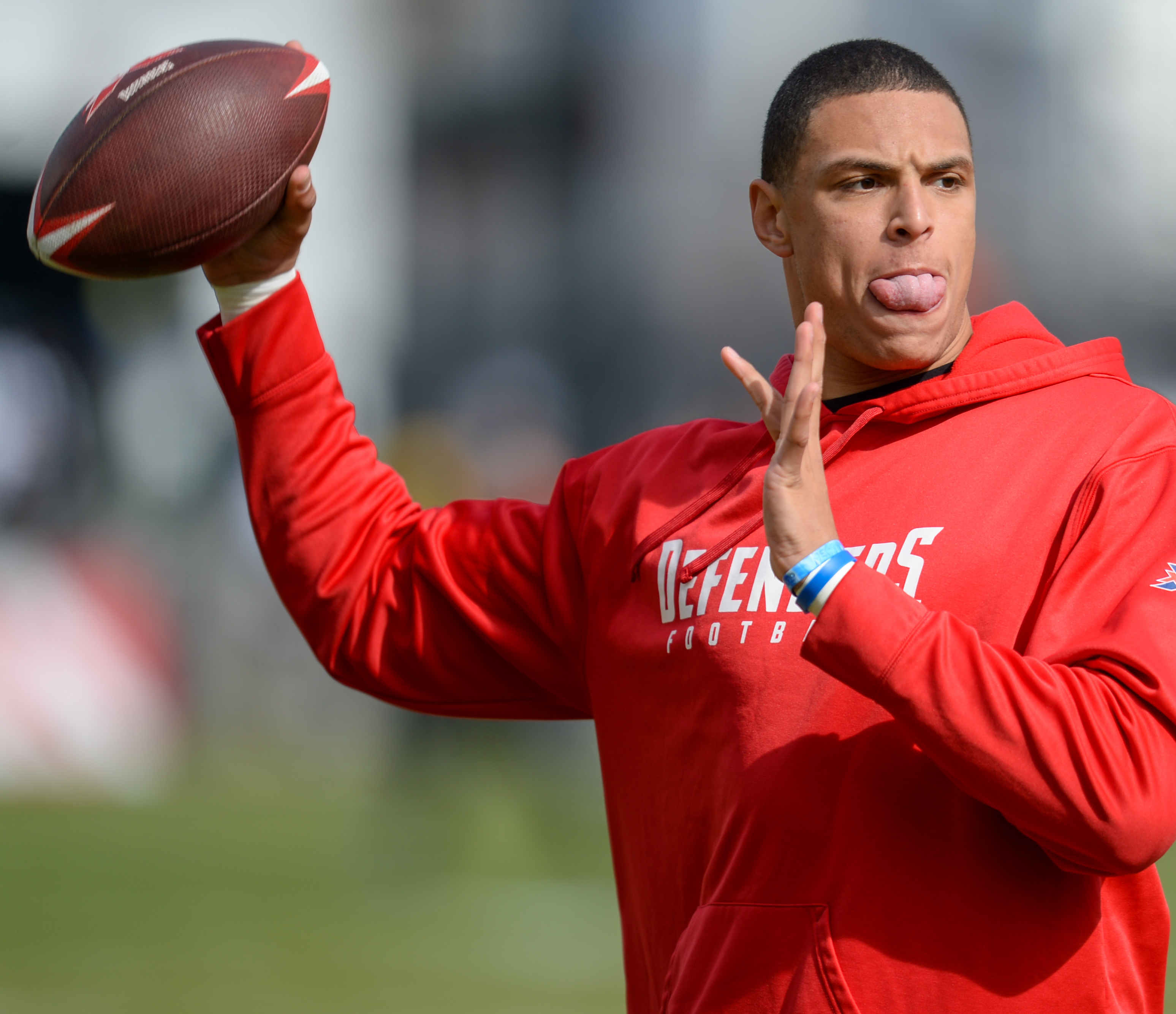
- Jackson with the DC Defenders in 2020

Profile
- Position: Tight end

Personal information
- Born: November 7, 1997 (age 29); Norton Shores, Michigan, U.S.
- Listed height: 6 ft 7 in (2.01 m)
- Listed weight: 249 lb (113 kg)

Career information
- High school: Mona Shores (Norton Shores)
- College: Buffalo (2016–2018)
- NFL draft: 2019: undrafted

Career history
- Buffalo Bills (2019)*; DC Defenders (2020); Philadelphia Eagles (2021–2022); New York Giants (2023); Washington Commanders (2024–2025)*
- * Offseason or practice squad member only

Awards and highlights
- MAC Offensive Player of the Year (2018); First-team All-MAC (2018)

Career NFL statistics as of 2025
- Receptions: 3
- Receiving yards: 22
- Receiving touchdowns: 1
- Stats at Pro Football Reference

Tyree Romello Jackson (born November 7, 1997) is a former American professional football tight end. He played college football as a quarterback for the Buffalo Bulls and was signed as an undrafted free agent by the Buffalo Bills in 2019. Jackson has also played for the DC Defenders of the XFL and the NFL's Philadelphia Eagles, New York Giants, and Washington Commanders.

== Early life ==
Jackson attended Mona Shores High School in Norton Shores, Michigan, where he was the starting varsity QB all four years of high school. During his career, he passed for 4,491 yards with 50 touchdowns, had 8,149 yards of total offense and had a 24–18 record. He committed to the University at Buffalo to play college football after receiving offers from Central Michigan, Eastern Michigan, Western Michigan and UConn.

== College career ==
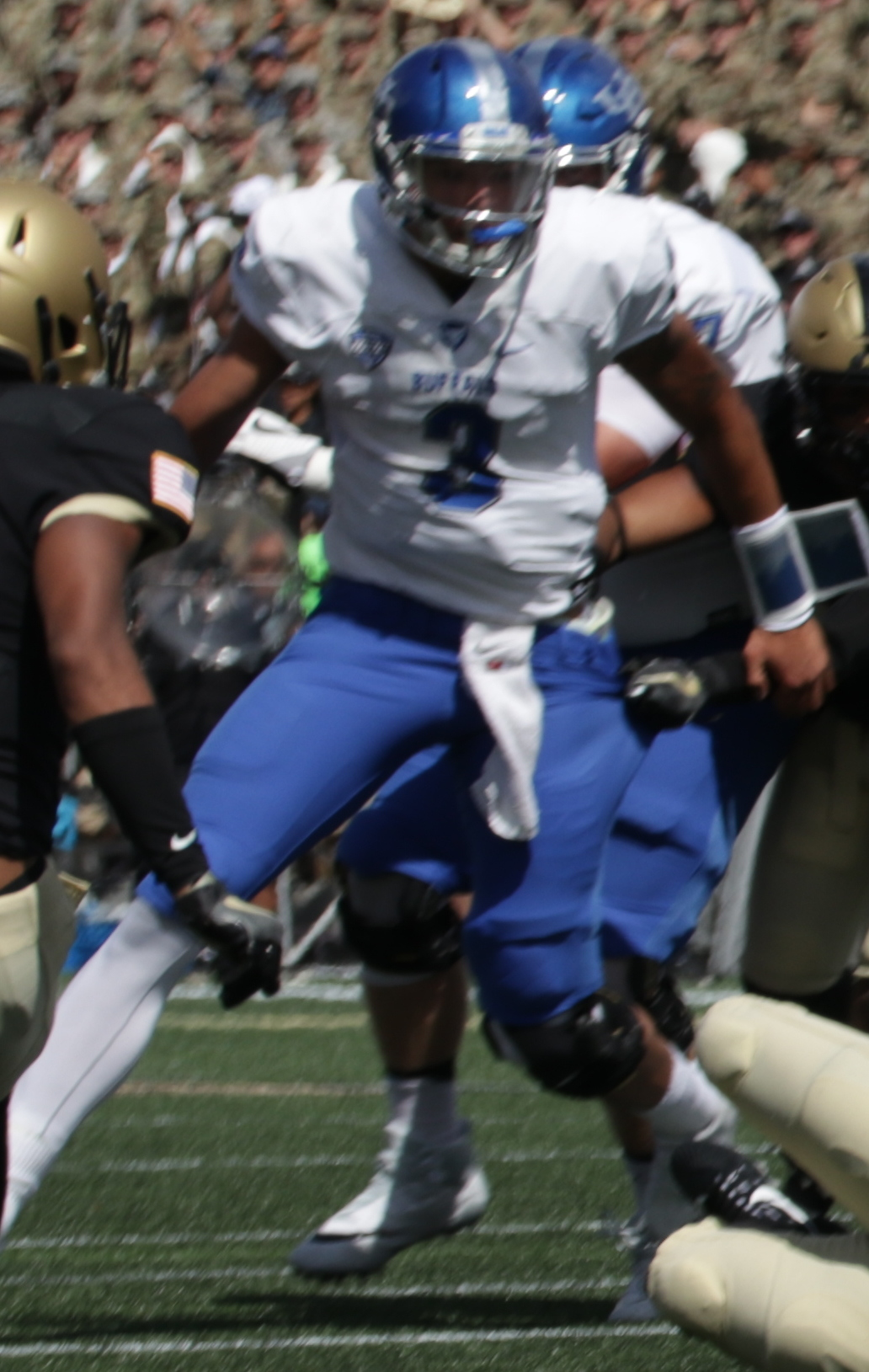
Jackson with the Buffalo Bulls in 2017

After redshirting his first year at Buffalo in 2015, Jackson played in 10 games and made nine starts in 2016. He finished the season completing 165 of 311 passes for 1,772 yards, nine touchdowns and nine interceptions. As a sophomore in 2017, he started eight games and missed four due to an injury. He completed 143 of 237 passes for 2,096 yards, 12 touchdowns and three interceptions. Jackson returned as the starter in 2018, where he was named MAC Offensive Player of the Year and lead the Bulls to a 10–4 season, a MAC East division title and a bowl game appearance in the Dollar General Bowl. On January 6, 2019, Jackson announced that he would forgo his senior season to pursue a career in the NFL. He was invited to the 2019 Senior Bowl, playing for the South team and being named team MVP.

=== Statistics ===
College statistics
Season	Passing								Rushing			
Season	Cmp	Att	Pct	Yds	Y/A	TD	Int	Rtg	Att	Yds	Avg	TD
2016	165	311	53.1	1,772	5.7	9	9	104.7	99	399	4.0	5
2017	143	237	60.3	2,096	8.8	12	3	148.8	47	197	4.2	4
2018	225	407	55.3	3,131	7.7	28	12	136.7	55	161	2.9	7
Career	533	955	55.8	6,999	7.3	49	24	129.3	201	757	3.8	16

== Professional career ==
Pre-draft measurables
Height	Weight	Arm length	Hand span	40-yard dash	10-yard split	20-yard split	20-yard shuttle	Three-cone drill	Vertical jump	Broad jump	Wonderlic
6 ft 7 in (2.01 m)	249 lb (113 kg)	34 1/4 in (0.87 m)	10 1/4 in (0.26 m)	4.59 s	1.59 s	2.67 s	4.28 s	7.09 s	34.5 in (0.88 m)	10 ft 0 in (3.05 m)	25
All values from NFL Combine

=== Buffalo Bills ===
Following the conclusion of the 2019 NFL draft, Jackson signed with the Buffalo Bills as an undrafted free agent on April 27, 2019. Jackson started the fourth game of the preseason at quarterback and led a comeback to erase a 23-6 deficit with under four minutes remaining in the fourth quarter. He was waived during final roster cuts on August 31, 2019.

=== DC Defenders ===
In October 2019, Jackson was selected in the ninth round in the 2020 XFL draft by the DC Defenders. During the first two games, both Defenders victories under starter Cardale Jones, Jackson's only statistic was one rush for 5 yards. Jackson saw increased but limited snaps during the next two games which were both blowout losses for the Defenders, including a shutout to the previously winless Tampa Bay Vipers in week 4. Jackson entered in relief of Jones in week 5, kick-starting a Defenders' victory by going 9–14 for 39 yards and a touchdown, caught by Khari Lee. Within the next few days, the rest of the season was canceled due to the COVID-19 pandemic. Jackson finished the shortened 5-game XFL season by going 11–18 for 46 yards and a touchdown, and 9 rushes for 28 yards. He had his contract terminated when the league suspended operations on April 10, 2020.

=== Philadelphia Eagles ===
On January 7, 2021, the Philadelphia Eagles signed Jackson to a reserve/futures contract as a tight end. During his transition from quarterback to tight end, Jackson was having a very promising training camp, with some believing that he could earn a roster spot. However, he suffered a fractured bone in his back on August 17. He was placed on injured reserve on September 2, 2021.

He was activated on November 6 and made his NFL debut on November 7, appearing in 14 plays on offense and 4 plays on special teams. On November 21, he was targeted with a pass for the first time in his career, but the throw from Jalen Hurts was incomplete. Two weeks later, he started a game for the first time in his career. In the final game of the regular season on January 8, 2022, Jackson caught the first pass of his NFL career, a three-yard shovel pass from Gardner Minshew, for his first career touchdown. Later in that game, he tore his ACL, ending his season. He was officially placed on the injured reserve list two days later. He was placed on the Active/PUP list on July 27.

He was placed on the reserve list on August 23, to start the 2022 season. He was activated from the PUP list on November 16. On December 23, Jackson was placed on season–ending injured reserve. Without Jackson, the Eagles reached Super Bowl LVII but lost 38–35 to the Kansas City Chiefs. On April 24, 2023, the Jackson signed his exclusive rights tender with the Eagles for the 2023 season. On August 29, Jackson was released.

=== New York Giants ===
On August 30, 2023, the New York Giants signed Jackson to their practice squad. He was promoted to the active roster on January 6, 2024. On August 16, Jackson was designated as waived/injured by the Giants.

=== Washington Commanders ===
On December 17, 2024, Jackson signed with the Washington Commanders' practice squad. On January 28, 2025, he signed a reserve/future contract with the Commanders. Jackson was placed on injured reserve on August 2.

=== Retirement ===
After seven years of professional football Jackson announced his retirement via his LinkedIn post.
