= Mike Newton (American football) =

American football player (born 1987)

No. 38
- Position: Safety

Personal information
- Born: November 11, 1987 (age 38); Pasadena, Maryland, U.S.
- Listed height: 5 ft 10 in (1.78 m)
- Listed weight: 197 lb (89 kg)

Career information
- High school: Towson (MD) Calvert Hall
- College: Buffalo
- NFL draft: 2010: undrafted

Career history
- Indianapolis Colts (2010–2012)

Awards and highlights
- Second-team All-MAC (2009)

Career NFL statistics
- Total tackles: 6
- Fumble recoveries: 1
- Stats at Pro Football Reference

DeJuan Michael Newton (born November 11, 1987) is an American former professional football player who was a safety in the National Football League (NFL). He played college football for the Buffalo Bulls and was signed by the Indianapolis Colts as an undrafted free agent in 2010.

Newton was signed by the Indianapolis Colts as an undrafted free agent on April 30, 2010. He was waived on September 4, 2010, and signed to the Colts' practice squad on September 6. He was promoted to the Colts' active roster on October 5. He was waived/injured on August 28, 2011. He was released with an injury settlement on September 1. On February 9, 2012, Newton resigned with the Colts.
