= 2017 Eastern Michigan Eagles football team =

American college football season

2017 Eastern Michigan Eagles football
- Conference: Mid-American Conference
- West Division
- Record: 5–7 (3–5 MAC)
- Head coach: Chris Creighton (4th season)
- Offensive coordinator: Aaron Keen (1st season)
- Offensive scheme: Spread
- Defensive coordinator: Neal Neathery (2nd season)
- Base defense: 4–2–5
- Home stadium: Rynearson Stadium

2017 Mid-American Conference football standings
	Conf.			Overall
Team	W		L	W		L
East Division
Akron xy	6	–	2	7	–	7
Ohio	5	–	3	9	–	4
Miami (OH)	4	–	4	5	–	7
Buffalo	4	–	4	6	–	6
Bowling Green	2	–	6	2	–	10
Kent State	1	–	7	2	–	10
West Division
Toledo xy$	7	–	1	11	–	3
Central Michigan	6	–	2	8	–	5
Northern Illinois	6	–	2	8	–	5
Western Michigan	4	–	4	6	–	6
Eastern Michigan	3	–	5	5	–	7
Ball State	0	–	8	2	–	10
Championship: Toledo 45, Akron 28
$ – Conference champion; x – Division champion/co-champions; y – Championship game participant

The 2017 Eastern Michigan Eagles football team represented Eastern Michigan University in the 2017 NCAA Division I FBS football season. They were led by fourth-year head coach Chris Creighton and played their home games at Rynearson Stadium in Ypsilanti, Michigan as members of the West Division of the Mid-American Conference. The Eagles finished the season 5–7, 3–5 in MAC play to finish in fifth place in the West Division.

== Schedule ==
Date	Time	Opponent	Site	TV	Result	Attendance
September 1	6:30 p.m.	Charlotte*	Rynearson Stadium; Ypsilanti, MI	ESPN3	W 24–7	12,823
September 9	3:30 p.m.	at Rutgers*	High Point Solutions Stadium; Piscataway, NJ	BTN	W 16–13	37,661
September 23	2:00 p.m.	Ohio	Rynearson Stadium; Ypsilanti, MI	ESPN3	L 20–27 ^{2OT}	11,373
September 30	12:00 p.m.	at Kentucky*	Kroger Field; Lexington, KY	SECN	L 20–24	50,593
October 7	12:00 p.m.	at Toledo	Glass Bowl; Toledo, OH	CBSSN	L 15–20	22,681
October 14	12:00 p.m.	at Army*	Michie Stadium; West Point, NY	CBSSN	L 27–28	34,333
October 21	2:00 p.m.	Western Michigan^{†}	Rynearson Stadium; Ypsilanti, MI (Michigan MAC Trophy)	ESPN3	L 17–20 ^{OT}	17,575
October 26	7:00 p.m.	at Northern Illinois	Huskie Stadium; DeKalb, IL	CBSSN	L 27–30 ^{OT}	8,872
November 2	6:00 p.m.	Ball State	Rynearson Stadium; Ypsilanti, MI	CBSSN	W 56–14	23,465
November 8	7:00 p.m.	at Central Michigan	Kelly/Shorts Stadium; Mount Pleasant, MI (Michigan MAC Trophy/rivalry)	ESPNU	L 30–42	9,700
November 15	7:00 p.m.	at Miami (OH)	Yager Stadium; Oxford, OH	CBSSN	W 27–24	11,851
November 21	7:00 p.m.	Bowling Green	Rynearson Stadium; Ypsilanti, MI	ESPN3	W 34–31	8,413
*Non-conference game; ^{†}Homecoming; All times are in Eastern time

== Game summaries ==
=== Charlotte ===
	1	2	3	4	Total
49ers	7	0	0	0	7
Eagles	14	3	7	0	24

=== At Rutgers ===
	1	2	3	4	Total
Eagles	0	13	0	3	16
Scarlet Knights	6	7	0	0	13

=== Ohio ===
	1	2	3	4	OT	2OT	Total
Bobcats	3	7	3	0	7	7	27
Eagles	3	3	0	7	7	0	20

=== At Kentucky ===
	1	2	3	4	Total
Eagles	7	7	0	6	20
Wildcats	7	7	3	7	24

=== At Toledo ===
	1	2	3	4	Total
Eagles	6	0	3	6	15
Rockets	3	7	7	3	20

=== At Army ===
	1	2	3	4	Total
Eagles	7	7	0	13	27
Black Knights	7	7	7	7	28

=== Western Michigan ===
	1	2	3	4	OT	Total
Broncos	0	10	7	0	3	20
Eagles	0	7	3	7	0	17

=== At Northern Illinois ===
	1	2	3	4	OT	Total
Eagles	0	14	3	7	3	27
Huskies	0	7	3	14	6	30

=== Ball State ===
	1	2	3	4	Total
Cardinals	7	7	0	0	14
Eagles	14	21	14	7	56

=== At Central Michigan ===
	1	2	3	4	Total
Eagles	7	10	0	13	30
Chippewas	14	14	7	7	42

=== At Miami (OH) ===
	1	2	3	4	Total
Eagles	7	6	14	0	27
RedHawks	0	17	0	7	24

=== Bowling Green ===
	1	2	3	4	Total
Falcons	10	7	14	0	31
Eagles	13	7	14	0	34
