= 2017 Central Michigan Chippewas football team =

American college football season

2017 Central Michigan Chippewas football

Famous Idaho Potato Bowl, L 14–37 vs. Wyoming
- Conference: Mid-American Conference
- West Division
- Record: 8–5 (6–2 MAC)
- Head coach: John Bonamego (3rd season)
- Offensive coordinator: Chris Ostrowsky (1st season)
- Defensive coordinator: Greg Colby (3rd season)
- Home stadium: Kelly/Shorts Stadium

2017 Mid-American Conference football standings
	Conf.			Overall
Team	W		L	W		L
East Division
Akron xy	6	–	2	7	–	7
Ohio	5	–	3	9	–	4
Miami (OH)	4	–	4	5	–	7
Buffalo	4	–	4	6	–	6
Bowling Green	2	–	6	2	–	10
Kent State	1	–	7	2	–	10
West Division
Toledo xy$	7	–	1	11	–	3
Central Michigan	6	–	2	8	–	5
Northern Illinois	6	–	2	8	–	5
Western Michigan	4	–	4	6	–	6
Eastern Michigan	3	–	5	5	–	7
Ball State	0	–	8	2	–	10
Championship: Toledo 45, Akron 28
$ – Conference champion; x – Division champion/co-champions; y – Championship game participant

The 2017 Central Michigan Chippewas football team represented Central Michigan University in the 2017 NCAA Division I FBS football season. They were led by third-year head coach John Bonamego and played their home games at Kelly/Shorts Stadium as members of the West Division of the Mid-American Conference. They finished the season 8–5, 6–2 in MAC play to finish in a tie for second place in the West Division. They received an invitation to the Famous Idaho Potato Bowl where they lost to Wyoming.

== Preseason ==
Central Michigan was picked to finish in fifth place in the MAC West Division in a preseason poll of league media.

== Schedule ==
Date	Time	Opponent	Site	TV	Result	Attendance
August 31	7:00 p.m.	Rhode Island*	Kelly/Shorts Stadium; Mount Pleasant, MI	ESPN3	W 30–27 ^{3OT}	16,311
September 9	3:00 p.m.	at Kansas*	Memorial Stadium; Lawrence, KS	FSN	W 45–27	28,531
September 16	3:30 p.m.	at Syracuse*	Carrier Dome; Syracuse, NY	ACCN Extra	L 17–41	33,004
September 23	3:30 p.m.	Miami (OH)	Kelly/Shorts Stadium; Mount Pleasant, MI	ESPN3	L 14–31	17,193
September 30	1:00 p.m.	at Boston College*	Alumni Stadium; Chestnut Hill, MA	ACCN Extra	L 8–28	27,036
October 7	2:00 p.m.	at Ohio	Peden Stadium; Athens, OH	ESPN3	W 26–23	23,570
October 14	3:30 p.m.	Toledo^{†}	Kelly/Shorts Stadium; Mount Pleasant, MI	ESPN3	L 10–30	15,572
October 21	3:00 p.m.	at Ball State	Scheumann Stadium; Muncie, IN	ESPN3	W 56–9	15,850
November 1	8:00 p.m.	at Western Michigan	Waldo Stadium; Kalamazoo, MI (rivalry)	ESPN2	W 35–28	11,776
November 8	8:00 p.m.	Eastern Michigan	Kelly/Shorts Stadium; Mount Pleasant, MI (rivalry)	ESPNU	W 42–30	9,700
November 14	7:00 p.m.	at Kent State	Dix Stadium; Kent, OH	ESPNU	W 42–23	5,580
November 24	12:00 p.m.	Northern Illinois	Kelly/Shorts Stadium; Mount Pleasant, MI	CBSSN	W 31–24	8,744
December 22	4:00 p.m.	vs. Wyoming*	Albertsons Stadium; Boise, ID (Famous Idaho Potato Bowl)	ESPN	L 14–37	16,512
*Non-conference game; ^{†}Homecoming; All times are in Eastern time

== Game summaries ==
=== Rhode Island ===
	1	2	3	4	OT	2OT	3OT	Total
Rams	0	0	7	14	3	0	3	27
Chippewas	0	13	0	8	3	0	6	30

=== At Kansas ===
	1	2	3	4	Total
Chippewas	0	24	7	14	45
Jayhawks	3	3	14	7	27

=== At Syracuse ===
	1	2	3	4	Total
Chippewas	10	7	0	0	17
Orange	10	14	17	0	41

=== Miami (OH) ===
	1	2	3	4	Total
RedHawks	14	14	3	0	31
Chippewas	0	14	0	0	14

=== At Boston College ===
	1	2	3	4	Total
Chippewas	2	6	0	0	8
Eagles	14	7	7	0	28

=== At Ohio ===
	1	2	3	4	Total
Chippewas	7	6	6	7	26
Bobcats	7	7	0	9	23

=== Toledo ===
	1	2	3	4	Total
Rockets	7	10	0	13	30
Chippewas	0	0	3	7	10

=== At Ball State ===
	1	2	3	4	Total
Chippewas	7	21	7	21	56
Cardinals	3	3	3	0	9

=== At Western Michigan ===
	1	2	3	4	Total
Chippewas	7	0	7	21	35
Broncos	14	7	7	0	28

In an increasingly heavy downpour in Kalamazoo, the Chips avenged their 49-10 loss to the Broncos the year before. During the battle between the two bitter in-state rivals, the Chippewas fell behind 28-14 in the 3rd quarter. The Chips then staged a dramatic comeback in the 4th quarter, scoring 21 unanswered points, capped off by Shane Morris’ 77 yard touchdown pass to Corey Willis with 2:37 left in the game to defeat the Broncos for the first time since 2013 by a score of 35-28.

=== Eastern Michigan ===
	1	2	3	4	Total
Eagles	7	10	0	13	30
Chippewas	14	14	7	7	42

=== At Kent State ===
	1	2	3	4	Total
Chippewas	7	21	0	14	42
Golden Flashes	3	14	0	6	23

=== Northern Illinois ===
	1	2	3	4	Total
Huskies	14	3	0	7	24
Chippewas	0	0	17	14	31

=== Vs. Wyoming–Famous Idaho Potato Bowl ===
	1	2	3	4	Total
Chippewas	7	0	7	0	14
Cowboys	21	6	3	7	37
