= 2017 Western Michigan Broncos football team =

American college football season

2017 Western Michigan Broncos football
- Conference: Mid-American Conference
- West Division
- Record: 6–6 (4–4 MAC)
- Head coach: Tim Lester (1st season)
- Offensive coordinator: Kevin Johns (1st season)
- Co-offensive coordinator: Jake Moreland (1st season)
- Offensive scheme: West Coast
- Defensive coordinator: Tim Daoust (1st season)
- Co-defensive coordinator: Lou Esposito (1st season)
- Base defense: 4–3 or 4–2–5
- Home stadium: Waldo Stadium

2017 Mid-American Conference football standings
	Conf.			Overall
Team	W		L	W		L
East Division
Akron xy	6	–	2	7	–	7
Ohio	5	–	3	9	–	4
Miami (OH)	4	–	4	5	–	7
Buffalo	4	–	4	6	–	6
Bowling Green	2	–	6	2	–	10
Kent State	1	–	7	2	–	10
West Division
Toledo xy$	7	–	1	11	–	3
Central Michigan	6	–	2	8	–	5
Northern Illinois	6	–	2	8	–	5
Western Michigan	4	–	4	6	–	6
Eastern Michigan	3	–	5	5	–	7
Ball State	0	–	8	2	–	10
Championship: Toledo 45, Akron 28
$ – Conference champion; x – Division champion/co-champions; y – Championship game participant

The 2017 Western Michigan Broncos football team represented Western Michigan University (WMU) in the 2017 NCAA Division I FBS football season. They were led by first-year head coach Tim Lester and played their home games at Waldo Stadium as a member of the West Division of the Mid-American Conference. The Broncos finished the season 6–6, 4–4 to finish in fourth place in the West Division. Despite being bowl eligible, the Broncos did not receive an invite to a bowl game.

The team set the FBS record for most combined points scored in a game (139) and tied the record for most overtime periods (seven) in their 71–68 victory over Buffalo.

== Preseason ==
Following the 2016 season, head coach P. J. Fleck left the school to take the head coaching position at Minnesota. On January 13, 2017, the school hired Tim Lester as head coach.

Western Michigan was picked to finish second in the MAC West Division by members of the league's media. They received one vote to win the 2017 MAC Championship Game.

== Schedule ==
Date	Time	Opponent	Site	TV	Result	Attendance
September 2	5:15 pm	at No. 4 USC*	Los Angeles Memorial Coliseum; Los Angeles, CA	P12N	L 31–49	61,125
September 9	3:30 pm	at Michigan State*	Spartan Stadium; East Lansing, MI	BTN	L 14–28	72,910
September 16	7:00 pm	Idaho*	Waldo Stadium; Kalamazoo, MI	ESPN3	W 37–28	25,732
September 23	7:00 pm	Wagner*	Waldo Stadium; Kalamazoo, MI	ESPN3	W 49–14	13,438
September 30	7:00 pm	Ball State	Waldo Stadium; Kalamazoo, MI	ESPN3	W 55–3	18,216
October 7	3:30 pm	at Buffalo	University at Buffalo Stadium; Amherst, NY	ESPNU	W 71–68 ^{7OT}	17,048
October 15	1:00 pm	Akron^{†}	Waldo Stadium; Kalamazoo, MI	CBSSN	L 13–14	16,568
October 21	2:00 pm	at Eastern Michigan	Rynearson Stadium; Ypsilanti, MI (Michigan MAC Trophy)	ESPN3	W 20–17 ^{OT}	17,575
November 1	8:00 pm	Central Michigan	Waldo Stadium; Kalamazoo, MI (rivalry)	ESPN2	L 28–35	11,776
November 8	7:00 pm	Kent State	Waldo Stadium; Kalamazoo, MI	CBSSN	W 48–20	9,584
November 15	7:00 pm	at Northern Illinois	Huskie Stadium; DeKalb, IL	ESPN2	L 31–35	7,732
November 24	11:30 am	at Toledo	Glass Bowl; Toledo, OH	ESPNU	L 10–37	17,948
*Non-conference game; ^{†}Homecoming; Rankings from AP Poll released prior to the game; All times are in Eastern time

== Game summaries ==
=== At No. 4 USC ===
Western Michigan Broncos at No. 4 USC Trojans – Game summary

Quarter	1	2	3	4	Total
Broncos	7	7	7	10	31
No. 4 Trojans	7	7	7	28	49

at Los Angeles Memorial Coliseum, Los Angeles, California

- Date: September 2
- Game time: 5:15 p.m. EDT/2:15 p.m. PDT
- Game weather: Cloudy, 98 °F (37 °C)
- Game attendance: 61,125
- Referee: Terry Leyden
- TV announcers (P12N): Roxy Bernstein, Anthony Herron, and Lewis Johnson
- Box score, Recap

Game information
First quarter
- USC – Ronald Jones II 16-yard run (Chase McGarth kick), 13:00. Trojans 7–0. Drive: 6 plays, 75 yards, 2:00.
- WMU – Jamauri Bogan 4-yard run (Josh Grant kick), 6:07. Tied 7–7. Drive: 8 plays, 59 yards, 3:32.

Second quarter

- WMU – Jon Wassink 7-yard run (Josh Grant kick), 14:53. Broncos 14–7. Drive: 11 plays, 84 yards, 5:08.
- USC – Ronald Jones II 1-yard run (Chase McGarth kick), 4:21. Tied 14–14. Drive: 8 plays, 45 yards, 3:35.

Third quarter

- WMU – Jon Wassink 27-yard pass from Keishawn Watson (Josh Grant kick), 9:11. Broncos 21–14. Drive: 9 plays, 75 yards, 5:49.
- USC – Sam Darnold 11-yard run (Chase McGarth kick), 0:34. Tied 21–21. Drive: 10 plays, 83 yards, 4:03.

Fourth quarter

- USC – Stephen Carr 1-yard run (Chase McGarth kick), 8:07. Trojans 28–21. Drive: 12 plays, 56 yards, 4:08.
- WMU – Darius Phillips 100-yard kickoff return (Josh Grant kick), 7:54. Tied 28–28.
- USC – Ronald Jones II 37-yard run (Chase McGarth kick), 6:57. Trojans 35–28. Drive: 3 plays, 83 yards, 0:57.
- WMU – Josh Grant 43-yard field goal, 4:37. Trojans 35–31. Drive: 5 plays, 40 yards, 2:20.
- USC – Stephen Carr 52-yard run (Chase McGarth kick), 3:49. Trojans 42–31. Drive: 3 plays, 66 yards, 0:48.
- USC – Marvell Tell 37-yard interception return (Chase McGarth kick), 3:13. Trojans 49–31.

Statistics	WMU	USC
First downs	24	25
Total yards	357	521
Rushing yards	263	232
Passing yards	94	289
Turnovers	1	2
Time of possession	34:38	25:22

Team	Category	Player	Statistics
Western Michigan	Passing	Jon Wassink	11/22, 67 yards, INT
Western Michigan	Rushing	LeVante Bellamy	9 rushes, 102 yards
Western Michigan	Receiving	Anton Curtis	3 receptions, 30 yards
USC	Passing	Sam Darnold	23/33, 289 yards, 2 INT
USC	Rushing	Ronald Jones II	18 rushes, 159 yards, 3 TD
USC	Receiving	Deontay Burnett	7 receptions, 142 yards

WMU opened the season with a 49–31 loss to No. 4 USC. Despite losing by 18 points, USC struggled to stop WMU's running game as the Broncos led the Trojans in team rushing yards 263–232 and led time of possession 34:40–25:20. WMU also led the game 21–14 with 9:11 left in the third quarter and the game was tied at 28 with 7:54 left. Redshirt freshman Jon Wassink started the game at quarterback for WMU and caught a touchdown pass and also rushed for a touchdown. Senior cornerback and kick returner Darius Phillips intercepted a pass and returned a kickoff 100 yards for a touchdown.

=== At Michigan State ===
Western Michigan Broncos at Michigan State Spartans – Game summary

Quarter	1	2	3	4	Total
Broncos	0	0	7	7	14
Spartans	7	7	7	7	28

at Spartan Stadium, East Lansing, Michigan

- Date: September 9
- Game time: 3:30 p.m. EDT
- Game weather: Partly cloudy, 65 °F (18 °C)
- Game attendance: 72,910
- Referee: Daniel Capron
- TV announcers (BTN): Brandon Gaudin and Glen Mason
- Box score, Recap

Statistics	WMU	MSU
First downs		
Total yards		
Rushing yards		
Passing yards		
Turnovers		
Time of possession		

Team	Category	Player	Statistics
Western Michigan	Passing		
Western Michigan	Rushing		
Western Michigan	Receiving		
Michigan State	Passing		
Michigan State	Rushing		
Michigan State	Receiving		

The Broncos traveled to face Michigan State in East Lansing on September 9. The WMU offense struggled throughout as the MSU defense held the Broncos to 195 yard on offense. The only bright spot for the Broncos was Phillips who forced a fumble and returned it 67 yards for a touchdown early in the third quarter to cut the Spartans lead to 14–7. After the Spartans moved the lead to 28–7 on an LJ Scott two-yard touchdown run, Phillips answered again, returning the ensuing kickoff 100 yards for the Broncos second touchdown of the game. MSU's defense took over from there, halting the last WMU drive on fourth down at the Spartan 15 yard line.

=== Idaho ===
Idaho Vandals at Western Michigan Broncos – Game summary

Quarter	1	2	3	4	Total
Vandals	7	7	14	0	28
Broncos	3	3	13	18	37

at Waldo Stadium, Kalamazoo, Michigan

- Date: September 16
- Game time: 7:00 p.m. EDT
- Game weather: Sunny and clear, 83 °F (28 °C)
- Game attendance: 25,732
- Referee: Greg Sujack
- TV announcers (ESPN3): Dan Gutowsky and Tyoka Jackson
- Box score, Recap

Statistics	IDHO	WMU
First downs		
Total yards		
Rushing yards		
Passing yards		
Turnovers		
Time of possession		

Team	Category	Player	Statistics
Idaho	Passing		
Idaho	Rushing		
Idaho	Receiving		
Western Michigan	Passing		
Western Michigan	Rushing		
Western Michigan	Receiving		

The Broncos welcomed the Vandals to Waldo Stadium on September 16 for the team's first home game. The Broncos trailed 14–6 at the half and 28–19 as the third quarter ended as they looked like they were headed for their third consecutive defeat to open the season. However, John Wassink ran for two scores in the fourth quarter and the Broncos added a field goal to pull out the win 37–28.

=== Wagner ===
WMU finished the non-conference portion of their schedule against Wagner at Waldo Stadium. Quarterback Jon Wassink threw a career-high three touchdown passes as the Broncos blew out the Eagles 49–14. WMU racked up 527 total yards while limiting Wagner to 113 yards. The win moved WMU to 2–2 on the season.

=== Ball State ===
The Broncos began the MAC season with a bang, blowing out Ball State 55–3. Wassink again threw three touchdown passes as the Broncos Obbie Jackson recovered a fumble on the opening kickoff and returned it 21 yards for a touchdown to get the Broncos started. The Broncos out-gained the Cardinals 414–238 as they forced two Ball State turnovers. The win moved the Broncos to 3–2 on the season.

=== At Buffalo ===
Western Michigan Broncos at Buffalo Bulls – Game summary

Quarter	1	2	3	4	OT	2OT	3OT	4OT	5OT	6OT	7OT	Total
Broncos	10	7	7	7	7	7	0	8	6	6	6	71
Bulls	14	0	0	17	7	7	0	8	6	6	3	68

at University at Buffalo Stadium, Amherst, New York

- Date: October 7
- Game time: 3:30 p.m. EDT
- Game weather: Mostly cloudy, 78 °F (26 °C)
- Game attendance: 17,048
- Referee: Ron Hudson
- TV announcers (ESPNU): Doug Sherman and Dustin Fox
- Box score, Recap

Game information
First quarter
- WMU – LeVante Bellamy 66-yard run (Josh Grant kick), 13:44. Broncos 7–0. Drive: 3 plays, 75 yards, 1:16.
- WMU – Josh Grant 44-yard field goal, 11:04. Broncos 10–0. Drive: 7 plays, 19 yards, 2:20.
- BUF – Jacob Martinez 64-yard pass from Drew Anderson (Adam Mitcheson kick), 10:16. Broncos 10–7. Drive: 2 plays, 75 yards, 0:42.
- BUF – Emmanuel Reed 1-yard un (Adam Mitcheson kick), 4:51. Bulls 14–10. Drive: 11 plays, 70 yards, 3:43.

Second quarter

- WMU – D'Wayne Eskridge 48-yard pass from Jon Wassink (Josh Grant kick), 11:19. Broncos 17–14. Drive: 11 plays, 90 yards, 4:45.

Third quarter

- WMU – Jarvion Franklin 20-yard pass from Jon Wassink (Josh Grant kick), 8:03. Broncos 24–14. Drive: 7 plays, 65 yards, 3:35.

Fourth quarter

- BUF – Anthony Johnson 8-yard pass from Drew Anderson (Adam Mitcheson kick), 11:59. Broncos 24–21. Drive: 7 plays, 96 yards, 2:47.
- BUF – K. J. Osborn 54-yard pass from Drew Anderson (Adam Mitcheson kick), 8:47. Bulls 28–24. Drive: 4 plays, 84 yards, 1:41.
- WMU – Donnie Ernsberger 24-yard pass from Jon Wassink (Josh Grant kick), 4:45. Broncos 31–28. Drive: 8 plays, 65 yards, 3:53.
- BUF – Adam Mitcheson 34-yard field goal, 0:34. Tied 31–31. Drive: 9 plays, 65 yards, 4:05.

First overtime

- BUF – Kamathi Holsey 5-yard pass from Drew Anderson (Adam Mitcheson kick). Bulls 38–31. Drive: 7 plays, 25 yards.
- WMU – Donnie Ernsberger 14-yard pass from Jon Wassink (Josh Grant kick). Tied 38–38. Drive: 4 plays, 25 yards.

Second overtime

- WMU – Jon Wassink 13-yard pass from Keishawn Watson (Josh Grant kick). Broncos 45–38. Drive: 3 plays, 25 yards.
- BUF – Anthony Johnson 25-yard pass from Drew Anderson (Adam Mitcheson kick). Tied 45–45. Drive: 2 plays, 25 yards.

Third overtime

- No scoring plays

Fourth overtime

- WMU – Jarvion Franklin 2-yard run (Keishawn Watson run). Broncos 53–45. Drive: 5 plays, 25 yards.
- BUF – K. J. Osborn 4-yard pass from Drew Anderson (Anthony Johnson pass to Drew Anderson). Tied 53–53. Drive: 5 plays, 25 yards.

Fifth overtime

- BUF – K. J. Osborn 27-yard pass from Drew Anderson (pass failed). Bulls 59–53. Drive: 3 plays, 25 yards.
- WMU – Jarvion Franklin 6-yard run (run failed). Tied 59–59. Drive: 4 plays, 25 yards.

Sixth overtime

- WMU – Keishawn Watson 5-yard pass from Jon Wassink (run failed). Broncos 65–59. Drive: 4 plays, 25 yards.
- BUF – Drew Anderson 2-yard run (run failed). Tied 65–65. Drive: 3 plays, 25 yards.

Seventh overtime

- BUF – Adam Mitcheson 25-yard field goal. Bulls 68–65. Drive: 6 plays, 17 yards.
- WMU – Jarvion Franklin 12-yard run. Broncos 71–68. Drive: 4 plays, 25 yards.

Statistics	WMU	BUF
First downs	33	30
Total yards	645	683
Rushing yards	376	86
Passing yards	269	597
Turnovers	2	2
Time of possession	31:01	28:59

Team	Category	Player	Statistics
Western Michigan	Passing	Jon Wassink	23/29, 256 yards, 5 TD, INT
Western Michigan	Rushing	Jarvion Franklin	37 rushes, 176 yards, 3 TD
Western Michigan	Receiving	D'Wayne Eskridge	4 receptions, 97 yards, TD
Buffalo	Passing	Drew Anderson	35/61, 597 yards, 7 TD
Buffalo	Rushing	Theo Anderson	16 rushes, 44 yards
Buffalo	Receiving	Anthony Johnson	11 receptions, 195 yards, 2 TD

The Broncos defeated Buffalo 71–68 in seven overtimes in a game that broke the record for most points in an NCAA Division I Football Bowl Subdivision (FBS) game and tied the record for most overtime (OT) periods in a single game. The 139 points beat the previous record of 137 points scored by Pittsburgh and Syracuse in 2016.

WMU had a 10 point lead early in the fourth quarter before Buffalo scored touchdowns on consecutive drives to take a 4 point lead. WMU regained the lead with 4:45 to go in regulation with a touchdown to tight end Donnie Ernsberger. Buffalo tied the game with a 34 yard field goal with 34 seconds left. WMU had a chance to win the game with a 52 yard field goal, but it was blocked and the game entered OT 31–31.

In OT, each team had opportunities to win the game. In the third OT, Buffalo turned the ball over with a fumble, but WMU missed a 29 yard field goal that would have won the game. In the fifth OT, WMU scored a touchdown but failed on the two-point conversion. Buffalo also scored a touchdown and failed on the two-point conversion that would have won the game. In the seventh and final OT, Buffalo had to settled for a field goal and WMU won the game with a Jarvion Franklin 12 yard touchdown run.

=== Akron ===
In a game that was postponed a day due to heavy flooding in Waldo Stadium, WMU lost to Akron 14–13. The Broncos trailed 14–3 at halftime and could only score 10 points in the 4th quarter. WMU had the ball with 45 seconds left in the game and drove to the Akron 39 yard line, but could not attempt a 56-yard field goal before time expired. Franklin led the Broncos with 130 yards rushing on 31 carries. WMU outgained Akron 426 total yards to 215.

After the game was postponed, 1 to 1.4 million gallons of water were removed from the field overnight. The game was originally scheduled to be broadcast on the CBS Sports Network (CBSSN), but due to the postponement, was not televised. This was the first MAC game to be played on a Sunday since 2006.

=== At Eastern Michigan ===
The following week, the Broncos traveled to face rival Eastern Michigan. After taking a 10–7 lead at halftime, Jarvion Franklin's seven-yard rush gave the Broncos a 17–10 lead heading into the fourth quarter. However, the Eagles tied it up early in the fourth quarter and moved in to field goal range as the clock was running out. A 37-yard field goal attempt was no good as time expired to send the game in to overtime. In overtime, WMU was forced to settle for a field goal and the Bronco defense prevented the Eagles from scoring a touchdown. The Eagles missed another field goal, this one from 24 yards out, to give the Broncos the 20–17 win. Franklin rushed for 104 yards and a touchdown in the game as the Broncos moved to 5–3 on the season.

=== Central Michigan ===
The Broncos jumped out early to a 14–0 lead against rival Central Michigan. They took a 21–7 lead at the half on the strength of three rushing touchdowns. Jarvion Franklin's second touchdown of the game gave the WMU a 28–14 lead with just over eight minutes remaining in the third quarter. However, the Chippewas roared back, scoring touchdowns on three of their next four possessions to pull out the 35–28 win and earn the Cannon Trophy. The loss dropped WMU to 5–4 on the season.

=== Kent State ===
As Western Michigan returned home to take on Kent State, the Bronco defense took control of the game. Scoring three touchdowns on two interception returns and one fumble return, the Bronco defense helped give WMU the easy 48–20 win. Jarvion Franklin rushed for 191 yards including a 72-yard touchdown run to give the Broncos the lead for good as the first quarter ended. In addition to scoring three touchdowns, the Bronco defense limited the Golden Flashes to 281 yards in the game. The win moved the Broncos to 6–4 on the season and made them bowl eligible.

=== At Northern Illinois ===
On a windy Wednesday night game, the Broncos traveled to DeKalb to face Northern Illinois. Jarvion Franklin rushed for 115 yards and a touchdown in the game, but the Broncos still trailed 21–14 at the half. WMU took the lead in the third on a Reece Goddard touchdown run and pass to give the Broncos a 28–21 lead going into the fourth quarter. However, NIU scored twice in the fourth quarter and the Broncos could only manage a field goal as WMU fell 35–31. The loss dropped the Broncos to 6–5 on the season and ended any chance to win the MAC East Division.

=== At Toledo ===
In the final regular season game, the Broncos traveled to Toledo as the Rockets looked to clinch a trip to the MAC Championship. The Rockets manhandled the Broncos, taking a 24–3 lead early in the third quarter. A Tyron Arnett 26-yard touchdown pass from Reece Goddard narrowed the lead to 24–10 with four minutes left in the third, but the Broncos could not score again as Toledo clinched the MAC West division with a 37–10 win. The loss dropped the Broncos to 6–6 on the season.

=== Conference Players of the Week ===
Jarvion Franklin, a senior running back, was named MAC West Offensive Player of the Week for Week 6. Franklin had 37 carries for 176 yards and four touchdowns (three rushing, one receiving) in WMU's 71–68, seven overtime victory over Buffalo. Franklin had just 4 yards rushing in the first half, 70 yards in the second half, and 102 yards in the overtime periods. He scored three touchdowns in the overtimes. He also had one reception for 20 yards and a touchdown in the game.

Darius Phillips was named the MAC Special Teams Player of the Week for the first two weeks of the season. In Week 1, he returned a kickoff 100 yards for a touchdown in a 49–31 loss to No. 4 USC. He had four total kickoff returns for 168 yards and the touchdown. Phillips also had an interception that he returned for 20 yards in the game. In the Week 2 loss against Michigan State, Phillips returned another kickoff 100 yards for a touchdown. He had four kickoff returns for 181 total yards. In the game, he also forced a fumbled and returned the ball 67 yards for a touchdown. Phillips accounted for the only two touchdowns WMU scored in the game. Phillips has three touchdowns on the season (two kickoff returns and one interception return).
