= 2017 Miami RedHawks football team =

American college football season

2017 Miami RedHawks football
- Conference: Mid-American Conference
- East Division
- Record: 5–7 (4–4 MAC)
- Head coach: Chuck Martin (4th season)
- Co-offensive coordinators: George Barnett (4th season); Eric Koehler (4th season)
- Offensive scheme: Multiple
- Co-defensive coordinators: Matt Pawlowski (4th season); John Hauser (2nd season)
- Base defense: 4–3
- Home stadium: Yager Stadium

2017 Mid-American Conference football standings
	Conf.			Overall
Team	W		L	W		L
East Division
Akron xy	6	–	2	7	–	7
Ohio	5	–	3	9	–	4
Miami (OH)	4	–	4	5	–	7
Buffalo	4	–	4	6	–	6
Bowling Green	2	–	6	2	–	10
Kent State	1	–	7	2	–	10
West Division
Toledo xy$	7	–	1	11	–	3
Central Michigan	6	–	2	8	–	5
Northern Illinois	6	–	2	8	–	5
Western Michigan	4	–	4	6	–	6
Eastern Michigan	3	–	5	5	–	7
Ball State	0	–	8	2	–	10
Championship: Toledo 45, Akron 28
$ – Conference champion; x – Division champion/co-champions; y – Championship game participant

The 2017 Miami RedHawks football team represented Miami University in the 2017 NCAA Division I FBS football season. They were led by fourth-year head coach Chuck Martin and played their home games at Yager Stadium in Oxford, Ohio as members of the East Division of the Mid-American Conference. They finished the season 5–7, 4–4 in MAC play to finish in a tie for third place in the East Division.

== Preseason ==
In a preseason poll of league media, Miami was picked to finish in second place in the East Division, though they received more first place votes than Ohio. They received one vote to win the MAC Championship Game.

== Coaching staff ==
Name	Title
Chuck Martin	Head coach
George Barnett	Associate head coach/co-offensive coordinator/offensive line coach
Eric Koehler	Co-offensive coordinator/quarterbacks coach
Matt Pawlowski	Co-defensive coordinator/linebackers coach
John Hauser	Co-defensive coordinator/Cornerbacks coach
Bill Brechin	Wide Receivers/Returns coach
Joe Palcic	Safeties/punting coach
Corey Brown	Defensive line coach
Israel Woolfork	Running backs/Kickoffs coach
Pat Welsh	Tight ends coach

== Schedule ==
Miami announced their 2017 football schedule on March 1, 2017.

Date	Time	Opponent	Site	TV	Result	Attendance
September 2	6:30 p.m.	at Marshall*	Joan C. Edwards Stadium; Huntington, WV	STADIUM	L 26–31	22,463
September 9	3:30 p.m.	Austin Peay*	Yager Stadium; Oxford, OH	ESPN3	W 31–10	15,960
September 16	8:00 p.m.	Cincinnati*^{†}	Yager Stadium; Oxford, OH (Victory Bell)	FOX 19	L 17–21	21,811
September 23	3:30 p.m.	at Central Michigan	Kelly/Shorts Stadium; Mount Pleasant, MI	ESPN3	W 31–14	17,193
September 30	5:00 p.m.	at No. 22 Notre Dame*	Notre Dame Stadium; Notre Dame, IN	NBCSN	L 17–52	77,622
October 7	2:30 p.m.	Bowling Green	Yager Stadium; Oxford, OH	ESPN3	L 29–37	22,428
October 14	3:30 p.m.	at Kent State	Dix Stadium; Kent, OH	ESPN3	L 14–17	20,537
October 21	2:30 p.m.	Buffalo	Yager Stadium; Oxford, OH	ESPN3	W 24–14	13,803
October 31	8:00 p.m.	at Ohio	Peden Stadium; Athens, OH (Battle of the Bricks)	ESPN2	L 28–45	18,096
November 7	7:30 p.m.	Akron	Yager Stadium; Oxford, OH	ESPN2	W 24–14	12,813
November 15	7:00 p.m.	Eastern Michigan	Yager Stadium; Oxford, OH	CBSSN	L 24–27	11,851
November 21	7:00 p.m.	at Ball State	Scheumann Stadium; Muncie, IN	ESPN3	W 28–7	5,374
*Non-conference game; ^{†}Homecoming; Rankings from AP Poll released prior to the game; All times are in Eastern time

== Game summaries ==
=== At Marshall ===
	1	2	3	4	Total
RedHawks	3	10	7	6	26
Thundering Herd	7	14	7	3	31

=== Austin Peay ===
	1	2	3	4	Total
Governors	7	0	3	0	10
RedHawks	7	14	0	10	31

=== Cincinnati ===
	1	2	3	4	Total
Bearcats	3	0	0	18	21
RedHawks	7	0	7	3	17

=== At Central Michigan ===
	1	2	3	4	Total
RedHawks	14	14	3	0	31
Chippewas	0	14	0	0	14

=== At Notre Dame ===
	1	2	3	4	Total
RedHawks	7	7	3	0	17
No. 22 Fighting Irish	28	17	0	7	52

=== Bowling Green ===
	1	2	3	4	Total
Falcons	3	14	7	13	37
RedHawks	6	13	10	0	29

=== At Kent State ===
	1	2	3	4	Total
RedHawks	0	14	0	0	14
Golden Flashes	0	3	14	0	17

=== Buffalo ===
	1	2	3	4	Total
Bulls	0	7	0	7	14
RedHawks	10	0	14	0	24

=== At Ohio ===
	1	2	3	4	Total
RedHawks	14	7	7	0	28
Bobcats	14	14	7	10	45

=== Akron ===
	1	2	3	4	Total
Zips	7	0	0	7	14
RedHawks	7	3	14	0	24

=== Eastern Michigan ===
	1	2	3	4	Total
Eagles	7	6	14	0	27
RedHawks	0	17	0	7	24

=== At Ball State ===
	1	2	3	4	Total
RedHawks	14	14	0	0	28
Cardinals	0	0	0	7	7
