= 2017 Bowling Green Falcons football team =

American college football season

2017 Bowling Green Falcons football
- Conference: Mid-American Conference
- East Division
- Record: 2–10 (2–6 MAC)
- Head coach: Mike Jinks (2nd season)
- Co-offensive coordinators: Kevin Kilmer (2nd season); Andy Padron (2nd season)
- Offensive scheme: Spread
- Defensive coordinator: Perry Eliano (2nd season)
- Base defense: 4–3
- Home stadium: Doyt Perry Stadium

2017 Mid-American Conference football standings
	Conf.			Overall
Team	W		L	W		L
East Division
Akron xy	6	–	2	7	–	7
Ohio	5	–	3	9	–	4
Miami (OH)	4	–	4	5	–	7
Buffalo	4	–	4	6	–	6
Bowling Green	2	–	6	2	–	10
Kent State	1	–	7	2	–	10
West Division
Toledo xy$	7	–	1	11	–	3
Central Michigan	6	–	2	8	–	5
Northern Illinois	6	–	2	8	–	5
Western Michigan	4	–	4	6	–	6
Eastern Michigan	3	–	5	5	–	7
Ball State	0	–	8	2	–	10
Championship: Toledo 45, Akron 28
$ – Conference champion; x – Division champion/co-champions; y – Championship game participant

The 2017 Bowling Green Falcons football team represented Bowling Green State University in the 2017 NCAA Division I FBS football season. The Falcons were led by second-year head coach Mike Jinks and played their home games at Doyt Perry Stadium in Bowling Green, Ohio as members of the East Division of the Mid-American Conference. They finished the season 2–10, 2–6 in MAC play to finish in fifth place in the East Division.

== Preseason ==
In a preseason poll of league media, Bowling Green was picked to finish in third place in the East Division.

== Coaching staff ==
Name	Title	Years at BGSU
Mike Jinks	Head coach	2
Perry Eliano	Associate head coach/defensive coordinator	2
Kevin Kilmer	Co-offensive coordinator/wide receivers coach	2
Andy Padron	Co-offensive coordinator/quarterbacks coach	2
Matt Brock	Special teams coordinator/linebackers coach	2
Marcus White	Defensive line coach	2
Stephen Hamby	Offensive line coach	2
Mike Mickens	Cornerbacks coach	4
Seth Doege	Receivers Coach	2
Ryan Downard	Safeties Coach	2
Clint Killough	Defensive graduate assistant	1

== Schedule ==
Date	Time	Opponent	Site	TV	Result	Attendance
September 2	12:00 p.m.	at Michigan State*	Spartan Stadium; East Lansing, MI	ESPNU	L 10–35	71,202
September 9	6:00 p.m.	South Dakota*	Doyt Perry Stadium; Bowling Green, OH	ESPN3	L 27–35	17,912
September 16	7:30 p.m.	at Northwestern*	Ryan Field; Evanston, IL	BTN	L 7–49	33,706
September 23	7:00 p.m.	at Middle Tennessee*	Johnny "Red" Floyd Stadium; Murfreesboro, TN	ESPN3	L 13–24	16,523
September 30	6:00 p.m.	Akron	Doyt Perry Stadium; Bowling Green, OH	ESPN3	L 23–34	15,111
October 7	2:30 p.m.	at Miami (OH)	Yager Stadium; Oxford, OH	ESPN3	W 37–29	22,428
October 14	3:30 p.m.	Ohio^{†}	Doyt Perry Stadium; Bowling Green, OH	ESPN3	L 30–48	17,641
October 21	2:00 p.m.	Northern Illinois	Doyt Perry Stadium; Bowling Green, OH	ESPN3	L 17–48	12,092
October 31	8:00 p.m.	at Kent State	Dix Stadium; Kent, OH (Anniversary Award)	ESPNU	W 44–16	7,140
November 7	7:30 p.m.	at Buffalo	University at Buffalo Stadium; Amherst, NY	ESPNU	L 28–38	12,205
November 15	8:00 p.m.	Toledo	Doyt Perry Stadium; Bowling Green, OH (rivalry)	ESPNU	L 37–66	16,649
November 21	7:00 p.m.	at Eastern Michigan	Rynearson Stadium; Ypsilanti, MI	ESPN3	L 31–34	8,413
*Non-conference game; ^{†}Homecoming; All times are in Eastern time

== Game summaries ==
=== At Michigan State ===
	1	2	3	4	Total
Falcons	3	0	0	7	10
Spartans	0	14	21	0	35

=== South Dakota ===
	1	2	3	4	Total
Coyotes	21	0	7	7	35
Falcons	3	6	7	11	27

=== At Northwestern ===
	1	2	3	4	Total
Falcons	7	0	0	0	7
Wildcats	14	21	0	14	49

=== At Middle Tennessee ===
	1	2	3	4	Total
Falcons	7	3	3	0	13
Blue Raiders	7	14	0	3	24

=== Akron ===
	1	2	3	4	Total
Zips	13	7	7	7	34
Falcons	6	7	10	0	23

=== At Miami (OH) ===
	1	2	3	4	Total
Falcons	3	14	7	13	37
RedHawks	6	13	10	0	29

=== Ohio ===
	1	2	3	4	Total
Bobcats	0	21	6	21	48
Falcons	6	10	7	7	30

=== Northern Illinois ===
	1	2	3	4	Total
Huskies	14	17	10	7	48
Falcons	7	0	3	7	17

=== At Kent State ===
	1	2	3	4	Total
Falcons	17	3	14	10	44
Golden Flashes	0	9	0	7	16

=== At Buffalo ===
	1	2	3	4	Total
Falcons	7	7	7	7	28
Bulls	21	0	7	10	38

=== Toledo ===
	1	2	3	4	Total
Rockets	14	10	28	14	66
Falcons	7	14	7	9	37

=== At Eastern Michigan ===
	1	2	3	4	Total
Falcons	10	7	14	0	31
Eagles	13	7	14	0	34
