= Paul Haynes (American football) =

American football player and coach (born 1969)

Current position
- Title: Secondary coach
- Team: Wisconsin
- Conference: Big Ten

Biographical details
- Born: July 11, 1969 (age 57); Columbus, Ohio, U.S.

Playing career
- 1987–1991: Kent State
- Position: Defensive back

Coaching career (HC unless noted)
- 1993: St. Francis DeSales HS (OH) (assistant)
- 1994: Bowling Green (GA)
- 1995–1996: Ferris State (DB)
- 1997–1998: Northern Iowa (RB/DB)
- 1999: Kent State (DB)
- 2000: Kent State (AHC/S)
- 2001: Jacksonville Jaguars (DQC)
- 2002: Louisville (DB)
- 2003–2004: Michigan State (DB)
- 2005–2010: Ohio State (DB)
- 2011: Ohio State (co-DC/S)
- 2012: Arkansas (DC/DB)
- 2013–2017: Kent State
- 2018–2019: Michigan State (DB)
- 2020–2021: Minnesota (CB)
- 2022: Minnesota (co-DC/CB)
- 2023–2025: Wisconsin (CB)
- 2026–present: Wisconsin (SC)

Head coaching record
- Overall: 14–45

Paul Jeffrey Haynes III (born July 11, 1969) is an American college football coach and former player. He is the cornerbacks coach for the University of Wisconsin–Madison, a position he has held since 2023. He was the head football coach at Kent State University from 2013 to 2017. Haynes was an assistant coach at the high school, collegiate, and professional levels for 20 years, including stints as defensive coordinator at Ohio State University and the University of Arkansas. Before his coaching career, he was a four-year letterman as a defensive back at Kent State between 1987 and 1991.

== Early life and education ==
Born in Columbus, Ohio, Haynes graduated from St. Francis DeSales High School and lettered in football, basketball, and track while in high school. Graduating in 1987, Haynes enrolled at Kent State University that year and walked on to the Kent State Golden Flashes football team as a defensive back and led the team in interceptions in his freshman season, in which Kent State finished 7–4 (5–3 and second place in the MAC). Missing the 1989 season with a knee injury, Haynes earned letters for the 1988, 1990, and 1991 seasons and ended his collegiate career with 440 career tackles and second-team All-MAC honors in his junior and senior seasons. Haynes completed his bachelor's degree in criminal justice at Kent State in 1992.

== Coaching career ==
In 1993, Haynes returned to St. Francis DeSales High School as secondary coach. The next year, he began graduate studies in counseling at Bowling Green State University and served as a graduate assistant on the Bowling Green Falcons football team for the 1994 season. From 1995 to 1996, Haynes was defensive backs and special teams coach at Division II Ferris State. He moved up to the Division I-AA level at Northern Iowa in 1997 again as a defensive backs coach.

In 1999, Haynes returned to Kent State to join Dean Pees's staff as defensive backs coach; Haynes coached the safeties and moved up to assistant head coach the following season. Haynes got his first NFL job in 2001 as defensive quality control coach for the Jacksonville Jaguars under Tom Coughlin before returning to the college level in 2002 as defensive backs coach at Louisville under John L. Smith. When Smith became head coach at Michigan State in 2003, Haynes moved there and again served as defensive backs coach.

From 2005 to 2011, Haynes was defensive backs coach at Ohio State under Jim Tressel (2005 to 2010) and Luke Fickell (2011); Haynes also was co-defensive coordinator in 2011. During this period, Ohio State finished in the year-end top ten of the AP Poll every season from 2005 and 2010 and were runners-up in the BCS National Championship Game after the 2006 and 2007 seasons.

On December 18, 2012, Kent State hired Haynes as its 21st head football coach. Haynes was fired after the 2017 season, finishing his tenure with a record of 14–45 overall, 9–30 in conference play. Shortly following his tenure with Kent State, Haynes was hired as defensive backs coach at Michigan State.

In February 2020, he was hired as cornerbacks coach at the Minnesota.

== Head coaching record ==
Year	Team	Overall	Conference	Standing	Bowl/playoffs
Kent State Golden Flashes (Mid-American Conference) (2013–2017)
2013	Kent State	4–8	3–5	5th (East)	
2014	Kent State	2–9	1–6	7th (East)	
2015	Kent State	3–9	2–6	T–5th (East)	
2016	Kent State	3–9	2–6	5th (East)	
2017	Kent State	2–10	1–7	6th (East)	
Kent State:		14–45	9–30		
Total:		14–45			
