= 2017 Northern Illinois Huskies football team =

American college football season

2017 Northern Illinois Huskies football

Quick Lane Bowl, L 14–36 vs. Duke
- Conference: Mid-American Conference
- West Division
- Record: 8–5 (6–2 MAC)
- Head coach: Rod Carey (5th season)
- Offensive coordinator: Mike Uremovich (2nd season)
- Offensive scheme: Multiple
- Defensive coordinator: Kevin Kane (2nd season)
- Base defense: 3–4
- MVP: Sutton Smith
- Captains: Max Scharping; Mycial Allen; Christian Blake; Shane Wimann; Jackson Abresch
- Home stadium: Huskie Stadium

2017 Mid-American Conference football standings
	Conf.			Overall
Team	W		L	W		L
East Division
Akron xy	6	–	2	7	–	7
Ohio	5	–	3	9	–	4
Miami (OH)	4	–	4	5	–	7
Buffalo	4	–	4	6	–	6
Bowling Green	2	–	6	2	–	10
Kent State	1	–	7	2	–	10
West Division
Toledo xy$	7	–	1	11	–	3
Central Michigan	6	–	2	8	–	5
Northern Illinois	6	–	2	8	–	5
Western Michigan	4	–	4	6	–	6
Eastern Michigan	3	–	5	5	–	7
Ball State	0	–	8	2	–	10
Championship: Toledo 45, Akron 28
$ – Conference champion; x – Division champion/co-champions; y – Championship game participant

The 2017 Northern Illinois Huskies football team represented Northern Illinois University as a member of the West Division of the Mid-American Conference (MAC) during the 2017 NCAA Division I FBS football season. Led by fifth-year head coach Rod Carey, the Huskies compiled an overall record of 8–5 with a mark of 6–2 in conference play, tying for second place in the MAC's West Division. Northern Illinois received an invitation to the Quick Lane Bowl, their 11th bowl game in the 14 seasons. There they lost to Duke, 36–14. The team played home games at Huskie Stadium in DeKalb, Illinois.

== Preseason ==
For the third consecutive year, the Huskies were picked to finish in third place in the MAC's West division.

== Schedule ==
Date	Time	Opponent	Site	TV	Result	Attendance
September 1	8:30 p.m.	Boston College*	Huskie Stadium; DeKalb, IL	CBSSN	L 20–23	16,421
September 9	2:30 p.m.	Eastern Illinois*	Huskie Stadium; DeKalb, IL	ESPN3	W 38–10	16,722
September 16	11:00 a.m.	at Nebraska*	Memorial Stadium; Lincoln, NE	FS1	W 21–17	89,664
September 30	9:30 p.m.	at No. 19 San Diego State*	SDCCU Stadium; San Diego, CA	CBSSN	L 28–34	35,717
October 7	3:30 p.m.	Kent State^{†}	Huskie Stadium; DeKalb, IL	ESPN3	W 24–3	11,398
October 14	3:30 p.m.	at Buffalo	University at Buffalo Stadium; Amherst, NY	ESPN3	W 14–13	12,784
October 21	1:00 p.m.	at Bowling Green	Doyt Perry Stadium; Bowling Green, OH	ESPN3	W 48–17	12,092
October 26	6:00 p.m.	Eastern Michigan	Huskie Stadium; DeKalb, IL	CBSSN	W 30–27 ^{OT}	8,872
November 2	5:00 p.m.	at Toledo	Glass Bowl; Toledo, OH	ESPNU	L 17–27	17,084
November 9	6:00 p.m.	Ball State	Huskie Stadium; DeKalb, IL (Bronze Stalk Trophy)	CBSSN	W 63–17	6,603
November 15	6:00 p.m.	Western Michigan	Huskie Stadium; DeKalb, IL	ESPN2	W 35–31	7,732
November 24	11:00 a.m.	at Central Michigan	Kelly/Shorts Stadium; Mount Pleasant, MI	CBSSN	L 24–31	8,744
December 26	5:15 p.m.	vs. Duke*	Ford Field; Detroit, MI (Quick Lane Bowl)	ESPN	L 14–36	20,211
*Non-conference game; ^{†}Homecoming; Rankings from AP Poll released prior to the game; All times are in Central time

== Game summaries ==
=== Boston College ===
Boston College at Northern Illinois

Team	1	2	3	4	Total
• Boston College	3	10	7	3	23
Northern Illinois	3	7	7	3	20

- Date: September 1, 2017
- Location:
  Brigham Field at Huskie Stadium
  DeKalb, IL
- Game start: 8:32 pm
- Elapsed time: 3:28
- Game attendance: 16,421
- Game weather: 56 °F (13 °C), Wind: 6 MPH NE, Clear
- Referee: Jeff Maconaghy
- TV announcers (ESPNU): Clay Matvick (play-by-play), Kirk Morrison (analyst)

Scoring summary
Q1	07:00	NIU	Christian Hagan 32-yard field goal	3–0 NIU
Q1	00:09	BC	C. Lichtenberg 42-yard field goal	3–3 TIE
Q2	14:56	NIU	D.J. Brown 15-yard pass from Ryan Graham (Christian Hagan kick)	10–3 NIU
Q2	02:05	BC	C. Lichtenberg 35-yard field goal	10–6 NIU
Q2	00:30	BC	M. Walker 5-yard pass from A. Brown (C. Lichtenberg kick)	13–10 BC
Q3	07:48	BC	R. Martern 4-yard pass from A. Brown (C. Lichtenberg kick)	20–10 BC
Q3	02:15	NIU	Shane Wimann 7-yard pass from Ryan Graham (Christian Hagan kick)	20–17 BC
Q4	14:25	NIU	Christian Hagan 21-yard field goal	20–20 TIE
Q4	2:13	BC	C. Lichtenberg 37-yard field goal	23–20 BC

Series Record	Previous meeting	Result
9–11	Nov 1, 2016	NIU, 45–20

The Huskies opened the season on September 1 at home against Boston College at Huskie Stadium. Northern Illinois took the early lead on a Christian Hagan 32-yard field goal in the first quarter. However, the Eagles responded with their own field goal shortly before the end of the first quarter to tie the game at three. Following a 60-yard run by NIU quarterback Ryan Graham, Graham hit D.J. Brown on a 15-yard pass for the first touchdown of the game and put the Huskies up 10–3. BC kicked their second field goal of the game a few possessions later to cut the NIU lead to 10–6. Following a quick three-and-out possession for the Huskies, the Eagles moved down the field and converted on a five-yard touchdown pass with 30 seconds left in the half. The TD gave the Eagles the 13–10 edge at halftime. Boston College extended their lead on their second possession of the second half, scoring on a four-yard touchdown pass to move the score to 20–10. The Huskies responded on a 13 play, 75-yard drive that ended with a Graham touchdown pass to Shane Wimann from seven yards out to narrow the lead to 20–10. The Huskie defense forced the Eagles to punt on the following possession and the Huskie offense tied the score with a 21-yard field goal early in the fourth quarter. Neither offense could muster anything further until BC took over with a little over seven minutes remaining in regulation. The Eagles moved into field goal position with a 13 play, 46-yard drive and hit a 37-yard field goal to give them the lead with 2:13 seconds remaining. NIU moved the ball quickly downfield as time was running out, but the drive stalled at the BC 22-yard line. On fourth down, Christian Hagan attempted a 39-yard game-tying field goal that hit the cross bar and fell short with 21 seconds remaining. BC ran out the clock to win the game 23–20. The loss moved the Huskies to 0–1 on the season.

=== Eastern Illinois ===
Eastern Illinois at Northern Illinois

Team	1	2	3	4	Total
Eastern Illinois	3	0	0	7	10
• Northern Illinois	7	24	7	0	38

- Date: September 9, 2017
- Location:
  Brigham Field at Huskie Stadium
  DeKalb, IL
- Game start: 2:30 pm
- Elapsed time: 3:32
- Game attendance: 16,722
- Game weather: 72 °F (22 °C), Wind: 10 MPH ESE, Clear
- Referee: David Siegle
- Television network: ESPN3

Scoring summary
Q1	07:57	NIU	Spencer Tears 39-yard pass from Daniel Santacaterina (Christian Hagan kick)	7–0 NIU
Q1	02:51	EIU	Nick Wilson 30-yard field goal	7–3 NIU
Q2	14:51	NIU	Marcus Jones 4-yard run (Christian Hagan kick)	14–3 NIU
Q2	05:11	NIU	Christian Blake 18-yard pass from Daniel Santacaterina (Christian Hagan kick)	21–3 NIU
Q2	03:05	NIU	Marcus Jones 1-yard run (Christian Hagan kick)	28–3 NIU
Q2	00:52	NIU	Christian Hagan 20-yard field goal)	31–3 NIU
Q3	01:34	NIU	CShae Wimann 1-yard pass from Daniel Santacaterina (Christian Hagan kick)	38–3 NIU
Q4	08:01	NIU	Scotty Gilkey 1-yard run (Nick Wilson kick)	38–10 NIU

Series Record	Previous meeting	Result
26–10–1	Sep 21, 2014	NIU, 43–39

Looking to rebound from their opening season loss, the Huskies welcomed FCS Eastern Illinois to Huskie Stadium for their second straight home game. Starting NIU quarterback Ryan Graham missed the game with a shoulder injury and was expected to miss a few more games. The Huskies jumped to an early 7–0 lead on backup QB Daniel Santacaterina's pass to Spencer Tears from 29 yards out. Eastern answered with a field goal to cut the lead to 7–3. The Huskie defense intercepted the Panthers on their next possession and scored on a Marcus Jones four-yard run to increase the lead to 14–3 early in the second quarter. Following a missed field goal, the Huskies scored another touchdown on a 19-yard pass from Santacaterina to Christian Blake. The Huskies added another touchdown, following another NIU interception, on another Marcus Jones run, this one from one yard out to take a 28–3 lead as the rout was on. The Huskies added a field goal with 52 seconds remaining to push the rout to 31–7 at the half. The Huskies added another with 1:34 remaining in the third quarter as Santacaterina hit Shane Wimann for a one-yard score. With the Huskies up 38–3 in the fourth quarter, the Panthers finally scored a touchdown on Scotty Gilkey one-yard touchdown run. The 38–10 win moved the Huskies to 1–1 on the season. The NIU defense played well, allowing 60 yards rushing and 187 yards overall. The NIU offense put up 230 yards passing and 269 yard rushing in the easy win over the Panthers.

=== At Nebraska ===
Northern Illinois at Nebraska

Team	1	2	3	4	Total
• Northern Illinois	14	0	0	7	21
Nebraska	0	0	10	7	17

- Date: September 16, 2017
- Location:
  Memorial Stadium
  Lincoln, NE
- Game start: 11:05 am
- Elapsed time: 3:15
- Game attendance: 89,664
- Game weather: 74 °F (23 °C), Wind: 8 MPH SSE, Overcast
- Referee: Ron Hudson
- TV announcers (FS1): Tim Brando (play-by-play), Spencer Tillman (analyst), Les Miles (analyst), Holly Sonders (sideline)

Scoring summary
Q1	11:24	NIU	Shawen Lurry 87-yard interception return (Christian Hagan kick)	7–0 NIU
Q1	01:13	NIU	Jawuan Johnson 25-yard interception return (Christian Hagan kick)	14–0 NIU
Q3	08:05	NEB	Tanner Lee 4-yard run (Drew Brown kick)	14–7 NIU
Q3	00:45	NEB	Drew Brown 36-yard field goal	14–10 NIU
Q4	11:14	NEB	Tanner Lee 1-yard run (Drew Brown kick)	17–14 NEB
Q4	08:52	NIU	Jordan Huff 2-yard run (Christian Hagan kick)	21–17 NIU

Series Record	Previous meeting	Result
0–2	Sep 8, 1990	Neb, 60–14

In their first road game of the season, the Huskies traveled to Lincoln, Nebraska to take on the Cornhuskers. Nebraska got the ball first and moved down the field to reach the NIU 13-yard line. Looking to take the early lead, Husker quarterback Tanner Lee threw the ball to the right, but Huskie defensive back read the play beautifully and picked off the pass, returning it 87 yards to give the Huskies an early 7–0 lead. After each team punted on their next two possessions, Lee was intercepted again, this time by Jawuan Johnson who returned the pick 25 yards for a touchdown and a 14–0 lead. The NIU defense further held the Huskers in check in the first half, holding Nebraska scoreless as they missed a field goal to end the half giving NIU the 14–0 lead at halftime.

In the second half, neither team was able to manage anything on their first two possessions, but Nebraska was finally able to put points on the board after forcing NIU returner Jalen Embry to fumble a punt which the Huskers recovered. Two plays later, Lee scored for Nebraska, cutting the lead to 14–7. NIU was forced punt on their ensuing possession and the Huskers converted a 36-yard field goal with 15 seconds remaining in the third quarter. NIU's offense again managed nothing and was forced to punt. The Huskers went 63 yards on their next possession before Lee scored on a one-yard run as the Huskie dream story appeared to be over with Nebraska taking the lead 17–14. However, NIU answered on their next possession, going 75 yards in six plays before Jordan Huff scored from two yards out to retake the lead 21–17. Nebraska's next possession ended on fourth down as Mycial Allen broke up a fourth down pass from Lee. Following yet another NIU punt, Josh Corcoran intercepted Lee yet again in Nebraska territory and the Huskies were able to run out the clock clinching the 21–17 win. The win moved the Huskies to 2–1 on the season.

The NIU offense only mustered 213 yards in the game, but forced three key Nebraska turnovers. Jordan Huff rushed for 105 yards and a touchdown as the NIU defense held the Cornhuskers to 384 yards of offense.

The Huskies became the first team not in a Power 5 conference or major independent to win in Lincoln since Southern Miss knocked off the Cornhuskers in 2004. Northern Illinois moved to 4–1 against Big Ten teams under fifth-year coach Rod Carey.

=== At San Diego State ===
Northern Illinois at San Diego State

Team	1	2	3	4	Total
Northern Illinois	14	0	14	0	28
• No. 19 San Diego State	14	17	0	3	34

- Date: September 30, 2017
- Location:
  SDCCU Stadium
  San Diego, CA
- Game start: 9:38 pm CDT
- Elapsed time: 3:25
- Game attendance: 35,717
- Game weather: 65 °F (18 °C), Wind: 1 MPH SSE, Mostly cloudy
- Referee: Ron Hudson
- TV announcers (CBSSN): Dave Ryan (play-by-play), Corey Chavous (analyst)

Scoring summary
Q1	14:47	SDSU	J. Washington 96-yard kickoff return (John Baron kick)	7–0 SDSU
Q1	11:49	NIU	Christian Blake 64-yard pass from Daniel Santacaterina (Christian Hagan kick)	7–7 TIE
Q1	09:55	SDSU	Rashaad Penny 33-yard pass from C. Chapman (John Barron kick)	14–7 SDSU
Q1	4:18	NIU	Christian Blake 10-yard pass from Daniel Santacaterina (Christian Hagan kick)	14–14 TIE
Q2	9:00	SDSU	Tariq Thompson 83-yard interception return (John Barron kick)	21–14 SDSU
Q2	2:12	SDSU	Kahale Warring 8-yard pass from C. Chapman (John Barron kick)	28–14 SDSU
Q2	0:07	SDSU	John Barron 38-yard field goal	31–14 SDSU
Q3	14:17	NIU	Spencer Tears 81-yard pass from Daniel Santacaterina (Christian Hagan kick)	31–21 SDSU
Q4	5:39	NIU	Marcus Childers 1-yard run (Christian Hagan kick)	31–28 SDSU
Q4	14:15	SDSU	John Barron 21-yard field goal	34–28 SDSU

Series Record	Previous meeting	Result
0–3	Sep 17, 2016	SDSU, 42–28

In their second straight road game, NIU traveled to the West Coast to face the Aztecs in San Diego, California. The game did not start well for the Huskies as the Aztecs returned the opening kick for a touchdown to put NIU in an early hole 7–0. NIU answered on their first possession as Daniel Santacaterina hit Christian Blake for a 34-yard touchdown to tie the game. Special teams would let the Huskies down as the Huskies fumbled on the ensuing punt by the Aztecs which set them up at the NIU 33 for 33-yard touchdown run as SDSU regained the lead 14–7. Santacaterina answered again for the Huskies, hitting Christian Blake for 10-yard touchdown pass. However, in the second quarter, Santacaterina would make a mistake throwing a pick-six to SDSU's Tariq Thompson which again gave the Aztecs the lead at 21–14. The Aztecs would add another touchdown via a touchdown pass and a field goal near the end of the first half to take a commanding 31–14 lead.

NIU, however, was not ready to give in. Santacaterina hit Spencer Tears on an 81-yard touchdown pass on the second play of the third quarter to bring the Huskies within 10 at 31–21. Following a 50-yard pass to set up the Huskies at the Aztec 10, Marcus Childers ran the ball in to close the lead to 31–28. A SDSU field goal in the first minute of the fourth quarter pushed the lead to six as the Huskies looked to defeat the No. 19-ranked Aztecs. The NIU offense could not garner another point as they turned the ball over on three of their last four possession (two interceptions and one turnover on downs) as the Huskies fell 34–28.

The loss dropped the Huskies to 2–2 on the season as they got read for MAC play.

=== Kent State ===
Kent State at Northern Illinois

Team	1	2	3	4	Total
Kent State	0	3	0	0	3
• Northern Illinois	7	7	10	0	24

- Date: October 7, 2017
- Location:
  Brigham Field at Huskie Stadium
  DeKalb, IL
- Game start: 2:30 pm
- Elapsed time: 3:00
- Game attendance: 11,398
- Game weather: 63 °F (17 °C), Wind: 23 MPH SS2, Rain
- Referee: Amanda Sauer
- TV announcers (ESPN3): Dan Gutowsky (play-by-play), Marcus Ray (analyst)

Scoring summary
Q1	2:00	NIU	Spencer Tears 10-yard pass from Marcus Childers (Christian Hagan kick)	7–0 NIU
Q2	6:33	KSU	Shane Hynes 18-yard field goal	7–3 NIU
Q2	1:01	NIU	Shane Wimann 25-yard pass from Marcus Childers (Christian Hagan kick)	14–3 NIU
Q3	10:34	NIU	Jordan Huff 2-yard pass from Marcus Childers (Christian Hagan kick)	21–3 NIU
Q3	4:48	NIU	Christian Hagan 41-yard field goal	24–3 NIU

Series Record	Previous meeting	Result
20–3	Nov 25, 2016	NIU, 31–21

NIU returned home to open MAC play against the Golden Flashes at Huskie Stadium. The game also marked Homecoming for the Huskies. Starting quarterback Daniel Santacaterina was ineffective early for the Huskies and was replaced by Marcus Childers in the first quarter. Childers threw three touchdown passes for the Huskies, two in the first half to give NIU a 14–3 lead at halftime. The NIU defense held the Flashes to 131 total yards as the majority of the game was played in a rain storm. Shawun Lurry, Jawuan Johnson, and Bobby Jones IV intercepted passes in the game for the Huskies as they forced four Kent State turnovers.

Childers threw for 114 yards while rushing for 65 in the easy 24–3 win over Kent State. The win was NIU's 21st in the last 22 games against MAC Eastern Division teams. The win moved the Huskies to 3–2 on the season and 1–0 in MAC play.

=== At Buffalo ===
Northern Illinois at Buffalo

Team	1	2	3	4	Total
• Northern Illinois	0	14	0	0	14
Buffalo	3	10	0	0	13

- Date: October 14, 2017
- Location:
  UB Stadium
  Buffalo, NY
- Game start: 3:35 pm
- Elapsed time: 3:06
- Game attendance: 12,784
- Game weather: 68 °F (20 °C), Wind: 8 MPH W, Cloudy
- Referee: Tom Stapleton
- TV announcers (ESPN3): Doug Sherman (play-by-play), Dustin Fox (analyst)

Scoring summary
Q1	2:47	BUF	Adam Mitcheson 23-yard field goal	3–0 BUF
Q2	14:00	NIU	Marcus Childers 10-yard run (Christian Hagan Kick)	7–3 NIU
Q2	10:09	NIU	Shae Wimann 34-yard pass from Marcus Childers (Christian Hagan kick)	14–3 NIU
Q2	8:14	BUF	Emmanuel Reed 21-yard pass from Drew Anderson (Adam Mitcheson kick)	14–10 NIU
Q2	2:51	BUF	Adam Mitcheson 22-yard field goal	14–13 NIU

Series Record	Previous meeting	Result
10–1	Oct 22, 2016	NIU, 44–7

In their first road MAC game, NIU traveled to face Buffalo. Marcus Childers kept up his strong play at quarterback for the Huskies as he passed for 224 yards and ran for 79 in first career start. Childers ran for one touchdown and threw for another to give NIU a 14–3 lead early in the second quarter. Buffalo drew within one point at 14–13 before the half ended. In the second half, neither team could score any points as both defenses stepped up. NIU did miss two field goals in the half as Buffalo also missed one. With less than 10 minutes remaining in the game, Buffalo moved to midfield, but had their ensuing pass intercepted by Jawuan Johnson. An NIU field goal attempt was no good and the Bulls were forced to punt with just over four minutes remaining in the game. The NIU offense took over and was able to run out the clock, giving the Huskies a 14–13 win. The win moved NIU to 4–2 on the season and 2–0 in MAC play.

=== At Bowling Green ===
Northern Illinois at Bowling Green

Team	1	2	3	4	Total
• Northern Illinois	14	17	10	7	48
Bowling Green	7	0	3	7	17

- Date: October 21, 2017
- Location:
  Doyt Perry Stadium
  Bowling Green, OH
- Game start: 2:00 pm
- Elapsed time: 3:18
- Game attendance: 12,092
- Game weather: 75 °F (24 °C), Wind: 10 MPH S, Mostly cloudy
- Referee: Tim O'Dey
- Television network: ESPN3

Scoring summary
Q1	11:47	NIU	Tommy Mister 30-yard run (Christian Hagan kick)	7–0 NIU
Q1	3:33	NIU	Shane Wimann 8-yard pass from Marcus Childers (Christian Hagan kick)	14–0 NIU
Q1	0:38	BGSU	Quintin Morris 11-yard pass from James Mortan (Jake Sudern kick)	14–7 NIU
Q2	7:33	NIU	Spencer Tears 15-yard pass from Marcus Childers (Christian Hagan kick)	21–7 NIU
Q2	2:19	NIU	Chad Beebe 73-yard pass from Marcus Childers (Christian Hagan kick)	28–7 NIU
Q2	0:00	NIU	Christian Hagan 29-yard field goal	31–7 NIU
Q3	11:55	NIU	Sutton Smith 16-yard fumble recovery (Christian Hagan kick)	38–7 NIU
Q3	7:33	NIU	Christian Hagan 32-yard field goal	41–7 NIU
Q3	2:04	BGSU	Jake Suder 34-yard field goal	41–10 NIU
Q4	4:54	BGSU	Grany Loy 2-yard run (Jake Suder kick)	41–17 NIU
Q4	0:50	NIU	Jauan Wesley 9-yard run (Christian Hagan kick)	48–17 NIU

Series Record	Previous meeting	Result
9–11	Nov 1, 2016	NIU, 45–20

The Huskies again went on the road, this time to Ohio to face Bowling Green in their third MAC game of the season. Marcus Childers, making his second consecutive start at quarterback for the Huskies, again performed well. He threw for 239 yards and three touchdowns and added 73 yards on the ground as NIU jumped up early on Bowling Green. However, BGSU kept the game close as the first quarter ended with the NIU leading 14–7. The Huskies blew the game open in the second quarter. Two touchdown passes from Childers, including a 73-yard catch by Chad Beebe, son of former NFL wide receiver Don Beebe, put NIU up 31–7 at the half. A 16-yard fumble recovery for a touchdown by Sutton Smith early in the third quarter followed by Christian Hagan's second field goal of the game moved the lead to 41–7 with just over six minutes remaining in the third quarter. BGSU added 10 points to pull within 41–17 with just under five minutes remaining in the game, but Jauan Wesley scored from nine yards out with 50 seconds left in the game to give the Huskies a 48–17 blowout win. NIU running back Tommy Mister carried the ball 17 times for 115 yards and a touchdown in the game. Beebe added six catches for 124 yards in the big game of the NIU offense. The win moved NIU to 5–2 on the season and 3–0 in MAC play.

=== Eastern Michigan ===
Eastern Michigan at Northern Illinois

Team	1	2	3	4	OT	Total
Eastern Michigan	0	14	3	7	3	27
• Northern Illinois	0	7	3	14	6	30

- Date: October 26, 2017
- Location:
  Brigham Field at Huskie Stadium
  DeKalb, IL
- Game start: 6:00 pm
- Elapsed time: 3:50
- Game attendance: 8,872
- Game weather: 53 °F (12 °C), Wind: 10 MPH S, Clear
- Referee: Greg Sujack
- Television network: CBSSN

Scoring summary
Q2	12:52	NIU	D.J. Brown 69-yard pass from Marcus Childers (Christian Hagan kick)	7–0 NIU
Q2	12:37	EMU	Sergio Bailey 68-yard pass from Brogan Roback (Paulie Fricano kick)	7–7 TIE
Q2	4:39	EMU	Jaron Johnson 0-yard punt return following punt block (Paulie Fricano kick)	14–7 EMU
Q3	11:14	NIU	Christian Hagan 25-yard field goal	14–10 EMU
Q3	5:49	EMU	Paulie Fricano 34-yard field goal	17–10 EMU
Q4	13:31	EMU	Bryce Kemp 45-yard pass from Isaac Holder (Paulie Fricano kick)	24–10 EMU
Q4	7:31	NIU	Shane Wimann 5-yard pass from Marcus Childers (Christian Hagan kick)	24–17 EMU
Q4	2:57	NIU	Marcus Childers 10-yard run (Christian Hagan kick)	24–24 TIE
OT		EMU	Paulie Fricano 35-yard field goal	27–24 EMU
OT		NIU	Marcus Jones 9-yard run	30–27 NIU

Series Record	Previous meeting	Result
23–5–2	Nov 16, 2016	NIU, 24–7

For their first Thursday night game of the season, the Huskies welcomed Eastern Michigan to Huskie Stadium. Neither team was able to score any points in the first quarter, however on their first possession of the second quarter, NIU took the lead as Marcus Childer hit D.J. Brown on a 69-yard touchdown pass. Eastern Michigan answered the touchdown on their next play as Sergio Bailey caught a 68-yard touchdown pass from Brogan Roback to the game at seven. Both teams punted on their next possessions and the NIU offense again sputtered. However, the ensuing NIU punt was blocked into the end zone and recovered by EMU to give the Eagles a 14–7 lead at the half.

In the second half, NIU's offense drove deep into EMU territory, but was forced to settle for a Christian Hagan 25-yard field goal to narrow the lead to 14–10. After a missed EMU field goal, Christian Blake fumbled, giving EMU the ball in NIU territory. The NIU defense held the Eagles to another field goal attempt, this time good, to return the Eagle lead to seven at 17–10. Neither team's offense could manage anything further in the third quarter, but after a bad punt set EMU up at the NIU 45-yard line early in the fourth quarter, the Eagles extend the lead on an Isaac Holder 45-yard touchdown pass. Trailing by 14, to the two-win Eagles, NIU's Marcus Childers hit Shane Wimann for a five-yard touchdown pass to close the lead to seven. After punts by both sides, NIU blocked an EMU punt to set up the Huskie offense at the Eagle 10 yard line with just over three minutes left in the game. Two plays later, Childers scored from 10 yard out to tie the game at 24. With time running out, EMU drove into Huskie territory, but missed a 42-yard field as time expired to force overtime.

In overtime, EMU settled for a field goal to go ahead 27–24. NIU would need only two plays to score as Marcus Jones ran the ball in from nine yards out to give the Huskies the 30–24 win. The win, the sixth on the season for the Huskies, made NIU bowl-eligible for the ninth time in the previous 10 years. MSU remained tied atop the West Division of the MAC at 4–0 in conference and 6–2 overall.

=== At Toledo ===
Northern Illinois at Toledo

Team	1	2	3	4	Total
Northern Illinois	7	0	7	3	17
• Toledo	7	3	14	3	27

- Date: November 2, 2017
- Location:
  Glass Bowl
  Toledo, OH
- Game start: 5:02 pm CDT
- Elapsed time: 3:29
- Game attendance: 17,084
- Game weather: 64 °F (18 °C), Wind: 6 MPH SW, Cloudy
- Referee: Tom Stapleton
- TV announcers (ESPNU): Mike Couzens (play-by-play), Tom Luginbill (analyst)

Scoring summary
Q1	12:07	TOL	Terry Swanson 4-yard run (Jameson Vest kick)	7–0 TOL
Q1	2:39	NIU	Tre Harbison 1-yard run (Christian Hagan kick)	7–7 TIE
Q2	1:04	TOL	Jameson Vest 23-yard field goal	10–7 TOL
Q3	13:23	NIU	Marcus Childers 1-yard run (Christian Hagan kick)	14–10 NIU
Q3	8:55	TOL	Terry Swason 13-yard run (Jameson Vest kick)	17–14 TOL
Q3	4:02	TOL	Terry Swason 1-yard run (Jameson Vest kick)	24–14 TOL
Q4	1:04	TOL	Christian Hagan 25-yard field goal	24–17 TOL
Q4	8:48	TOL	Jameson Vest 34-yard field goal	27–17 TOL

Series Record	Previous meeting	Result
14–29	Nov 9, 2016	Tol, 31–24

Northern Illinois traveled to Toledo to take on the Rockets with first place in the West Division on the line. The Rockets took an early lead on their first possession as Terry Swanson scored from four yards out to give the Rockets a 7–0 lead. NIU answered late in the first quarter as Tre Harbison scored from one yard out to tie the game. Toledo added a field goal near the end of the first half to take a 10–7 lead at half time.

The Huskies took the lead on their first drive in the second half as Marcus Childers ran the ball in from one yard out to give the Huskes their only lead of the game 14–10. Toledo quickly answered, scoring on their next possession to retake the lead, 17–14. Another touchdown by Terry Swanson, his third of the game gave Toledo a 24–14 lead heading into the fourth quarter. Following a blocked punt deep in Toledo territory, the Huskie offense could not score and was forced to settled for a 25-yard field goal from Christian Hagan to narrow the lead to 24–17. The Rockets quickly answered with a 35-yard field goal to return the lead to 10 with just under nine minutes remaining in the game. Marcus Childers was intercepted on the next Huskie possession while in Rocket territory and the Huskies missed a 47-yard field goal with 3:46 remaining in the game. Neither team could manage anything further as the Rockets pulled out the 27–17 win. The loss moved NIU to 6–3 on the season and 4–1 in MAC play.

=== Ball State ===
Ball State at Northern Illinois

Team	1	2	3	4	Total
Ball State	7	0	10	0	17
• Northern Illinois	21	14	14	14	63

- Date: November 9, 2017
- Location:
  Brigham Field at Huskie Stadium
  DeKalb, IL
- Game attendance: 6,603
- Game weather: 30 °F (−1 °C), Wind: 8 MPH NNW, Clear
- Referee: Amanda Sauer
- TV announcers (CBSSN): Jason Horowitz, Aaron Murray

Scoring summary
Q1	8:53	NIU	Shane Wimann 4-yard pass from Marcus Childers (Christian Hagan kick)	7–0 NIU
Q1	5:57	BSU	Riley Miller 23-yard pass from Drew Plitt (Morgan Hagee kick)	7–7 TIE
Q1	2:51	NIU	Jordan Huff 24-yard pass from Marcus Childers (Christian Hagan kick)	14–7 NIU
Q1	0:35	NIU	Jackson Abresch 13-yard punt return (Christian Hagan kick)	21–7 NIU
Q2	10:51	NIU	D.J. Brown 6-yard run (Christian Hagan kick)	28–7 NIU
Q2	8:02	NIU	Mitch Brinkman 5-yard pass from Marcus Childers (Christian Hagan kick)	35–7 NIU
Q3	8:53	BSU	Malik Dunner 4-yard run (Morgan Hagee kick)	35–14 NIU
Q3	5:20	NIU	Christian Blake 19-yard pass from Marcus Childers (Christian Hagan kick)	42–14 NIU
Q3	4:40	NIU	Jordan Huff 35-yard run (Christian Hagan kick)	49–14 NIU
Q3	0:18	BSU	Morgan Hagee 21-yard field goal	49–17 NIU
Q4	9:52	NIU	Jauan Wesley 70-yard pass from Daniel Santacaterina (Christian Hagan kick)	56–17 NIU
Q4	4:18	NIU	Jackson Abresch 0-yard punt return (Christian Hagan kick)	63–17 NIU

Series Record	Previous meeting	Result
16–18	Oct 1, 2016	NIU, 31–24

In the battle for the Bronze Stalk Trophy, the Cardinals of Ball State visited the Huskies in NIU's third straight Thursday night game. NIU blew out Ball State easily 63–17. NIU scored three times in the first quarter to take a 21–7 lead and added two more touchdowns in the second quarter including a return of a blocked punt to take 35–7 halftime lead. QB Marcus Childers threw three touchdown passes in the first half and would add another in the third quarter as NIU's lead grew to 49–14. Another blocked punt sealed the scoring as NIU cruised to a 46-point win. The Huskies rushed for 222 yards while no one rusher gained more than 57 yards against the beleaguered Ball State defense. Former starting QB, Daniel Santacataerina, in mop-up duty, threw a 70-yard touchdown pass, his only completion on the night. NIU out-gained the Cardinals 433–255 in the win. LB Sutton Smith, who came in leading the FBS with 20 tackles for losses on the season, had two in the game to set the Northern Illinois single-season record as NIU finished the game with 18 tackles for loss, the most in FBS to this point in the season. The win moved the Huskies to 7–3 on the season and 5–1 in MAC play.

=== Western Michigan ===
Western Michigan at Northern Illinois

Team	1	2	3	4	Total
Western Michigan	7	7	14	3	31
• Northern Illinois	14	7	0	14	35

- Date: November 14, 2017
- Location:
  Brigham Field at Huskie Stadium
  DeKalb, IL
- Game start: 6:00 pm
- Elapsed time: 3:25
- Game attendance: 7,732
- Game weather: 45 °F (7 °C), Wind: 13 MPH W, Clear
- Referee: Tim O'Dey
- TV announcers (ESPN2): Chris Cotter, Desmond Howard

Scoring summary
Q1	12:41	NIU	Jordan Huff 31-yard run (Christian Hagan kick)	7–0 NIU
Q1	4:18	WMU	Keishaw Watson 7-yard pass from Reece Goddard (Josh Grant kick)	7–7 TIE
Q1	2:34	NIU	Marcus Childers 1-yard run (Christian Hagan kick)	14–7 NIU
Q2	12:04	WMU	Jarvis Franklin 2-yard run (Josh Grant kick)	14–14 TIE
Q2	6:22	NIU	Sutton Smith 58-yard fumble return (Christian Hagan kick)	21–14 NIU
Q3	3:06	WMU	Reece Goddard 7-yard run (Josh Grant kick)	21–21 TIE
Q3	1:36	WMU	Don Ernsberger 13-yard pass from Reece Goddard (Josh Grant kick)	28–21 WMU
Q4	14:04	NIU	Jordan Huff 14-yard run (Christian Hagan kick)	28–28 TIE
Q4	10:37	WMU	Josh Grant 28-yard field goal	31–28 WMU
Q4	6:20	NIU	Mitch Brinkman 26-yard pass from Marcus Childers(Christian Hagan kick)	35–31 NIU

Series Record	Previous meeting	Result
18–23	Oct 8, 2016	WMU, 45–30

On Senior Day at Huskie Stadium, NIU welcomed defending MAC champion Western Michigan to DeKalb. The winds played a factor at Huskie Stadium and, after being forced to punt on their first possession, the Broncos managed only a 22-yard punt giving NIU the ball at the WMU 31 yard line. On the first play from scrimmage, Jordan Huff scored on a 31-yard run to give NIU the early 7–0 lead. After exchanging punts, WMU tied the game on a seven-yard touchdown pass. NIU answered immediately on their next possession with Marcus Childers scoring from one yard out. As the second quarter began, the Broncos tied the game again on a two-yard touchdown run. Neither team managed much on their next possession and the wind knocked down an NIU punt resulting in a seven-yard punt. WMU took over at the NIU 38, but on the first play of the drive, Bronco quarterback Reece Goddard fumbled the ball and NIU linebacker Sutton Smith picked up the fumble and returned it 58 yards for a touchdown. The half ended with NIU on top 21–14.

In the second half, after a failed long drive by the Huskies, WMU answered with their own long drive as Goddard scored on a seven-yard run to tie the game at 21. Disaster struck on NIU's next possession as Marcus Jones fumbled the ball on the first play giving WMU the ball at the NIU 24 yard line. Three plays later, the Broncos took the lead on a Goddard touchdown pass. Trailing 28–21, NIU running back Jordan Huff took over, rushing for 52 yards on the next drive including a 14-yard touchdown run to tie the game. WMU retook the lead with a field goal with a little over 10 minutes remaining in the game. NIU answered, led by Huff and Childers and moved to the WMU 26 yard line before Childers hit Mich Brinkman for a 26-yard touchdown pass to give NIU the lead 35–31. NIU forced the Broncos to punt on their next possession and with a little over five minutes left in the game successfully ran out the clock to secure the win.

Jordan Huff rushed for 190 yards on 25 attempts and scored two touchdowns. The Huskie running game totaled 272 yard on the day. The NIU defense, along with the Sutton Smith touchdown, held WMU to only 110 yards in the game. The win moved NIU to 8–3 on the season and 6–1 in MAC play with a chance to still play for the MAC Championship if Toledo lost another game.

=== Central Michigan ===
Northern Illinois at Central Michigan

Team	1	2	3	4	Total
Northern Illinois	14	3	0	7	24
• Central Michigan	0	0	17	14	31

- Date: November 24, 2017
- Location:
  Kelly/Shorts Stadium
  Mount Pleasant, MI
- Game start: 11:00 am
- Elapsed time: 3:31
- Game attendance: 8,744
- Game weather: 42 °F (6 °C), Wind: 15-20 MPH SW, Mostly Cloudy
- Referee: Greg Sujack
- TV announcers (CBSSN): Ben Holden, David Diehl

Scoring summary
Q1	14:08	NIU	Jawuan Johnson 37-yard interception return (Christian Hagan kick)	7–0 NIU
Q1	1:59	NIU	D.J. Brown 4-yard pass from Marcus Childers (Christian Hagan kick)	14–0 NIU
Q2	7:13	NIU	Christian Hagan 23-yard field goal	17–0 NIU
Q3	12:06	CMU	Mark Chapman 56-yard pass from Shane Morris (Michael Armstrong kick)	17–7 NIU
Q3	9:52	CMU	Michael Armstrong 23-yard field goal)	17–10 NIU
Q3	1:19	CMU	Jonathan Ward 4-yard pass from Shane Morris (Michael Armstrong kick)	17–17 TIE
Q4	12:35	CMU	onathan Ward 54-yard pass from Shane Morris (Michael Armstrong kick)	24–17 CMU
Q4	3:03	NIU	Tre Harbison 12-yard run (Christian Hagan kick)	24–24 TIE
Q4	1:32	NIU	Corey Willis 29-yard pass from Shane Armstrong (Michael Armstrong kick)	31–24 CMU

Series Record	Previous meeting	Result
15–16	Oct 15, 2016	CMU, 34–28

In the final regular season game of the season, the Huskies traveled to face Central Michigan. Things started well for the Huskies as Shane Morris intercepted CMU's Tyler Conklin on the third play of the game and returned it 37 yards for a touchdown and a 7–0 lead. With just under two minutes remaining in the first quarter, Marcus Childers hit D.J. Brown from four yards out to increase the lead to 14–0. A second quarter field goal gave the Huskies a 17–0 lead as they appeared to be on their way to a relatively easy win. However, Central Michigan roared out of the half to score the next 24 points to take a 24–17 lead into the fourth quarter. With just over three minutes remaining in the game, NIU notched the tie with a 12-yard touchdown run by Tre Harbison, marking the first points of the half for the Huskies. However, the Chippewas immediately answered, driving 75 yards on five plays and scoring on a 29-yard touchdown pass with 1:32 left to retake the lead. NIU, with a chance to tie, quickly moved the ball down the field with time running out, but Marcus Childers was intercepted at the CMU goalline with 1:10 remaining. The Chippewas were able to run the clock out to secure the 31–24 win. The loss ended the Huskie regular season with an 8–4 overall record and 6–2 in conference play.

=== Quick Lane Bowl ===
Duke vs. Northern Illniois

Team	1	2	3	4	Total
• Duke	14	12	7	3	36
Northern Illinois	0	14	0	0	14

- Date: December 26, 2017
- Location:
  Ford Field
  Detroit, MI
- Game start: 5:19 pm
- Elapsed time: 3:18
- Game attendance: 20,211
- Game weather: Indoors
- Referee: James Carter
- TV announcers (ESPN): Mike Couzens, Ray Bentley

Scoring summary
Q1	6:00	DUKE	D Jones 1 yard run (W Holmquist kick)	7–0 DUKE
Q1	3:17	DUKE	S Wilson 1 yard run (W Holmquist kick)	14–0 DUKE
Q2	14:21	NIU	Tre Harbison 25 yard run (Christian Hagan kick)	14–7 DUKE
Q2	12:22	NIU	Jauan Wesley 67 yard pass from Marcus Childers (Christian Hagan kick)	14–14 TIE
Q2	6:09	DUKE	TJ Rahming 33 yard pass from D Jones (kick failed)	20–14 DUKE
Q2	1:33	DUKE	S Wilson 11 yard pass from D Jones (pass failed)	26–14 DUKE
Q3	6:58	DUKE	B Brown 7 yard run (W Holmquist kick)	33–14 DUKE
Q4	7:37	DUKE	W Holmquist 24 yard field goal	36–14 DUKE

Series Record	Previous meeting	Result
0–0	First Meeting	N/A

Northern Illinois was invited to the Quick Lane Bowl at Ford Field in Detroit, Michigan where they faced Duke for the first time in school history on December 26, 2017. The bowl appearance marked the Huskies 11th bowl appearance in the previous 14 years.

Following punts on NIU's first two possessions, the Blue Devils took the lead on their second possession, scoring from one yard out to take go ahead 7–0. On their ensuing possession, NIU attempted from a fake punt from their own 11-yard line which failed. Duke quickly took advantage, scoring three plays later to take the 14–0 lead. NIU answered in the second as Tre Harbison rushed 25 yards for a touchdown to halve the lead. Following a Duke punt, Macus Childers hit Jauan Wesley on a 67-yard touchdown pass to tie the game. Both teams were forced to punt on their next possessions and Duke took the lead on a 33-yard touchdown pass with just over six minutes remaining in the half. The extra point failed, leaving the score 20–14. Following another NIU punt, Duke moved the lead to 26–14 following an 11-yard touchdown pass and a failed two-point conversion attempt. NIU could not muster any offense on its final possession of the half to trail 26–14 going into the third quarter.

NIU was held scoreless in the second half as Duke added a field goal and another touchdown to give the Blue Devils a 36–14 win. The NIU offense was held in check, only managing 299 yards in the game while the Blue Devils amassed 465 yards.

The loss dropped the Huskies to 8–5 on the season as their season came to an end.

== Coaching staff ==
Name	Title	Years at NIU	Alma mater
Rod Carey	Head coach	7	Indiana
Kevin Kane	Def. coord./safeties coach	6	Kansas
Mike Uremovich	Off. coord./asst. head coach/TE/fb coach	6	Purdue
Steve Crutchley	WR Coach	1	Wisconsin–Eau Claire
Brett Diersen	DL Coach	5	Huron (SD)
Jordan Lynch	QB Coach	1	Northern Illinois
Jeff Knowles	LB Coach	1	St. Francis
James Davis	RB Coach	1	Clemson
Melvin Rice	CB Coach	3	Northern Illinois
Joe Tripodi	OL Coach/Run Game Coord.	8	Northwestern

== Postseason awards ==
=== All-MAC ===
Sophomore defensive end Sutton Smith was named the Mid-American Conference Defensive Player of the Year. Smith led the nation in both sacks (14) and tackles for loss (28.5) as he started all 12 games for NIU. He set the single-season Huskie record for sacks.

Quarterback Marcus Childers was named the MAC Freshman of the Year. Childers completed 137 of 239 passes for 1,440 yards and 15 touchdowns while appearing in 11 games for the Huskies. He added 454 rushing yards and five rushing touchdowns.

Ten Huskies were named to All-MAC teams:

Team	Player	Position	Year
1st	Max Scharping	OL	JR
1st	Shane Wimann	TE	SR
1st	Sutton Smith	DL	SO
1st	Shawun Lurry	DB	SR
2nd	Bobby Jones IV	LB	SR
3rd	Jordan Steckler	OL	SO
3rd	Spencer Tears	WR	SO
3rd	Jordan Huff	RB	SR
3rd	Jawuan Johnson	LB	JR
3rd	Josh Corcoran	DL	JR
