= 2017 Kent State Golden Flashes football team =

American college football season

2017 Kent State Golden Flashes football
- Conference: Mid-American Conference
- East Division
- Record: 2–10 (1–7 MAC)
- Head coach: Paul Haynes (5th season)
- Offensive coordinator: Don Treadwell (3rd season)
- Offensive scheme: Multiple
- Co-defensive coordinators: Ben Needham (2nd season); Jeff Burrow (1st season)
- Base defense: 4–3
- Home stadium: Dix Stadium

2017 Mid-American Conference football standings
	Conf.			Overall
Team	W		L	W		L
East Division
Akron xy	6	–	2	7	–	7
Ohio	5	–	3	9	–	4
Miami (OH)	4	–	4	5	–	7
Buffalo	4	–	4	6	–	6
Bowling Green	2	–	6	2	–	10
Kent State	1	–	7	2	–	10
West Division
Toledo xy$	7	–	1	11	–	3
Central Michigan	6	–	2	8	–	5
Northern Illinois	6	–	2	8	–	5
Western Michigan	4	–	4	6	–	6
Eastern Michigan	3	–	5	5	–	7
Ball State	0	–	8	2	–	10
Championship: Toledo 45, Akron 28
$ – Conference champion; x – Division champion/co-champions; y – Championship game participant

The 2017 Kent State Golden Flashes football team represented Kent State University in the 2017 NCAA Division I FBS football season. They were led by fifth-year head coach Paul Haynes and played their home games at Dix Stadium in Kent, Ohio as members of the East Division of the Mid-American Conference. They finished the season 2–10, 1–7 in MAC play to finish in last place in the East Division.

On August 28, 2017, the school announced that head coach Paul Haynes would be taking a medical leave of absence and miss the first two to three weeks of the season. Offensive coordinator Don Treadwell was named interim head coach. Haynes returned to the Flashes after missing two games due to prostate cancer treatments.

On November 22, one day after the Flashes' final game of the season against Akron, the school fired Paul Haynes after five losing seasons. On December 19, the school hired Sean Lewis as head coach.

== Coaching staff ==
Name	Title
Paul Haynes	Head coach
Don Treadwell	Offensive coordinator/quarterbacks coach
Dave McMichael	Special teams coordinator/tight ends coach
Ben Needham	Defensive coordinator/linebackers coach
Jeff Burrow	Co-defensive coordinator/safeties coach
Doc Gamble	Wide receivers coach
Mark Spencer	Recruiting coordinator/running backs coach
Colin Ferrell	Defensive line coach
Rob Zeitman	Offensive line coach
Joe Tresey	Cornerbacks coach

== Schedule ==
Date	Time	Opponent	Site	TV	Result	Attendance
September 2	12:00 p.m.	at No. 5 Clemson*	Memorial Stadium; Clemson, SC	ESPN	L 3–56	80,121
September 9	3:30 p.m.	Howard (FCS)*	Dix Stadium; Kent, OH	ESPN3	W 38–31	20,312
September 16	6:30 p.m.	at Marshall*	Joan C. Edwards Stadium; Huntington, WV	CUSA.TV	L 0–21	24,044
September 23	12:00 p.m.	at No. 19 Louisville*	Papa John's Cardinal Stadium; Louisville, KY	ACCRSN	L 3–42	47,812
September 30	3:30 p.m.	Buffalo	Dix Stadium; Kent, OH	ESPN3	L 13–27	12,355
October 7	3:30 p.m.	at Northern Illinois	Huskie Stadium; DeKalb, IL	ESPN3	L 3–24	11,398
October 14	3:30 p.m.	Miami (OH)^{†}	Dix Stadium; Kent, OH	ESPN3	W 17–14	20,537
October 21	12:00 p.m.	at Ohio	Peden Stadium; Athens, OH	ESPN3	L 3–48	19,540
October 31	8:00 p.m.	Bowling Green	Dix Stadium; Kent, OH (Anniversary Award)	ESPNU	L 16–44	7,140
November 8	7:00 p.m.	at Western Michigan	Waldo Stadium; Kalamazoo, MI	CBSSN	L 20–48	9,584
November 14	7:00 p.m.	Central Michigan	Dix Stadium; Kent, OH	ESPNU	L 23–42	5,580
November 21	7:00 p.m.	at Akron	InfoCision Stadium; Akron, OH (Wagon Wheel)	ESPNU	L 14–24	21,683
*Non-conference game; ^{†}Homecoming; Rankings from AP Poll released prior to the game; All times are in Eastern time

== Game summaries ==
=== At Clemson ===
	1	2	3	4	Total
Golden Flashes	0	3	0	0	3
No. 5 Tigers	21	7	21	7	56

=== Howard ===
	1	2	3	4	Total
Bison	7	7	10	7	31
Golden Flashes	14	7	2	15	38

=== At Marshall ===
	1	2	3	4	Total
Golden Flashes	0	0	0	0	0
Thundering Herd	0	7	0	14	21

=== At Louisville ===
	1	2	3	4	Total
Golden Flashes	0	3	0	0	3
No. 19 Cardinals	21	7	14	0	42

=== Buffalo ===
	1	2	3	4	Total
Bulls	7	13	7	0	27
Golden Flashes	0	13	0	0	13

=== At Northern Illinois ===
	1	2	3	4	Total
Golden Flashes	0	3	0	0	3
Huskies	7	7	10	0	24

=== Miami (OH) ===
	1	2	3	4	Total
RedHawks	0	14	0	0	14
Golden Flashes	0	3	14	0	17

=== At Ohio ===
	1	2	3	4	Total
Golden Flashes	3	0	0	0	3
Bobcats	0	13	28	7	48

=== Bowling Green ===
	1	2	3	4	Total
Falcons	17	3	14	10	44
Golden Flashes	0	9	0	7	16

=== At Western Michigan ===
	1	2	3	4	Total
Golden Flashes	14	0	0	6	20
Broncos	21	10	3	14	48

=== Central Michigan ===
	1	2	3	4	Total
Chippewas	7	21	0	14	42
Golden Flashes	3	14	0	6	23

=== At Akron ===
	1	2	3	4	Total
Golden Flashes	0	7	7	0	14
Zips	10	14	0	0	24
