= 2017 Akron Zips football team =

American college football season

2017 Akron Zips football

MAC East Division champion

MAC Championship, L 28–45 vs. Toledo

Boca Raton Bowl, L 3–50 vs. Florida Atlantic
- Conference: Mid-American Conference
- East Division
- Record: 7–7 (6–2 MAC)
- Head coach: Terry Bowden (6th season)
- Offensive coordinator: A. J. Milwee (5th season)
- Offensive scheme: Spread
- Defensive coordinator: Chuck Amato (6th season)
- Base defense: 4–3
- Home stadium: InfoCision Stadium–Summa Field

2017 Mid-American Conference football standings
| | Conf. | | | Overall |
| Team | W | | L | W | | L |
|---|---|---|---|---|---|---|
East Division
| Akron xy | 6 | – | 2 | 7 | – | 7 |
| Ohio | 5 | – | 3 | 9 | – | 4 |
| Miami (OH) | 4 | – | 4 | 5 | – | 7 |
| Buffalo | 4 | – | 4 | 6 | – | 6 |
| Bowling Green | 2 | – | 6 | 2 | – | 10 |
| Kent State | 1 | – | 7 | 2 | – | 10 |
West Division
| Toledo xy$ | 7 | – | 1 | 11 | – | 3 |
| Central Michigan | 6 | – | 2 | 8 | – | 5 |
| Northern Illinois | 6 | – | 2 | 8 | – | 5 |
| Western Michigan | 4 | – | 4 | 6 | – | 6 |
| Eastern Michigan | 3 | – | 5 | 5 | – | 7 |
| Ball State | 0 | – | 8 | 2 | – | 10 |
Championship: Toledo 45, Akron 28
$ – Conference champion; x – Division champion/co-champions; y – Championship game participant

The 2017 Akron Zips football team represented the University of Akron in the 2017 NCAA Division I FBS football season. They were led by sixth-year head coach Terry Bowden and played their home games at InfoCision Stadium–Summa Field in Akron, Ohio, as members of the East Division of the Mid-American Conference. The Zips finished the season 7–7, 6–2 in MAC play to win the East Division. They lost to Toledo in the MAC Championship. They received an invitation to play in the Boca Raton Bowl where they lost to Florida Atlantic.

Notable players: Ulysees Gilbert III, Kyron Brown, Jamal Davis, Kwadarrius Smith.

== Preseason ==
In a preseason poll Aof league media, Akron was picked to finish fourth in the East Division.

== Coaching staff ==
| Name | Title | Years at Akron | Alma mater |
|---|---|---|---|
| Terry Bowden | Head coach | 6 | West Virginia |
| Chuck Amato | Assoc. head coach and def. coord. | 6 | NC State |
| Todd Stroud | Asst. head coach and DL coach | 6 | Florida State |
| A. J. Milwee | Off. coord. and QB coach | 6 | North Alabama |
| Jeff Bowden | ST coord. and WR coach | 6 | Florida State |
| Trent Boykin | TE and h-backs coach | 6 | Youngstown State |
| Brett Ekkens | OL coach | 2 | Mount Union |
| Eric Hickson | RB coach | 3 | Kansas State |
| Otis Mounds | CB coach | 4 | Auburn |
| Mike Woodford | Safeties coach | 6 | Arizona |
| Mark Ouimet | Assistant director of football operations | 6 | Siena Heights |
| Matt Gildersleeve | S&C coach | 4 | Mount Union |
| Hunter Bowden | GA, offense | 2 | North Alabama |
| Mike Schuff | GA, offense | 1 | Mount Union |
| Dylan Evans | GA, defense | 1 | Akron |
| Nick Verna | GA, defense | 2 | Akron |

== Schedule ==
| Date | Time | Opponent | Site | TV | Result | Attendance |
|---|---|---|---|---|---|---|
| September 2 | Noon | at No. 6 Penn State* | Beaver Stadium; University Park, PA | ABC | L 0–52 | 101,684 |
| September 9 | 6:30 p.m. | Arkansas–Pine Bluff* | InfoCision Stadium; Akron, OH | ESPN3 | W 52–3 | 17,464 |
| September 16 | Noon | Iowa State* | InfoCision Stadium; Akron, OH | CBSSN | L 14–41 | 22,811 |
| September 23 | 6:00 p.m. | at Troy* | Veterans Memorial Stadium; Troy, AL | ESPN3 | L 17–22 | 27,324 |
| September 30 | 6:00 p.m. | at Bowling Green | Doyt Perry Stadium; Bowling Green, OH | ESPN3 | W 34–23 | 15,111 |
| October 7 | 3:30 p.m. | Ball State^{†} | InfoCision Stadium; Akron, OH | ESPN3 | W 31–3 | 20,199 |
| October 15 | 1:00 p.m. | at Western Michigan | Waldo Stadium; Kalamazoo, MI | CBSSN | W 14–13 | 16,568 |
| October 21 | Noon | at Toledo | Glass Bowl; Toledo, OH | WTOL/ESPN3 | L 21–48 | 20,414 |
| October 28 | 11:30 a.m. | Buffalo | InfoCision Stadium; Akron, OH | CBSSN | W 21–20 | 17,427 |
| November 7 | 7:30 p.m. | at Miami (OH) | Yager Stadium; Oxford, OH | ESPN2 | L 14–24 | 12,813 |
| November 14 | 7:00 p.m. | Ohio | InfoCision Stadium; Akron, OH | ESPN2 | W 37–34 | 17,832 |
| November 21 | 7:00 p.m. | Kent State | InfoCision Stadium; Akron, OH (Wagon Wheel) | ESPNU | W 24–14 | 21,683 |
| December 2 | Noon | vs. Toledo | Ford Field; Detroit, MI (MAC Championship Game) | ESPN | L 28–45 | 16,225 |
| December 19 | 7:00 p.m. | at Florida Atlantic | FAU Stadium; Boca Raton, Florida (Boca Raton Bowl) | ESPN | L 3–50 | 25,912 |
*Non-conference game; ^{†}Homecoming; Rankings from AP Poll released prior to the game; All times are in Eastern time

== Game summaries ==
=== At No. 6 Penn State ===
| | 1 | 2 | 3 | 4 | Total |
|---|---|---|---|---|---|
| Zips | 0 | 0 | 0 | 0 | 0 |
| No. 6 Nittany Lions | 14 | 21 | 10 | 7 | 52 |

=== Arkansas–Pine Bluff ===
| | 1 | 2 | 3 | 4 | Total |
|---|---|---|---|---|---|
| Golden Lions | 0 | 3 | 0 | 0 | 3 |
| Zips | 14 | 17 | 14 | 7 | 52 |

=== Iowa State ===
| | 1 | 2 | 3 | 4 | Total |
|---|---|---|---|---|---|
| Cyclones | 14 | 6 | 14 | 7 | 41 |
| Zips | 0 | 14 | 0 | 0 | 14 |

=== At Troy ===
| | 1 | 2 | 3 | 4 | Total |
|---|---|---|---|---|---|
| Zips | 3 | 0 | 7 | 7 | 17 |
| Trojans | 7 | 9 | 0 | 6 | 22 |

=== At Bowling Green ===
| | 1 | 2 | 3 | 4 | Total |
|---|---|---|---|---|---|
| Zips | 13 | 7 | 7 | 7 | 34 |
| Falcons | 6 | 7 | 10 | 0 | 23 |

=== Ball State ===
| | 1 | 2 | 3 | 4 | Total |
|---|---|---|---|---|---|
| Cardinals | 3 | 0 | 0 | 0 | 3 |
| Zips | 7 | 10 | 0 | 14 | 31 |

=== At Western Michigan ===
| | 1 | 2 | 3 | 4 | Total |
|---|---|---|---|---|---|
| Zips | 7 | 7 | 0 | 0 | 14 |
| Broncos | 0 | 3 | 0 | 10 | 13 |

=== At Toledo ===
| | 1 | 2 | 3 | 4 | Total |
|---|---|---|---|---|---|
| Zips | 0 | 7 | 0 | 14 | 21 |
| Rockets | 21 | 3 | 14 | 10 | 48 |

=== Buffalo ===
| | 1 | 2 | 3 | 4 | Total |
|---|---|---|---|---|---|
| Bulls | 7 | 6 | 0 | 7 | 20 |
| Zips | 7 | 7 | 0 | 7 | 21 |

=== At Miami (OH) ===
| | 1 | 2 | 3 | 4 | Total |
|---|---|---|---|---|---|
| Zips | 7 | 0 | 0 | 7 | 14 |
| RedHawks | 7 | 3 | 14 | 0 | 24 |

=== Ohio ===
| | 1 | 2 | 3 | 4 | Total |
|---|---|---|---|---|---|
| Bobcats | 14 | 10 | 3 | 7 | 34 |
| Zips | 10 | 20 | 0 | 7 | 37 |

=== Kent State ===
| | 1 | 2 | 3 | 4 | Total |
|---|---|---|---|---|---|
| Golden Flashes | 0 | 7 | 7 | 0 | 14 |
| Zips | 10 | 14 | 0 | 0 | 24 |

=== 2017 MAC Championship Game ===
| | 1 | 2 | 3 | 4 | Total |
|---|---|---|---|---|---|
| Zips | 0 | 0 | 7 | 21 | 28 |
| Rockets | 7 | 21 | 10 | 7 | 45 |

=== 2017 Boca Raton Bowl ===
| | 1 | 2 | 3 | 4 | Total |
|---|---|---|---|---|---|
| Zips | 0 | 3 | 0 | 0 | 3 |
| Owls | 7 | 14 | 15 | 14 | 50 |
