= 2017 MAC Championship Game =

2017 Marathon MAC Championship Game
- Conference Championship
Akron Zips	Toledo Rockets
(7–5)	(10–2)
28	45
Head coach: Terry Bowden	Head coach: Jason Candle
	1	2	3	4	Total
Akron	0	0	7	21	28
Toledo	7	21	10	7	45
- Date: December 2, 2017
- Season: 2017
- Stadium: Ford Field
- Location: Detroit, Michigan
- MVP: Offense: Logan Woodside, (QB, Toledo); Special Teams: Danzel McKinley-Lewis, (WR, Toledo)
- Favorite: Toledo by 20.5
- Attendance: 16,225

United States TV coverage
- Network: ESPN/IMG
- Announcers: Mark Jones, Rod Gilmore and Quint Kessenich (ESPN); Andrew Allegretta and Jon Jansen (IMG)

2017 Mid-American Conference football standings
	Conf.			Overall
Team	W		L	W		L
East Division
Akron xy	6	–	2	7	–	7
Ohio	5	–	3	9	–	4
Miami (OH)	4	–	4	5	–	7
Buffalo	4	–	4	6	–	6
Bowling Green	2	–	6	2	–	10
Kent State	1	–	7	2	–	10
West Division
Toledo xy$	7	–	1	11	–	3
Central Michigan	6	–	2	8	–	5
Northern Illinois	6	–	2	8	–	5
Western Michigan	4	–	4	6	–	6
Eastern Michigan	3	–	5	5	–	7
Ball State	0	–	8	2	–	10
Championship: Toledo 45, Akron 28
$ – Conference champion; x – Division champion/co-champions; y – Championship game participant

The 2017 MAC Championship Game was an NCAA Division I college football conference championship game for the Mid-American Conference (MAC) Championship that was played on December 2, 2017. The game featured the East Division champion Akron Zips against the West Division champion Toledo Rockets. It was the 21st MAC Football Championship Game and was played in Detroit at Ford Field. Toledo won the game 45–28 behind 4 touchdown passes from Logan Woodside.
