= 2017 Boca Raton Bowl =

2017 Cheribundi Tart Cherry Boca Raton Bowl
- 4th Boca Raton Bowl
Akron Zips	Florida Atlantic Owls
(7–6)	(10–3)
MAC	C-USA
3	50
Head coach: Terry Bowden	Head coach: Lane Kiffin
	1	2	3	4	Total
Akron	0	3	0	0	3
Florida Atlantic	7	14	15	14	50
- Date: December 19, 2017
- Season: 2017
- Stadium: FAU Stadium
- Location: Boca Raton, Florida
- MVP: Jason Driskel (QB, FAU); Azeez Al-Shaair (LB, FAU)
- Referee: Kevin Stine (Sun Belt)
- Attendance: 25,912
- Payout: US$800,000

United States TV coverage
- Network: ESPN; ESPN Radio
- Announcers: Clay Matvick, Kirk Morrison, Cole Cubelic; Radio: Steve Levy, Desmond Howard, Paul Carcaterra

The 2017 Boca Raton Bowl was a college football bowl game played on December 19, 2017, at FAU Stadium in Boca Raton, Florida, United States. The fourth edition of the Boca Raton Bowl featured the Conference USA champion Florida Atlantic Owls against the Mid-American Conference East Division champion Akron Zips. Kickoff was scheduled for 7:00 p.m. EST and the game aired on ESPN. It was one of the 2017–18 bowl games that concluded the 2017 FBS football season. Sponsored by the Cheribundi beverage company, the game was officially known as the Cheribundi Tart Cherry Boca Raton Bowl.

== Teams ==
The game featured the Akron Zips against the Florida Atlantic Owls and was the first-ever meeting between the two schools.

=== Akron Zips ===
This was Akron's third bowl game in school history, first since 2015, and first Boca Raton Bowl; the Zips previously lost one bowl game (the 2005 Motor City Bowl) and won one bowl game (the 2015 Famous Idaho Potato Bowl).

=== Florida Atlantic Owls ===
This was Florida Atlantic's third bowl game in school history, first since 2008, and first Boca Raton Bowl; the Owls won both of their previous bowl games (the 2007 New Orleans Bowl and the 2008 Motor City Bowl).

== Game summary ==
=== Scoring summary ===
Scoring summary

Quarter	Time	Drive			Team	Scoring information	Score	
Quarter	Time	Plays	Yards	TOP	Team	Scoring information	Akron	FAU
1	1:08	13	79	4:44	FAU	Willie Wright 4-yard touchdown reception from Jason Driskel, Greg Joseph kick good	0	7
2	11:14	12	42	4:54	Akron	19-yard field goal by Nick Gasser	3	7
2	5:38	14	75	5:36	FAU	Jason Driskel 3-yard touchdown run, Greg Joseph kick good	3	14
2	00:37	4	87	0:58	FAU	Devin Singletary 6-yard touchdown run, Greg Joseph kick good	3	21
3	9:13	10	52	3:13	FAU	Devin Singletary 2-yard touchdown run, Greg Joseph kick good	3	28
3	06:30	6	40	1:41	FAU	Willie Wright 13-yard touchdown reception from Jason Driskel, 2-point run good	3	36
4	14:35	6	75	1:44	FAU	Jason Driskel 7-yard touchdown run, Greg Joseph kick good	3	43
4	10:47	8	66	3:22	FAU	Devin Singletary 26-yard touchdown run, Ryan Rickel kick good	3	50
"TOP" = time of possession. For other American football terms, see Glossary of American football.							3	50

=== Statistics ===
	1	2	3	4	Total
Zips	0	3	0	0	3
Owls	7	14	15	14	50

Statistics	Akron	FAU
First downs	11	29
Total offense, yards	146	582
Rushes-yards (net)	37–69	60–312
Passing yards (net)	77	270
Passes, Comp-Att-Int	10–21–0	19–26–0
Time of Possession	27:52	32:08

Team	Category	Player	Statistics
Akron	Passing	Kato Nelson	9/15, 80 yds
Akron	Rushing	Manny Morgan	17 car, 41 yds
Akron	Receiving	A.J. Coney	2 rec, 28 yds
Florida Atlantic	Passing	Jason Driskel	19/25, 270 yds, 2 TD
Florida Atlantic	Rushing	Devin Singletary	26 car, 124 yds, 3 TD
Florida Atlantic	Receiving	Kalib Woods	4 rec, 79 yds
