= 2017 Ball State Cardinals football team =

American college football season

2017 Ball State Cardinals football
- Conference: Mid-American Conference
- West Division
- Record: 2–10 (0–8 MAC)
- Head coach: Mike Neu (2nd season)
- Offensive coordinator: Joey Lynch (4th season)
- Offensive scheme: Spread
- Defensive coordinator: David Elson (1st season)
- Base defense: 3–4
- Home stadium: Scheumann Stadium

2017 Mid-American Conference football standings
	Conf.			Overall
Team	W		L	W		L
East Division
Akron xy	6	–	2	7	–	7
Ohio	5	–	3	9	–	4
Miami (OH)	4	–	4	5	–	7
Buffalo	4	–	4	6	–	6
Bowling Green	2	–	6	2	–	10
Kent State	1	–	7	2	–	10
West Division
Toledo xy$	7	–	1	11	–	3
Central Michigan	6	–	2	8	–	5
Northern Illinois	6	–	2	8	–	5
Western Michigan	4	–	4	6	–	6
Eastern Michigan	3	–	5	5	–	7
Ball State	0	–	8	2	–	10
Championship: Toledo 45, Akron 28
$ – Conference champion; x – Division champion/co-champions; y – Championship game participant

The 2017 Ball State Cardinals football team represented Ball State University in the 2017 NCAA Division I FBS football season. They were led by second-year head coach Mike Neu and played their home games at Scheumann Stadium in Muncie, Indiana as members of the West Division of the Mid-American Conference. They finished the season 2–10, 0–8 in MAC play to finish in last place in the West Division.

== Coaching staff ==
Name	Title	Years at Ball State	Alma mater
Mike Neu	Head coach	2	Ball State
Byron Ellis	Chief of Staff	2	Southern Miss
Joey Lynch	Off. Coord./QB Coach	9	Ball State
David Elson	Def. Coord.	1	Butler
Alex Bailey	WR Coach	3	Youngstown State
Johnny Curtis	LB Coach	2	Tulane
Kyle DeVan	OL Coach	2	Oregon State
Patrick Dougherty	TE/ST Coach	4	Ohio Dominican
Chevis Jackson	DB Coach	2	LSU
Kevin Lynch	RB Coach	2	Franklin College
Keith McKenzie	DL Coach	2	Ball State
Ben Armer	S&C Coach	1	Western Michigan
Shawn Chaffee	GA, Defense	1	Wooster
Cory Connolly	GA, Defense	2	Quincy
Doug Ehinger	GA, Offense	2	Albion College
Dean Petzing	GA, Offense	1	St. Lawrence

== Schedule ==
Date	Time	Opponent	Site	TV	Result	Attendance
September 2	12:00 p.m.	at Illinois*	Memorial Stadium; Champaign, IL	BTN	L 21–24	42,505
September 9	3:05 p.m.	UAB*	Scheumann Stadium; Muncie, IN	ESPN3	W 51–31	11,555
September 16	3:00 p.m.	Tennessee Tech*	Scheumann Stadium; Muncie, IN	ESPN3	W 28–13	14,265
September 23	7:00 p.m.	at Western Kentucky*	Houchens Industries–L. T. Smith Stadium; Bowling Green, KY	STADIUM	L 21–33	17,590
September 30	7:00 p.m.	at Western Michigan	Waldo Stadium; Kalamazoo, MI	ESPN3	L 3–55	18,216
October 7	3:30 p.m.	at Akron	InfoCision Stadium; Akron, OH	ESPN3	L 3–31	20,199
October 21	3:00 p.m.	Central Michigan^{†}	Scheumann Stadium; Muncie, IN	ESPN3	L 9–56	15,850
October 26	7:00 p.m.	Toledo	Scheumann Stadium; Muncie, IN	ESPN3	L 17–58	7,103
November 2	6:00 p.m.	at Eastern Michigan	Rynearson Stadium; Ypsilanti, MI	CBSSN	L 14–56	23,465
November 9	7:00 p.m.	at Northern Illinois	Huskie Stadium; DeKalb, IL (Bronze Stalk Trophy)	CBSSN	L 17–63	6,603
November 16	7:00 p.m.	Buffalo	Scheumann Stadium; Muncie, IN	CBSSN	L 24–40	5,248
November 21	7:00 p.m.	Miami (OH)	Scheumann Stadium; Muncie, IN	ESPN3	L 7–28	5,374
*Non-conference game; ^{†}Homecoming; All times are in Eastern time

== Game summaries ==
=== At Illinois ===
	1	2	3	4	Total
Cardinals	7	0	14	0	21
Fighting Illini	6	10	0	8	24

=== UAB ===
	1	2	3	4	Total
Blazers	3	14	7	7	31
Cardinals	7	14	17	13	51

=== Tennessee Tech ===
	1	2	3	4	Total
Golden Eagles	0	7	6	0	13
Cardinals	7	14	7	0	28

=== At WKU ===
	1	2	3	4	Total
Cardinals	7	0	7	7	21
Hilltoppers	7	10	0	16	33

=== At Western Michigan ===
	1	2	3	4	Total
Cardinals	0	0	3	0	3
Broncos	14	17	17	7	55

=== At Akron ===
	1	2	3	4	Total
Cardinals	3	0	0	0	3
Zips	7	10	0	14	31

=== Central Michigan ===
	1	2	3	4	Total
Chippewas	7	21	7	21	56
Cardinals	3	3	3	0	9

=== Toledo ===
	1	2	3	4	Total
Rockets	3	21	27	7	58
Cardinals	7	3	7	0	17

=== At Eastern Michigan ===
	1	2	3	4	Total
Cardinals	7	7	0	0	14
Eagles	14	21	14	7	56

=== At Northern Illinois ===
	1	2	3	4	Total
Cardinals	7	0	10	0	17
Huskies	21	14	14	14	63

=== Buffalo ===
	1	2	3	4	Total
Bulls	10	13	14	3	40
Cardinals	0	10	7	7	24

=== Miami (OH) ===
	1	2	3	4	Total
RedHawks	14	14	0	0	28
Cardinals	0	0	0	7	7
