= 2017 Ohio Bobcats football team =

American college football season

2017 Ohio Bobcats football

Bahamas Bowl champion

Bahamas Bowl, W 41–6 vs. UAB
- Conference: Mid-American Conference
- East Division
- Record: 9–4 (5–3 MAC)
- Head coach: Frank Solich (13th season)
- Offensive coordinator: Tim Albin (13th season)
- Offensive scheme: Spread option
- Co-defensive coordinators: Jim Burrow (13th season); Ron Collins (1st season)
- Base defense: 4-3
- Captains: Javon Hagan; Joe Lowery; Troy Mangen; A.J. Ouellette; Quentin Poling
- Home stadium: Peden Stadium

2017 Mid-American Conference football standings
	Conf.			Overall
Team	W		L	W		L
East Division
Akron xy	6	–	2	7	–	7
Ohio	5	–	3	9	–	4
Miami (OH)	4	–	4	5	–	7
Buffalo	4	–	4	6	–	6
Bowling Green	2	–	6	2	–	10
Kent State	1	–	7	2	–	10
West Division
Toledo xy$	7	–	1	11	–	3
Central Michigan	6	–	2	8	–	5
Northern Illinois	6	–	2	8	–	5
Western Michigan	4	–	4	6	–	6
Eastern Michigan	3	–	5	5	–	7
Ball State	0	–	8	2	–	10
Championship: Toledo 45, Akron 28
$ – Conference champion; x – Division champion/co-champions; y – Championship game participant

The 2017 Ohio Bobcats football team represented Ohio University in the 2017 NCAA Division I FBS football season. They were led by 13th-year head coach Frank Solich and played their home games at Peden Stadium in Athens, Ohio as members of the East Division of the Mid-American Conference. They finished the season 9–4, 5–3 in MAC play to finish in second play in the East Division. They received an invitation to the Bahamas Bowl where they defeated UAB.

== Preseason ==
In a preseason poll of league media, Ohio was picked to win the East Division with 11 first place votes.

== Coaching staff ==
Name	Title	Alma mater
Frank Solich	Head coach	Nebraska, 1966
Tim Albin	Asst. head coach/offensive coordinator/running backs coach	Northwestern Oklahoma State, 1989
Jim Burrow	Asst. head coach/defensive coordinator/safeties coach	Nebraska, 1976
Scott Isphording	Co-offensive coordinator/quarterbacks coach	Hanover College, 1994
Pete Germano	Defensive line coach/Special teams coordinator	Ohio Wesleyan, 1982
Ron Collins	Linebackers coach/co-defensive coordinator	Washington State University, 1987
Dwayne Dixon	Wide receivers coach	Florida, 1985
Brian Haines	Recruiting/Special teams coordinator/tight ends coach	Marietta College, 2004
Dave Johnson	Offensive line coach	West Virginia, 1985

== Schedule ==
Ohio announced their 2017 football schedule on January 23, 2017.

Date	Time	Opponent	Site	TV	Result	Attendance
September 2	7:00 p.m.	Hampton*	Peden Stadium; Athens, OH	ESPN3	W 59–0	17,501
September 8	8:00 p.m.	at Purdue*	Ross–Ade Stadium; West Lafayette, IN	FS1	L 21–44	45,633
September 16	12:00 p.m.	Kansas*	Peden Stadium; Athens, OH	ESPNU	W 42–30	22,056
September 23	2:00 p.m.	at Eastern Michigan	Rynearson Stadium; Ypsilanti, MI	ESPN3	W 27–20 ^{2OT}	11,373
September 30	3:30 p.m.	at UMass*	McGuirk Stadium; Amherst, MA	ELVN	W 58–50	7,696
October 7	2:00 p.m.	Central Michigan^{†}	Peden Stadium; Athens, OH	ESPN3	L 23–26	23,570
October 14	3:30 p.m.	at Bowling Green	Doyt Perry Stadium; Bowling Green, OH	ESPN3	W 48–30	17,641
October 21	3:30 p.m.	Kent State	Peden Stadium; Athens, OH	ESPN3	W 48–3	19,540
October 31	8:00 p.m.	Miami (OH)	Peden Stadium; Athens, OH (Battle of the Bricks)	ESPN2	W 45–28	18,096
November 8	7:00 p.m.	Toledo	Peden Stadium; Athens, OH	ESPN2	W 38–10	15,562
November 14	7:00 p.m.	at Akron	InfoCision Stadium–Summa Field; Akron, OH	ESPN2	L 34–37	17,832
November 24	1:00 p.m.	at Buffalo	University at Buffalo Stadium; Amherst, NY	ESPN3	L 24–31	12,273
December 22	12:30 p.m.	vs. UAB*	Thomas Robinson Stadium; Nassau, Bahamas (Bahamas Bowl)	ESPN	W 41–6	13,585
*Non-conference game; ^{†}Homecoming; All times are in Eastern time

== Game summaries ==
=== Hampton ===
	1	2	3	4	Total
Pirates	0	0	0	0	0
Bobcats	7	13	26	13	59

=== At Purdue ===
	1	2	3	4	Total
Bobcats	7	0	7	7	21
Boilermakers	10	24	7	3	44

=== Kansas ===
	1	2	3	4	Total
Jayhawks	0	14	0	16	30
Bobcats	11	14	14	3	42

=== At Eastern Michigan ===
	1	2	3	4	OT	2OT	Total
Bobcats	3	7	3	0	7	7	27
Eagles	3	3	0	7	7	0	20

=== At UMass ===
	1	2	3	4	Total
Bobcats	7	20	14	17	58
Minutemen	10	17	2	21	50

=== Central Michigan ===
	1	2	3	4	Total
Chippewas	7	6	6	7	26
Bobcats	7	7	0	9	23

=== At Bowling Green ===
	1	2	3	4	Total
Bobcats	0	21	6	21	48
Falcons	6	10	7	7	30

=== Kent State ===
	1	2	3	4	Total
Golden Flashes	3	0	0	0	3
Bobcats	0	13	28	7	48

=== Miami (OH) ===
	1	2	3	4	Total
RedHawks	14	7	7	0	28
Bobcats	14	14	7	10	45

=== Toledo ===
	1	2	3	4	Total
Rockets	0	7	3	0	10
Bobcats	7	3	14	14	38

=== At Akron ===
	1	2	3	4	Total
Bobcats	14	10	3	7	34
Zips	10	20	0	7	37

=== At Buffalo ===
	1	2	3	4	Total
Bobcats	7	3	14	0	24
Bulls	24	0	0	7	31

=== Vs. UAB–Bahamas Bowl ===
	1	2	3	4	Total
Blazers	0	3	3	0	6
Bobcats	13	14	14	0	41

== Roster ==
2017 Ohio Bobcats football team roster
Players
Coaches
Offense

Pos.	#	Name	Class
WR	3	Cameron Odom	Fr
WR	4	Papi White	Jr
WR	5	Brevin Harris	Fr
WR	6	Isiah Cox	Fr
QB	7	Quinton Maxwell	So
WR	8	Elijah Ball	So
WR	9	Andrew Meyer	Jr
QB	10	Joey Duckworth	Jr
WR	11	Willie Cherry	Fr
QB	12	Nathan Rourke	So
WR	13	Hunter Edwards	Fr
WR	14	K. J. Minter	Fr
QB	15	Drew Keszei	Fr
WR	16	Markel Davis	So
WR	17	Siurpry Rinvil	Fr
WR	18	Keevon Harris	Fr
WR	19	D. L. Knock	So
WR	20	Tyler Tupa	Fr
RB	21	Maleek Irons	Jr
RB	22	David Burroughs	Jr
RB	23	Julian Ross	Fr
RB	26	Dylan Wears	So
RB	27	Jake Neatherton	Fr
RB	28	Dorian Brown	Sr
WR	28	Steven David	So
WR	30	Colin Calloway	So
RB	36	Andrew Vu	So
TE	44	Adam Luehrman	Fr
RB	45	A. J. Ouellette	Jr
OL	52	Jake Pruehs	Sr
OL	53	Marques Grimes	So
OL	55	Taeshon Trotter	Fr
OL	57	Durrell Wood	Sr
OL	58	Marshal Davis	Jr
OL	60	Austen Pleasants	So
OL	61	Brett Kittrell	Fr
OL	63	Joe Anderson	Jr
OL	65	Joe Lowery	Jr
OL	66	Brody Rodgers	Fr
OL	68	Felipe Fernandez	Fr
OL	70	Nick Sink	Fr
OL	71	Jylton Tusha	Fr
OL	73	Steven Hayes	So
OL	74	Jared McCray	Sr
OL	75	Cole Irland	Fr
OL	76	Hagen Meservy	Fr
OL	77	Adam Notestine	Fr
OL	78	Samson Jackson	Fr
OL	79	Kyle Kuhar	So
WR	80	Jerrid Marhefka	Sr
WR	81	Matt Seymour	Fr
TE	82	Troy Mangen	Sr
TE	83	Connor Brown	Jr
TE	84	Austin Conard	Fr
WR	85	Brendan Cope	Sr
TE	86	Mason Morgan	Sr
WR	87	Bryan Long Jr.	Fr
TE	88	Ryan Luehrman	Fr
TE	89	Chandler Dietz	Fr

Defense

Pos.	#	Name	Class
S	2	Javon Hagan	So
CB	2	Mayne Williams	So
CB	3	Bradd Ellis	Sr
CB	4	Jamal Hudson	Fr
CB	6	De'Vante Mitchell	Fr
CB	11	Diantre Pressley	Jr
S	12	Jarren Hampton	Fr
CB	13	London Miller	Sr
CB	14	Cameron Gunnels	Jr
LB	15	Marcus Brunson	So
DL	16	Marcus Coleman	Fr
CB	17	Tariq Drake	Fr
DL	19	Keith Key	So
CB	21	Jalen Fox	Jr
CB	22	Marlin Brooks	Fr
S	23	Kylan Nelson	Jr
S	24	Alvin Floyd	Fr
S	25	Tyler Gullett	Jr
LB	29	T. J. Robinson	Fr
S	31	Grant Cunningham	Sr
LB	32	Quentin Poling	Sr
LB	34	Eric Popp	So
LB	35	Dylan Conner	Fr
LB	36	Austin Clack	So
CB	37	Jaylen Morgan	Fr
LB	38	Chad Moore	Sr
S	39	Michael Ballentine	Fr
LB	40	Cody Grillot	Sr
CB	41	Ilyaas Motley	Fr
CB	42	Xavior Motley	Fr
S	43	Gabe Lyons	Fr
LB	46	Jacob Koons	Jr
LB	47	Evan Croutch	Jr
DL	48	Andrew Payne	Jr
LB	49	Jared Dorsa	Fr
DL	50	Kaieem Caesar	Fr
DL	51	Will Evans	Fr
LB	53	Griffin Hites	Fr
DL	54	Tony Porter	Sr
DL	55	Sam McKnight	So
LB	56	James Leyden	Fr
DL	67	Michael Massinople	Fr
DL	72	Matt Rowe	Sr
DL	88	Amos Ogun-Semore	Fr
DE	90	Trent Smart	Sr
DL	91	Wyatt Shallman	Sr
DL	92	Cleon Aloese	Sr
DL	94	Andrew Cree II	Fr
DL	95	Amir Miller	Fr
DL	96	Kevin Robbins	Sr
DL	97	Kenter Berger	Jr
DL	98	Chukwudi Chukwu	So
DL	99	Brian Arp	So

Special teams

Pos.	#	Name	Class
PK	2	Louie Zervos	So
K, P	5	Michael Farkas	So
LS	30	Jake Hale	Jr
K	33	A. J. Smith	Fr
K	44	Corey Hare	Fr
LS	59	David Bryan	Fr

Head coach

- Frank Solich

Coordinators/assistant coaches

- Jimmy Burrow (Associate head coach/defensive coordinator/safeties)
- Tim Albin (Assistant head coach/co-offensive coordinator/Pass Game Coordinator/ running backs)
- Ron Collins (Co-defensive coordinator/linebackers)
- Dave Johnson (Co-offensive coordinator/Run Game Coordinator/offensive line)
- Dwayne Dixon (Wide receivers)
- Pete Germano (Defensive line)
- Brian Haines (Special teams coordinator/recruiting coordinator/tight ends)
- Scott Isphording (Quarterbacks)
- DeAngelo Smith (Cornerbacks)

Legend

- (C) Team captain
- (S) Suspended
- (I) Ineligible
- Injured
- Redshirt

Roster
Last update: October 3, 2017
