= 2017 Toledo Rockets football team =

American college football season

2017 Toledo Rockets football

MAC champion MAC West Division champion

MAC Championship, W 45–28 vs. Akron

Dollar General Bowl, L 0–34 vs. Appalachian State
- Conference: Mid-American Conference
- West Division
- Record: 11–3 (7–1 MAC)
- Head coach: Jason Candle (2nd season)
- Offensive coordinator: Brian Wright (2nd season)
- Offensive scheme: Spread
- Defensive coordinator: Brian George (2nd season)
- Base defense: 4–3
- Home stadium: Glass Bowl

2017 Mid-American Conference football standings
	Conf.			Overall
Team	W		L	W		L
East Division
Akron xy	6	–	2	7	–	7
Ohio	5	–	3	9	–	4
Miami (OH)	4	–	4	5	–	7
Buffalo	4	–	4	6	–	6
Bowling Green	2	–	6	2	–	10
Kent State	1	–	7	2	–	10
West Division
Toledo xy$	7	–	1	11	–	3
Central Michigan	6	–	2	8	–	5
Northern Illinois	6	–	2	8	–	5
Western Michigan	4	–	4	6	–	6
Eastern Michigan	3	–	5	5	–	7
Ball State	0	–	8	2	–	10
Championship: Toledo 45, Akron 28
$ – Conference champion; x – Division champion/co-champions; y – Championship game participant

The 2017 Toledo Rockets football team represented the University of Toledo in the 2017 NCAA Division I FBS football season. They were led by second-year head coach Jason Candle and played their home games at the Glass Bowl as members of the West Division of the Mid-American Conference. They finished the season 11–3, 7–1 in MAC play to win the West Division. They defeated Akron in the MAC Championship game to become champions of the MAC. They received an invitation to the Dollar General Bowl where they lost to Appalachian State for the second consecutive year in a bowl game.

== Roster ==
2017 Toledo Rockets football team roster
Players
Coaches
Offense

Pos.	#	Name	Class
RB	2	Terry Swanson	Sr
WR	3	Diontae Johnson	So
WR	4	Danzel McKinley-Lewis	So
QB	5	Michael Julian	Sr
QB	6	Mitchell Guadagni	So
WR	7	Jon'Vea Johnson	Jr
WR	8	Andrew Davis	Jr
WR	10	Desmond Phillips	So
QB	11	Logan Woodside	Sr
QB	12	Eli Peters	RFr
QB	13	Jalen Reese	Jr
TE	14	Reggie Gilliam	So
QB	15	Jake Floriea	RFr
WR	15	Neru N'Shaka	RFr
QB	17	Caleb Martin	Fr
RB	20	Brad Smith	Sr
RB	21	Shakif Seymour	RFr
RB	23	Nicholas Sims	Fr
WR	25	Cody Thompson	Sr
WR	32	Rhett Blackman	So
RB	33	Art Thompkins	So
RB	34	Nevone McCrimmon	RFr
TE	41	Nate Swart	RFr
TE	45	Adam Kulon	Sr
OL	56	Chandler Cotterman	So
OL	57	Brandon Heidecker	So
OL	58	Cameron Bell	So
OL	60	Nate Jeppesen	Sr
OL	61	Kelvin Ateman	Fr
OL	62	Jordan Fair	So
OL	63	Woodford Lankford	Fr
OL	65	Luke Doerger	RFr
OL	67	Sami Kassem	Sr
OL	68	Mitchell Berg	Fr
OL	69	Kedonis Haslem	Fr
OL	70	Roderick Peterson	Jr
OL	71	Brant Weiss	Sr
OL	72	Bryce Harris	So
OL	76	Elijah Nkansah	Sr
OL	78	Yazeed Atariwa	Jr
WR	80	Bryce Mitchell	Fr
TE	80	Jamal Turner	Fr
WR	83	Nick Kovacs	Fr
WR	84	Darryl Richards	Sr
TE	85	Jordan Fisher	So
WR	86	Liam Allen	Sr
WR	87	Elijah Morant	Sr
WR	88	Darius Corbett	Fr
TE	89	Drew Rosi	Fr

Defense

Pos.	#	Name	Class
S	5	Ronnie Jones	So
CB	6	Trevon Mathis	Sr
DE	7	Obi Anunike	Fr
S	8	Josh Teachey	Jr
DE	9	Olasunkanmi Adeniyi	Jr
DB	11	Marcus Whitfield	Jr
DB	12	DeAmonte King	Fr
CB	13	Ka'dar Hollman	Jr
DB	15	Tycen Anderson	Fr
LB	17	Tyler Taafe	Jr
DB	20	Victor Williams	Fr
S	21	DeDarallo Blue	So
CB	24	Justin Clark	RFr
S	25	Calvin Bransford	So
DB	26	Kennedy Frazier	Sr
DB	27	Kahlil Robinson	So
LB	29	Jack Linch	Sr
LB	30	Ja'Wuan Woodley	Sr
DE	31	Zach Quinn	Sr
CB	32	Keelen Roberts	RFr
S	34	Jordan Williams	So
LB	35	AJ Crider	Fr
DB	38	Zachary Ford	Fr
DB	39	Quincy Iverson	Jr
LB	40	Tre'Shun Wilson	RFr
LB	42	Richard Olekanma	Jr
LB	43	Erik Davis	So
LB	44	Tadarrius Patterson	Fr
DE	46	Andrew Boczar	So
DL	48	Nate Givhan	Fr
LB	50	Connor Lancia	So
DE	51	Chris Norwood	So
DT	52	Marquise Moore	Sr
DL	53	Devonte' Dunn	Fr
DE	55	Lucas Maynard	So
DT	59	Josh Spurgeon	Fr
DL	73	Chad Coeling	So
DL	90	LaMarr Davis	So
DE	91	Malik Jones	Sr
DE	92	Daniel Davis	Sr
DL	93	Nate Childress	So
DT	94	Edrick Mathews	RFr
DT	95	Willie Ross Jr.	So
DT	96	David Hood	RFr
DT	97	Reggie Howard	Jr
DL	98	Tyrone Chambers	Fr
DL	99	Tuzar Skipper	Sr

Special teams

Pos.	#	Name	Class
K	37	Jameson Vest	Jr
PK	39	Samuel Vucelich	Sr
LS	47	Brad Spelman	Sr
P	49	Bailey Flint	Fr

Head coach

- Jason Candle

Coordinators/assistant coaches

- Brian George – Defensive Coordinator/Defensive Line Coach
- Brian Wright – Offensive Coordinator/Quarterbacks Coach
- Mike Bellamy – Wide Receivers Coach
- Marquel Blackwell – Running Backs Coach
- Robby Discher – Tight Ends/Special Teams Coach
- Mike Hallett – Running Game Coordinator/Offensive Line Coach
- Hank Poteat – Cornerbacks Coach
- Mike Ward – Linebackers Coach
- Ross Watson – Safeties Coach
- Eric Walters – Video Coordinator
- Brad Bichey – Director of Football Strength and Conditioning
- Andrew Terwilliger – Director of Football Operations
- Ricky Ciccone – Director of High School Relations
- Nate Cole – Director of Player Personnel
- Nancy Frazier – Football Secretary
- Larry Black Jr. – Graduate Assistant
- Jerry DiMinno – Graduate Assistant
- Josh Hendershot – Graduate Assistant
- Kevin McDonough – Video Graduate Assistant
- Thomas Pugliese – Recruiting Graduate Assistant
- Trent Voss – Graduate Assistant
- Price Burton – Recruiting Assistant
- Pat Cashmore – Quality Control
- Steve McCollom – Quality Control
- Javon Ringer – Quality Control

Legend

- (C) Team captain
- (S) Suspended
- (I) Ineligible
- Injured
- Redshirt

Roster

== Schedule ==
Date	Time	Opponent	Site	TV	Result	Attendance
August 31	7:00 p.m.	Elon*	Glass Bowl; Toledo, OH	ESPN3	W 47–13	22,104
September 9	7:00 p.m.	at Nevada*	Mackay Stadium; Reno, NV	ESPN3	W 37–24	18,617
September 16	7:00 p.m.	Tulsa*	Glass Bowl; Toledo, OH	ESPN3	W 54–51	24,239
September 23	3:30 p.m.	at No. 14 Miami (FL)*	Hard Rock Stadium; Miami Gardens, FL	ACCRSN	L 30–52	49,361
October 7	12:00 p.m.	Eastern Michigan^{†}	Glass Bowl; Toledo, OH	CBSSN	W 20–15	22,681
October 14	3:30 p.m.	at Central Michigan	Kelly/Shorts Stadium; Mount Pleasant, MI	ESPN3	W 30–10	15,572
October 21	12:00 p.m.	Akron	Glass Bowl; Toledo, OH	WTOL/ESPN3	W 48–21	20,414
October 26	7:00 p.m.	at Ball State	Scheumann Stadium; Muncie, IN	ESPN3	W 58–17	7,103
November 2	6:00 p.m.	Northern Illinois	Glass Bowl; Toledo, OH	ESPNU	W 27–17	17,084
November 8	7:00 p.m.	at Ohio	Peden Stadium; Athens, OH	ESPN2	L 10–38	15,562
November 15	8:00 p.m.	at Bowling Green	Doyt Perry Stadium; Bowling Green, OH (Battle of I-75 Trophy)	ESPNU	W 66–37	16,649
November 24	11:30 a.m.	Western Michigan	Glass Bowl; Toledo, OH	ESPNU	W 37–10	17,948
December 2	12:00 p.m.	vs. Akron	Ford Field; Detroit, MI (MAC Championship Game)	ESPN	W 45–28	16,225
December 23	7:00 p.m.	vs. Appalachian State*	Ladd–Peebles Stadium; Mobile, AL (Dollar General Bowl)	ESPN	L 0–34	28,706
*Non-conference game; ^{†}Homecoming; Rankings from AP Poll released prior to the game; All times are in Eastern time

== Game summaries ==
=== Elon ===
	1	2	3	4	Total
Phoenix	0	7	0	6	13
Rockets	13	6	21	7	47

=== At Nevada ===
	1	2	3	4	Total
Rockets	10	10	14	3	37
Wolf Pack	3	7	14	0	24

=== Tulsa ===
	1	2	3	4	Total
Golden Hurricane	21	7	9	14	51
Rockets	7	7	22	18	54

=== At Miami (FL) ===
	1	2	3	4	Total
Rockets	0	16	0	14	30
No. 14 Hurricanes	10	0	14	28	52

=== Eastern Michigan ===
	1	2	3	4	Total
Eagles	6	0	3	6	15
Rockets	3	7	7	3	20

=== At Central Michigan ===
	1	2	3	4	Total
Rockets	7	10	0	13	30
Chippewas	0	0	3	7	10

=== Akron ===
	1	2	3	4	Total
Zips	0	7	0	14	21
Rockets	21	3	14	10	48

=== At Ball State ===
	1	2	3	4	Total
Rockets	3	21	27	7	58
Cardinals	7	3	7	0	17

=== Northern Illinois ===
	1	2	3	4	Total
Huskies	7	0	7	3	17
Rockets	7	3	14	3	27

=== At Ohio ===
	1	2	3	4	Total
Rockets	0	7	3	0	10
Bobcats	7	3	14	14	38

=== At Bowling Green ===
	1	2	3	4	Total
Rockets	14	10	28	14	66
Falcons	7	14	7	9	37

=== Western Michigan ===
	1	2	3	4	Total
Broncos	0	3	7	0	10
Rockets	3	14	14	6	37

=== vs Akron–MAC Championship game ===
	1	2	3	4	Total
Zips	0	0	7	21	28
Rockets	7	21	10	7	45

=== vs Appalachian State–Dollar General Bowl ===
	1	2	3	4	Total
Mountaineers	7	13	7	7	34
Rockets	0	0	0	0	0

== After the season ==
=== NFL draft ===
The following Rocket was selected in the 2018 NFL draft following the season.

Round	Pick	Player	Position	NFL club
7	249	Logan Woodside	Quarterback	Cincinnati Bengals
