= 2017 Buffalo Bulls football team =

American college football season

2017 Buffalo Bulls football
- Conference: Mid-American Conference
- East Division
- Record: 6–6 (4–4 MAC)
- Head coach: Lance Leipold (3rd season)
- Offensive coordinator: Andy Kotelnicki (3rd season)
- Offensive scheme: Multiple pro-style
- Defensive coordinator: Brian Borland (3rd season)
- Base defense: 4–3
- Captains: Jamarl Eiland; Jarrett Franklin; Demone Harris; Khalil Hodge; James O'Hagan
- Home stadium: University at Buffalo Stadium

Uniform
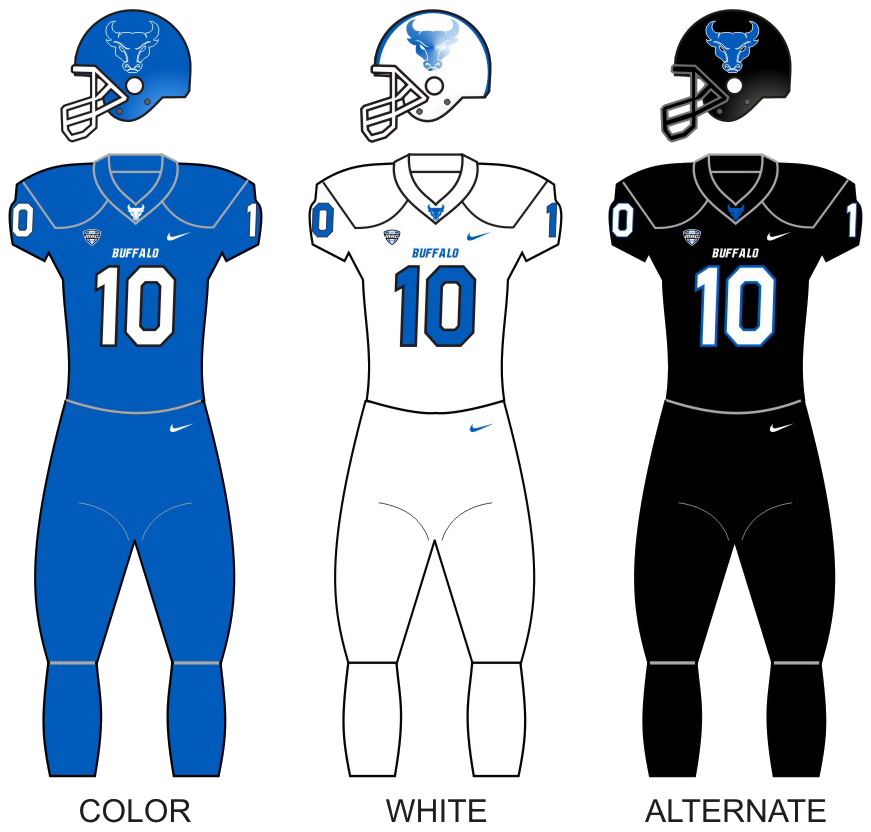

2017 Mid-American Conference football standings
	Conf.			Overall
Team	W		L	W		L
East Division
Akron xy	6	–	2	7	–	7
Ohio	5	–	3	9	–	4
Miami (OH)	4	–	4	5	–	7
Buffalo	4	–	4	6	–	6
Bowling Green	2	–	6	2	–	10
Kent State	1	–	7	2	–	10
West Division
Toledo xy$	7	–	1	11	–	3
Central Michigan	6	–	2	8	–	5
Northern Illinois	6	–	2	8	–	5
Western Michigan	4	–	4	6	–	6
Eastern Michigan	3	–	5	5	–	7
Ball State	0	–	8	2	–	10
Championship: Toledo 45, Akron 28
$ – Conference champion; x – Division champion/co-champions; y – Championship game participant

The 2017 Buffalo Bulls football team represented the University at Buffalo as a member of the Mid-American Conference (MAC) during the 2017 NCAA Division I FBS football season. Led by third-year head coach Lance Leipold, the Bulls compiled an overall record of 6–6 with a mark of 4–4 in conference play, tying for third place in the MAC's East Division. Despite being bowl-eligible, Buffalo did not receive an invitation to a bowl game. The team played home games at University at Buffalo Stadium in Amherst, New York.

On October 7, Buffalo and Western Michigan scored 139 points in a game that took a record-tying seven overtimes to settle. Buffalo lost, 71–68. The game marked the highest-scoring NCAA Division I Football Bowl Subdivision (FBS) game, breaking the previous record set in 2016.

== Schedule ==
Buffalo announced its 2017 football schedule on January 23, 2017.

Date	Time	Opponent	Site	TV	Result	Attendance
August 31	7:00 p.m.	at Minnesota*	TCF Bank Stadium; Minneapolis, MN	BTN	L 7–17	43,224
September 9	12:00 p.m.	at Army*	Michie Stadium; West Point, NY	CBSSN	L 17–21	24,017
September 16	6:00 p.m.	Colgate*	University at Buffalo Stadium; Amherst, NY	ESPN3	W 33–10	11,546
September 23	7:00 p.m.	Florida Atlantic*	University at Buffalo Stadium; Amherst, NY	ESPN3	W 34–31	14,246
September 30	3:30 p.m.	at Kent State	Dix Stadium; Kent, OH	ESPN3	W 27–13	12,355
October 7	3:30 p.m.	Western Michigan^{†}	University at Buffalo Stadium; Amherst, NY	ESPNU	L 68–71 ^{7OT}	17,048
October 14	3:30 p.m.	Northern Illinois	University at Buffalo Stadium; Amherst, NY	ESPN3	L 13–14	12,784
October 21	2:30 p.m.	at Miami (OH)	Yager Stadium; Oxford, OH	ESPN3	L 14–24	13,803
October 28	11:30 a.m.	at Akron	InfoCision Stadium–Summa Field; Akron, OH	CBSSN	L 20–21	17,427
November 7	7:30 p.m.	Bowling Green	University at Buffalo Stadium; Amherst, NY	ESPNU	W 38–28	12,205
November 16	7:00 p.m.	at Ball State	Scheumann Stadium; Muncie, IN	CBSSN	W 40–24	5,248
November 24	1:00 p.m.	Ohio	University at Buffalo Stadium; Amherst, NY	ESPN3	W 31–24	12,273
*Non-conference game; ^{†}Homecoming; All times are in Eastern time

== Game summaries ==
=== At Minnesota ===
	1	2	3	4	Total
Bulls	7	0	0	0	7
Golden Gophers	14	0	0	3	17

=== At Army ===
	1	2	3	4	Total
Bulls	3	14	0	0	17
Black Knights	7	0	0	14	21

=== Colgate ===
	1	2	3	4	Total
Raiders	3	0	7	0	10
Bulls	20	10	0	3	33

=== Florida Atlantic ===
	1	2	3	4	Total
Owls	7	10	0	14	31
Bulls	14	3	7	10	34

=== At Kent State ===
	1	2	3	4	Total
Bulls	7	13	7	0	27
Golden Flashes	0	13	0	0	13

=== Western Michigan ===
	1	2	3	4	OT	2OT	3OT	4OT	5OT	6OT	7OT	Total
Broncos	10	7	7	7	7	7	0	8	6	6	6	71
Bulls	14	0	0	17	7	7	0	8	6	6	3	68

=== Northern Illinois ===
	1	2	3	4	Total
Huskies	0	14	0	0	14
Bulls	3	10	0	0	13

=== At Miami (OH) ===
	1	2	3	4	Total
Bulls	0	7	0	7	14
RedHawks	10	0	14	0	24

=== At Akron ===
	1	2	3	4	Total
Bulls	7	6	0	7	20
Zips	7	7	0	7	21

=== Bowling Green ===
	1	2	3	4	Total
Falcons	7	7	7	7	28
Bulls	21	0	7	10	38

=== At Ball State ===
	1	2	3	4	Total
Bulls	10	13	14	3	40
Cardinals	0	10	7	7	24

=== Ohio ===
	1	2	3	4	Total
Bobcats	7	3	14	0	24
Bulls	24	0	0	7	31

== Coaching staff ==
Name	Title
Lance Leipold	Head coach
Rob Ianello	Associate head coach/wide receivers coach
Brian Borland	Defensive coordinator/safeties coach
Andy Kotelnicki	Offensive coordinator/running backs coach
Daryl Agpalsa	Offensive line coach
Alan Hensell	Tight ends coach
Chris Simpson	Linebackers coach
Tim Edwards	Defensive line coach
Jim Zebrowski	Quarterbacks coach
Taiwo Onatolu	Cornerbacks coach
Chad Bumphis	Graduate assistant
