= 2018 Mid-American Conference football season =

2018 Mid American Conference football season
- League: NCAA Division I Football Bowl Subdivision
- Sport: Football
- Duration: August 30, 2018 – January 2019
- Teams: 12

Regular season
- Season MVP: Tyree Jackson
- East Division champions: Buffalo
- West Division champions: Northern Illinois

MAC Championship Game
- Champions: Northern Illinois
- Runners-up: Buffalo

Football seasons
- 2017 2019

2018 Mid-American Conference football standings
	Conf.			Overall
Team	W		L	W		L
East Division
Buffalo x	7	–	1	10	–	4
Miami (OH)	6	–	2	6	–	6
Ohio	6	–	2	9	–	4
Akron	2	–	6	4	–	8
Bowling Green	2	–	6	3	–	9
Kent State	1	–	7	2	–	10
West Division
Northern Illinois x$	6	–	2	8	–	6
Western Michigan	5	–	3	7	–	6
Eastern Michigan	5	–	3	7	–	6
Toledo	5	–	3	7	–	6
Ball State	3	–	5	4	–	8
Central Michigan	0	–	8	1	–	11
Championship: Northern Illinois 30, Buffalo 29
$ – Conference champion; x – Division champion/co-champions

The 2018 Mid-American Conference football season will be the 73rd season for the Mid-American Conference (MAC). and is part of the 2018 NCAA Division I FBS football season. The season will begin on August 30 and will end on November 24. The entire schedule was released on February 22. The MAC Championship Game will be held on November 30, 2018.

== Preseason ==
=== Preseason poll ===
The MAC Preseason Media Poll was released at the MAC Media Day on July 24, 2018 in Detroit, Michigan.

==== East ====
1. Ohio (21)
2. Buffalo (1)
3. Miami (2)
4. Akron
5. Bowling Green
6. Kent State

==== West ====
1. Northern Illinois (15)
2. Toledo (7)
3. Western Michigan (1)
4. Eastern Michigan
5. Central Michigan (1)
6. Ball State

(first place votes)

==== MAC Championship ====
Ohio received 13 votes as the predicted 2018 MAC Championship Game winner. Toledo (5), Northern Illinois (4), Miami (1), and Central Michigan (1) also received votes.

== Head coaches ==
=== Coaching changes ===
On November 22, 2018, one day after Kent State's final game of the season against Akron, the school fired head coach Paul Haynes after five losing seasons. On December 19, the school hired Sean Lewis as head coach.

=== Coaches ===
Team	Head coach	Previous job	Years at school	Overall record	MAC record	MAC titles
Akron	Terry Bowden	North Alabama	7	31–44 (.413)	21–27 (.438)	0
Ball State	Mike Neu	New Orleans Saints (QB Coach)	3	6–18 (.250)	1–15 (.063)	0
Bowling Green	Mike Jinks	Texas Tech (Assist. Head Coach)	3	6–18 (.250)	5–11 (.313)	0
Buffalo	Lance Leipold	Wisconsin-Whitewater	4	13–23 (.361)	8–16 (.333)	0
Central Michigan	John Bonamego	Detroit Lions (Special Teams Coordinator)	4	21–18 (.538)	15–9 (.625)	0
Eastern Michigan	Chris Creighton	Drake	5	15–34 (.306)	8–24 (.250)	0
Kent State	Sean Lewis	Syracuse (Co-Off. Coordinator)	1	0–0 (–)	0–0 (–)	0
Miami	Chuck Martin	Notre Dame (Off. Coordinator)	5	16–33 (.327)	14–18 (.438)	0
Northern Illinois	Rod Carey	Northern Illinois (Off. Coordinator)	6	44–24 (.647)	33–8 (.805)	1
Ohio	Frank Solich	Nebraska	14	97–71 (.577)	60–40 (.600)	0
Toledo	Jason Candle	Toledo (Off. Coordinator)	3	21–7 (.750)	13–3 (.813)	1
Western Michigan	Tim Lester	Purdue (QB coach)	2	6–6 (.500)	4–4 (.500)	0

Notes:

- All records, appearances, titles, etc. are from time with current school only.
- Records are through the beginning of the 2018 season only.

== Schedule ==
=== Regular season ===
Index to colors and formatting
MAC member won
MAC member lost
MAC teams in **bold**

==== Week One ====
Date	Time	Visiting team	Home team	Site	TV	Result	Attendance	Ref.
August 30	7:00 p.m.	Central Connecticut	**Ball State**	Scheumann Stadium • Muncie, IN	ESPN+	**W** 48–6	9,801	
August 31	6:00 p.m.	Syracuse	**Western Michigan**	Waldo Stadium • Kalamazoo, MI	CBSSN	**L** 42–55	20,628	
August 31	6:30 p.m.	Monmouth	**Eastern Michigan**	Rynearson Stadium • Ypsilanti, MI	ESPN+	**W** 51–17	14,357	
September 1	12:00 p.m.	**Kent State**	Illinois	Memorial Stadium • Champaign, IL	BTN	**L** 24–31	31,898	
September 1	2:00 p.m.	Howard	**Ohio**	Peden Stadium • Athens, OH	ESPN+	**W** 38–32	18,275	
September 1	3:30 p.m.	Marshall	**Miami (OH)**	Yager Stadium • Oxford, OH	ESPN+	**L** 28–35	15,827	
September 1	3:30 p.m.	**Central Michigan**	Kentucky	Kroger Field • Lexington, KY	ESPNU	**L** 20–35	49,138	
September 1	3:30 p.m.	**Northern Illinois**	Iowa	Kinnick Stadium • Iowa City, IA	BTN	**L** 7–33	67,510	
September 1	6:00 p.m.	Delaware State	**Buffalo**	UB Stadium • Amherst, NY	ESPN3	**W** 48–10	17,959	
September 1	6:00 p.m.	VMI	**Toledo**	Glass Bowl • Toledo, OH	ESPN3	**W** 66–3	24,136	
September 1	8:00 p.m.	**Akron**	Nebraska	Memorial Stadium • Lincoln, NE	FOX	**Cancelled**		
September 1	8:00 p.m.	**Bowling Green**	No. 24 Oregon	Autzen Stadium • Eugene, OR	P12N	**L** 24–58	50,112	
^{#}Rankings from AP Poll released prior to game. All times are in Eastern Time.

Akron at Nebraska was canceled following a three-hour delay for lightning and thunderstorms.

Players of the week:

East Division
Offensive		Defensive		Special teams	
Player	Team	Player	Team	Player	Team
Tyree Jackson	Buffalo	Jim Jones	Kent State	DL Knock	Ohio

West Division
Offensive		Defensive		Special teams	
Player	Team	Player	Team	Player	Team
D'Wayne Eskridge	Western Michigan	Devonni Reed	Central Michigan	Cody Thompson	Toledo

==== Week Two ====
Date	Time	Visiting team	Home team	Site	TV	Result	Attendance	Ref.
September 8	12:00 p.m.	**Eastern Michigan**	Purdue	Ross–Ade Stadium • West Lafayette, IN	BTN	**W** 20–19	47,661	
September 8	12:00 p.m.	**Western Michigan**	Michigan	Michigan Stadium • Ann Arbor, MI	FS1	**L** 3–49	110,814	
September 8	3:00 p.m.	Kansas	**Central Michigan**	Kelly/Shorts Stadium • Mount Pleasant, MI	ESPN+	**L** 7–31	18,127	
September 8	3:30 p.m.	Morgan State	**Akron**	InfoCision Stadium • Akron, OH	ESPN+	**W** 41–7	18,413	
September 8	3:30 p.m.	**Buffalo**	Temple	Lincoln Financial Field • Philadelphia, PA	ESPN3	**W** 36–29	25,511	
September 8	3:30 p.m.	Howard	**Kent State**	Dix Stadium • Kent, OH	ESPN+	**W** 54–14	15,242	
September 8	3:30 p.m.	**Ball State**	No. 8 Notre Dame	Notre Dame Stadium • South Bend, IN	NBC	**L** 16–24	77,622	
September 8	6:00 p.m.	Maryland	**Bowling Green**	Doyt Perry Stadium • Bowling Green, OH	ESPN+	**L** 14–45	16,142	
September 8	7:30 p.m.	Utah	**Northern Illinois**	Huskie Stadium • DeKalb, IL	ESPNews	**L** 6–17	16,762	
September 8	8:00 p.m.	**Miami (OH)**	Cincinnati	Paul Brown Stadium • Cincinnati, OH (Victory Bell)	ESPN3	**L** 0–21	16,062	
^{#}Rankings from AP Poll released prior to game. All times are in Eastern Time.

Players of the week:

East Division
Offensive		Defensive		Special teams	
Player	Team	Player	Team	Player	Team
Tyree Jackson	Buffalo	Cameron Lewis	Buffalo	Nick Gasser	Akron

West Division
Offensive		Defensive		Special teams	
Player	Team	Player	Team	Player	Team
Tyler Wiegers	Eastern Michigan	Sutton Smith	Northern Illinois	Chad Ryland	Eastern Michigan

==== Week Three ====
Date	Time	Visiting team	Home team	Site	TV	Result	Attendance	Ref.
September 15	12:00 p.m.	**Ball State**	Indiana	Memorial Stadium • Bloomington, IN	BTN	**L** 10–38	40,240	
September 15	12:00 p.m.	**Kent State**	No. 11 Penn State	Beaver Stadium • University Park, PA	FS1	**L** 10–63	106,528	
September 15	12:00 p.m.	No. 21 Miami (FL)	**Toledo**	Glass Bowl • Toledo, OH	ESPN2	**L** 24–49	28,117	
September 15	3:30 p.m.	**Miami (OH)**	Minnesota	TCF Bank Stadium • Minneapolis, MN	BTN	**L** 3–26	41,162	
September 15	3:30 p.m.	**Central Michigan**	**Northern Illinois**	Huskie Stadium • DeKalb, IL	ESPN+	**NIU** 24–16	12,354	
September 15	4:15 p.m.	**Ohio**	Virginia	Vanderbilt Stadium • Nashville, TN (Note: Moved from Scott Stadium in anticipation of Hurricane Florence.)	ESPN2	**L** 31–45	5,438	
September 15	7:30 p.m.	**Akron**	Northwestern	Ryan Field • Evanston, IL	BTN	**W** 39–34	40,014	
September 15	4:00 p.m.	Eastern Kentucky	**Bowling Green**	Doyt Perry Stadium • Bowling Green, OH	ESPN3	**W** 42–35	17,542	
September 15	6:00 p.m.	**Eastern Michigan**	**Buffalo**	UB Stadium • Amherst, NY	ESPN+	**UB** 35–28	18,384	
September 15	7:00 p.m.	Delaware State	**Western Michigan**	Waldo Stadium • Kalamazoo, MI	ESPN+	**W** 68–0	23,244	
^{#}Rankings from AP Poll released prior to game. All times are in Eastern Time.

Players of the week:

East Division
Offensive		Defensive		Special teams	
Player	Team	Player	Team	Player	Team
K. J. Osborn	Buffalo	Alvin Davis	Akron	Michael Farkas	Ohio

West Division
Offensive		Defensive		Special teams	
Player	Team	Player	Team	Player	Team
Diontae Johnson	Toledo	Malik Fountain	Central Michigan	Jake Julien	Eastern Michigan

==== Week Four ====
Date	Time	Visiting team	Home team	Site	TV	Result	Attendance	Ref.
September 22	12:00 p.m.	**Kent State**	Ole Miss	Vaught–Hemingway Stadium • Oxford, MS	SECN	**L** 17–38	50,417	
September 22	12:00 p.m.	**Buffalo**	Rutgers	High Point Solutions Stadium • Piscataway, NJ	BTN	**W** 42–13	34,574	
September 22	12:00 p.m.	**Akron**	Iowa State	Jack Trice Stadium • Ames, IA	FSN	**L** 13–26	54,028	
September 22	12:00 p.m.	**Ohio**	Cincinnati	Nippert Stadium • Cincinnati, OH	ESPNU	**L** 30–34	35,220	
September 22	12:00 p.m.	Nevada	**Toledo**	Glass Bowl • Toledo, OH	CBSSN	**W** 63–44	23,675	
September 22	2:00 p.m.	**Western Michigan**	Georgia State	Georgia State Stadium • Atlanta, GA	ESPN+	**W** 34–15	15,264	
September 22	3:00 p.m.	**Miami (OH)**	**Bowling Green**	Doyt Perry Stadium • Bowling Green, OH	ESPN+	**MIOH** 38–23	14,380	
September 22	3:00 p.m.	Western Kentucky	**Ball State**	Scheumann Stadium • Muncie, IN	ESPN3	**L** 20–28	15,873	
September 22	3:00 p.m.	Maine	**Central Michigan**	Kelly/Shorts Stadium • Mount Pleasant, MI	ESPN+	**W** 17–5	16,474	
September 22	3:30 p.m.	**Northern Illinois**	Florida State	Doak Campbell Stadium • Tallahassee, FL	ESPNU	**L** 19–37	65,633	
September 22	10:30 p.m.	**Eastern Michigan**	San Diego State	SDCCU Stadium • San Diego, CA	CBSSN	**L** 23–20 ^{OT}	30,898	
^{#}Rankings from AP Poll released prior to game. All times are in Eastern Time.

Players of the week:

East Division
Offensive		Defensive		Special teams	
Player	Team	Player	Team	Player	Team
Alonzo Smith	Miami (OH)	Khalil Hodge	Buffalo	Nick Gasser	Akron

West Division
Offensive		Defensive		Special teams	
Player	Team	Player	Team	Player	Team
Mitchell Guadagni	Toledo	Maxx Crosby	Eastern Michigan	Gavin Peddie	Western Michigan

==== Week Five ====
Date	Time	Visiting team	Home team	Site	TV	Result	Attendance	Ref.
September 29	12:00 p.m.	**Bowling Green**	Georgia Tech	Bobby Dodd Stadium • Atlanta, GA	ACCRSN	**L** 17–63	40,740	
September 29	12:00 p.m.	Army	**Buffalo**	UB Stadium • Amherst, NY	CBSSN	**L** 13–42	23,671	
September 29	12:00 p.m.	**Central Michigan**	No. 21 Michigan State	Spartan Stadium • East Lansing, MI	FS1	**L** 20–31	73,752	
September 29	2:00 p.m.	UMass	**Ohio**	Peden Stadium • Athens, OH	ESPN3	**W** 58–42	19,056	
September 29	3:00 p.m.	**Kent State**	**Ball State**	Scheumann Stadium • Muncie, IN	ESPN+	**BALL** 52–24	9,367	
September 29	3:30 p.m.	**Western Michigan**	**Miami (OH)**	Yager Stadium • Oxford, OH	ESPN+	**WMU** 40–39	15,012	
September 29	6:00 p.m.	**Northern Illinois**	**Eastern Michigan**	Rynearson Stadium • Ypsilanti, MI	ESPN+	**NIU** 26–23 ^{3OT}	14,779	
September 29	10:30 p.m.	**Toledo**	Fresno State	Bulldog Stadium • Fresno, CA	ESPNU	**L** 49–27	33,401	
^{#}Rankings from AP Poll released prior to game. All times are in Eastern Time.

Players of the week:

East Division
Offensive		Defensive		Special teams	
Player	Team	Player	Team	Player	Team
Nathan Rourke	Ohio	Khalil Hodge	Buffalo	Maurice Thomas	Miami (OH)

West Division
Offensive		Defensive		Special teams	
Player	Team	Player	Team	Player	Team
Jayden Reed	Western Michigan	Antonio Jones-Davis	Northern Illinois	Jake Julien	Eastern Michigan

==== Week Six ====
Date	Time	Visiting team	Home team	Site	TV	Result	Attendance	Ref.
October 6	12:00 p.m.	Buffalo	Central Michigan	Kelly/Shorts Stadium • Mount Pleasant, MI	CBSSN	**UB** 34–24	14,044	
October 6	12:00 p.m.	Eastern Michigan	Western Michigan	Waldo Stadium • Kalamazoo, MI (Michigan MAC Trophy)	ESPN+	**WMU** 27–24	24,282	
October 6	3:00 p.m.	Northern Illinois	Ball State	Scheumann Stadium • Muncie, IN (Bronze Stalk Trophy)	ESPN3	**NIU** 24–16	7,159	
October 6	3:30 p.m.	Miami (OH)	Akron	InfoCision Stadium • Akron, OH	ESPN+	**MIOH** 41–17	22,437	
October 6	3:30 p.m.	Bowling Green	Toledo	Glass Bowl • Toledo, OH (Battle of I-75 Trophy)	ESPN+	**TOL** 52–26	24,685	
October 6	3:30 p.m.	Ohio	Kent State	Dix Stadium • Kent, OH	ESPN+	**OHIO** 27–26	20,062	
^{#}Rankings from AP Poll released prior to game. All times are in Eastern Time.

Players of the week:

East Division
Offensive		Defensive		Special teams	
Player	Team	Player	Team	Player	Team
Nathan Rourke	Ohio	Brad Koenig	Miami (OH)	Matthew Trickett	Kent State

West Division
Offensive		Defensive		Special teams	
Player	Team	Player	Team	Player	Team
Eli Peters	Toledo	Ralph Holley	Western Michigan	Jake Julien	Eastern Michigan

==== Week Seven ====
Date	Time	Visiting team	Home team	Site	TV	Result	Attendance	Ref.
October 13	12:00 p.m.	Akron	Buffalo	UB Stadium • Amherst, NY	CBSSN	**UB** 24–6	19,506	
October 13	12:00 p.m.	Toledo	Eastern Michigan	Rynearson Stadium • Ypsilanti, MI	ESPN+	**EMU** 28–26	17,998	
October 13	2:30 p.m.	Kent State	Miami (OH)	Yager Stadium • Oxford, OH	ESPN+	**MIOH** 31–6	5,003	
October 13	3:00 p.m.	Western Michigan	Bowling Green	Doyt Perry Stadium • Bowling Green, OH	ESPN+	**WMU** 42–35	18,551	
October 13	3:00 p.m.	Ball State	Central Michigan	Kelly/Shorts Stadium • Mount Pleasant, MI	ESPN3	**BALL** 24–23	10,255	
October 13	3:30 p.m.	Ohio	Northern Illinois	Huskie Stadium • DeKalb, IL	ESPN+	**NIU** 24–21	12,138	
^{#}Rankings from AP Poll released prior to game. All times are in Eastern Time.

Players of the week:

East Division
Offensive		Defensive		Special teams	
Player	Team	Player	Team	Player	Team
Kenny Young	Miami (OH)	Khalil Hodge	Buffalo	Michael Farkas	Ohio

West Division
Offensive		Defensive		Special teams	
Player	Team	Player	Team	Player	Team
Jamauri Bogan	Western Michigan	Sutton Smith	Northern Illinois	Morgan Hagee	Ball State

==== Week Eight ====
Date	Time	Visiting team	Home team	Site	TV	Result	Attendance	Ref.
October 20	12:00 p.m.	Buffalo	**Toledo**	Glass Bowl • Toledo, OH	ESPN+	**UB** 31–17	18,114	
October 20	12:00 p.m.	Miami (OH)	Army	Michie Stadium • West Point, NY	CBSSN	**L** 30–31 ^{2OT}	38,016	
October 20	2:00 p.m.	Bowling Green	**Ohio**	Peden Stadium • Athens, OH	ESPN3	**OHIO** 49–14	19,492	
October 20	3:00 p.m.	Eastern Michigan	**Ball State**	Scheumann Stadium • Muncie, IN	ESPN+	**EMU** 42–20	14,022	
October 20	3:30 p.m.	Western Michigan	**Central Michigan**	Kelly/Shorts Stadium • Mount Pleasant, MI (Michigan MAC Trophy/Victory Cannon)	ESPN+	**WMU** 35–10	10,097	
October 20	3:30 p.m.	Akron	**Kent State**	Dix Stadium • Kent, OH (Wagon Wheel)	ESPN+	**AKR** 24–23 ^{OT}	18,774	
^{#}Rankings from AP Poll released prior to game. All times are in Eastern Time.

Players of the week:

East Division
Offensive		Defensive		Special teams	
Player	Team	Player	Team	Player	Team
Nathan Rourke	Ohio	Brad Koenig	Miami (OH)	Derek Adams	Kent State

West Division
Offensive		Defensive		Special teams	
Player	Team	Player	Team	Player	Team
Tyler Wiegers	Eastern Michigan	Alex Grace	Western Michigan	Jake Julien; Bailey Flint	Eastern Michigan; Toledo

==== Week Nine ====
Date	Time	Visiting team	Home team	Site	TV	Result	Attendance	Ref.
October 25	7:00 p.m.	**Ball State**	**Ohio**	Peden Stadium • Athens, OH	CBSSN	**OHIO** 52–14	13,774	
October 25	7:00 p.m.	**Toledo**	**Western Michigan**	Waldo Stadium • Kalamazoo, MI	ESPN2	**TOL** 51–24	11,389	
October 27	12:00 p.m.	**Central Michigan**	**Akron**	InfoCision Stadium • Akron, OH	ESPN3	**AKR** 17–10	17,582	
October 27	12:00 p.m.	Army	**Eastern Michigan**	Rynearson Stadium • Ypsilanti, MI	CBSSN	**L** 22–37	22,627	
October 27	2:30 p.m.	**Northern Illinois**	BYU	LaVell Edwards Stadium • Provo, UT	ESPNU	**W** 7–6	51,084	
^{#}Rankings from AP Poll released prior to game. All times are in Eastern Time.

Players of the week:

East Division
Offensive		Defensive		Special teams	
Player	Team	Player	Team	Player	Team
A. J. Ouellette	Ohio	John Lako	Akron	Louie Zervos	Ohio

West Division
Offensive		Defensive		Special teams	
Player	Team	Player	Team	Player	Team
Cody Thompson	Toledo	Mykelti Williams	Northern Illinois	Matt Ference	Northern Illinois

==== Week Ten ====
Date	Time	Visiting team	Home team	Site	TV	Result	Attendance	Ref.
October 30	8:00 p.m.	Kent State	Bowling Green	Doyt Perry Stadium • Bowling Green, OH (Anniversary Award)	ESPNU	**KENT** 35–28	13,131	
October 30	8:00 p.m.	Miami (OH)	Buffalo	UB Stadium • Amherst, NY	ESPN2	**UB** 51–42	15,682	
October 31	7:30 p.m.	Ball State	Toledo	Glass Bowl • Toledo, OH	ESPN2	**TOL** 45–13	15,214	
November 1	7:00 p.m.	Northern Illinois	Akron	InfoCision Stadium • Akron, OH	CBSSN	**NIU** 36–26	16,401	
November 1	7:00 p.m.	Ohio	Western Michigan	Waldo Stadium • Kalamazoo, MI	ESPNU	**OHIO** 59–14	11,935	
November 3	12:00 p.m.	Central Michigan	Eastern Michigan	Rynearson Stadium • Ypsilanti, MI (Michigan MAC Trophy/rivalry)	ESPN3	**EMU** 17–7	13,468	
^{#}Rankings from AP Poll released prior to game. All times are in Eastern Time.

Players of the week:

East Division
Offensive		Defensive		Special teams	
Player	Team	Player	Team	Player	Team
Tyree Jackson	Buffalo	Dalton Hicks	Kent State	Alvin Floyd	Ohio

West Division
Offensive		Defensive		Special teams	
Player	Team	Player	Team	Player	Team
Tre Harbison	Northern Illinois	Jalen McKie	Northern Illinois	Jameson Vest	Toledo

==== Week Eleven ====
Date	Time	Visiting team	Home team	Site	TV	Result	Attendance	Ref.
November 6	7:30 p.m.	**Kent State**	**Buffalo**	UB Stadium • Buffalo, NY	ESPNU	**UB** 48–14	15,078	
November 7	7:00 p.m.	**Ohio**	**Miami (OH)**	Yager Stadium • Oxford, OH (Battle of the Bricks)	ESPNU	**MIOH** 30–28	15,975	
November 7	8:00 p.m.	**Toledo**	**Northern Illinois**	Huskie Stadium • DeKalb, IL	ESPN2	**NIU** 38–15	5,887	
November 10	12:00 p.m.	**Akron**	**Eastern Michigan**	Rynearson Stadium • Ypsilanti, MI	ESPN3	**EMU** 27–7	12,403	
November 10	3:00 p.m.	**Bowling Green**	**Central Michigan**	Kelly/Shorts Stadium • Mount Pleasant, MI	ESPN+	**BGSU** 24–13	8,041	
^{#}Rankings from AP Poll released prior to game. All times are in Eastern Time.

Players of the week:

East Division
Offensive		Defensive		Special teams	
Player	Team	Player	Team	Player	Team
Jaret Patterson	Buffalo	Justin Brandon	Buffalo	Kyle Kramer	Miami (OH)

West Division
Offensive		Defensive		Special teams	
Player	Team	Player	Team	Player	Team
Tre Harbison	Northern Illinois	Maxx Crosby	Eastern Michigan	Sutton Smith	Northern Illinois

==== Week Twelve ====
Date	Time	Visiting team	Home team	Site	TV	Result	Attendance	Ref.
November 13	6:00 p.m.	**Western Michigan**	**Ball State**	Scheumann Stadium • Muncie, IN	ESPN2	**BALL** 42–41 ^{OT}	5,503	
November 14	7:00 p.m.	**Buffalo**	**Ohio**	Peden Stadium • Athens, OH	ESPN2	**OHIO** 52–17	13,839	
November 14	8:00 p.m.	**Miami (OH)**	**Northern Illinois**	Huskie Stadium • DeKalb, IL	ESPNU	**MIOH** 13–7	4,878	
November 15	6:00 p.m.	**Toledo**	**Kent State**	Dix Stadium • Kent, OH	CBSSN	**TOL** 56–34	5,387	
November 17	3:30 p.m.	**Bowling Green**	**Akron**	InfoCision Stadium • Akron, OH	ESPN3	**BGSU** 21–6	17,742	
^{#}Rankings from AP Poll released prior to game. All times are in Eastern Time.

Players of the week:

East Division
Offensive		Defensive		Special teams	
Player	Team	Player	Team	Player	Team
A. J. Ouellette	Ohio	Rucker Furlow	Miami (OH)	Sam Sloman	Miami (OH)

West Division
Offensive		Defensive		Special teams	
Player	Team	Player	Team	Player	Team
Drew Plitt	Ball State	Josh Corcoran	Northern Illinois	Diontae Johnson	Toledo

==== Week Thirteen ====
Date	Time	Visiting team	Home team	Site	TV	Result	Attendance	Ref.
November 20	7:00 p.m.	Ball State	Miami (OH)	Yager Stadium • Oxford, OH	ESPN+	**MIOH** 42–21	17,639	
November 20	7:00 p.m.	Northern Illiniois	Western Michigan	Waldo Stadium • Kalamazoo, MI	ESPNU	**WMU** 28–21	18,278	
November 23	12:00 p.m.	Akron	Ohio	Peden Stadium • Athens, OH	CBSSN	**OHIO** 49–28	12,938	
November 23	12:00 p.m.	Buffalo	Bowling Green	Doyt Perry Stadium • Bowling Green, OH	ESPNU	**UB** 44–14	10,518	
November 23	12:00 p.m.	Eastern Michigan	Kent State	Dix Stadium • Kent, OH	ESPN3	**EMU** 28–20	6,125	
November 23	12:00 p.m.	Central Michigan	Toledo	Glass Stadium • Toledo, OH	ESPN3	**TOL** 51–13	15,521	
^{#}Rankings from AP Poll released prior to game. All times are in Eastern Time.

Players of the week:

East Division
Offensive		Defensive		Special teams	
Player	Team	Player	Team	Player	Team
Alonzo Smith	Miami (OH)	Brad Koenig	Miami (OH)	Kylan Nelson	Ohio

West Division
Offensive		Defensive		Special teams	
Player	Team	Player	Team	Player	Team
Ian Eriksen	Eastern Michigan	Sutton Smith	Northern Illinois	Jake Julien	Eastern Michigan

==== Week Fourteen ====
Date	Time	Visiting team	Home team	Site	TV	Result	Attendance	Ref.
December 1	12:00 p.m.	**Akron**	South Carolina	Williams–Brice Stadium • Columbia, SC	SECN	**L** 3–28	53,420	
^{#}Rankings from AP Poll released prior to game. All times are in Eastern Time.

This game was added after Akron's game vs Nebraska was canceled due to lightning and South Carolina's game vs Marshall was canceled due to Hurricane Florence.

==== MAC Championship Game ====
Date	Time	Visiting team	Home team	Site	TV	Result	Attendance	Ref.
November 30	7:00 p.m.	Northern Illinois	Buffalo	Ford Field • Detroit, MI	ESPN2	**NIU** 30–29	10,255	
^{#}Rankings from AP Poll released prior to game. All times are in Mountain Time.

== Postseason ==
=== Postseason awards ===
- Offensive Player of the Year: Tyree Jackson, QB, Buffalo
- Defensive Player of the Year: Sutton Smith, DE, Northern Illinois
- Special Teams Player of the Year: Diontae Johnson, KR/PR, Toledo
- Coach of the Year: Lance Leipold, Buffalo
- Freshman of the Year: Jaret Patterson, RB, Buffalo
- Vern Smith Leadership Award: Sutton Smith, DE, Northern Illinois

=== All-Conference Teams ===
Position	Player	Team
First Team Offense
QB	Tyree Jackson	Buffalo
RB	A. J. Ouellette	Ohio
RB	LeVante Bellamy	Western Michigan
WR	Anthony Johnson	Buffalo
WR	Papi White	Ohio
WR	Diontae Johnson	Toledo
WR	Cody Thompson	Toledo
TE	Tyler Mabry	Buffalo
OL	James O'Hagan	Buffalo
OL	Max Scharping	Northern Illinois
OL	Joe Anderson	Ohio
OL	Joe Lowery	Ohio
OL	Luke Juriga	Western Michigan
First Team Defense
DL	Chuck Harris	Buffalo
DL	Mike Danna	Central Michigan
DL	Maxx Crosby	Eastern Michigan
DL	Sutton Smith	Northern Illinois
LB	Khalil Hodge	Buffalo
LB	Malik Fountain	Central Michigan
LB	Brad Koenig	Miami
LB	Antonio Jones-Davis	Northern Illinois
DB	Alvin Davis	Akron
DB	Sean Murphy-Bunting	Central Michigan
DB	Xavier Crawford	Central Michigan
DB	Javon Hagan	Ohio
First Team Special Teams
P	Michael Farkas	Ohio
K	Matt Trickett	Kent State
KR	Maurice Thomas	Miami
PR	Diontae Johnson	Toledo

Position	Player	Team
Second Team Offense
QB	Nathan Rourke	Ohio
RB	Jaret Patterson	Buffalo
RB	Tre Harbison	Northern Illinois
WR	Riley Miller	Ball State
WR	Scott Miller	Bowling Green
WR	K. J. Osborn	Buffalo
WR	Jayden Reed	Western Michigan
TE	Reggie Gilliam	Toledo
OL	Evin Ksiezarczyk	Buffalo
OL	Luke Shively	Northern Illinois
OL	Durrell Wood	Ohio
OL	Bryce Harris	Toledo
OL	John Keenoy	Western Michigan
Second Team Defense
DL	Jamal Davis II	Akron
DL	Kalil Morris	Kent State
DL	Doug Costin	Miami
DL	Josh Corcoran	Northern Illinois
LB	Ulysees Gilbert	Akron
LB	Kyle Rachwal	Eastern Michigan
LB	Kyle Pugh	Northern Illinois
LB	Evan Croutch	Ohio
DB	Kyron Brown	Akron
DB	Cameron Lewis	Buffalo
DB	Kevin McGill	Eastern Michigan
DB	Mykelti Williams	Northern Illinois
Second Team Special Teams
P	Jake Julien	Eastern Michigan
K	Ryan Tice	Central Michigan
KR	Diontae Johnson	Toledo
PR	Jayden Reed	Western Michigan

=== Bowl games ===
Legend
MAC win
MAC loss

Bowl game	Date	Site	Television	Time (EST)	MAC team	Opponent	Score	Attendance
Camellia Bowl	December 15	Cramton Bowl • Montgomery, AL	ESPN	5:30 p.m.	Eastern Michigan	Georgia Southern	21–23	17,710
Boca Raton Bowl	December 18	FAU Stadium • Boca Raton, FL	ESPN	7:00 p.m.	Northern Illinois	UAB	13–37	22,614
Frisco Bowl	December 19	Toyota Stadium • Frisco, TX	ESPN	8:00 p.m.	Ohio	San Diego State	27–0	11,029
Bahamas Bowl	December 21	Thomas Robinson Stadium • Nassau, Bahamas	ESPN	12:30 p.m.	Toledo	FIU	32–35	13,510
Famous Idaho Potato Bowl	December 21	Albertsons Stadium • Boise, ID	ESPN	4:00 p.m.	Western Michigan	BYU	18–49	18,711
Dollar General Bowl	December 22	Ladd–Peebles Stadium • Mobile, AL	ESPN	7:00 p.m.	Buffalo	Troy	32–42	31,818

== Home game attendance ==
Team	Stadium	Capacity	Game 1	Game 2	Game 3	Game 4	Game 5	Game 6	Game 7	Total	Average	% of Capacity
Akron	InfoCision Stadium–Summa Field	27,881	18,413	22,437 †	17,582	16,401	17,742			92,757	18,515	66.4%
Ball State	Scheumann Stadium	22,500	9,801	15,873 †	9,367	7,159	14,022	5,503		61,725	10,288	45.7%
Bowling Green	Doyt Perry Stadium	24,000	16,142	17,542	14,380	18,551 †	13,131	10,518		90,264	15,044	62.7%
Buffalo	UB Stadium	29,013	17,959	18,384	23,671 †	19,506	15,682	15,078		110,280	18,380	63.4%
Central Michigan	Kelly/Shorts Stadium	30,255	18,127 †	16,474	14,044	10,255	10,097	8,041		66,941	11,157	36.9%
Eastern Michigan	Rynearson Stadium	30,200	14,357	14,779	17,998	22,627 †	13,468	12,403		95,632	15,939	52.8%
Kent State	Dix Stadium	25,319	15,242	20,062 †	18,774	5,387	6,125			65,590	13,118	51.8%
Miami (OH)	Yager Stadium	24,286	15,827	15,012	5,003	15,975	17,639 †			69,456	13,891	57.2%
Northern Illinois	Huskie Stadium	24,000	16,762 †	12,354	12,138	5,887	4,878			52,019	10,404	43.3%
Ohio	Peden Stadium	24,000	18,275	19,056	19,492 †	13,774	13,839	12,938		97,374	16,229	67.6%
Toledo	Glass Bowl	26,248	24,136	**28,117** †	23,675	24,685	18,114	15,214	15,521	124,777	17,825	67.9%
Western Michigan	Waldo Stadium	30,200	20,628	23,244	24,282 †	11,389	11,935	18,278		98,021	16,337	54.1%

Bold – Exceed capacity
†Season High
