= 2017 Mid-American Conference football season =

2017 Mid American Conference football season
- League: NCAA Division I Football Bowl Subdivision
- Sport: Football
- Duration: August 31, 2017 – December 2017
- Teams: 12

Regular Season
- Season champions: Toledo Rockets
- Runners-up: Akron Zips
- Season MVP: Logan Woodside

MAC Championship Game

Football seasons
- 2016 2018

2017 Mid-American Conference football standings
	Conf.			Overall
Team	W		L	W		L
East Division
Akron xy	6	–	2	7	–	7
Ohio	5	–	3	9	–	4
Miami (OH)	4	–	4	5	–	7
Buffalo	4	–	4	6	–	6
Bowling Green	2	–	6	2	–	10
Kent State	1	–	7	2	–	10
West Division
Toledo xy$	7	–	1	11	–	3
Central Michigan	6	–	2	8	–	5
Northern Illinois	6	–	2	8	–	5
Western Michigan	4	–	4	6	–	6
Eastern Michigan	3	–	5	5	–	7
Ball State	0	–	8	2	–	10
Championship: Toledo 45, Akron 28
$ – Conference champion; x – Division champion/co-champions; y – Championship game participant

The 2017 Mid-American Conference football season was the 72nd season for the Mid-American Conference (MAC) and part of the 2017 NCAA Division I FBS football season. The season began on August 31 and ended on November 25. The entire schedule was released on March 1. The Toledo Rockets won the conference championship game over the Akron Zips.

== Preseason ==
=== Preseason Poll ===
The Preseason poll was released at the MAC Media Day in Canton, Ohio.

==== East Division ====
1. Ohio Bobcats (11), 131
2. Miami RedHawks (12), 129
3. Bowling Green Falcons (1), 88
4. Akron Zips, 79
5. Buffalo Bulls, 41
6. Kent State Golden Flashes, 36

==== West Division ====
1. Toledo Rockets (22), 142
2. Western Michigan Broncos (1), 107
3. Northern Illinois Huskies (1), 89
4. Eastern Michigan Eagles, 74
5. Central Michigan Chippewas, 62
6. Ball State Cardinals, 30

==== MAC Championship ====
The Toledo Rockets were selected as favorites to win the Mid-American Conference by receiving 21 of 24 votes. Others receiving one vote a piece were defending champions, Western Michigan Broncos, Bowling Green Falcons and Miami RedHawks.

== Schedule ==
=== Regular season ===
==== Week 1 ====
Date	Time	Visiting team	Home team	Site	TV	Result	Attendance	Ref.
August 31	7:00 p.m.	Buffalo	Minnesota	TCF Bank Stadium • Minneapolis, MN	BTN	L 7-17	43,224	
August 31	7:00 p.m.	Elon	Toledo	Glass Bowl • Toledo, OH	ESPN3	W 47-13	22,104	
August 31	7:00 p.m.	Rhode Island	Central Michigan	Kelly/Shorts Stadium • Mount Pleasant, MI	ESPN3	W 30-27 ^{3OT}	16,311	
September 1	6:30 p.m.	Charlotte	Eastern Michigan	Rynearson Stadium • Ypsilanti, MI	ESPN3	W 24-7	12,823	
September 1	8:30 p.m.	Boston College	Northern Illinois	Huskie Stadium • DeKalb, IL	CBSSN	L 20-23	16,421	
September 2	12:00 p.m.	Akron	No. 6 Penn State	Beaver Stadium • University Park, PA	ABC	L 0-52	101,684	
September 2	12:00 p.m.	Bowling Green	Michigan State	Spartan Stadium • East Lansing, MI	ESPNU	L 10-35	71,202	
September 2	12:00 p.m.	Ball State	Illinois	Memorial Stadium • Champaign, IL	BTN	L 21-24	42,505	
September 2	12:00 p.m.	Kent State	No. 5 Clemson	Memorial Stadium • Clemson, SC	ESPN	L 3-56	80,121	
September 2	5:15 p.m.	Western Michigan	No. 4 USC	Los Angeles Memorial Coliseum • Los Angeles, CA	P12N	L 31-49	61,125	
September 2	6:30 p.m.	Miami	Marshall	Joan C. Edwards Stadium • Huntington, WV	STADIUM	L 26-31	22,463	
September 2	7:00 p.m.	Hampton	Ohio	Peden Stadium • Athens, OH	ESPN3	W 59-0	17,501	
^{#}Rankings from AP Poll released prior to game. All times are in Eastern Time.

==== Week 2 ====
Date	Time	Visiting team	Home team	Site	TV	Result	Attendance	Ref.
September 8	8:00 p.m.	Ohio	Purdue	Ross–Ade Stadium • West Lafayette, IN	FS1	L 21-44	45,633	
September 9	12:00 p.m.	Buffalo	Army	Michie Stadium • West Point, NY	CBSSN	L 17-21	24,017	
September 9	2:30 pm	Eastern Illinois	Northern Illinois	Huskie Stadium • DeKalb, IL	ESPN3	W 38-10	16,722	
September 9	3:00 p.m.	Central Michigan	Kansas	Memorial Stadium • Lawrence, KS	FSN	W 45-27	28,531	
September 9	3:05 p.m.	UAB	Ball State	Scheumann Stadium • Muncie, IN	ESPN3	W 51-31	11,555	
September 9	3:30 p.m.	Howard	Kent State	Dix Stadium • Kent, OH	ESPN3	W 38-31	20,312	
September 9	3:30 p.m.	Austin Peay	Miami	Yager Stadium • Oxford, OH	ESPN3	W 31-10	15,960	
September 9	3:30 p.m.	Eastern Michigan	Rutgers	High Point Solutions Stadium • Piscataway, NJ	BTN	W 16-13	37,661	
September 9	3:30 p.m.	Western Michigan	Michigan State	Spartan Stadium • East Lansing, MI	BTN	L 14-28	72,910	
September 9	6:00 p.m.	South Dakota	Bowling Green	Doyt Perry Stadium • Bowling Green, OH	ESPN3	L 27-35	19,912	
September 9	6:30 p.m.	Arkansas–Pine Bluff	Akron	InfoCision Stadium • Akron, OH	ESPN3	W 52-3	17,464	
September 9	7:00 p.m.	Toledo	Nevada	Mackay Stadium • Reno, NV	ESPN3	W 37-24	18,617	
^{#}Rankings from AP Poll released prior to game. All times are in Eastern Time.

=== Week 3 ===
Date	Time	Visiting team	Home team	Site	TV	Result	Attendance	Ref.
September 16	12:00 p.m.	Kansas	Ohio	Peden Stadium • Athens, OH	ESPNU	W 42-30	24,000	
September 16	12:00 p.m.	Iowa State	Akron	InfoCision Stadium • Akron, OH	CBSSN	L 14-41	22,811	
September 16	12:00 p.m.	Northern Illinois	Nebraska	Memorial Stadium • Lincoln, NE	FS1	W 21-17	89,664	
September 16	3:00 p.m.	Tennessee Tech	Ball State	Scheumann Stadium • Muncie, IN	ESPN3	W 28-13	14,265	
September 16	3:30 p.m.	Central Michigan	Syracuse	Carrier Dome • Syracuse, NY	ACCN	L 17-41	33,004	
September 16	6:00 p.m.	Colgate	Buffalo	UB Stadium • Buffalo, NY	ESPN3	W 33-10	11,546	
September 16	6:30 p.m.	Kent State	Marshall	Joan C. Edwards Stadium • Huntington, WV		L 0-21	24,044	
September 16	7:00 p.m.	Tulsa	Toledo	Glass Bowl • Toledo	ESPN3	W 54-51	24,239	
September 16	7:00 p.m.	Idaho	Western Michigan	Waldo Stadium • Kalamazoo, MI	ESPN3	W 37-28	25,732	
September 16	7:30 p.m.	Bowling Green	Northwestern	Ryan Field • Evantson, IL	BTN	L 27-49	33,706	
September 16	8:00 p.m.	Cincinnati	Miami	Yager Stadium • Oxford, OH	ESPN3	L 17-21	21,811	
^{#}Rankings from AP Poll released prior to game. All times are in Eastern Time.

== Records against FBS conferences ==
2017 records against FBS conferences

Conference	Record
The American	1–1
ACC	0–6
Big Ten	2–7
Big 12	2–1
C-USA	3–4
Independents	2–2
Mountain West	1–1
Pac-12	0–1
SEC	0–1
Sun Belt	1–1
Total	12–25

=== Power–Five conferences and independents ===
Power 5 Conferences	Record
ACC	0–6
Big Ten	2–7
Big 12	2–1
Pac-12	0–1
SEC	0–1
Notre Dame	0–1
Power 5 Total	4–17

=== Group of Five conferences ===
Group of 5 Conferences	Record
American	1–1
C-USA	3–4
Mountain West	1–1
Independents (Excluding Notre Dame)	2–1
Sun Belt	1–1
FBS Total	8–8

=== FCS Subdivision ===
FCS Opponents	Record
Football Championship Subdivision	10–1
Total FCS Record	10–1

== Postseason awards ==
=== 2017 MAC Specialty Award Winners ===
Coach of The Year – Jason Candle, Toledo
Freshman of the Year – Marcus Childers, Northern Illinois
Offensive Player of the Year – Logan Woodside, Toledo
Defensive Player of the Year – Sutton Smith, Northern Illinois
Special Teams Player of the Year – Darius Phillips, Western Michigan
Vern Smith Leadership Award Winner – Logan Woodside, Toledo

=== All-Conference teams ===
2017 All–MAC First Team Offense
Quarterback – Logan Woodside, Toledo
Offensive Lineman – Max Scharping, Northern Illinois
Offensive Lineman – Chukwuma Okorafor, Western Michigan
Offensive Linemen – Elijah Nkansah, Toledo
Offensive Lineman – Brant Weiss, Toledo
Offensive Lineman – John Keenoy, Western Michigan
Tight End – Shane Wimann, Northern Illinois
Wide Receiver – Diontae Johnson, Toledo
Wide Receiver – Anthony Johnson, Buffalo
Wide Receiver – James Gardner, Miami
Wide Receiver – Sergio Bailey, Eastern Michigan
Running Back – Jarvion Franklin, Western Michigan
Running Back – Terry Swanson, Toledo
Placekicker – Jameson Vest, Toledo

2017 All–MAC First team Defense
Outside Linebacker – Ulysees Gilbert, Akron
Outside Linebacker – Jim Jones, Kent State
Inside Linebacker – Khalil Hodge, Buffalo
Inside Linebacker – Quentin Poling, Ohio
Down Lineman – Sutton Smith, Northern Illinois
Down Lineman – Maxx Crosby, Eastern Michigan
Down Lineman – Joe Ostman, Central Michigan
Down Lineman – Anthony Winbush, Ball State
Defensive Back – Amari Coleman, Central Michigan
Defensive Back – Darius Phillips, Western Michigan
Defensive Back – Brody Hoying, Eastern Michigan
Defensive Back – Shawun Lurry, Northern Illinois
Punter – Joe Davidson, Bowling Green

2017 All–MAC First Team Specialists
Kickoff Return Specialist – Darius Phillips, Western Michigan
Punt Return Specialist – Diontae Johnson, Toledo

2017 All–MAC Second Team Offense
Quarterback – Nathan Rourke, Ohio
Offensive Lineman – Jake Pruehs, Ohio
Offensive Lineman – Jimmy Leatiota, Eastern Michigan
Offensive Lineman – Joe Lowery, Ohio
Offensive Lineman – Luke Juriga, Western Michigan
Offensive Lineman – Joe Anderson, Ohio
Tight End – Donnie Ernsberger, Western Michigan
Wide Receiver – Corey Willis, Central Michigan
Wide Receiver – Justin Hall, Ball State
Wide Receiver – Papi White, Ohio
Wide Receiver – Teo Redding, Bowling Green
Running Back – A. J. Ouellette, Ohio
Running Back – Jonathan Ward, Central Michigan
Placekicker – Jake Suder, Bowling Green

2017 All–MAC Second Team Defense
Outside Linebacker – Bobby Jones IV, Northern Illinois
Outside Linebacker – Chad Moore, Ohio
Inside Linebacker – Robert Spillane, Western Michigan
Inside Linebacker – Malik Fountain, Central Michigan
Down Lineback – Jeremiah Harris, Eastern Michigan
Down Lineback – Ola Adeniyi, Toledo
Down Lineback – Demone Harris, Buffalo
Down Lineback – Jon Cunningham, Kent State
Defensive Back – Alvin Davis, Akron
Defensive Back – Josh Cox, Central Michigan
Defensive Back – Sam Beal, Western Michigan
Defensive Back – Javon Hagan, Ohio
Punter – Derek Adams, Kent State

2017 All–MAC Second Team Specialists
Kickoff Return Specialist – Diontae Johnson, Toledo
Punt Return Specialist – Darius Phillips, Western Michigan

2017 All–MAC Third Team Offense
Quarterback – Brogan Roback, Eastern Michigan
Offensive Lineman – JP Quinn, Central Michigan
Offensive Lineman – Jordan Steckler, Northern Illinois
Offensive Lineman – James O’Hagan, Buffalo
Offensive Lineman – Vinnie Palazeti, Ball State
Offensive Lineman – Jordan Rigg, Miami
Tight End – Tyler Conklin, Central Michigan
Wide Receiver – Mark Chapman, Central Michigan
Wide Receiver – Scotty Miller, Bowling Green
Wide Receiver – Tra’Von Chapman, Akron
Wide Receiver – Spencer Tears, Northern Illinois
Running Back – Jordan Huff, Northern Illinois
Running Back – Andrew Clair, Bowling Green
Placekicker – Louie Zervos, Ohio

2017 All–MAC Third Team Defense
Outside Linebacker – Jawuan Johnson, Northern Illinois
Outside Linebacker – Asantay Brown, Western Michigan
Inside Linebacker – Jason Beck, Eastern Michigan
Inside Linebacker – Nate Locke, Bowling Green
Down Lineman – Chuck Harris, Buffalo
Down Lineman – Josh Corcoran, Northern Illinois
Down Lineman – Jamal Davis II, Akron
Down Lineman – Ikeem Allen, Miami
Defensive Back – Heath Harding, Miami
Defensive Back – Demetrius Monday, Kent State
Defensive Back – Bradd Ellis, Ohio
Defensive Back – Vince Calhoun, Eastern Michigan
Punter – Derrick Mitchell, Western Michigan

2017 All–MAC Third Team Specialists
Kickoff Return Specialist – Malik Dunner, Ball State
Punt Return Specialist – Papi White, Ohio

Power 5 Conferences	Record
ACC	0–0
Big Ten	0–0
Big 12	0–0
Pac-12	0–0
SEC	0–0
Power 5 Total	0–0
Other FBS Conferences	Record
American	0–0
C–USA	0–0
Independents (Excluding Notre Dame)	0–0
Mountain West	0–0
Sun Belt	0-0
Other FBS Total	0–0
Total Bowl Record	0–0

== Postseason ==
=== Bowl games ===
Legend
MAC win
MAC loss

(Rankings from final CFP Poll; All times EST)

Date	Time	Bowl Game	Site	TV	MAC Team	Opponent	Result
December 19, 2017	7:00 p.m.	Boca Raton Bowl	FAU Stadium • Boca Raton, FL	ESPN	Akron	Florida Atlantic	L 3–50
December 22, 2017	12:30 p.m.	Bahamas Bowl	Thomas Robinson Stadium • Nassau, Bahamas	ESPN	Ohio	UAB	W 41–6
December 22, 2017	4:00 p.m.	Famous Idaho Potato Bowl	Albertsons Stadium • Boise, ID	ESPN	Central Michigan	Wyoming	L 14–37
December 23, 2017	7:00 p.m.	Dollar General Bowl	Ladd–Peebles Stadium • Mobile, AL	ESPN	Toledo	Appalachian State	L 0–34
December 26, 2017	5:15 p.m.	Quick Lane Bowl	Ford Field • Detroit, MI	ESPN	Northern Illinois	Duke	L 14–36
