= 2018 San Diego State Aztecs football team =

American college football season

2018 San Diego State Aztecs football

Frisco Bowl, L 0–27 vs. Ohio
- Conference: Mountain West Conference
- West Division
- Record: 7–6 (4–4 MW)
- Head coach: Rocky Long (8th season)
- Offensive coordinator: Jeff Horton (4th season)
- Offensive scheme: Pro-style
- Defensive coordinator: Zach Arnett (1st season)
- Base defense: 3–3–5
- Home stadium: SDCCU Stadium

2018 Mountain West Conference football standings
	Conf.			Overall
Team	W		L	W		L
Mountain Division
No. 23 Boise State x	7	–	1	10	–	3
No. 22 Utah State	7	–	1	11	–	2
Wyoming	4	–	4	6	–	6
Air Force	3	–	5	5	–	7
Colorado State	2	–	6	3	–	9
New Mexico	1	–	7	3	–	9
West Division
No. 18 Fresno State x$	7	–	1	12	–	2
Nevada	5	–	3	8	–	5
Hawaii	5	–	3	8	–	6
San Diego State	4	–	4	7	–	6
UNLV	2	–	6	4	–	8
San Jose State	1	–	7	1	–	11
Championship: Fresno State 19, Boise State 16 (OT)
$ – Conference champion; x – Division champion/co-champions; y – Championship game participant; Rankings from AP Poll

The 2018 San Diego State Aztecs football team represented San Diego State University in the 2018 NCAA Division I FBS football season. The Aztecs were led by eighth-year head coach Rocky Long and played their home games at SDCCU Stadium. San Diego State was a member of the Mountain West Conference in the West Division. They finished the season 7–6, 4–4 in Mountain West play to finish in fourth place in the West Division. They were invited to the Frisco Bowl where they lost to Ohio.

== Recruiting ==
=== Position key ===
Back	B	Center	C	Cornerback	CB	Defensive back	DB
Defensive end	DE	Defensive lineman	DL	Defensive tackle	DT	End	E
Fullback	FB	Guard	G	Halfback	HB	Kicker	K
Kickoff returner	KR	Offensive tackle	OT	Offensive lineman	OL	Linebacker	LB
Long snapper	LS	Punter	P	Punt returner	PR	Quarterback	QB
Running back	RB	Safety	S	Tight end	TE	Wide receiver	WR

=== Recruits ===
The Aztecs signed a total of 24 recruits.

College recruiting information (2018)
Name	Hometown	School	Height	Weight	Commit date
Andrew Alves; ILB	San Diego, California	St. Augustine High School	6 ft 1 in (1.85 m)	225 lb (102 kg)	Nov 20, 2017
Andrew Alves; ILB	Recruit ratings: Scout: Rivals: 247Sports:				
Matt Araiza; K	San Diego, California	Rancho Bernardo High School	6 ft 1 in (1.85 m)	185 lb (84 kg)	Feb 9, 2018
Matt Araiza; K	Recruit ratings: Scout: Rivals: 247Sports: ESPN:				
Carson Baker; QB	La Mesa, California	Helix High School	6 ft 3 in (1.91 m)	180 lb (82 kg)	Dec 20, 2017
Carson Baker; QB	Recruit ratings: Scout: Rivals: 247Sports:				
Keshawn Banks; DE	Rio Rancho, New Mexico	Rio Rancho High School	6 ft 3 in (1.91 m)	254 lb (115 kg)	Jul 11, 2017
Keshawn Banks; DE	Recruit ratings: Scout: Rivals: 247Sports:				
Luq Barcoo; CB	Chula Vista, California	Grossmont College	6 ft 0 in (1.83 m)	170 lb (77 kg)	Feb 9, 2018
Luq Barcoo; CB	Recruit ratings: Scout: Rivals: 247Sports:				
Cedarious Barfield; ATH	El Paso, Texas	El Dorado High School	5 ft 10 in (1.78 m)	163 lb (74 kg)	Jun 24, 2017
Cedarious Barfield; ATH	Recruit ratings: Scout: Rivals: 247Sports:				
Daniel Bellinger; OLB	Las Vegas, Nevada	Palo Verde High School	6 ft 5 in (1.96 m)	220 lb (100 kg)	Jul 30, 2017
Daniel Bellinger; OLB	Recruit ratings: Scout: Rivals: 247Sports:				
Josh Bornes; OLB	San Marcos, California	San Marcos High School	6 ft 0 in (1.83 m)	190 lb (86 kg)	Jun 26, 2017
Josh Bornes; OLB	Recruit ratings: Scout: Rivals: 247Sports:				
Jordan Byrd; ATH	Albuquerque, New Mexico	Manzano High School	5 ft 10 in (1.78 m)	166 lb (75 kg)	Jun 27, 2017
Jordan Byrd; ATH	Recruit ratings: Scout: Rivals: 247Sports:				
William Dunkle; DT	Chula Vista, California	Eastlake High School	6 ft 4 in (1.93 m)	356 lb (161 kg)	Dec 18, 2017
William Dunkle; DT	Recruit ratings: Scout: Rivals: 247Sports:				
Denaylan Fuimaono; S	Carson, California	Carson High School	6 ft 0 in (1.83 m)	195 lb (88 kg)	Oct 9, 2017
Denaylan Fuimaono; S	Recruit ratings: Scout: Rivals: 247Sports:				
J.R. Justice; WR	San Diego, California	St. Augustine High School	6 ft 3 in (1.91 m)	197 lb (89 kg)	Jun 26, 2017
J.R. Justice; WR	Recruit ratings: Scout: Rivals: 247Sports: ESPN:				
Elijah Kothe; WR	Las Vegas, Nevada	Faith Lutheran High School	6 ft 3 in (1.91 m)	185 lb (84 kg)	Jul 5, 2017
Elijah Kothe; WR	Recruit ratings: Scout: Rivals: 247Sports:				
Jalil Lecky; DE	Antioch, California	College of San Mateo	6 ft 4 in (1.93 m)	215 lb (98 kg)	Feb 9, 2018
Jalil Lecky; DE	Recruit ratings: Scout: Rivals: 247Sports:				
Nic McTear; TE	Frisco, Texas	Heritage High School	6 ft 4 in (1.93 m)	220 lb (100 kg)	Dec 21, 2017
Nic McTear; TE	Recruit ratings: Scout: Rivals: 247Sports: ESPN:				
Allan Mwata; S	Henderson, Nevada	Liberty High School	5 ft 11 in (1.80 m)	180 lb (82 kg)	Jul 3, 2017
Allan Mwata; S	Recruit ratings: Scout: Rivals: 247Sports:				
Daniel Okpoko; DE	Mississauga, Ontario, Canada	St. Joseph Secondary School	6 ft 4 in (1.93 m)	235 lb (107 kg)	Feb 9, 2018
Daniel Okpoko; DE	Recruit ratings: Scout: Rivals: 247Sports:				
Joah Robinett; DE	San Diego, California	Oregon State University	6 ft 7 in (2.01 m)	260 lb (120 kg)	Feb 9, 2018
Joah Robinett; DE	Recruit ratings: Scout: Rivals: 247Sports: ESPN:				
Rashad Scott; WR	La Mesa, California	Helix High School	6 ft 1 in (1.85 m)	182 lb (83 kg)	Jun 25, 2017
Rashad Scott; WR	Recruit ratings: Scout: Rivals: 247Sports:				
Kobe Smith; WR	Gardena, California	Junipero Serra High School	6 ft 2 in (1.88 m)	178 lb (81 kg)	Feb 6, 2018
Kobe Smith; WR	Recruit ratings: Scout: Rivals: 247Sports: ESPN:				
T.J. Sullivan; WR	San Diego, California	Mt. Carmel High School	6 ft 0 in (1.83 m)	180 lb (82 kg)	Feb 9, 2018
T.J. Sullivan; WR	Recruit ratings: Scout: Rivals: 247Sports:				
Cameron Thomas; DE	Carlsbad, California	Carlsbad High School	6 ft 4 in (1.93 m)	235 lb (107 kg)	Jun 29, 2017
Cameron Thomas; DE	Recruit ratings: Scout: Rivals: 247Sports:				
Zidane Thomas; RB	Peoria, Arizona	Centennial High School	5 ft 10 in (1.78 m)	200 lb (91 kg)	Feb 7, 2018
Zidane Thomas; RB	Recruit ratings: Scout: Rivals: 247Sports: ESPN:				
Alama Uluave; OG	Honolulu, Hawaii	Punahou School	6 ft 2 in (1.88 m)	292 lb (132 kg)	Feb 9, 2018
Alama Uluave; OG	Recruit ratings: Scout: Rivals: 247Sports:				
Overall recruit ranking:
Note: In many cases, Scout, Rivals, 247Sports, On3, and ESPN may conflict in their listings of height and weight.; In these cases, the average was taken. ESPN grades are on a 100-point scale.; Sources: "San Diego State Football Commitments". Rivals.; "2018 Team Ranking". Rivals.com.

== Preseason ==
=== Award watch lists ===
Listed in the order that they were released

Award	Player	Position	Year
Maxwell Award	Juwan Washington	RB	JR
John Mackey Award	Kahale Warring	TE	JR
Lou Groza Award	John Baron II	K	SR
Paul Hornung Award	Juwan Washington	RB/KR	JR
Johnny Unitas Golden Arm Award	Christian Chapman	QB	SR

=== Mountain West media days ===
During the Mountain West media days held July 24–25 at the Cosmopolitan on the Las Vegas Strip, the Aztecs were predicted to finish in second place in the West Division.

==== Preseason All-Mountain West Team ====
The Aztecs had three players selected to the preseason all-Mountain West team.

Offense

Keith Ismael – OL

Tyler Roemer – OL

Defense

Tariq Thompson – DB

== Schedule ==
Date	Time	Opponent	Site	TV	Result	Attendance
August 31	6:00 p.m.	at No. 13 Stanford*	Stanford Stadium; Stanford, CA	FS1	L 10–31	40,913
September 8	6:00 p.m.	Sacramento State*	SDCCU Stadium; San Diego, CA		W 28–14	45,755
September 15	7:30 p.m.	No. 23 Arizona State*	SDCCU Stadium; San Diego, CA	CBSSN	W 28–21	34,641
September 22	7:30 p.m.	Eastern Michigan*	SDCCU Stadium; San Diego, CA	CBSSN	W 23–20 ^{OT}	30,898
October 6	12:30 p.m.	at Boise State	Albertsons Stadium; Boise, ID	ESPNU	W 19–13	36,679
October 12	6:00 p.m.	Air Force	SDCCU Stadium; San Diego, CA	CBSSN	W 21–17	25,326
October 20	7:30 p.m.	San Jose State^{†}	SDCCU Stadium; San Diego, CA	CBSSN	W 16–13	30,451
October 27	7:30 p.m.	at Nevada	Mackay Stadium; Reno, NV	ESPNU	L 24–28	14,545
November 3	7:15 p.m.	at New Mexico	Dreamstyle Stadium; Albuquerque, NM	ESPNU	W 31–23	14,646
November 10	7:30 p.m.	UNLV	SDCCU Stadium; San Diego, CA	ESPN2	L 24–27	24,986
November 17	7:30 p.m.	at Fresno State	Bulldog Stadium; Fresno, CA (rivalry)	CBSSN	L 14–23	36,123
November 24	7:30 p.m.	Hawaii	SDCCU Stadium; San Diego, CA	ESPNU	L 30–31 ^{OT}	28,014
December 19	5:00 p.m.	vs. Ohio*	Toyota Stadium; Frisco, TX (Frisco Bowl)	ESPN	L 0–27	11,029
*Non-conference game; ^{†}Homecoming; Rankings from AP Poll released prior to the game; All times are in Pacific time

== Game summaries ==
=== At Stanford ===
San Diego State Aztecs at No. 13 Stanford Cardinal

Quarter	1	2	3	4	Total
Aztecs	7	0	3	0	10
No. 13 Cardinal	0	9	15	7	31

at Stanford Stadium, Stanford, California

- Date: August 31, 2018
- Game time: 6:05 p.m. PDT
- Game weather: Clear, 71 °F (22 °C)
- Game attendance: 40,913
- Referee: Brandon Cruse
- TV announcers (FS1): Justin Kutcher, DeMarco Murray, and Petros Papadakis
- No. 13 Stanford beats San Diego St. 31-10 in season opener, Game Book

Game information

First Quarter

- (2:38) SDSU TD: Juwan Washington 4 yard rush, John Baron II kick
  San Diego State 7–0; 8 plays, 92 yards, 4:14

Second Quarter

- (7:35) STAN SF: Christian Chapman sacked for -5 yards in end zone
  San Diego State 7–2
- (0:27) STAN TD: J. J. Arcega-Whiteside 38 yard pass from K. J. Costello, Jet Toner kick
  Stanford 9–7; 7 plays, 79 yards, 1:53

Third Quarter

- (11:02) STAN TD: J. J. Arcega-Whiteside 19 yard pass from K. J. Costello, Jet Toner kick
  Stanford 16–7; 6 plays, 19 yards, 1:46
- (6:53) SDSU FG: Baron II 30 yard field goal
  Stanford 16–10; 9 plays, 62 yards, 4:09
- (4:43) STAN TD: J. J. Arcega-Whiteside 80 yard pass from K. J. Costello, 2-point pass good
  Stanford 24–10; 4 plays, 85 yards, 2:06

Fourth Quarter

- (10:54) STAN TD: Colby Parkinson 19 yard pass from K. J. Costello, Jet Toner kick
  Stanford 31–10; 8 plays, 53 yards, 4:02

Passing

- SDSU – Christian Chapman: 10/15, 113 yards
- STAN – K. J. Costello: 21/31, 332 yards, 4 TD, 1 INT

Rushing

- SDSU – Juwan Washington: 24 carries, 158 yards, 1 TD
- STAN – Bryce Love: 18 carries, 29 yards

Receiving

- SDSU – Ethan Dedaux: 3 receptions, 21 yards
- STAN – J. J. Arcega-Whiteside: 6 receptions, 226 yards, 3 TD

=== Sacramento State ===
Sacramento State Hornets at San Diego State Aztecs

Quarter	1	2	3	4	Total
Hornets	0	7	7	0	14
Aztecs	7	6	0	15	28

at SDCCU Stadium, San Diego

- Date: September 8, 2018
- Game time: 6:06 p.m. PDT
- Game weather: Clear, 77 °F (25 °C)
- Game attendance: 45,755
- Referee: Cal McNeill
- Juwan Washington leads San Diego State over Sacramento State, Game Book

Game information

First Quarter

- SDSU – Juwan Washington 5-yard run (John Baron II kick), 5:42. Aztecs 7–0. Drive: 9 plays, 69 yards, 4:39.

Second Quarter

- SDSU – John Baron II 52-yard field goal, 13:33. Aztecs 10–0. Drive: 4 plays, 1 yard, 1:32.
- SAC – Bryant Perkinson 1-yard run (Devon Medeiros Kick), 6:07. Aztecs 10–7. Drive: 14 plays, 75 yards, 7:26.
- SDSU – John Baron II 32-yard field goal, 0:55. Aztecs 13–7. Drive: 10 plays, 77 yards, 5:06.

Third Quarter

- SAC – Bryant Perkinson 64-yard pass from Kevin Thomson (Devon Medeiros Kick), 8:54. Hornets 14–13. Drive: 1 play, 64 yards, 0:12.

Fourth Quarter

- SDSU – Juwan Washington 4-yard run (Two-point conversion), 4:05. Aztecs 21–14. Drive: 13 plays, 82 yards, 5:13.
- SDSU – Juwan Washington 20-yard run (John Baron II kick), 2:08. Aztecs 28–14. Drive: 2 plays, 25 yards, 0:49.

Passing

- SAC – Kevin Thomson – 11/18, 177 yards, 1 TD
- SDSU – Ryan Agnew – 11/17, 159 yards, 2 INT

Rushing

- SAC – Elijah Dotson – 11 rushes, 37 yards
- SDSU – Juwan Washington – 36 rushes, 156 yards, 3 TD

Receiving

- SAC – Bryant Perkinson – 2 receptions, 80 yards, 1 TD
- SDSU – Ethan Dedeaux – 6 receptions, 90 yards

=== Arizona State ===
No. 23 Arizona State Sun Devils at San Diego State Aztecs

Quarter	1	2	3	4	Total
No. 23 Sun Devils	7	7	0	7	21
Aztecs	0	14	3	11	28

at SDCCU Stadium, San Diego

- Date: September 15, 2018
- Game time: 7:38 p.m. PDT
- Game weather: Clear, 73 °F (23 °C)
- Game attendance: 34,641
- Referee: Kevin Hassell
- TV announcers (CBSSN): Carter Blackburn, Aaron Taylor, and John Schriffen
- Agnew, Washington lead SDSU to upset of No. 23 ASU, 28-21, Game Book

Game information

First Quarter

- ASU – Brandon Aiyuk 12-yard pass from Manny Wilkins (Brandon Ruiz Kick), 0:41. Sun Devils 7–0. Drive: 9 plays, 60 yards, 2:16.

Second Quarter

- SDSU – Juwan Washington 13-yard run (John Baron II kick), 10:28. Tie 7–7. Drive: 11 plays, 75 yards, 5:13.
- ASU – Manny Wilkins 1-yard run (Brandon Ruiz Kick), 8:06. Sun Devils 14–7. Drive: 7 plays, 82 yards, 2:16.
- SDSU – Tim Wilson 9-yard pass from Ryan Agnew (John Baron II kick), 0:08. Tie 14–14. Drive: 11 plays, 85 yards, 1:33.

Third Quarter

- SDSU – John Baron II 54-yard field goal, 7:46. Aztecs 17–14. Drive: 10 plays, 40 yards, 5:35.

Fourth Quarter

- SDSU – John Baron II 36-yard field goal, 11:34. Aztecs 20–14. Drive: 12 plays, 44 yards, 5:05.
- SDSU – Chase Jasmin 3-yard run (Two-point conversion), 4:14. Aztecs 28–14. Drive: 11 plays, 62 yards, 6:16.
- ASU – N'Keal Harry 7-yard pass from Manny Wilkins (Brandon Ruiz Kick), 1:40. Aztecs 28–21. Drive: 11 plays, 82 yards, 2:28.

Passing

- ASU – Manny Wilkins – 31/46, 341 yards, 2 TD
- SDSU – Ryan Agnew – 12/24, 129 yards, 1 TD

Rushing

- ASU – Eno Benjamin – 13 rushes, 21 yards
- SDSU – Juwan Washington – 27 rushes, 138 yards, 1 TD

Receiving

- ASU – Frank Darby – 5 receptions, 127 yards
- SDSU – Ethan Dedeaux – 2 receptions, 30 yards

=== Eastern Michigan ===
Eastern Michigan Eagles at San Diego State Aztecs

Quarter	1	2	3	4	OT	Total
Eagles	3	7	7	3	0	20
Aztecs	3	14	0	3	3	23

at SDCCU Stadium, San Diego

- Date: September 22, 2018
- Game time: 7:35 p.m. PDT
- Game weather: Clear, 70 °F (21 °C)
- Game attendance: 30,898
- Referee: Ron Hudson
- TV announcers (CBSSN): Dave Ryan and Randy Cross
- Baron, Agnew help San Diego St. beat E. Michigan 23-20 in OT, Game Book

Game information

First Quarter

- SDSU – John Baron II 34-yard field goal, 6:14. Aztecs 3–0. Drive: 8 plays, 32 yards, 3:58.
- EMU – Chad Ryland 51-yard field goal, 3:12. Tie 3–3. Drive: 6 plays, 16 yards, 3:00.

Second Quarter

- SDSU – Parker Houston 25-yard pass from Ryan Agnew (John Baron II kick), 14:21. Aztecs 10–3. Drive: 7 plays, 69 yards, 3:44.
- SDSU – B. J. Busbee 24-yard pass from Ryan Agnew (John Baron II kick), 9:03. Aztecs 17–3. Drive: 6 plays, 75 yards, 2:43.
- EMU – Mike Glass 2-yard run (Chad Ryland Kick), 0:26. Aztecs 17–10. Drive: 4 plays, 34 yards, 1:14.

Third Quarter

- EMU – Arthur Jackson 37-yard pass from Mike Glass (Chad Ryland Kick), 8:15. Tie 17–17. Drive: 12 plays, 75 yards, 6:45.

Fourth Quarter

- EMU – Chad Ryland 24-yard field goal, 3:18. Eagles 20–17. Drive: 12 plays, 79 yards, 6:20.
- SDSU – John Baron II 50-yard field goal, 1:16. Tie 20–20. Drive: 6 plays, 25 yards, 1:56.

Overtime

- SDSU – John Baron II 38-yard field goal. Aztecs 23–20. Drive: 4 plays, 4 yards.

Passing

- EMU – Mike Glass – 9/16, 153 yards, 1 TD, 1 INT
- SDSU – Ryan Agnew – 12/22, 176 yards, 2 TD, 1 INT

Rushing

- EMU – Shaq Vann – 21 rushes, 76 yards
- SDSU – Chase Jasmin – 16 rushes, 94 yards

Receiving

- EMU – Line Latu – 3 receptions, 86 yards
- SDSU – Fred Trevillion – 2 receptions, 40 yards

=== At Boise State ===
San Diego State Aztecs at Boise State Broncos

Quarter	1	2	3	4	Total
Aztecs	3	10	0	6	19
Broncos	7	0	0	6	13

at Albertsons Stadium, Boise, Idaho

- Date: October 6, 2018
- Game time: 1:32 p.m. MDT
- Game weather: Cloudy, 57 °F (14 °C) • Wind: 3 MPH WNW
- Game attendance: 36,679
- Referee: Frank LeBlanc
- TV announcers (ESPNU): Mike Couzens and Kirk Morrison
- San Diego St. leans on D in upset against Boise State, 19-13, Game Book

Game information

First Quarter

- SDSU – John Baron II 36-yard field goal, 9:14. Aztecs 3–0. Drive: 4 plays, 5 yards, 1:29.
- BSU – Alexander Mattison 1-yard run (Joel Velázquez Kick), 6:48. Broncos 7–3. Drive: 3 plays, 4 yards, 1:06.

Second Quarter

- SDSU – John Baron II 41-yard field goal, 13:09. Broncos 7–6. Drive: 6 plays, 7 yards, 1:51.
- SDSU – Chase Jasmin 2-yard run (John Baron II kick), 4:36. Aztecs 13–7. Drive: 2 plays, 17 yards, 0:52.

Third Quarter
Fourth Quarter

- SDSU – Jordan Byrd 72-yard run, 10:10. Aztecs 19–7. Drive: 5 plays, 95 yards, 2:57.
- BSU – Alexander Mattison 1-yard run, 3:05. Aztecs 19–13. Drive: 11 plays, 73 yards, 2:02.

Passing

- SDSU – Ryan Agnew – 8/15, 113 yards
- BSU – Brett Rypien – 21/41, 170 yards, 2 INT

Rushing

- SDSU – Chase Jasmin – 26 rushes, 78 yards, 1 TD
- BSU – Alexander Mattison – 25 rushes, 66 yards, 2 TD

Receiving

- SDSU – Fred Trevillion – 3 receptions, 57 yards
- BSU – Sean Modster – 4 receptions, 44 yards

=== Air Force ===
Air Force Falcons at San Diego State Aztecs

Quarter	1	2	3	4	Total
Falcons	2	7	0	8	17
Aztecs	7	7	0	7	21

at SDCCU Stadium, San Diego

- Date: October 12, 2018
- Game time: 6:02 p.m. PDT
- Game weather: Clear, 67 °F (19 °C)
- Game attendance: 25,326
- Referee: Stephen Baron
- TV announcers (CBSSN): Carter Blackburn, Aaron Taylor, and John Schriffen
- Agnew's late TD pass lifts SDSU over Air Force, 21-17, Game Book

Game information

First Quarter

- SDSU – Chase Jasmin 4-yard run (John Baron II kick), 13:49. Aztecs 7–0. Drive: 3 plays, 65 yards, 1:11.
- AFA – Team safety, 0:07. Aztecs 7–2. Drive: 2 plays, -7 yards, 0:31.

Second Quarter

- AFA – Ronald Cleveland 12-yard run (Jake Koehnke Kick), 5:13. Falcons 9–7. Drive: 9 plays, 80 yards, 5:17.
- SDSU – Trenton Thompson 19-yard return of blocked punt (John Baron II kick), 0:08. Aztecs 14–9. Drive: 3 plays, 9 yards, 2:21.

Third Quarter

No scoring plays

Fourth Quarter

- AFA – Ronald Cleveland 4-yard run (Two-point conversion), 9:25. Falcons 17–14. Drive: 7 plays, 40 yards, 3:14.
- SDSU – Parker Houston 29-yard pass from Ryan Agnew (John Baron II kick), 6:10. Aztecs 21–17. Drive: 8 plays, 94 yards, 3:08.

Passing

- AFA – Isaiah Sanders – 7/15, 51 yards, 1 INT
- SDSU – Ryan Agnew – 9/25, 213 yards, 1 TD, 1 INT

Rushing

- AFA – Cole Fagan – 16 rushes, 90 yards
- SDSU – Chase Jasmin – 18 rushes, 70 yards, 1 TD

Receiving

- AFA – Kade Waguespack – 2 receptions, 31 yards
- SDSU – Fred Trevillion – 3 receptions, 94 yards

=== San Jose State ===
San Jose State Spartans at San Diego State Aztecs

Quarter	1	2	3	4	Total
Spartans	6	0	7	0	13
Aztecs	0	10	3	3	16

at SDCCU Stadium, San Diego

- Date: October 20, 2018
- Game time: 7:37 p.m. PDT
- Game weather: Clear, 70 °F (21 °C)
- Game attendance: 30,451
- Referee: Kevin Boltmann
- TV announcers (CBSSN): Carter Blackburn, Aaron Taylor, and John Schriffen
- Baron's 3 FGs help San Diego St. beat San Jose St. 16-13, Game Book

Game information

First Quarter

- SJSU – Bryce Crawford 42-yard field goal, 8:56. Spartans 3–0. Drive: 12 plays, 52 yards, 3:57.
- SJSU – Bryce Crawford 24-yard field goal, 6:25. Spartans 6–0. Drive: 8 plays, 28 yards, 2:25.

Second Quarter

- SDSU – Chase Jasmin 1-yard run (John Baron II kick), 13:11. Aztecs 7–6. Drive: 17 plays, 75 yards, 8:14.
- SDSU – John Baron II 36-yard field goal, 0:16. Aztecs 10–6. Drive: 13 plays, 74 yards, 6:29.

Third Quarter

- SDSU – John Baron II 22-yard field goal, 7:09. Aztecs 13–6. Drive: 10 plays, 85 yards, 4:32.
- SJSU – Malike Roberson 1-yard run (Bryce Crawford Kick), 0:50. Tie 13–13. Drive: 14 plays, 65 yards, 6:19.

Fourth Quarter

- SDSU – John Baron II 51-yard field goal, 4:36. Aztecs 16–13. Drive: 4 plays, 1 yard, 2:39.

Passing

- SJSU – Josh Love – 26/36, 215 yards, 1 INT
- SDSU – Ryan Agnew – 7/11, 86 yards

Rushing

- SJSU – Tyler Nevens – 20 rushes, 60 yards
- SDSU – Chance Bell – 15 rushes, 81 yards

Receiving

- SJSU – Tre Hartley – 6 receptions, 68 yards
- SDSU – Fred Trevillion – 2 receptions, 37 yards

=== At Nevada ===
San Diego State Aztecs at Nevada Wolf Pack

Quarter	1	2	3	4	Total
Aztecs	14	10	0	0	24
Wolf Pack	9	6	10	3	28

at Mackay Stadium, Reno, Nevada

- Date: October 27, 2018
- Game time: 7:35 p.m. PDT
- Game weather: Cloudy, 68 °F (20 °C)
- Game attendance: 14,545
- Referee: Reggie Smith
- TV announcers (ESPNU): Roy Philpott and Tom Ramsey
- Nevada ends drought against San Diego St. with a 28-24 win, Game Book

Game information

First Quarter

- SDSU – Chase Jasmin 2-yard pass from Ryan Agnew (John Baron II kick), 9:16. Aztecs 7–0. Drive: 12 plays, 75 yards, 5:44.
- SDSU – Kahale Warring 16-yard pass from Ryan Agnew (John Baron II kick), 4:41. Aztecs 14–0. Drive: 8 plays, 80 yards, 3:45.
- NEV – Team safety, 2:12. Aztecs 14–2. Drive: 1 play, -2 yards, 0:44.
- NEV – Toa Taua 40-yard pass from Ty Gangi (Ramiz Ahmed Kick), 0:09. Aztecs 14–9. Drive: 5 plays, 50 yards, 2:03.

Second Quarter

- NEV – Brendan O'Leary 26-yard pass from Ty Gangi, 8:50. Wolf Pack 15–14. Drive: 6 plays, 53 yards, 2:28.
- SDSU – John Baron II 26-yard field goal, 4:19. Aztecs 17–15. Drive: 11 plays, 73 yards, 4:27.
- SDSU – Kahale Warring 30-yard pass from Ryan Agnew (John Baron II kick), 1:31. Aztecs 24–15. Drive: 3 plays, 63 yards, 1:14.

Third Quarter

- NEV – Devonte Lee 2-yard run (Ramiz Ahmed Kick), 11:39. Aztecs 24–22. Drive: 8 plays, 75 yards, 3:21.
- NEV – Ramiz Ahmed 32-yard field goal, 5:13. Wolf Pack 25–24. Drive: 8 plays, 21 yards, 4:36.

Fourth Quarter

- NEV – Ramiz Ahmed 34-yard field goal, 8:54. Wolf Pack 28–24. Drive: 4 plays, 0 yards, 1:33.

Passing

- SDSU – Ryan Agnew – 20/41, 283 yards, 3 TD
- NEV – Ty Gangi – 23/43, 235 yards, 2 TD

Rushing

- SDSU – Chase Jasmin – 16 rushes, 85 yards
- NEV – Devonte Lee – 7 rushes, 32 yards, 1 TD

Receiving

- SDSU – Kahale Warring – 6 receptions, 95 yards, 2 TD
- NEV – Toa Taua – 5 receptions, 76 yards, 1 TD

=== At New Mexico ===
San Diego State Aztecs at New Mexico Lobos

Quarter	1	2	3	4	Total
Aztecs	7	0	7	17	31
Lobos	7	3	6	7	23

at Dreamstyle Stadium, Albuquerque, New Mexico

- Date: November 3, 2018
- Game time: 8:17 p.m. PDT
- Game weather: Clear, 50 °F (10 °C)
- Game attendance: 14,646
- Referee: Cal McNeill
- TV announcers (ESPNU): Mark Neely and John Congemi
- Washington's 2 TDs help San Diego St. beat New Mexico 31–23, Game Book

Game information

First Quarter

- UNM – Adebayo Soremekun 44-yard fumble return (Andrew Shelley Kick), 10:28. Lobos 7–0. Drive: 8 plays, 19 yards, 4:32.
- SDSU – Chase Jasmin 5-yard run (John Baron II kick), 3:35. Tie 7–7. Drive: 14 plays, 75 yards, 6:53.

Second Quarter

- UNM – Andrew Shelley 41-yard field goal, 3:45. Lobos 10–7. Drive: 4 plays, 8 yards, 0:37.

Third Quarter

- SDSU – Juwan Washington 34-yard run (John Baron II kick), 8:09. Aztecs 14–10. Drive: 2 plays, 43 yards, 0:33.
- UNM – Anselem Umeh 12-yard pass from Collin Gerhart, 2:15. Lobos 16–14. Drive: 2 plays, 13 yards, 0:42.

Fourth Quarter

- UNM – Delane Hart 4-yard pass from Collin Gerhart (Andrew Shelley Kick), 10:07. Lobos 23–14. Drive: 11 plays, 57 yards, 6:14.
- SDSU – Kahale Warring 19-yard pass from Christian Chapman (John Baron II kick), 7:29. Lobos 23–21. Drive: 5 plays, 75 yards, 2:38.
- SDSU – John Baron II 32-yard field goal, 2:56. Aztecs 24–23. Drive: 5 plays, 26 yards, 2:36.
- SDSU – Juwan Washington 50-yard run (John Baron II kick), 1:52. Aztecs 31–23. Drive: 2 plays, 53 yards, 0:55.

Passing

- SDSU – Christian Chapman – 13/19, 182 yards, 1 TD
- UNM – Collin Gerhart – 9/20, 41 yards, 2 TD, 1 INT

Rushing

- SDSU – Juwan Washington – 11 rushes, 95 yards, 2 TD
- UNM – Daevon Vigilant – 11 rushes, 45 yards

Receiving

- SDSU – Tim Wilson – 3 receptions, 63 yards
- UNM – Anselem Umeh – 1 reception, 12 yards, 1 TD

=== UNLV ===
UNLV Rebels at San Diego State Aztecs

Quarter	1	2	3	4	Total
Rebels	6	7	0	14	27
Aztecs	0	14	10	0	24

at SDCCU Stadium, San Diego

- Date: November 10, 2018
- Game time: 7:36 p.m. PST
- Game weather: Clear, 61 °F (16 °C)
- Game attendance: 24,986
- Referee: Michael VanderVelde
- TV announcers (ESPN2): Mark Neely, Ray Bentley, and Alex Corddry
- Thomas, UNLV beat San Diego St. 27-24, end 6-game skid, Box Score

Game information

First Quarter

- UNLV – Evan Pantels 21-yard field goal, 11:30. Rebels 3–0. Drive: 6 plays, 83 yards, 1:45.
- UNLV – Evan Pantels 45-yard field goal, 7:08. Rebels 6–0. Drive: 8 plays, 17 yards, 2:51.

Second Quarter

- SDSU – Tim Wilson 13-yard pass from Christian Chapman (John Baron II kick), 13:54. Aztecs 7–6. Drive: 8 plays, 72 yards, 3:52.
- UNLV – Lexington Thomas 2-yard run (Evan Pantels Kick), 10:35. Rebels 13–7. Drive: 8 plays, 75 yards, 3:19.
- SDSU – Juwan Washington 2-yard run (John Baron II kick), 0:28. Aztecs 14–13. Drive: 12 plays, 62 yards, 3:28.

Third Quarter

- SDSU – John Baron II 33-yard field goal, 4:51. Aztecs 17–13. Drive: 5 plays, 52 yards, 1:48.
- SDSU – Tim Wilson 34-yard pass from Ryan Agnew (John Baron II kick), 0:00. Aztecs 24–13. Drive: 4 plays, 57 yards, 1:27.

Fourth Quarter

- UNLV – Brandon Presley 10-yard pass from Max Gilliam, 9:19. Aztecs 24–19. Drive: 11 plays, 75 yards, 5:41.
- UNLV – Lexington Thomas 75-yard run (Two-point conversion), 3:27. Rebels 27–24. Drive: 4 plays, 92 yards, 1:53.

Passing

- UNLV – Max Gilliam – 16/24, 237 yards, 1 TD, 1 INT
- SDSU – Ryan Agnew – 14/26, 187 yards, 1 TD, 1 INT

Rushing

- UNLV – Lexington Thomas – 21 rushes, 133 yards, 2 TD
- SDSU – Juwan Washington – 21 rushes, 66 yards, 1 TD

Receiving

- UNLV – Darren Woods – 4 receptions, 100 yards
- SDSU – Tim Wilson – 5 receptions, 123 yards, 2 TD

=== At Fresno State ===
Battle for the Old Oil Can: San Diego State Aztecs at Fresno State Bulldogs

Quarter	1	2	3	4	Total
Aztecs	7	7	0	0	14
Bulldogs	7	3	7	6	23

at Bulldog Stadium, Fresno, California

- Date: November 17, 2018
- Game time: 7:39 p.m. PST
- Game weather: Cloudy, 55 °F (13 °C)
- Game attendance: 36,123
- Referee: David Alvarez
- TV announcers (CBSSN): Rich Waltz, Aaron Murray, and Cameron Worrell
- Fresno St. beats SDSU 23-14, clinches berth in MW title game, Game Book

Game information

First Quarter

- FRES – Jamire Jordan 86-yard pass from Marcus McMaryion (Asa Fuller Kick), 12:08. Bulldogs 7–0. Drive: 3 plays, 94 yards, 1:11.
- SDSU – Fred Trevillion 75-yard pass from Christian Chapman (John Baron II kick), 6:21. Tie 7–7. Drive: 1 play, 75 yards, 0:12.

Second Quarter

- FRES – Asa Fuller 25-yard field goal, 6:47. Bulldogs 10–7. Drive: 10 plays, 63 yards, 5:12.
- SDSU – Fred Trevillion 70-yard pass from Ryan Agnew (John Baron II kick), 6:29. Aztecs 14–10. Drive: 1 play, 70 yards, 0:11.

Third Quarter

- FRES – Ronnie Rivers 2-yard run (Asa Fuller Kick), 10:56. Bulldogs 17–14. Drive: 8 plays, 75 yards, 4:04.

Fourth Quarter

- FRES – Jordan Mims 1-yard run, 12:40. Bulldogs 23–14. Drive: 10 plays, 70 yards, 4:36.

Passing

- SDSU – Christian Chapman – 4/13, 126 yards, 1 TD
- FRES – Marcus McMaryion – 17/24, 267 yards, 1 TD

Rushing

- SDSU – Juwan Washington – 18 rushes, 38 yards
- FRES – Ronnie Rivers – 22 rushes, 78 yards, 1 TD

Receiving

- SDSU – Fred Trevillion – 4 receptions, 189 yards, 2 TD
- FRES – KeeSean Johnson – 10 receptions, 141 yards

=== Hawaii ===
Hawaii Rainbow Warriors at San Diego State Aztecs

Quarter	1	2	3	4	OT	Total
Rainbow Warriors	3	21	0	0	7	31
Aztecs	14	0	3	7	6	30

at SDCCU Stadium, San Diego

- Date: November 24, 2018
- Game time: 7:32 p.m. PST
- Game weather: Clear, 61 °F (16 °C)
- Game attendance: 28,014
- Referee: Brandon Cruse
- TV announcers (ESPNU): Mike Couzens and Kirk Morrison
- McDonald, Hawaii hold on for 31-30 OT win over San Diego St.

Game information

First Quarter

- HAW – Ryan Meskell 22-yard field goal, 8:38. Rainbow Warriors 3–0. Drive: 8 plays, 80 yards, 4:17.
- SDSU – Fred Trevillion 76-yard pass from Christian Chapman (John Baron II kick), 8:20. Aztecs. 7–3. Drive: 1 play, 76 yards, 0:12.
- SDSU – Juwan Washington 5-yard run (John Baron II kick), 5:20. Aztecs 14–3. Drive: 1 play, 5 yards, 0:06.

Second Quarter

- HAW – Elijah Dale 2-yard pass from Cole McDonald (Ryan Meskell Kick), 14:52. Aztecs 14–10. Drive: 12 plays, 75 yards, 5:28.
- HAW – Cole McDonald 1-yard run (Ryan Meskell Kick), 5:11. Rainbow Warriors 17–14. Drive: 7 plays, 95 yards, 3:25.
- HAW – Cedric Byrd 13-yard pass from Cole McDonald (Ryan Meskell Kick), 1:19. Rainbow Warriors 24–14. Drive: 5 plays, 79 yards, 1:52.

Third Quarter

- SDSU – John Baron II 53-yard field goal, 10:29. Rainbow Warriors 24–17. Drive: 7 plays, 23 yards, 2:36.

Fourth Quarter

- SDSU – Isaac Lessard 13-yard pass from Ryan Agnew (John Baron II kick), 6:07. Tie 24–24. Drive: 10 plays, 68 yards, 4:55.

Overtime

- HAW – JoJo Ward 10-yard pass from Cole McDonald (Ryan Meskell Kick). Rainbow Warriors 31–24. Drive: 6 plays, 25 yards.
- SDSU – Juwan Washington 25-yard run. Rainbow Warriors 31–30. Drive: 1 play, 25 yards.

Passing

- HAW – Cole McDonald – 29/46, 452 yards, 3 TD
- SDSU – Christian Chapman – 9/19, 149 yards, 1 TD

Rushing

- HAW – Miles Reed – 12 rushes, 47 yards
- SDSU – Juwan Washington – 31 rushes, 158 yards, 2 TD

Receiving

- HAW – Cedric Byrd – 6 receptions, 140 yards, 1 TD
- SDSU – Fred Trevillion – 2 receptions, 88 yards, 1 TD

=== Vs. Ohio (Frisco Bowl) ===
Frisco Bowl: Ohio Bobcats vs. San Diego State Aztecs

Quarter	1	2	3	4	Total
Bobcats	3	14	3	7	27
Aztecs	0	0	0	0	0

at Toyota Stadium, Frisco, Texas

- Date: December 19, 2018
- Game time: 7:05 p.m. CST
- Game weather: Rainy, 56 °F (13 °C)
- Game attendance: 11,029
- Referee: Jason Autrey
- TV announcers (ESPN): Kevin Brown, Andre Ware, and Kris Budden
- Ohio rolls to 27-0 win over San Diego State in Frisco Bowl, Game Book

Game information

First Quarter

- OHIO – Louie Zervos 30-yard field goal, 2:20. Bobcats 3–0. Drive: 12 plays, 66 yards, 6:50.

Second Quarter

- OHIO – Nathan Rourke 9-yard run (Louie Zervos Kick), 7:57. Bobcats 10–0. Drive: 15 plays, 72 yards, 6:55.
- OHIO – Nathan Rourke 11-yard run (Louie Zervos Kick), 0:07. Bobcats 17–0. Drive: 5 plays, 43 yards, 0:54.

Third Quarter

- OHIO – Louie Zervos 26-yard field goal, 11:33. Bobcats 20–0. Drive: 7 plays, 66 yards, 3:27.

Fourth Quarter

- OHIO – Andrew Meyer 35-yard pass from Nathan Rourke (Louie Zervos Kick), 12:41. Bobcats 27–0. Drive: 4 plays, 56 yards, 2:02.

Passing

- OHIO – Nathan Rourke – 10/22, 206 yards, 1 TD, 1 INT
- SDSU – Ryan Agnew – 11/24, 126 yards, 1 INT

Rushing

- OHIO – A. J. Ouellette – 29 rushes, 164 yards
- SDSU – Juwan Washington – 19 rushes, 129 yards

Receiving

- OHIO – Papi White – 4 receptions, 90 yards
- SDSU – Isaiah Richardson – 3 receptions, 58 yards

== Honors ==
=== Mountain West ===
Team	Player	Position	Year
First	Keith Ismael	OL	SO
First	Kyahva Tezino	LB	JR
Second	Ryan Pope	OL	SR
Second	John Baron	PK	SR
Second	Tariq Thompson	DB	SO
Honorable	Parker Baldwin	DB	SR
Honorable	Noble Hall	DL	SR
Honorable	Brandon Heicklen	P	JR
Honorable	Kahale Warring	TE	JR
Honorable	Juwan Washington	RB	JR

== Players drafted into the NFL ==
Round	Pick	Player	Position	NFL Club
3	86	Kahale Warring	TE	Houston Texans
