= John Keenoy =

American football player (born 1997)

No. 52
- Position: Center

Personal information
- Born: February 26, 1997 (age 29); Grand Rapids, Michigan, U.S.
- Listed height: 6 ft 3 in (1.91 m)
- Listed weight: 305 lb (138 kg)

Career information
- High school: East Kentwood (Kentwood, Michigan)
- College: Western Michigan
- NFL draft: 2019: undrafted

Career history
- Minnesota Vikings (2019)*; Dallas Renegades (2020); Pittsburgh Steelers (2020)*
- * Offseason or practice squad member only

Awards and highlights
- First-team All-MAC (2017); 2× Second-team All-MAC (2016, 2018)
- Stats at Pro Football Reference

John Keenoy (born February 26, 1997) is an American former football player. He played college football for the Western Michigan Broncos.

== Early life ==
Keenoy attended East Kentwood High School, where he was a three-star prospect. He did not have many college offers coming out of high school and was recruited to Western Michigan by P. J. Fleck.

== College career ==
Keenoy was an early enrollee at Western Michigan as a freshman and allowed 25 pressures and four sacks in 2015. Keenoy was named to the Second-team All-MAC as a sophomore in 2016 after helping Western Michigan's rushing game to finish in the top 25. Keenoy anchored an offensive line on a team that finished with a 13–1 record and a No. 15 national ranking and played in the Cotton Bowl. He missed one start in 2017 against Wagner. He was a First-team All-MAC selection in 2017 and helped the Broncos to finished in the top 25 in rushing again. Keenoy had his second consecutive season of not allowing a sack. As a senior in 2018, Keenoy helped the Broncos finish 33rd in rushing (204.6 yards per game) and 27th in sacks allowed (17). Keenoy was named to the Second-team All-Conference. He was also a three-time academic All-MAC selection. Keenoy was a four-year starter at Western Michigan, starting 51 of 52 games. He graduated with a degree in finance and was a semifinalist for the William V. Campbell Trophy, also known as the "Academic Heisman."

== Professional career ==
After not being selected in the 2019 NFL draft, Keenoy was signed as an undrafted free agent by the Minnesota Vikings. He was waived after training camp on August 31 and became a volunteer assistant at Western Michigan. Keenoy subsequently joined the Vikings practice squad.

Keenoy was selected in the ninth round of the 2020 XFL draft by the Dallas Renegades. By the fourth game of the season, he was named the starting center. However, the season was cancelled after Week 5 due to the coronavirus pandemic. He had his contract terminated when the league suspended operations on April 10, 2020.

On April 16, 2020, he was signed by the Pittsburgh Steelers. Keenoy joined offensive lineman Chukwuma Okorafor and linebacker Robert Spillane as former WMU players on the Steelers. He was waived on September 5, 2020.

== Personal life ==
His father, John Keenoy, played football at Central Michigan University, while his mother, Melissa Keenoy, played basketball at the school. Keenoy is a fan of country music and plays golf. He describes himself as a major foodie.
