= Javon Hagan =

American football player (born 1997)

No. 34
- Position: Safety

Personal information
- Born: February 22, 1997 (age 29); Jacksonville, Florida, U.S.
- Listed height: 6 ft 0 in (1.83 m)
- Listed weight: 215 lb (98 kg)

Career information
- High school: Trinity Christian (Jacksonville)
- College: Ohio
- NFL draft: 2020: undrafted

Career history
- Tampa Bay Buccaneers (2020); Arizona Cardinals (2021–2022)*
- * Offseason or practice squad member only

Awards and highlights
- Super Bowl champion (LV); 2× First-team All-MAC (2018, 2019); 2× Second-team All-MAC (2016, 2017)

Career NFL statistics
- Games played: 1 (postseason)
- Stats at Pro Football Reference

Javon Hagan (born February 22, 1997) is an American former professional football player who was a safety in the National Football League (NFL). After playing college football for the Ohio Bobcats, he signed with the Tampa Bay Buccaneers as an undrafted free agent in 2020.

== Professional career ==
=== Tampa Bay Buccaneers ===
Hagan signed with the Tampa Bay Buccaneers as an undrafted free agent following the 2020 NFL draft on May 4, 2020. He was waived during final roster cuts on September 5, and signed to the team's practice squad the next day. He was elevated to the active roster on January 16 and January 23, 2021, for the team's divisional playoff game and NFC Championship Game against the New Orleans Saints and Green Bay Packers, and reverted to the practice squad after each game. Hagan re-signed with the Buccaneers on February 9.

On August 31, 2021, Hagan was waived by the Buccaneers.

=== Arizona Cardinals ===
On October 26, 2021, Hagan was signed to the Arizona Cardinals practice squad. He signed a reserve/future contract with the Cardinals on January 19, 2022. Hagan was released by Arizona on June 16.
