= Maxx Crosby =

American football player (born 1997)

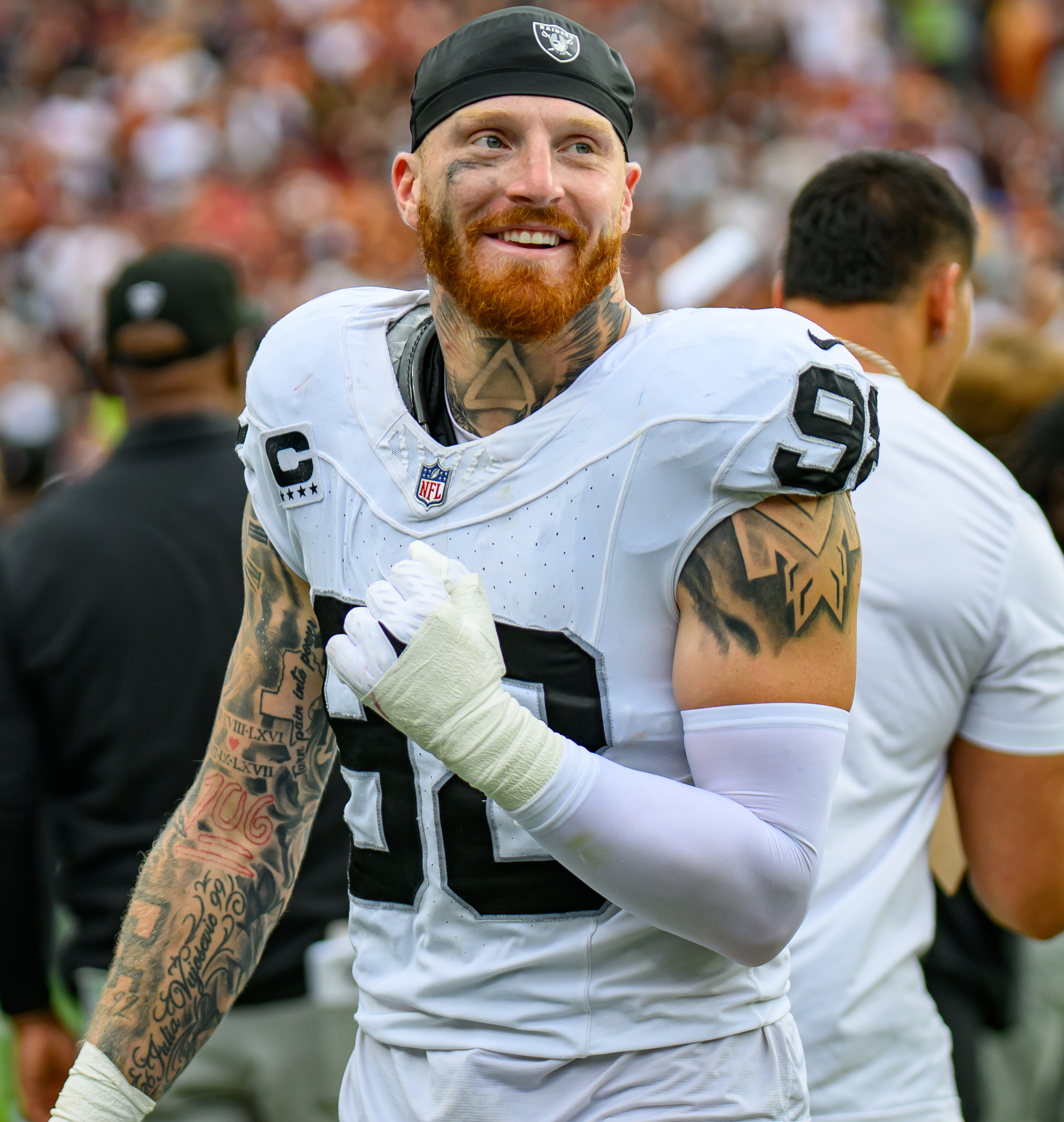
- Crosby with the Las Vegas Raiders in 2025

No. 98 – Las Vegas Raiders
- Position: Defensive end
- Roster status: Active

Personal information
- Born: August 22, 1997 (age 29); Lapeer, Michigan, U.S.
- Listed height: 6 ft 5 in (1.96 m)
- Listed weight: 255 lb (116 kg)

Career information
- High school: Colleyville Heritage (Colleyville, Texas)
- College: Eastern Michigan (2015–2018)
- NFL draft: 2019: 4th round, 106th overall pick

Career history

Playing
- Oakland / Las Vegas Raiders (2019–present)

Operations
- Eastern Michigan (2025–present) Assistant general manager

Awards and highlights
- 2× Second-team All-Pro (2021, 2023); 5× Pro Bowl (2021–2025); 2× First-team All-MAC (2017, 2018)

Career NFL statistics as of Week 10, 2026
- Total tackles: 473
- Sacks: 74.5
- Forced fumbles: 12
- Fumble recoveries: 4
- Pass deflections: 30
- Interceptions: 1
- Stats at Pro Football Reference

Maxx Robert Crosby (born August 22, 1997) is an American professional football defensive end for the Las Vegas Raiders of the National Football League (NFL). He played college football for the Eastern Michigan Eagles and was selected by the Oakland Raiders in the fourth round of the 2019 NFL draft.

== Early life ==
Crosby was born on August 22, 1997, in Lapeer, Michigan, and moved to Colleyville, Texas during adolescence. The spelling of his first name comes from how large (11 pounds 9 ounces (5.2 kg)) he was at birth. Crosby attended Colleyville Heritage High School in Colleyville, Texas.

Crosby's mother, Vera, is of Serbian and Albanian origin. When asked about his Serbian roots on his Instagram account, Crosby replied with najbolji smo, najjaci, Serbian for 'we are the best, [we are] the strongest'. He added an eagle emoticon, the Eagles being a nickname both for the Serbian national sports teams, and for their supporter groups.

== College career ==
Crosby played college football at Eastern Michigan from 2015 to 2018. Eastern Michigan was the only college football program to give him a scholarship offer. He was selected first-team All-MAC in 2017 and 2018.

Crosby was inducted into the school's Ring of Honor in 2023. In 2024, the playing field at Rynearson Stadium was renamed "Crosby Field" following a $1 million donation to the program from Crosby.

== Professional career ==
Pre-draft measurables
Height	Weight	Arm length	Hand span	Wingspan	40-yard dash	10-yard split	20-yard split	20-yard shuttle	Three-cone drill	Vertical jump	Broad jump	Bench press
6 ft 4 7/8 in (1.95 m)	255 lb (116 kg)	32 7/8 in (0.84 m)	9 3/4 in (0.25 m)	6 ft 9 in (2.06 m)	4.66 s	1.60 s	2.72 s	4.13 s	6.89 s	36.0 in (0.91 m)	10 ft 2 in (3.10 m)	18 reps
All values from NFL Combine/Pro Day

=== 2019 ===
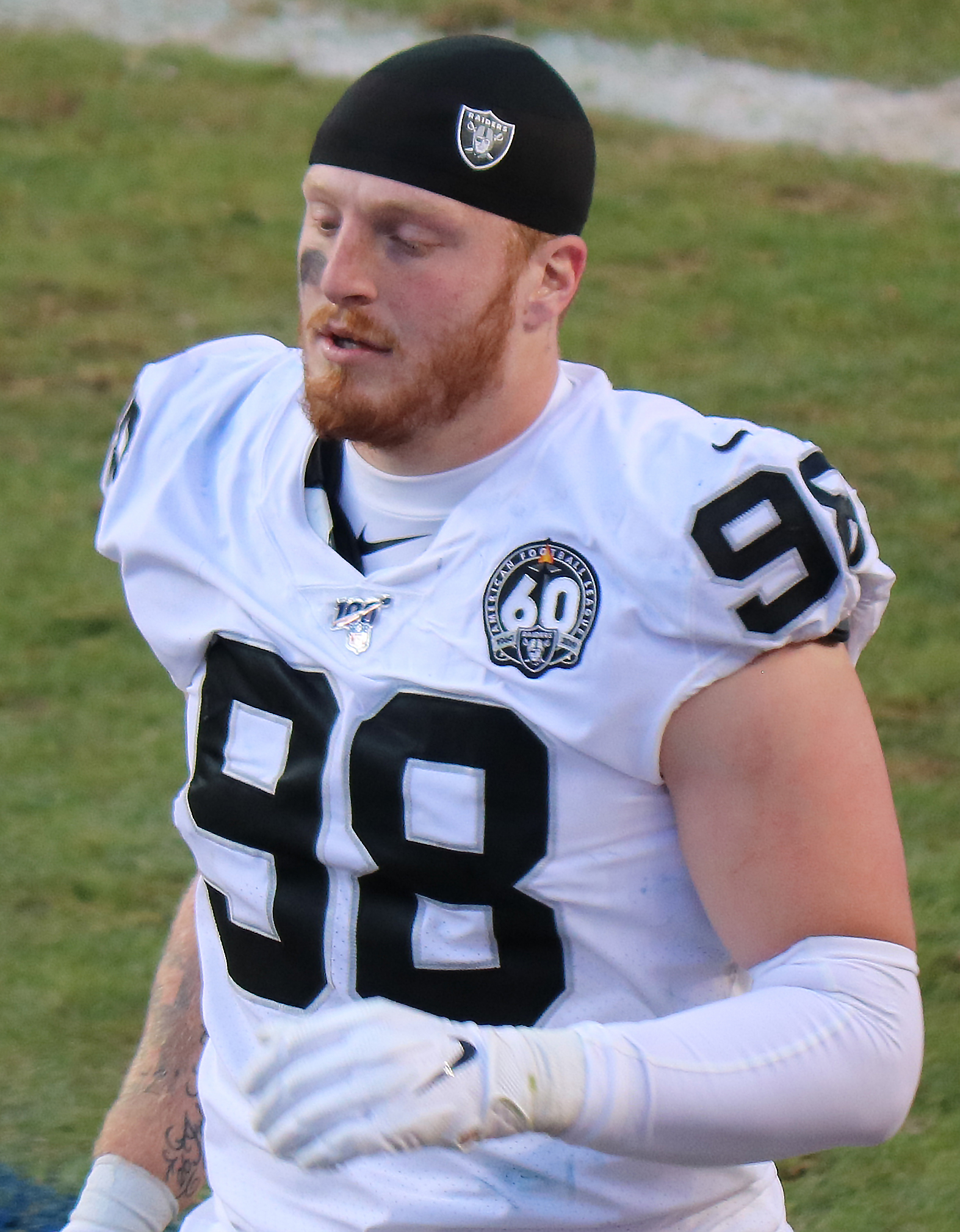
Crosby in 2019

Crosby was selected by the Oakland Raiders in the fourth round (106th overall) of the 2019 NFL draft. Crosby made his debut in the season opener against the Denver Broncos, recording six tackles in the 24–16 victory. During Week 5 against the Chicago Bears, Crosby recorded his first career sack on Chase Daniel in the 24–21 victory.

During Week 11 against the Cincinnati Bengals, Crosby sacked Ryan Finley four times, one of which was a strip sack that was recovered by teammate Maurice Hurst Jr. in their 17–10 victory. For his efforts, Crosby earned AFC Defensive Player of the Week. His four sacks were the most sacks made in a single game by a rookie in franchise history, as well as by a Raider in a single game since 2015, a year where Khalil Mack recorded five sacks while facing the Broncos. In the regular season finale against the Broncos, Crosby made 1.5 sacks on fellow rookie Drew Lock during the narrow 16–15 loss.

Crosby finished his rookie year with 10 sacks, 47 total tackles, four passes defended, and four forced fumbles.

=== 2020 ===
Crosby was placed on the reserve/COVID-19 list by the team on August 6, 2020, and was activated eight days later.

In Week 3 against the New England Patriots, Crosby recorded his first two sacks of the season on Cam Newton during the 36–20 loss. Two weeks later against the Kansas City Chiefs, Crosby sacked Patrick Mahomes once in the Raiders 40–32 win. In Week 17 against the Broncos, Crosby sacked Drew Lock once and blocked two field goals in a 32–31 win. Crosby was named the AFC Special Teams Player of the Week for his performance. He ended the season with seven sacks, 39 total tackles, and one pass defended.

=== 2021 ===
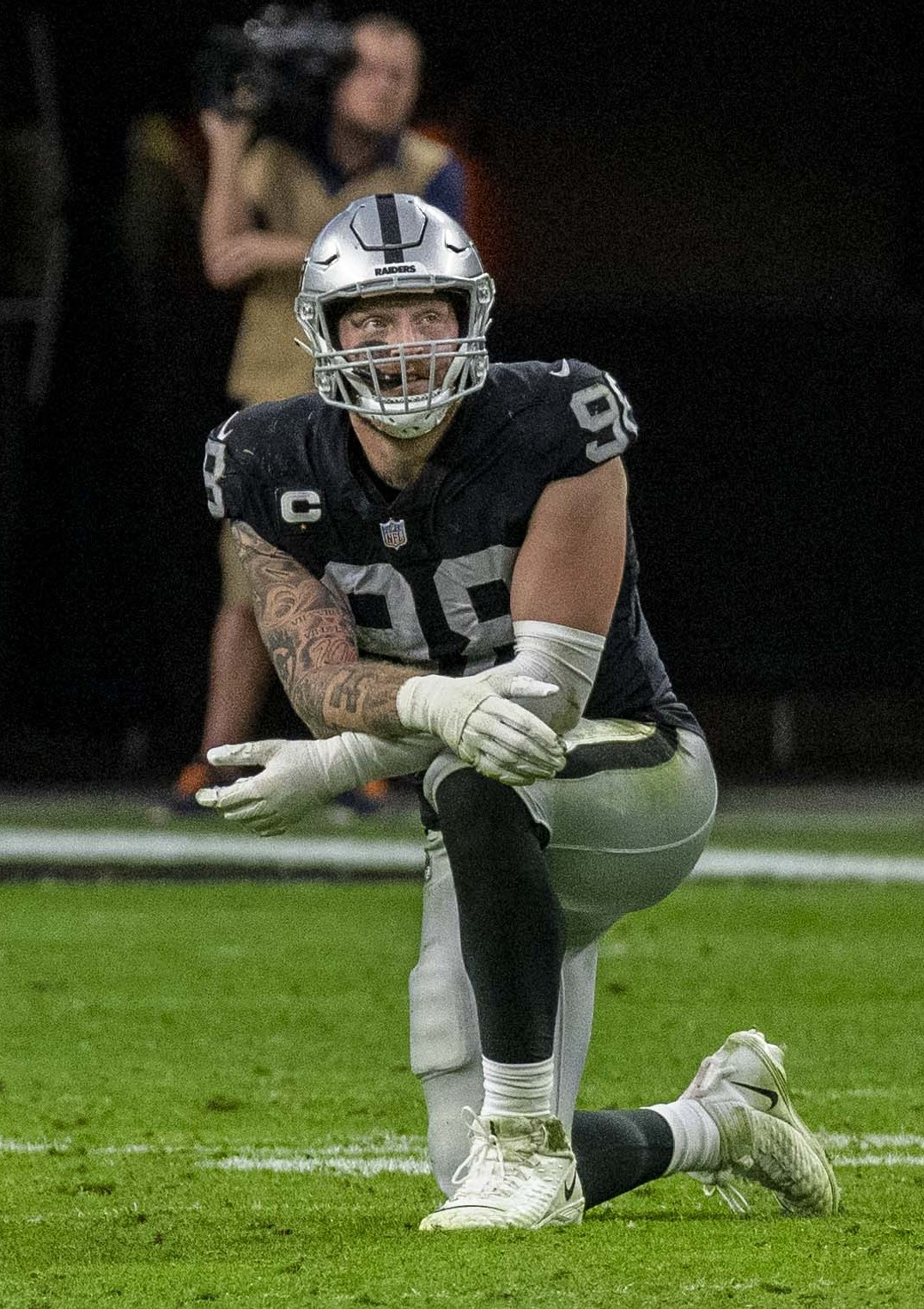
Crosby in 2021

During the season opener, Crosby recorded six tackles, two tackles for loss, and two sacks in a 33–27 overtime victory over the Baltimore Ravens. For his efforts, he earned his second career AFC Defensive Player of the Week honor. In Week 6, Crosby recorded six tackles, 12 pressures, and a season-high three sacks in a 34–24 win over the Broncos. In Week 18, Crosby earned his third AFC Defensive Player of the Week honor, which was his second of the season, for registering six tackles, three tackles for a loss, four quarterback hits, 11 pressures, two sacks and three passes defended against the Los Angeles Chargers.

Crosby would set a number of personal bests that season, which included passes defended (7) and a team-leading amount of quarterback hits (30), more than doubling his career highs at that point for both statistics. Crosby was named as a 2021 second-team All-Pro edge rusher by the Associated Press. He was ranked 59th by his fellow players on the NFL Top 100 Players of 2022.

=== 2022 ===
On March 11, 2022 (the second anniversary of becoming sober), Crosby signed a four-year, $98.98 million contract extension with the Raiders. He finished the season with a career-high 12.5 sacks, 89 total tackles, four passes defended, and three forced fumbles. Crosby led the NFL in tackles for loss with 22, and was named a 2022 Pro Bowler for his season performance. He was ranked 17th by his fellow players on the NFL Top 100 Players of 2023.

=== 2023 ===
In Week 5 against the Green Bay Packers, Crosby recorded four tackles for loss, the most in the league that week, and a sack and was named AFC Defensive Player of the Week for his performance. He finished the 2023 season with 14.5 sacks, 90 total tackles (55 solo), two passes defended, two forced fumbles, and a fumble recovery. He tied for the league lead with 23 total tackles for loss. He earned Pro Bowl honors for the 2023 season. He was ranked 10th by his fellow players on the NFL Top 100 Players of 2024.

=== 2024 ===
Crosby was named AFC Defensive Player of the Week for his two-sack game against the Baltimore Ravens in a 26–23 win in Week 2. In Week 4, Crosby had another two-sack game against the Denver Broncos.

Throughout the season, Crosby dealt with an ankle injury he sustained in Week 2. He was ruled out ahead of the Raiders' Week 15 matchup against the Atlanta Falcons and on December 14, it was announced that he was to undergo surgery for the injury, which ended his season. Crosby totaled 7.5 sacks and 20 quarterback hits that season, in addition to being tied with T. J. Watt for the league lead with 17 tackles for loss. Since 2019, Crosby's 324 pressures are 40 more than the next-closest player, Nick Bosa. He was ranked 22nd by his fellow players on the NFL Top 100 Players of 2025.

=== 2025 ===
On March 5, 2025, Crosby signed a three-year $106.5 million contract extension with $91.5 million guaranteed and an average salary of $35.5 million per year, making him the NFL's highest-paid non-quarterback at the time. He finished the season with 10 sacks, 73 tackles, two forced fumbles, six passes defensed, and his first career interception through 15 starts. Crosby led the team in sacks, tackles for loss, forced fumbles, and passes defensed and was fifth in tackles, en route to his fifth-straight Pro Bowl. On December 27, Crosby was placed on injured reserve by the Raiders, with reports suggesting offseason meniscus surgery as a possibility.

=== 2026 ===
On March 7, 2026, the Raiders and the Baltimore Ravens mutually agreed to trade Crosby to Baltimore in exchange for the Ravens' first-round selections in the 2026 and 2027 NFL draft before the NFL's new year on March 11. However, three days later, the Ravens backed out of the agreement after Crosby failed his physical, at which point the Ravens announced a deal for former Cincinnati Bengals player Trey Hendrickson.

== Career statistics ==
Legend
	Led the league
**Bold**	Career high

=== NFL ===
==== Regular season ====
Year	Team	Games		Tackles					Interceptions					Fumbles			
Year	Team	GP	GS	Cmb	Solo	Ast	Sck	TFL	Int	Yds	Lng	TD	PD	FF	FR	Yds	TD
2019	OAK	16	10	47	36	11	10.0	16	0	0	0	0	4	**4**	0	0	0
2020	LV	16	16	39	20	19	7.0	14	0	0	0	0	1	0	**1**	0	0
2021	LV	17	17	56	36	20	8.0	13	0	0	0	0	**7**	0	0	0	0
2022	LV	17	17	89	**58**	31	12.5	22	0	0	0	0	4	3	**1**	-3	0
2023	LV	17	17	**90**	55	**35**	**14.5**	23	0	0	0	0	2	2	**1**	0	0
2024	LV	12	12	45	28	17	7.5	17	0	0	0	0	5	0	0	0	0
2025	LV	15	15	73	45	28	10.0	**28**	**1**	**19**	**19**	0	6	2	0	0	0
2026	LV	10	10	34	18	16	5.0	9	0	0	0	0	1	1	1	0	0
Career		120	114	473	296	177	74.5	142	1	19	19	0	30	12	4	-3	0

==== Postseason ====
Year	Team	Games		Tackles					Interceptions					Fumbles			
Year	Team	GP	GS	Cmb	Solo	Ast	Sck	TFL	Int	Yds	Lng	TD	PD	FF	FR	Yds	TD
2021	LV	1	1	6	3	3	1.0	2	0	0	0	0	0	0	0	0	0

=== College ===
Year	Team	GP	Tackles					Interceptions					Fumbles			
Year	Team	GP	Cmb	Solo	Ast	Sck	TFL	Int	Yds	Lng	TD	PD	FF	FR	Yds	TD
2016	Eastern Michigan	13	35	11	24	1.5	5.5	0	0	0	0	1	0	1	0	0
2017	Eastern Michigan	12	57	**31**	26	**11.0**	16.5	0	0	0	0	1	**4**	**2**	**14**	**1**
2018	Eastern Michigan	12	**70**	**31**	**39**	7.5	**19.0**	**1**	**2**	**2**	**1**	**3**	**4**	1	0	0
Career		37	162	73	89	20.0	41.0	1	2	2	1	5	8	4	14	1

== Personal life ==
In March 2020, Crosby checked into rehab for alcoholism. In February 2022, he got engaged to Rachel Washburn, and they welcomed their first child on October 13, 2022. On March 4, 2023, Crosby and Washburn got married in Nevada.

In 2023, Crosby tattooed his chest with the words "Be Legendary" with pictures of Muhammad Ali, Kobe Bryant, Michael Jordan and an image of his daughter as an infant.

On April 14, 2025, Crosby was hired as the assistant general manager for the Eastern Michigan University football program, making him the first active NFL player to hold a college football personnel position.

Crosby is a minority shareholder in the Premier League soccer club Leeds United.
