= Cody Thompson (American football) =

American football player (born 1996)

Profile
- Position: Wide receiver

Personal information
- Born: January 11, 1996 (age 30); Huron, Ohio, U.S.
- Listed height: 6 ft 2 in (1.88 m)
- Listed weight: 205 lb (93 kg)

Career information
- High school: Huron
- College: Toledo (2014–2018)
- NFL draft: 2019: undrafted

Career history
- Kansas City Chiefs (2019)*; Seattle Seahawks (2019)*; Cincinnati Bengals (2019)*; Seattle Seahawks (2019–2023); Tampa Bay Buccaneers (2024)*
- * Offseason or practice squad member only

Awards and highlights
- 2× First-team All-MAC (2016, 2018)

Career NFL statistics
- Receptions: 1
- Receiving yards: 10
- Stats at Pro Football Reference

Cody James Thompson (born January 11, 1996) is an American professional football wide receiver. He played college football for the Toledo Rockets.

== College career ==
Thompson was a member of the Toledo Rockets for five seasons. He finished his collegiate career with 181 receptions for 3,312 yards and a school-record 30 touchdowns.

== Professional career ==
Pre-draft measurables
| Height | Weight | Arm length | Hand span | 40-yard dash | 10-yard split | 20-yard split | 20-yard shuttle | Three-cone drill | Vertical jump | Broad jump | Bench press |
|---|---|---|---|---|---|---|---|---|---|---|---|
| 6 ft 1 1/2 in (1.87 m) | 205 lb (93 kg) | 31 in (0.79 m) | 9 3/8 in (0.24 m) | 4.57 s | 1.61 s | 2.66 s | 4.03 s | 6.87 s | 38.5 in (0.98 m) | 9 ft 11 in (3.02 m) | 19 reps |
All values from NFL Combine

=== Kansas City Chiefs ===
Thompson signed with the Kansas City Chiefs as an undrafted free agent on May 6, 2019. He was waived during final roster cuts on August 31, 2019, but was signed to the team's practice squad on September 2. Thompson was released by the Chiefs on October 29, 2019.

=== Seattle Seahawks (first stint) ===
Thompson was signed by the Seattle Seahawks to their practice squad on October 31, 2019. He was released on November 5, 2019.

=== Cincinnati Bengals ===
Thompson was signed by the Cincinnati Bengals to their practice squad on November 19, 2019.

=== Seattle Seahawks (second stint) ===
Thompson was re-signed to the Seahawks practice squad on January 8, 2020. He signed a reserve/futures contract with the team on January 14, 2020. Thompson was waived on August 31, 2021, during final roster cuts and was re-signed to the practice squad the following day. He was elevated to the active roster on September 26, 2021, for the team's week 3 game against the Minnesota Vikings and made his NFL debut in the game. He signed a reserve/future contract with the Seahawks on January 10, 2022. He was placed on injured reserve on August 15, 2022.

Thompson made the Seahawks final roster in 2023 as a special teamer and backup wide receiver. He was waived on September 27, 2023 and re-signed to the practice squad. On October 2, 2023, Thompson was elevated to the active roster, and caught his first regular-season NFL pass—a 10-yard reception against the New York Giants. He returned to the practice squad on October 16, 2023. Two days later, on October 18, 2023, Thompson was promoted to the active roster again. He was waived on October 31, and re-signed to the practice squad. He was not signed to a reserve/future contract after the season and thus became a free agent upon the expiration of his practice squad contract.

=== Tampa Bay Buccaneers ===
On June 6, 2024, Thompson signed with the Tampa Bay Buccaneers. He was released during roster cuts on August 27, 2024 and signed with the team's practice squad the next day.
