= Kahale Warring =

American football player (born 1997)

No. 81, 47
- Position: Tight end

Personal information
- Born: March 23, 1997 (age 29); Sonora, California, U.S.
- Listed height: 6 ft 5 in (1.96 m)
- Listed weight: 252 lb (114 kg)

Career information
- High school: Sonora
- College: San Diego State (2015–2018)
- NFL draft: 2019: 3rd round, 86th overall pick

Career history
- Houston Texans (2019–2020); New England Patriots (2021)*; Indianapolis Colts (2021)*; Buffalo Bills (2021); Jacksonville Jaguars (2021); New Orleans Saints (2022)*; DC Defenders (2023)
- * Offseason or practice squad member only

Career NFL statistics
- Receptions: 3
- Receiving yards: 35
- Stats at Pro Football Reference

Kahalekuiokalani Michael Wodehouse Warring (kah-HALL-ay WHERE-ing) (born March 23, 1997) is an American former professional football player who was a tight end in the National Football League (NFL). He played college football for the San Diego State Aztecs and was selected by the Houston Texans in the third round of the 2019 NFL draft.

== Professional career ==
Pre-draft measurables
Height	Weight	Arm length	Hand span	40-yard dash	20-yard shuttle	Three-cone drill	Vertical jump	Broad jump	Bench press
6 ft 5 1/8 in (1.96 m)	252 lb (114 kg)	32 3/4 in (0.83 m)	9 3/4 in (0.25 m)	4.67 s	4.25 s	7.21 s	36.5 in (0.93 m)	10 ft 2 in (3.10 m)	19 reps
All values from NFL Combine

=== Houston Texans ===
Warring was selected by the Houston Texans in the third round (86th overall) of the 2019 NFL draft. On September 2, 2019, Warring was placed on injured reserve.

On September 15, 2020, Warring was placed on injured reserve. He was activated on November 23.

The Texans waived Warring on August 23, 2021.

=== New England Patriots ===
On August 24, 2021, Warring was claimed off waivers by the New England Patriots, but was waived just three days later.

=== Indianapolis Colts ===
On August 28, 2021, Warring was claimed off waivers by the Indianapolis Colts. He was waived by Indianapolis on August 31.

=== Buffalo Bills ===
On September 2, 2021, Warring was signed to the practice squad of the Buffalo Bills.

=== Jacksonville Jaguars ===
On December 28, 2021, Warring was signed by the Jacksonville Jaguars off the Bills practice squad.

=== New Orleans Saints ===
On May 24, 2022, Warring signed with the New Orleans Saints. He was waived by New Orleans on June 22.

=== DC Defenders ===
On November 17, 2022, Warring was selected by the DC Defenders of the XFL. He was not part of the roster after the 2024 UFL dispersal draft on January 15, 2024.
