= A. J. Ouellette =

American gridiron football player (born 1995)

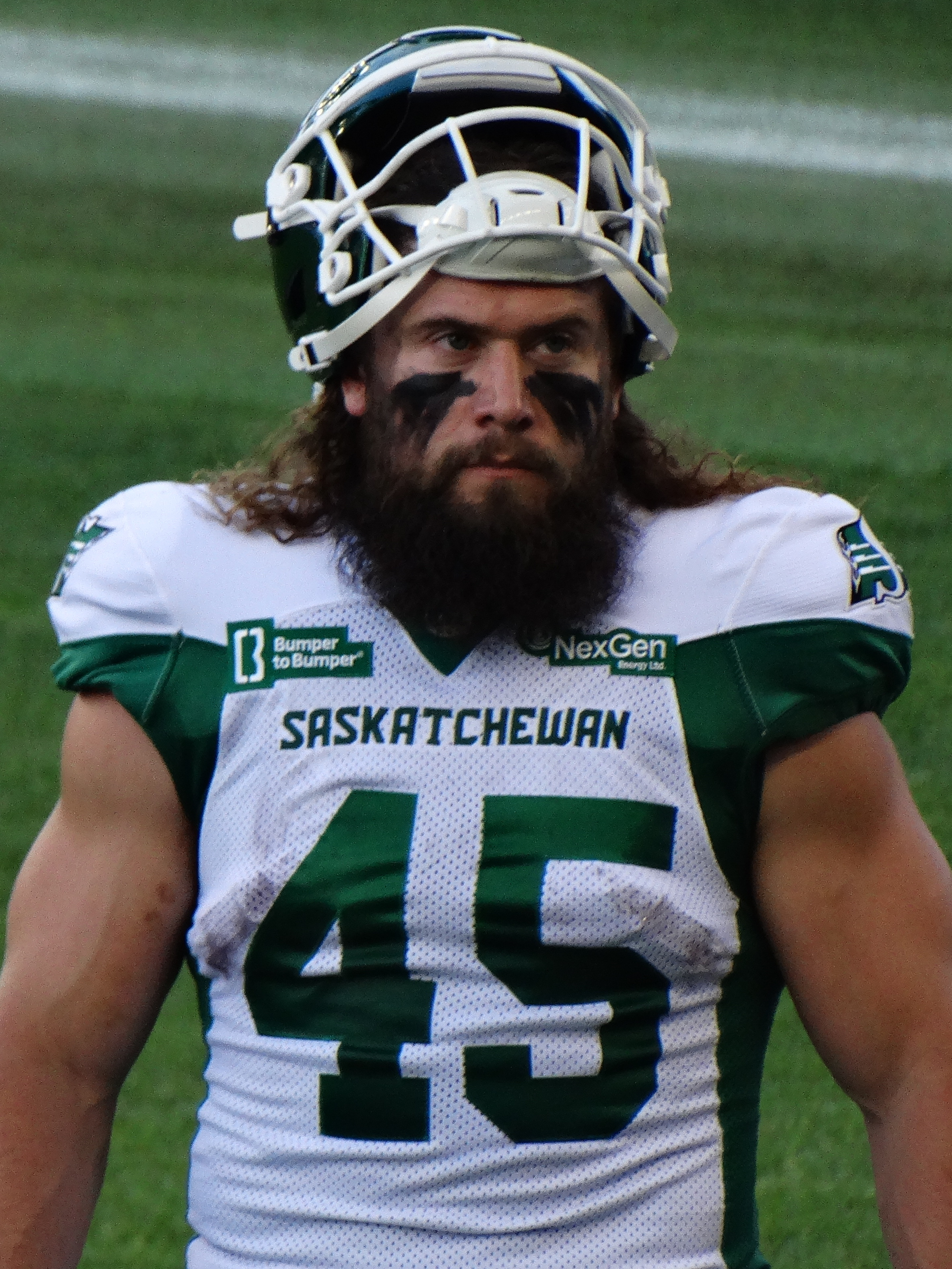
- Ouellette with the Saskatchewan Roughriders in 2025

No. 45 – Saskatchewan Roughriders
- Position: Running back
- Roster status: Active
- CFL status: American

Personal information
- Born: July 20, 1995 (age 31); Covington, Ohio, U.S.
- Listed height: 5 ft 9 in (1.75 m)
- Listed weight: 208 lb (94 kg)

Career information
- High school: Covington
- College: Ohio
- NFL draft: 2019: undrafted

Career history
- New Orleans Saints (2019)*; Cleveland Browns (2019)*; Toronto Argonauts (2019–2023); Saskatchewan Roughriders (2024–present)
- * Offseason or practice squad member only

Awards and highlights
- 2× Grey Cup champion (2022, 2025); 2× CFL East All-Star (2022, 2023); First-team All-MAC (2018); Second-team All-MAC (2017)

Career CFL statistics as of 2025
- Games played: 62
- Rushing attempts: 700
- Rushing yards: 3,562
- Rushing touchdowns: 21
- Stats at CFL.ca

A. J. Ouellette (born July 20, 1995) is an American professional football running back for the Saskatchewan Roughriders of the Canadian Football League (CFL). He has previously played for the Toronto Argonauts.

== College career ==
Ouellette played college football for the Ohio Bobcats from 2014 to 2018 while using a medical redshirt season in 2016 after suffering an injury in his first game that year. He finished his collegiate career having played in 50 games where he had 719 carries for 3,833 yards and 32 rushing touchdowns and 64 receptions for 516 yards and six receiving touchdowns.

== Professional career ==
Pre-draft measurables
Height	Weight	Arm length	Hand span	Wingspan	40-yard dash	10-yard split	20-yard split	20-yard shuttle	Three-cone drill	Vertical jump	Broad jump	Bench press
5 ft 9 3/8 in (1.76 m)	208 lb (94 kg)	28 7/8 in (0.73 m)	8 3/4 in (0.22 m)	5 ft 9 5/8 in (1.77 m)	4.56 s	1.57 s	2.56 s	4.09 s	6.84 s	36.5 in (0.93 m)	9 ft 9 in (2.97 m)	32 reps
All values from Pro Day

=== New Orleans Saints ===
On May 13, 2019, Ouellette signed with the New Orleans Saints. New Orleans waived Ouellette on May 28.

=== Cleveland Browns ===
On July 27, 2019, Ouellette signed with the Cleveland Browns. However, he was waived by Cleveland on August 31.

=== Toronto Argonauts ===
On September 17, 2019, it was announced that Ouellette had signed with the Toronto Argonauts. He played in his first career game on October 18, against the Montreal Alouettes where he had four carries for 20 yards. In the following game, Ouellette recorded his first career touchdown on a 15-yard pass from Dakota Prukop in a game against the Ottawa Redblacks on October 26. He played in three regular season games in 2019 where he had 23 carries for 114 yards and five receptions for 39 yards and one touchdown.

Ouellette did not play in 2020 due to the cancellation of the 2020 CFL season, but signed a contract extension with the Argonauts on December 15, 2020. In 2021, he played in just six games while spending time on the injured list and practice roster, but recorded 23 carries for 143 yards. Ouellette made his post-season debut, on December 5, 2021, after playing in the East Final where he had four carries for eight yards in the loss to the Hamilton Tiger-Cats.

Ouellette began the 2022 season on the injured list and played in just three of the team's first eight games as the back up running back. However, following a season-ending injury to the team's starting running back, Andrew Harris, Ouellette became the team's starting running back on August 20, 2022, where he had six carries for 18 yards and seven catches for 92 yards against the Calgary Stampeders. He scored his first career rushing touchdown on September 10, 2022, in the victory over the Ottawa Redblacks. Ouellette finished the season having played in 13 regular season games carrying the ball 98 times for 516 yards with two touchdowns. He also caught 38 passes for 350 yards and a score. On February 11, 2023, Ouellette and the Argos agree to a contract extension.

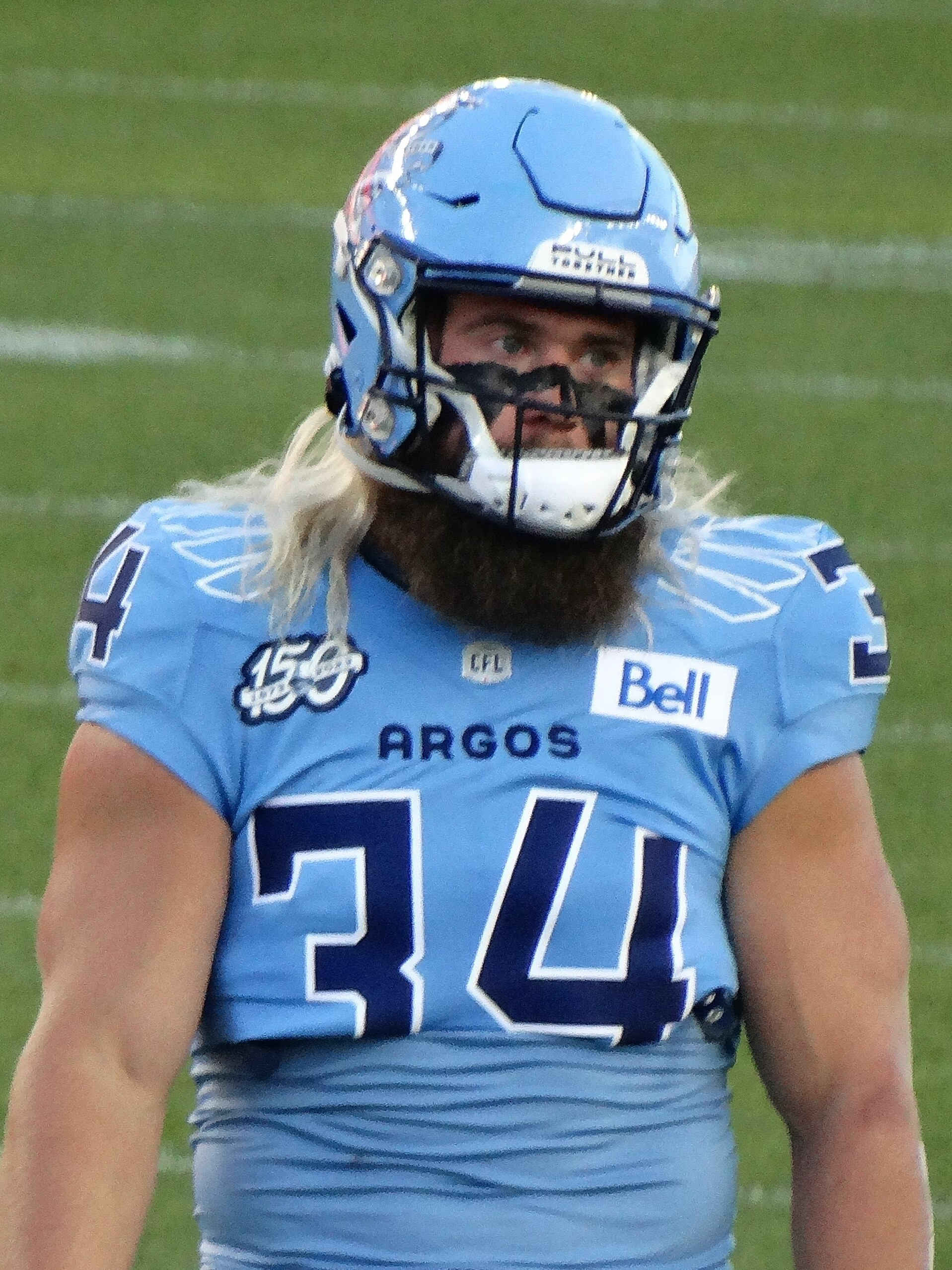
Ouellette with the Toronto Argonauts in 2023

In 2023, Ouellette entered the season as the starting running back as Harris was relegated to backup status. Ouellette played in 15 games, sitting out three as the Argonauts clinched the division early, where he recorded 178 carries for 1,009 yards and eight touchdowns along with 16 catches for 163 yards and two touchdowns. He was named a CFL East All-Star for the second consecutive season. In the following off-season, he became a free agent upon the expiry of his contract on February 13, 2024.

=== Saskatchewan Roughriders ===
On February 13, 2024, the Saskatchewan Roughriders announced that Ouellette had signed a two-year contract with the team. His 2024 season was limited due to injury as he played in just eight games, recording 130 carries for 558 rushing yards and three touchdowns along with 16 receptions for 147 yards.

== Career statistics ==
=== CFL ===
Year	Team	Games		Rushing					Receiving					Fumbles	
Year	Team	GP	GS	Att	Yds	Avg	Lng	TD	Rec	Yds	Avg	Lng	TD	Fum	Lost
2019	TOR	3	2	23	114	5.0	36	0	5	39	7.8	15	1	0	0
2020	TOR	Season cancelled													
2021	TOR	6	1	23	143	6.2	30	0	0	0	0.0	0	0	0	0
2022	TOR	13	9	98	516	5.3	34	2	38	350	9.2	28	1	1	1
2023	TOR	15	15	178	1,009	5.7	42	8	16	163	10.2	28	2	1	0
2024	SSK	8	8	130	558	4.3	27	3	16	147	9.2	19	0	2	1
2025	SSK	17	17	248	1,222	4.9	47	8	35	250	7.1	22	1	0	0
2026	SSK	8	8	108	501	4.6	18	1	13	83	6.4	17	0	0	0
Career		70	60	809	4,063	5.0	47	22	123	1,009	8.2	28	5	4	2

=== College ===
			Rushing				Receiving			
Year	Team	GP	Att	Yards	Avg	TDs	Rec	Yards	Avg	TDs
2014	Ohio	10	160	785	4.9	7	21	133	6.3	3
2015	Ohio	13	151	691	4.5	6	12	74	6.2	0
2016	Ohio	1	3	45	15.0	0	0	0	0	0
2017	Ohio	13	192	1,006	5.2	7	10	97	9.7	1
2018	Ohio	13	213	1,306	6.1	12	21	212	10.1	2
College totals		50	719	3,833	5.3	32	64	516	10.0	6

== Career highlights ==
CFL

- 2× Grey Cup champion (2022, 2025)
- 2× CFL East All-Star (2022, 2023)

College

- First-team All-MAC (2018)
- Second-team All-MAC (2017)
- Two-time team captain.
- Rushed for 1,000 yards in 2017 and 2018.
- Honored by the touchdown Club of Columbus, 2015.
- In 2015 lead team in rush attempts and rushing yards.
- in 2014 was two-time MAC East Offensive Player of the Week (Nov. 6 and 24).
- DXL Frisco Bowl Offensive MVP.

== Personal life ==
Ouellette was born to parents Phil and Jody Ouellette and has one older sister, Ashlie.
