= Jamal Davis II =

American gridiron football player (born 1995)

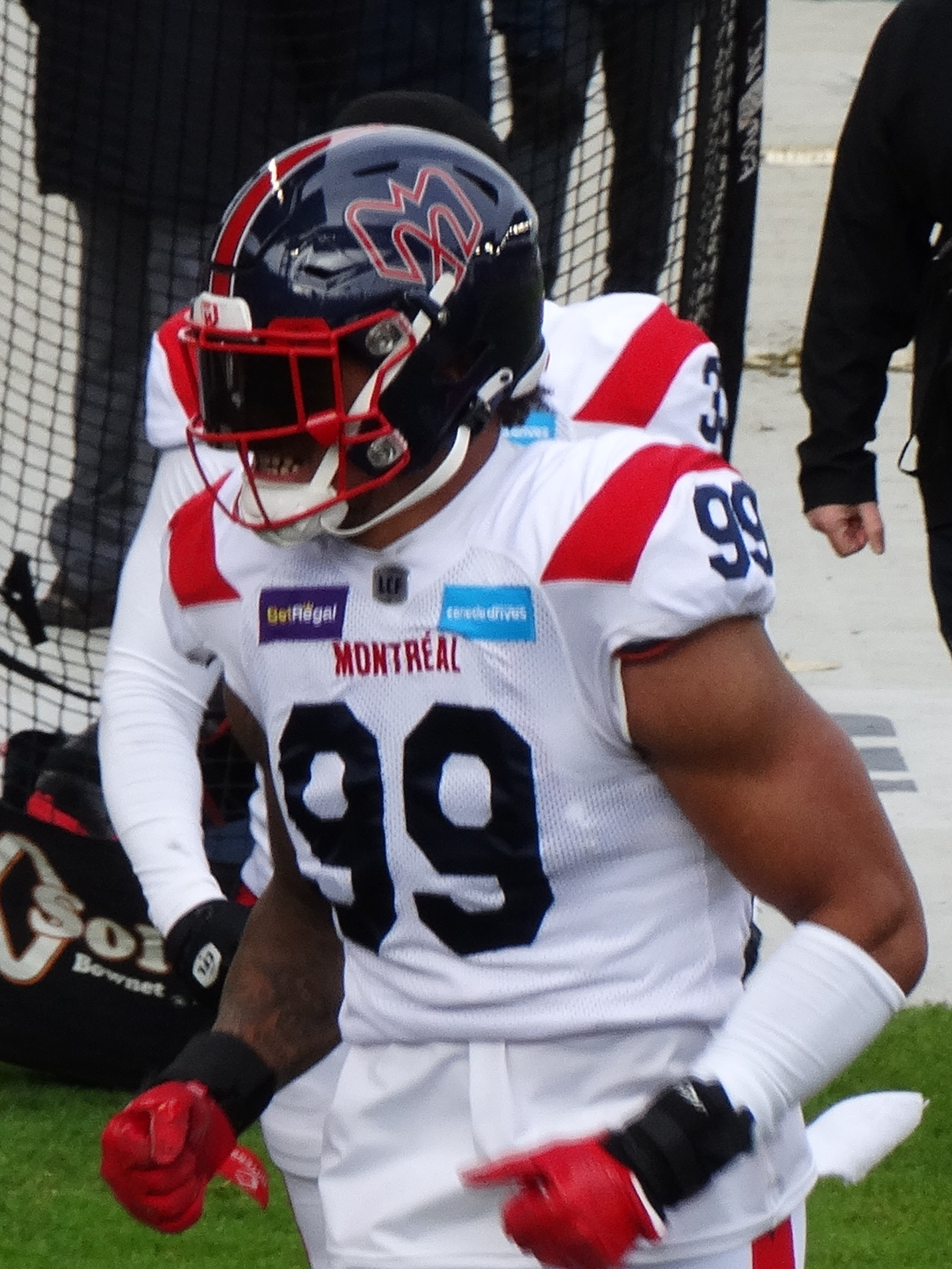
- Davis with the Montreal Alouettes in 2022

Profile
- Position: Defensive lineman

Personal information
- Born: July 9, 1995 (age 31); Canton, Ohio, U.S.
- Listed height: 6 ft 4 in (1.93 m)
- Listed weight: 250 lb (113 kg)

Career information
- High school: Canton McKinley (Canton, Ohio)
- College: Akron
- NFL draft: 2019: undrafted

Career history
- Houston Texans (2019)*; Indianapolis Colts (2019)*; Tennessee Titans (2019)*; Miami Dolphins (2019); Green Bay Packers (2020)*; Tennessee Titans (2020)*; Cleveland Browns (2020)*; Montreal Alouettes (2021); Los Angeles Chargers (2022)*; Montreal Alouettes (2022–2023); Hamilton Tiger-Cats (2023)
- * Offseason or practice squad member only

Awards and highlights
- Second-team All-MAC (2018)

Career NFL statistics
- Games played: 3
- Stats at Pro Football Reference

Career CFL statistics
- Games played: 15
- Total tackles: 27
- Sacks: 6.0
- Forced fumbles: 1
- Defensive touchdowns: 1
- Stats at CFL.ca

Jamal Davis II (born July 9, 1995) is an American professional football defensive lineman. He has been a member of seven teams in the National Football League (NFL); the Houston Texans, Indianapolis Colts, Tennessee Titans, Miami Dolphins, Green Bay Packers, Cleveland Browns and Los Angeles Chargers, and two teams in the Canadian Football League (CFL); the Montreal Alouettes and Hamilton Tiger-Cats. He played college football at the University of Akron.

== Early life ==
Davis attended Canton McKinley High School.

== College career ==
Davis played college football for the Akron Zips but sat out the 2016 season, as per NCAA transfer rules. Davis started in 12 games his junior season, earning him third-team All-MAC honors. He had 69 tackles, 15.5 for loss, and two sacks in 14 games (12 starts). Jamal participated in the 2019 NFL Combine.

== Professional career ==
=== Houston Texans ===
In April 2019, Davis signed as an undrafted free agent with the Houston Texans. On August 31, 2019, Davis was waived by the Texans.

=== Indianapolis Colts ===
Davis signed to the practice squad with the Indianapolis Colts on September 2, 2019. He was released on September 23, 2019.

=== Tennessee Titans (first stint) ===
Davis was signed to the practice squad of the Tennessee Titans on October 2, 2019.

=== Miami Dolphins ===
On December 10, 2019, Davis was signed to the Miami Dolphins' active roster off of the Titans practice squad. Davis made his NFL debut with the Dolphins and played in three games for the team in 2019. He was waived on April 20, 2020.

=== Green Bay Packers ===
Davis was claimed off waivers by the Green Bay Packers on April 21, 2020. He was waived on August 10, 2020.

=== Tennessee Titans (second stint) ===
On August 16, 2020, Davis signed with the Titans. He was waived on September 5, 2020.

=== Cleveland Browns ===
On December 2, 2020, Davis signed with the Cleveland Browns to the practice squad. He was released on December 8, 2020.

=== Montreal Alouettes (first stint) ===
Davis signed with the Montreal Alouettes of the Canadian Football League in January 2021. Davis made his debut with Montreal on September 3, 2021. He played in nine games for the Alouettes during the 2021 season and contributed with 17 defensive tackles, four quarterback sacks and a touchdown.

=== Los Angeles Chargers ===
On January 25, 2022, the Los Angeles Chargers signed Davis to a reserve/future contract. He was waived on August 30, 2022.

=== Montreal Alouettes (second stint) ===
On September 16, 2022, it was announced that Davis had re-signed with the Alouettes on a two-year contract. He played in six regular season games where he had ten defensive tackles, two sacks, and one forced fumble.

In 2023, Davis played in the team's first 14 games of the season where he recorded 22 defensive tackles, one special teams tackle, and three quarterback sacks. However, he was released on September 25, 2023.

=== Hamilton Tiger-Cats ===
On September 27, 2023, it was announced that Davis had signed with the Hamilton Tiger-Cats. He was released on May 10, 2024.
