= 2018 Frisco Bowl =

College football bowl game

2018 DXL Frisco Bowl
- 2nd Frisco Bowl
| San Diego State Aztecs | Ohio Bobcats |
| (7–5) | (8–4) |
| Mountain West | MAC |
| 0 | 27 |
| Head coach: Rocky Long | Head coach: Frank Solich |
| | 1 | 2 | 3 | 4 | Total |
|---|---|---|---|---|---|
| San Diego State | 0 | 0 | 0 | 0 | 0 |
| Ohio | 3 | 14 | 3 | 7 | 27 |
- Date: December 19, 2018
- Season: 2018
- Stadium: Toyota Stadium
- Location: Frisco, Texas
- MVP: A. J. Ouellette (RB, Ohio) & Evan Croutch (LB, Ohio)
- Favorite: Ohio by 3
- Referee: Jason Autrey (Sun Belt)
- Attendance: 11,029
- Payout: US$750,000

United States TV coverage
- Network: ESPN and Gameday Radio
- Announcers: Kevin Brown, Andre Ware and Kris Budden (ESPN); Brian Estridge, Landry Burdine, and Melanie Newman (Gameday Radio)

The 2018 Frisco Bowl was a college football bowl game played on December 19, 2018, with kickoff scheduled for 8:00 p.m. EST (7:00 p.m. local CST). It was the second edition of the Frisco Bowl, and one of the 2018–19 bowl games concluding the 2018 FBS football season. Sponsored by Destination XL Group, a retailer of men's big and tall apparel, the game was officially known as the DXL Frisco Bowl. In the game, the Ohio Bobcats shut out the San Diego State Aztecs, 27–0.

== Teams ==
Although the bowl has a tie-in with the American Athletic Conference, due to UCF receiving a bid to the Fiesta Bowl—a New Year's Six bowl—the conference was unable to provide a team. Thus, bowl organizers sought at-large teams, and announced a matchup of the Ohio Bobcats of the Mid-American Conference (MAC) against the San Diego State Aztecs of the Mountain West Conference. This was the first meeting between the two programs.

=== Ohio Bobcats ===
Ohio received and accepted a bid to the Frisco Bowl on December 2. The Bobcats entered the bowl with an 8–4 record (6–2 in conference), having won 5-of-6 to close their regular season.

=== San Diego State Aztecs ===
San Diego State received and accepted a bid to the Frisco Bowl on December 2. The Aztecs entered the bowl with a 7–5 record (4–4 in conference), having lost 4-of-5 to close their regular season.

== Game summary ==
=== Scoring summary ===
Scoring summary

| Quarter | Time | Drive | | | Team | Scoring information | Score | |
| Quarter | Time | Plays | Yards | TOP | Team | Scoring information | SDSU | OHIO |
|---|---|---|---|---|---|---|---|---|
| 1 | 2:20 | 12 | 66 | 6:50 | OHIO | 30-yard field goal by Louie Zervos | 0 | 3 |
| 2 | 7:57 | 15 | 72 | 6:55 | OHIO | Nathan Rourke 9-yard touchdown run, Louie Zervos kick good | 0 | 10 |
| 2 | 0:07 | 5 | 43 | 0:54 | OHIO | Nathan Rourke 11-yard touchdown run, Louie Zervos kick good | 0 | 17 |
| 3 | 11:33 | 7 | 66 | 3:27 | OHIO | 26-yard field goal by Louie Zervos | 0 | 20 |
| 4 | 12:41 | 4 | 56 | 2:02 | OHIO | Andrew Meyer 35-yard touchdown reception from Nathan Rourke, Louie Zervos kick good | 0 | 27 |
| "TOP" = time of possession. For other American football terms, see Glossary of American football. | | | | | | | 0 | 27 |

=== Statistics ===
| | 1 | 2 | 3 | 4 | Total |
|---|---|---|---|---|---|
| Aztecs | 0 | 0 | 0 | 0 | 0 |
| Bobcats | 3 | 14 | 3 | 7 | 27 |

| Statistics | SDSU | OHIO |
|---|---|---|
| First downs | 18 | 21 |
| Plays–yards | 62–287 | 62–421 |
| Rushes–yards | 36–153 | 40–215 |
| Passing yards | 134 | 206 |
| Passing: comp–att–int | 12–26–1 | 10–22–1 |
| Turnovers | | |
| Time of possession | 28:23 | 31:37 |

| Team | Category | Player | Statistics |
|---|---|---|---|
| San Diego State | Passing | Ryan Agnew | 11/24, 126 yds |
| San Diego State | Rushing | Juwan Washington | 19 car, 129 yds |
| San Diego State | Receiving | Isaiah Richardson | 3 rec, 58 yds |
| Ohio | Passing | Nathan Rourke | 10/22, 206 yds, 1 TD |
| Ohio | Rushing | A.J. Ouellette | 29 car, 164 yds |
| Ohio | Receiving | Papi White | 4 rec, 90 yds |
