= 2018 Eastern Michigan Eagles football team =

American college football season

2018 Eastern Michigan Eagles football

Camellia Bowl, L 21–23 vs. Georgia Southern
- Conference: Mid-American Conference
- West Division
- Record: 7–6 (5–3 MAC)
- Head coach: Chris Creighton (5th season)
- Offensive coordinator: Aaron Keen (2nd season)
- Offensive scheme: Spread
- Defensive coordinator: Neal Neathery (3rd season)
- Base defense: 4–2–5
- Home stadium: Rynearson Stadium

2018 Mid-American Conference football standings
	Conf.			Overall
Team	W		L	W		L
East Division
Buffalo x	7	–	1	10	–	4
Miami (OH)	6	–	2	6	–	6
Ohio	6	–	2	9	–	4
Akron	2	–	6	4	–	8
Bowling Green	2	–	6	3	–	9
Kent State	1	–	7	2	–	10
West Division
Northern Illinois x$	6	–	2	8	–	6
Western Michigan	5	–	3	7	–	6
Eastern Michigan	5	–	3	7	–	6
Toledo	5	–	3	7	–	6
Ball State	3	–	5	4	–	8
Central Michigan	0	–	8	1	–	11
Championship: Northern Illinois 30, Buffalo 29
$ – Conference champion; x – Division champion/co-champions

The 2018 Eastern Michigan Eagles football team represented Eastern Michigan University in the 2018 NCAA Division I FBS football season. They were led by fifth-year head coach Chris Creighton and played their home games at Rynearson Stadium in Ypsilanti, Michigan as members of the West Division of the Mid-American Conference. They finished the season 7–6, 5–3 in MAC play to finish in a three-way tie for second place in the West Division. They were invited to the Camellia Bowl where they lost to Georgia Southern.

== Preseason ==
=== Award watch lists ===
Listed in the order that they were released

Award	Player	Position	Year
Rimington Trophy	Dakota Tallman	C	SR
Chuck Bednarik Award	Maxx Crosby	DE	JR
Doak Walker Award	Ian Eriksen	RB	SR
Bronko Nagurski Trophy	Maxx Crosby	DE	JR
Outland Trophy	Jimmy Leatiota	OL	SR
Wuerffel Trophy	Jeremy Hickey	OL	SR
Ted Hendricks Award	Maxx Crosby	DE	JR

=== Preseason media poll ===
The MAC released their preseason media poll on July 24, 2018, with the Eagles predicted to finish in fourth place in the West Division.

== Schedule ==
Date	Time	Opponent	Site	TV	Result	Attendance
August 31	6:30 p.m.	Monmouth*	Rynearson Stadium; Ypsilanti, MI	ESPN+	W 51–17	14,357
September 8	12:00 p.m.	at Purdue*	Ross–Ade Stadium; West Lafayette, IN	BTN	W 20–19	47,661
September 15	6:00 p.m.	at Buffalo	University at Buffalo Stadium; Amherst, NY	ESPN+	L 28–35	18,384
September 22	10:30 p.m.	at San Diego State*	SDCCU Stadium; San Diego, CA	CBSSN	L 20–23 ^{OT}	30,898
September 29	6:00 p.m.	Northern Illinois	Rynearson Stadium; Ypsilanti, MI	ESPN+	L 23–26 ^{3OT}	14,779
October 6	12:00 p.m.	at Western Michigan	Waldo Stadium; Kalamazoo, MI (Michigan MAC Trophy)	ESPN+	L 24–27	24,282
October 13	12:00 p.m.	Toledo	Rynearson Stadium; Ypsilanti, MI	ESPN+	W 28–26	17,998
October 20	3:00 p.m.	at Ball State	Scheumann Stadium; Muncie, IN	ESPN+	W 42–20	14,022
October 27	12:00 p.m.	Army*	Rynearson Stadium; Ypsilanti, MI	CBSSN	L 22–37	22,627
November 3	12:00 p.m.	Central Michigan	Rynearson Stadium; Ypsilanti, MI (rivalry)	ESPN3	W 17–7	13,468
November 10	12:00 p.m.	Akron	Rynearson Stadium; Ypsilanti, MI	ESPN3	W 27–7	12,403
November 23	12:00 p.m.	at Kent State	Dix Stadium; Kent, OH	ESPN3	W 28–20	6,125
December 15	5:30 p.m.	vs. Georgia Southern*	Crampton Bowl; Montgomery, AL (Camellia Bowl)	ESPN	L 21–23	17,710
*Non-conference game; All times are in Eastern time

== Game summaries ==
=== Monmouth ===
	1	2	3	4	Total
Hawks	0	3	7	7	17
Eagles	13	17	14	7	51

=== At Purdue ===
	1	2	3	4	Total
Eagles	7	3	0	10	20
Boilermakers	6	6	0	7	19

=== At Buffalo ===
	1	2	3	4	Total
Eagles	0	21	0	7	28
Bulls	14	14	0	7	35

=== At San Diego State ===
	1	2	3	4	OT	Total
Eagles	3	7	7	3	0	20
Aztecs	3	14	0	3	3	23

=== Northern Illinois ===
	1	2	3	4	OT	2OT	3OT	Total
Huskies	3	10	0	0	7	0	6	26
Eagles	10	0	0	3	7	0	3	23

=== At Western Michigan ===
	1	2	3	4	Total
Eagles	0	10	7	7	24
Broncos	7	7	0	13	27

=== Toledo ===
	1	2	3	4	Total
Rockets	3	0	3	20	26
Eagles	21	7	0	0	28

=== At Ball State ===
	1	2	3	4	Total
Eagles	7	14	14	7	42
Cardinals	0	6	7	7	20

=== Army ===
	1	2	3	4	Total
Black Knights	3	13	7	14	37
Eagles	0	0	14	8	22

=== Central Michigan ===
	1	2	3	4	Total
Chippewas	0	7	0	0	7
Eagles	7	0	0	10	17

=== Akron ===
	1	2	3	4	Total
Zips	0	7	0	0	7
Eagles	7	0	0	17	24

=== At Kent State ===
	1	2	3	4	Total
Eagles	7	14	7	0	28
Golden Flashes	10	0	7	3	20

=== Vs. Georgia Southern (Camellia Bowl) ===
	1	2	3	4	Total
GASO Eagles	7	10	0	6	23
EMU Eagles	0	7	7	7	21

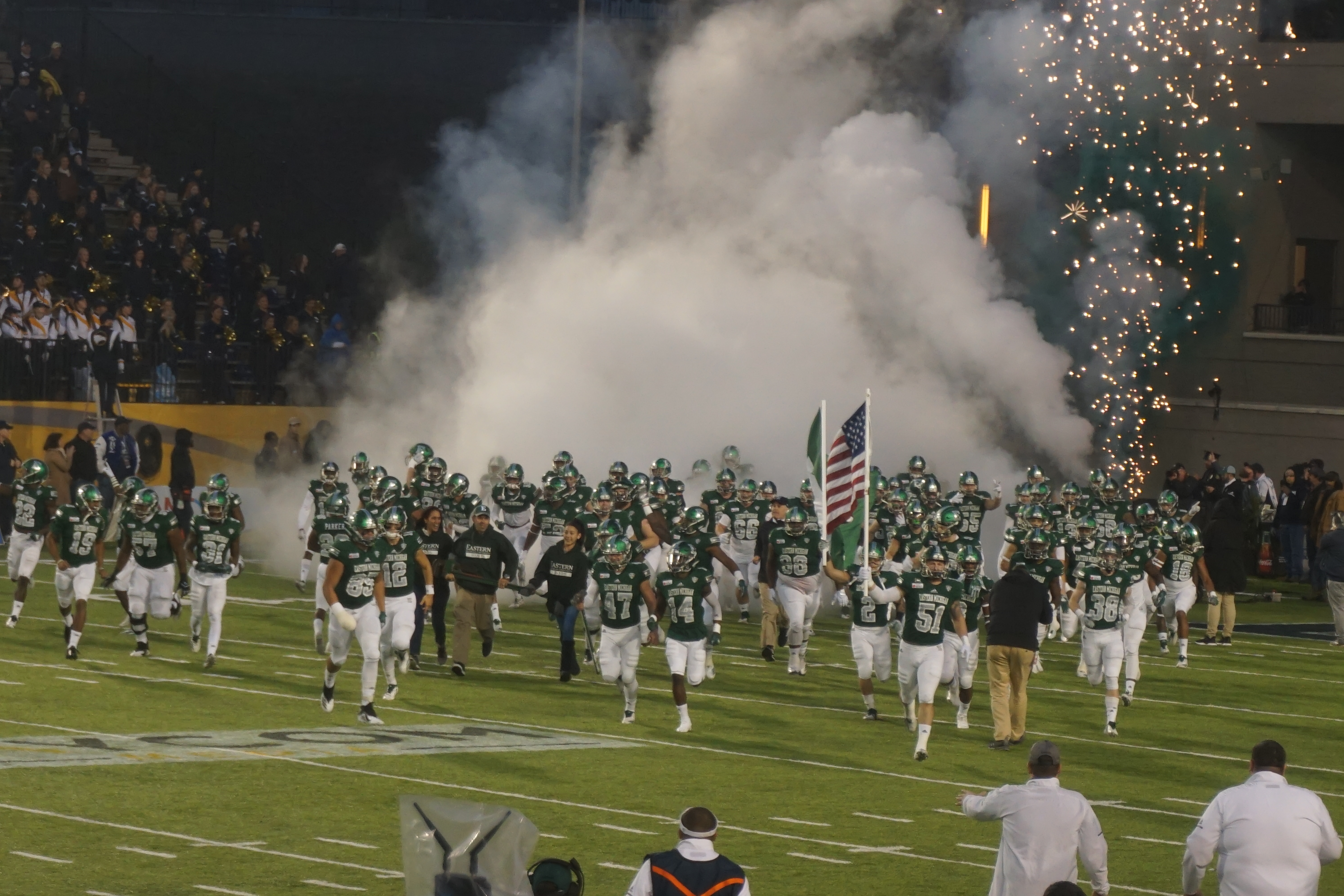
Eastern Michigan taking the field before the 2018 Camellia Bowl

== Roster ==
2018 Eastern Michigan Eagles football team roster
Players
Coaches
Offense

Pos.	#	Name	Class
QB	3	Aaron Jackson	Sr
RB	5	Shaq Vann	Sr
QB	7	Isaac Stiebeling	So
WR	8	Line Latu	Jr
QB	9	Mike Glass III	Jr
QB	10	Preston Hutchinson	Fr
WR	11	Isaac Holder	Jr
QB	12	Tyler Wiegers	Sr
WR	14	Carl Swopes	Fr
WR	15	Greg Jean	Fr
WR	16	Lemar Harris	Sr
WR	18	Keyan Marshall	So
QB	19	Jarius Grissom	Fr
RB	20	Blake Banham (C)	Sr
RB	22	Karmi Mackey	Fr
WR	23	Kevin Bradley	Fr
WR	24	Tanner Knue	Fr
RB	25	Ian Erikson	Sr
RB	26	Willie Parker	So
RB	27	Marc Hairston	Fr
RB	30	Bo Bell	Fr
RB	33	Breck Turner	Jr
RB	38	Dez Horne	Fr
WR	40	Eddie Daugherty	Sr
FB	43	Tyler Lyle	So
WR	44	Hassan Beydoun	Fr
FB	45	Ashton Clemons	Jr
OL	50	Sam Dervil	Sr
OL	54	Ka'John Armstrong	Sr
OL	56	Jimmy Leatiota	Sr
OL	57	Michael Smith	So
OL	60	Mike Van Hoeven	So
OL	62	Sidy Sow	Fr
OL	64	Thomas Major III	Jr
OL	65	Lucas Tesznar	Fr
OL	67	Jeremy Hickey	Sr
OL	68	Alex Howie	Fr
OL	69	Jake Donnellon	So
OL	70	Samari Saddler	Fr
OL	71	Marcellus Johnson	Fr
OL	74	Steve Nielsen	Jr
OL	75	Yannik Rohrschneider	Fr
OL	76	Jim Gregory	So
OL	77	Brian Dooley	Fr
OL	78	Dakota Tallman	Sr
WR	80	Dylan Drummond	Fr
WR	81	Quian Williams	Fr
TE	82	Gunnar Oakes	Fr
TE	83	Tre'Shawn Fields	Jr
WR	84	Logan Giordano	Fr
TE	85	Thomas Odukoya	Jr
WR	86	Michael Thompson	Jr
WR	87	Mathew Sexton	Jr
TE	88	Bryce Hemp	Jr
WR	89	Arthur Jackson III	Jr

Defense

Pos.	#	Name	Class
DB	1	Jalen Phelps	Jr
DB	3	Vince Calhoun	Jr
DB	4	Kevin McGill	Jr
LB	6	Jaylen Pickett	Sr
DB	7	Ikie Calderon	Sr
DB	9	Carthell Flowers	Fr
LB	10	Kobie Beltram	Jr
DB	12	Jeff Hubbard	So
DB	13	Justin Moody	Sr
DB	14	Ross Williams	Sr
DB	17	Robert Daniel	Fr
DB	21	Jordan Porter	So
DB	23	Blake Bogan	Fr
DB	24	Brody Hoying	Jr
DB	28	Isaiah Watson	Fr
DB	29	Timarcus Simpson	Fr
DB	30	Rich Jones	So
DB	31	Otis Jackson III	Fr
LB	32	Terry Myrick	So
LB	34	Konrad Dixon	Fr
DB	35	Freddie McGee III	So
DB	36	E. J. Williams	Fr
DB	37	Kymani Brown	So
DB	38	Joey Hiser	Fr
DB	39	Jerodd Vinces	Fr
DB	41	Russ Vaden IV	Fr
LB	42	Tyrone Neal	Jr
LB	48	Matthew Buschman	Fr
LB	49	Desean Boyd	Fr
LB	51	Kyle Rachwal	Sr
DL	52	Desmond Kelly	Jr
DL	55	Ville Valasti	Sr
DL	58	Carter Stagner	Fr
DL	59	Thad Abram	Jr
DL	61	Nicholas Gill	So
DL	63	Vince Boyd	Fr
DL	66	Rafe Reyes	Fr
DL	73	Ty Eddington	Jr
DL	90	Jeremiah Harris	Sr
DL	91	Clay Holford	Sr
DL	92	Maxx Crosby	Jr
DL	93	Mikey Haney	Fr
DL	94	Hunter Andrews	Jr
DL	95	Shawn Simeon	Jr
DL	96	Tyler LaBarbera	Sr
DL	97	C. J. Hunt	Fr
DL	98	Marqualin Scott	Jr
DL	99	Turan Rush	So

Special teams

Pos.	#	Name	Class
K	18	Paulie Fricano	Jr
K	21	Jesse Kelly	Sr
P	27	Vinnie Patteri	Fr
P	31	Jake Julien	So
P	34	Max Chaffee	Fr
K	44	Chad Ryland	Fr
LS	46	Steve Bird	Fr
LS	47	Drake Sutton	Jr

Head coach

- Chris Creighton

Coordinators/assistant coaches

- Aaron Keen (offensive coordinator / quarterbacks)
- Neal Neathery (defensive coordinator / linebackers)
- Todd Frakes (safeties / co-recruiting coordinator)
- Herb Haygood (wide receivers)
- Luke Meadows (run game coordinator / offensive line)
- Ben Needham (defensive line)
- Jay Nunez (special teams coordinator / co-recruiting coordinator)
- Jay Peterson (running backs)
- Fred Reed (cornerbacks)
- Rob Reeves (tight ends)
- Dylan Saccone (assistant ad for football operations)
- Brian Overholt (video coordinator)
- Casey Monahan (graduate assistant - defense)
- Tevyn Stevenson (graduate assistant - defense)
- Will Temizer (assistant recruiting coordinator)
- Jason Daniels (student football operations assistant)
- Travis Hensley (recruiting assistant)
- Keaton Kelly (offensive quality control)
- Robert McFadden III (offensive graduate assistant)
- Vontrell King-Williams (graduate assistant - recruiting quality control)
- Ryan Olson (offensive graduate assistant)

Legend

- (C) Team captain
- (S) Suspended
- (I) Ineligible
- Injured
- Redshirt

Roster
Last update: August 18, 2018

== After the season ==
The following Eagle was selected in the 2019 NFL draft after the season.

Round	Pick	Player	Position	NFL club
4	106	Maxx Crosby	Defensive end	Oakland Raiders
