= 2018 Ohio Bobcats football team =

American college football season

2018 Ohio Bobcats football

Frisco Bowl champion

Frisco Bowl, W 27–0 vs. San Diego State
- Conference: Mid-American Conference
- East Division
- Record: 9–4 (6–2 MAC)
- Head coach: Frank Solich (14th season)
- Offensive coordinator: Tim Albin (14th season)
- Offensive scheme: Spread option
- Co-defensive coordinators: Jim Burrow (14th season); Ron Collins (2nd season)
- Base defense: 4-3
- Captains: Kent Berger; Evan Croutch; Javon Hagan; Joe Lowry; A.J. Ouellette; Nathan Rourke; Kylan Nelson
- Home stadium: Peden Stadium

2018 Mid-American Conference football standings
	Conf.			Overall
Team	W		L	W		L
East Division
Buffalo x	7	–	1	10	–	4
Miami (OH)	6	–	2	6	–	6
Ohio	6	–	2	9	–	4
Akron	2	–	6	4	–	8
Bowling Green	2	–	6	3	–	9
Kent State	1	–	7	2	–	10
West Division
Northern Illinois x$	6	–	2	8	–	6
Western Michigan	5	–	3	7	–	6
Eastern Michigan	5	–	3	7	–	6
Toledo	5	–	3	7	–	6
Ball State	3	–	5	4	–	8
Central Michigan	0	–	8	1	–	11
Championship: Northern Illinois 30, Buffalo 29
$ – Conference champion; x – Division champion/co-champions

The 2018 Ohio Bobcats football team represented Ohio University in the 2018 NCAA Division I FBS football season. They were led by 14th-year head coach Frank Solich and played their home games at Peden Stadium in Athens, Ohio as members of the East Division of the Mid-American Conference. They finished the season 9–4, 6–2 in MAC play to finish in a tie for second place in the East division. They were invited to the Frisco Bowl where they defeated San Diego State.

== Preseason ==
=== Award watch lists ===
Listed in the order that they were released

Award	Player	Position	Year
Maxwell Award	Nathan Rourke	QB	JR
Jim Thorpe Award	Javon Hagan	S	JR
Outland Trophy	Joe Lowery	OL	SR
Lou Groza Award	Louis Zervos	K	JR
Manning Award	Nathan Rourke	QB	JR

=== Preseason media poll ===
The MAC released their preseason media poll on July 24, 2018, with the Bobcats predicted to finish as champions of the East Division.

== Schedule ==
Date	Time	Opponent	Site	TV	Result	Attendance
September 1	2:00 p.m.	Howard*	Peden Stadium; Athens, OH	ESPN+	W 38–32	18,275
September 15	4:15 p.m.	vs. Virginia*	Vanderbilt Stadium; Nashville, TN (Note: Moved from Scott Stadium in anticipation of Hurricane Florence.)	ESPN2	L 31–45	5,438
September 22	12:00 p.m.	at Cincinnati*	Nippert Stadium; Cincinnati, OH	ESPNU	L 30–34	35,220
September 29	2:00 p.m.	UMass*	Peden Stadium; Athens, OH	ESPN3	W 58–42	19,056
October 6	3:30 p.m.	at Kent State	Dix Stadium; Kent, OH	ESPN+	W 27–26	20,026
October 13	3:30 p.m.	at Northern Illinois	Huskie Stadium; DeKalb, IL	ESPN+	L 21–24	12,138
October 20	2:00 p.m.	Bowling Green^{†}	Peden Stadium; Athens, OH	ESPN3	W 49–14	19,492
October 25	7:00 p.m.	Ball State	Peden Stadium; Athens, OH	CBSSN	W 52–14	13,774
November 1	7:00 p.m.	at Western Michigan	Waldo Stadium; Kalamazoo, MI	ESPNU	W 59–14	11,935
November 7	7:00 p.m.	at Miami (OH)	Yager Stadium; Oxford, OH (Battle of the Bricks)	ESPNU	L 28–30	15,975
November 14	7:00 p.m.	Buffalo	Peden Stadium; Athens, OH	ESPN2	W 52–17	13,839
November 23	12:00 p.m.	Akron	Peden Stadium; Athens, OH	CBSSN	W 49–28	12,938
December 19	8:00 p.m.	vs. San Diego State*	Toyota Stadium; Frisco, TX (Frisco Bowl)	ESPN	W 27–0	11,029
*Non-conference game; ^{†}Homecoming; Rankings from AP Poll released prior to the game; All times are in Eastern time

== Game summaries ==
=== Howard ===
	1	2	3	4	Total
Bison	10	12	7	3	32
Bobcats	3	14	14	7	38

=== vs Virginia ===
	1	2	3	4	Total
Bobcats	7	14	7	3	31
Cavaliers	21	17	0	7	45

=== At Cincinnati ===
	1	2	3	4	Total
Bobcats	14	10	3	3	30
Bearcats	0	7	14	13	34

=== UMass ===
	1	2	3	4	Total
Minutemen	21	7	7	7	42
Bobcats	14	21	17	6	58

=== At Kent State ===
	1	2	3	4	Total
Bobcats	7	0	7	13	27
Golden Flashes	14	3	6	3	26

=== At Northern Illinois ===
	1	2	3	4	Total
Bobcats	0	7	14	0	21
Huskies	3	6	0	15	24

=== Bowling Green ===
	1	2	3	4	Total
Falcons	7	7	0	0	14
Bobcats	14	21	7	7	49

=== Ball State ===
	1	2	3	4	Total
Cardinals	7	0	0	7	14
Bobcats	0	31	21	0	52

=== At Western Michigan ===
	1	2	3	4	Total
Bobcats	21	24	7	7	59
Broncos	0	0	7	7	14

=== At Miami (OH) ===
	1	2	3	4	Total
Bobcats	7	0	7	14	28
RedHawks	7	21	0	2	30

=== Buffalo ===
	1	2	3	4	Total
Bulls	7	3	0	7	17
Bobcats	14	17	14	7	52

=== Akron ===
	1	2	3	4	Total
Zips	0	7	7	14	28
Bobcats	21	7	7	14	49

=== Vs. San Diego State (Frisco Bowl) ===
	1	2	3	4	Total
Aztecs	0	0	0	0	0
Bobcats	3	14	3	7	27
