= 2018 Boca Raton Bowl =

College football bowl game

2018 Cheribundi Boca Raton Bowl
- 5th Boca Raton Bowl
UAB Blazers	Northern Illinois Huskies
(10–3)	(8–5)
C–USA	MAC
37	13
Head coach: Bill Clark	Head coach: Rod Carey
	1	2	3	4	Total
UAB	10	17	10	0	37
Northern Illinois	7	3	3	0	13
- Date: December 18, 2018
- Season: 2018
- Stadium: FAU Stadium
- Location: Boca Raton, Florida
- MVP: Xavier Ubosi (WR, UAB) & Anthony Rush (NT, UAB)
- Favorite: UAB by 2.5
- Referee: Cal McNeill (Mountain West)
- Attendance: 22,614
- Payout: US$1,000,000

United States TV coverage
- Network: ESPN & ESPN Radio
- Announcers: Dave LaMont, Desmond Howard, Jonathan Vilma and Alyssa Lang (ESPN); Bill Rosinski, David Norrie and Ian Fitzsimmons (ESPN Radio)

The 2018 Boca Raton Bowl was a college football bowl game played on December 18, 2018, with kickoff scheduled for 7:00 p.m. EST. It was the fifth edition of the Boca Raton Bowl, and one of the 2018–19 bowl games concluding the 2018 FBS football season. Sponsored by the Cheribundi beverage company, the game is officially known as the Cheribundi Boca Raton Bowl.

The game featured the UAB Blazers, champions of Conference USA, and the Northern Illinois Huskies, champions of the Mid-American Conference. The Boca Raton Bowl was the first of three 2018–19 bowl games featuring two conference champions, along with the Orange Bowl and Rose Bowl. In just the second season since restarting its football program, the UAB Blazers defeated the Northern Illinois Huskies, 37–13, earning UAB their first-ever bowl victory.

== Teams ==
Based on conference tie-ins, the bowl could invite teams from the American Athletic Conference (AAC) or Conference USA (C–USA) and the Mid-American Conference (MAC). On December 2, bowl organizers announced that the participating teams would be the UAB Blazers from C–USA and the Northern Illinois Huskies from the MAC. This was the first meeting between the two programs.

=== UAB Blazers ===
UAB won the 2018 Conference USA Football Championship Game on December 1, then accepted a bid to the Boca Raton Bowl on December 2. The Blazers entered the bowl with a 10–3 record (7–1 in conference).

=== Northern Illinois Huskies ===
Northern Illinois won the 2018 MAC Championship Game on November 30, then accepted a bid to the Boca Raton Bowl on December 2. The Huskies entered the bowl with an 8–5 record (6–2 in conference). Northern Illinois became the first team to make a second appearance in the Boca Raton Bowl, having played in the inaugural edition of the bowl in 2014.

== Game summary ==
=== Scoring summary ===
Scoring summary

Quarter	Time	Drive			Team	Scoring information	Score	
Quarter	Time	Plays	Yards	TOP	Team	Scoring information	UAB	NIU
1	14:42	1	70	0:18	UAB	Xavier Ubosi 70-yard touchdown reception from Tyler Johnston III, Nick Vogel kick good	7	0
1	8:08	13	70	5:41	UAB	25-yard field goal by Nick Vogel	10	0
1	0:30	9	59	3:53	NIU	Tre Harbison 1-yard touchdown run, Andrew Gantz kick good	10	7
2	12:08	8	54	3:22	UAB	Spencer Brown 3-yard touchdown reception from Tyler Johnston III, Nick Vogel kick good	17	7
2	7:41	12	65	4:27	NIU	27-yard field goal by Andrew Gantz	17	10
2	5:11	7	75	2:30	UAB	Xavier Ubosi 46-yard touchdown reception from Tyler Johnston III, Nick Vogel kick good	24	10
2	0:00	6	13	2:21	UAB	35-yard field goal by Nick Vogel	27	10
3	7:38	16	71	7:22	NIU	21-yard field goal by Andrew Gantz	27	13
3	5:15	6	87	2:23	UAB	Xavier Ubosi 66-yard touchdown reception from Tyler Johnston III, Nick Vogel kick good	34	13
3	0:22	8	40	3:11	UAB	42-yard field goal by Nick Vogel	37	13
"TOP" = time of possession. For other American football terms, see Glossary of American football.							37	13

=== Statistics ===
	1	2	3	4	Total
Blazers	10	17	10	0	37
Huskies	7	3	3	0	13

Statistics	UAB	NIU
First downs	20	21
Plays–yards	65–476	73–281
Rushes–yards	36–103	44–102
Passing yards	373	179
Passing: comp–att–int	17–29–1	22–29–0
Turnovers		
Time of possession	28:08	31:52

Team	Category	Player	Statistics
UAB	Passing	Tyler Johnston III	17/29, 373 yds, 4 TD
UAB	Rushing	Spencer Brown	25 car, 78 yds
UAB	Receiving	Xavier Ubosi	7 rec, 227 yds, 3 TD
Northern Illinois	Passing	Marcus Childers	22/29, 179 yds
Northern Illinois	Rushing	Tre Harbison	18 car, 49 yds, 1 TD
Northern Illinois	Receiving	Spencer Tears	6 rec, 50 yds
