= 2018 Bowling Green Falcons football team =

American college football season

2018 Bowling Green Falcons football
- Conference: Mid-American Conference
- East Division
- Record: 3–9 (2–6 MAC)
- Head coach: Mike Jinks (3rd season; first 7 games); Carl Pelini (interim; remainder of season)
- Co-offensive coordinators: Kevin Kilmer (3rd season); Andy Padron (3rd season)
- Offensive scheme: Spread
- Defensive coordinator: Carl Pelini (1st season)
- Base defense: 4–2–5
- Home stadium: Doyt Perry Stadium

2018 Mid-American Conference football standings
	Conf.			Overall
Team	W		L	W		L
East Division
Buffalo x	7	–	1	10	–	4
Miami (OH)	6	–	2	6	–	6
Ohio	6	–	2	9	–	4
Akron	2	–	6	4	–	8
Bowling Green	2	–	6	3	–	9
Kent State	1	–	7	2	–	10
West Division
Northern Illinois x$	6	–	2	8	–	6
Western Michigan	5	–	3	7	–	6
Eastern Michigan	5	–	3	7	–	6
Toledo	5	–	3	7	–	6
Ball State	3	–	5	4	–	8
Central Michigan	0	–	8	1	–	11
Championship: Northern Illinois 30, Buffalo 29
$ – Conference champion; x – Division champion/co-champions

The 2018 Bowling Green Falcons football team represented Bowling Green State University in the 2018 NCAA Division I FBS football season. The Falcons were led by third-year head coach Mike Jinks for the first seven games until he was fired and replaced by interim head coach Carl Pelini. They played their home games at Doyt Perry Stadium in Bowling Green, Ohio as members of the East Division of the Mid-American Conference. They finished the season 3–9, 2–6 in MAC play to finish in a tie for fourth place in the East Division.

On November 28, 2018, the Falcons hired Boston College offensive coordinator Scot Loeffler as the new head coach.

== Preseason ==
=== Award watch lists ===
Listed in the order that they were released

Award	Player	Position	Year
Doak Walker Award	Andrew Clair	RB	SO
Fred Biletnikoff Award	Scotty Miller	WR	SR
Paul Hornung Award	Andrew Clair	RB/KR	SO
Earl Campbell Tyler Rose Award	Jarret Doege	QB	SO

=== Preseason media poll ===
The MAC released their preseason media poll on July 24, 2018, with the Falcons predicted to finish in fifth place in the East Division.

== Schedule ==
Date	Time	Opponent	Site	TV	Result	Attendance
September 1	8:00 p.m.	at No. 24 Oregon*	Autzen Stadium; Eugene, OR	P12N	L 24–58	50,112
September 8	6:00 p.m.	Maryland*	Doyt Perry Stadium; Bowling Green, OH	ESPN+	L 14–45	16,142
September 15	4:00 p.m.	Eastern Kentucky*	Doyt Perry Stadium; Bowling Green, OH	ESPN3	W 42–35	17,542
September 22	3:00 p.m.	Miami (OH)	Doyt Perry Stadium; Bowling Green, OH	ESPN+	L 23–38	14,380
September 29	12:00 p.m.	at Georgia Tech*	Bobby Dodd Stadium; Atlanta, GA	ACCRSN	L 17–63	40,740
October 6	3:30 p.m.	at Toledo	Glass Bowl; Toledo, OH (Battle of I-75 Trophy)	ESPN+	L 36–52	24,685
October 13	3:00 p.m.	Western Michigan^{†}	Doyt Perry Stadium; Bowling Green, OH	ESPN+	L 35–42	18,551
October 20	2:00 p.m.	at Ohio	Peden Stadium; Athens, OH	ESPN3	L 14–49	19,492
October 30	8:00 p.m.	Kent State	Doyt Perry Stadium; Bowling Green, OH (Anniversary Award)	ESPNU	L 28–35	13,131
November 10	3:00 p.m.	at Central Michigan	Kelly/Shorts Stadium; Mount Pleasant, MI	ESPN+	W 24–13	8,041
November 17	3:30 p.m.	at Akron	InfoCision Stadium; Akron, OH	ESPN3	W 21–6	17,742
November 23	12:00 p.m.	Buffalo	Doyt Perry Stadium; Bowling Green, OH	ESPNU	L 14–44	10,518
*Non-conference game; ^{†}Homecoming; Rankings from AP Poll released prior to the game; All times are in Eastern time

== Game summaries ==
=== At Oregon ===
	1	2	3	4	Total
Falcons	10	7	7	0	24
No. 24 Ducks	7	30	14	7	58

=== Maryland ===
	1	2	3	4	Total
Terrapins	0	10	7	28	45
Falcons	7	7	0	0	14

=== Eastern Kentucky ===
	1	2	3	4	Total
Colonels	14	7	14	0	35
Falcons	0	28	6	8	42

=== Miami (OH) ===
	1	2	3	4	Total
RedHawks	7	17	7	7	38
Falcons	0	3	0	20	23

=== At Georgia Tech ===
	1	2	3	4	Total
Falcons	3	7	7	0	17
Yellow Jackets	14	14	21	14	63

=== At Toledo ===
	1	2	3	4	Total
Falcons	7	14	7	8	36
Rockets	17	7	7	21	52

=== Western Michigan ===
	1	2	3	4	Total
Broncos	0	7	21	14	42
Falcons	7	14	7	7	35

=== At Ohio ===
	1	2	3	4	Total
Falcons	7	7	0	0	14
Bobcats	14	21	7	7	49

=== Kent State ===
	1	2	3	4	Total
Golden Flashes	7	7	7	14	35
Falcons	3	10	0	15	28

=== At Central Michigan ===
	1	2	3	4	Total
Falcons	0	0	17	7	24
Chippewas	7	6	0	0	13

=== At Akron ===
	1	2	3	4	Total
Falcons	0	7	7	7	21
Zips	3	3	0	0	6

=== Buffalo ===
	1	2	3	4	Total
Bulls	13	21	7	3	44
Falcons	7	0	0	7	14

== Players drafted into the NFL ==
Round	Pick	Player	Position	NFL Club
6	208	Scotty Miller	WR	Tampa Bay Buccaneers
