= 2018 Central Michigan Chippewas football team =

American college football season

2018 Central Michigan Chippewas football
- Conference: Mid-American Conference
- West Division
- Record: 1–11 (0–8 MAC)
- Head coach: John Bonamego (4th season)
- Offensive coordinator: Chris Ostrowsky (2nd season)
- Defensive coordinator: Greg Colby (4th season)
- Home stadium: Kelly/Shorts Stadium

2018 Mid-American Conference football standings
	Conf.			Overall
Team	W		L	W		L
East Division
Buffalo x	7	–	1	10	–	4
Miami (OH)	6	–	2	6	–	6
Ohio	6	–	2	9	–	4
Akron	2	–	6	4	–	8
Bowling Green	2	–	6	3	–	9
Kent State	1	–	7	2	–	10
West Division
Northern Illinois x$	6	–	2	8	–	6
Western Michigan	5	–	3	7	–	6
Eastern Michigan	5	–	3	7	–	6
Toledo	5	–	3	7	–	6
Ball State	3	–	5	4	–	8
Central Michigan	0	–	8	1	–	11
Championship: Northern Illinois 30, Buffalo 29
$ – Conference champion; x – Division champion/co-champions

The 2018 Central Michigan Chippewas football team represented Central Michigan University in the 2018 NCAA Division I FBS football season. They were led by fourth-year head coach John Bonamego and played their home games at Kelly/Shorts Stadium as members of the West Division of the Mid-American Conference. They finished the season 1–11, 0–8 in MAC play to finish in last place in the West Division.

On November 23, following a loss to Toledo, head coach John Bonamego was fired. He finished at Central Michigan with a four-year record of 22–29. On December 2, the school hired Michigan wide receivers coach Jim McElwain, who previously served as head coach at Colorado State and Florida.

== Preseason ==
=== Award watch lists ===
Listed in the order that they were released

Award	Player	Position	Year
Wuerffel Trophy	Mitch Stanitzek	DL	SR

=== Preseason media poll ===
The MAC released their preseason media poll on July 24, 2018, with the Chippewas predicted to finish in fifth place in the West Division.

== Schedule ==
Date	Time	Opponent	Site	TV	Result	Attendance
September 1	3:30 p.m.	at Kentucky*	Kroger Field; Lexington, KY	ESPNU	L 20–35	49,138
September 8	3:00 p.m.	Kansas*	Kelly/Shorts Stadium; Mount Pleasant, MI	ESPN+	L 7–31	18,127
September 15	3:30 p.m.	at Northern Illinois	Huskie Stadium; DeKalb, IL	ESPN+	L 16–24	12,354
September 22	3:00 p.m.	No. 13 (FCS) Maine*	Kelly/Shorts Stadium; Mount Pleasant, MI	ESPN+	W 17–5	16,474
September 29	12:00 p.m.	at No. 21 Michigan State*	Spartan Stadium; East Lansing, MI	FS1	L 20–31	73,752
October 6	12:00 p.m.	Buffalo^{†}	Kelly/Shorts Stadium; Mount Pleasant, MI	CBSSN	L 24–34	14,044
October 13	3:00 p.m.	Ball State	Kelly/Shorts Stadium; Mount Pleasant, MI	ESPN3	L 23–24	10,255
October 20	3:30 p.m.	Western Michigan	Kelly/Shorts Stadium; Mount Pleasant, MI (rivalry)	ESPN+	L 10–35	10,097
October 27	12:00 p.m.	at Akron	InfoCision Stadium; Akron, OH	ESPN3	L 10–17	17,582
November 3	12:00 p.m.	at Eastern Michigan	Rynearson Stadium; Ypsilanti, MI (rivalry)	ESPN3	L 7–17	13,468
November 10	3:00 p.m.	Bowling Green	Kelly/Shorts Stadium; Mount Pleasant, MI	ESPN+	L 13–24	8,041
November 23	12:00 p.m.	at Toledo	Glass Bowl; Toledo, OH	ESPN3	L 13–51	15,521
*Non-conference game; ^{†}Homecoming; Rankings from AP Poll released prior to the game; All times are in Eastern time

== Game summaries ==
=== At Kentucky ===
	1	2	3	4	Total
Chippewas	3	17	0	0	20
Wildcats	7	14	7	7	35

=== Kansas ===
	1	2	3	4	Total
Jayhawks	0	7	14	10	31
Chippewas	0	0	7	0	7

=== At Northern Illinois ===
	1	2	3	4	Total
Chippewas	0	3	7	6	16
Huskies	0	14	7	3	24

=== Maine ===
	1	2	3	4	Total
No. 13 (FCS) Black Bears	0	0	3	2	5
Chippewas	0	10	0	7	17

=== At Michigan State ===
	1	2	3	4	Total
Chippewas	3	0	0	17	20
No. 21 Spartans	0	17	14	0	31

=== Buffalo ===
	1	2	3	4	Total
Bulls	7	10	7	10	34
Chippewas	3	0	14	7	24

=== Ball State ===
	1	2	3	4	Total
Cardinals	0	7	0	17	24
Chippewas	3	17	0	3	23

=== Western Michigan ===
	1	2	3	4	Total
Broncos	7	14	0	14	35
Chippewas	0	0	10	0	10

=== At Akron ===
	1	2	3	4	Total
Chippewas	0	0	10	0	10
Zips	7	10	0	0	17

=== At Eastern Michigan ===
	1	2	3	4	Total
Chippewas	0	7	0	0	7
Eagles	7	0	0	10	17

=== Bowling Green ===
	1	2	3	4	Total
Falcons	0	0	17	7	24
Chippewas	7	6	0	0	13

=== Toledo ===
	1	2	3	4	Total
Chippewas	0	0	0	13	13
Rockets	14	10	13	14	51

== Players drafted into the NFL ==
Round	Pick	Player	Position	NFL Club
2	39	Sean Murphy-Bunting	CB	Tampa Bay Buccaneers
6	195	Xavier Crawford	CB	Houston Texans
