= 2018 Ball State Cardinals football team =

American college football season

2018 Ball State Cardinals football
- Conference: Mid-American Conference
- West Division
- Record: 4–8 (3–5 MAC)
- Head coach: Mike Neu (3rd season)
- Offensive coordinator: Joey Lynch (5th season)
- Offensive scheme: Spread
- Defensive coordinator: David Elson (2nd season)
- Base defense: 3–4
- Home stadium: Scheumann Stadium

2018 Mid-American Conference football standings
	Conf.			Overall
Team	W		L	W		L
East Division
Buffalo x	7	–	1	10	–	4
Miami (OH)	6	–	2	6	–	6
Ohio	6	–	2	9	–	4
Akron	2	–	6	4	–	8
Bowling Green	2	–	6	3	–	9
Kent State	1	–	7	2	–	10
West Division
Northern Illinois x$	6	–	2	8	–	6
Western Michigan	5	–	3	7	–	6
Eastern Michigan	5	–	3	7	–	6
Toledo	5	–	3	7	–	6
Ball State	3	–	5	4	–	8
Central Michigan	0	–	8	1	–	11
Championship: Northern Illinois 30, Buffalo 29
$ – Conference champion; x – Division champion/co-champions

The 2018 Ball State Cardinals football team represented Ball State University in the 2018 NCAA Division I FBS football season. They were led by third-year head coach Mike Neu and played their home games at Scheumann Stadium in Muncie, Indiana as members of the West Division of the Mid-American Conference. They finished the season 4–8, 3–5 in MAC play to finish in fifth place in the West Division.

== Preseason ==
=== Award watch lists ===
Listed in the order that they were released

Award	Player	Position	Year
Rimington Trophy	Andrew Poenitsch	C	JR
Maxwell Award	James Gilbert	RB	JR
Fred Biletnikoff Award	Justin Hall	WR	SO
John Mackey Award	Nolan Givan	TE	SO
Paul Hornung Award	Malik Dunner	RB/KR	JR
Wuerffel Trophy	Riley Neal	QB	SR

=== Preseason media poll ===
The MAC released their preseason media poll on July 24, 2018, with the Cardinals predicted to finish in last place in the West Division.

== Schedule ==
Date	Time	Opponent	Site	TV	Result	Attendance
August 30	7:00 p.m.	Central Connecticut*	Scheumann Stadium; Muncie, IN	ESPN+	W 42–6	9,801
September 8	3:30 p.m.	at No. 8 Notre Dame*	Notre Dame Stadium; South Bend, IN	NBC	L 16–24	77,622
September 15	12:00 p.m.	at Indiana*	Memorial Stadium; Bloomington, IN	BTN	L 10–38	40,240
September 22	3:00 p.m.	Western Kentucky*	Scheumann Stadium; Muncie, IN	ESPN3	L 20–28	15,873
September 29	3:00 p.m.	Kent State	Scheumann Stadium; Muncie, IN	ESPN+	W 52–24	9,367
October 6	3:00 p.m.	Northern Illinois	Scheumann Stadium; Muncie, IN (Bronze Stalk Trophy)	ESPN3	L 16–24	7,159
October 13	3:00 p.m.	at Central Michigan	Kelly/Shorts Stadium; Mount Pleasant, MI	ESPN3	W 24–23	10,255
October 20	3:00 p.m.	Eastern Michigan^{†}	Scheumann Stadium; Muncie, IN	ESPN+	L 20–42	14,022
October 25	7:00 p.m.	at Ohio	Peden Stadium; Athens, OH	CBSSN	L 14–52	13,774
October 31	7:30 p.m.	at Toledo	Glass Bowl; Toledo, OH	ESPN2	L 13–45	15,214
November 13	6:00 p.m.	Western Michigan	Scheumann Stadium; Muncie, IN	ESPN2	W 42–41 ^{OT}	5,503
November 20	7:00 p.m.	at Miami (OH)	Yager Stadium; Oxford, OH	ESPNU/ESPN+	L 21–42	17,639
*Non-conference game; ^{†}Homecoming; Rankings from AP Poll released prior to the game; All times are in Eastern time

== Roster ==
2018 Ball State Cardinals football team roster
Players
Coaches
Offense

Pos.	#	Name	Class
OL	55	Chris Beech	So
OL	68	T. J. Beltavski	So
WR	37	RJ Benkelman	Fr
OL	62	Curtis Blackwell	So
QB	10	Elliot Charlebois	Fr
WR	1	Antwan Davis	Jr
TE	82	Keidren Davis	So
RB	4	Malik Dunner	Jr
WR	83	Luke Endsley	So
RB	30	Tye Evans	Fr
WR	25	Jaylen Flemmons	Fr
WR	80	Justin Gibbs	Fr
RB	34	James Gilbert	Jr
WR	13	Brennan Gillis	Jr
TE	88	Nolan Givan	So
TE	41	Bryson Haft	Fr
WR	12	Justin Hall	So
WR	84	Trevor Hohlt	Fr
QB	15	Riley Neal	Jr
WR	14	Khalil Newton	So
TE	43	Wes Obermeier	Fr
QB	18	John Paddock	Fr
OL	75	Danny Pinter	Jr
QB	9	Drew Plitt	So
OL	64	Andrew Poenitsch	Jr
RB	39	Rashaad Poindexter	So
WR	19	Devin Reece	Sr
OL	71	Zac Ricketts	Jr
FB	8	Cody Rudy	So

Defense

Pos.	#	Name	Class
OLB	51	Christian Albright	So
S	10	Lamar Anderson	Jr
S	23	Brett Anderson II	So
OLB	44	Brock Burns	Fr
DB	41	Vince Campbell	Fr
OLB	98	Mitchell Carter	Fr
CB	36	Hunter Causey	Fr
S	5	Bryce Cosby	So
DT	42	Chris Crumb	Jr
OLB	27	Jimmy Daw	Fr
ILB	47	Sid Fox	Fr
CB	38	Nik Giles	Jr
ILB	50	Hank Grenda	Fr
DE	56	Shannon Hall	Jr
DE	90	Sean Hammonds Jr.	Jr
S	20	Myles Hannah	Fr
OLB	54	Sam Helm	Fr
CB	15	Verenzo Holmes Jr.	So
CB	16	Tyler Potts	Fr
ILB	37	Shahid Reece	Fr
OLB	33	Michael Robinson Jr.	So
DL	55	Tuni Ropati	Jr
OLB	58	Davion Tyson	Fr
ILB	57	Trey Uetrecht	Fr
DL	96	Tre Underwood	So
CB	25	Amechi Uzodinma II	Fr
S	31	Romero Wade	Jr
CB	7	Marc Walton	Sr
ILB	2	Jacob White	Jr
OLB	11	Ray Wilborn	Jr
OLB	13	Jordan Williams	Fr

Special teams

Pos.	#	Name	Class
LS	45	Joseph Greenwood	So
K	22	Morgan Hagee	Sr
K	97	Ryan Rimmler	Jr

Head coach

- Mike Neu

Coordinators/assistant coaches

Legend

- (C) Team captain
- (S) Suspended
- (I) Ineligible
- Injured
- Redshirt

Roster

== Game summaries ==
=== Central Connecticut ===
	1	2	3	4	Total
Blue Devils	0	0	0	6	6
Cardinals	7	14	14	7	42

=== At Notre Dame ===
	1	2	3	4	Total
Cardinals	3	3	0	10	16
No. 8 Fighting Irish	7	7	10	0	24

=== At Indiana ===
Ball State Cardinals (1–1) vs Indiana Hoosiers (2–0) – Game summary

Quarter	1	2	3	4	Total
Cardinals	3	0	7	0	10
Hoosiers	3	21	7	7	38

at Memorial Stadium • Bloomington, Indiana

- Date: September 15, 2018
- Game time: 12:00 p.m.
- Game weather: Sunny, 84 °F (29 °C)
- Game attendance: 40,240
- Referee: Ron Snodgrass
- TV announcers (BTN): Chris Denari (play-by-play), Bobby Carpenter (analyst)

Game information

First quarter

- (11:01) BALL – Morgan Hagee 31-yard field goal (Drive: 11 plays, 61 yards, 3:55; Ball State 3–0)
- (7:47) IU – Logan Justus 21-yard field goal (Drive: 12 plays, 70 yards, 3:03; Tied 3–3)

Second quarter

- (14:55) IU – Stevie Scott III 1-yard run, Logan Justus kick (Drive: 12 plays, 89 yards, 4:39; Indiana 10–3)
- (12:26) IU – J-Shun Harris 86-yard punt return, Logan Justus kick (Drive: 5 plays, 22 yards, 2:07; Indiana 17–3)
- (0:22) IU – Peyton Ramsey 5-yard run, Logan Justus kick (Drive: 9 plays, 72 yards, 2:51; Indiana 24–3)

Third quarter

- (8:52) IU – Ronnie Walker 18-yard run, Logan Justus kick (Drive: 11 plays, 68 yards, 3:42; Indiana 31–3)
- (2:08) BALL – James Gilbert 27-yard run, Morgan Hagee kick (Drive: 7 plays, 60 yards, 2:26; Indiana 31–10)

Fourth quarter

- (10:11) IU – Stevie Scott III 11-yard run, Logan Justus kick (Drive: 3 plays, 38 yards, 1:39; Indiana 38–10)

Statistics	BALL	IU
First downs	18	26
Total yards	347	457
Rushes/yards	39–204	44–255
Passing yards	143	202
Passing: Comp–Att–Int	14–28–1	24–32–0
Time of possession	27:17	32:43

Team	Category	Player	Statistics
Ball State	Passing	Riley Neal	12/24, 115 yards
Ball State	Rushing	James Gilbert	16 carries, 89 yards, TD
Ball State	Receiving	Corey Lacanaria	4 receptions, 40 yards
Indiana	Passing	Peyton Ramsey	20/27, 173 yards
Indiana	Rushing	Stevie Scott III	18 carries, 114 yards, 2 TD
Indiana	Receiving	Luke Timian	5 receptions, 56 yards

=== Western Kentucky ===
	1	2	3	4	Total
Hilltoppers	0	7	7	14	28
Cardinals	7	3	3	7	20

=== Kent State ===
	1	2	3	4	Total
Golden Flashes	7	10	7	0	24
Cardinals	21	14	7	10	52

=== Northern Illinois ===
	1	2	3	4	Total
Huskies	7	7	7	3	24
Cardinals	0	6	3	7	16

=== At Central Michigan ===
	1	2	3	4	Total
Cardinals	0	7	0	17	24
Chippewas	3	17	0	3	23

=== Eastern Michigan ===
	1	2	3	4	Total
Eagles	7	14	14	7	42
Cardinals	0	6	7	7	20

=== At Ohio ===
	1	2	3	4	Total
Cardinals	7	0	0	7	14
Bobcats	0	31	21	0	52

=== At Toledo ===
	1	2	3	4	Total
Cardinals	0	7	0	6	13
Rockets	21	7	3	14	45

=== Western Michigan ===
	1	2	3	4	OT	Total
Broncos	7	10	3	15	6	41
Cardinals	7	14	7	7	7	42

=== At Miami (OH) ===
	1	2	3	4	Total
Cardinals	14	7	0	0	21
RedHawks	7	14	14	7	42
