= 2018 Kent State Golden Flashes football team =

American college football season

2018 Kent State Golden Flashes football
- Conference: Mid-American Conference
- East Division
- Record: 2–10 (1–7 MAC)
- Head coach: Sean Lewis (1st season)
- Offensive coordinator: Andrew Sowder (1st season)
- Offensive scheme: Veer and shoot
- Defensive coordinator: Tom Kaufman (1st season)
- Base defense: 3–4
- Home stadium: Dix Stadium

2018 Mid-American Conference football standings
	Conf.			Overall
Team	W		L	W		L
East Division
Buffalo x	7	–	1	10	–	4
Miami (OH)	6	–	2	6	–	6
Ohio	6	–	2	9	–	4
Akron	2	–	6	4	–	8
Bowling Green	2	–	6	3	–	9
Kent State	1	–	7	2	–	10
West Division
Northern Illinois x$	6	–	2	8	–	6
Western Michigan	5	–	3	7	–	6
Eastern Michigan	5	–	3	7	–	6
Toledo	5	–	3	7	–	6
Ball State	3	–	5	4	–	8
Central Michigan	0	–	8	1	–	11
Championship: Northern Illinois 30, Buffalo 29
$ – Conference champion; x – Division champion/co-champions

The 2018 Kent State Golden Flashes football team represented Kent State University in the 2018 NCAA Division I FBS football season. They were led by first-year head coach Sean Lewis and played their home games at Dix Stadium in Kent, Ohio as members of the East Division of the Mid-American Conference. They finished the season 2–10, 1–7 in MAC play to finish in last place in the East Division.

== Preseason ==
=== Award watch lists ===
Listed in the order that they were released

Award	Player	Position	Year
Ray Guy Award	Derek Adams	P	JR
Wuerffel Trophy	Matt Bahr	LB	SR

=== Preseason media poll ===
The MAC released their preseason media poll on July 24, 2018, with the Golden Flashes predicted to finish in last place in the East Division.

== Roster ==
2018 Kent State Golden Flashes football team roster
Players
Coaches
Offense

Pos.	#	Name	Class
RB	2	Will Matthews	Jr
WR	10	Kavious Price	Jr
RB	11	Justin Rankin	Jr
RB	12	Darrick Edwards	Jr
WR	12	Raymond James	So
QB	13	Will Phillis	Fr
QB	14	Dustin Crum	So
QB	15	Woody Barrett	So
QB	17	Marquez Glover	Fr
QB	18	Pyrce Taylor	Fr
RB	18	Xavier Williams	Fr
WR	19	Donte Ross	Sr
WR	20	Trey Harrell	Jr
WR	22	Javaughn Williams	Fr
WR	23	Isaiah McKoy	Fr
RB, WR	24	Raekwon James	Sr
RB	25	Craig Elmore	Fr
RB, TE	26	Myles Washington	Jr
RB	27	Isaac Vance	Fr
WR	28	Mandela Lawrence−Burke	Jr
RB	33	Jo−El Shaw	Jr
TE	45	Adam Dulka	So
TE	46	Mitch Lengyel	So
OL	54	Nate Warnock	Jr
OL	55	Julian Sams	Fr
OL	62	Mike Morris	Fr
OL	64	Bryce Gibbs	Jr
OL	65	Luke Dye	Fr
OL	67	Nathan Monnin	So
OL	68	Mike Marinelli	Jr
OL	69	Sam Allan	Fr
OL	70	Jack Clement	Fr
OL	71	Eddie Brecht	Fr
OL	72	Jamil Viaud	Jr
OL	73	Zach Whaley	Fr
OL	75	Adam Gregoire	Jr
OL	76	Chase Van Hoef	Jr
OL	77	Daniel Johnson	Fr
OL	78	Zach Corrigall	So
WR	80	Johnny Woods	Sr
WR	81	Dominic DiGioia	Jr
WR	83	Lon'kevious McFadden	Fr
WR	84	Jalil Nelson	Fr
TE	85	Mark Williams	Fr
WR	86	Zaquon Tyson	Sr
WR	87	Mike Carrigan	Jr
TE	88	Conor Brumfield	Jr
WR	89	Antwan Dixon	Jr

Defense

Pos.	#	Name	Class
LB	1	Nick Faulkner	Jr
LB	6	Matt Bahr	Sr
CB	7	Jamal Parker	Jr
S	8	Elvis Hines	So
CB	10	Quan Robinson Jr.	Sr
DL	11	Jordan Silva	Sr
S	13	Erik Simpson	Sr
S	14	John Henry Bronczek	Jr
CB	15	Keith Sherald Jr.	So
LB	19	A.J. Musolino	Fr
CB	21	Montre Miller	Fr
LB	22	Jim Jones	Sr
S	25	Juantez McRae	Sr
DB	26	Richie Carpenter Jr.	Jr
CB	29	Capone Blue	Fr
CB	30	Darryl Marshall	Sr
S	31	Akeam Peters	Jr
LB	32	Dalton Hicks	Jr
LB	34	Kesean Gamble	So
CB	36	Jeremiah Salaam	Fr
LB	37	Cepeda Phillips	So
S	38	Jae'Vante Ray	Jr
CB	39	Miles Daniel	So
S	41	Rodley Jolicoeur	Fr
DE	42	Jordan Felice	Fr
DE, LB	43	Tyler Britton	So
LB	44	Matt Harmon	Fr
NT	49	Kalil Morris	Sr
LB	50	Sebastian Spear	So
DL	51	Connor Parks	Fr
LB	52	Ishmael Robinson	Fr
DE	53	Alex Hoag	Jr
DL	56	Elijah Ratliff	Fr
LB	57	William Luckey	Fr
DE	58	Theo Eboigbe	Sr
DL	59	Will Burns	Fr
DL	91	Neiman Novitski	Fr
DL	92	Theo Majette	Jr
DL	93	Matt Bell	So
DL	94	Dennis Wariboko	Jr
DE	97	Zayin West	Fr
NT	98	Dominic Hill	Jr

Special teams

Pos.	#	Name	Class
K	60	Dalton DeChristopher	Fr
K	82	Matthew Trickett	Fr
K	90	Colten McFadden	Fr
P	94	Grant Urenovitch	So
LS	95	Joey Palumbo	Jr
P	96	Derek Adams	Jr

Head coach

- Sean Lewis

Coordinators/assistant coaches

- Tom Kaufman (Defensive Coordinator/Associate HC)
- Andrew Sowder (Offensive Coordinator)
- Zac Barton (Special Teams Coordinator)
- Colin Ferrell (Outside Linebackers)
- Brian Cochran (Defensive Line)
- Jonathan Cooley (Secondary)
- Matthew Middleton (Wide Receivers)
- Bill O'Boyle (Offensive Line)
- Macky MacPherson (Running Backs)
- Will Windham (Inside Linebackers)
- Dominic Clegg (Defensive Graduate Assistant)
- Matt Battaglia (Offensive Graduate Assistant)
- Matt Johnson (Offensive Graduate Assistant)
- Dan Conwell (Defensive Graduate Assistant)

Legend

- (C) Team captain
- (S) Suspended
- (I) Ineligible
- Injured
- Redshirt

Roster

== Schedule ==
Date	Time	Opponent	Site	TV	Result	Attendance
September 1	12:00 p.m.	at Illinois*	Memorial Stadium; Champaign, IL	BTN	L 24–31	31,898
September 8	3:30 p.m.	Howard (FCS)*	Dix Stadium; Kent, OH	ESPN+	W 54–14	15,242
September 15	12:00 p.m.	at No. 11 Penn State*	Beaver Stadium; University Park, PA	FS1	L 10–63	106,528
September 22	12:00 p.m.	at Ole Miss*	Vaught–Hemingway Stadium; Oxford, MS	SECN	L 17–38	50,417
September 29	3:00 p.m.	at Ball State	Scheumann Stadium; Muncie, IN	ESPN+	L 24–52	9,367
October 6	3:30 p.m.	Ohio	Dix Stadium; Kent, OH	ESPN+	L 26–27	20,062
October 13	2:30 p.m.	at Miami (OH)	Yager Stadium; Oxford, OH	ESPN+	L 6–31	5,003
October 20	3:30 p.m.	Akron	Dix Stadium; Kent, OH (Wagon Wheel)	ESPN+	L 23–24 ^{OT}	18,774
October 30	8:00 p.m.	at Bowling Green	Doyt Perry Stadium; Bowling Green, OH (Anniversary Award)	ESPNU	W 35–28	13,131
November 6	7:30 p.m.	at Buffalo	University at Buffalo Stadium; Amherst, NY	ESPNU	L 14–48	15,078
November 15	6:00 p.m.	Toledo	Dix Stadium; Kent, OH	CBSSN	L 34–56	5,387
November 23	12:00 p.m.	Eastern Michigan	Dix Stadium; Kent, OH	ESPN3	L 20–28	6,125
*Non-conference game; Rankings from AP Poll released prior to the game; All times are in Eastern time

== Game summaries ==
=== At Illinois ===
	1	2	3	4	Total
Golden Flashes	7	10	7	0	24
Fighting Illini	3	0	21	7	31

=== Howard ===
	1	2	3	4	Total
Bison	0	0	14	0	14
Golden Flashes	16	10	21	7	54

=== At Penn State ===
	1	2	3	4	Total
Golden Flashes	7	3	0	0	10
No. 11 Nittany Lions	21	7	21	14	63

=== At Ole Miss ===
	1	2	3	4	Total
Golden Flashes	0	7	10	0	17
Rebels	7	0	17	14	38

=== At Ball State ===
	1	2	3	4	Total
Golden Flashes	7	10	7	0	24
Cardinals	21	14	7	10	52

=== Ohio ===
	1	2	3	4	Total
Bobcats	7	0	7	13	27
Golden Flashes	14	3	6	3	26

=== At Miami (OH) ===
	1	2	3	4	Total
Golden Flashes	0	0	0	6	6
RedHawks	0	21	10	0	31

=== Akron ===
	1	2	3	4	OT	Total
Zips	7	3	7	0	7	24
Golden Flashes	3	7	7	0	6	23

=== At Bowling Green ===
	1	2	3	4	Total
Golden Flashes	7	7	7	14	35
Falcons	3	10	0	15	28

=== At Buffalo ===
	1	2	3	4	Total
Golden Flashes	0	0	0	14	14
Bulls	21	13	14	0	48

=== Toledo ===
	1	2	3	4	Total
Rockets	14	14	21	7	56
Golden Flashes	7	10	10	7	34

=== Eastern Michigan ===
	1	2	3	4	Total
Eagles	7	14	7	0	28
Golden Flashes	10	0	7	3	20
