= 2018 Akron Zips football team =

American college football season

2018 Akron Zips football
- Conference: Mid-American Conference
- East Division
- Record: 4–8 (2–6 MAC)
- Head coach: Terry Bowden (7th season)
- Offensive coordinator: A. J. Milwee (6th season)
- Offensive scheme: Spread
- Defensive coordinator: Todd Stroud (1st season)
- Base defense: 4–3
- Captain: Kyron Brown; Ulysees Gilbert III; Kyle Ritz
- Home stadium: InfoCision Stadium–Summa Field

2018 Mid-American Conference football standings
	Conf.			Overall
Team	W		L	W		L
East Division
Buffalo x	7	–	1	10	–	4
Miami (OH)	6	–	2	6	–	6
Ohio	6	–	2	9	–	4
Akron	2	–	6	4	–	8
Bowling Green	2	–	6	3	–	9
Kent State	1	–	7	2	–	10
West Division
Northern Illinois x$	6	–	2	8	–	6
Western Michigan	5	–	3	7	–	6
Eastern Michigan	5	–	3	7	–	6
Toledo	5	–	3	7	–	6
Ball State	3	–	5	4	–	8
Central Michigan	0	–	8	1	–	11
Championship: Northern Illinois 30, Buffalo 29
$ – Conference champion; x – Division champion/co-champions

The 2018 Akron Zips football team represented the University of Akron in the 2018 NCAA Division I FBS football season. They were led by seventh-year head coach Terry Bowden and played their home games at InfoCision Stadium–Summa Field in Akron, Ohio as members of the East Division of the Mid-American Conference. They finished the season 4–8, 2–6 in MAC play to finish in a tie for fourth place in the East Division.

On December 2, Akron fired head coach Terry Bowden. He finished at Akron with a seven-year record of 35–52. On December 14, the school hired Chattanooga head coach Tom Arth for the head coaching job.

== Preseason ==
=== Award watch lists ===
Listed in the order that they were released

Award	Player	Position	Year
Chuck Bednarik Award	Ulysees Gilbert	LB	SR
Fred Biletnikoff Award	Kwadarrius Smith	WR	SR
Jim Thorpe Award	Kyron Brown	CB	SR
Bronko Nagurski Trophy	Ulysees Gilbert	LB	SR

=== Preseason media poll ===
The MAC released their preseason media poll on July 24, 2018, with the Zips predicted to finish in fourth place in the East Division.

== Schedule ==
Date	Time	Opponent	Site	TV	Result	Attendance
September 8	3:30 p.m.	Morgan State*	InfoCision Stadium–Summa Field; Akron, OH	ESPN+	W 41–7	18,413
September 15	7:30 p.m.	at Northwestern*	Ryan Field; Evanston, IL	BTN	W 39–34	40,014
September 22	11:00 a.m.	at Iowa State*	Jack Trice Stadium; Ames, IA	FSN	L 13–26	54,028
October 6	3:30 p.m.	Miami (OH)^{†}	InfoCision Stadium–Summa Field; Akron, OH	ESPN+	L 17–41	22,437
October 13	12:00 p.m.	at Buffalo	University at Buffalo Stadium; Amherst, NY	CBSSN	L 6–24	19,506
October 20	3:30 p.m.	at Kent State	Dix Stadium; Kent, OH (Wagon Wheel)	ESPN+	W 24–23 ^{OT}	18,774
October 27	12:00 p.m.	Central Michigan	InfoCision Stadium–Summa Field; Akron, OH	ESPN3	W 17–10	17,582
November 1	7:00 p.m.	Northern Illinois	InfoCision Stadium–Summa Field; Akron, OH	CBSSN	L 26–36	16,401
November 10	12:00 p.m.	at Eastern Michigan	Rynearson Stadium; Ypsilanti, MI	ESPN3	L 7–27	12,403
November 17	3:30 p.m.	Bowling Green	InfoCision Stadium–Summa Field; Akron, OH	ESPN3	L 6–21	17,742
November 23	12:00 p.m.	at Ohio	Peden Stadium; Athens, OH	CBSSN	L 28–49	12,938
December 1^{[a]}	12:00 p.m.	at South Carolina*	Williams–Brice Stadium; Columbia, SC	SECN	L 3–28	53,420
*Non-conference game; ^{†}Homecoming; All times are in Eastern time

^{^[a]}The game between Akron and Nebraska, originally scheduled for September 1, 2018, was canceled due to inclement weather. The Zips agreed to schedule South Carolina, who also canceled a game earlier in the year due to Hurricane Florence.

== Game summaries ==
=== Morgan State ===
	1	2	3	4	Total
Bears	0	0	0	7	7
Zips	17	10	14	0	41

=== At Northwestern ===
	1	2	3	4	Total
Zips	0	3	23	13	39
Wildcats	7	14	7	6	34

=== At Iowa State ===
	1	2	3	4	Total
Zips	7	3	3	0	13
Cyclones	7	10	0	9	26

=== Miami (OH) ===
	1	2	3	4	Total
RedHawks	0	14	10	17	41
Zips	0	10	7	0	17

=== At Buffalo ===
	1	2	3	4	Total
Zips	3	3	0	0	6
Bulls	7	3	7	7	24

=== At Kent State ===
	1	2	3	4	OT	Total
Zips	7	3	7	0	7	24
Golden Flashes	3	7	7	0	6	23

=== Central Michigan ===
	1	2	3	4	Total
Chippewas	0	0	10	0	10
Zips	7	10	0	0	17

=== Northern Illinois ===
	1	2	3	4	Total
Huskies	7	17	5	7	36
Zips	7	3	16	0	26

=== At Eastern Michigan ===
	1	2	3	4	Total
Zips	0	7	0	0	7
Eagles	7	3	0	17	27

=== Bowling Green ===
	1	2	3	4	Total
Falcons	0	7	7	7	21
Zips	3	3	0	0	6

=== At Ohio ===
	1	2	3	4	Total
Zips	0	7	7	14	28
Bobcats	21	7	7	14	49

=== At South Carolina ===
	1	2	3	4	Total
Zips	3	0	0	0	3
Gamecocks	14	14	0	0	28

== Players drafted into the NFL ==
Round	Pick	Player	Position	NFL Club
6	207	Ulysees Gilbert III	LB	Pittsburgh Steelers
