= 2018 Miami RedHawks football team =

American college football season

2018 Miami RedHawks football
- Conference: Mid-American Conference
- East Division
- Record: 6–6 (6–2 MAC)
- Head coach: Chuck Martin (5th season)
- Co-offensive coordinators: George Barnett (5th season); Eric Koehler (5th season)
- Offensive scheme: Multiple
- Co-defensive coordinators: John Hauser (3rd season); Spence Nowinsky (1st season)
- Base defense: 4–3
- Home stadium: Yager Stadium

2018 Mid-American Conference football standings
	Conf.			Overall
Team	W		L	W		L
East Division
Buffalo x	7	–	1	10	–	4
Miami (OH)	6	–	2	6	–	6
Ohio	6	–	2	9	–	4
Akron	2	–	6	4	–	8
Bowling Green	2	–	6	3	–	9
Kent State	1	–	7	2	–	10
West Division
Northern Illinois x$	6	–	2	8	–	6
Western Michigan	5	–	3	7	–	6
Eastern Michigan	5	–	3	7	–	6
Toledo	5	–	3	7	–	6
Ball State	3	–	5	4	–	8
Central Michigan	0	–	8	1	–	11
Championship: Northern Illinois 30, Buffalo 29
$ – Conference champion; x – Division champion/co-champions

The 2018 Miami RedHawks football team represented Miami University in the 2018 NCAA Division I FBS football season. They were led by fifth-year head coach Chuck Martin and played their home games at Yager Stadium in Oxford, Ohio as members of the East Division of the Mid-American Conference. They finished the season 6–6, 6–2 in MAC play to finish in a tie for second place in the East division. Despite being bowl eligible, they were not invited to a bowl game.

== Preseason ==
=== Award watch lists ===
Listed in the order that they were released

Award	Player	Position	Year
Rimington Trophy	Danny Godlevske	C	SO
Maxwell Award	James Gardner	WR	SR
Doak Walker Award	Kenny Young	RB	SR
Fred Biletnikoff Award	James Gardner	WR	SR
John Mackey Award	Nate Becker	TE	JR
Wuerffel Trophy	James Gardner	WR	SR
Johnny Unitas Golden Arm Award	Gus Ragland	QB	SR
Manning Award	Gus Ragland	QB	SR

=== Preseason media poll ===
The MAC released their preseason media poll on July 24, 2018, with the RedHawks predicted to finish in third place in the East Division.

== Schedule ==
Date	Time	Opponent	Site	TV	Result	Attendance
September 1	3:30 p.m.	Marshall*^{†}	Yager Stadium; Oxford, OH	ESPN+	L 28–35	15,827
September 8	8:00 p.m.	vs. Cincinnati*	Paul Brown Stadium; Cincinnati, OH (Victory Bell)	ESPN3, FOX 19	L 0–21	16,062
September 15	3:30 p.m.	at Minnesota*	TCF Bank Stadium; Minneapolis, MN	BTN	L 3–26	41,162
September 22	3:00 p.m.	at Bowling Green	Doyt Perry Stadium; Bowling Green, OH	ESPN+	W 38–23	14,380
September 29	3:30 p.m.	Western Michigan	Yager Stadium; Oxford, OH	ESPN+	L 39–40	15,012
October 6	3:30 p.m.	at Akron	InfoCision Stadium–Summa Field; Akron, OH	ESPN+	W 41–17	22,437
October 13	2:30 p.m.	Kent State	Yager Stadium; Oxford, OH	ESPN+	W 31–6	5,003
October 20	12:00 p.m.	at Army*	Michie Stadium; West Point, NY	CBSSN	L 30–31 ^{2OT}	38,016
October 30	8:00 p.m.	at Buffalo	University at Buffalo Stadium; Amherst, NY	ESPN2	L 42–51	15,682
November 7	7:00 p.m.	Ohio	Yager Stadium; Oxford, OH (Battle of the Bricks)	ESPNU	W 30–28	15,975
November 14	8:00 p.m.	at Northern Illinois	Huskie Stadium; DeKalb, IL	ESPNU	W 13–7	4,878
November 20	7:00 p.m.	Ball State	Yager Stadium; Oxford, OH	ESPN+	W 42–21	17,639
*Non-conference game; ^{†}Homecoming; All times are in Eastern time

== Game summaries ==
=== Marshall ===
	1	2	3	4	Total
Thundering Herd	14	7	7	7	35
RedHawks	0	7	7	14	28

=== Vs. Cincinnati ===
	1	2	3	4	Total
RedHawks	0	0	0	0	0
Bearcats	7	0	0	14	21

=== At Minnesota ===
	1	2	3	4	Total
RedHawks	0	3	0	0	3
Golden Gophers	7	12	7	0	26

=== At Bowling Green ===
	1	2	3	4	Total
RedHawks	7	17	7	7	38
Falcons	0	3	0	20	23

=== Western Michigan ===
	1	2	3	4	Total
Broncos	14	0	13	13	40
RedHawks	17	10	6	6	39

=== At Akron ===
	1	2	3	4	Total
RedHawks	0	14	10	17	41
Zips	0	10	7	0	17

=== Kent State ===
	1	2	3	4	Total
Golden Flashes	0	0	0	6	6
RedHawks	0	21	10	0	31

=== At Army ===
	1	2	3	4	OT	2OT	Total
RedHawks	0	7	0	14	3	6	30
Black Knights	7	7	7	0	3	7	31

=== At Buffalo ===
	1	2	3	4	Total
RedHawks	14	7	21	0	42
Bulls	14	14	14	9	51

=== Ohio ===
	1	2	3	4	Total
Bobcats	7	0	7	14	28
RedHawks	7	21	0	2	30

=== At Northern Illinois ===
	1	2	3	4	Total
RedHawks	0	3	10	0	13
Huskies	0	0	7	0	7

=== Ball State ===
	1	2	3	4	Total
Cardinals	14	7	0	0	21
RedHawks	7	14	14	7	42

== 13th game proposal ==
Miami was one of four bowl-eligible teams that did not receive a bowl game invitation. The university unsuccessfully attempted to schedule a 13th game with Louisiana-Monroe, which also did not go to a bowl.
