= 2018 Western Michigan Broncos football team =

American college football season

2018 Western Michigan Broncos football

Famous Idaho Potato Bowl, L 18–49 vs. BYU
- Conference: Mid-American Conference
- West Division
- Record: 7–6 (5–3 MAC)
- Head coach: Tim Lester (2nd season)
- Offensive coordinator: Jake Moreland (2nd season)
- Offensive scheme: West Coast
- Defensive coordinator: Tim Daoust (2nd season)
- Co-defensive coordinator: Lou Esposito (2nd season)
- Base defense: 4–3 or 4–2–5
- Home stadium: Waldo Stadium

2018 Mid-American Conference football standings
	Conf.			Overall
Team	W		L	W		L
East Division
Buffalo x	7	–	1	10	–	4
Miami (OH)	6	–	2	6	–	6
Ohio	6	–	2	9	–	4
Akron	2	–	6	4	–	8
Bowling Green	2	–	6	3	–	9
Kent State	1	–	7	2	–	10
West Division
Northern Illinois x$	6	–	2	8	–	6
Western Michigan	5	–	3	7	–	6
Eastern Michigan	5	–	3	7	–	6
Toledo	5	–	3	7	–	6
Ball State	3	–	5	4	–	8
Central Michigan	0	–	8	1	–	11
Championship: Northern Illinois 30, Buffalo 29
$ – Conference champion; x – Division champion/co-champions

The 2018 Western Michigan Broncos football team represented Western Michigan University (WMU) in the 2018 NCAA Division I FBS football season. They were led by second-year head coach Tim Lester and played their home games at Waldo Stadium as a member of the West Division of the Mid-American Conference. They finished the season 7–6, 5–3 in MAC play to finish in a three-way tie for second place in the West Division. They were invited to the Famous Idaho Potato Bowl where they lost to BYU.

== Preseason ==
=== Award watch lists ===
Listed in the order that they were released

Award	Player	Position	Year
Rimington Trophy	John Keenoy	C	SR
Doak Walker Award	Jamauri Bogan	RB	SR
Doak Walker Award	LeVante Bellamy	RB	JR
John Mackey Award	Giovanni Ricci	TE	JR
Outland Trophy	Luke Juriga	G	JR
Outland Trophy	John Keenoy	C	SR
Wuerffel Trophy	Jamauri Bogan	RB	SR
Wuerffel Trophy	Justin Tranquill	DB	JR

=== Preseason media poll ===
The MAC released their preseason media poll on July 24, 2018, with the Broncos predicted to finish in third place in the West Division.

== Schedule ==
The following table lists WMU's schedule.

Date	Time	Opponent	Site	TV	Result	Attendance
August 31	6:00 p.m.	Syracuse*	Waldo Stadium; Kalamazoo, MI	CBSSN	L 42–55	20,628
September 8	Noon	at No. 21 Michigan*	Michigan Stadium; Ann Arbor, MI	FS1	L 3–49	110,814
September 15	7:00 p.m.	Delaware State*	Waldo Stadium; Kalamazoo, MI	ESPN+	W 68–0	23,244
September 22	2:00 p.m.	at Georgia State*	Georgia State Stadium; Atlanta, GA	ESPN+	W 34–15	15,264
September 29	3:30 p.m.	at Miami (OH)	Yager Stadium; Oxford, OH	ESPN+	W 40–39	15,012
October 6	Noon	Eastern Michigan^{†}	Waldo Stadium; Kalamazoo, MI (Michigan MAC Trophy)	ESPN+	W 27–24	24,282
October 13	3:00 p.m.	at Bowling Green	Doyt Perry Stadium; Bowling Green, OH	ESPN+	W 42–35	18,551
October 20	3:00 p.m.	at Central Michigan	Kelly/Shorts Stadium; Mount Pleasant, MI (Victory Cannon / Michigan MAC Trophy)	ESPN+	W 35–10	10,097
October 25	7:00 p.m.	Toledo	Waldo Stadium; Kalamazoo, MI	ESPN2	L 24–51	11,389
November 1	7:00 p.m.	Ohio	Waldo Stadium; Kalamazoo, MI	ESPNU	L 14–59	11,935
November 13	6:00 p.m.	at Ball State	Scheumann Stadium; Muncie, IN	ESPN2	L 41–42 ^{OT}	5,503
November 20	7:00 p.m.	Northern Illinois	Waldo Stadium; Kalamazoo, MI	ESPNU	W 28–21	18,278
December 21	4:00 p.m.	vs. BYU*	Albertsons Stadium; Boise, ID (Famous Idaho Potato Bowl)	ESPN	L 18–49	18,711
*Non-conference game; ^{†}Homecoming; Rankings from AP Poll released prior to the game; All times are in Eastern time

== Game summaries ==
=== Syracuse ===
	1	2	3	4	Total
Orange	24	10	14	7	55
Broncos	7	0	28	7	42

Series Record	Previous meeting	Result
First meeting

=== At Michigan ===
	1	2	3	4	Total
Broncos	0	0	0	3	3
No. 21 Wolverines	21	14	7	7	49

Series Record	Previous meeting	Result
0–6	2011	MICH, 34–10

=== Delaware State ===
	1	2	3	4	Total
Hornets	0	0	0	0	0
Broncos	14	14	16	24	68

Series Record	Previous meeting	Result
First meeting

=== At Georgia State ===
	1	2	3	4	Total
Broncos	3	17	14	0	34
Panthers	0	9	6	0	15

Series Record	Previous meeting	Result
First meeting

=== At Miami (OH) ===
	1	2	3	4	Total
Broncos	14	0	13	13	40
RedHawks	17	10	6	6	39

Series Record	Previous meeting	Result
21–37–1	2015	WMU, 35–13

=== Eastern Michigan ===
	1	2	3	4	Total
Eagles	0	10	7	7	24
Broncos	7	7	0	13	27

Series Record	Previous meeting	Result
33–18–2	2017	WMU, 20–17

=== At Bowling Green ===
	1	2	3	4	Total
Broncos	0	7	21	14	42
Falcons	7	14	7	7	35

Series Record	Previous meeting	Result
18–32–3	2015	BGSU, 41–27

=== At Central Michigan ===
	1	2	3	4	Total
Broncos	7	14	0	14	35
Chippewas	0	0	10	0	10

Series Record	Previous meeting	Result
48–38–2	2017	CMU, 35–28

=== Toledo ===
	1	2	3	4	Total
Rockets	14	9	21	7	51
Broncos	7	10	7	0	24

Series Record	Previous meeting	Result
30–42	2017	TOL, 37–10

=== Ohio ===
	1	2	3	4	Total
Bobcats	21	24	7	7	59
Broncos	0	0	7	7	14

Series Record	Previous meeting	Result
33–28–1	2016	WMU, 29–23

=== At Ball State ===
	1	2	3	4	OT	Total
Broncos	7	10	3	15	6	41
Cardinals	7	14	7	7	7	42

Series Record	Previous meeting	Result
25–19	2017	WMU, 55–3

=== Northern Illinois ===
	1	2	3	4	Total
Huskies	7	0	14	0	21
Broncos	7	6	8	7	28

Series Record	Previous meeting	Result
24–18	2017	NIU, 35–31

=== Vs. BYU (Famous Idaho Potato Bowl) ===
	1	2	3	4	Total
Cougars	7	0	28	14	49
Broncos	0	10	0	8	18

Series Record	Previous meeting	Result
2–3	1970	WMU, 35–17
