= 2018 Toledo Rockets football team =

American college football season

2018 Toledo Rockets football

Bahamas Bowl, L 32–35 vs. FIU
- Conference: Mid-American Conference
- West Division
- Record: 7–6 (5–3 MAC)
- Head coach: Jason Candle (3rd season)
- Offensive coordinator: Brian Wright (3rd season)
- Offensive scheme: Spread
- Defensive coordinator: Brian George (3rd season)
- Base defense: 4–3
- Home stadium: Glass Bowl

2018 Mid-American Conference football standings
	Conf.			Overall
Team	W		L	W		L
East Division
Buffalo x	7	–	1	10	–	4
Miami (OH)	6	–	2	6	–	6
Ohio	6	–	2	9	–	4
Akron	2	–	6	4	–	8
Bowling Green	2	–	6	3	–	9
Kent State	1	–	7	2	–	10
West Division
Northern Illinois x$	6	–	2	8	–	6
Western Michigan	5	–	3	7	–	6
Eastern Michigan	5	–	3	7	–	6
Toledo	5	–	3	7	–	6
Ball State	3	–	5	4	–	8
Central Michigan	0	–	8	1	–	11
Championship: Northern Illinois 30, Buffalo 29
$ – Conference champion; x – Division champion/co-champions

The 2018 Toledo Rockets football team represented the University of Toledo in the 2018 NCAA Division I FBS football season. They were led by third-year head coach Jason Candle and played their home games at the Glass Bowl as members of the West Division of the Mid-American Conference. They finished the season 7–6, 5–3 in MAC play to finish in a three-way tie for second place in the West Division. They were invited to the Bahamas Bowl where they lost to FIU.

== Preseason ==
=== Award watch lists ===
Listed in the order that they were released

Award	Player	Position	Year
Fred Biletnikoff Award	Diontae Johnson	WR	JR
Fred Biletnikoff Award	Cody Thompson	WR	SR
Lou Groza Award	Jameson Vest	K	SR
Paul Hornung Award	Diontae Johnson	WR/KR	JR
Wuerffel Trophy	Cody Thompson	WR	SR
Walter Camp Award	Diontae Johnson	WR	JR

=== Preseason media poll ===
The MAC released their preseason media poll on July 24, 2018, with the Rockets predicted to finish in second place in the West Division.

== Schedule ==
Date	Time	Opponent	Site	TV	Result	Attendance
September 1	7:00 p.m.	VMI*	Glass Bowl; Toledo, OH	ESPN3	W 66–3	24,136
September 15	12:00 p.m.	No. 21 Miami (FL)*	Glass Bowl; Toledo, OH	ESPN2	L 24–49	28,117
September 22	12:00 p.m.	Nevada*	Glass Bowl; Toledo, OH	CBSSN	W 63–44	23,675
September 29	10:30 p.m.	at Fresno State*	Bulldog Stadium; Fresno, CA	ESPNU	L 27–49	33,401
October 6	3:30 p.m.	Bowling Green^{†}	Glass Bowl; Toledo, OH (Battle of I-75 Trophy)	ESPN+	W 52–36	24,685
October 13	12:00 p.m.	at Eastern Michigan	Rynearson Stadium; Ypsilanti, MI	ESPN+	L 26–28	17,998
October 20	12:00 p.m.	Buffalo	Glass Bowl; Toledo, OH	ESPN+/WTOL	L 17–31	18,114
October 25	7:00 p.m.	at Western Michigan	Waldo Stadium; Kalamazoo, MI	ESPN2	W 51–24	11,389
October 31	7:30 p.m.	Ball State	Glass Bowl; Toledo, OH	ESPN2	W 45–13	15,214
November 7	8:00 p.m.	at Northern Illinois	Huskie Stadium; DeKalb, IL	ESPN2	L 15–38	5,887
November 15	6:00 p.m.	at Kent State	Dix Stadium; Kent, OH	CBSSN	W 56–34	5,387
November 23	12:00 p.m.	Central Michigan	Glass Bowl; Toledo, OH	ESPN3	W 51–13	15,521
December 21	12:30 p.m.	vs. FIU*	Thomas Robinson Stadium; Nassau, Bahamas (Bahamas Bowl)	ESPN	L 32–35	13,510
*Non-conference game; ^{†}Homecoming; Rankings from AP Poll released prior to the game; All times are in Eastern time

== Game summaries ==
=== VMI ===
	1	2	3	4	Total
Keydets	0	3	0	0	3
Rockets	21	21	21	3	66

Series Record	Previous meeting	Result
First meeting

=== Miami (FL) ===
	1	2	3	4	Total
No. 21 Hurricanes	7	14	14	14	49
Rockets	0	7	14	3	24

Series Record	Previous meeting	Result
0–2	2017	MIFL, 52–30

=== Nevada ===
	1	2	3	4	Total
Wolf Pack	7	17	14	6	44
Rockets	14	21	14	14	63

Series Record	Previous meeting	Result
4–0	2017	TOL, 37–24

=== At Fresno State ===
	1	2	3	4	Total
Rockets	7	6	0	14	27
Bulldogs	7	21	21	0	49

Series Record	Previous meeting	Result
1–2	2016	TOL, 52–17

=== Bowling Green ===
	1	2	3	4	Total
Falcons	7	14	7	8	36
Rockets	17	7	7	21	52

Series Record	Previous meeting	Result
39–39–4	2017	TOL, 66–37

=== At Eastern Michigan ===
	1	2	3	4	Total
Rockets	3	0	3	20	26
Eagles	21	7	0	0	28

Series Record	Previous meeting	Result
34–11	2017	TOL, 20–15

=== Buffalo ===
	1	2	3	4	Total
Bulls	0	7	10	14	31
Rockets	7	10	0	0	17

Series Record	Previous meeting	Result
7–3	2013	TOL, 51–41

=== At Western Michigan ===
	1	2	3	4	Total
Rockets	14	9	21	7	51
Broncos	7	10	7	0	24

Series Record	Previous meeting	Result
42–30	2017	TOL, 37–10

=== Ball State ===
	1	2	3	4	Total
Cardinals	0	7	0	6	13
Rockets	21	7	3	14	45

Series Record	Previous meeting	Result
23–18–1	2017	TOL, 58–17

=== At Northern Illinois ===
	1	2	3	4	Total
Rockets	3	6	0	6	15
Huskies	7	10	14	7	38

Series Record	Previous meeting	Result
31–14	2017	TOL, 27–17

=== At Kent State ===
	1	2	3	4	Total
Rockets	14	14	21	7	56
Golden Flashes	7	10	10	7	34

Series Record	Previous meeting	Result
25–21	2015	TOL, 38–7

=== Central Michigan ===
	1	2	3	4	Total
Chippewas	0	0	0	13	13
Rockets	14	10	13	14	51

Series Record	Previous meeting	Result
25–18–3	2017	TOL, 30–10

=== Vs. FIU (Bahamas Bowl) ===
	1	2	3	4	Total
Panthers	0	14	7	14	35
Rockets	10	0	7	15	32

Series Record	Previous meeting	Result
1–2	2010	FIU, 34–32

== After the season ==
=== NFL draft ===
The following Rockets were selected in the 2019 NFL draft following the season.

Round	Pick	Player	Position	NFL club
3	66	Diontae Johnson	Wide receiver	Pittsburgh Steelers
6	185	Ka'dar Hollman	Cornerback	Green Bay Packers
