= 2018 Buffalo Bulls football team =

American college football season

2018 Buffalo Bulls football

MAC East Division champion

MAC Championship, L 29–30 vs. Northern Illinois

Dollar General Bowl, L 32–42 vs. Troy
- Conference: Mid-American Conference
- East Division
- Record: 10–4 (7–1 MAC)
- Head coach: Lance Leipold (4th season)
- Offensive coordinator: Andy Kotelnicki (4th season)
- Offensive scheme: Multiple pro-style
- Defensive coordinator: Brian Borland (4th season)
- Base defense: 4–3
- Captains: Khalil Hodge; James O'Hagan
- Home stadium: University at Buffalo Stadium

Uniform
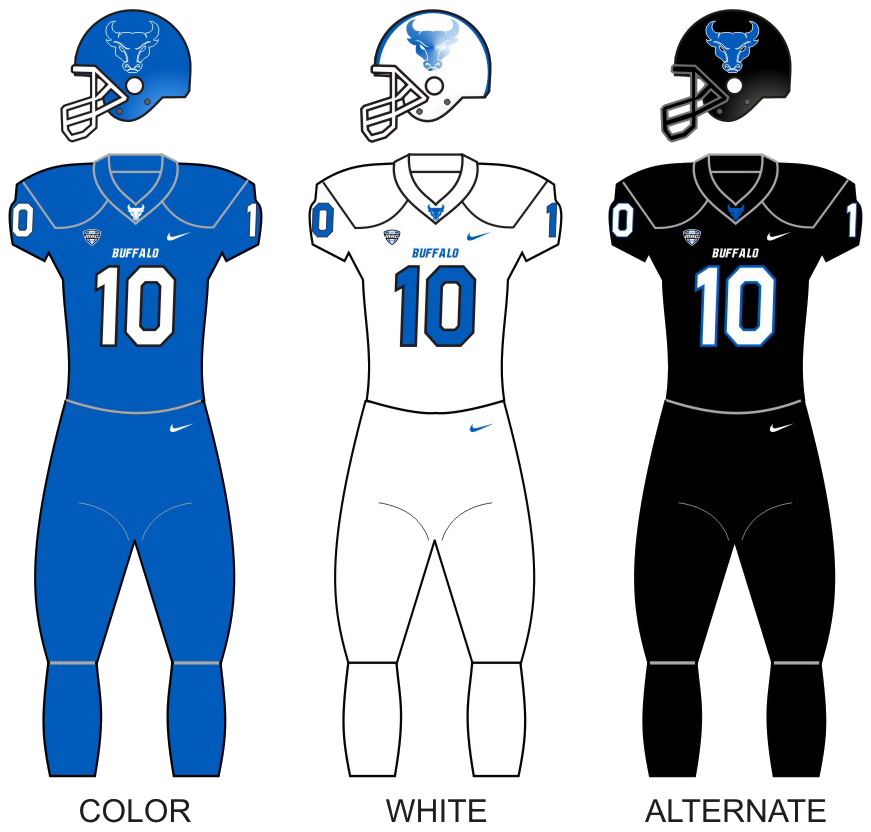

2018 Mid-American Conference football standings
	Conf.			Overall
Team	W		L	W		L
East Division
Buffalo x	7	–	1	10	–	4
Miami (OH)	6	–	2	6	–	6
Ohio	6	–	2	9	–	4
Akron	2	–	6	4	–	8
Bowling Green	2	–	6	3	–	9
Kent State	1	–	7	2	–	10
West Division
Northern Illinois x$	6	–	2	8	–	6
Western Michigan	5	–	3	7	–	6
Eastern Michigan	5	–	3	7	–	6
Toledo	5	–	3	7	–	6
Ball State	3	–	5	4	–	8
Central Michigan	0	–	8	1	–	11
Championship: Northern Illinois 30, Buffalo 29
$ – Conference champion; x – Division champion/co-champions

The 2018 Buffalo Bulls football team represented the University at Buffalo as a member of the Mid-American Conference (MAC) during the 2018 NCAA Division I FBS football season. Led by fourth-year head coach Lance Leipold, the Bulls compiled an overall record of 10–4 with a mark of 7–1 in conference play, winning the MAC's East Division title. Buffalo advanced to the MAC Championship Game, where the Bulls lost to Northern Illinois. Buffalo concluded the season in the Dollar General Bowl, losing to Troy. The Bulls recorded their first winning season and bowl game appearance since 2013. The ten wins remain the most of any season in program history, topping the previous high mark of eight wins in 2008. The team played home games at University at Buffalo Stadium in Amherst, New York.

== Schedule ==
Date	Time	Opponent	Site	TV	Result	Attendance
September 1	6:00 p.m.	Delaware State*	University at Buffalo Stadium; Amherst, NY	ESPN3	W 48–10	17,959
September 8	3:30 p.m.	at Temple*	Lincoln Financial Field; Philadelphia, PA	ESPN3	W 36–29	25,511
September 15	6:00 p.m.	Eastern Michigan	University at Buffalo Stadium; Amherst, NY	ESPN+	W 35–28	18,384
September 22	12:00 p.m.	at Rutgers*	High Point Solutions Stadium; Piscataway, NJ	BTN	W 42–13	34,574
September 29	12:00 p.m.	Army*	University at Buffalo Stadium; Amherst, NY	CBSSN	L 13–42	23,671
October 6	12:00 p.m.	at Central Michigan	Kelly/Shorts Stadium; Mount Pleasant, MI	CBSSN	W 34–24	14,044
October 13	12:00 p.m.	Akron^{†}	University at Buffalo Stadium; Amherst, NY	CBSSN	W 24–6	19,506
October 20	12:00 p.m.	at Toledo	Glass Bowl; Toledo, OH	ESPN+, WGRZ	W 31–17	18,114
October 30	8:00 p.m.	Miami (OH)	University at Buffalo Stadium; Amherst, NY	ESPN2	W 51–42	15,682
November 6	7:30 p.m.	Kent State	University at Buffalo Stadium; Amherst, NY	ESPNU	W 48–14	15,078
November 14	7:00 p.m.	at Ohio	Peden Stadium; Athens, OH	ESPN2	L 17–52	13,839
November 23	12:00 p.m.	at Bowling Green	Doyt Perry Stadium; Bowling Green, OH	ESPNU	W 44–14	10,518
November 30	7:00 p.m.	vs. Northern Illinois	Ford Field; Detroit, MI (MAC Championship Game)	ESPN2	L 29–30	10,255
December 22	6:00 p.m.	vs. Troy*	Ladd–Peebles Stadium; Mobile, AL (Dollar General Bowl)	ESPN	L 32–42	31,818
*Non-conference game; ^{†}Homecoming; All times are in Eastern time

== Preseason ==
=== Award watch lists ===
Listed in the order that they were released

Award	Player	Position	Year
Rimington Trophy	James O'Hagan	C	SR
Chuck Bednarik Award	Khalil Hodge	LB	SR
Maxwell Award	Anthony Johnson	WR	SR
Davey O'Brien Award	Tyree Jackson	QB	JR
Doak Walker Award	Emmanuel Reed	RB	JR
Fred Biletnikoff Award	Anthony Johnson	WR	SR
John Mackey Award	Tyler Mabry	TE	JR
Butkus Award	Khalil Hodge	LB	SR
Bronko Nagurski Trophy	Khalil Hodge	LB	SR
Johnny Unitas Golden Arm Award	Tyree Jackson	QB	JR

=== Preseason media poll ===
The MAC released their preseason media poll on July 24, 2018, with the Bulls predicted to finish in second place in the East Division.

== Game summaries ==
=== Delaware State ===
	1	2	3	4	Total
Hornets	0	3	0	7	10
Bulls	20	14	14	0	48

=== At Temple ===
	1	2	3	4	Total
Bulls	6	6	10	14	36
Owls	0	7	7	15	29

=== Eastern Michigan ===
	1	2	3	4	Total
Eagles	0	21	0	7	28
Bulls	14	14	0	7	35

=== At Rutgers ===
	1	2	3	4	Total
Bulls	14	21	0	7	42
Scarlet Knights	3	3	0	7	13

=== Army ===
	1	2	3	4	Total
Black Knights	7	14	7	14	42
Bulls	7	0	6	0	13

=== At Central Michigan ===
	1	2	3	4	Total
Bulls	7	10	7	10	34
Chippewas	3	0	14	7	24

=== Akron ===
	1	2	3	4	Total
Zips	3	3	0	0	6
Bulls	7	3	7	7	24

=== At Toledo ===
	1	2	3	4	Total
Bulls	0	7	10	14	31
Rockets	7	10	0	0	17

=== Miami (OH) ===
	1	2	3	4	Total
RedHawks	14	7	21	0	42
Bulls	14	14	14	9	51

=== Kent State ===
	1	2	3	4	Total
Golden Flashes	0	0	0	14	14
Bulls	21	13	14	0	48

=== At Ohio ===
	1	2	3	4	Total
Bulls	7	3	0	7	17
Bobcats	14	17	14	7	52

=== At Bowling Green ===
	1	2	3	4	Total
Bulls	13	21	7	3	44
Falcons	7	0	0	7	14

=== Vs. Northern Illinois—MAC Championship Game ===
	1	2	3	4	Total
Huskies	0	10	7	13	30
Bulls	7	15	7	0	29

=== Vs. Troy—Dollar General Bowl ===
	1	2	3	4	Total
Trojans	7	7	7	21	42
Bulls	7	10	7	8	32

== Roster ==
2018 Buffalo Bulls football team roster
Players
Coaches
Offense

Pos.	#	Name	Class
WR	1	Antonio Nunn	So
QB	3	Tyree Jackson	Jr
RB	5	Kevin Marks	Fr
QB	7	Kyle Vantrease	So
WR	8	K. J. Osborn	Jr
QB	9	Dominic Johnson	So
WR	10	Isaiah King	Jr
QB	10	Matt Myers	Fr
RB	11	Theo Anderson	So
QB	12	Kolston Brewster	Fr
WR	13	Tito Overton	So
WR	15	George Rushing	GS
WR	17	Charlie Jones	Fr
WR	18	Joshua Gaddy	Sr
WR	19	Shemar Hayes	Fr
RB	24	Johnathan Hawkins	Jr
RB	26	Jaret Patterson	Fr
WR	27	Steven Shoemaker	Fr
RB	29	Emmanuel Reed	Jr
WR	30	Josh Griffen	Fr
TE	36	Cole Burniston	Fr
WR	38	Ayorinde Idowu	Fr
RB	38	Dylan McDuffie	Fr
RB	43	Solomon Brown	Fr
TE	44	Jake Molinich	Fr
WR	47	Ameer Clark	Fr
OL	58	Matt Klenk	Fr
OL	59	Matt Klenk	Fr
OL	60	Trevor Cahill	Fr
OL	61	Will Terry	Fr
OL	62	Mike Novitsky	Fr
OL	63	Austin Kunick	Jr
OL	64	Michael Kenefick	Jr
OL	65	Tomas Jack-Kurdyla	Jr
OL	66	Jacob Gall	Fr
OL	67	Evin Ksiezarczyk	Jr
OL	69	Gabe Wallace	Fr
OL	70	Tyler Leroux	Fr
OL	71	Dan Kubik	Fr
OL	72	Paul Nosworthy	Jr
OL	73	Kayode Awosika	So
OL	74	Dan Fedor	Fr
OL	75	Trey Derouen	GS
OL	76	Jacquis Webb	Sr
OL	77	James O'Hagan	Sr
OL	79	Jack Klenk	So
TE	80	Matt McCarthy	Fr
TE	81	Tyler Mabry	Jr
WR	82	Rodney Scott III	Fr
WR	83	Anthony Johnson	Sr
TE	84	Andrew Gray	Sr
TE	85	Julien Bourassa	Fr
WR	86	LeMaro Smith Jr.	Fr
WR	87	Jovany Ruiz	So
WR	88	Dajuan Hudson	Jr
TE	89	Zac Lefebvre	So

Defense

Pos.	#	Name	Class
S	2	Ashton White	GS
CB	3	Aapri Washington	Fr
LB	4	Khalil Hodge	Sr
LB	5	Tim Terry Jr.	Fr
S	6	Jeremiah Dadeboe	Jr
S	7	Dawun Hylton	Fr
S	8	Corey Gross Jr.	Fr
CB	9	Tatum Slack	Sr
CB	12	Devon Russell	Sr
LB	13	Sean Colgan	So
CB	14	Brandon Williams	Sr
LB	16	Max Mitchell	Fr
LB	18	Roy Baker	So
LB	20	James Patterson	Fr
LB	21	Justin Mulbah	So
S	22	Joey Banks	Jr
LB	23	Jake Zimmer	Fr
LB	25	Jordan Collier	Sr
S	28	Dev Lamour	Jr
CB	30	Wankeith Akin Jr.	Fr
LB	31	Kadofi Wright	So
S	32	Owen Chambers	Fr
S	33	Tyrone Hill	So
LB	34	Ja'Varius Harrison	So
CB	35	Ali Abas	So
S	37	Nick Gallo	Jr
CB	39	Cameron Lewis	Sr
LB	42	Matt Otwinowski	Jr
S	45	Evan Gantley	Fr
LB	48	Fabian Weitz	Fr
DE	49	Taylor Riggins	So
DE	50	Malcolm Koonce	So
DE	51	Jaylin Nolden	Fr
DE	52	Ledarius Mack	Jr
DE	53	Eric Black	Fr
DT	54	DeShondrick Foxworth	Jr
DE	55	Kennedy Emesibe	Sr
LB	56	Nico Ruggiero	Jr
DE	60	Brian Boyne	Jr
DT	68	Christian Gonzalez	Jr
DL	90	Justin Brandon	Sr
DT	91	Eddie Wilson	Fr
DE	92	Chuck Harris	Sr
DT	93	Chibueze Onwuka	So
DE	94	Myles Nicholas	Sr
DT	95	Jake Khoury	Sr
DT	96	Eric Vesosky	Fr
DT	97	Atunaisa Vainikolo	Jr
DT	98	Wesley Scott	Sr
DE	99	Frendy Darelus	Fr

Special teams

Pos.	#	Name	Class
K	11	Alex McNulty	Fr
K	14	Michael Cummings	Jr
K	19	Adam Mitcheson	Sr
P	40	Evan Finegan	Fr
LS	57	Jeremiah Riordan	So

Head coach

- Lance Leipold

Coordinators/assistant coaches

- Rob Ianello (Associate head coach / recruiting coordinator / wide receivers)
- Brian Borland (defensive coordinator / safeties)
- Andy Kotelnicki (offensive coordinator / running backs)
- Daryl Agpalsa (offensive line)
- Alan Hensell (tight ends)
- Chris Simpson (linebackers)
- Tim Edwards (defensive tackles)
- Jim Zebrowski (Quarterbacks / Co-offensive coordinator / passing game coordinator)
- Roc Bellantoni (defensive ends / special teams coordinator)
- Taiwo Onatalu (Cornerbacks / co-special teams coordinator)
- Ryan Wilson (graduate assistant)
- Daniel Allen (graduate assistant)
- James Daniels (graduate assistant)
- Issac Reed (graduate assistant)

Legend

- (C) Team captain
- (S) Suspended
- (I) Ineligible
- Injured
- Redshirt

Roster
Last update: December 4, 2018
