= 2018 Northern Illinois Huskies football team =

American college football season

2018 Northern Illinois Huskies football

MAC champion MAC West Division champion

MAC Championship Game, W 30–29 vs. Buffalo

Boca Raton Bowl, L 13–37 vs. UAB
- Conference: Mid-American Conference
- West Division
- Record: 8–6 (6–2 MAC)
- Head coach: Rod Carey (6th season)
- Offensive coordinator: Mike Uremovich (3rd season)
- Offensive scheme: Multiple
- Defensive coordinator: Jeff Knowles (1st season)
- Base defense: 3–4
- MVP: Sutton Smith
- Captains: Max Scharping; Luke Shively; Josh Corcoran; Kyle Pugh; D. J. Brown
- Home stadium: Huskie Stadium

2018 Mid-American Conference football standings
	Conf.			Overall
Team	W		L	W		L
East Division
Buffalo x	7	–	1	10	–	4
Miami (OH)	6	–	2	6	–	6
Ohio	6	–	2	9	–	4
Akron	2	–	6	4	–	8
Bowling Green	2	–	6	3	–	9
Kent State	1	–	7	2	–	10
West Division
Northern Illinois x$	6	–	2	8	–	6
Western Michigan	5	–	3	7	–	6
Eastern Michigan	5	–	3	7	–	6
Toledo	5	–	3	7	–	6
Ball State	3	–	5	4	–	8
Central Michigan	0	–	8	1	–	11
Championship: Northern Illinois 30, Buffalo 29
$ – Conference champion; x – Division champion/co-champions

The 2018 Northern Illinois Huskies football team represented Northern Illinois University as a member of the West Division of the Mid-American Conference (MAC) during the 2018 NCAA Division I FBS football season. Led by Rod Carey in his sixth and final season as head coach, the Huskies compiled an overall record of 8–6 with a mark of 6–2 in conference play, winning the MAC's West Division title. Northern Illinois advanced to the MAC Championship Game, where they defeated East Division champion Buffalo to win the program's fifth MAC championship. The Huskies were invited to the Boca Raton Bowl, where they lost to UAB. The team played home games at Huskie Stadium in DeKalb, Illinois.

== Preseason ==
=== Award watch lists ===
Award	Player	Position	Year
Lott Trophy	Sutton Smith	DE	JR
Rimington Trophy	Luke Shively	C	SR
Chuck Bednarik Award	Sutton Smith	DE	JR
Bronko Nagurski Trophy	Sutton Smith	DE	JR
Outland Trophy	Max Scharping	T	SR
Wuerffel Trophy	Max Scharping	T	SR
Ted Hendricks Award	Sutton Smith	DE	JR

=== Preseason media poll ===
The MAC released their preseason media poll on July 24, 2018, with the Huskies predicted to finish as champions of the West Division.

== Schedule ==
Date	Time	Opponent	Site	TV	Result	Attendance
September 1	2:30 p.m.	at Iowa*	Kinnick Stadium; Iowa City, IA	BTN	L 7–33	67,510
September 8	6:30 p.m.	Utah*	Huskie Stadium; DeKalb, IL	ESPNews	L 6–17	16,762
September 15	2:30 p.m.	Central Michigan	Huskie Stadium; DeKalb, IL	ESPN+	W 24–16	12,354
September 22	3:30 p.m.	at Florida State*	Doak Campbell Stadium; Tallahassee, FL	ESPNU	L 19–37	65,633
September 29	5:00 p.m.	at Eastern Michigan	Rynearson Stadium; Ypsilanti, MI	ESPN+	W 26–23 ^{3OT}	14,779
October 6	3:00 p.m.	at Ball State	Scheumann Stadium; Muncie, IN (Bronze Stalk Trophy)	ESPN3	W 24–16	7,159
October 13	2:30 p.m.	Ohio	Huskie Stadium; DeKalb, IL	ESPN+	W 24–21	12,138
October 27	2:30 p.m.	at BYU*	LaVell Edwards Stadium; Provo, UT	ESPNU	W 7–6	51,084
November 1	6:00 p.m.	at Akron	InfoCision Stadium; Akron, OH	CBSSN	W 36–26	16,401
November 7	7:00 p.m.	Toledo	Huskie Stadium; DeKalb, IL	ESPN2	W 38–15	5,887
November 14	7:00 p.m.	Miami (OH)	Huskie Stadium; DeKalb, IL	ESPNU	L 7–13	4,878
November 20	6:00 p.m.	at Western Michigan	Waldo Stadium; Kalamazoo, MI	ESPNU	L 21–28	18,278
November 30	6:00 p.m.	vs. Buffalo	Ford Field; Detroit, MI (MAC Championship Game)	ESPN2	W 30–29	10,255
December 18	6:00 p.m.	vs. UAB*	FAU Stadium; Boca Raton, FL (Boca Raton Bowl)	ESPN	L 13–37	22,614
*Non-conference game; All times are in Central time

== Game summaries ==
=== At Iowa ===
Northern Illinois at Iowa

Team	1	2	3	4	Total
Northern Illinois	0	0	0	7	7
• Iowa	0	3	14	16	33

- Date: September 1, 2018
- Location:
  Kinnick Stadium
  Iowa City, IA
- Game start: 2:40 pm
- Elapsed time: 3:11
- Game attendance: 67,510
- Game weather: 80 °F (27 °C), Wind: 5-10 MPH SSW, Overcast
- Referee: Jeff Servinski
- TV announcers (BTN): Joe Beninati (Play-by-Play), Chuck Long (Analyst)

Scoring summary
Q2	12:20	IOWA	Miguel Recinos 33-yard field goal	3–0 IOWA
Q3	07:20	IOWA	Noah Fant 1-yard pass from Nate Stanley (Miguel Recinos kick)	10–0 IOWA
Q3	02:41	IOWA	I. Kelly-Martin 2-yard run (Miguel Recinos kick)	17–0 IOWA
Q4	13:02	IOWA	Toren Young 6-yard run (Miguel Recinos kick)	24–0 IOWA
Q4	07:59	IOWA	Team safety	26–0 IOWA
Q4	06:52	IOWA	Peyton Mansell 1-yard run (Miguel Recinos kick)	33–0 IOWA
Q4	02:12	NIU	Jauan Wesley 10-yard pass from Marcus Childers (Andrew Gantz kick)	33–7 IOWA

Series Record	Previous meeting	Result
1–8	August 31, 2013	NIU, 30–27

=== Utah ===
Utah at Northern Illinois

Team	1	2	3	4	Total
• Utah	0	0	7	10	17
Northern Illinois	3	0	0	3	6

- Date: September 8, 2018
- Location:
  Huskie Stadium
  DeKalb, IL
- Game attendance: 16,762
- TV announcers (ESPNews): Bill Roth (Play-by-Play), Mike Golic Jr. (Analyst)

Series Record	Previous meeting	Result
First meeting

=== Central Michigan ===
Central Michigan at Northern Illinois

Team	1	2	3	4	Total
Central Michigan	0	3	7	6	16
• Northern Illinois	0	14	7	3	24

- Location: Brigham Field at Huskie Stadium, DeKalb, Illinois
- Game attendance: 12,354

Series Record	Previous meeting	Result
15–17	November 24, 2017	CMU, 31–24

=== At Florida State ===
Northern Illinois at Florida State

Team	1	2	3	4	Total
Northern Illinois	0	7	6	6	19
• Florida State	14	6	3	14	37

- Date: September 22, 2018
- Location:
  Doak Campbell Stadium
  Tallahassee, FL
- Game attendance: 65,633

Series Record	Previous meeting	Result
0–1	January 1, 2013	FSU, 31–10

=== At Eastern Michigan ===
Northern Illinois at Eastern Michigan

Team	1	2	3	4	OT	2OT	3OT	Total
• Northern Illinois	3	10	0	0	7	0	6	26
Eastern Michigan	10	0	0	3	7	0	3	23

- Location: Rynearson Stadium, Ypsilanti, Michigan
- Game attendance: 14,779

Series Record	Previous meeting	Result
24–5–2	October 26, 2017	NIU, 30–27

=== At Ball State ===
Northern Illinois at Ball State

Team	1	2	3	4	Total
• Northern Illinois	7	7	7	3	24
Ball State	0	6	3	7	16

- Location: Scheumann Stadium, Muncie, Indiana
- Game attendance: 7,159

Series Record	Previous meeting	Result
17–18	November 9, 2017	NIU, 63–17

=== Ohio ===
Ohio at Northern Illinois

Team	1	2	3	4	Total
Ohio	0	7	14	0	21
• Northern Illinois	3	6	0	15	24

- Location: Brigham Field at Huskie Stadium, DeKalb, Illinois
- Game attendance: 12,138

Series Record	Previous meeting	Result
11–10	November 24, 2015	OHIO, 26–21

=== At BYU ===
Northern Illinois at BYU

Team	1	2	3	4	Total
• Northern Illinois	0	0	7	0	7
BYU	3	0	3	0	6

- Date: October 27, 2018
- Location:
  LaVell Edwards Stadium
  Provo, UT
- Game attendance: 51,084

Series Record	Previous meeting	Result
First meeting

=== At Akron ===
Northern Illinois at Akron

Team	1	2	3	4	Total
• Northern Illinois	7	17	5	7	36
Akron	7	3	16	0	26

- Date: November 1, 2018
- Location: Info Cision Stadium, Akron, Ohio
- Game start: 7:02 pm
- Elapsed time: 3:31
- Game attendance: 16,401
- Game weather: 48 °F (9 °C), Wind: 3 MPH ENE, Intermittent Showers
- Referee: Amanda S.-Cook

Series Record	Previous meeting	Result
8–5	October 12, 2013	NIU, 27–20

=== Toledo ===
Toledo at Northern Illinois

Team	1	2	3	4	Total
Toledo	3	6	0	6	15
• Northern Illinois	7	10	14	7	38

- Date: November 7, 2018
- Location: Brigham Field at Huskie Stadium, DeKalb, Illinois
- Game start: 7:05 pm
- Elapsed time: 3:15
- Game attendance: 5,887
- Game weather: 37 °F (3 °C), Wind: 6 MPH NNW, Intermittent Showers
- Referee: Ron Hudson
- Television network: ESPN2

Series Record	Previous meeting	Result
14–30	November 2, 2017	TOL, 27–17

=== Miami (OH) ===
Miami at Northern Illinois

Team	1	2	3	4	Total
• Miami	0	3	10	0	13
Northern Illinois	0	0	7	0	7

- Location: Brigham Field at Huskie Stadium, DeKalb, Illinois
- Game start: 7:00 p.m.
- Game attendance: 4,878
- Television network: ESPNU

Series Record	Previous meeting	Result
9–8	October 17, 2015	NIU, 45–12

=== At Western Michigan ===
Northern Illinois at Western Michigan

Team	1	2	3	4	Total
Northern Illinois	7	0	14	0	21
• Western Michigan	7	6	8	7	28

- Location: Waldo Stadium, Kalamazoo, Michigan
- Game start: 6:00 p.m.
- Game attendance: 18,278
- Television network: ESPNU

Series Record	Previous meeting	Result
19–23	November 15, 2018	NIU, 35–31

=== vs Buffalo (MAC Championship Game) ===
Northern Illinois vs Buffalo
(MAC Championship Game)

Team	1	2	3	4	Total
• Northern Illinois	0	10	7	13	30
Buffalo	7	15	7	0	29

- Location: Ford Field, Detroit, Michigan
- Game start: 6:00 p.m.
- Game attendance: 10,255
- Television network: ESPN2

Series Record	Previous meeting	Result
11–1	October 14, 2017	NIU, 14–13

=== vs UAB (Boca Raton Bowl) ===
UAB vs. Northern Illinois
(Boca Raton Bowl)

Team	1	2	3	4	Total
• UAB	10	17	10	0	37
Northern Illinois	7	3	3	0	13

- Date: December 18, 2018
- Location: FAU Stadium, Boca Raton, FL
- Game start: 7:00 p.m.
- Game attendance: 22,614
- Television network: ESPN

Series Record	Previous meeting	Result
First Meeting

== Coaching staff ==
Name	Title	Years at NIU
Rod Carey	Head coach	8
Jeff Knowles	Def. Coord./lb coach	6
Mike Uremovich	Off. Coord./Asst. Head Coach/TE/fb coach	3
Steve Crutchley	WR Coach	2
Craig Harmon	QB Coach	7
Melvin Rice	CB Coach	4
Joe Tripodi	OL Coach/Run Game Coord.	9
Walter Stewart	DL Coach	1
Tyler Yelk	Safeties Coach	1
Jake Landry	RB Coach	1
Dan Sabock	Special Teams Coord.	1

== Players drafted into the NFL ==
Round	Pick	Player	Position	NFL team
2	55	Max Scharping	Offensive tackle	Houston Texans
6	175	Sutton Smith	Linebacker	Pittsburgh Steelers
