= Sutton Smith =

American football player (born 1996)

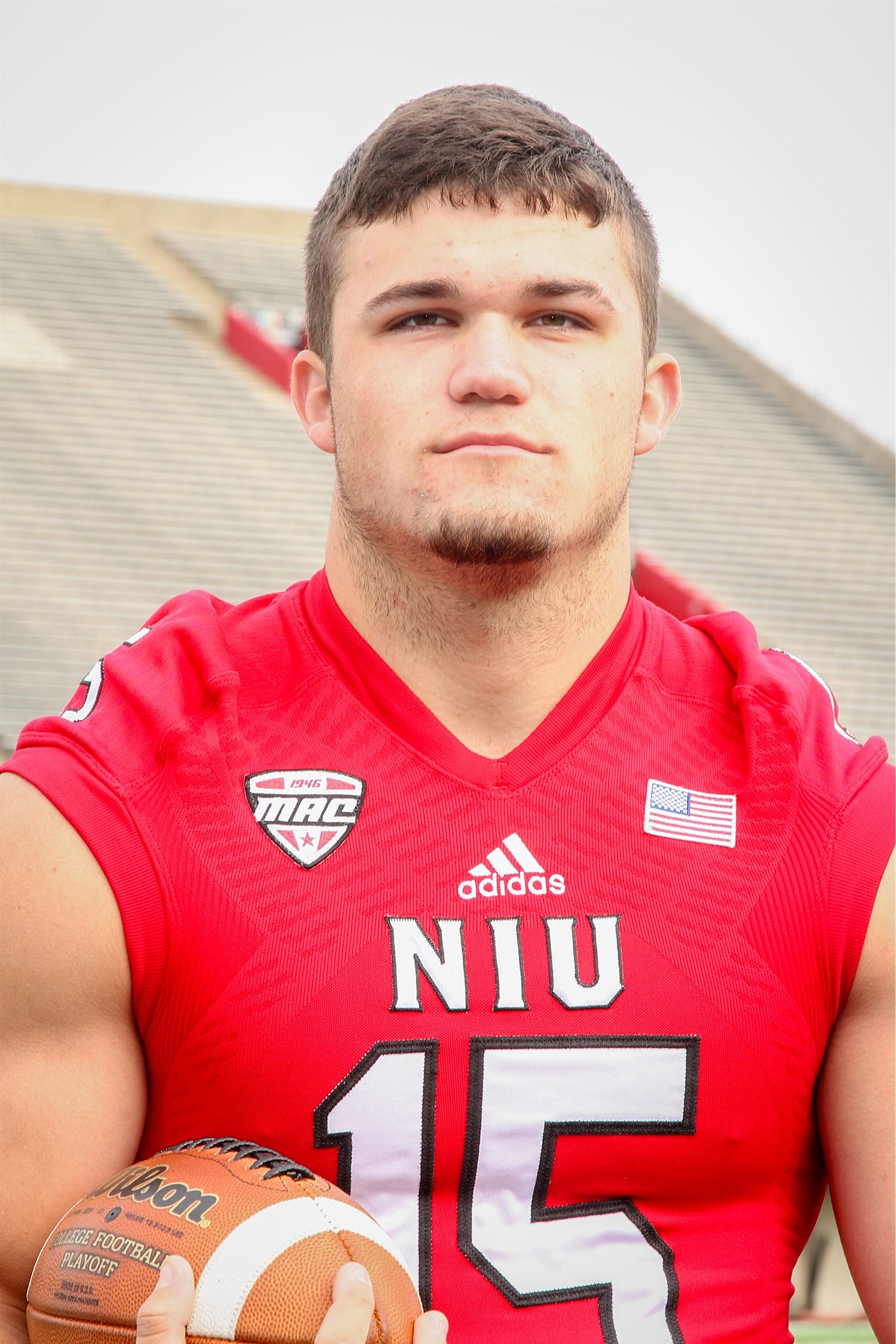
- Smith with the Northern Illinois Huskies

No. 41
- Position: Fullback

Personal information
- Born: March 22, 1996 (age 30); Plano, Texas, U.S.
- Listed height: 6 ft 0 in (1.83 m)
- Listed weight: 232 lb (105 kg)

Career information
- High school: Francis Howell (St. Charles, Missouri)
- College: Northern Illinois (2015–2018)
- NFL draft: 2019: 6th round, 175th overall pick

Career history
- Pittsburgh Steelers (2019)*; Jacksonville Jaguars (2019)*; Pittsburgh Steelers (2019)*; Seattle Seahawks (2019–2020)*; New Orleans Saints (2021)*; Las Vegas Raiders (2021)
- * Offseason or practice squad member only

Awards and highlights
- Consensus All-American (2017); 2× First-team All-American (2017, 2018); 2× First-team All-MAC (2017, 2018); 2× MAC Defensive POTY (2017, 2018); MAC Most Valuable Player (2018)
- Stats at Pro Football Reference

Sutton Smith (born March 22, 1996) is an American former professional football fullback. He played college football for the Northern Illinois Huskies, mainly as a linebacker.

== Early life ==
Smith played running back for Francis Howell High School in Saint Charles, Missouri. As a senior in 2014, Smith led the Vikings to an 11–1 record before losing to Rockhurst High School (Kansas City, MO) in the Class 6 semi-final playoff game. Smith rushed for 2,046 yards and scored 32 touchdowns, 27 were rushing touchdowns and was named a 1st Team All-State running back by the Missouri Football Coaches Association and the Missouri Sports Writers Association. Channel 5 (KSDK) named Smith their Large School Player of the Year and the St. Louis Post-Dispatch named him their All-Metro Offensive Player of the Year. In 2014 Smith was a top 20 recruit in the State of Missouri and was listed as a 3-star recruit by ESPN and 247Sports.

== College career ==
Smith redshirted his freshman season at Northern Illinois University (NIU), to focus on making the switch from running back to linebacker.

In his redshirt sophomore season, Smith led the nation in sacks (14), tackles for loss (29.5), and quarterback pressures (73). This led to him being a 2017 consensus All-American, including first team selections by the Walter Camp Foundation and the Football Writers Association of America. He was also named Mid-American Conference (MAC) defensive player of the year. Smith became the 2nd player in NIU history since LeShon Johnson in 1993 to be named a Consensus All-American. Smith broke NIU's single season tackles for loss record previously held by Scott Kellar (20). His Football Bowl Subdivision leading 14 quarterback sacks broke the single season sack record (12), previously held by Kellar (1984) and Larry English (2006). Smith was a finalist for the 2017 Ted Hendricks Award as the nation's best defensive end. The Maxwell Football Club named Smith a semi-finalist for the Chuck Bednarik Award, the nation's Most Outstanding Defensive Player of the Year.

In his redshirt junior season, Smith led the nation in tackles for loss (27) and was third in the nation in sacks (15). Smith helped lead the 2018 NIU Huskies to a MAC West Division championship as well as a 30-29 win over Buffalo in the 2018 Marathon MAC Championship Game. Following the game, Smith was named the game's Most Valuable Defensive player. For a second consecutive year, Smith was named a First-Team All-American, including first-team selections by the Associated Press, ESPN, SI.com, CollegeFootballNews.com and USA Today. Smith was a second-team selection by The Walter Camp Football Association, American Football Coaches Association, Pro Football Focus (PFF), and the Football Writers Association of America. Smith was also a finalist for the 2018 Ted Hendricks Award as the nation's best defensive end. PFF ranked Smith 24th on their list of the best 101 college football players in America. The MAC named Smith a First-Team Defensive End and MAC Defensive Player of the Year. Smith also won the Vern Smith Leadership Award which is the football MVP award for the MAC. Sutton Smith is only the third defensive player in the history of the MAC to win the Vern Smith MVP honor, joining Central Michigan linebacker Ray Bentley (1982) and NIU defensive end Larry English (2008).

On December 20, 2018, Smith announced that he would forgo his final year of eligibility to declare for the 2019 NFL draft.

During his collegiate career, Smith was a 2-time First-Team All-American, a 2-time First-Team MAC Defensive End, and 2-Time MAC Defensive Player of the Year. He is the only player in NIU school history to achieve these honors in back-to-back seasons and is the most decorated defensive player in NIU football history. In 2019, both Northern Illinois Football and the College Football Hall of Fame named Smith to their All-Decade Teams.

== Professional career ==
Pre-draft measurables
Height	Weight	Arm length	Hand span	40-yard dash	20-yard shuttle	Three-cone drill	Vertical jump	Broad jump	Bench press
6 ft 0 3/8 in (1.84 m)	233 lb (106 kg)	30 3/4 in (0.78 m)	9 in (0.23 m)	4.69 s	4.32 s	6.75 s	31.5 in (0.80 m)	9 ft 10 in (3.00 m)	25 reps
All values from NFL Combine

=== Pittsburgh Steelers (first stint) ===
Smith was drafted by the Pittsburgh Steelers in the sixth round, 175th overall, of the 2019 NFL Draft. He was waived on August 31, 2019.

=== Jacksonville Jaguars ===
On October 22, 2019, Smith was signed to the practice squad of the Jacksonville Jaguars, but was released a week later.

=== Pittsburgh Steelers (second stint) ===
On November 6, 2019, Smith was signed to the Steelers practice squad, but was released the next day. On November 12, he was re-signed to the practice squad. He was released on November 18.

=== Seattle Seahawks ===
On December 18, 2019, Smith was signed to the Seattle Seahawks practice squad. He signed a reserve/future contract with the Seahawks on January 14, 2020. He was waived on July 26, 2020.

=== New Orleans Saints ===
Smith signed with the New Orleans Saints on May 14, 2021. He was released on August 27, 2021.

=== Las Vegas Raiders ===
On November 15, 2021, Smith was signed to the Las Vegas Raiders practice squad, after a season-ending injury to fullback Alec Ingold. He was elevated to the active roster on November 21, and played in his first career NFL game, getting snaps on special teams vs the Cincinnati Bengals in week 11. He was elevated again for the week 12 game of the Raiders versus the Dallas Cowboys, before being signed to a two-year contract on December 3. He also played in week 13 against the Washington Football Team, in week 14 against the Kansas City Chiefs, and week 15 against the Cleveland Browns, mostly on special teams and limited snaps on offense, not registering a rushing attempt. He was released on May 20, 2022.
