= 2018 MAC Championship Game =

2018 Marathon MAC Championship Game
- 22nd MAC Championship Game
Northern Illinois Huskies	Buffalo Bulls
(7–5)	(10–2)
30	29
Head coach: Rod Carey	Head coach: Lance Leipold
	1	2	3	4	Total
Northern Illinois	0	10	7	13	30
Buffalo	7	15	7	0	29
- Date: November 30, 2018
- Season: 2018
- Stadium: Ford Field
- Location: Detroit, Michigan
- MVP: Offense: Marcus Childers (QB, NIU); Defense: Sutton Smith (LB, NIU)
- Favorite: Buffalo by 3
- Referee: Tim O'Dey
- Attendance: 10,255

United States TV coverage
- Network: ESPN2
- Announcers: Clay Matvick (Play-By-Play); Dan Orlovsky (Analyst); Paul Carcaterra (Sidelines)

2018 Mid-American Conference football standings
	Conf.			Overall
Team	W		L	W		L
East Division
Buffalo x	7	–	1	10	–	4
Miami (OH)	6	–	2	6	–	6
Ohio	6	–	2	9	–	4
Akron	2	–	6	4	–	8
Bowling Green	2	–	6	3	–	9
Kent State	1	–	7	2	–	10
West Division
Northern Illinois x$	6	–	2	8	–	6
Western Michigan	5	–	3	7	–	6
Eastern Michigan	5	–	3	7	–	6
Toledo	5	–	3	7	–	6
Ball State	3	–	5	4	–	8
Central Michigan	0	–	8	1	–	11
Championship: Northern Illinois 30, Buffalo 29
$ – Conference champion; x – Division champion/co-champions

The 2018 MAC Championship Game was an NCAA Division I college football conference championship game for the Mid-American Conference (MAC), that was played on November 30, 2018. It was the 22nd Mid-American Conference Championship, and was played at Ford Field in Detroit, Michigan. Sponsored by the Marathon Petroleum Corporation, the game was officially known as the Marathon MAC Championship Game. Northern Illinois scored the game's final 20 points to erase a 19-point second-half deficit and defeat Buffalo, 30–29.

== Teams ==
=== Northern Illinois Huskies ===
Northern Illinois went undefeated 6-0 in conference play, until the Huskies lost to Miami on November 14. The Huskies were able to clinch the West Division, after the last remaining contender, Western Michigan, lost their third conference game also that weekend, eliminating the Broncos from contention. Northern Illinois makes their first appearance in the title game since 2015.

=== Buffalo Bulls ===
Buffalo was able to clinch the East Division after defeating the Falcons of Bowling Green at the end of the season, compelling a conference record of 7-1. The Bulls make their first appearance in the game since 2008.

=== Buffalo vs. Northern Illinois series history ===
The match up was the 13th meeting against the Bulls and the Huskies. They last played each other last season in Amherst, New York. Northern Illinois defeated Buffalo in a close win of 14-13. After the 2016 match up, Northern Illinois lead the series, 11-1. Buffalo has not won against the Huskies since 1968. The championship game was the first time in history that the two schools played in post season.

== Game summary ==
=== Scoring summary ===
Scoring summary

Quarter	Time	Drive			Team	Scoring information	Score	
Quarter	Time	Plays	Yards	TOP	Team	Scoring information	NIU	BUFF
1	6:38	13	94	5:39	BUFF	Kevin Marks 3-yard touchdown run, Alex McNulty kick good	0	7
2	14:55	11	94	5:00	BUFF	Anthony Johnson 13-yard touchdown reception from Tyree Jackson, Alex McNulty kick failed	0	13
2	9:51	12	75	5:04	NIU	Spencer Tears 13-yard touchdown reception from Marcus Childers, Andrew Gantz kick good	7	13
2	5:41	9	75	4:10	BUFF	Anthony Johnson 26-yard touchdown reception from Tyree Jackson, 2-point pass failed	7	19
2	1:42	12	53	3:59	NIU	39-yard field goal by Andrew Gantz	10	19
2	0:03	8	70	1:34	BUFF	24-yard field goal by Adam Mitcheson	10	22
3	11:25	8	75	3:35	BUFF	Jaret Patterson 9-yard touchdown run, Adam Mitcheson kick good	10	29
3	0:17	5	34	1:41	NIU	D.J. Brown 28-yard touchdown reception from Marcus Childers, Andrew Gantz kick good	17	29
4	12:51	4	63	1:17	NIU	Spencer Tears 32-yard touchdown reception from Marcus Childers, Andrew Gantz kick good	24	29
4	1:09	8	70	2:11	NIU	D.J. Brown 35-yard touchdown reception from Marcus Childers, 2-point pass failed	30	29
"TOP" = time of possession. For other American football terms, see Glossary of American football.							30	29

=== Statistics ===
	1	2	3	4	Total
Huskies	0	10	7	13	30
Bulls	7	15	7	0	29

Statistics	NIU	BUFF
First downs	23	26
Plays–yards	67–409	77–394
Rushes–yards	34–109	42–142
Passing yards	300	252
Passing: Comp–Att–Int	21–33–1	18–35–0
Time of possession	24:55	35:05

Team	Category	Player	Statistics
Northern Illinois	Passing	Marcus Childers	21/33, 300 yds, 4 TD, 1 INT
Northern Illinois	Rushing	Marcus Childers	15 car, 58 yds
Northern Illinois	Receiving	Spencer Tears	6 rec, 73 yds, 2 TD
Buffalo	Passing	Tyree Jackson	18/35, 252 yds, 2 TD
Buffalo	Rushing	Kevin Marks	17 car, 72 yds, 1 TD
Buffalo	Receiving	Anthony Johnson	7 rec, 124 yds, 2 TD
