= MAC Football Championship Game =

Football game

- Sport: College football
- Conference: Mid-American Conference
- Current stadium: Ford Field
- Current location: Detroit, Michigan
- Played: 1997–present
- Last contest: 2025
- Current champion: Western Michigan Broncos
- Most championships: Marshall, Northern Illinois (5)
- TV partner: ESPN/ESPN2
- Official website: MAC-Sports.com football

Sponsors
- Marathon Petroleum (2003–2019); Rocket Mortgage (2020–2022)

Host stadiums
- Marshall University Stadium (1997–2000, 2002); Glass Bowl (2001); Doyt Perry Stadium (2003); Ford Field (2004–present)

Host locations
- Huntington, West Virginia (1997–2000, 2002); Toledo, Ohio (2001); Bowling Green, Ohio (2003); Detroit, Michigan (2004–present)

The MAC Football Championship Game is an annual postseason college football game played to determine the champion of the Mid-American Conference (MAC).

== History ==
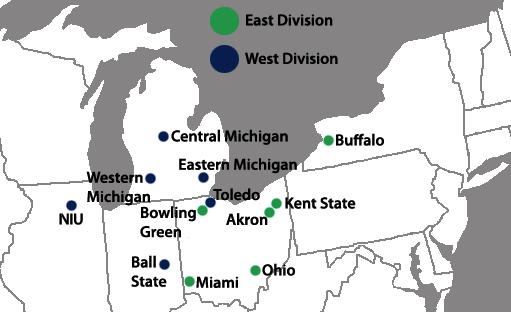
Locations of the full members of the Mid-American Conference.

The game has been played since 1997, when the conference was first divided into divisions. For the 2024 season the MAC eliminated divisions and the game now features the teams with the best conference records. A new tiebreaker system was established to compare teams with the same conference record. The winner of the game is guaranteed a berth in a bowl game which the MAC has contractual obligations to field a team. Unlike the MAC's Group of Five contemporaries, which hold their respective championship games on campus sites, the MAC Championship Game is held at a neutral site. Ford Field in Detroit has been the venue since 2004 and is scheduled to host through at least 2025.

In 2000, 2001, and 2007, due to an unbalanced conference schedule, the team with best division record within each division was awarded that division's championship game berth. In other years, the teams with the best overall conference records received a berth. Starting in 2024 the MAC will eliminate divisions and include the two teams with the best overall conference records.

The game is held on the first Saturday in December, on the same weekend that other NCAA Division I FBS conferences hold their championship games.

== Results ==
Below are the results from all MAC Football Championship Games played. The winning team appears in bold font, on a background of their primary team color. Rankings are from the AP Poll released prior to the game.

From 1997 through 2003, the championship game was played at campus sites. Since 2004, the game has been played at Ford Field in Detroit where it is scheduled to be held through at least 2025. From 1997 to 2015, a MAC Championship MVP award was given to a player from each team. Since 2016, three player were awarded a Player of the Game award: Offensive, Defensive and Special Teams.

Year	West Division		East Division		Site	Attendance	MVP(s)
1997	Toledo	14	**Marshall**	**34**	Marshall University Stadium • Huntington, WV	28,021	WR Randy Moss, Marshall; RB Dwayne Harris, Toledo
1998	Toledo	17	**Marshall**	**23**	Marshall University Stadium • Huntington, WV	28,085	QB Chad Pennington, Marshall; DL Gregg King, Toledo
1999	Western Michigan	30	11 **Marshall**	**34**	Marshall University Stadium • Huntington, WV	28,069	QB Chad Pennington, Marshall; QB Tim Lester, Western Michigan
2000	Western Michigan	14	**Marshall**	**19**	Marshall University Stadium • Huntington, WV	24,816	QB Byron Leftwich, Marshall; WR Steve Neal, Western Michigan
2001	**Toledo**	**41**	20 Marshall	36	Glass Bowl • Toledo, OH	20,025	WR Denero Marriott, Marshall, WR; RB Chester Taylor, Toledo
2002	Toledo	45	24 **Marshall**	**49**	Marshall University Stadium • Huntington, WV	24,582	QB Byron Leftwich, Marshall; RB Trinity Dawson, Toledo
2003	20 Bowling Green	27	13 **Miami (OH)**	**49**	Doyt Perry Stadium • Bowling Green, OH	24,813	QB Ben Roethlisberger, Miami, QB; QB Josh Harris, Bowling Green
2004	**Toledo**	**35**	Miami (OH)	27	Ford Field • Detroit, MI	22,138	WR Michael Larkin, Miami; QB Bruce Gradkowski, Toledo
2005	Northern Illinois	30	**Akron**	**31**	Ford Field • Detroit, MI	12,051	QB Luke Getsy, Akron, QB; TB Garrett Wolfe, Northern Illinois
2006	**Central Michigan**	**31**	Ohio	10	Ford Field • Detroit, MI	25,483	DL Jameson Hartke, Ohio; WR Damien Linson, Central Michigan
2007	**Central Michigan**	**35**	Miami (OH)	10	Ford Field • Detroit, MI	25,013	LB Clayton Mullins, Miami; QB Dan LeFevour, Central Michigan
2008	12 Ball State	24	**Buffalo**	**42**	Ford Field • Detroit, MI	12,871	DB Mike Newton, Buffalo; QB Nate Davis, Ball State
2009	**Central Michigan**	**20**	Ohio Bobcats	10	Ford Field • Detroit, MI	23,714	LB Noah Keller, Ohio, LB; QB Dan LeFevour, Central Michigan
2010	24 Northern Illinois	21	**Miami (OH)**	**26**	Ford Field • Detroit, MI	12,031	RB Tom Merriweather, Miami; QB Chandler Harnish, Northern Illinois
2011	**Northern Illinois**	**23**	Ohio	20	Ford Field • Detroit, MI	13,052	LB Noah Keller, Ohio; WR Nathan Palmer, Northern Illinois
2012	19 **Northern Illinois**	**44**^{2OT}	18 Kent State	37	Ford Field • Detroit, MI	18,132	DB Darius Polk, Kent State, DB; QB Jordan Lynch, Northern Illinois
2013	16 Northern Illinois	27	**Bowling Green**	**47**	Ford Field • Detroit, MI	21,106	QB Matt Johnson, Bowling Green; QB Jordan Lynch, Northern Illinois
2014	**Northern Illinois**	**51**	Bowling Green	17	Ford Field • Detroit, MI	15,110	WR Gehrig Dieter, Bowling Green; QB Drew Hare, Northern Illinois
2015	Northern Illinois	14	**Bowling Green**	**34**	Ford Field • Detroit, MI	16,425	DB Shawun Lurry, Northern Illinois; RB Travis Greene, Bowling Green
2016	13 **Western Michigan**	**29**	Ohio	23	Ford Field • Detroit, MI	45,615	Offensive: Corey Davis (Western Michigan); Defensive: Bradd Ellis (Ohio); Special Teams: Butch Hampton (Western Michigan)
2017	**Toledo**	**45**	Akron	28	Ford Field • Detroit, MI	16,225	Offensive: Logan Woodside (Toledo); Defensive: Ulysees Gilbert (Akron); Special Teams: Danzel McKinley-Lewis (Toledo)
2018	**Northern Illinois**	**30**	Buffalo	29	Ford Field • Detroit, MI	10,255	Offensive: Marcus Childers (NIU); Defensive: Sutton Smith (NIU); Special Teams: Matt Ference (NIU)
2019	Central Michigan	21	**Miami (OH)**	**26**	Ford Field • Detroit, MI	22,427	Offensive: Jack Sorenson (Miami); Defensive: Emmanuel Rugamba (Miami); Special Teams: Sam Sloman (Miami)
2020	**Ball State**	**38**	23 Buffalo	28	Ford Field • Detroit, MI	0 ‡	Offensive: Drew Plitt (Ball State); Defensive: Jimmy Daw (Ball State); Special Teams: Nathan Snyder (Ball State)
2021	**Northern Illinois**	**41**	Kent State	23	Ford Field • Detroit, MI	10,317	Offensive: Jay Ducker (NIU); Defensive: CJ Brown (NIU); Special Teams: John Richardson (NIU)
2022	**Toledo**	**17**	Ohio	7	Ford Field • Detroit, MI	15,550	Offensive: QB Dequan Finn (Toledo); Defensive: LB Dyontae Johnson (Toledo); Special Teams: P Jonathon Batzke (Toledo)
2023	Toledo	14	**Miami (OH)**	**23**	Ford Field • Detroit, MI	20,200	Offensive: QB Aveon Smith (Miami); Defensive: LB Matt Salopek (Miami); Special Teams: PK Graham Nicholson (Miami)
Year	No. 1 seed		No. 2 seed		Site	Attendance	MVP
2024	Miami (OH)	3	**Ohio**	**38**	Ford Field • Detroit, MI	15,478	Offensive: QB Parker Navarro (Ohio); Defensive: LB Bradley Weaver (Ohio); Special Teams: PK Gianni Spetic (Ohio)
2025	**Western Michigan**	**23**	Miami (OH)	13	Ford Field • Detroit, MI	19,114	Offensive: RB Jalen Buckley (Western Michigan); Defensive: DE Nadame Tucker (Western Michigan); Special Teams: K Palmer Domschke (Western Michigan)
2026					Ford Field • Detroit, MI		

‡ 2020 game attendance was played behind closed doors due to the COVID-19 pandemic.

=== Results by team ===
==== Current members ====
Appearances	School	Wins	Losses	Win %	Year(s) Won	Year(s) Lost
8	Toledo	4	4	.500	2001, 2004, 2017, 2022	1997, 1998, 2002, 2023
8	Miami (OH)	4	4	.500	2003, 2010, 2019, 2023	2004, 2007, 2024, 2025
6	Ohio	1	5	.167	2024	2006, 2009, 2011, 2016, 2022
4	Central Michigan	3	1	.750	2006, 2007, 2009	2019
4	Bowling Green	2	2	.500	2013, 2015	2003, 2014
4	Western Michigan	2	2	.500	2016, 2025	1999, 2000
3	Buffalo	1	2	.333	2008	2018, 2020
2	Akron	1	1	.500	2005	2017
2	Ball State	1	1	.500	2020	2008
2	Kent State	0	2	.000		2012, 2021
0	Eastern Michigan	0	0	–		
0	Sacramento State	0	0	–		
0	UMass	0	0	–		

==== Former members ====
Appearances	School	Wins	Losses	Win %	Year(s) Won	Year(s) Lost
9	Northern Illinois	5	4	.556	2011, 2012, 2014, 2018, 2021	2005, 2010, 2013, 2015
6	Marshall	5	1	.833	1997, 1998, 1999, 2000, 2002	2001

=== No results by team ===
School
Temple
UCF

Eastern Michigan, Sacramento State and UMass are the only teams currently in the conference to have not yet qualified for a championship game. (UMass had been a football-only MAC member in the 2012–2015 seasons before returning in 2025 as a full member.) As of the next MAC football season in 2026, Marshall and Northern Illinois are the only championship game winners to not be current members of the MAC. Bowling Green is the only team that has represented both the East and West Divisions in the Championship Game, as it was a member of the West Division prior to the departure of Marshall from the MAC. Temple and UCF were previously in the conference during this era and never reached the championship game.

=== Common matchups ===
Matchups that have occurred more than once:

# of Times	East Division	West Division	Record	Years played
4	Marshall	Toledo	Marshall, 3–1	1997, 1998, 2001, 2002
3	Bowling Green	Northern Illinois	Bowling Green, 2–1	2013, 2014, 2015
2	Marshall	Western Michigan	Marshall, 2–0	1999, 2000
2	Ohio	Central Michigan	Central Michigan, 2–0	2006, 2009
2	Miami	Central Michigan	Tied, 1–1	2007, 2019
2	Buffalo	Ball State	Tied, 1–1	2008, 2020
2	Kent State	Northern Illinois	Northern Illinois, 2–0	2012, 2021

=== Rematches ===
The MAC Football Championship game has featured a rematch of a regular-season game a total of ten times (1999, 2000, 2003, 2004, 2005, 2017, 2021, 2023, 2024, 2025). The team which won the regular-season game is 4–6 in the rematches, winning in 1999, 2003, 2005, and 2017 but losing in 2000, 2004, 2021, 2023, 2024, 2025.

== MVPs ==
Year	MVP(s)	Team	Position
1997	Randy Moss	Marshall	WR
1998	Chad Pennington	Marshall	QB
1999	Chad Pennington	Marshall	QB
2000	Byron Leftwich	Marshall	QB
2001	Chester Taylor	Toledo	RB
2002	Byron Leftwich	Marshall	QB
2003	Ben Roethlisberger	Miami	QB
2004	Bruce Gradkowski	Toledo	QB
2005	Luke Getsy	Akron	QB
2006	Damien Linson	Central Michigan	WR
2007	Dan LeFevour	Central Michigan	QB
2008	Mike Newton	Buffalo	DB
2009	Dan LeFevour	Central Michigan	QB
2010	Thomas Merriweather	Miami	RB
2011	Nathan Palmer	Northern Illinois	WR
2012	Jordan Lynch	Northern Illinois	QB
2013	Matt Johnson	Bowling Green	QB
2014	Drew Hare	Northern Illinois	QB
2015	Travis Greene	Bowling Green	RB
2016	Corey Davis	Western Michigan	WR
2017	Logan Woodside	Toledo	QB (Offensive)
2017	Danzel McKinley-Lewis	Toledo	WR (Special Teams)
2018	Marcus Childers	Northern Illinois	QB (Offensive)
2018	Sutton Smith	Northern Illinois	LB (Defensive)
2019	Jack Sorenson	Miami	WR (Offensive)
2019	Emmanuel Rugamba	Miami	LB (Defensive)
2020	Drew Plitt	Ball State	QB (Offensive)
2020	Jimmy Daw	Ball State	LB (Defensive)
2021	Jay Ducker	Northern Illinois	RB (Offensive)
2021	C.J. Brown	Northern Illinois	DB (Defensive)
2021	John Richardson	Northern Illinois	PK (Special Teams)
2022	Dequan Finn	Toledo	QB (Offensive)
2022	Dyontae Johnson	Toledo	LB (Defensive)
2022	Jonathon Batzke	Toledo	P (Special Teams)
2023	Aveon Smith	Miami	QB (Offensive)
2023	Matt Salopek	Miami	LB (Defensive)
2023	Graham Nicholson	Miami	K (Special Teams)
2024	Parker Navarro	Ohio	QB (Offensive)
2024	Bradley Weaver	Ohio	DE (Defensive)
2024	Gianni Spetic	Ohio	K (Special Teams)
2025	Jalen Buckley	Western Michigan	RB (Offensive)
2025	Nadame Tucker	Western Michigan	DE (Defensive)
2025	Palmer Domschke	Western Michigan	K (Special Teams)

== Game records ==
Team	Record, Team vs. Opponent	Year
Most points scored (one team)	51, Northern Illinois vs. Bowling Green	2014
Most points scored (losing team)	45, Toledo vs. Marshall	2002
Fewest points scored (winning team)	17, Toledo vs. Ohio	2022
Fewest points scored	3, Miami vs. Ohio	2024
Most points scored (both teams)	94, Marshall (49) vs. Toledo (45)	2002
Fewest points scored (both teams)	24, Toledo (17) vs. Ohio (7)	2022
Most points scored in a half	35, Buffalo (2nd half) vs. Ball State; Ball State (1st half) vs. Buffalo	2008; 2020
Most points scored in a half (both teams)	49, Marshall vs. Toledo (2nd half)	2002
Largest margin of victory	35, Ohio (38) vs. Miami (3)	2024
Smallest margin of victory	1, Akron (31) vs. Northern Illinois (30); Northern Illinois (30) vs. Buffalo (29)	2005; 2018
Total yards	576, Miami (440 passing, 136 rushing) vs. Bowling Green	2003
Rushing yards	334, Northern Illinois vs. Bowling Green	2014
Passing yards	440, Miami vs. Bowling Green	2003
First downs	32, Ohio vs. Miami	2024
Fewest yards allowed	189, Ohio vs. Miami (127 passing, 62 rushing)	2024
Fewest rushing yards allowed	37, Western Michigan vs. Ohio	2016
Fewest passing yards allowed	102, Kent State vs. Northern Illinois	2021
Individual	Record, Player, Team vs. Opponent	Year
All-purpose yards	448, Ben Roethlisberger, Miami vs. Bowling Green	2003
Touchdowns (all-purpose)	5, Matt Johnson, Bowling Green vs. Northern Illinois	2013
Rushing yards	270, Garrett Wolfe, Northern Illinois vs. Akron	2005
Rushing touchdowns	4, Trinity Dawson, Toledo vs. Marshall	2002
Passing yards	440, Ben Roethlisberger, Miami vs. Bowling Green	2003
Passing touchdowns	5, Matt Johnson, Bowling Green vs. Northern Illinois	2013
Receiving yards	191, Damien Linson, Central Michigan vs. Ohio	2006
Receiving touchdowns	4, Denero Marriott, Marshall vs. Toledo	2001
Tackles	17, Ty Wise, Miami vs. Ohio	2024
Sacks	2.5, Nadame Tucker, Western Michigan vs. Miami	2025
Interceptions	2, Dechane Durante, Northern Illinois vs. Bowling Green	2014
Long Plays	Record, Player, Team vs. Opponent	Year
Touchdown run	96, Ontario Sneed, Central Michigan vs. Ohio	2006
Touchdown pass	86, Randy Moss from Chad Pennington, Marshall vs. Toledo	1997
Kickoff return	64, Clint Stephens, Bowling Green vs. Northern Illinois	2014
Punt return	48, Danzel McKinley-Lewis, Toledo vs. Akron	2017
Interception return	64, Shawun Lurry, Northern Illinois vs. Bowling Green	2015
Fumble return	92, Mike Newton, Buffalo vs. Ball State	2008
Punt	75, Curtis Head, Marshall vs. Toledo	2001
Field goal	52, shared by: Chris Nendick, Northern Illinois vs. Akron; Tyler Tate, Bowling Green vs. Northern Illinois; Gianni Spetic, Ohio vs. Miami	2005; 2013; 2024
Miscellaneous	Record, Team vs. Team	Year
Game attendance	45,615, Ohio vs. Western Michigan	2016

== Photo gallery ==
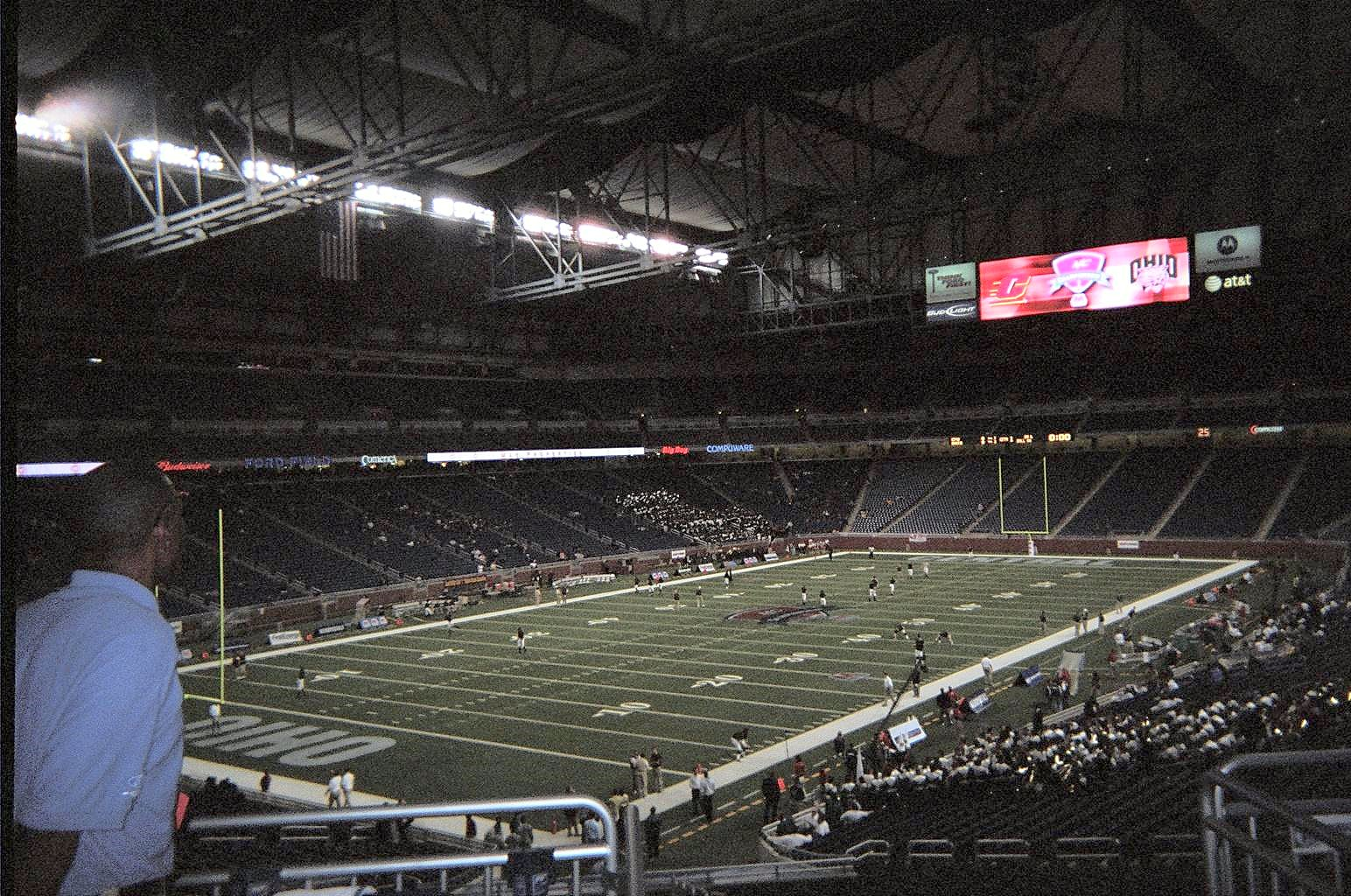
Before 2006 MAC Championship Game

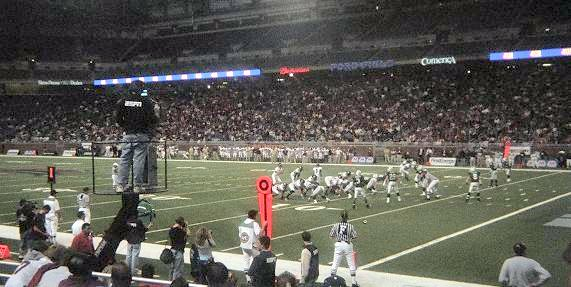
2006 MAC Championship: Central Michigan vs. Ohio

== See also ==
- List of NCAA Division I FBS conference championship games
