= Western Michigan Broncos football statistical leaders =

The Western Michigan Broncos football statistical leaders are individual statistical leaders of the Western Michigan Broncos football program in various categories, including passing, rushing, receiving, total offense, defensive stats, and kicking. Within those areas, the lists identify single-game, single-season, and career leaders. The Broncos represent Western Michigan University in the NCAA's Mid-American Conference.

Although Western Michigan began competing in intercollegiate football in 1906, the school's official record book does not generally include entries from before the 1950s, as records from before this year are often incomplete and inconsistent.

These lists are dominated by more recent players for several reasons:

- Since the 1950s, seasons have increased from 10 games to 11 and then 12 games in length.
- The NCAA did not allow freshmen to play varsity football until 1972 (with the exception of the World War II years), allowing players to have four-year careers.
- Bowl games only began counting toward single-season and career statistics in 2002. The Broncos have played in seven bowl games since this decision, allowing many recent players an extra game to accumulate statistics.
- Similarly, Western Michigan has played in the MAC Championship Game three times, giving yet another game to players in those seasons.

These lists are updated through the end of the 2025 season.

== Passing ==
=== Passing yards ===
Career
Rank	Player	Yards	Years
1	Zach Terrell	12,100	2013 2014 2015 2016
2	Tim Hiller	11,329	2005 2007 2008 2009
3	Tim Lester	11,299	1996 1997 1998 1999
4	Alex Carder	8,886	2009 2010 2011 2012
5	Brad Tayles	8,717	1989 1990 1991 1992
6	Jon Wassink	6,482	2015 2017 2018 2019
7	Jay McDonagh	6,148	1993 1994 1995
8	Kaleb Eleby	6,084	2018 2020 2021
9	Jeff Welsh	4,849	1997 1999 2000 2001
10	Ryan Cubit	4,699	2004 2005 2006

Single season
Rank	Player	Yards	Year
1	Alex Carder	3,873	2011
2	Tim Hiller	3,725	2008
3	Tim Lester	3,639	1999
4	Zach Terrell	3,533	2016
5	Zach Terrell	3,526	2015
6	Zach Terrell	3,443	2014
7	Alex Carder	3,334	2010
8	Tim Lester	3,311	1998
9	Kaleb Eleby	3,277	2021
10	Tim Hiller	3,249	2009

Single game
Rank	Player	Yards	Year	Opponent
1	Alex Carder	548	2011	Toledo
2	Alex Carder	479	2011	Connecticut
3	Tim Hiller	471	2008	Central Michigan
4	Chad Munson	450	2003	William & Mary
5	Zach Terrell	445	2016	Buffalo
6	Alex Carder	439	2011	Purdue (Little Caesars Pizza Bowl)
	Jon Wassink	439	2018	Miami (OH)
8	Tim Lester	435	1998	Bowling Green
9	Tim Lester	432	1998	Eastern Michigan
10	Alex Carder	429	2011	Miami

=== Passing touchdowns ===
Career
Rank	Player	TDs	Years
1	Tim Hiller	99	2005 2007 2008 2009
2	Zach Terrell	96	2013 2014 2015 2016
3	Tim Lester	87	1996 1997 1998 1999
4	Alex Carder	74	2009 2010 2011 2012
5	Jon Wassink	50	2015 2017 2018 2019
6	Brad Tayles	49	1989 1990 1991 1992
7	Jay McDonagh	45	1993 1994 1995
	Kaleb Eleby	45	2018 2020 2021
9	Ryan Cubit	36	2004 2005 2006
10	Norm Harris	35	1948 1949 1950

Single season
Rank	Player	TDs	Year
1	Tim Hiller	36	2008
2	Tim Lester	34	1999
3	Zach Terrell	33	2016
4	Alex Carder	31	2011
5	Alex Carder	30	2010
6	Zach Terrell	27	2015
7	Zach Terrell	26	2014
8	Tim Hiller	23	2009
	Kaleb Eleby	23	2021
10	Tim Lester	22	1998

Single game
Rank	Player	TDs	Year	Opponent
1	Alex Carder	7	2011	Toledo
2	Chad Munson	6	2003	William & Mary
	Tyler Van Tubbergen	6	2011	Akron
4	13 times by 9 players	5	Most recent: Kaleb Eleby vs. Northern Illinois, 2021	

== Rushing ==
=== Rushing yards ===
Career
Rank	Player	Yards	Years
1	Jarvion Franklin	4,867	2014 2015 2016 2017
2	Robert Sanford	4,219	1997 1998 1999 2000
3	Jerome Persell	4,190	1976 1977 1978
4	LeVante Bellamy	3,720	2015 2016 2017 2018 2019
5	Brandon West	3,671	2006 2007 2008 2009
6	Shawn Faulkner	3,341	1980 1981 1982 1983
7	Jim Vackaro	3,045	1992 1993 1994 1995
8	Sean Tyler	2,830	2019 2020 2021 2022
9	Jalen Buckley	2,716	2022 2023 2024 2025
10	Bobby Howard	2,608	1977 1978 1979 1980

Single season
Rank	Player	Yards	Year
1	Shawn Faulkner	1,668	1983
2	Robert Sanford	1,571	2000
3	Jarvion Franklin	1,551	2014
4	Jerome Persell	1,505	1976
5	LeVante Bellamy	1,472	2019
6	Jarvion Franklin	1,353	2016
7	Jerome Persell	1,346	1978
8	Jerome Persell	1,339	1977
9	Jarvion Franklin	1,228	2017
	LeVante Bellamy	1,228	2018

Single game
Rank	Player	Yards	Year	Opponent
1	Jarvion Franklin	281	2016	Akron
2	Lovell Coleman	279	1958	Central Michigan
3	Sam Dunlap	247	1916	Ohio Northern
4	Jerome Persell	241	1976	Eastern Michigan
5	Jarvion Franklin	228	2017	Central Michigan
6	Jamauri Bogan	215	2015	Middle Tennessee (Bahamas Bowl)
7	LeVante Bellamy	213	2018	Ball State
8	Jarvion Franklin	211	2014	Idaho

=== Rushing touchdowns ===
Career
Rank	Player	TDs	Years
1	Jarvion Franklin	52	2014 2015 2016 2017
2	Jamauri Bogan	43	2015 2016 2017 2018
3	Jerome Persell	39	1976 1977 1978
4	LeVante Bellamy	35	2015 2016 2017 2018 2019
5	Robert Sanford	30	1997 1998 1999 2000
6	Jalen Buckley	28	2022 2023 2024 2025
7	Larry Cates	25	1971 1972 1973
	Brandon West	25	2006 2007 2008 2009
9	Albert Little	23	1976 1977 1978 1979
	Jim Vackaro	23	1992 1993 1994 1995
	Sean Tyler	23	2019 2020 2021 2022

Single season
Rank	Player	TDs	Year
1	Jarvion Franklin	24	2014
2	LeVante Bellamy	23	2019
3	Jerome Persell	19	1976
4	Robert Sanford	18	2000
5	Jamauri Bogan	16	2015
6	Jamauri Bogan	15	2018
7	Jerome Persell	14	1977
	Broc Lowry	14	2025
9	Roger Lawson	13	1970
	Larry Cates	13	1971
	Robert Davis	13	1988

== Receiving ==
=== Receptions ===
Career
Rank	Player	Rec	Years
1	Corey Davis	332	2013 2014 2015 2016
2	Jordan White	306	2007 2009 2010 2011
3	Jamarko Simmons	260	2005 2006 2007 2008
4	Greg Jennings	238	2002 2003 2004 2005
5	Steve Neal	235	1997 1998 1999 2000
6	Daniel Braverman	212	2013 2014 2015
7	Juan Nunez	190	2007 2008 2009 2010
8	Skyy Moore	171	2019 2020 2021
9	Kendrick Mosley	163	1999 2000 2001 2002
10	Andre Wallace	157	1991 1992 1993 1994

Single season
Rank	Player	Rec	Year
1	Jordan White	140	2011
2	Daniel Braverman	108	2015
3	Jamarko Simmons	104	2008
4	Greg Jennings	98	2005
5	Corey Davis	97	2016
6	Skyy Moore	95	2021
7	Jordan White	94	2010
8	Juan Nunez	91	2010
9	Corey Davis	89	2015
10	Daniel Braverman	86	2014

Single game
Rank	Player	Rec	Year	Opponent
1	Jamie Hence	16	1987	Ohio
	Greg Jennings	16	2005	Virginia
	Jordan White	16	2011	Toledo
4	Tony Knox	15	1997	West Virginia
5	8 times by 7 players	14	Most recent: Kenneth Womack vs. Ohio, 2023	

=== Receiving yards ===
Career
Rank	Player	Yards	Years
1	Corey Davis	5,285	2013 2014 2015 2016
2	Jordan White	4,187	2007 2009 2010 2011
3	Steve Neal	3,599	1997 1998 1999 2000
4	Greg Jennings	3,539	2002 2003 2004 2005
5	Jamarko Simmons	3,019	2005 2006 2007 2008
6	Daniel Braverman	2,499	2013 2014 2015
7	Skyy Moore	2,482	2019 2020 2021
8	Corey Alston	2,456	1997 1998 1999 2000
9	Juan Nunez	2,337	2007 2008 2009 2010
10	D'Wayne Eskridge	2,260	2016 2017 2018 2019 2020

Single season
Rank	Player	Yards	Year
1	Jordan White	1,911	2011
2	Corey Davis	1,500	2016
3	Corey Davis	1,436	2015
4	Corey Davis	1,408	2014
5	Jordan White	1,378	2010
6	Daniel Braverman	1,371	2015
7	Skyy Moore	1,292	2021
8	Jamarko Simmons	1,276	2008
9	Greg Jennings	1,259	2005
10	Steve Neal	1,121	1998

Single game
Rank	Player	Yards	Year	Opponent
1	Corey Davis	272	2016	Ball State
2	Jordan White	265	2011	Purdue (Little Caesars Pizza Bowl)
3	Corey Alston	263	1997	Eastern Michigan
4	Greg Jennings	244	2005	Ball State
4	Greg Jennings	244	2005	Ball State
5	Dee Eskridge	240	2018	Syracuse
6	Jordan White	238	2011	Toledo
7	Corey Davis	212	2014	Ohio
	D'Wayne Eskridge	212	2020	Central Michigan
9	Skyy Moore	206	2021	Northern Illinois
10	Bob Phillips	203	1981	Ohio

=== Receiving touchdowns ===
Career
Rank	Player	TDs	Years
1	Corey Davis	52	2013 2014 2015 2016
2	Greg Jennings	39	2002 2003 2004 2005
3	Jordan White	32	2007 2009 2010 2011
4	Steve Neal	27	1997 1998 1999 2000
5	Corey Alston	25	1997 1998 1999 2000
6	Juan Nunez	24	2007 2008 2009 2010
7	Branden Ledbetter	20	2005 2006 2007 2008
8	Allan Boyko	19	1987 1988 1989 1990
	Daniel Braverman	19	2013 2014 2015
10	Jamarko Simmons	17	2005 2006 2007 2008

Single season
Rank	Player	TDs	Year
1	Corey Davis	19	2016
2	Jordan White	17	2011
3	Greg Jennings	14	2005
4	Greg Jennings	14	2003
5	Daniel Braverman	13	2015
6	Corey Davis	12	2015
7	Steve Neal	11	1999
	Greg Jennings	11	2004
9	Allan Boyko	10	1990
	Juan Nunez	10	2010
	Jordan White	10	2010
	Skyy Moore	10	2021

Single game
Rank	Player	TDs	Year	Opponent
1	Greg Jennings	4	2005	Ball State
	Jayden Reed	4	2018	Miami (OH)
	Skyy Moore	4	2021	Northern Illinois
4	Corey Davis	3	2015	Ball State
	Daniel Braverman	3	2015	Central Michigan
	Jordan White	3	2011	Toledo
	Juan Nunez	3	2010	Akron
	Greg Jennings	3	2003	Central Michigan
	Steve Neal	3	1999	Eastern Michigan
	Steve Neal	3	1999	Missouri
	George Mesko	3	1949	Central Michigan
	Al Bellile	3	1968	West Texas State
	Corey Davis	3	2016	North Carolina Central
	Corey Davis	3	2016	Ball State
	D'Wayne Eskridge	3	2020	Central Michigan
	Anthony Sambucci	3	2023	Ball State
	Blake Bosma	3	2024	Buffalo

== Total offense ==
Total offense is the sum of passing and rushing statistics. It does not include receiving or returns.

=== Total offense yards ===
Career
Rank	Player	Yards	Years
1	Zach Terrell	12,720	2013 2014 2015 2016
2	Tim Hiller	11,220	2005 2007 2008 2009
3	Tim Lester	11,081	1996 1997 1998 1999
4	Alex Carder	9,116	2009 2010 2011 2012
5	Brad Tayles	9,071	1989 1990 1991 1992
6	Jay McDonagh	6,915	1993 1994 1995
7	Kaleb Eleby	6,159	2018 2020 2021
8	Jarvion Franklin	4,867	2014 2015 2016 2017
9	Jeff Welsh	4,805	1997 1999 2000 2001
10	Ryan Cubit	4,599	2004 2005 2006

Single season
Rank	Player	Yards	Year
1	Alex Carder	4,143	2011
2	Zach Terrell	3,782	2016
3	Tim Hiller	3,727	2008
4	Zach Terrell	3,707	2014
5	Zach Terrell	3,654	2015
6	Tim Lester	3,604	1999
7	Alex Carder	3,560	2010
8	Kaleb Eleby	3,341	2021
9	Tim Lester	3,262	1998
10	Tim Hiller	3,148	2009

Single game
Rank	Player	Yards	Year	Opponent
1	Alex Carder	564	2011	Toledo
2	Alex Carder	478	2011	Connecticut
3	Jon Wassink	477	2018	Miami (OH)
4	Zach Terrell	469	2016	Buffalo
5	Tony Kimbrough	468	1988	Fresno State (California Bowl)
6	Tim Hiller	465	2008	Central Michigan
7	Chad Munson	464	2003	William & Mary
8	Alex Carder	456	2011	Purdue (Little Caesars Pizza Bowl)
9	Alex Carder	448	2011	Miami (OH)
10	Tim Lester	447	1998	Bowling Green

=== Total touchdowns ===
Career
Rank	Player	TDs	Years
1	Zach Terrell	109	2013 2014 2015 2016
2	Tim Hiller	103	2005 2007 2008 2009
3	Tim Lester	91	1996 1997 1998 1999
4	Alex Carder	84	2009 2010 2011 2012
5	Brad Tayles	62	1989 1990 1991 1992
6	Kaleb Eleby	58	2018 2020 2021
7	Jay McDonagh	52	1993 1994 1995
8	Jon Wassink	44	2015 2017 2018 2019
9	Jerome Persell	39	1976 1977 1978
10	Jeff Welsh	38	1997 1999 2000 2001

Single season
Rank	Player	TDs	Year
1	Zach Terrell	40	2016
2	Tim Hiller	37	2008
3	Alex Carder	36	2010
4	Tim Lester	35	1999
	Alex Carder	35	2011
6	Zach Terrell	30	2015
7	Zach Terrell	29	2014
	Kaleb Eleby	29	2021
9	Tony Kimbrough	27	1988
10	Jarvion Franklin	24	2014

== Defense ==
=== Interceptions ===
Career
Rank	Player	Ints	Years
1	Dave Kribs	24	1937 1938 1939
2	Floyd Stollsteimer	15	1951 1952 1953
	Ron Karlis	15	1970 1971 1972
4	Ronald Rogers	14	1998 1999 2000 2001
5	Darius Phillips	12	2014 2015 2016 2017

Single season
Rank	Player	Ints	Year
1	Dave Kribs	11	1939
2	Dave Kribs	9	1938
	Bill Yambrick	9	1942
	Floyd Stollsteimer	9	1951

Single game
Rank	Player	Ints	Year	Opponent
1	Bill Yambrick	4	1942	Wayne State
	Sam Antonazzo	4	1968	Marshall
3	George Ihler	3	1962	Marshall
	Dick Trudeau	3	1966	West Texas State
	Dave Gapinski	3	1976	Ohio
	Tony Carr	3	2002	Eastern Michigan

=== Tackles ===
Career
Rank	Player	Tackles	Years
1	John Offerdahl	694	1982 1983 1984 1985
2	Sean Mulhearn	435	1987 1988 1989 1990
3	Eric Hoffman	406	1985 1986 1987 1988
4	Peter Tuffo	382	1990 1991 1992 1993 1994
5	Greg Igaz	346	1969 1970 1971
6	Justin Currie	339	2011 2012 2013 2014
7	John Schuster	334	1978 1979 1980 1981
8	Scott Niles	313	1996 1997 1998 1999
9	Robert Spillane	312	2014 2015 2016 2017
10	Dominic Riggio	310	1971 1972 1973
	Louis Delmas	310	2005 2006 2007 2008

Single season
Rank	Player	Tackles	Year
1	John Offerdahl	192	1983
2	Eric Manns	186	1978
3	John Offerdahl	182	1984

Single game
Rank	Player	Tackles	Year	Opponent
1	Willie Berrios	27	1987	Central Michigan
2	Greg Igaz	25	1970	Brigham Young
3	Van Dickerson	24	1977	Central Michigan
	John Offerdahl	24	1984	Ball State
5	Asantay Brown	22	2017	Toledo

=== Sacks ===
Career
Rank	Player	Sacks	Years
1	Jason Babin	38.0	2000 2001 2002 2003
2	Joel Smeenge	34.0	1986 1987 1988 1989

Single season
Rank	Player	Sacks	Year
1	Ameer Ismail	17.0	2006
2	Jason Babin	15.0	2002
	Jason Babin	15.0	2003
4	Nadame Tucker	14.5	2025
5	Joel Smeenge	14.0	1989
6	Roy Swoape	13.0	1985
	Ali Fayad	13.0	2021

Single game
Rank	Player	Sacks	Year	Opponent
1	Ameer Ismail	6.0	2006	Ball State

== Kicking ==
=== Field goals made ===
Career
Rank	Player	FGs	Years
1	Andrew Haldeman	57	2012 2013 2014 2015
2	Mike Prindle	54	1981 1982 1983 1984
3	Brad Selent	50	1997 1998 1999 2000
4	John Potter	47	2008 2009 2010 2011
5	Jay Barresi	45	1989 1990 1991 1992
6	John Creek	42	1985 1986 1987 1988

Single season
Rank	Player	FGs	Year
1	Mike Prindle	24	1984
2	Butch Hampton	19	2016
3	Brad Selent	18	1998
4	Mike Prindle	17	1982
	Nate Meyer	17	2006
	Andrew Haldeman	17	2015
7	John Potter	16	2011
	Andrew Haldeman	16	2013
9	John Creek	15	1988
	Jay Barresi	15	1989

Single game
Rank	Player	FGs	Year	Opponent
1	Mike Prindle	7	1984	Marshall
2	Andrew Haldeman	6	2013	Toledo
3	Butch Hampton	5	2016	Ohio (MAC Championship Game)
4	Mike Prindle	4	1984	Ohio
	Jay Barresi	4	1989	Toledo
	Brad Selent	4	1998	Ball State
	Nate Meyer	4	2005	Virginia
	Dieter Kelly	4	2026	Michigan
