= List of Western Michigan Broncos in the NFL draft =

This is a list of Western Michigan Broncos football players in the NFL draft.

== Key ==
B	Back	K	Kicker	NT	Nose tackle
C	Center	LB	Linebacker	FB	Fullback
DB	Defensive back	P	Punter	HB	Halfback
DE	Defensive end	QB	Quarterback	WR	Wide receiver
DT	Defensive tackle	RB	Running back	G	Guard
E	End	T	Offensive tackle	TE	Tight end

== Selections ==
Year	Round	Pick	Player	Team	Position
1943	26	247	Bill Yambrick	Pittsburgh Steelers	C
1943	27	252	Art Macioszczyk	Philadelphia Eagles	FB
1945	26	269	Ben Wall	Washington Redskins	B
1950	18	223	Charley Schoolmaster	Baltimore Colts	C
1960	17	199	Lovell Coleman	Cleveland Browns	B
1962	4	48	John Lomakoski	Detroit Lions	T
1962	20	280	Mike Snodgrass	Green Bay Packers	C
1963	6	77	Pat Emerick	San Francisco 49ers	G
1963	11	147	Allen Schau	Washington Redskins	E
1964	17	235	Larry Bartolameolli	Cleveland Browns	T
1967	2	43	Bob Rowe	St. Louis Cardinals	DE
1967	10	251	Torre Ossmo	San Diego Chargers	T
1968	3	83	Dale Livingston	Cincinnati Bengals	K
1970	11	267	Mike Siwek	St. Louis Cardinals	DT
1971	17	422	Greg Flaska	New York Jets	DE
1972	7	181	Bill Slater	Minnesota Vikings	DE
1972	11	274	Dennis Sweeney	Philadelphia Eagles	DE
1972	15	377	Roger Lawson	Chicago Bears	RB
1972	17	441	Vern Brown	Miami Dolphins	DB
1973	12	295	Bernard Thomas	Baltimore Colts	DE
1973	16	411	Keith Pretty	Green Bay Packers	TE
1974	15	390	Larry Gates	Miami Dolphins	DB
1977	11	283	Rocco Moore	Philadelphia Eagles	T
1982	12	320	Al Hughes	Pittsburgh Steelers	DE
1985	4	102	Tom Toth	New England Patriots	T
1986	2	52	John Offerdahl	Miami Dolphins	LB
1987	6	146	Mark Garalczyk	St. Louis Cardinals	DT
1989	5	133	Kevin Haverdink	New Orleans Saints	T
1990	3	71	Joel Smeenge	New Orleans Saints	DE
1991	11	281	Terry Crews	Los Angeles Rams	LB
1993	6	152	Paul Hutchins	Green Bay Packers	T
1994	6	166	Steve Hawkins	New England Patriots	DB
1995	7	221	Tom Nütten	Buffalo Bills	C
2004	1	27	Jason Babin	Houston Texans	DE
2006	2	52	Greg Jennings	Green Bay Packers	WR
2006	2	61	Tony Scheffler	Denver Broncos	TE
2009	2	33	Louis Delmas	Detroit Lions	DB
2009	7	217	E. J. Biggers	Tampa Bay Buccaneers	DB
2012	7	244	Jordan White	New York Jets	WR
2012	7	251	John Porter	Buffalo Bills	K
2016	4	121	Willie Beavers	Minnesota Vikings	T
2016	7	230	Daniel Braverman	Chicago Bears	WR
2017	1	5	Corey Davis	Tennessee Titans	WR
2017	2	64	Taylor Moton	Carolina Panthers	T
2017	7	248	Keion Adams	Pittsburgh Steelers	DE
2018s	3	0	Sam Beal	New York Giants	DB
2018	3	92	Chukwuma Okorafor	Pittsburgh Steelers	T
2018	5	170	Darius Phillips	Cincinnati Bengals	DB
2021	2	56	D'Wayne Eskridge	Seattle Seahawks	WR
2021	5	155	Jaylon Moore	San Francisco 49ers	G
2022	2	54	Skyy Moore	Kansas City Chiefs	WR
2023	6	184	Zaire Barnes	New York Jets	LB
2024	2	56	Marshawn Kneeland	Dallas Cowboys	DE
2025	6	178	Bilhal Kone	Baltimore Ravens	CB
