= List of Western Michigan University alumni =

The following is a list of Western Michigan University alumni. Note that some of the individuals listed may have only attended the university at one point and not graduated.

== Arts and literature ==
- Bonnie Jo Campbell, author
- Xavier Davis, pianist
- Gwen Frostic, artist, naturalist, poet laureate of Michigan, namesake of WMU's Frostic School of Art, 1929 Bachelor of Arts
- James D. Griffioen, writer and photographer
- Kyoko Matsuoka, author and translator
- Richelle Mead, author
- Hideaki Miyamura, potter
- Howard Norman, novelist
- Arleta Richardson, author
- Carey Salerno, poet
- Diane Seuss, poet
- Terry Wooten, poet

== Business ==
- Robert Bobb, emergency financial manager for the Detroit Public Schools
- Jeanne Dietsch, co-founder of MobileRobots Inc
- Tom Englert, second CEO of Discount Tire
- Alec Gores, billionaire president of the Gores Group with an estimated net worth of $1.3 billion
- Gerrard Wendell Haworth, businessman, founder of Haworth, Inc.
- Richard Haworth, businessman, chairman of Haworth, Inc., WMU trustee
- Timothy E. Hoeksema (1972), founder of Midwest Airlines
- Homer Hartman Stryker, founder of Stryker Corporation, 1916 Certificate of Teaching

== Education ==
- Terry Bergeson, State of Washington superintendent of Public Schools
- Robert H. Bruininks, president of University of Minnesota
- Dr. James Bultman, president of Hope College
- John A. Fallon, president, Eastern Michigan University; president, SUNY Potsdam; president, William Penn University
- Frank Douglas Garrett, All-America basketball, academic dean, Oakland University
- M. Peter McPherson, president of the National Association of State Universities and Land-Grant Colleges, member of the Dow Jones board of directors, president-emeritus of Michigan State University
- John J. Pruis, president of Ball State University
- Merze Tate, first African American-graduate of WMU; first African-American woman to attend Oxford; Harvard PhD

== Entertainment ==
- Tim Allen, actor and comedian
- Bruce Campbell, actor
- Terry Crews, actor
- Brooke Elliott, star of Lifetime Television Network show Drop Dead Diva
- Nicole Forester, actress
- Caleb Hammer, YouTuber (dropped out)
- Mary Jackson, actress
- Page Kennedy, actor
- Loretta Mae Moore Long, Susan Robinson on Sesame Street, 1960 Bachelor of Arts
- Stephen Lynch, Tony Award-nominated actor, musician, stand-up comedian
- Marin Mazzie, Tony Award-nominated actress
- Jeff Osterhage, film and television actor
- Paigion, born Kimberly Walker, actress, radio and television personality
- John Saunders, ABC Sports television personality
- Beby Tsabina, Indonesian actress, model, and singer
- David Wayne, film, television and Tony Award-winning stage actor
- Lauren Zakrin, Broadway actress

== Journalism ==
- Roz Abrams, New York City TV news presenter, CNN reporter
- Ed Gordon, television talk show host on BET and MSNBC, correspondent for NBC News and CBS News, and radio host on NPR
- LZ Granderson, columnist for ESPN and CNN

== Law ==
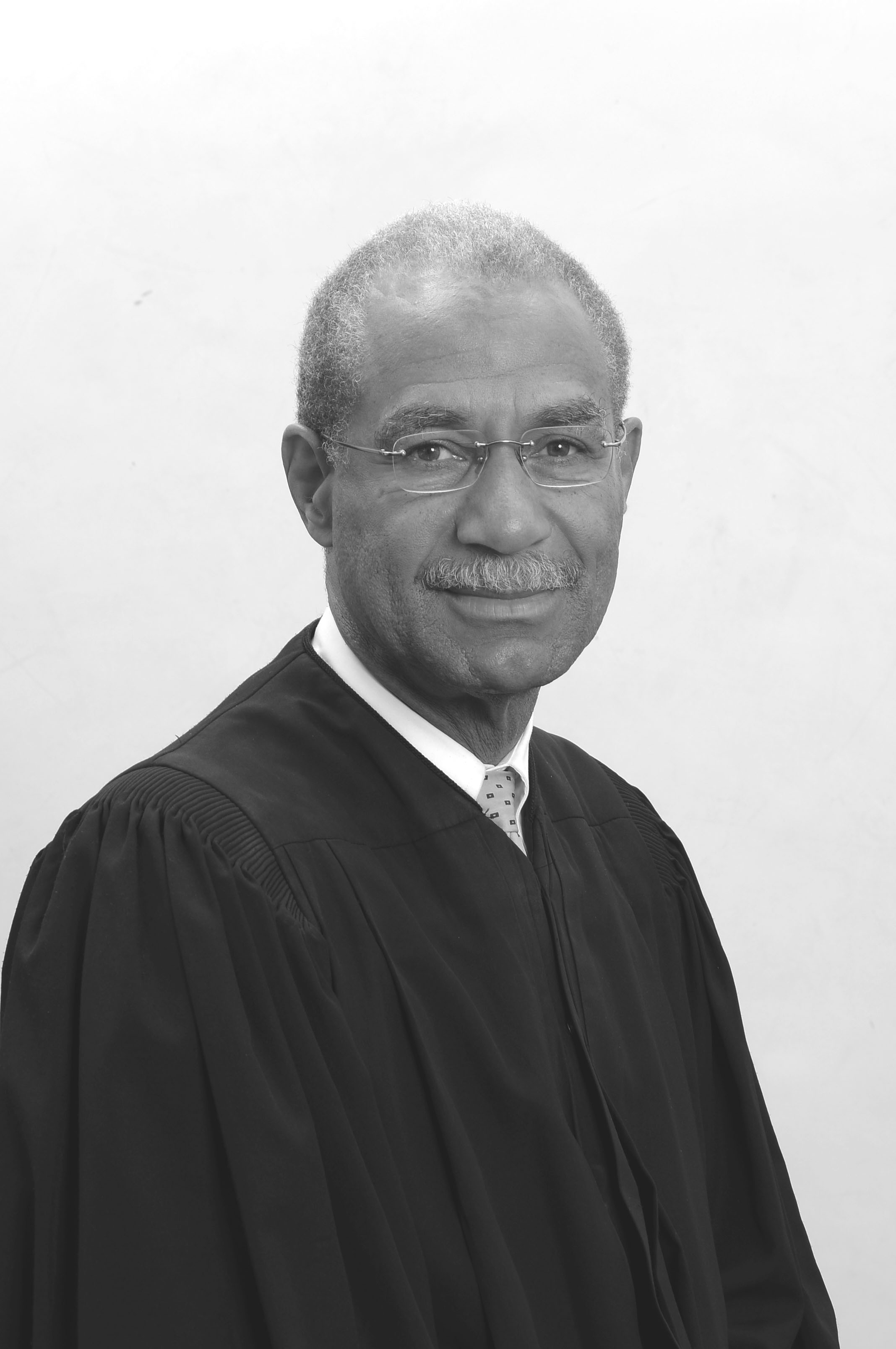
Judge Gershwin A. Drain

- Dennis W. Archer, mayor of Detroit, Michigan Supreme Court justice, president of the American Bar Association, WMU trustee, 1965 Bachelor of Science
- John J. Bursch, former Michigan solicitor general
- Michael Cohen, former lawyer of Donald Trump
- Gershwin A. Drain, judge of the United States District Court for the Eastern District of Michigan
- Karla Gray, chief justice of the Montana Supreme Court
- Richard Allen Griffin, judge of the United States Court of Appeals for the Sixth Circuit
- Wallace Kent, judge of the United States Court of Appeals for the Sixth Circuit

== Music ==
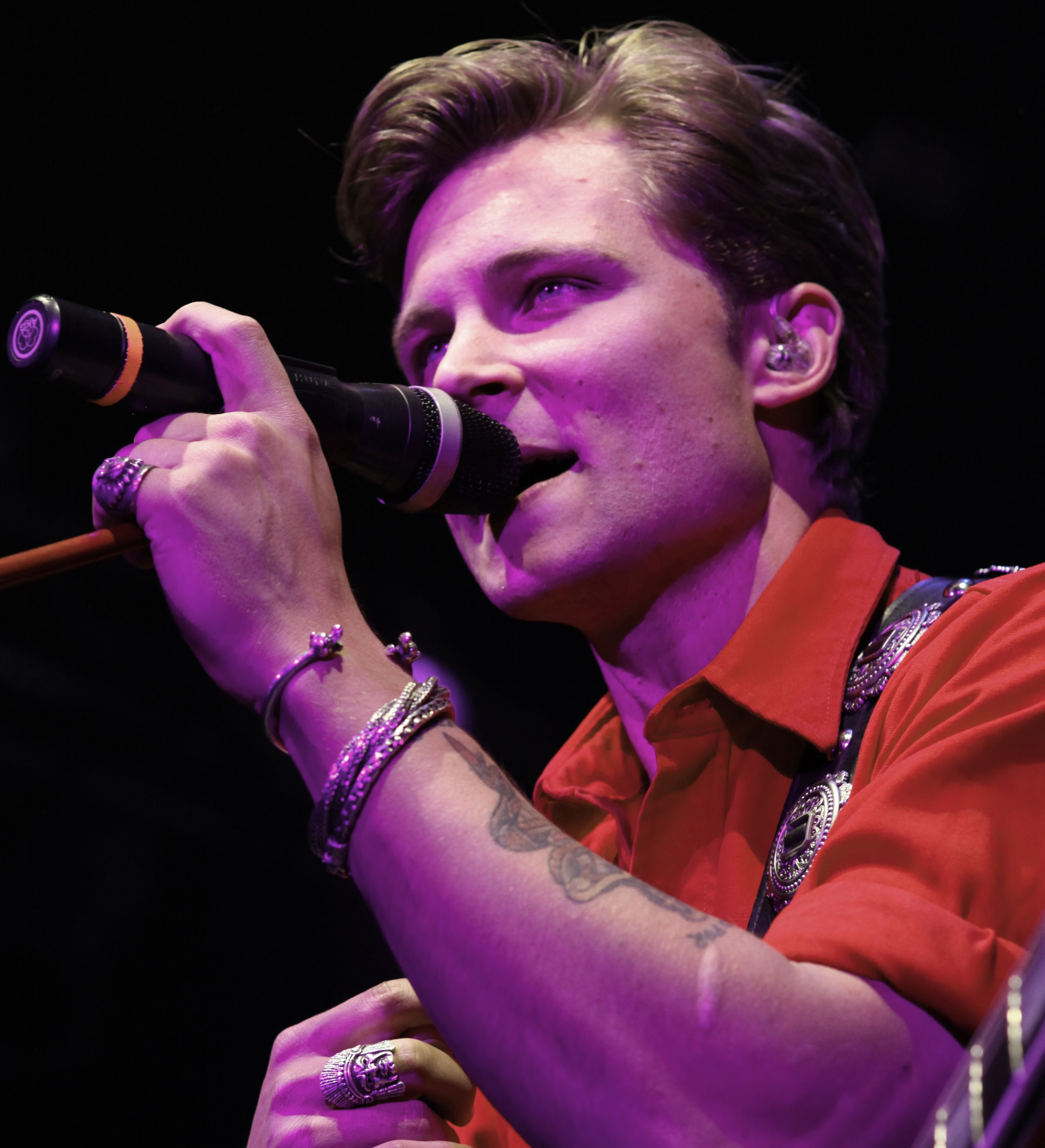
Frankie Ballard

- Frankie Ballard, country music artist
- Scott Boerma, director of bands at WMU and former director of the Michigan Marching Band
- Matt Giraud, American Idol top 5 finalist
- Josh Gracin, country music artist and American Idol finalist
- Michael Gungor, lead singer of the musical collective Gungor
- Sango, DJ and electronic musician
- Wayne Static, lead singer and guitarist of industrial metal band Static-X
- Luther Vandross, rhythm and blues/urban contemporary singer, songwriter, and record producer

== Politics, diplomacy and military ==
- Gardner Ackley, chairman of the Council of Economic Advisers under Lyndon Johnson, Economics Department chair at the University of Michigan
- Jase Bolger, state representative, speaker of the Michigan House of Representatives
- Scott Boman, Michigan politician
- Jeanne Dietsch, New Hampshire state senator
- Gerald Jernigan, mayor of Ann Arbor, Michigan
- Robert B. Jones, mayor of Kalamazoo and Michigan state representative
- Carolyn Cheeks Kilpatrick, U.S. representative
- Charles S. May, 16th lieutenant governor of Michigan
- Jack B. Olson, lieutenant governor of Wisconsin
- Kristy Pagan, Democratic politician from Michigan who represents the 21st District in the Michigan House of Representatives
- Kitty Piercy, mayor of Eugene, Oregon
- Mark Schauer, U.S. representative, state senator, minority leader of the Michigan Senate
- Dylan Schmorrow, commander, U.S. Navy and aerospace experimental psychologist
- Mark D. Siljander, U.S. representative
- Rashida Tlaib, U.S. representative and former Michigan state representative;

== Athletics ==
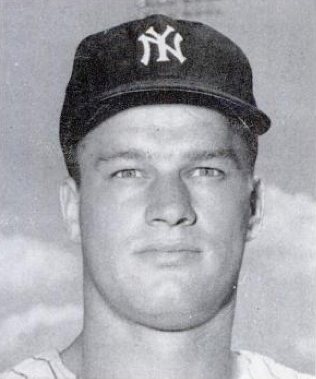
Jim Bouton

- Keegan Akin, MLB pitcher for the Baltimore Orioles
- Richard Ash, NFL player for Dallas Cowboys
- Mohammed Asif, professional sailor and space propulsion researcher
- Jason Babin, NFL player for Arizona Cardinals
- Freddie Bishop III, CFL player for Calgary Stampeders
- Jim Bouton, MLB baseball player, World Series pitcher for New York Yankees, actor, author of Ball Four
- Don Boven, NBA player
- Daniel Braverman (born 1993), NFL football player
- Judi Brown, Olympic silver medalist
- Matt Cappotelli, professional wrestler
- Orlando Colon, aka Epico, WWE wrestler, played baseball for Western Michigan
- Scott Colton, aka Colt Cabana, professional wrestler and podcaster
- Kevin Connauton, NHL player for Dallas Stars
- Terry Crews, NFL all-conference MAC player and actor
- Corey Davis, NFL wide receiver for the New York Jets, highest drafted NFL player in WMU history (5th overall)
- Danny DeKeyser, defenseman for Detroit Red Wings
- Louis Delmas, All-American free safety NFL player
- Bill Doba, head football coach at Washington State University (2003–2007)
- Dave Dombrowski, President of Baseball Operations of Boston Red Sox, former GM of Detroit Tigers
- Shawn Faulkner, football player
- Brad Fischer, bullpen coach for Oakland Athletics
- Paul Griffin, NBA player
- Ben Handlogten, NBA player
- John Harbaugh, former NFL head coach for Baltimore Ravens (Master's degree from WMU)
- Glenn Healy, NHL goalie
- Greg Jennings, former NFL wide receiver
- Keith Jones, hockey analyst on NBC Sports and NHL player
- Ernie Koob, MLB pitcher, threw no-hitter for 1917 St. Louis Browns
- John Kusku, Team USA goalball player, Paralympic silver medalist
- Bill Lajoie, general manager of Detroit Tigers, 1984–90; special advisor for three other teams
- Rich Maloney, head coach for University of Michigan baseball team
- Charlie Maxwell, Major League Baseball player
- Jamal Mayers, NHL player for Chicago Blackhawks
- Jeff Mayweather, trainer and former professional boxer
- Jay McDonagh, football player
- Ira James Murchison, Olympic gold medalist, NCAA national champion
- Lenda Murray, bodybuilder, 8-time Ms. Olympia
- Tom Nütten, retired NFL player for St. Louis Rams
- John Offerdahl, 5-time Pro Bowl NFL player
- Walter Owens, Negro league baseball pitcher, basketball and track and field player for Michigan, baseball and basketball coach at Detroit's Northwestern High School
- William Perigo, Western Michigan basketball player and head coach
- William Porter, Olympic gold medalist
- John Potter, professional football kicker
- Mike Prindle, NFL placekicker
- Frank Quilici, infielder (1965, 1967–70) and manager (1972–75) for the Minnesota Twins
- Joe Reitz, NFL offensive lineman, WMU basketball player
- Mark Ricks, football player
- Sean Riley (born 1974), football player
- Adam Rosales, MLB third baseman for Oakland Athletics
- Walker Russell, NBA player
- Tony Scheffler, NFL tight end for Detroit Lions
- Neil Smith, owner of Greenville Road Warriors of ECHL, general manager of NHL's New York Rangers and New York Islanders
- Paul Szczechura, NHL player for Tampa Bay Lightning
- Wayne Terwilliger, Chicago Cubs second baseman, MLB coach, author
- Roger Theder, head football coach, University of California, Berkeley (1978–1981)
- Ray Thomas, MLB player
- Elliot Uzelac, head football coach, Western Michigan University (1975–1981) and U.S. Naval Academy (1987–1989)
- John Vander Wal, professional baseball player
- Jordan White, professional football player
- Skyler Young, basketball coach

== Fictional ==
- Tim Taylor, Home Improvement
- Jill Taylor, Home Improvement
- Dave Johnson, The Neighborhood
