= 2019 First Responder Bowl =

Postseason college football bowl game

2019 Servpro First Responder Bowl
- 10th First Responder Bowl
Western Kentucky Hilltoppers	Western Michigan Broncos
(8–4)	(7–5)
C-USA	MAC
23	20
Head coach: Tyson Helton	Head coach: Tim Lester
	1	2	3	4	Total
Western Kentucky	0	10	0	13	23
Western Michigan	3	7	7	3	20
- Date: December 30, 2019
- Season: 2019
- Stadium: Gerald J. Ford Stadium
- Location: University Park, Texas
- MVP: Lucky Jackson (WR, Western Kentucky)
- Favorite: Western Kentucky by 3
- Referee: Jeremy Parker (Sun Belt)
- Attendance: 13,164
- Payout: US$824,545

United States TV coverage
- Network: ESPN
- Announcers: Dave Neal (play-by-play), DJ Shockley (analyst) and Dawn Davenport (sideline)

The 2019 First Responder Bowl was a college football bowl game played December 30, 2019, with kickoff at 12:30 p.m. EST (11:30 a.m. local CDT) on ESPN. It was the 10th edition of the First Responder Bowl (although only the ninth to be played, as the 2018 edition of the game was declared a no contest while the game was in the first quarter), and was one of the 2019–20 bowl games concluding the 2019 FBS football season. Sponsored by fire and water cleanup and restoration company Servpro, the game was officially known as the Servpro First Responder Bowl.

The 2019 First Responder Bowl was played in Gerald J. Ford Stadium on the campus of Southern Methodist University in University Park, Texas. The move was necessitated by the National Hockey League's announcement that the league's annual New Year's Day outdoor game would be played in the bowl's normal host stadium, Dallas' Cotton Bowl, which created a scheduling conflict. Ford Stadium previously hosted two editions of the Armed Forces Bowl due to construction at its host stadium, Amon G. Carter Stadium in Fort Worth, Texas.

== Teams ==
The game featured the Western Kentucky Hilltoppers of Conference USA (C-USA) and the Western Michigan Broncos of the Mid-American Conference (MAC). This was the 16th meeting between the two programs, and the first since 1947; Western Michigan led the all-time series, 11–3–1.

=== Western Kentucky Hilltoppers ===
Western Kentucky entered the game with an 8–4 record (6–2 in conference). The Hilltoppers finished tied for second place with Marshall in the East Division of C-USA.

=== Western Michigan Broncos ===
Western Michigan entered the game with a 7–5 record (5–3 in conference). The Broncos finished in second place of the West Division of the MAC. Each of their five losses during the regular season were away games.

== Game summary ==
2019 Servpro First Responder Bowl

Quarter	1	2	3	4	Total
Western Kentucky	0	10	0	13	23
Western Michigan	3	7	7	3	20

at Gerald J. Ford Stadium • University Park, Texas

- Date: Monday, December 30, 2019
- Game time: 12:30 p.m. EST (11:30 a.m. CST)
- Game weather: Sunny • Temperature: 50 °F (10 °C) • Wind: WNW 12 mph
- Game attendance: 13,164
- Referee: Jeremy Parker
- TV announcers (ESPN): Dave Neal (play-by-play), DJ Shockley (analyst) and Dawn Davenport (sideline)
- ESPN game summary

Game information

First Quarter

- (4:17) WMU – Thiago Kapps 30 yard field goal (Drive: 13 plays, 57 yards, 6:11; Western Michigan 3–0)

Second Quarter

- (10:54) WKU – Ty Storey 17 yard pass to Jahcour Pearson, Cory Munson kick (Drive: 11 plays, 93 yards, 5:28; Western Kentucky 7–3)
- (2:22) WKU – Cory Munson 26 yard field goal (Drive: 12 plays, 68 yards, 5:25; Western Kentucky 10–3)
- (0:59) WMU – Kareem Ali 88 yard interception return, Thiago Kapps kick (Tied 10–10)

Third Quarter

- (8:18) WMU – Jon Wassink 6 yard pass to DaShon Bussell, Thiago Kapps kick (Drive: 10 plays, 90 yards, 4:30; Western Michigan 17–10)

Fourth Quarter

- (10:40) WKU – Ty Storey 5 yard pass to Lucky Jackson, Cory Munson kick (Drive: 12 plays, 80 yards, 6:32; Tied 17–17)
- (4:58) WMU – Thiago Kapps 20 yard field goal (Drive: 12 plays, 62 yards, 5:42; Western Michigan 20–17)
- (1:36) WKU – Cory Munson 31 yard field goal (Drive: 9 plays, 55 yards, 3:22; Tied 20–20)
- (0:00) WKU – Cory Munson 52 yard field goal (Drive: 5 plays, 36 yards, 0:27; Western Kentucky 23–20)

=== Statistics ===
Statistics	WKU	WMU
First downs	28	19
Plays–yards	80–481	67–307
Rushes–yards	28–123	31–114
Passing yards	358	193
Passing: comp–att–int	35–52–2	19–36–1
Time of possession	32:01	27:59

Team	Category	Player	Statistics
Western Kentucky	Passing	Ty Storey	35/51, 358 yards, 2 TD, 2 INT
Western Kentucky	Rushing	Gaej Walker	15 carries, 93 yards
Western Kentucky	Receiving	Lucky Jackson	17 receptions, 148 yards, 1 TD
Western Michigan	Passing	Jon Wassink	19/36, 193 yards, 1 TD, 1 INT
Western Michigan	Rushing	LeVante Bellamy	18 carries, 60 yards
Western Michigan	Receiving	Skyy Moore	4 receptions, 68 yards
