= 2018 Famous Idaho Potato Bowl =

College football bowl game

- 22nd Famous Idaho Potato Bowl
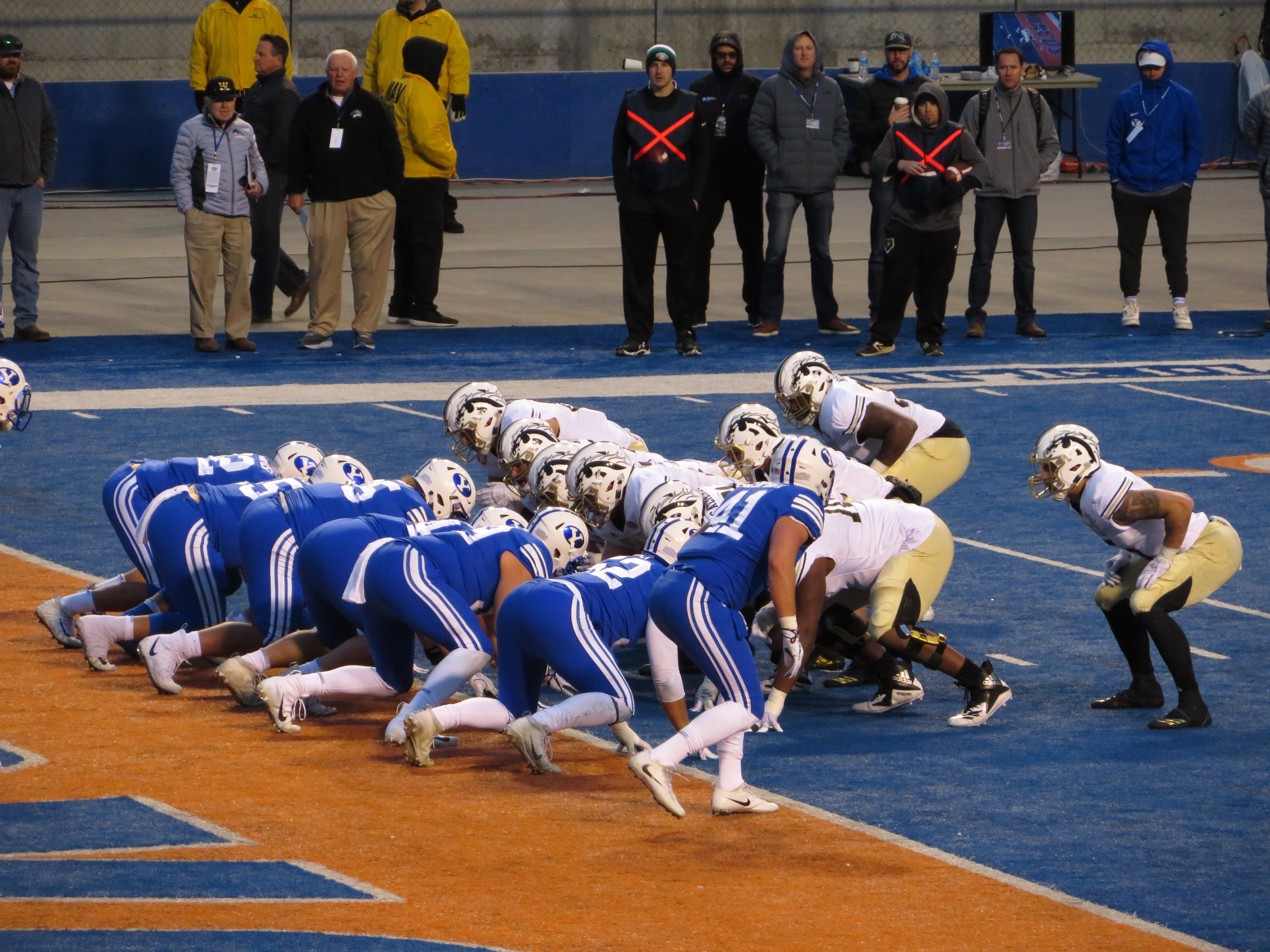
- Western Michigan and BYU line up at BYU's goal line during the 2018 Famous Idaho Potato Bowl
Western Michigan Broncos	BYU Cougars
(7–5)	(6–6)
MAC	Independent
18	49
Head coach: Tim Lester	Head coach: Kalani Sitake
	1	2	3	4	Total
Western Michigan	0	10	0	8	18
BYU	7	0	28	14	49
- Date: December 21, 2018
- Season: 2018
- Stadium: Albertsons Stadium
- Location: Boise, Idaho
- MVP: Zach Wilson (QB, BYU)
- Favorite: BYU by 12
- Referee: Jeremy Parker (Sun Belt)
- Attendance: 18,711
- Payout: US$950,000

United States TV coverage
- Network: ESPN and Gameday Radio
- Announcers: Roy Philpott, Tom Ramsey and Alex Corddry (ESPN); Scott Garrard, Hans Olsen and Chris Lewis (Gameday Radio)

The 2018 Famous Idaho Potato Bowl was a college football bowl game played on December 21, 2018. It was the 22nd edition of the Famous Idaho Potato Bowl, and one of the 2018–19 bowl games concluding the 2018 FBS football season. The game was sponsored by the Idaho Potato Commission.

== Teams ==
The game matched the Western Michigan Broncos, from the Mid-American Conference, and the BYU Cougars, an independent team. The programs previously had met five times, most recently in 1970, with BYU holding a 3–2 edge.

=== Western Michigan Broncos ===
Western Michigan received and accepted a bid to the Famous Idaho Potato Bowl on December 2. The Broncos entered the bowl with a 7–5 record (5–3 in conference). This was Western Michigan's second appearance in the Famous Idaho Potato Bowl, having lost to Air Force in the 2014 edition.

=== BYU Cougars ===
BYU received and accepted a bid to the Famous Idaho Potato Bowl on December 2. The independent Cougars entered the bowl with a 6–6 record. BYU became the first independent team to play in the Famous Idaho Potato Bowl.

=== Potato Bowl MVP ===
Zach Wilson won Potato bowl MVP after a stellar performance completing all 18 of his passes for 317 yards and 4 touchdowns.

== Game summary ==
=== Scoring summary ===
Scoring summary

Quarter	Time	Drive			Team	Scoring information	Score	
Quarter	Time	Plays	Yards	TOP	Team	Scoring information	WMU	BYU
1	2:20	2	27	0:41	BYU	Dylan Collie 26-yard touchdown reception from Zach Wilson, Skyler Southam kick good	0	7
2	3:07	4	40	1:53	WMU	Jamauri Bogan 33-yard touchdown run, Gavin Peddie kick good	7	7
2	0:24	11	51	1:14	WMU	37-yard field goal by Gavin Peddie	10	7
3	13:14	3	69	1:46	BYU	Dylan Collie 8-yard touchdown reception from Zach Wilson, Skyler Southam kick good	10	14
3	7:29	4	74	1:27	BYU	Riley Burt 37-yard touchdown run, Skyler Southam kick good	10	21
3	5:04	2	63	0:45	BYU	Aleva Hifo 70-yard touchdown reception from Zach Wilson, Skyler Southam kick good	10	28
3	2:47	3	32	1:19	BYU	Dayan Ghanwoloku 1-yard touchdown run, Skyler Southam kick good	10	35
4	11:38	4	54	1:47	BYU	Dax Milne 5-yard touchdown reception from Zach Wilson, Skyler Southam kick good	10	42
4	7:37	9	75	4:01	WMU	Kaleb Eleby 1-yard touchdown run, 2-point pass good (Kaleb Eleby to Jayden Reed)	18	42
4	4:07	7	75	3:30	BYU	Brayden El-Bakri 1-yard touchdown run, Skyler Southam kick good	18	49
"TOP" = time of possession. For other American football terms, see Glossary of American football.							18	49

=== Statistics ===
	1	2	3	4	Total
Broncos	0	10	0	8	18
Cougars	7	0	28	14	49

Statistics	WMU	BYU
First downs	16	22
Plays–yards	76–313	52–490
Rushes–yards	39–138	33–132
Passing yards	175	358
Passing: Comp–Att–Int	20–37–1	19–19–0
Time of possession	35:21	24:39

Team	Category	Player	Statistics
Western Michigan	Passing	Kaleb Eleby	20/36, 175 yds, 1 INT
Western Michigan	Rushing	Jamauri Bogan	13 car, 62 yds, 1 TD
Western Michigan	Receiving	D'Wayne Eskridge	2 rec, 61 yds
BYU	Passing	Zach Wilson	18/18, 317 yds, 4 TD
BYU	Rushing	Riley Burt	13 car, 110 yds, 1 TD
BYU	Receiving	Dylan Collie	6 rec, 124 yds, 2 TD
