= Shawn Faulkner =

American gridiron football player (born 1962)

No. 28, 22, 25
- Position: Running back

Personal information
- Born: June 22, 1962 (age 64); Port Huron, Michigan, U.S.
- Listed height: 6 ft 0 in (1.83 m)
- Listed weight: 195 lb (88 kg)

Career information
- High school: Port Huron (MI) Central
- College: Western Michigan

Career history
- 1984: Michigan Panthers
- 1985: Oakland Invaders
- 1986: Montreal Alouettes
- 1987: Ottawa Rough Riders
- 1988–1989: Calgary Stampeders
- 1992: Tampa Bay Storm
- Stats at ArenaFan.com

Shawn Faulkner (born June 22, 1962) is an American former football running back who played four seasons in the Canadian Football League (CFL) with the Montreal Alouettes, Ottawa Rough Riders and Calgary Stampeders. He played college football at Western Michigan University. He was also a member of the Michigan Panthers, Oakland Invaders and Tampa Bay Storm.

== Early life ==
Faulkner played high school football at Port Huron Central High School in Port Huron, Michigan. He also participated in track, twice qualifying for the state finals in the low hurdles and high jump. He was also named the team's Most Outstanding Runner. Faulkner also wrestled for two years.

== College career ==
Faulkner played for the Western Michigan Broncos from 1980 to 1983. He was NCAA Division I-A's second leading rusher with 1,668 yards his senior season in 1983. He twice earned All-Mid-American Conference honors. Faulkner recorded career totals of 3,341 yards and 15 touchdowns on 761 rushing attempts.

== Professional career ==
Faulkner played for the Michigan Panthers of the United States Football League (USFL) in 1984. He played in eighteen games for the USFL's Oakland Invaders during the 1985 season. He played in six games for the Montreal Alouettes of the CFL in 1986. Faulkner played in five games for the Ottawa Rough Riders of the CFL during the 1987 season. He played in eighteen games for the CFL's Calgary Stampeders from 1988 to 1989. He played for the Tampa Bay Storm of the Arena Football League in 1992.
