= Art Macioszczyk =

American football player (1920–1982)

No. 31, 18
- Position: Fullback

Personal information
- Born: October 19, 1920; Hamtramck, Michigan, U.S.
- Died: May 6, 1982 (aged 61); Detroit, Michigan, U.S.
- Listed height: 6 ft 0 in (1.83 m)
- Listed weight: 208 lb (94 kg)

Career information
- High school: Hamtramck
- College: Western Michigan
- NFL draft: 1943: 27th round, 252 (By the Steagles)th overall pick

Career history
- Philadelphia Eagles (1944, 1947); Washington Redskins (1948)

Career NFL statistics
- Games played: 22
- Rushing yards: 159
- Stats at Pro Football Reference

Arthur A. Macioszczyk (October 19, 1920 – May 16, 1982) was an American professional football fullback in the National Football League (NFL) for the Philadelphia Eagles and Washington Redskins. He played college football at Western Michigan University and was drafted in the 27th round of the 1943 NFL draft by the Steagles. He served in World War II for the United States Army.
