= Tony Kimbrough =

American gridiron football player and coach (born 1964)

No. 1, 11
- Position: Quarterback

Personal information
- Born: January 20, 1964 (age 62); Detroit, Michigan, U.S.

Career information
- College: Western Michigan

Career history

Playing
- Ottawa Rough Riders (1989–1990); BC Lions (1991–1992); Charlotte Rage (1993–1994); San Jose SaberCats (1995–1996); Buffalo Destroyers (1999)

Coaching
- Utah Blaze (2008) Offensive coordinator

Awards and highlights
- MAC Most Valuable Player (1988); MAC Offensive Player of the Year (1988); First team All-MAC (1988)
- Stats at ArenaFan.com

Anthony Kimbrough (born January 20, 1964) is an American former football player and coach. He played professionally as a quarterback in the Canadian Football League (CFL) and the Arena Football League (CFL). Kimbrough played college football at Grand Rapids Community College before transferring Western Michigan University, earning Mid-American Conference (MAC) player of the year honors in 1988.

In May 2014, Kimbrough was named the head football coach at East Kentwood High School in Kentwood, Michigan, where he had been an assistant coach for two years.
