= Kendrick Mosley =

American football player (born 1981)

No. 18
- Position: Wide receiver

Personal information
- Born: July 21, 1981 (age 45); Pahokee, Florida, U.S.
- Listed height: 6 ft 2 in (1.88 m)
- Listed weight: 197 lb (89 kg)

Career information
- High school: Pahokee
- College: Western Michigan (1999–2003)
- NFL draft: 2004: undrafted

Career history
- Atlanta Falcons (2004)*; Cleveland Browns (2005–2006); Cleveland Gladiators (2008)
- * Offseason or practice squad member only
- Stats at Pro Football Reference

Kendrick Mosley (born July 21, 1981) is an American former professional football wide receiver who played for the Cleveland Browns of the National Football League (NFL).

== Playing career ==
Mosley started 16 of 46 games for Western Michigan University, catching 163 passes for 2,042 yards (12.5 avg.) and 12 touchdowns, adding 869 yards (795 m) and 2 touchdowns on 67 punt returns (13.0 avg.).

Mosely was signed by the Atlanta Falcons as an undrafted free agent rookie in 2004. He played in a single NFL game in 2006 for the Cleveland Browns.

He ended his career on the injured reserve list of the Cleveland Gladiators in the Arena Football League.
