= Bob Rowe (American football) =

American football player (born 1945)

No. 75
- Positions: Defensive tackle, Defensive end

Personal information
- Born: May 23, 1945 (age 81); Flint, Michigan, U.S.
- Listed height: 6 ft 4 in (1.93 m)
- Listed weight: 270 lb (122 kg)

Career information
- High school: Flushing (Flushing, Michigan)
- College: Western Michigan (1963-1966)
- NFL draft: 1967: 2nd round, 43rd overall pick

Career history
- St. Louis Cardinals (1967–1975)

Awards and highlights
- 2× MAC Defensive Player of the Year (1965, 1966)

Career NFL statistics
- Interceptions: 2
- Fumble recoveries: 9
- Sacks: 54.5
- Stats at Pro Football Reference

Robert Buell Rowe (born May 23, 1945) is an American former professional football player who was a defensive lineman in the National Football League (NFL).

== College career ==
Rowe played college ball at Western Michigan University and lettered three seasons (1964-1966) playing defensive tackle for the Broncos. He collected 211 tackles and was selected as the Mid-American Conference Lineman of the Year in his junior and senior seasons at Western Michigan. In 1966, Rowe was named second-team All-America by the Associated Press and played in the East-West Shrine Bowl and College All-Star Game.

== Professional career ==
Rowe was a second round selection (43rd overall pick) in the 1967 NFL/AFL draft by the St. Louis Cardinals. He played 9 seasons (1967–1975) in the NFL, all for the Cardinals, and his 54.5 sacks rank fifth in franchise history. He also intercepted two passes in 1969, returning one for a touchdown against the Minnesota Vikings.

One of Rowe's career highlights was blocking three Jim O'Brien field goals in the Cardinals' 10-3 win over the Baltimore Colts in the 1972 NFL season opener. Rowe led the league in blocked kicks that season and finished his career with 9.5 blocks. In 2019, Rowe was ranked as the 26th greatest kick blocker in NFL history.

== After football ==
Rowe was inducted into the St. Louis Sports Hall of Fame in 2019.
