= LeVante Bellamy =

American gridiron football player (born 1996)

Profile
- Position: Running back

Personal information
- Born: November 28, 1996 (age 29); Chicago, Illinois, U.S.
- Listed height: 5 ft 9 in (1.75 m)
- Listed weight: 192 lb (87 kg)

Career information
- High school: Indianapolis (IN) Pike
- College: Western Michigan (2015–2019)
- NFL draft: 2020: undrafted

Career history
- Denver Broncos (2020–2021); Calgary Stampeders (2023); Ottawa Redblacks (2024)*
- * Offseason or practice squad member only

Awards and highlights
- MAC Offensive Player of the Year (2019); 2× First-team All-MAC (2018, 2019)

Career NFL statistics
- Rushing yards: 11
- Rushing average: 2.8
- Receptions: 1
- Receiving yards: 5
- Stats at Pro Football Reference

LeVante Bellamy (born November 28, 1996) is an American professional football running back. He played college football at Western Michigan.

== College career ==
Bellamy was a member of the Western Michigan Broncos from 2015 to 2019. Bellamy rushed for 1,228 yards and six touchdowns on 205 carries and was named first-team All-Mid-American Conference (MAC) in his junior season. As a senior, he was named the MAC Offensive Player of the Year and first-team all-conference after rushing for 1,472 yards and 23 touchdowns. Bellamy finished his collegiate career with 617 carries for 3,720 yards and 35 touchdowns with 57 receptions for 370 yards and one touchdown.

== Professional career ==
Pre-draft measurables
Height	Weight	Arm length	Hand span	Wingspan	40-yard dash	10-yard split	20-yard split	Vertical jump	Broad jump	Bench press
5 ft 8 7/8 in (1.75 m)	192 lb (87 kg)	30 1/4 in (0.77 m)	8 3/4 in (0.22 m)	6 ft 1 7/8 in (1.88 m)	4.50 s	1.53 s	2.67 s	39.5 in (1.00 m)	10 ft 5 in (3.18 m)	16 reps
All values from NFL Combine

=== Denver Broncos ===
Bellamy was signed by the Denver Broncos as an undrafted free agent on April 25, 2020. He was waived during final roster cuts on September 5, but was signed to the team's practice squad the next day. He was elevated on September 19 for the team's week 2 game against the Pittsburgh Steelers, and reverted to the practice squad after the game. He was elevated again on September 26 for the team's week 3 game against the Tampa Bay Buccaneers, and reverted to the practice squad after the game. He was promoted to the active roster on September 30. He was placed on injured reserve on October 10. He was activated on November 24, and waived the next day. He was re-signed to the team's practice squad on November 27. On December 26, Bellamy was promoted back to the active roster.

On August 17, 2021, Bellamy was waived/injured by the Broncos and placed on injured reserve. He was released on December 7.

=== Calgary Stampeders ===
On January 13, 2023, Bellamy signed with the Calgary Stampeders of the Canadian Football League (CFL). On May 17, Bellamy was released by the Stampeders but re-signed with the team's practice squad on July 2, 2023. Bellamy played in seven games in 2023 where he had 23 carries for 70 yards, five receptions for 22 yards, and five kickoff returns for 95 yards. He attended training camp with the Stampeders in 2024, but was released on June 2, 2024.

=== Ottawa Redblacks ===
On July 10, 2024, it was announced that Bellamy had signed a practice roster agreement with the Ottawa Redblacks. He was placed on the reserve/suspended list on August 6.
