= Carey Salerno =

American poet and publisher

Carey Salerno is an American poet and publisher.

== Biography ==
She was born in Kalamazoo, Michigan, grew up near Lake Michigan, and earned her B.A. from Western Michigan University, and her MFA in creative writing from New England College.

Her most recent book, Tributary, (Persea Books, 2021) was reviewed by Poets & Writers, and Los Angeles Review of Books. In their review, Publishers Weekly praised Salerno for delivering “a bold, memorable, and capacious collection.” Salerno was also interviewed by Poets & Writers about her writing of the book. Her first book, Shelter, (Alice James Books, 2008), was the winner of a 2007 Kinereth Gensler Award. Library Journal, in reviewing Shelter, wrote that “This first collection takes courage to read, but you can bet it took more courage to write, and we should be glad Salerno did it.” She has had her poems published in literary journals and magazines including American Poetry Review, New England Review, Alaska Quarterly Review, Rattle (magazine), and From the Fishouse.

Salerno is also the executive director of Alice James Books. She has been featured or interviewed as executive director by HuffPost, Poets & Writers, The New York Times, and by the Community of Literary Magazines and Presses, when she accepted the 2021 Golden Colophon Award on behalf of Alice James Books. Lit from Inside: 40 Years of Poetry from Alice James Books, the poetry anthology which she and Anne Marie Macari co-edited, received a starred review from Publishers Weekly.

She lives in New Jersey.

== Published works ==
- Tributary (Persea Books, 2021)
- Shelter (Alice James Books, 2008)
