= Paul Hutchins (American football) =

American football player (born 1970)

No. 67
- Position: Offensive tackle

Personal information
- Born: February 11, 1970 (age 56); Chicago, Illinois, U.S.
- Listed height: 6 ft 5 in (1.96 m)
- Listed weight: 335 lb (152 kg)

Career information
- High school: Brother Rice
- College: Western Michigan
- NFL draft: 1993: 6th round, 152nd overall pick

Career history
- Green Bay Packers (1993–1995)

Career NFL statistics
- Games played: 17
- Games started: 2
- Stats at Pro Football Reference

Paul Andre Hutchins (born February 11, 1970) is an American former professional football player who was a tackle for the Green Bay Packers in the National Football League (NFL) from 1993 to 1995. He played college football for the Western Michigan Broncos. Hutchins was selected by the Packers in the sixth round (152nd pick) of the 1993 NFL draft. He played 17 career games with Green Bay.
