= Kaleb Eleby =

American football player (born 2000)

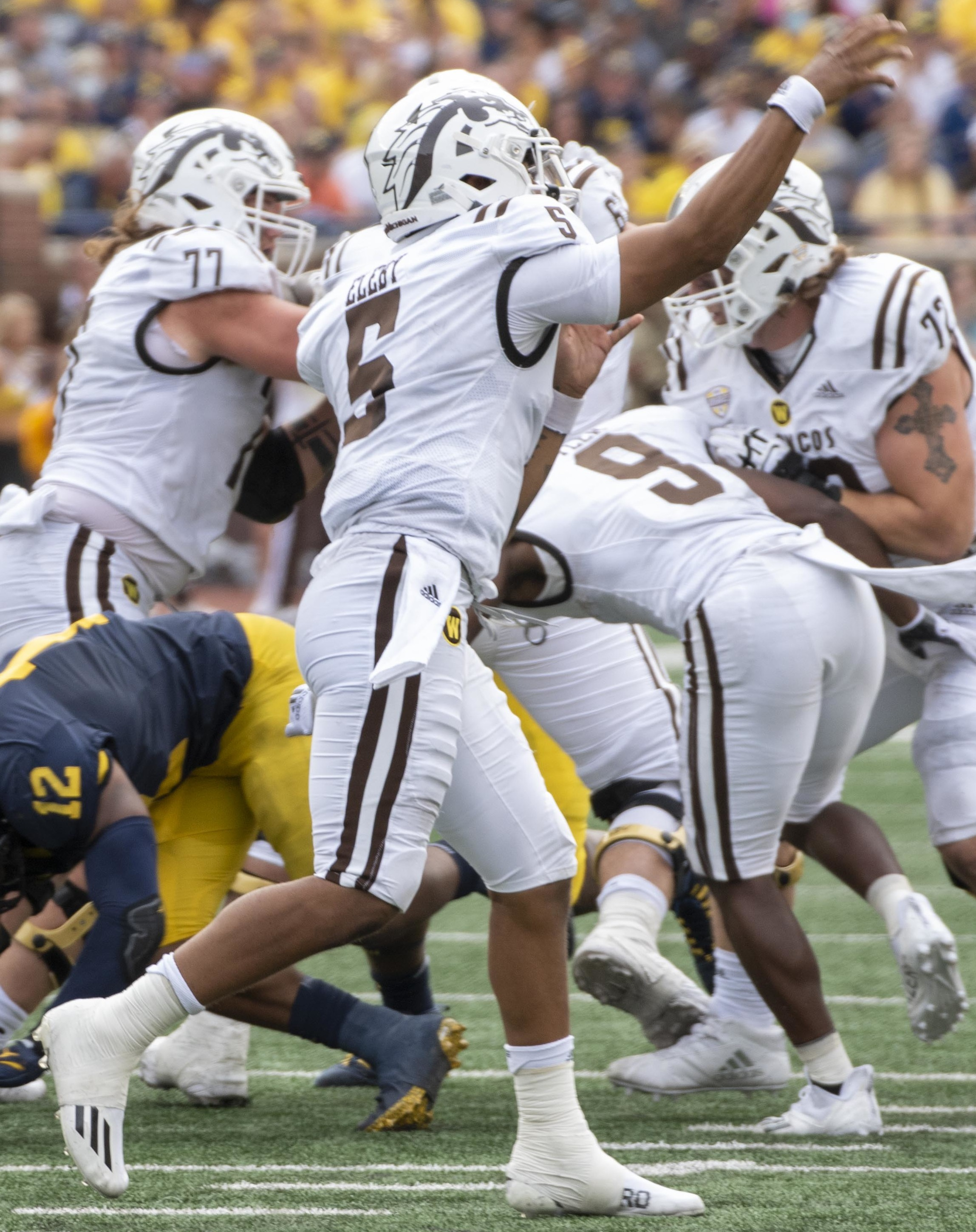
- Eleby with Western Michigan in 2019

No. 5
- Position: Quarterback

Personal information
- Born: March 13, 2000 (age 26); Maryland Heights, Missouri, U.S.
- Listed height: 6 ft 1 in (1.85 m)
- Listed weight: 210 lb (95 kg)

Career information
- High school: Pattonville (Maryland Heights, Missouri)
- College: Western Michigan (2018–2021)
- NFL draft: 2022: undrafted

Career history
- Houston Roughnecks (2023); Edmonton Elks (2024)*
- * Offseason or practice squad member only

Awards and highlights
- Second-team All-MAC (2021)

Kaleb Eleby (born March 13, 2000) is an American former professional football quarterback. He played college football at Western Michigan.

== Early life ==
Eleby attended Pattonville High School in Maryland Heights, Missouri. During his senior year, he earned Class 5 Missouri Player of the Year, first team all-state, first team all-district and first-team all conference. Over his high school career, he surpassed every passing record at Pattonville High School with a total of 9,735 yards and 95 touchdowns. He committed to the Western Michigan University to play college football.

== College career ==
Eleby entered his first year at Western Michigan in 2018 as a backup to Jon Wassink, before starting the final five games due to Wassink being injured. For the season he completed 92 of 147 passes for 1,092 yards, four touchdowns and three interceptions. After redshirting 2019, he took over as the full-time starter in 2020. He finished the season completing 98 of 152 passes for 1,699 yards, 18 touchdowns and two interceptions. In 2021, he had his best season, throwing for 3,277 and 23 touchdowns and being named to the All-MAC Second Team.

On January 4, 2022, Eleby declared for the 2022 NFL Draft.

== Professional career ==
Pre-draft measurables
Height	Weight	Arm length	Hand span	Wingspan	40-yard dash	10-yard split	20-yard split	20-yard shuttle	Three-cone drill	Vertical jump	Broad jump
6 ft 0 3/4 in (1.85 m)	208 lb (94 kg)	30 5/8 in (0.78 m)	9 1/4 in (0.23 m)	6 ft 3 3/4 in (1.92 m)	4.91 s	1.66 s	2.82 s	4.65 s	7.57 s	25.5 in (0.65 m)	9 ft 3 in (2.82 m)
All values from NFL Combine/Pro Day

After going undrafted he accepted an invitation to the Seattle Seahawks' rookie mini-camp.

=== Houston Roughnecks ===
Eleby was selected by the Houston Roughnecks in the 2023 XFL draft. He played in one game against the Arlington Renegades on April 23, 2023 where he went 4–for–7 with 28 yards and ran once for six yards. Eleby was released by the Roughnecks on December 15.

=== Edmonton Elks ===
On February 5, 2024, Eleby signed with the Edmonton Elks of the Canadian Football League (CFL). He was released by Edmonton on May 11.
