= Steve Hawkins (American football) =

American football player (born 1971)

No. 80
- Position: Wide receiver

Personal information
- Born: March 16, 1971 (age 55); Detroit, Michigan, U.S.
- Listed height: 6 ft 5 in (1.96 m)
- Listed weight: 210 lb (95 kg)

Career information
- High school: Central
- College: Western Michigan
- NFL draft: 1994: 6th round, 166th overall pick

Career history
- New England Patriots (1994); Carolina Panthers (1995)*
- * Offseason or practice squad member only

Awards and highlights
- First-team All-MAC (1993)
- Stats at Pro Football Reference

Steven Hawkins (born March 16, 1971) is an American former professional football wide receiver who played for the New England Patriots of the National Football League (NFL). He played college football for the Tennessee State Tigers and Western Michigan Broncos and was selected by the Patriots in the sixth round of the 1994 NFL draft.

== Early life ==
Steven Hawkins was born on March 16, 1971, in Detroit, Michigan. He played high school football at Detroit's Central High School as a quarterback.

== College career ==
Hawkins first enrolled at Tennessee State University to play college football for the Tigers. For the 1991 season, he transferred to Western Michigan University, where he played safety for the Broncos from 1991 to 1993. He earned first-team All-Mid-American Conference honors in 1993 and was chosen to play in the Blue–Gray Football Classic. Hawkins recorded four career interceptions during his time at Western Michigan.

== Professional career ==
Hawkins was selected by the New England Patriots in the sixth round, with the 166th overall pick, of the 1994 NFL draft and converted to wide receiver. He missed the first two preseason games due to injury. In his first-ever game at receiver on August 18 against the Washington Redskins, he caught two passes for two touchdowns in a 27–17 victory. Hawkins played in seven regular season games for the Patriots in 1994 as a reserve wide receiver, catching two passes for 22 yards on five targets. He was placed on injured reserve on December 16, 1994.

Hawkins was left unprotected in the 1995 NFL expansion draft. He was selected by the Carolina Panthers with the 36th pick of the draft. On August 4 against the Chicago Bears, Hawkins dropped a pass with a minute left in the game that would have put the Panthers in position for a game-tying field goal. Carolina lost 18–15. Hawkins was released on August 16, 1995, after the third of five preseason games.
