= Western Michigan Broncos football =

Sports program

2026 Western Michigan Broncos football team
- First season: 1906; 120 years ago
- Athletic director: Vacant
- Head coach: Lance Taylor; 3rd season, 22–20 (.524)
- Location: Kalamazoo, Michigan
- Stadium: Waldo Stadium (capacity: 30,200)
- NCAA division: Division I FBS
- Conference: MAC
- Colors: Brown and gold
- All-time record: 613–492–24 (.554)
- Bowl record: 3–10 (.231)

Conference championships
- MCC: 1929 MAC: 1966, 1988, 2016, 2025

Division championships
- MAC West: 1999, 2000, 2015, 2016
- Consensus All-Americans: 2
- Rivalries: Central Michigan (rivalry); Eastern Michigan (rivalry); Toledo
- Mascot: Buster Bronco
- Marching band: Bronco Marching Band
- Website: WMUBroncos.com

The Western Michigan Broncos football program represents Western Michigan University in the Football Bowl Subdivision of Division I and the Mid-American Conference (MAC). Western Michigan has competed in football since 1906, when they played three games in their inaugural season. In 1927, WMU joined four other schools (Central Michigan University, Eastern Michigan University, Ferris State University, and Wayne State University) to form the Michigan Collegiate Conference. Western Michigan then moved to its present conference in 1948. Prior to 1939, Western Michigan's athletic teams were known as the Hilltoppers.

WMU's main rival is the Central Michigan University Chippewas, and they play for the Victory Cannon. As of 2025, the Broncos have a 54–40–2 advantage in the series.

Western Michigan University has played in 13 bowl games in 3 different nations over the course of the programs history, including the inaugural International Bowl in 2007 in Toronto, Ontario, Canada. The Broncos' first bowl victory came when they defeated Middle Tennessee, 45–31, in the 2015 Bahamas Bowl. In 2017, the Broncos became the first MAC representative in the legendary Cotton Bowl Classic at AT&T Stadium in Arlington, TX after completing the 2016 regular season undefeated as MAC champions (13–0, 8–0).

== History ==
=== Early history (1906–1986) ===
From Western Michigan's first season of football in 1906 until it joined the MAC in 1948, WMU compiled a 187–87–12 (.675) record, going undefeated six times, in 1909, 1913, 1914, 1922, 1932, and 1941. During that stretch, Western Michigan had only seven losing seasons, and only once had back-to-back losing records. In 1922, the team finished 6–0 while outscoring their opponents, 160–0. The early dominance of the Hilltoppers was led by quarterback Walt Olsen and running back Scott Dunlap. In 1916, Olsen led the country in scoring with 17 touchdowns and 36 extra points. Olsen set a school-record with 8 touchdowns in a single game that season. Dunlap also set a team record with 19 touchdowns. The only loss in 1916 was to Notre Dame when George Gipp completed a 62-yard drop kick, the longest in football history. In 1939, WMU began playing at Waldo Stadium. Coinciding with the opening of the new stadium, the Hilltoppers changed their name to avoid confusion with athletic teams at Western Kentucky University and Marquette University. A contest was held to come up with a new name and assistant football coach John Gill suggested "Broncos." In support of the decision, the W Club's semi-annual publication, The Hilltopper, was renamed The Bronco. Western Michigan joined the MAC in 1948. At that time, the MAC consisted of Miami University, Ohio University, University of Cincinnati, Western Reserve University, and Butler University. The Broncos won their first conference game, 26–0, over Western Reserve and finished with a 6–3 record, good for second place. However, WMU would finish second or higher only 4 times in the next 39 years, compiling a 102–141–8 (.422) conference record in that stretch.

In 1961, Western Michigan finished second in the MAC with a 4–1–1 record, one-half game behind Bowling Green State University. Despite the second-place finish, WMU was invited to the Aviation Bowl in Dayton, OH. In freezing rain and snow, the Broncos lost to the University of New Mexico 28–12. The 1966 season resulted in a 7–3 record and WMU's first MAC football championship, which it shared with Miami. That season, tackle Bob Rowe won his second MAC Lineman of the Year Award. Rowe would go on to a 10-year National Football League career. Several players from the 1980s also played professionally including Duane Wilson (USFL), John Offerdahl and Tom Toth for the Miami Dolphins, and Mark Garylchk. Tom Nütten won a Super Bowl ring with the St. Louis Rams. Jack Harbaugh's first team went 7–2–2 and was second in the MAC. The defense that year was among the best in the nation.

=== Al Molde era (1987–1996) ===
In December 1986, Al Molde was hired to replace Jack Harbaugh. Molde had spent the previous four seasons as head coach at Eastern Illinois University where he led the Panthers to two playoff appearances (1983 and 1986) and a top 5 national ranking in 1986 (his 1986 squad was led by quarterback Sean Payton, former head coach of the NFL's New Orleans Saints).

==== 1987 season ====
The hiring paid immediate dividends, as Molde's first WMU squad finished the 1987 season 4–4 in the MAC (5–6 overall) and was much more competitive than recent WMU squads had been. Molde's first notable win came in the MAC opener, a 34–27 win at Bowling Green State University which was only two seasons removed from an 11–1 season.

==== 1988 season ====
In only his second year, Molde orchestrated one of the greatest seasons in WMU history, leading the Broncos to a postseason bowl game for the first time since 1961.

The 1988 season began with five consecutive dominating wins over the University of Wisconsin–Madison, the University of Toledo, Illinois State University, Bowling Green, and Miami University by a cumulative score of 177–65. The win over Wisconsin in Madison was WMU's first ever over a Big Ten team.

After a midseason home loss to pre-season MAC favorite Kent State University, WMU found itself with little margin for error during the season's home stretch as the Broncos faced in-state rivals Eastern Michigan University and Central Michigan University in back-to-back contests. In the 31–24 win over EMU, the Bronco defense managed a goal line stand, stopping EMU on the 1 yard line on the last play of the game to preserve the win. The following week against CMU, a then-record crowd of more than 32,000 jammed Waldo Stadium to see WMU rout the rival Chippewas 42–24, which stopped an 11-game winless streak in the heated rivalry dating back to 1976.

That win set up a winner-take-all showdown in Muncie against Ball State University the following week. The winner would claim the outright MAC title and a berth in the California Bowl to face Big West champion Fresno State University. The game was played in soggy conditions and was a defensive struggle. Three field goals by John Creek along with an opportunistic defense carried WMU to the 16–13 win, locking up the school's first outright MAC football championship. In the locker room after the game, Molde credited his players, coaches, and the Kalamazoo community for playing a part in helping to turn one of the MAC's worst programs into a champion in two short seasons.

With the MAC title in hand, WMU played two more meaningless regular season games (losing at Northern Illinois University and winning the home finale against Ohio University) before heading to California for the bowl game.

On December 10, 1988, WMU faced Fresno State in the California Bowl (the game was played at Bulldog Stadium in Fresno, which provided a huge home field advantage for Jim Sweeney's team).

The Broncos entered as significant underdogs, and after falling behind 14–0 early, it appeared that WMU was outgunned. However, WMU reeled off 17 straight points to take a 17–14 lead at halftime and the game remained close throughout, as Fresno State had to rally for a 35–30 win.

WMU wrapped up the 1988 season at 9–3.

Several members of the 1988 team went on to play professionally at some level, including quarterback Tony Kimbrough, offensive lineman Kevin Haverdink, defensive lineman Joel Smeenge, wide receiver Robert Oliver, and running back Robert Davis. Placekicker John Creek is now the in-game analyst for radio broadcasts on the Bronco Radio Network.

==== 1989 season ====
Graduation losses hit the 1989 team hard, and the team was one of the youngest in the MAC. WMU set an NCAA record with four losses by a single point (to Eastern Michigan, Ball State, Toledo, and Bowling Green), and finished the 1989 season at 3–5 in the MAC and 5–6 overall.

==== 1990–92 seasons ====
The 1990 team bounced back to post a solid 7–4 campaign (5–3 in the MAC), and paved the way for a series of winning seasons in years to come. The 1991 and 1992 teams finished 6–5 and 7–3–1, respectively, setting the stage for two of the best teams Molde produced during his tenure.

==== 1993 season ====
The 1993 season started off with a humiliating home loss to I-AA Youngstown State University. It was followed by a tough road loss to Purdue University, which left WMU at 0–2 and facing the prospect of a long season.

However, the Broncos righted the ship and reeled off wins in seven in their last nine games (with one tie) to finish the year at 7–3–1 (6–1–1 in the MAC). Following the 1993 loss to Purdue, WMU embarked on its most successful run during the Molde era.

In its next 14 games, a stretch that covered the remainder of the 1993 season and the first half of 1994, WMU posted a 12–1–1 mark. Due to a quirk in the MAC schedule, WMU and Ball State did not play head-to-head in 1993, which denied Molde's Broncos the chance to earn a second outright MAC title. Instead, Ball State finished 7–0–1 in the conference, won the title, and received the subsequent automatic berth in the Las Vegas Bowl.

Following his team's 14–14 tie with WMU, then-Bowling Green head coach Gary Blackney (whose team had played both WMU and Ball State during the season), remarked, "Western Michigan is by far the best team we've played in the conference."

==== 1994 season ====
With nearly all of the starters returning from the 1993 team, the 1994 Broncos entered the season as MAC favorites.

Early on, they did nothing to disappoint as they raced to a 5–0 mark with wins over Miami, Western Illinois University, Iowa State University, the University of Akron, and Kent State University.

In October, WMU traveled to Mt Pleasant to face arch-rival Central Michigan. This game was a turning point for the WMU program, and many believe that this game was the first step in what turned out to be a controversial ending to the Molde era a few years later. WMU jumped out to a 14–0 lead, but CMU fought back and eventually held off the Broncos in a 35–28 win.

The loss crushed WMU's momentum, as it had been knocking on the door of the AP and Coaches' polls and highlighted the one glaring weakness on Molde's resume. This loss dropped his record against CMU to 2–6 and he would end his career 3–7 vs. CMU.

The following week, WMU's hopes of a MAC title ended with a 16–13 loss to Ball State.

Around this time, team chemistry problems became public, providing a distraction to the team and putting additional stress on the already lukewarm relationship between Molde and WMU's administration, most notably then-WMU president Diether Haenicke.

WMU finished up the 1994 season a disappointing 7–4 (5–3 in the MAC).

==== 1995 season ====
The 1995 season provided a fresh start after many of the disgruntled players from the 1994 team were kicked off the team or graduated. Following a 1–3 start, WMU rebounded to win six of its last seven games, with the lone loss at 16th-ranked Auburn University. The season was highlighted by a 48–31 win over CMU. Following the 1995 season, Molde was promised a contract extension by the WMU administration. By this point, Molde was working for his 4th different athletic director since coming to WMU.

==== 1996 season ====
Molde entered the 1996 campaign with an overall record of 60–38–2, and was the longest-tenured (but among the lowest-paid) coaches in the MAC, but still no contract extension.

After a loss to a nationally ranked University of Wyoming team (led by future Purdue head coach Joe Tiller) dropped the young WMU team to 0–7, the WMU administration announced that Molde's contract would not be renewed following the season.

The announcement ignited a controversy among many Bronco fans who were unhappy with the way Molde was treated by WMU, particularly by Haenicke, who was ultimately responsible for making the decision.

The Broncos closed out the season with back-to-back wins over Bowling Green and Kent State (with the players making a statement against Kent State by winning 76–27) to finish 2–9 overall and 2–6 in the MAC.

Molde finished his WMU career with an overall mark of 62–47–2 having won WMU's first outright MAC title and finishing third or better four times and in the top four in the conference in six of his 10 seasons.

At the time of his departure, he was among the top 10 in career wins (168) for active NCAA Division I-A coaches. Molde remains WMU's all-time leader for wins, tied with Bill Spaulding.

=== Gary Darnell era (1997–2004) ===
Initially the Broncos' fortunes turned around immediately under Gary Darnell, who led WMU to an eight-win season in 1997. The program had a seven-win season in 1998, including a surprising road victory over Vanderbilt, but also had a disappointing loss to Central Michigan. Building on the initial success of the Molde-era recruits, Darnell took the Broncos to back-to-back 1999 and 2000 MAC West Division Championships, falling both years to host Marshall University in Huntington, West Virginia. Because of the loss in the MAC Championship game, the program failed to become bowl eligible and see further post-season play. However, the disappointment wasn't enough to keep Darnell off the scouting list of BCS schools such as North Carolina, Rutgers, Missouri, Oklahoma State, and Virginia Tech. Some say the constant overtures from BCS programs to Darnell led to the program's progressive decline.

The 2001 season saw the momentum of the program slowing, with a five-win season. Slowing further in 2002, the program won four games, managing to defeat both Central Michigan in Mount Pleasant and Eastern Michigan University in the same season. Some optimism was felt in Kalamazoo for the 2003 season, with high expectations for the program dashed quickly, after a blowout by Virginia, and losses began mounting after the Broncos lost to Ball State, Northern Illinois, Marshall, and Toledo. The 2004 season was a complete disaster. After a blowout of Division I-AA UT–Martin, the Broncos piled up nine uninspiring losses, only being competitive against Illinois and Eastern Michigan. But it wasn't enough, for the team lost 10 straight games and didn't beat a single Division I-A team. Despite a slight minority of fans and alumni who wanted to give Darnell one more season, the majority, including the administration, wanted change. The program's attendance in 2004 was abysmal and the program was deep in red ink, ultimately leading to Darnell's termination due to the losing season as well as an aggressive bid for the job by then-incoming Bronco coach, Bill Cubit. Regardless, Coach Darnell would go down as one of the best coaches to come through the Western Michigan program's storied history.

=== Bill Cubit era (2005–2012) ===
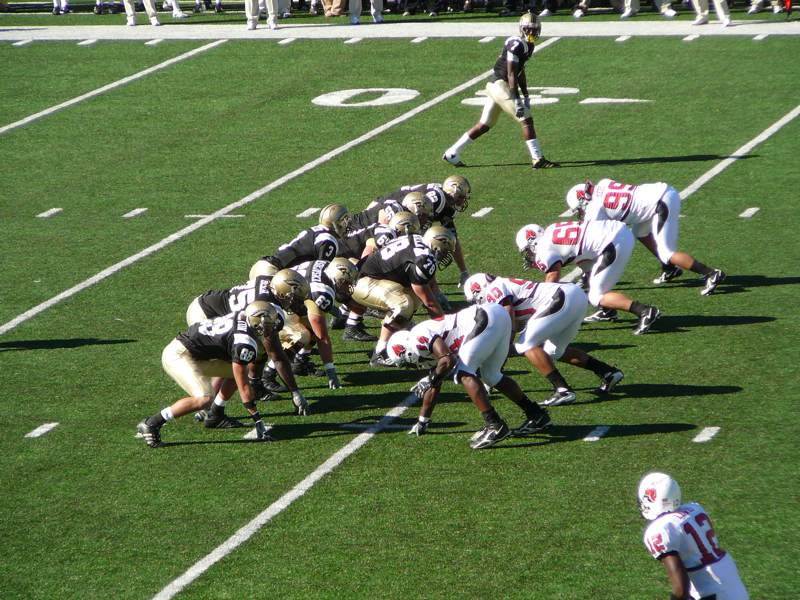
WMU vs. Ball State, October 20, 2007.

After the inaugural season of Bill Cubit in 2005, which was 7–4 and marked a significant improvement in the WMU program from 2004, the Broncos aimed to do well in the 2006 season. The team improved on its record with an 8–5 overall record and strong performances against Indiana and Florida State. In conference play, the Broncos' only setbacks were to Ohio and a lopsided loss to Central Michigan 31–7 in Mt. Pleasant, foreshadowing many seasons of frustration with this rivalry. WMU earned a berth in the International Bowl where it lost 24–31 to Cincinnati, coached by familiar foe Brian Kelly, in his first game as Bearcats coach. 2007 and 2009 were not-so-successful years for Bronco football, as the team registered 5–7 records in both seasons overall, but those years bookended a promising 9–4 2008 season in which the team started 6–1 and defeated Illinois (who had represented the Big Ten with a BCS at-large bid in the Rose Bowl the previous season) going into a week eight matchup at Central Michigan. One of only a handful of setbacks that year, WMU lost both matchups against other contenders including another double digit defeat to Central Michigan 38–28 and again a few weeks later to Ball State. The season that year ended with a 38–14 loss to Rice in the Texas Bowl.

Bill Cubit's WMU team never regained momentum, posting a mediocre 6–6 record in 2010, and not being selected for a bowl game. The 2011 season was equally mediocre though the Broncos improved the win total by one as it posted a 7–6 regular season mark. A 44–14 win over Central Michigan (which snapped a five-game losing streak to the Chippewas) and a strong showing against then No. 24-ranked Illinois gave many plenty reason to be optimistic, but a continued string of losses to Northern Illinois and Toledo did not bode well heading into the Broncos' match-up against Purdue in the Little Caesar's Pizza Bowl. Despite some big plays on offense the Broncos' failed to win their first bowl game with a 37–32 loss in which Purdue took advantage of an unprepared Broncos' special teams recovering an onside kick to capture a key possession late in the game. Jordan White was named the school's first consensus All-American following the 2011 season. The 2012 season was the last for Bill Cubit in Kalamazoo. Consecutive victories against Connecticut and rival Central Michigan were not enough to save Bill Cubit's job after the Broncos lost to Eastern Michigan for the second year in a row and continued losing streaks against Northern Illinois and Toledo en route to a 4–8 mark. The school terminated Cubit as football coach November 17, 2012, following the senior day loss to Eastern Michigan.

=== P. J. Fleck era (2013–2016) ===
P. J. Fleck was named as new head coach of the Broncos on December 18, 2012, making him the youngest Division I FBS head coach at the time. He completely turned the program around in this five years as head coach, starting with a rocky 1–11 record in the 2013 season and ending the regular 2016 undefeated 13–0, with wins over two Big 10 competitors and the school's first-ever national poll rankings for its football program. The 2013 season was Fleck's first as head coach, and resulted in a 1–11 record with one lone win over Massachusetts. Despite the poor start to his WMU coaching career, Fleck turned in the highest-rated recruiting class in MAC history during the following off-season. In 2014, Fleck's recruiting strength seemed to pay off as the Broncos posted to an 8–5 record. The improvement showed the strong efforts given by many players including running back Jarvion Franklin, who earned honors as MAC Freshman of the Year and MAC Offensive Player of the Year.

In 2015, the Broncos opened with a tough non-conference schedule against Big Ten Conference teams Michigan State and Ohio State. They lost 37–24 to the Spartans at home in Waldo Stadium, and again to the Buckeyes in Columbus with a 38–12 final score. Overcoming the losses, the Broncos were able to get their first victory over a ranked team in program with a defeat over No. 24 Toledo, and achieved the program's first bowl game win with a 45–31 win over Middle Tennessee in the 2015 Bahamas Bowl. In 2016, the Broncos finished the regular season 13–0, the best in school history. The undefeated season saw wins over Big Ten opponents Northwestern and Illinois, and put an end to a seven-year losing streak against MAC rival Northern Illinois. The program earned its first-ever Coaches Poll ranking at No. 25 in week six, and received its first AP Poll ranking at No. 24 the following week. On November 19, ESPN's College GameDay hosted its weekly pregame show at Western Michigan for its home game against Buffalo. This was only the second time a MAC team was featured at home by ESPN. Coincidentally, the first College Gameday visit to a MAC school was at Bowling Green in 2003, a game in which Fleck himself played for Northern Illinois.

==== 2016 season ====
Western Michigan ended the regular 2016 season with a 55–35 win over rival Toledo, securing the MAC West division title. They went on to win the MAC Championship game with a 29–23 victory over the Ohio Bobcats on December 2, 2016. After earning the MAC title, the Bronco were ranked No. 12 in the AP Poll, No. 14 in the Coaches Poll, and No. 15 in the CFP poll. Western Michigan lost to No.8 Wisconsin 24–16 in the Cotton Bowl and finished the season 13–1 and 15th in the AP poll and 18th in the coaches poll. On January 6, 2017, Fleck accepted the head coach position at the University of Minnesota, ending his tenure in Kalamazoo with a 30–22 overall record and effectively ending the "Row the Boat" era in Kalamazoo.

=== Tim Lester era (2017–2022) ===
Tim Lester was named as Broncos head coach on January 13, 2017.

==== 2017 season ====
In his first season, Lester's team clinched bowl eligibility with a 6–6 record, but WMU did not receive an invitation as it had only defeated five FBS teams (the team's sixth win was against FCS opponent Wagner).

Although he inherited tons of talent from a team one season removed from the Cotton Bowl, Lester's 2017 Broncos were hit with the injury bug. The team lost 15 starters, including the starting quarterback. The 2017 season saw Lester on the winning side of history, as the team played a 7OT thriller against Buffalo. WMU won 71–68, tying the record for the longest FBS college football game at the time.

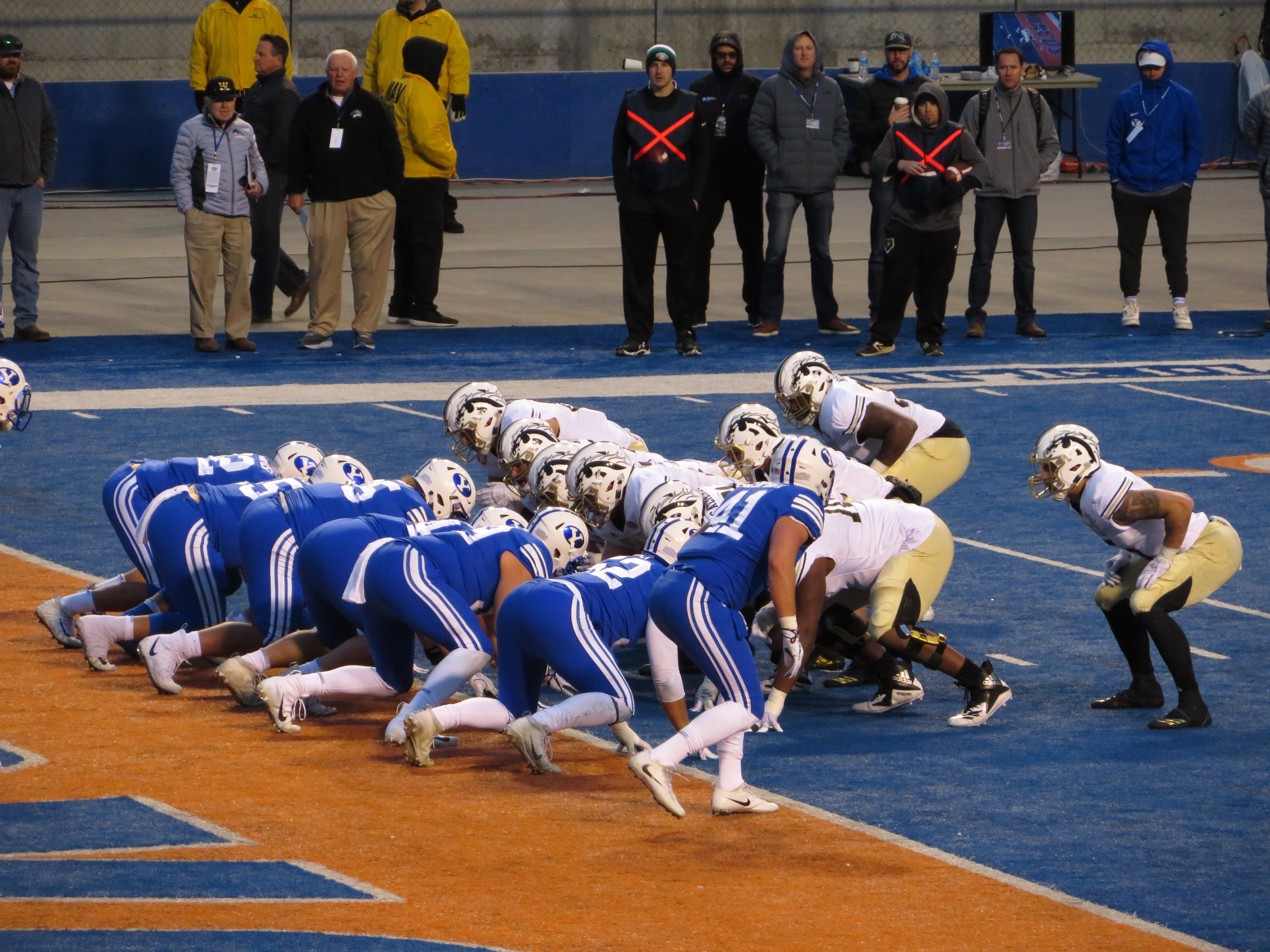
Western Michigan and BYU line up at BYU's goal line during the 2018 Famous Idaho Potato Bowl

==== 2018 season ====
In 2018, the Broncos raced out to a 6–2 start after falling to Power 5 opponents Syracuse (55–42) and Michigan (49–3) to open the season.

The Broncos lost quarterback Jon Wassink again to injury for the second straight season on October 25 against Toledo. WMU lost to Toledo badly and lost the next two to Ohio and Ball State before defeating eventual MAC champion Northern Illinois, 28–21, on November 20.

The Broncos finished the season 7–5 and accepted their second invitation to the Famous Idaho Potato Bowl in five seasons.

WMU faced independent opponent BYU on December 21, 2018, in Boise, ID. BYU defeated the Broncos 49–18, handing Lester his first postseason loss as head coach.

==== 2019 season ====
In 2019, the Broncos finished their non-conference schedule 2–2, with victories over Monmouth (48–13) and Georgia State (57–10) but tough Power 5 losses to Michigan State (51–17) and Syracuse (52–33).

The Broncos would then finish their conference schedule with a 5–3 record, amassing wins over Central Michigan, Miami (OH), Bowling Green, Ball State, and Ohio. Their 7–5 record earn them their second consecutive bowl berth, this time against Western Kentucky in the First Responders Bowl.

The Hilltoppers and Broncos battled for all 4 quarters, with neither team holding more than a 7-point lead. Western Michigan Quarterback Jon Wassink stumbled on an open field scramble to score the go ahead touchdown on third down. With the score tied 20–20, Lester opted to go for it on forth down but an incomplete pass forced the Broncos to turn the ball over on downs. The Hilltoppers then drove down field and scored a last second 52-yard field goal to win the game 23–20.

==== 2020 season ====
The 2020 season was initially canceled for the Mid American Conference due to the COVID-19 pandemic. On September 25, a conference only schedule was implemented, starting on November 5, with each team playing a 6-game schedule; 5 division games, 1 non-division game, and no fans in attendance.

The Broncos came out of the gate strong with a 4–0 start, which included a thrashing of Akron (58–13), and high scoring contest with rival Central Michigan (52–44), a fourth quarter comeback against NIU (30–27), and a thrilling win over Toledo (41–38) where the Broncos recovered an onside kick within the final minute of the game and Sophomore quarterback Kaleb Eleby faked a spike to stop the clock and instead threw a 9-yard touchdown pass to seal the game.

However, back-to-back losses to Eastern Michigan and Ball State cost the Broncos their bid for the 2020 Mid American Conference Championship and bowl bid, finishing the season 4–2.

==== 2021 season ====
In 2021, the Broncos achieved their best non-conference record since 2016.

After losing to Michigan in Week 1, the Broncos went on to win three straight games against Illinois State, on the road at Pittsburgh, and against defending Mountain West Conference champion San Jose State in Kalamazoo.

WMU would then go on to compile a 4–4 conference record, 1–4 against their division, and finishing the regular season 7–5; Tim Lester's third 7–5 season as Western's head coach.

On December 5, the Broncos and seven other MAC schools received bowl bids for the 2021 Postseason, a conference record. WMU was selected to take on the Nevada Wolf Pack at the Quick Lane Bowl on December 27.

The Wolf Pack opened up with a field goal on the opening possession, but after a 100-yard kickoff return from Sean Tyler the Broncos took complete control of the game. Western Michigan went on to win 52–24, finishing the season 8–5 and giving Lester his first postseason victory as head coach of the Broncos.

==== 2022 season ====
In 2022, the Broncos fell to 5–7, and Lester was fired.

=== Lance Taylor era (2023–present) ===
Lance Taylor was named the 17th Head Coach in Western Michigan history on December 8, 2022. On December 13th, 2022, Taylor signed a 5-year $850,000 Deal, making him the highest-paid coach in WMU Football history.

==== 2023 season ====
In 2023, The Broncos finished Taylor's first season as WMU head coach with a 4–8 record, while going 3–5 in the MAC. However, the Broncos were able to win both games against their In-State MAC rivals Eastern and Central Michigan to capture the Michigan MAC Trophy for the first time since 2020.

==== 2024 season ====
After losing to Wisconsin and Ohio State to fall to 0–2, The Broncos defeated FCS Bethune Cookman 59–31 for their first win of 2024. WMU Would then go on to win 4 of the next 5 games against Ball State, Akron, Buffalo and Kent State to take control of 1st place in the MAC to compile a record 5–3 and 4–0 in conference.

The Broncos would then go on to lose the next 3 games. They lost badly to NIU 42–28 and Bowling Green 31–13, and then were upset by rival Central Michigan 16–14, which eliminated WMU from a spot MAC Championship Game. It was also the first time since 2010 that the Chippewas had beaten the Broncos in Mount Pleasant since 2010.

Reeling from a 3-game losing streak, the Broncos found themselves sitting with a record of 5–6 overall heading into the final week of the season. They hosted rival Eastern Michigan (who were also 5–6 coming into the game) needing a win to secure bowl eligibility. With a chilly game-time temperature and snow coming down at Waldo Stadium, both teams remained scoreless late in the 2nd quarter. With 3:41 to go in the 1st half, defensive tackle Anterio Thompson blocked an EMU punt. With the ball sitting free in the end zone and the Broncos looking to recover the ball for a touchdown, Eagles Punter Mitchell Tomasek was forced to bat the ball out of the back of the end zone for a WMU safety. The Broncos went on to score 16 un-answered points in the final 3:41 of the 1st half, and held off a 2nd half EMU rally to win 26–18. With the win, the Broncos finished the regular season 6–6 and 5–3 in the MAC to become Bowl Eligible, and retain the Michigan MAC Trophy for the 2nd consecutive year.

On December 3, 2024, the Broncos were selected to compete in the IS4S Salute To Veterans Bowl against the South Alabama Jaguars on December 14.

The Broncos would fall to the Jaguars 30–23 in the Salute Veterans Bowl to finish the 2024 season with a record of 6–7 overall. Despite racing out to a 10–0 lead in the first quarter, the Broncos stalled on offense the rest of the game and the defense was shredded by South Alabama, giving up a total of 537 yards in the game.

During the Broncos' 34–24 win against Akron on October 12 at Waldo Stadium, the game was delayed for 5 hours and 5 minutes due to lightning in Kalamazoo. The call to suspend the game came with 4:02 remaining in the 3rd quarter and the Broncos leading 31–24. Play resumed at 11:05 pm Eastern Time, and the Broncos added a Luka Zurak 20-yard field goal after the stoppage to close out the win.

==== 2025 season ====
The Broncos season culminated in a Myrtle Beach Bowl Championship and the team's fourth Mid-American Conference football championship, the team's fifth overall conference championship. The 2025 team became the first in program history to win both a conference championship and a bowl game in the same season. With the program's third overall bowl victory, they reached 10 wins for just the second time ever.

WMU extended Lance Taylor's contract through the 2030 season in December following the MAC Championship win, boosting his salary to over $1.2 million annually, adding retention bonuses, and increasing performance incentives for MAC and College Football Playoff success, alongside greater investment in the coaching staff and program.

The team's non-conference schedule included losses to Big Ten foes Michigan State and No. 9 Illinois on the road, sandwiched by a home overtime loss to North Texas of the AAC. The North Texas loss came after the Broncos lost a 10-point lead with 5:19 left in the 4th quarter. A week 5 home win vs. No. 6 (FCS) Rhode Island completed regular season games outside of conference play.

MAC games started in week 4 with a come from behind victory over Toledo with the Broncos scoring the winning touchdown in the last minute of the 4th quarter. Victories against UMass and Ball State ran the conference record to 3–0. Following a bye in week 8, the Broncos fell on the road to Miami (OH) in week 9. Playing Central Michigan at home on a Saturday in front of nearly 30,000 fans, the team enjoyed a 24–21 Victory Cannon win over their biggest rival – once again securing the win by taking their first lead of the game late in the 4th quarter.

Now fully in contention for a spot in the MAC Championship game with a 4–1 conference record, the Broncos beat Ohio at home during a MACtion weekday game. Two more MACtion wins, both on the road, against Northern Illinois and Eastern Michigan finished off the regular season for the Broncos with a 1st place overall finish in the MAC standings at 7–1, securing a birth in the Championship Game at Ford Field in Detroit as the designated home team. The win against EMU also secured the Michigan MAC Trophy outright (WMU went 2–0 vs CMU & EMU).

A rematch was set in the Conference Championship game against Miami (OH), who won tiebreakers with Ohio and Toledo. The Broncos raced out to an early lead and then never trailed securing the team's first MAC Championship since 2016. With a 9–4 record, the 2025 MAC champs were selected to play in the Myrtle Beach Bowl against 10–3 Kennesaw State, the champions of Conference USA. In the bowl game, the Broncos again got off to a fast start leading 27–0 at the end of the 1st quarter and ultimately winning the program's 3rd bowl game by a score of 41–6.

Conference affiliations

- Independent (1906–c.1925)
- Michigan Collegiate Conference (c. 1926–c. 1931)
- Independent (c.1932–1947)
- Mid-American Conference (1948–present)

== Championships ==
=== Conference championships ===
Western Michigan has won five conference championships.

Season	Conference	Head coach	Overall record	Conference record
1929†	Michigan Collegiate Conference	Mike Gary	5–2–1	2–0–1
1966†	Mid-American Conference	Bill Doolittle	7–3	5–1
1988	Mid-American Conference	Al Molde	9–3	7–1
2016	Mid-American Conference	P. J. Fleck	13–1	8–0
2025	Mid-American Conference	Lance Taylor	10–4	7–1

† Co-champions

=== Division championships ===
Year	Division	Coach	Opponent	CG result
1999	MAC West	Gary Darnell	Marshall	L 30–34
2000	MAC West	Gary Darnell	Marshall	L 14–19
2015†	MAC West	P. J. Fleck	N/A lost tiebreaker to Northern Illinois	
2016	MAC West	P. J. Fleck	Ohio	W 29–23

† Co-champions

== Bowl games ==
Western Michigan University has participated in thirteen football bowl games in three countries in its history, compiling a record of 3–10. The Broncos most recent bowl game was a 41-6 victory in the Myrtle Beach Bowl against Kennesaw State on December 19, 2025.

Year	Bowl	Host city	Opponent	Result
1961	Aviation Bowl	Dayton, OH	New Mexico	L 12–28
1988	California Bowl	Fresno, CA	Fresno State	L 30–35
2006	International Bowl	Toronto, ON	Cincinnati	L 24–27
2008	Texas Bowl	Houston, TX	Rice	L 14–38
2011	Little Caesars Pizza Bowl	Detroit, MI	Purdue	L 32–37
2014	Famous Idaho Potato Bowl	Boise, ID	Air Force	L 24–38
2015	Bahamas Bowl	Nassau, Bahamas	Middle Tennessee	W 45–31
2016	Cotton Bowl Classic †	Arlington, TX	Wisconsin	L 16–24
2018	Famous Idaho Potato Bowl	Boise, ID	BYU	L 18–49
2019	First Responder Bowl	University Park, TX	Western Kentucky	L 20–23
2021	Quick Lane Bowl	Detroit, MI	Nevada	W 52–24
2024	Veterans Bowl	Montgomery, AL	South Alabama	L 23–30
2025	Myrtle Beach Bowl	Conway, SC	Kennesaw State	W 41–6

† New Year's Six game

== Rivalries ==
=== Central Michigan ===
These archrivals first met in 1907 and have faced one another annually since 1943. Since the two schools are separated by a two-hour drive, the visiting team typically has a strong fan and student presence at the game. The winner of the game receives the Victory Cannon Trophy. WMU leads the series overall 55–40–2 as of the end of the 2026 season.

=== Michigan MAC Trophy ===
Western Michigan competes with Central Michigan and Eastern Michigan for the Michigan MAC Trophy. A team wins the trophy outright by defeating the other two during the MAC regular season.

As of 2026, WMU has won 11 Michigan MAC Football Trophies in the years 2005, 2014, 2015, 2016, 2018, 2019†, 2020†, 2023, 2024†, 2025, 2026.

† Tie; retained trophy as all three teams finished 1–1

=== Toledo ===
The Western Michigan and Toledo football rivalry is a significant one within the Mid-American Conference (MAC).

== Retired numbers ==
Western Michigan Broncos retired numbers
No.	Player	Pos.	Tenure	No. ret.	Ref.
44	Jerome Persell	HB	1975–1978	1978	
49	John Offerdahl	LB	1982–1985	1995	

== NCAA records ==
The following players hold individual NCAA records:

- Corey Davis, NCAA FBS all-time leader in receiving yards with 5,205 yards.
- Corey Alston, most receiving yards gained by a freshman in a game, 263 yards on nine catches vs. Eastern Michigan, November 1, 1997
- Jason Babin
  - Most tackles for loss in a season, 32 tackles (31 solo and 2 assisted in 12 games), 2003
  - Most tackles for loss in a career, 75 tackles (73 solo and 4 assisted in 47 games), 2000–03
- Cory Flom, most blocked field goals in a game, 2 blocked kicks vs. Indiana, September 2, 2006
- Tim Hiller
  - Most plays by a freshman in a game, 80 plays vs. Ball State, October 8, 2005
  - Most touchdown passes thrown on consecutive plays, 3 touchdowns vs. Central Michigan, November 12, 2005 (76, 7 and 40 yards in 1:59 of playing time overlapping first and second quarters)
- Ameer Ismail
  - Most sacks in a game, 6 sacks vs Ball State, October 21, 2006
  - Most tackles for loss in 2006, 25.5 tackles
  - Most sacks in 2006, 17 sacks
- Greg Jennings
  - Most 1,000 yard receiving seasons, 3 seasons, 2003: 1,050 yards, 2004: 1,092 yards, 2005: 1,259 yards
  - Most receptions per game in 2005, 8.9/game
- Tim Lester, most seasons gaining 2,000 or more yards passing, 4 seasons, 1996: 2,189 yards, 1997: 2,160 yards, 1998: 3,311 yards, 1999: 3,639 yards
- Mike Prindle
  - Most points scored by kicking in a game, 24 points (seven field goals and three point after touchdowns) vs. Marshall, September 29, 1984
  - Most field goals attempted in a game, 9 attempts vs. Marshall, September 29, 1984
  - Most field goals made in a game, 7 field goals vs. Marshall, September 29, 1984

The following are team NCAA records:

- Jordan White (1,378 yards on 94 catches) and Juan Nunez (1,032 yards on 91 catches), two or more players on the same team each gaining at least 1,000 yards receiving, 2010
- Team led NCAA in passing defense in 1976, 78.5 yards/game
- Team led NCAA in passing defense in 1992, 83.2 yards/game
- NCAA Most improved team in 1997, 6 wins more than in 1996

== Former and current NFL players ==
The following players played in the National Football League and WMU.

- Richard Ash – DT, undrafted
- Jason Babin – LB, drafted 1st round (27th overall) of 2004 NFL draft
- Zaire Barnes – LB, drafted 6th round (184th overall) of 2023 NFL draft
- Willie Beavers – OT, drafted 4th round (121st overall) of 2016 NFL draft
- E. J. Biggers – DB, drafted 7th round (217th overall) of 2009 NFL draft
- Freddie Bishop – DE, undrafted
- Daniel Braverman – WR, drafted 7th round (230th overall) of 2016 NFL draft
- Ray Bray – G/DG, drafted 9th round (76th overall) of 1939 NFL draft
- Ed Chlebek – QB, undrafted
- Terry Crews – LB, drafted 11th round (281st overall) of 1991 NFL draft
- Corey Davis – WR, drafted 1st round (5th overall) of 2017 NFL draft
- Louis Delmas – DB, drafted 2nd round (33rd overall) by Detroit Lions of 2009 NFL draft
- Tyson DeVree – TE, undrafted, DeVree played at WMU his freshman and sophomore years before transferring
- Donnie Ernsberger – TE Ernsberger signed with the Tampa Bay Buccaneers as an undrafted free agent on April 28, 2018.
- D'Wayne Eskridge – WR, drafted 2nd round 56th overall) of 2021 NFL draft
- Tom Flacco – QB, undrafted
- Mark Garalczyk – DT/DE, drafted 6th round (146th overall) of 1987 NFL draft
- Gene Hamlin – C, undrafted
- Kevin Haverdink – T, drafted 5th round (133rd overall) of 1989 NFL draft
- Steve Hawkins – WR, drafted 6th round (166th overall) of 1994 NFL draft
- Paul Hazel – LB, undrafted
- Paul Hutchins – T, drafted 6th round (152nd overall) of 1993 NFL draft
- Greg Jennings – WR, drafted 2nd round (52nd overall) of 2006 NFL draft
- Bilhal Kone – CB, drafted 6th round (178th overall) of 2025 NFL draft
- Marshawn Kneeland – DE, drafted 2nd round (56th overall) of 2024 NFL draft
- Dale Livingston – K, drafted 3rd round (83rd overall) of 1968 NFL/AFL draft
- John Lomakoski – T, drafted 4th round (48th overall) of 1962 NFL draft
- Bob Lurtsema – DT/DE, undrafted
- Art Macioszczyk – FB, drafted 27th round (252nd pick) of 1943 NFL draft
- Chris Maragos – WR, undrafted, played at WMU his freshman year before transferring
- Joel Mason – E, undrafted
- Jack Matheson – E/G, undrafted
- Rodney McGraw – DE, undrafted
- Jaylon Moore – G, drafted 5th round (155th overall) of 2021 NFL draft
- Skyy Moore – WR, drafted 2nd round (54th overall) of 2022 NFL draft
- Rocco Moore – G/T, drafted 11th round (283rd overall) of 1977 NFL draft
- Jake Moreland – FB/TE, undrafted
- Kendrick Mosley – WR, undrafted
- Taylor Moton – T, drafted 2nd round (64th overall) of 2017 NFL draft
- Tom Nütten – G/C, drafted 7th round (221st overall) of 1995 NFL draft
- John Offerdahl – LB, drafted 2nd round (52nd overall) of 1986 NFL draft
- Chukwuma Okorafor – T, drafted 3rd round (92nd overall) of 2018 NFL draft
- Darius Phillips – CB, drafted 5th round (170th overall) of 2018 NFL draft
- John Potter – K, drafted 7th round (251st overall) of 2012 NFL draft
- Mike Prindle – K, undrafted
- John Rapacz – C/LB, drafted 3rd round (15th overall) of 1947 NFL draft
- Joe Reitz – OT, undrafted, Reitz only played college basketball at WMU
- Rudy Rosatti – T, undrafted
- Bob Rowe – DT/DE, drafted 2nd round (43rd overall) of 1967 NFL/AFL draft
- Tony Scheffler – TE, drafted second round (61st overall) of 2006 NFL draft
- Tom Sims – DT/NT, drafted 6th round (152nd overall) of 1990 NFL draft
- Joel Smeenge – DE/LB, drafted 3rd round (71st overall) of 1990 NFL draft
- Warren Smith – G, undrafted
- Robert Spillane – LB, undrafted
- Tom Toth – G/T, drafted 4th round (102nd overall) of 1985 NFL draft
- Jordan White – WR, drafted 7th round (244th overall) of 2012 NFL draft
- Pete Wysocki – LB, undrafted
- Wesley French – C, undrafted

== Media ==
Live coverage of Western Michigan University athletics are covered mostly by Bronco Insider through the school's athletics website, http://www.wmubroncos.com, or occasionally on http://www.mac-sports.com, the MAC's official website. Video is provided online for most WMU home football, basketball (men's and women's), baseball and hockey games, as well as some away games. Games can be viewed by purchasing them a la carte or by paying a fixed monthly or yearly subscription fee.

=== Bronco Radio Network ===
The Bronco Radio Network (BRN) covers football, hockey and men's and women's basketball in various southwestern Michigan markets. In addition to video, the BRN audio feed is also available through the Bronco Insider service offered by WMU athletics.

- 94.1 FM WWDK: Lansing, Battle Creek, Jackson, (football, men's basketball)
- 96.1 FM WMAX: Grand Rapids, Muskegon, Holland, Grand Haven (football, men's basketball)
- 96.5 FM WZOX: Portage, Kalamazoo (flagship station: football, men's basketball, hockey)
- 100.1 FM WBCH: Hastings (football, hockey)
- 1660 AM WQLR: Kalamazoo(flagship station: women's basketball)
- 1130 AM WDFN: Detroit (select football, men's basketball)

=== Bronco Review ===
==== Radio ====
Bronco Review is a weekly radio show that reviews the recent ongoings of the Western Michigan University athletic programs.

- 1660 AM WQLR: Kalamazoo

==== TV ====
Bronco Review featuring the voice of the Broncos, Robin Hook, includes highlights and post-game comments after every WMU football game. The 30-minute show airs weekly on WLLA TV-64 on Thursdays at 7:30 p.m. and repeat each Saturday at 10:30 a.m.

=== Bronco Update ===
Bronco Update is a daily update on issues that are immediately impacting the Western Michigan University athletic programs.

- 92.5 FM WZUU: Mattawan, Kalamazoo
- 92.7 FM WYVN: Holland, Saugatuck, South Haven, Grand Haven
- 100.9 FM WQXC: Allegan, Kalamazoo
- 590 AM WKZO: Kalamazoo
- 1400 AM WBFN: Battle Creek
- 1590 AM WTVB: Coldwater
- 1660 AM WQLR: Kalamazoo

ESPN also offers coverage of some MAC football and basketball games, as well as Comcast Local which is a regional network available to Comcast cable subscribers in Michigan, Indiana and Ohio which is where most MAC schools are located.

Print media coverage is offered by the Kalamazoo Gazette and The Grand Rapids Press, as well as the school's daily newspaper, the Western Herald and http://mlive.com.

== Future non-conference opponents ==
The following table lists WMU's future scheduled non-conference opponents as of September 22, 2026.

2026	2027	2028	2029	2030	2031	2032	2033	2034
September 5 at Michigan	September 2 Bryant	September 2 at Michigan State	September 1 at Michigan	September 7 Delaware	August 30 at Michigan State	September 4 at Illinois	September 10 FIU	September 23 at Georgia Southern
September 12 Monmouth	September 11 at Pittsburgh	September 16 at Iowa	September 15 Stony Brook	September 14 at FIU	September 13 Georgia Southern			
September 19 at Rice	September 18 at Tennessee	September 23 at Delaware	September 22 at Boise State		September 20 at North Texas			
September 26 Boise State	September 25 Rice							
