= Jordan White (American football) =

American football player (born 1988)

No. 89
- Position: Wide receiver

Personal information
- Born: June 4, 1988 (age 38); Middleburg Heights, Ohio, U.S.
- Listed height: 6 ft 0 in (1.83 m)
- Listed weight: 215 lb (98 kg)

Career information
- High school: North Ridgeville (North Ridgeville, Ohio)
- College: Western Michigan
- NFL draft: 2012: 7th round, 244th overall pick

Career history
- New York Jets (2012)

Awards and highlights
- First-team All-American (2011); 2× First-team All-MAC (2010, 2011)

Career NFL statistics
- Receptions: 1
- Receiving yards: 13
- Stats at Pro Football Reference

Jordan White (born June 4, 1988) is an American former professional football player who was a wide receiver for the New York Jets of the National Football League (NFL). He played college football for the Western Michigan Broncos. He was selected by the Jets in the seventh round of the 2012 NFL draft.

As a senior in 2011 at Western Michigan, he led all players in the NCAA Football Bowl Subdivision in total receiving yards (1,911), total receptions (140), receiving yards per game (147.0) and receptions per game (10.77). He was named a first-team All-American.

== Early life ==
White finished his high school career at North Ridgeville High School in North Ridgeville, Ohio with career marks of 51 receptions for 646 yards, 21 carries for 352 yards, 15 total touchdowns, and a 38.9 yards per punt average. He was named first-team All-Lorain County both his junior and senior year, as well as an honorable mention for the all-state team.

== College career ==
=== 2007 season ===
After redshirting during the 2006 season, White appeared in nine games for the Broncos. He made his first reception against West Virginia University, and his first career touchdown against Ball State.

=== 2009 season ===
After missing the 2008 season due to injury, White finished the 2009 season with four 100-yard receiving games, and earned his first spot on the post-season All-MAC Awards (Third-team).

=== 2010 season ===
2010 was White's break out year. The Sports Illustrate Honorable Mention All American led the team in receiving yardage (1,378 total yards), as well as took over punt return duties for the Broncos. The 1,378 yards receiving broke the single-season school record set two years prior by Jamarko Simmons. White was named to All-MAC First-team, along with fellow Bronco receiver, Juan Nunez, and a Fred Biletnikoff Award semi-finalist for the best college football receiver in the nation.

=== 2011 season ===
White was given a sixth year of eligibility by the NCAA to return to Western Michigan due to his injuries during the 2008 season. On November 8, 2011, he caught a career-high 16 passes for 238 yards against Toledo. During the 2011 regular season, White had 127 receptions for 1,646 yards, ranking first among NCAA Division I FBS players in both categories. He also led the FBS with averages of 10.57 receptions per game and 137.17 receiving yards per game.

White was named as a Biletnikoff Award semi-finalist for the second consecutive season. He also received All-Conference First-team honors for the second consecutive season. He was also named Walter Camp Football Foundation Second-team All American and American Football Coaches Association All American. On December 15, Jordan White was named Associated Press All-American. By receiving this honor, Jordan White became the first "consensus" All-American in school history at Western Michigan University.

=== College statistics ===
Receiving

Season	Games	Receptions	Total yards	Yards per reception	Touchdowns	Long	Yards per game
2006	Did not play – redshirt						
2007	9	19	217	11.4	1	50	24.1
2008	Did not play – injury						
2009	9	53	681	12.9	4	54	75.7
2010	12	94	1,378	14.7	10	74	114.8
2011	13	140*	1,911*	13.7	17	61	147.0*
Total	43	306	4,187	13.7	32	74	97.4

* Led NCAA Division I

== Professional career ==
Pre-draft measurables
Height	Weight	Arm length	Hand span	Wingspan	40-yard dash	10-yard split	20-yard split	20-yard shuttle	Three-cone drill	Vertical jump	Broad jump	Bench press
5 ft 11 3/4 in (1.82 m)	208 lb (94 kg)	31 1/2 in (0.80 m)	9 1/4 in (0.23 m)	6 ft 3 5/8 in (1.92 m)	4.60 s	1.56 s	2.64 s	4.10 s	6.76 s	35.0 in (0.89 m)	9 ft 11 in (3.02 m)	14 reps
All values from NFL Combine/Pro Day

The New York Jets chose White using their seventh round pick in the 2012 NFL Draft. White suffered a fractured bone in his left foot on May 21, 2012 and surgery was subsequently performed two days later. White signed a four-year $2.145 million contract on June 14, 2012. He was waived on August 31, 2012. White was signed to the practice squad a day later.

White was released from the squad on September 28, 2012. He was re-signed to the practice squad on October 2, 2012. He was promoted to the active roster on November 22, 2012. White was released on August 4, 2013.

== See also ==
- List of NCAA major college football yearly receiving leaders
