= Tom Nütten =

American gridiron football player (born 1971)

Tom Nutten
No. 64, 68, 62, 61
- Position: Guard

Personal information
- Born: June 8, 1971 (age 55); Toledo, Ohio, U.S.
- Listed height: 6 ft 5 in (1.96 m)
- Listed weight: 280 lb (127 kg)

Career information
- High school: Bishop's College School (Sherbrooke, Quebec, Canada)
- College: Western Michigan
- NFL draft: 1995: 7th round, 221st overall pick
- CFL draft: 1995: Bonusth round, 1st overall pick

Career history
- Buffalo Bills (1995); Denver Broncos (1997)*; Hamilton Tiger-Cats (1997); Amsterdam Admirals (1998); St. Louis Rams (1998–2002); New York Jets (2003)*; St. Louis Rams (2004–2005)
- * Offseason or practice squad member only

Awards and highlights
- Super Bowl champion (XXXIV)

Career NFL statistics
- Games played: 78
- Games started: 69
- Fumble recoveries: 3
- Stats at Pro Football Reference

Tom Nütten (pronounced [ˈnʏtən]; born June 8, 1971) is an American former professional football player who was a guard for eight seasons in the National Football League (NFL), primarily with the St. Louis Rams. He was raised in Oelde, Germany and played high school football in Magog, Quebec and at Bishop's College School in Lennoxville, Quebec.

== Biography ==
Nütten was born in Toledo, Ohio and raised in Oelde, Germany. He later moved to Montreal as a teenager.

He played college football at Champlain Lennoxville – Prep School located on the Bishop's University campus, also in Lennoxville, and at Western Michigan University in Kalamazoo, Michigan.

He was selected by the Buffalo Bills in the seventh round of the 1995 NFL draft, but the Bills released him before the season started. Nütten spent the majority of his career with the Rams, where he started in two Super Bowls. In 2003, he joined the New York Jets but retired before ever playing a game. In 2004, he came out of retirement to finish his career with the Rams.

== Personal life ==
Nütten lives in Florida with his wife, Allison, their two sons, Tyson and Tristan, and daughter, Nola.

== See also ==
- List of Bishop's College School alumni
