= Jon Wassink =

American football player (born 1997)

No. 16
- Position: Quarterback

Personal information
- Born: February 4, 1997 (age 29); Grand Rapids, Michigan, U.S.
- Listed height: 6 ft 2 in (1.88 m)
- Listed weight: 208 lb (94 kg)

Career information
- High school: South Christian (Byron Center, Michigan)
- College: Western Michigan (2015–2019)

Awards and highlights
- Wuerffel Trophy (2019); Third-team All-MAC (2019)

Jon Wassink (born February 4, 1997) is an American former college football player who was a quarterback for the Western Michigan Broncos.

== Early life ==
Wassink attended South Christian High School in Byron Center, Michigan where he played basketball and football. As a football player, he played quarterback, defensive back, punter, and kicker. As a high school senior, he led his team to a MHSAA Division 4 state title, throwing for 179 yards and three touchdowns, rushing for another 122 and a touchdown, while also kicking two extra points and scoring a two-point conversion. Ranked a three-star recruit, his recruitment was considered somewhat unusual as he opted to spend more time with family rather than attend camps or recruiting trips. He committed to play football at Western Michigan at the end of his junior year and signed his letter of intent in February 2015.

College recruiting
Name	Hometown	School	Height	Weight	Commit date
Jon Wassink; QB	Grand Rapids, Michigan	South Christian High School	6 ft 2 in (1.88 m)	190 lb (86 kg)	May 3, 2014
Jon Wassink; QB	Recruit ratings: Rivals: 247Sports: (70)				
Overall recruit ranking:
Note: In many cases, Scout, Rivals, 247Sports, On3, and ESPN may conflict in their listings of height and weight.; In these cases, the average was taken. ESPN grades are on a 100-point scale.; Sources: "2015 Team Ranking". Rivals.com.

== College career ==
=== 2015 season ===
Wassink did not see any game action in 2015 and was subsequently redshirted.

=== 2016 season ===
As a redshirt freshman, Wassink did not see any game action but ran the scout team as Western Michigan rolled to a 13–1 record and a MAC championship.

=== 2017 season ===
Entering the season with a new head coach, Wassink was named the starting quarterback for the season opener against ranked opponent USC. He threw for 67 yards and a touchdown while also rushing for another touchdown in a 49–31 loss. He played in seven more games before suffering a broken collarbone against Eastern Michigan and missing the remainder of the season.

=== 2018 season ===
Wassink once again entered the 2018 season as the Broncos starting quarterback. After starting the first seven games of the season, he was added to the Manning Award watchlist after racking up 1,929 passing yards and 16 touchdowns. This achievement was short-lived as he suffered an injury to his right foot against Toledo and missed the remainder of the season once again. He earned his bachelor's in accountancy from Western Michigan in spring 2018.

=== 2019 season ===
Aiming to play a full season, Wassink led the Broncos to a 7–5 record and an invite to the First Responder Bowl. He threw for 193 yards with a touchdown and an interception, but the Broncos ultimately lost to Western Kentucky on a last second field goal 23–20.

At the end of the season, Wassink was named the recipient of the Wuerffel Trophy, given to the college football player "who best combines exemplary community service with athletic and academic achievement." He was also named to the All-MAC team as a member of the third-team offense.

After initially training for the 2020 NFL draft, Wassink elected not to pursue a professional football career, citing the lack of interest from agents and no pro day due to the COVID-19 pandemic.

=== College statistics ===
Year	Team	Class	GP	Passing							Rushing				Receiving			
Year	Team	Class	GP	Cmp	Att	Pct	Yds	TD	Int	Rtg	Att	Yds	Avg	TD	Rec	Yds	Avg	TD
2015	Western Michigan	FR	0	(redshirt) Redshirted														
2016	Western Michigan	FR	0	DNP														
2017	Western Michigan	SO	8	124	193	64.2	1,391	14	4	112.8	41	126	3.1	3	2	40	20.0	2
2018	Western Michigan	JR	9	151	245	61.6	1,994	16	6	146.7	46	162	3.5	6	0	0	0.0	0
2019	Western Michigan	SR	13	241	407	59.2	3,097	20	8	135.4	69	319	4.6	3	0	0	0.0	0
Career			30	516	845	61.1	6,482	50	18	140.8	156	607	3.9	12	2	40	20.0	2

== Personal life ==
Wassink married Ally Smith in January 2020.
