= Mike Prindle =

American football player (born 1963)

No. 19
- Position: Placekicker

Personal information
- Born: November 12, 1963 (age 62); Grand Rapids, Michigan, U.S.
- Listed height: 5 ft 9 in (1.75 m)
- Listed weight: 160 lb (73 kg)

Career information
- High school: Union High School (MI)
- College: Western Michigan
- NFL draft: 1985: undrafted

Career history
- Los Angeles Raiders (1985)*; Atlanta Falcons (1986)*; Detroit Lions (1987); Tampa Bay Buccaneers (1988)*; Phoenix Cardinals (1989)*
- * Offseason or practice squad member only

Career NFL statistics
- Field goals made: 6
- Field goals attempted: 7
- Field goal %: 85.7%
- Longest field goal: 35
- Stats at Pro Football Reference

Michael John Prindle (born November 12, 1963) is a former National Football League (NFL) placekicker. Prindle played one season for the Detroit Lions in 1987.

== Early life ==
Prindle was a kicker and quarterback for Grand Rapids Union High School. On October 31, 1980, he kicked a 55-yard field goal against Muskegon High School, the fifth longest in Michigan high school history.

== College career ==
Prindle went on to kick for Western Michigan University from 1981 to 1984. During his career at WMU he kicked 55 consecutive point after attempts (PATs) to make him the best kicker in WMU history up to the time he attended. He has been named to the WMU All-Century Football Team as one of the top 100 student-athletes in WMU history.

In 1984 Prindle kicked seven field goals in a single game for Western Michigan vs Marshall University in 1984, to tie the NCAA college record for all divisions. He was determined by his coach to have made 20 kicks for the day including kickoffs, while starting quarterback Steve Hoffman had thrown only 21 passes. Said coach Jack Harbaugh: "It's the only time I know of that we had to ice the kicker's leg instead of the quarterback's arm."

== Professional career ==
Prindle attempted to play professional football. He was not drafted, but signed with the Los Angeles Raiders out of college in 1985. He did not make the final roster and had opportunities with the Atlanta Falcons, Tampa Bay Buccaneers and Phoenix Cardinals before being signed as a replacement player in 1987 for the Detroit Lions. Prindle played in three games and scored 24 points. His NFL career was six made point after attempts in six attempts. He attempted seven field goals, making six of them for a field goal percentage of 85.7%.
