= Jamarko Simmons =

American football player (born 1986)

No. 27, 80
- Position: Wide receiver

Personal information
- Born: September 23, 1986 (age 40); Flint, Michigan, U.S.
- Listed height: 6 ft 3 in (1.91 m)
- Listed weight: 235 lb (107 kg)

Career information
- High school: Flint Central
- College: Western Michigan
- NFL draft: 2009: undrafted

Career history
- Green Bay Packers (2009)*; Jacksonville Sharks (2011); Virginia Destroyers (2011); New York Jets (2011)*; Jacksonville Sharks (2012); San Jose SaberCats (2013); Iowa Barnstormers (2014)*; Las Vegas Outlaws (2015)
- * Offseason or practice squad member only

Awards and highlights
- UFL champion (2011); ArenaBowl champion (2011)

Career AFL statistics
- Receptions: 131
- Receiving yards: 1,394
- Receiving touchdowns: 35
- Rushing yards: 74
- Rushing touchdowns: 21
- Stats at ArenaFan.com
- Stats at Pro Football Reference

Jamarko Simmons (born September 23, 1986) is an American former football wide receiver. He was originally signed by the Green Bay Packers as an undrafted free agent in 2009 but was cut after sustaining a leg injury that sidelined him for several weeks.

== Early life ==
Simmons played high school football, basketball and track for Flint Central High School in Flint, Michigan.

== College career ==
Simmons played football at Western Michigan University, and was a standout wide receiver. He is the Broncos all-time receptions leader.

== Professional career ==
=== Virginia Destroyers ===
Simmons was signed by the Virginia Destroyers of the United Football League on July 6, 2011. Simmons helped the Destroyers win the 2011 UFL Championship Game.

=== Jacksonville Sharks ===
Simmons signed with the Jacksonville Sharks of the Arena Football League on July 19, 2011. Simmons was a key contributor for the Sharks throughout the 2011 season. The Sharks won Arena Bowl XXVI, in which Simmons scored three touchdowns.

=== New York Jets ===
Simmons was signed by the New York Jets to their practice squad on October 31, 2011. Simmons was placed on the practice squad injured reserve list on December 12, 2011 after suffering a back injury.

=== Jacksonville Sharks ===
On April 10, 2012, it was announced that Simmons signed on for his second stint with the Jacksonville Sharks.

=== San Jose SaberCats ===
Simmons played the 2013 season with the San Jose SaberCats.

=== Iowa Barnstormers ===
On November 22, 2013, the SaberCats traded Simmons to the Iowa Barnstormers in exchange for waiver positioning.

=== Las Vegas Outlaws ===
On October 28, 2014, Simmons was assigned to the Las Vegas Outlaws.
