= Daniel Braverman =

American football player (born 1993)

No. 83
- Positions: Wide receiver, kick returner

Personal information
- Born: September 28, 1993 (age 33); Miramar, Florida, U.S.
- Listed height: 5 ft 10 in (1.78 m)
- Listed weight: 185 lb (84 kg)

Career information
- High school: NSU University (Fort Lauderdale, Florida)
- College: Western Michigan
- NFL draft: 2016: 7th round, 230th overall pick

Career history
- Chicago Bears (2016); Kansas City Chiefs (2017–2018)*; Arizona Cardinals (2018)*; San Antonio Commanders (2019)*; Calgary Stampeders (2019)*; St. Louis BattleHawks (2020); Toronto Argonauts (2021)
- * Offseason or practice squad member only

Awards and highlights
- First-team All-MAC (2015)
- Stats at Pro Football Reference

Daniel Braverman (born September 28, 1993) is an American former professional football wide receiver and kick returner. He played college football at Western Michigan, and was selected by the Chicago Bears in the seventh round of the 2016 NFL draft.

== Early life ==
Braverman was born in Miramar, Florida, grew up in South Florida, and is Catholic. His father, Jamie Braverman, played safety in 1977 on Lehigh University’s NCAA Division II national title team.

Braverman played football and ran the 100 meter dash, the 4 × 100, and the 400 meters in track at University School of Nova Southeastern University in Fort Lauderdale, Florida. He was a two-time all-Broward County selection in football. He was among the fastest high school football players in South Florida, running the 40-yard dash in 4.47 seconds.

== College career ==
Braverman played college football on scholarship for the Western Michigan Broncos in the Mid-American Conference (MAC).

On September 8, 2012, Braverman scored his first touchdown on his first collegiate touch, scoring on a nine-yard run against Eastern Illinois. On September 15, Braverman participated on his first career start at Minnesota. On October 27, 2012, Braverman caught a career-high 5 catches against Northern Illinois.

Braverman red-shirted the 2013 season, due to a torn right anterior cruciate ligament suffered in April of that year. On August 30, 2014, Braverman opened the 2014 season with a career-high 10 catches for a career-high 130 yards against Purdue. In 2014, he was # 1 in the MAC in receptions (86), # 4 in punt returns (15), and # 5 in receiving yards (997).

During the 2015 regular season, he had 108 receptions for 1,367 yards and 13 touchdowns and # 2 in the NCAA Division I Football Bowl Subdivision (FBS) in receptions. In 2015, he was the only player in the FBS to make over 100 catches, have over 1,350 receiving yards, and have 13 or more touchdowns. In 2015, he was also # 2 in the MAC in receiving touchdowns (13), # 3 in receiving yards, and # 5 in yards from scrimmage (1,380).

In his three-year Western Michigan college career, he started 27 of 37 games, catching 213 passes for 2,509 yards (11.8 avg.) and 19 touchdowns, and ran 76 yards on 12 rush attempts (6.3 avg.). On special teams, he made 24 punt returns for 109 yards (4.5 avg.) and 15 kickoff returns for 312 yards (20.8 avg.). He was twice named a Jewish Sports Review All-American.

At the conclusion of his junior season, Braverman declared for the NFL draft.

=== Statistics ===
YR	GP	GS	REC	YDS	AVG	LG	TD
2012	11	1	18	135	7.5	38	0
2013	Redshirt – injury						
2014	13	13	86	997	11.6	63	6
2015	13	13	108	1367	12.7	68	13

== Professional career ==
Pre-draft measurables
Height	Weight	40-yard dash	20-yard shuttle	Three-cone drill	Vertical jump	Broad jump	Bench press
5 ft 10 in (1.78 m)	177 lb (80 kg)	4.47 s	4.2 s	6.86 s	28 1/2 in (0.72 m)	9 ft 4 in (2.84 m)	10 reps
All values from Western Michigan Pro Day

=== Chicago Bears ===
Braverman was selected in the seventh round, 230th overall by the Chicago Bears in the 2016 NFL draft. According to Pro Football Focus, Braverman averaged more yards-per-route from the slot than any receiver drafted in 2016. Mel Kiper Jr. of ESPN said: "He kind of reminds you of a (Danny) Amendola, (Julian) Edelman type.... He's quick after the catch, he's aggressive, he's tough, (and) he'll break tackles."

On May 9, 2016, Braverman signed a four-year, $2.4 million contract with the Bears with a $79,000 signing bonus. On September 3, he was released by the Bears as part of final roster cuts and was signed to the practice squad the next day. He was promoted to the active roster on November 29, 2016. In 2016, he played three games for the Bears.

On September 2, 2017, Braverman was waived by the Bears.

=== Kansas City Chiefs ===
On January 2, 2018, Braverman was signed to the Kansas City Chiefs' practice squad. He signed a reserve/future contract with the Chiefs on January 10. He was waived on September 1, 2018.

=== Arizona Cardinals ===
On December 4, 2018, Braverman was signed to the Arizona Cardinals practice squad. He was released on December 20, 2018.

=== San Antonio Commanders ===
Braverman was signed to a contract from the rights list of the San Antonio Commanders of the Alliance of American Football (AAF) on April 1, 2019.

=== Calgary Stampeders ===
After the AAF suspended football operations, Braverman signed with the Calgary Stampeders of the Canadian Football League (CFL) on April 17, 2019. He was released before the start of the season on June 9, 2019, and placed on the practice roster. He was released from the practice roster at the end of the season on November 11, 2019.

=== St. Louis BattleHawks ===
Braverman signed with the St. Louis BattleHawks of the XFL during mini-camp in December 2019. He was placed on injured reserve on January 8, 2020. He was waived from injured reserve on March 4, 2020.

=== Toronto Argonauts ===
Braverman signed with the Toronto Argonauts of the CFL on January 4, 2021. He played in just four games where he had 15 receptions for 152 yards, 16 punt returns for 63 yards, and 10 kickoff returns for 228 yards. He was released on April 18, 2022.

== See also ==
- List of select Jewish football players
