= Joel Smeenge =

American football player (born 1968)

No. 99
- Position: Defensive end

Personal information
- Born: April 1, 1968 (age 58); Holland, Michigan, U.S.
- Listed height: 6 ft 6 in (1.98 m)
- Listed weight: 262 lb (119 kg)

Career information
- High school: Hudsonville (Hudsonville, Michigan)
- College: Western Michigan
- NFL draft: 1990: 3rd round, 71st overall pick

Career history
- New Orleans Saints (1990–1994); Jacksonville Jaguars (1995–2000); Chicago Bears (2001)*
- * Offseason or practice squad member only

Career NFL statistics
- Tackles: 236
- Sacks: 35.5
- Interceptions: 1
- Stats at Pro Football Reference

Joel Andrew Smeenge (born April 1, 1968) is an American former professional football player who was a defensive end in the National Football League (NFL) for the New Orleans Saints and the Jacksonville Jaguars. He was selected by the Saints in the third round of the 1990 NFL draft. He played 11 seasons in the NFL from 1990 to 2000. He played college football at Western Michigan University. Smeenge attended Hudsonville High School along with other notable Hudsonvillian, Major League Baseball's John Vander Wal.

Herb Deromedi, head coach at Central Michigan, was quoted in saying, "in Joel you have one of the top defensive players we've ever seen in the Mid-American Conference. He ranks right up there with Jack Lambert and John Offerdahl."

Quick, tough and hard hitting, Smeenge was one of the nation's most impressive defensive ends in 1989. His 4.65 speed made him a dangerous pass rusher and explosive tackler. Smeenge was an All-MAC outside linebacker as a sophomore in 1987, and was selected as an all-conference defensive end the next two seasons. Smeenge led the conference with 20 tackles for a loss in 1988 and 18 in 1989.

Joel invested in some car dealerships and real estate developments which ultimately led to filing of both personal and business bankruptcies in 2010.
