= Skyy Moore =

American football player (born 2000)

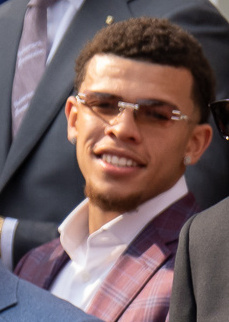
- Moore in 2023

No. 23 – Green Bay Packers
- Position: Wide receiver
- Roster status: Active

Personal information
- Born: September 10, 2000 (age 26); New Kensington, Pennsylvania, U.S.
- Listed height: 5 ft 10 in (1.78 m)
- Listed weight: 195 lb (88 kg)

Career information
- High school: Shady Side (Fox Chapel, Pennsylvania)
- College: Western Michigan (2019–2021)
- NFL draft: 2022: 2nd round, 54th overall pick

Career history
- Kansas City Chiefs (2022–2024); San Francisco 49ers (2025); Green Bay Packers (2026–present)

Awards and highlights
- 2× Super Bowl champion (LVII, LVIII); 2× First-team All-MAC (2019, 2021); Second-team All-MAC (2020)

Career NFL statistics as of Week 10, 2026
- Receptions: 55
- Receiving yards: 616
- Receiving touchdowns: 1
- Rushing yards: 58
- Return yards: 1,863
- Stats at Pro Football Reference

Skyy Edward Moore (born September 10, 2000) is an American professional football wide receiver for the Green Bay Packers of the National Football League (NFL). He played college football for the Western Michigan Broncos and was selected by the Kansas City Chiefs in the second round of the 2022 NFL draft.

== Early life ==
Moore began his high school years at Valley High School in New Kensington, Pennsylvania. Later, Moore finished at Shady Side Academy in Fox Chapel, Pennsylvania. He played quarterback and defensive back under Dave Havern while in high school. Moore committed to Western Michigan University to play college football.

== College career ==
Moore was converted into a wide receiver in college despite never playing the position before. As a true freshman in 2019, Moore started 12 of 13 games and had 53 receptions for 802 yards and three touchdowns. As a sophomore in 2020, Moore played in five games, recording 25 receptions for 388 yards and three touchdowns.

Moore returned as a starter in 2021. Against Northern Illinois, he tied a school record with four touchdown receptions. Moore declared for the 2022 NFL draft following the season.

== Professional career ==
Pre-draft measurables
| Height | Weight | Arm length | Hand span | Wingspan | 40-yard dash | 10-yard split | 20-yard split | 20-yard shuttle | Three-cone drill | Vertical jump | Broad jump | Bench press |
|---|---|---|---|---|---|---|---|---|---|---|---|---|
| 5 ft 9 5/8 in (1.77 m) | 195 lb (88 kg) | 31 in (0.79 m) | 10 1/4 in (0.26 m) | 6 ft 1 5/8 in (1.87 m) | 4.41 s | 1.46 s | 2.51 s | 4.32 s | 7.13 s | 34.5 in (0.88 m) | 10 ft 5 in (3.18 m) | 15 reps |
All values from NFL Combine/Pro Day

=== Kansas City Chiefs ===
==== 2022 season ====
The Kansas City Chiefs selected Moore in the second round (54th overall) of the 2022 NFL draft.

Moore appeared in 16 games, of which he started three, as a rookie. He finished with 22 receptions for 250 yards. In the final minute of the AFC Championship Game against the Cincinnati Bengals, Moore returned a punt return 29 yards, just three yards shy of midfield, which helped set up Harrison Butker's game-winning 45-yard field goal to secure a 23–20 victory and propel the Chiefs to Super Bowl LVII. In Super Bowl LVII, Moore scored his first career touchdown in the fourth quarter of the Chiefs' 38–35 victory over the Philadelphia Eagles.

==== 2023 season ====
Moore scored his first career regular season touchdown in the Chiefs' week 2 game against the Jacksonville Jaguars on a 9-yard catch. Moore was placed on injured reserve on December 18, 2023. He finished the regular season with 21 receptions for 244 yards and a touchdown.

Moore was designated for return on January 17, 2024, and activated on February 7 in time for Super Bowl LVIII. Moore did not play in the Super Bowl, but the Chiefs still won 25–22 in overtime over the San Francisco 49ers.

==== 2024 season ====
On October 24, 2024, the Chiefs placed Moore on injured reserve due to a core muscle injury.

=== San Francisco 49ers ===
On August 21, 2025, the Chiefs traded Moore to the San Francisco 49ers with a 2027 seventh-round draft pick in exchange for a 2027 sixth-round draft pick. Moore played in all 17 games for San Francisco during the regular season, recording five receptions for 87 yards, two carries for 11 yards, and 1,198 combined return yards.

=== Green Bay Packers ===
Moore signed a one-year, $2.5 million contract with the Green Bay Packers on March 13, 2026.

== Career statistics ==
Legend
| | Won the Super Bowl |
| **Bold** | Career high |

=== NFL ===
==== Regular season ====
| Year | Team | Games | | Receiving | | | | | Rushing | | | | | Returning | | | | | Fumbles | |
| Year | Team | GP | GS | Rec | Yds | Avg | Lng | TD | Att | Yds | Avg | Lng | TD | Ret | Yds | Avg | Lng | TD | Fum | Lost |
|---|---|---|---|---|---|---|---|---|---|---|---|---|---|---|---|---|---|---|---|---|
| 2022 | KC | 16 | 3 | **22** | **250** | 11.4 | 30 | 0 | **3** | **24** | **8.0** | **12** | 0 | 17 | 136 | 8.0 | 23 | 0 | **3** | **3** |
| 2023 | KC | 14 | 8 | 21 | 244 | 11.6 | **54** | **1** | **3** | 23 | 7.7 | 11 | 0 | 0 | 0 | 0.0 | 0 | 0 | 0 | 0 |
| 2024 | KC | 6 | 0 | 0 | 0 | 0.0 | 0 | 0 | 0 | 0 | 0.0 | 0 | 0 | 2 | 43 | 21.5 | 28 | 0 | 0 | 0 |
| 2025 | SF | 17 | 0 | 5 | 87 | **17.4** | 23 | 0 | 2 | 11 | 5.5 | 10 | 0 | **58** | **1,198** | 20.7 | **98** | 0 | 1 | 0 |
| 2026 | GNB | 5 | 0 | 7 | 35 | 5.0 | 12 | 0 | 0 | 0 | 0.0 | 0 | 0 | 19 | 430 | **22.6** | 63 | 0 | 1 | 0 |
| Career | | 56 | 11 | 55 | 616 | 11.2 | 54 | 1 | 8 | 58 | 7.3 | 12 | 0 | 96 | 1,807 | 18.8 | 98 | 0 | 5 | 3 |

==== Postseason ====
| Year | Team | Games | | Receiving | | | | | Rushing | | | | | Returning | | | | | Fumbles | |
| Year | Team | GP | GS | Rec | Yds | Avg | Lng | TD | Att | Yds | Avg | Lng | TD | Ret | Yds | Avg | Lng | TD | Fum | Lost |
|---|---|---|---|---|---|---|---|---|---|---|---|---|---|---|---|---|---|---|---|---|
| 2022 | KC | 3 | 0 | **5** | **17** | **3.4** | **8** | **1** | **2** | **7** | **3.5** | **4** | 0 | 3 | 47 | **15.7** | **29** | 0 | 0 | 0 |
| 2023 | KC | 0 | 0 | Did not play due to injury | | | | | | | | | | | | | | | | |
| 2025 | SF | 2 | 0 | 0 | 0 | 0.0 | 0 | 0 | 1 | 3 | 3.0 | 3 | 0 | **8** | **106** | 13.3 | 27 | 0 | **1** | 0 |
| Career | | 5 | 0 | 5 | 17 | 3.4 | 8 | 1 | 3 | 10 | 3.3 | 4 | 0 | 11 | 153 | 13.9 | 29 | 0 | 1 | 0 |

=== College ===
| Year | Team | GP | Receiving | | | | Rushing | | | | Scrimmage | | | |
| Year | Team | GP | Rec | Yds | Avg | TD | Att | Yds | Avg | TD | Plays | Yds | Avg. | TD |
|---|---|---|---|---|---|---|---|---|---|---|---|---|---|---|
| 2019 | Western Michigan | 13 | 51 | 802 | **15.7** | 3 | **1** | 2 | 2.0 | **1** | 52 | 804 | **15.5** | 4 |
| 2020 | Western Michigan | 5 | 25 | 388 | 15.5 | 3 | **1** | 0 | 0.0 | 0 | 26 | 388 | 14.9 | 3 |
| 2021 | Western Michigan | 12 | **95** | **1,292** | 13.6 | **10** | **1** | **10** | **10.0** | 0 | **96** | **1,302** | 13.6 | **10** |
| Career | | 30 | 171 | 2,482 | 14.5 | 16 | 3 | 12 | 4.0 | 1 | 174 | 2,494 | 14.3 | 17 |
