= 2019 Akron Zips football team =

American college football season

2019 Akron Zips football
- Conference: Mid-American Conference
- East Division
- Record: 0–12 (0–8 MAC)
- Head coach: Tom Arth (1st season)
- Offensive coordinator: Tommy Zagorski (1st season)
- Offensive scheme: Pro-style
- Defensive coordinator: Matt Feeney (1st season)
- Base defense: 3–4
- Home stadium: InfoCision Stadium–Summa Field

2019 Mid-American Conference football standings
	Conf.			Overall
Team	W		L	W		L
East Division
Miami (OH) x$	6	–	2	8	–	6
Ohio	5	–	3	7	–	6
Buffalo	5	–	3	8	–	5
Kent State	5	–	3	7	–	6
Bowling Green	2	–	6	3	–	9
Akron	0	–	8	0	–	12
West Division
Central Michigan x	6	–	2	8	–	6
Western Michigan	5	–	3	7	–	6
Ball State	4	–	4	5	–	7
Northern Illinois	4	–	4	5	–	7
Toledo	3	–	5	6	–	6
Eastern Michigan	3	–	5	6	–	7
Championship: Miami 26, Central Michigan 21
$ – Conference champion; x – Division champion/co-champions

The 2019 Akron Zips football team represented the University of Akron during the 2019 NCAA Division I FBS football season. The Zips were led by first-year head coach Tom Arth and played their home games at InfoCision Stadium in Akron, Ohio. They competed as members of the East Division of the Mid-American Conference (MAC).

The 2019 Zips lost every single game on their schedule, finished with an 0–12 overall record and an 0–8 record in MAC play, and were outscored by their opponents by a total of 435 to 126. They finished in last place in the conference's East Division. CBS Sports rated Akron last, at 130th, in their season's-end ranking of all 130 FBS teams. The Zips were the only Division I FBS team to go winless in the 2019 season. They were also the last team to be winless in a full season until Kent State in 2024.

== Preseason ==
=== Coaching changes ===
Following the firing of seven-year head coach Terry Bowden at the end of the 2018 season, Akron announced the hiring of Tom Arth on December 14, 2018. Arth had spent the previous two seasons as the head coach at the University of Tennessee at Chattanooga, leading them to records of 3–8 and 6–5 in 2017 and 2018, respectively. Before Chattanooga, he was the head coach at John Carroll University, where he led the team to an upset victory over No. 1 Mount Union to claim an Ohio Athletic Conference title in 2016 and was named D3football.com Coach of the Year.

Tom Arth announced the members of his coaching staff in January and March 2019. Among them were defensive coordinator Matt Feeney and offensive coordinator Tommy Zagorski, who both served in the same roles on Arth's staff at Chattanooga.

=== MAC media poll ===
The MAC released their preseason media poll on July 23, 2019, with the Zips predicted to finish in fifth place in the East Division.

== Schedule ==
Akron's non-conference slate consisted of home games against UAB of Conference USA and Troy of the Sun Belt Conference, and road games against Illinois of the Big Ten Conference and UMass, a football independent.

In Mid-American Conference play, the Zips hosted Kent State, Buffalo, Eastern Michigan, and Ohio, and traveled to Central Michigan, Northern Illinois, Bowling Green, and Miami. They did not play West Division members Ball State, Toledo, or Western Michigan.

Date	Time	Opponent	Site	TV	Result	Attendance
August 31	Noon	at Illinois*	Memorial Stadium; Champaign, IL	BTN	L 3–42	30,654
September 7	Noon	UAB*	InfoCision Stadium; Akron, OH	CBSSN	L 20–31	18,972
September 14	3:00 p.m.	at Central Michigan	Kelly/Shorts Stadium; Mount Pleasant, MI	ESPN+	L 24–45	18,641
September 21	3:00 p.m.	Troy*	InfoCision Stadium; Akron, OH	ESPN+	L 7–35	16,954
September 28	3:30 p.m.	at UMass*	Warren McGuirk Alumni Stadium; Hadley, MA	FloSports	L 29–37	7,284
October 12	3:30 p.m.	Kent State^{†}	InfoCision Stadium; Akron, OH (Wagon Wheel)	ESPN3	L 3–26	22,692
October 19	3:00 p.m.	Buffalo	InfoCision Stadium; Akron, OH	ESPN3	L 0–21	16,909
October 26	3:30 p.m.	at Northern Illinois	Huskie Stadium; DeKalb, IL	ESPN3	L 0–49	9,027
November 2	2:00 p.m.	at Bowling Green	Doyt Perry Stadium; Bowling Green, OH	ESPN+	L 6–35	12,113
November 12	6:00 p.m.	Eastern Michigan	InfoCision Stadium; Akron, OH	ESPNews	L 14–42	10,811
November 20	7:30 p.m.	at Miami (OH)	Yager Stadium; Oxford, OH	ESPNU	L 17–20	22,921
November 26	6:00 p.m.	Ohio	InfoCision Stadium; Akron, OH	ESPN+	L 3–52	21,414
*Non-conference game; ^{†}Homecoming; Rankings from AP Poll and CFP Rankings after November 5 released prior to game; All times are in Eastern time

== Personnel ==
=== Coaching staff ===
- Tom Arth - Head coach
- Matt Feeney – Defensive Coordinator / Inside Linebackers
- Tommy Zagorski – Offensive coordinator / Offensive Line
- Brian Cochran – Defensive Line
- Chris Cook – Tight ends / Offensive Tackles
- Jonathan Cooley – Defensive Backs / Corners & Nickels
- Jayden Everett – Running Backs
- Shelton Felton – Outside Linebackers / Defensive Ends
- Bryan Gasser – Pass Game Coordinator / Wide Receivers
- Chris Hurd – Special Teams / Fullbacks / Halfbacks
- Oscar Rodriguez – Secondary / Safeties

== Game summaries ==
=== At Illinois ===
	1	2	3	4	Total
Zips	3	0	0	0	3
Fighting Illini	14	14	14	0	42

Statistics	AKR	ILL
First downs	16	22
Total yards	192	401
Rushing yards	64	207
Passing yards	128	194
Turnovers	2	0
Time of possession	31:37	28:23

Team	Category	Player	Statistics
Akron	Passing	Kato Nelson	10/24, 122 yards, INT
Akron	Rushing	Deltron Sands	14 rushes, 47 yards
Akron	Receiving	Nate Stewart	5 receptions, 79 yards
Illinois	Passing	Brandon Peters	14/23, 163 yards, 3 TD
Illinois	Rushing	Mike Epstein	8 rushes, 45 yards
Illinois	Receiving	Ricky Smalling	4 receptions, 54 yards

=== UAB ===
	1	2	3	4	Total
Blazers	7	10	14	0	31
Zips	6	0	0	14	20

Statistics	UAB	AKR
First downs	15	16
Total yards	402	393
Rushing yards	83	34
Passing yards	319	359
Turnovers	1	2
Time of possession	27:37	32:23

Team	Category	Player	Statistics
UAB	Passing	Tyler Johnston III	15/24, 319 yards, 4 TD, INT
UAB	Rushing	Spencer Brown	16 rushes, 35 yards
UAB	Receiving	Austin Watkins Jr.	3 receptions, 95 yards, 2 TD
Akron	Passing	Kato Nelson	25/44, 359 yards, 2 TD
Akron	Rushing	Kato Nelson	13 rushes, 31 yards
Akron	Receiving	Dustin Burkhart	8 receptions, 217 yards

=== At Central Michigan ===
	1	2	3	4	Total
Zips	0	10	0	14	24
Chippewas	3	24	3	15	45

Statistics	AKR	CMU
First downs	16	21
Total yards	326	533
Rushing yards	42	189
Passing yards	282	344
Turnovers	2	1
Time of possession	31:10	28:50

Team	Category	Player	Statistics
Akron	Passing	Kato Nelson	26/42, 241 yards, 3 TD, INT
Akron	Rushing	Kato Nelson	16 rushes, 28 yards
Akron	Receiving	Nate Stewart	5 receptions, 78 yards, TD
Central Michigan	Passing	David Moore	20/31, 316 yards, 2 TD
Central Michigan	Rushing	Kobe Lewis	27 rushes, 146 yards, 3 TD
Central Michigan	Receiving	Kalil Pimpleton	7 receptions, 116 yards, TD

=== Troy ===
	1	2	3	4	Total
Trojans	7	14	14	0	35
Zips	7	0	0	0	7

Statistics	TROY	AKR
First downs	32	10
Total yards	485	242
Rushing yards	270	39
Passing yards	215	203
Turnovers	1	2
Time of possession	41:17	18:43

Team	Category	Player	Statistics
Troy	Passing	Kaleb Barker	27/37, 214 yards, 3 TD, INT
Troy	Rushing	D. K. Billingsley	22 rushes, 100 yards, TD
Troy	Receiving	Luke Whittemore	7 receptions, 64 yards
Akron	Passing	Kato Nelson	15/29, 200 yards, TD
Akron	Rushing	Brandon Lee	6 rushes, 38 yards
Akron	Receiving	Nate Stewart	4 receptions, 89 yards

=== At UMass ===
	1	2	3	4	Total
Zips	7	7	7	8	29
Minutemen	7	13	14	3	37

Statistics	AKR	MASS
First downs	22	24
Total yards	406	433
Rushing yards	71	220
Passing yards	335	213
Turnovers	3	1
Time of possession	29:02	30:58

Team	Category	Player	Statistics
Akron	Passing	Zach Gibson	12/16, 173 yards, TD
Akron	Rushing	Michiah Burton	8 rushes, 25 yards, TD
Akron	Receiving	Boogie Knight	5 receptions, 100 yards
UMass	Passing	Michael Curtis	17/31, 173 yards, 2 TD, INT
UMass	Rushing	Bilal Ally	15 rushes, 97 yards
UMass	Receiving	Samuel Emilus	6 receptions, 70 yards, TD

=== Kent State ===
	1	2	3	4	Total
Golden Flashes	7	10	0	9	26
Zips	0	3	0	0	3

Statistics	KENT	AKR
First downs	24	19
Total yards	382	288
Rushing yards	233	95
Passing yards	149	202
Turnovers	0	1
Time of possession	29:34	30:26

Team	Category	Player	Statistics
Kent State	Passing	Dustin Crum	16/21, 149 yards, TD
Kent State	Rushing	Will Matthews	25 rushes, 126 yards, TD
Kent State	Receiving	Isaiah McKoy	7 receptions, 80 yards, TD
Akron	Passing	Kato Nelson	17/28, 202 yards
Akron	Rushing	Kato Nelson	14 rushes, 64 yards
Akron	Receiving	Nate Stewart	4 receptions, 71 yards

=== Buffalo ===
	1	2	3	4	Total
Bulls	7	0	7	7	21
Zips	0	0	0	0	0

Statistics	BUFF	AKR
First downs	16	11
Total yards	254	196
Rushing yards	189	3
Passing yards	65	193
Turnovers	1	4
Time of possession	34:37	25:23

Team	Category	Player	Statistics
Buffalo	Passing	Kyle Vantrease	14/23, 65 yards
Buffalo	Rushing	Jaret Patterson	17 rushes, 88 yards
Buffalo	Receiving	Daniel Lee	6 receptions, 30 yards
Akron	Passing	Zach Gibson	22/39, 193 yards, INT
Akron	Rushing	Decavilon Reese	8 rushes, 37 yards
Akron	Receiving	Julian Hicks	9 receptions, 51 yards

=== At Northern Illinois ===
	1	2	3	4	Total
Zips	0	0	0	0	0
Huskies	7	14	14	14	49

Statistics	AKR	NIU
First downs	7	21
Total yards	145	345
Rushing yards	94	274
Passing yards	51	71
Turnovers	3	1
Time of possession	20:35	39:25

Team	Category	Player	Statistics
Akron	Passing	Zach Gibson	4/15, 36 yards, INT
Akron	Rushing	Brandon Lee	10 rushes, 76 yards
Akron	Receiving	Julian Hicks	3 receptions, 22 yards
Northern Illinois	Passing	Marcus Childers	7/9, 71 yards, 3 TD
Northern Illinois	Rushing	Tre Harbison	31 rushes, 158 yards, 2 TD
Northern Illinois	Receiving	Mitchell Brinkman	2 receptions, 36 yards, TD

=== At Bowling Green ===
	1	2	3	4	Total
Zips	6	0	0	0	6
Falcons	7	14	7	7	35

Statistics	AKR	BGSU
First downs	7	17
Total yards	100	276
Rushing yards	29	156
Passing yards	71	120
Turnovers	4	1
Time of possession	22:58	37:02

Team	Category	Player	Statistics
Akron	Passing	Kato Nelson	9/24, 60 yards, 2 INT
Akron	Rushing	Peter Hayes-Patrick	4 rushes, 23 yards
Akron	Receiving	Nate Stewart	3 receptions, 26 yards
Bowling Green	Passing	Grant Loy	12/20, 113 yards, TD
Bowling Green	Rushing	Andrew Clair	29 rushes, 86 yards, 2 TD
Bowling Green	Receiving	Quintin Morris	4 receptions, 53 yards, TD

=== Eastern Michigan ===
	1	2	3	4	Total
Eagles	7	14	14	7	42
Zips	0	0	7	7	14

Statistics	EMU	AKR
First downs	25	14
Total yards	498	342
Rushing yards	252	54
Passing yards	246	288
Turnovers	0	1
Time of possession	33:45	26:15

Team	Category	Player	Statistics
Eastern Michigan	Passing	Mike Glass III	20/25, 246 yards
Eastern Michigan	Rushing	Shaq Vann	28 rushes, 142 yards, 4 TD
Eastern Michigan	Receiving	Matthew Sexton	4 receptions, 76 yards
Akron	Passing	Kato Nelson	20/33, 288 yards, 2 TD, INT
Akron	Rushing	Peter Hayes-Patrick	13 rushes, 43 yards
Akron	Receiving	Boogie Knight	6 receptions, 121 yards

=== At Miami (OH) ===
	1	2	3	4	Total
Zips	0	3	7	7	17
RedHawks	3	14	3	0	20

Statistics	AKR	MOH
First downs	11	19
Total yards	202	355
Rushing yards	5	238
Passing yards	197	117
Turnovers	0	2
Time of possession	26:54	33:06

Team	Category	Player	Statistics
Akron	Passing	Kato Nelson	15/25, 197 yards, TD
Akron	Rushing	Peter Hayes-Patrick	6 rushes, 17 yards
Akron	Receiving	Nate Stewart	3 receptions, 66 yards
Miami	Passing	Brett Gabbert	10/21, 117 yards, 2 INT
Miami	Rushing	Jaylon Bester	21 rushes, 128 yards, TD
Miami	Receiving	Jack Sorenson	3 receptions, 46 yards

=== Ohio ===
	1	2	3	4	Total
Bobcats	14	17	7	14	52
Zips	3	0	0	0	3

Statistics	OHIO	AKR
First downs	25	7
Total yards	603	74
Rushing yards	251	41
Passing yards	352	33
Turnovers	2	2
Time of possession	37:34	22:26

Team	Category	Player	Statistics
Ohio	Passing	Nathan Rourke	20/28, 308 yards, 4 TD
Ohio	Rushing	De'Montre Tuggle	9 rushes, 78 yards
Ohio	Receiving	Tyler Walton	5 receptions, 82 yards
Akron	Passing	Zach Gibson	3/11, 23 yards, INT
Akron	Rushing	Peter Hayes-Patrick	14 rushes, 42 yards
Akron	Receiving	Boogie Knight	2 receptions, 22 yards
