= 2019 Miami RedHawks football team =

American college football season

2019 Miami RedHawks football

MAC champion MAC East Division champion

MAC Championship Game, W 26–21 vs. Central Michigan

LendingTree Bowl, L 17–27 vs. Louisiana
- Conference: Mid-American Conference
- East Division
- Record: 8–6 (6–2 MAC)
- Head coach: Chuck Martin (6th season)
- Co-offensive coordinators: George Barnett (6th season); Eric Koehler (6th season)
- Offensive scheme: Multiple
- Co-defensive coordinators: John Hauser (4th season); Spence Nowinsky (2nd season)
- Base defense: 4–3
- Home stadium: Yager Stadium

Uniform
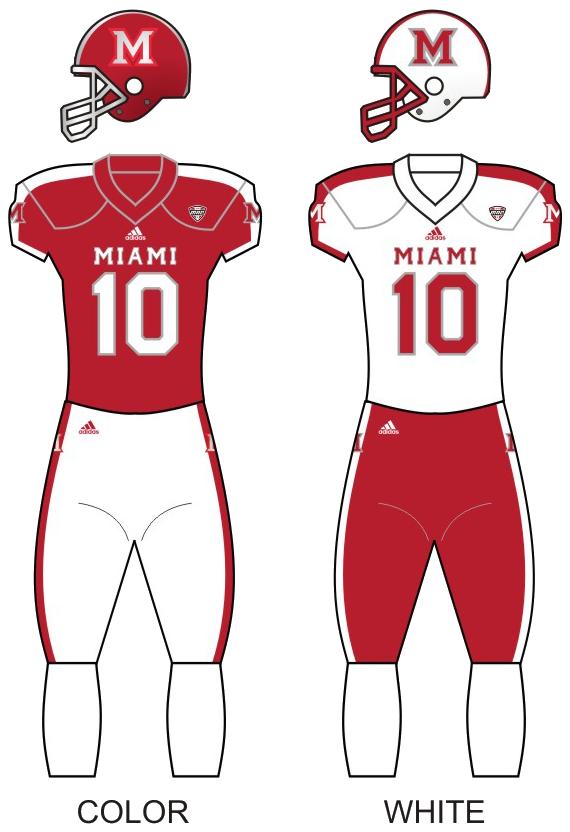

2019 Mid-American Conference football standings
	Conf.			Overall
Team	W		L	W		L
East Division
Miami (OH) x$	6	–	2	8	–	6
Ohio	5	–	3	7	–	6
Buffalo	5	–	3	8	–	5
Kent State	5	–	3	7	–	6
Bowling Green	2	–	6	3	–	9
Akron	0	–	8	0	–	12
West Division
Central Michigan x	6	–	2	8	–	6
Western Michigan	5	–	3	7	–	6
Ball State	4	–	4	5	–	7
Northern Illinois	4	–	4	5	–	7
Toledo	3	–	5	6	–	6
Eastern Michigan	3	–	5	6	–	7
Championship: Miami 26, Central Michigan 21
$ – Conference champion; x – Division champion/co-champions

The 2019 Miami RedHawks football team represented Miami University in the 2019 NCAA Division I FBS football season. They were led by sixth year head coach Chuck Martin and played their home games at Yager Stadium in Oxford, Ohio, as members of the East Division of the Mid-American Conference.

== Preseason ==
=== MAC media poll ===
The MAC released their preseason media poll on July 23, 2019, with the RedHawks predicted to finish in second place in the East Division.

== Schedule ==
Date	Time	Opponent	Site	TV	Result	Attendance
August 31	6:30 p.m.	at No. 20 Iowa*	Kinnick Stadium; Iowa City, IA	FS1	L 14–38	69,250
September 7	2:30 p.m.	Tennessee Tech*^{†}	Yager Stadium; Oxford, OH	ESPN+	W 48–17	16,022
September 14	12:00 p.m.	at Cincinnati*	Nippert Stadium; Cincinnati, OH (Victory Bell)	ESPNU	L 13–35	35,526
September 21	3:30 p.m.	at No. 6 Ohio State*	Ohio Stadium; Columbus, OH	BTN	L 5–76	103,190
September 28	12:00 p.m.	Buffalo	Yager Stadium; Oxford, OH	ESPNU	W 34–20	18,419
October 12	12:00 p.m.	at Western Michigan	Waldo Stadium; Kalamazoo, MI	ESPNU	L 16–38	21,702
October 19	2:30 p.m.	Northern Illinois	Yager Stadium; Oxford, OH	ESPN+	W 27–24	11,710
October 26	3:30 p.m.	at Kent State	Dix Stadium; Kent, OH	ESPN+	W 23–16	8,455
November 6	8:00 p.m.	at Ohio	Peden Stadium; Athens, OH (Battle of the Bricks)	ESPN2	W 24–21	20,589
November 13	8:00 p.m.	Bowling Green	Yager Stadium; Oxford, OH	ESPNU	W 44–3	19,897
November 20	7:30 p.m.	Akron	Yager Stadium; Oxford, OH	ESPNU	W 20–17	22,921
November 29	12:00 p.m.	at Ball State	Scheumann Stadium; Muncie, IN	CBSSN	L 27–41	7,155
December 7	12:00 p.m.	vs. Central Michigan	Ford Field; Detroit, MI (MAC Championship Game)	ESPN2	W 26–21	22,427
January 6, 2020	7:30 p.m.	vs. Louisiana*	Ladd-Peebles Stadium; Mobile, AL (LendingTree Bowl)	ESPN	L 17–27	29,212
*Non-conference game; ^{†}Homecoming; Rankings from AP Poll and CFP Rankings after November 5 released prior to game; All times are in Eastern time

== Personnel ==
=== Coaching staff ===
Name	Position
Chuck Martin	Head coach
Eric Koehler	Co-offensive coordinator/quarterbacks coach
George Barnett	Co-offensive coordinator/offensive line coach
Spence Nowinsky	Co-defensive coordinator/ Linebackers coach
John Hauser	Co-defensive coordinator/Cornerbacks coach
Pat Welsh	Tight ends coach
E.J. Whitlow	Defensive line coach
Israel Woolfork	Wide receivers coach
Joe Palcic	Special teams coach
Bill Brechin	Safeties
Lamar Conard	Running backs
Matt Yoches	Director of football operations
Trey Neyer	Director of player personnel

== Game summaries ==
=== At Iowa ===
	1	2	3	4	Total
RedHawks	0	7	0	7	14
No. 20 Hawkeyes	3	7	14	14	38

=== Tennessee Tech ===
	1	2	3	4	Total
Golden Eagles	3	0	0	14	17
RedHawks	10	31	0	7	48

=== At Cincinnati ===
	1	2	3	4	Total
RedHawks	10	0	3	0	13
Bearcats	0	14	21	0	35

=== At Ohio State ===
	1	2	3	4	Total
RedHawks	5	0	0	0	5
No. 6 Buckeyes	7	42	14	13	76

=== Buffalo ===
	1	2	3	4	Total
Bulls	7	7	0	6	20
RedHawks	0	13	21	0	34

=== At Western Michigan ===
	1	2	3	4	Total
RedHawks	6	0	3	7	16
Broncos	0	21	0	17	38

=== Northern Illinois ===
	1	2	3	4	Total
Huskies	3	7	7	7	24
RedHawks	0	7	14	6	27

=== At Kent State ===
	1	2	3	4	Total
RedHawks	6	3	7	7	23
Golden Flashes	0	6	0	10	16

=== At Ohio ===
	1	2	3	4	Total
RedHawks	0	7	7	10	24
Bobcats	0	7	0	14	21

=== Bowling Green ===
	1	2	3	4	Total
Falcons	3	0	0	0	3
RedHawks	10	27	7	0	44

=== Akron ===
	1	2	3	4	Total
Zips	0	3	7	7	17
RedHawks	3	14	3	0	20

=== At Ball State ===
	1	2	3	4	Total
RedHawks	7	20	0	0	27
Cardinals	7	7	6	21	41

=== MAC Championship Game ===
	1	2	3	4	Total
RedHawks	7	3	7	9	26
Chippewas	0	14	0	7	21

=== Vs. Louisiana (LendingTree Bowl) ===
	1	2	3	4	Total
RedHawks	0	7	3	7	17
Ragin' Cajuns	0	10	14	3	27

== Players drafted into the NFL ==
Round	Pick	Player	Position	NFL Club
7	248	Sam Sloman	K	Los Angeles Rams
