= 2019 Ball State Cardinals football team =

American college football season

2019 Ball State Cardinals football
- Conference: Mid-American Conference
- West Division
- Record: 5–7 (4–4 MAC)
- Head coach: Mike Neu (4th season)
- Offensive coordinator: Joey Lynch (6th season)
- Offensive scheme: Spread
- Defensive coordinator: David Elson (3rd season)
- Co-defensive coordinator: Tyler Stockton (1st season)
- Base defense: 3–4
- Home stadium: Scheumann Stadium

Uniform
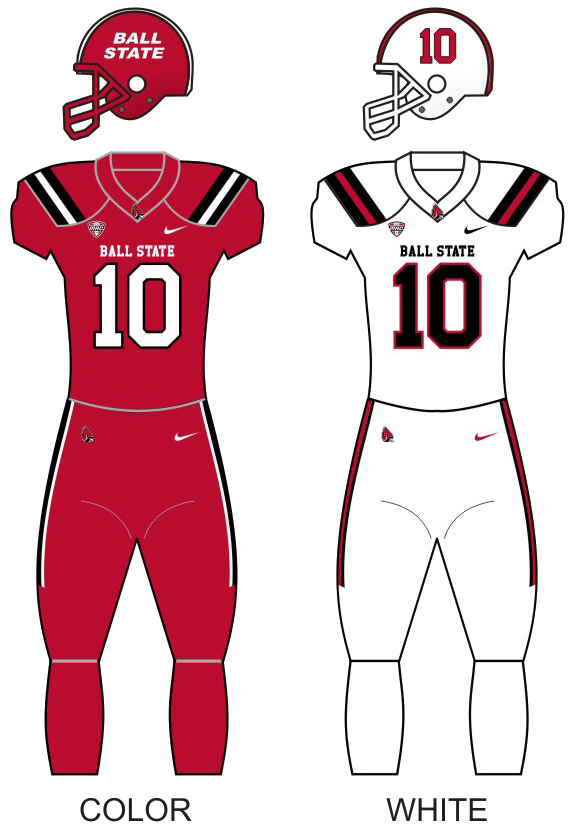

2019 Mid-American Conference football standings
	Conf.			Overall
Team	W		L	W		L
East Division
Miami (OH) x$	6	–	2	8	–	6
Ohio	5	–	3	7	–	6
Buffalo	5	–	3	8	–	5
Kent State	5	–	3	7	–	6
Bowling Green	2	–	6	3	–	9
Akron	0	–	8	0	–	12
West Division
Central Michigan x	6	–	2	8	–	6
Western Michigan	5	–	3	7	–	6
Ball State	4	–	4	5	–	7
Northern Illinois	4	–	4	5	–	7
Toledo	3	–	5	6	–	6
Eastern Michigan	3	–	5	6	–	7
Championship: Miami 26, Central Michigan 21
$ – Conference champion; x – Division champion/co-champions

The 2019 Ball State Cardinals football team represented Ball State University during the 2019 NCAA Division I FBS football season. The Cardinals were led by fourth-year head coach Mike Neu and played their home games at Scheumann Stadium in Muncie, Indiana. They competed as members of the West Division of the Mid-American Conference.

== Preseason ==
=== MAC media poll ===
The MAC released their preseason media poll on July 23, 2019, with the Cardinals predicted to finish in fifth place in the West Division.

== Schedule ==
Date	Time	Opponent	Site	TV	Result	Attendance
August 31	12:00 p.m.	vs. Indiana*	Lucas Oil Stadium; Indianapolis, IN	CBSSN	L 24–34	21,437
September 7	2:00 p.m.	Fordham*	Scheumann Stadium; Muncie, IN	ESPN3	W 57–29	10,123
September 14	2:00 p.m.	Florida Atlantic*	Scheumann Stadium; Muncie, IN	ESPN+	L 31–41	14,333
September 21	7:00 p.m.	at NC State*	Carter–Finley Stadium; Raleigh, NC	ESPNU	L 23–34	57,702
October 5	3:30 p.m.	at Northern Illinois	Huskie Stadium; DeKalb, IL (Bronze Stalk Trophy)	ESPN3	W 27–20	10,365
October 12	2:00 p.m.	at Eastern Michigan	Rynearson Stadium; Ypsilanti, MI	ESPN+	W 29–23	17,852
October 19	2:00 p.m.	Toledo^{†}	Scheumann Stadium; Muncie, IN	ESPN+	W 52–14	15,113
October 26	2:00 p.m.	Ohio	Scheumann Stadium; Muncie, IN	ESPN+	L 21–34	5,572
November 5	8:00 p.m.	at Western Michigan	Waldo Stadium; Kalamazoo, MI	ESPN2	L 31–35	11,314
November 16	3:30 p.m.	Central Michigan	Scheumann Stadium; Muncie, IN	CBSSN	L 44–45	7,249
November 23	12:00 p.m.	at Kent State	Dix Stadium; Kent, OH	ESPN+	L 38–41	8,825
November 29	12:00 p.m.	Miami (OH)	Scheumann Stadium; Muncie, IN	CBSSN	W 41–27	7,155
*Non-conference game; ^{†}Homecoming; All times are in Eastern time

== Personnel ==
=== Coaching staff ===
Name	Position
Mike Neu	Head coach
Byron Ellis	Chief of Staff
Joey Lynch	Offensive coordinator/quarterbacks coach
David Elson	Defensive coordinator
Patrick Dougherty	Special teams coordinator/tight ends coach
Tyler Stockton	Co-defensive coordinator/inside linebackers Coach
Kevin Lynch	Running backs coach
Alex Bailey	Wide receivers coach
Colin Johnson	Offensive Line
Keith McKenzie	Defensive line coach
	Defensive Backs /passing game coordinator
Cory Connolly	Outside linebackers coach

== Game summaries ==
=== Vs. Indiana ===
	1	2	3	4	Total
Cardinals	3	7	7	7	24
Hoosiers	10	6	7	11	34

=== Fordham ===
	1	2	3	4	Total
Rams	14	0	15	0	29
Cardinals	14	14	22	7	57

=== Florida Atlantic ===
	1	2	3	4	Total
Owls	7	14	13	7	41
Cardinals	14	3	7	7	31

=== At NC State ===
	1	2	3	4	Total
Cardinals	7	0	6	10	23
Wolfpack	6	14	7	7	34

=== At Northern Illinois ===
	1	2	3	4	Total
Cardinals	0	3	14	10	27
Huskies	14	3	0	3	20

=== At Eastern Michigan ===
	1	2	3	4	Total
Cardinals	0	14	7	8	29
Eagles	7	10	6	0	23

=== Toledo ===
	1	2	3	4	Total
Rockets	0	0	7	7	14
Cardinals	17	21	14	0	52

=== Ohio ===
	1	2	3	4	Total
Bobcats	7	6	14	7	34
Cardinals	7	0	7	7	21

=== At Western Michigan ===
	1	2	3	4	Total
Cardinals	7	3	7	14	31
Broncos	7	14	0	14	35

=== Central Michigan ===
	1	2	3	4	Total
Chippewas	3	8	20	14	45
Cardinals	3	24	14	3	44

=== At Kent State ===
	1	2	3	4	Total
Cardinals	7	17	0	14	38
Golden Flashes	7	14	10	10	41

=== Miami (OH) ===
	1	2	3	4	Total
RedHawks	7	20	0	0	27
Cardinals	7	7	6	21	41

== Players drafted into the NFL ==
Round	Pick	Player	Position	NFL Club
5	149	Danny Pinter	OG	Indianapolis Colts
