= Tommy Zagorski =

American football player and coach (born 1984)

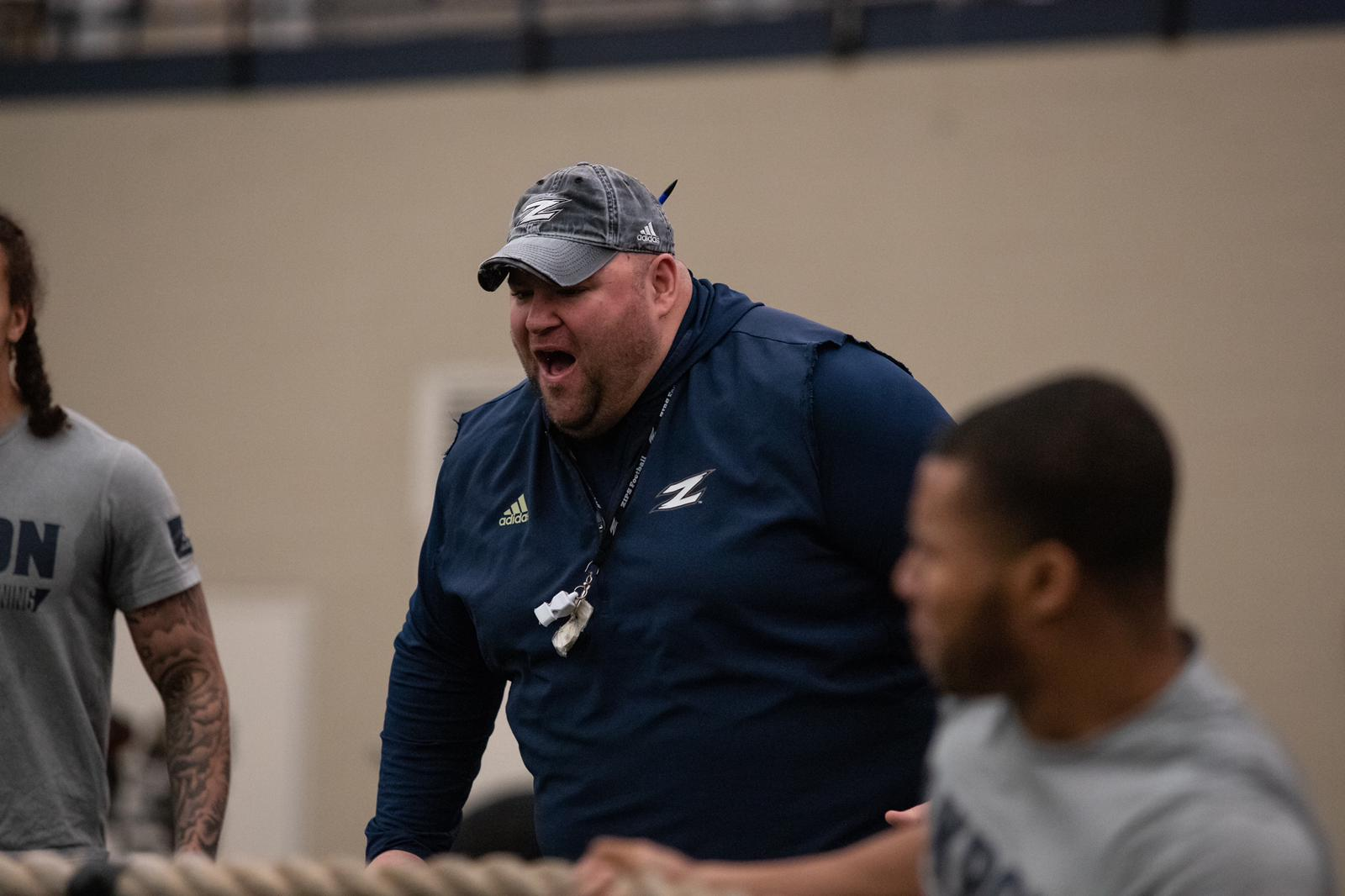
- Zagorski in 2020

Biographical details
- Born: October 19, 1984 (age 42); Newburgh Heights, Ohio, U.S.

Playing career
- 2004–2007: Case Western Reserve
- Position: Offensive lineman

Coaching career (HC unless noted)
- 2008–2009: John Carroll (GA)
- 2010–2012: John Carroll (ST/OL)
- 2013–2014: John Carroll (OC/OL)
- 2015: Tennessee (OQC)
- 2016–2017: Eastern Kentucky (AHC/OT/TE)
- 2018: Eastern Kentucky (AHC/OC/OT/TE)
- 2019–2021: Akron (OC/OL)
- 2022: Gilmour Academy (OH)
- 2023: Otterbein

Head coaching record
- Overall: 0–10 (college); 9–2 (high school)

Thomas Zagorski (born October 19, 1984) is an American football coach and former player. He was the head football coach at Otterbein University. He was the offensive coordinator and offensive line coach at the University of Akron.

== Playing career ==
Born and raised in Cleveland, Zagorski attended Benedictine High School and twice won the school's Joe Rufus Spirit Award. He helped the Bengals to a Regional Championship and State Runner-up finish his senior year while earning All-County, All-District and All-State honors as a team captain. He was the recipient of Mr. Benedictine, which is the highest honor any student can receive at the school.

Zagorski played offensive line and defensive line for the Case Western Reserve Spartans from 2004 through 2007, while completing his degree in sociology. He was a four-year letterwinner, and was also awarded All-Region and All-Conference (University Athletic Association).

== Coaching career ==
=== John Carroll ===
Following his playing career, Zagorski joined the coaching staff at John Carroll. He started as a graduate assistant, working with the offensive line while completing his Master's degree in school counciling from 2008 to 2010. He then served as the special teams coordinator and offensive line and tight ends coach from 2011 to 2012. When offensive coordinator Tom Arth was promoted to Head Coach prior to the 2013 season, he promoted Zagorski to offensive coordinator. Zagorski continued to coach the offensive line, while coordinating the offense in 2013 and 2014.

=== Tennessee ===
In 2015, Zagorski made a jump to NCAA Division I. He joined Butch Jones's staff at Tennessee as an offensive quality control assistant. In this role, he was an assistant offensive line coach. The Vols went on to win the Outback Bowl.

=== Eastern Kentucky ===
From 2016 to 2018, Zagorski was an assistant coach at Eastern Kentucky. He joined the staff as offensive tackles and tight ends coach. In April 2017, Zagorski added the Assistant Head Coach title. He started the 2018 season the same way, until Head coach Mark Elder then promoted Zagorski to offensive coordinator on October 21, 2018. He served as the offensive coordinator for the final four games of the season, and the offense saw immediate improvement.

=== Akron ===
Zagorski originally rejoined Tom Arth at Chattanooga prior to the 2019 season, but shortly thereafter, Arth was named the new head coach at Akron. Zagorski followed Arth to Akron, and was the offensive coordinator and offensive line coach. The entire staff was dismissed following the 2021 season.

=== Gilmour Academy ===
In May 2022, Zagorski was announced as the new head coach at Gilmour Academy High School in Gates Mills, Ohio, a suburb of Cleveland.

=== Otterbein ===
On January 31, 2023, Zagorski was announced as the new head coach of the Otterbein Cardinals football team.

Zagorski resigned on July 12, 2024, due to health concerns.

== Head coaching record ==
=== College ===
Year	Team	Overall	Conference	Standing	Bowl/playoffs
Otterbein Cardinals (Ohio Athletic Conference) (2023)
2023	Otterbein	0–10	0–9	10th	
Otterbein:		0–10	0–9		
Total:		0–10			

=== High school ===
Year	Team	Overall	Conference	Standing	Bowl/playoffs
Gilmour Academy Lancers () (2022)
2022	Gilmour Academy	9–2			
Gilmour Academy:		9–2			
Total:		9–2			
