= 2019 Buffalo Bulls football team =

American college football season

2019 Buffalo Bulls football

Bahamas Bowl champion

Bahamas Bowl, W 31–9 vs. Charlotte
- Conference: Mid-American Conference
- East Division
- Record: 8–5 (5–3 MAC)
- Head coach: Lance Leipold (5th season)
- Offensive coordinator: Andy Kotelnicki (5th season)
- Offensive scheme: Multiple pro-style
- Defensive coordinator: Brian Borland (5th season)
- Base defense: 4–3
- Captains: Kayode Awosika; Ledarius Mack; Matt Otwinowski; James Patterson; Jaret Patterson
- Home stadium: University at Buffalo Stadium

Uniform
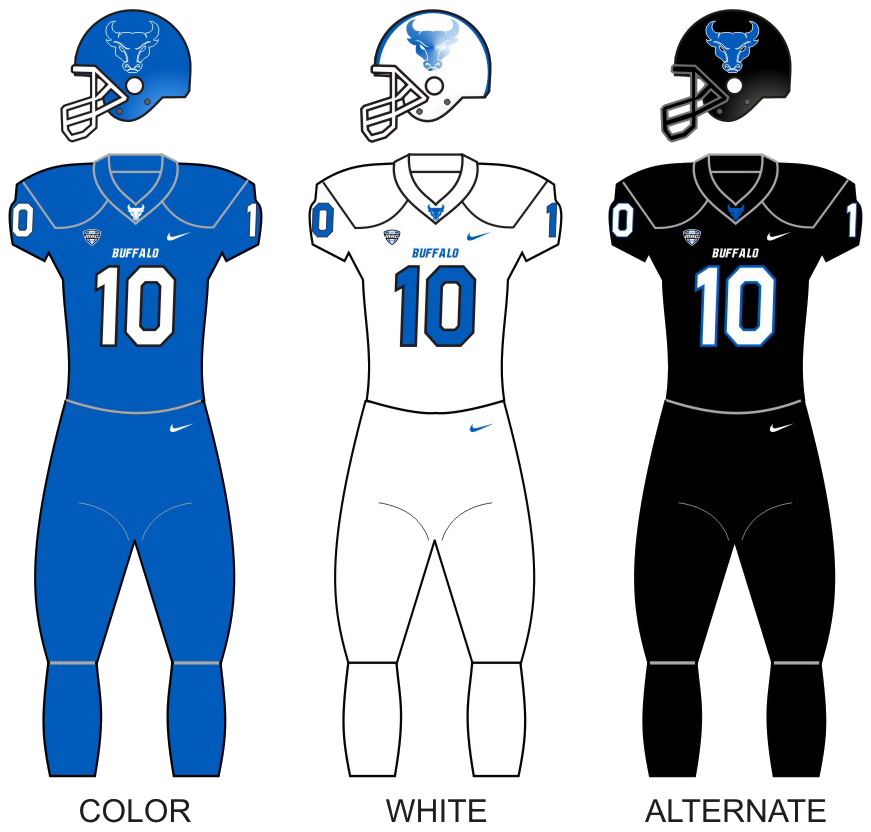

2019 Mid-American Conference football standings
	Conf.			Overall
Team	W		L	W		L
East Division
Miami (OH) x$	6	–	2	8	–	6
Ohio	5	–	3	7	–	6
Buffalo	5	–	3	8	–	5
Kent State	5	–	3	7	–	6
Bowling Green	2	–	6	3	–	9
Akron	0	–	8	0	–	12
West Division
Central Michigan x	6	–	2	8	–	6
Western Michigan	5	–	3	7	–	6
Ball State	4	–	4	5	–	7
Northern Illinois	4	–	4	5	–	7
Toledo	3	–	5	6	–	6
Eastern Michigan	3	–	5	6	–	7
Championship: Miami 26, Central Michigan 21
$ – Conference champion; x – Division champion/co-champions

The 2019 Buffalo Bulls football team represented the University at Buffalo as a member of the Mid-American Conference (MAC) during the 2019 NCAA Division I FBS football season. Led by fifth-year head coach Lance Leipold, the Bulls compiled an overall record of 8–5 with a mark of 5–3 in conference play, placing in a three-way tie for second in the MAC's East Division. Buffalo was invited to the Bahamas Bowl, where the Bulls defeated Charlotte. The team played home games at University at Buffalo Stadium in Amherst, New York.

== Schedule ==
Date	Time	Opponent	Site	TV	Result	Attendance
August 29	7:00 p.m.	Robert Morris*	University at Buffalo Stadium; Amherst, NY	ESPN+	W 38–10	18,412
September 7	7:30 p.m.	at No. 15 Penn State*	Beaver Stadium; University Park, PA	FOX	L 13–45	104,136
September 14	6:00 p.m.	at Liberty*	Williams Stadium; Lynchburg, VA	ESPN+	L 17–35	14,584
September 21	3:30 p.m.	Temple*	University at Buffalo Stadium; Amherst, NY	ESPNU	W 38–22	17,621
September 28	12:00 p.m.	at Miami (OH)	Yager Stadium; Oxford, OH	ESPNU	L 20–34	18,419
October 5	3:30 p.m.	Ohio^{†}	University at Buffalo Stadium; Amherst, NY	ESPN+	L 20–21 ^{OT}	20,042
October 19	3:00 p.m.	at Akron	InfoCision Stadium–Summa Field; Akron, OH	ESPN3	W 21–0	16,909
October 26	3:30 p.m.	Central Michigan	University at Buffalo Stadium; Amherst, NY	ESPN+	W 43–20	14,850
November 2	12:00 p.m.	at Eastern Michigan	Rynearson Stadium; Ypsilanti, MI	ESPNU	W 43–14	16,017
November 14	7:00 p.m.	at Kent State	Dix Stadium; Kent, OH	CBSSN	L 27–30	8,450
November 20	7:30 p.m.	Toledo	University at Buffalo Stadium; Amherst, NY	ESPN2	W 49–30	13,830
November 29	12:00 p.m.	Bowling Green	University at Buffalo Stadium; Amherst, NY	ESPN+	W 49–7	13,749
December 20	2:00 p.m.	vs. Charlotte*	Thomas Robinson Stadium; Nassau, Bahamas (Bahamas Bowl)	ESPN	W 31–9	13,547
*Non-conference game; ^{†}Homecoming; Rankings from AP Poll and CFP Rankings after November 5 released prior to game; All times are in Eastern time

== Preseason ==
=== MAC media poll ===
The MAC released their preseason media poll on July 23, 2019, with the Bulls predicted to finish in third place in the East Division.

== Game summaries ==
=== Robert Morris ===
	1	2	3	4	Total
Colonials	7	3	0	0	10
Bulls	21	7	10	0	38

=== At Penn State ===
	1	2	3	4	Total
Bulls	0	10	3	0	13
No. 15 Nittany Lions	7	0	28	10	45

=== At Liberty ===
	1	2	3	4	Total
Bulls	0	7	3	7	17
Flames	7	21	7	0	35

=== Temple ===
	1	2	3	4	Total
Owls	7	0	3	12	22
Bulls	0	24	7	7	38

=== At Miami (OH) ===
	1	2	3	4	Total
Bulls	7	7	0	6	20
RedHawks	0	13	21	0	34

=== Ohio ===
	1	2	3	4	OT	Total
Bobcats	0	0	7	7	7	21
Bulls	0	7	0	7	6	20

=== At Akron ===
	1	2	3	4	Total
Bulls	7	0	7	7	21
Zips	0	0	0	0	0

=== Central Michigan ===
	1	2	3	4	Total
Chippewas	7	7	0	6	20
Bulls	3	27	3	10	43

=== At Eastern Michigan ===
	1	2	3	4	Total
Bulls	2	27	7	7	43
Eagles	7	0	0	7	14

=== At Kent State ===
	1	2	3	4	Total
Bulls	7	10	7	3	27
Golden Flashes	0	6	0	24	30

=== Toledo ===
	1	2	3	4	Total
Rockets	7	13	3	7	30
Bulls	14	14	7	14	49

=== Bowling Green ===
	1	2	3	4	Total
Falcons	0	7	0	0	7
Bulls	21	14	0	14	49

=== Vs. Charlotte—Bahamas Bowl ===
	1	2	3	4	Total
Bulls	7	10	7	7	31
49ers	0	0	6	3	9

== Roster ==
2019 Buffalo Bulls football team roster
Players
Coaches
Offense

Pos.	#	Name	Class
WR	1	Antonio Nunn	Jr
WR	4	Isaiah King	So
RB	5	Kevin Marks	So
QB	7	Kyle Vantrease	So
RB	8	Dylan McDuffie	Fr
QB	9	Dominic Johnson	Jr
QB	10	Matt Myers	Fr
RB	11	Theo Anderson	Jr
WR	13	Tito Overton	Jr
WR	14	Jelani Foster	Fr
WR	18	Trevor Wilson	Fr
WR	19	Shemar Hayes	So
RB	21	Tajay Ahmed	Fr
RB	26	Jaret Patterson	So
WR	27	Steven Shoemaker	So
WR	30	Josh Griffen	So
TE	36	Cole Burniston	Fr
RB	43	Solomon Brown	Fr
TE	44	Jake Molinich	Jr
OL	59	Jake Fuzak	Jr
OL	60	Trevor Cahill	Fr
OL	62	Mike Novitsky	Fr
OL	63	Austin Kunick	Sr
OL	64	Michael Kenefick	Sr
OL	65	Tomas Jack-Kurdyla	Sr
OL	66	Jacob Gall	So
OL	67	Evin Ksiezarczyk	Sr
OL	70	Tyler Leroux	Fr
OL	71	Dan Kubik	So
OL	72	Paul Nosworthy	Sr
OL	73	Kayode Awosika	Jr
OL	75	Trey Derouen	Sr
OL	76	Anthony Laudicina	Fr
OL	79	Jack Klenk	Jr
TE	80	Matt McCarthy	Fr
TE	85	Julien Bourassa	So
WR	86	LeMaro Smith Jr.	Fr
WR	87	Jovany Ruiz	Jr
WR	88	Dajuan Hudson	Sr
TE	89	Zac Lefebvre	Jr

Defense

Pos.	#	Name	Class
S	2	Ashton White	Sr
CB	3	Aapri Washington	So
LB	5	Tim Terry Jr.	So
S	7	Dawun Hylton	So
CB	12	Devon Russell	Sr
LB	13	Sean Colgan	Jr
LB	16	Max Michel	Fr
LB	18	Roy Baker	Jr
LB	20	James Patterson	So
LB	21	Justin Mulbah	Jr
S	22	Joey Banks	Sr
LB	23	Jake Zimmer	Fr
S	24	Corey Gross Jr.	Fr
S	28	Dev Lamour	Sr
CB	30	Wankeith Akin Jr.	So
LB	31	Kadofi Wright	Jr
S	32	Owen Chambers	Fr
S	33	Tyrone Hill	Jr
LB	34	Ja'Varius Harrison	Jr
CB	35	Ali Abbas	Jr
CB	39	Dylan Powell	Jr
LB	42	Matt Otwinowski	Sr
S	45	Evan Gantley	So
LB	48	Fabian Weitz	Fr
DE	49	Taylor Riggins	Jr
DE	50	Malcolm Koonce	Jr
DE	51	Xander Heim	So
DE	52	Ledarius Mack	Sr
DE	53	Eric Black	So
DT	54	DeShondrick Foxworth	Sr
DT	91	Eddie Wilson	So
DT	92	Ronald McGee	So
DT	93	Chibueze Onwuka	Jr
DT	95	Tyrece Woods, Jr.	Fr
DT	97	Atunaisa Vainikolo	Jr
DE	99	Frendy Darelus	So

Special teams

Pos.	#	Name	Class
K	11	Alex McNulty	So
P	40	Evan Finegan	So
LS	57	Jeremiah Riordan	Jr

Head coach

- Lance Leipold

Coordinators/assistant coaches

- Rob Ianello (Associate head coach / recruiting coordinator / wide receivers)
- Brian Borland (defensive coordinator / cornerbacks)
- Andy Kotelnicki (offensive coordinator / running backs)
- Scott Fuchs (offensive line)
- Alan Hensell (tight ends)
- Chris Simpson (Linebackers / defensive run game coordinator)
- Brad McCaslin (defensive tackles)
- Jim Zebrowski (Quarterbacks / Co-offensive coordinator / passing game coordinator)
- Taiwo Onatolu (defensive ends / special teams coordinator)
- Jeff Burrow (safeties)
- Matt Gildersleeve (head strength and conditioning coach)
- Ryan Wilson (graduate assistant)
- Daniel Allen (graduate assistant)
- James Daniels (graduate assistant)
- Isaac Reed (graduate assistant)

Legend

- (C) Team captain
- (S) Suspended
- (I) Ineligible
- Injured
- Redshirt

Roster
Last update: April 24, 2019
