= Matt Feeney =

American football player and coach (born 1991)

Arizona Cardinals
- Title: Outside linebackers coach

Personal information
- Born: October 8, 1991 (age 35); Dublin, Ohio, U.S.

Career information
- Position: Linebacker
- College: John Carroll (2010–2013)

Career history
- John Carroll (2014-2016); Inside linebackers coach (2014); Co-special teams coordinator & inside linebackers coach (2015-2016); Chattanooga (2017-2018); Linebackers coach (2017); Defensive coordinator & linebackers coach (2018); Akron (2019-2021); Defensive coordinator & linebackers coach (2019); Defensive coordinator & safeties coach (2020-2021); Las Vegas Raiders (2022–2024); Defensive quality control coach (2022-2023); Assistant defensive backs coach (2024); Arizona Cardinals (2025–present) Outside linebackers coach

Matt Feeney (born October 8, 1991) is an American professional football coach who is the outside linebackers coach for the Arizona Cardinals of the National Football League (NFL) He previously served as the assistant defensive backs coach for the Las Vegas Raiders in 2024.

Feeney played college football at John Carroll as a linebacker from 2010 to 2013. He previously served as an assistant coach for the Raiders, the University of Akron, University of Tennessee at Chattanooga and John Carroll University.

== Playing career ==
Feeney played linebacker for John Carroll from 2010 through 2013, while completing his degree in marketing, with a minor in entrepreneurship. He was a four-year letterwinner, and as a senior, he was awarded the Ohio Athletic Conference's Gene Slaughter Most Outstanding Linebacker Award. He was also an All-Conference honoree, and well as a two time Conference Defensive Player of the week.

== Coaching career ==
=== John Carroll ===
Following his playing career and graduation, Feeney immediately joined the coaching staff at John Carroll as the inside linebackers coach in 2014. The following season, Feeney added co-special teams coordinator responsibilities. This was all done as a graduate assistant while he was taking classes for a master's degree.

=== Chattanooga ===
When John Carroll head coach Tom Arth was named the new head coach at Chattanooga, he brought Feeney with him. In 2017, Feeney was in charge of coaching the linebackers, and in 2018, he was promoted to defensive coordinator. He was only 26 years old.

=== Akron ===
In January 2019, it was announced that Feeney would be following Arth to Akron to again serve as the defensive coordinator and linebackers coach.

=== Western Illinois ===
After Arth was fired and the staff at Akron was released, Feeney joined new Western Illinois Leathernecks coach, Myers Hendrickson's staff as the defensive coordinator.

=== Las Vegas Raiders ===
In 2022, Feeney was hired by the Las Vegas Raiders as a defensive quality control coach under head coach Josh McDaniels. In 2024, Feeney was retained by the Raiders and was promoted to assistant defensive backs coach under head coach Antonio Pierce.

=== Arizona Cardinals ===
On February 12, 2025, Feeney was hired by the Arizona Cardinals as their outside linebackers coach under head coach Jonathan Gannon.
