= 2019 Toledo Rockets football team =

American college football season

2019 Toledo Rockets football
- Conference: Mid-American Conference
- West Division
- Record: 6–6 (3–5 MAC)
- Head coach: Jason Candle (4th season)
- Offensive coordinator: Brian Wright (4th season)
- Offensive scheme: Spread
- Defensive coordinator: Brian George (4th season)
- Base defense: 4–3
- Home stadium: Glass Bowl

2019 Mid-American Conference football standings
	Conf.			Overall
Team	W		L	W		L
East Division
Miami (OH) x$	6	–	2	8	–	6
Ohio	5	–	3	7	–	6
Buffalo	5	–	3	8	–	5
Kent State	5	–	3	7	–	6
Bowling Green	2	–	6	3	–	9
Akron	0	–	8	0	–	12
West Division
Central Michigan x	6	–	2	8	–	6
Western Michigan	5	–	3	7	–	6
Ball State	4	–	4	5	–	7
Northern Illinois	4	–	4	5	–	7
Toledo	3	–	5	6	–	6
Eastern Michigan	3	–	5	6	–	7
Championship: Miami 26, Central Michigan 21
$ – Conference champion; x – Division champion/co-champions

The 2019 Toledo Rockets football team represented the University of Toledo during the 2019 NCAA Division I FBS football season. The Rockets were led by fourth-year head coach Jason Candle and played their home games at the Glass Bowl in Toledo, Ohio. They competed as members of the West Division of the Mid-American Conference (MAC). Although finishing their regular season with a bowl eligible 6–6 record, they were the only bowl-eligible team not invited to a bowl game.

== Preseason ==
=== MAC media poll ===
The MAC released their preseason media poll on July 23, 2019, with the Rockets predicted to finish in first place in the West Division.

== Schedule ==
Date	Time	Opponent	Site	TV	Result	Attendance
August 31	12:00 p.m.	at Kentucky*	Kroger Field; Lexington, KY	SECN	L 24–38	54,610
September 14	7:00 p.m.	Murray State*	Glass Bowl; Toledo, OH	ESPN3	W 45–0	25,361
September 21	10:15 p.m.	at Colorado State*	Canvas Stadium; Fort Collins, CO	ESPN2	W 41–35	24,464
September 28	12:00 p.m.	BYU*	Glass Bowl; Toledo, OH	ESPN+	W 28–21	24,889
October 5	3:30 p.m.	Western Michigan^{†}	Glass Bowl; Toledo, OH	ESPN+	W 31–24	22,141
October 12	12:00 p.m.	at Bowling Green	Doyt Perry Stadium; Bowling Green, OH (rivalry)	CBSSN	L 7–20	19,199
October 19	2:00 p.m.	at Ball State	Scheumann Stadium; Muncie, IN	ESPN+	L 14–52	15,113
October 26	3:00 p.m.	Eastern Michigan	Glass Bowl; Toledo, OH	ESPN+	W 37–34 ^{OT}	18,061
November 5	7:00 p.m.	Kent State	Glass Bowl; Toledo, OH	CBSSN	W 35–33	16,331
November 13	8:00 p.m.	Northern Illinois	Glass Bowl; Toledo, OH	ESPN2	L 28–31	15,610
November 20	7:30 p.m.	at Buffalo	University at Buffalo Stadium; Amherst, NY	ESPN2	L 30–49	13,830
November 29	12:00 p.m.	at Central Michigan	Kelly/Shorts Stadium; Mount Pleasant, MI	ESPNU	L 7–49	9,101
*Non-conference game; ^{†}Homecoming; All times are in Eastern time

== Game summaries ==
=== At Kentucky ===
	1	2	3	4	Total
Rockets	7	7	3	7	24
Wildcats	0	14	10	14	38

=== Murray State ===
	1	2	3	4	Total
Racers	0	0	0	0	0
Rockets	3	14	21	7	45

=== At Colorado State ===
	1	2	3	4	Total
Rockets	7	7	21	6	41
Rams	7	6	14	8	35

=== BYU ===
	1	2	3	4	Total
Cougars	0	7	14	0	21
Rockets	0	3	11	14	28

=== Western Michigan ===
	1	2	3	4	Total
Broncos	7	0	10	7	24
Rockets	14	10	0	7	31

=== At Bowling Green ===
	1	2	3	4	Total
Rockets	0	7	0	0	7
Falcons	10	7	3	0	20

=== At Ball State ===
	1	2	3	4	Total
Rockets	0	0	7	7	14
Cardinals	17	21	14	0	52

=== Eastern Michigan ===
	1	2	3	4	OT	Total
Eagles	0	10	6	15	3	34
Rockets	7	3	21	0	6	37

=== Kent State ===
	1	2	3	4	Total
Golden Flashes	10	7	10	6	33
Rockets	14	14	0	7	35

=== Northern Illinois ===
	1	2	3	4	Total
Huskies	7	7	14	3	31
Rockets	7	0	0	21	28

=== At Buffalo ===
	1	2	3	4	Total
Rockets	7	13	3	7	30
Bulls	14	14	7	14	49

=== At Central Michigan ===
	1	2	3	4	Total
Rockets	0	7	0	0	7
Chippewas	14	21	7	7	49
