= 2019 Northern Illinois Huskies football team =

American college football season

2019 Northern Illinois Huskies football
- Conference: Mid-American Conference
- West Division
- Record: 5–7 (4–4 MAC)
- Head coach: Thomas Hammock (1st season)
- Offensive coordinator: Eric Eidsness (1st season)
- Offensive scheme: Multiple
- Defensive coordinator: Derrick Jackson (1st season)
- Base defense: 4–2–5
- MVP: Mykelti Williams
- Captains: Jordan Steckler; Mykelti Williams; Jack Heflin; Daniel Crawford
- Home stadium: Huskie Stadium

2019 Mid-American Conference football standings
	Conf.			Overall
Team	W		L	W		L
East Division
Miami (OH) x$	6	–	2	8	–	6
Ohio	5	–	3	7	–	6
Buffalo	5	–	3	8	–	5
Kent State	5	–	3	7	–	6
Bowling Green	2	–	6	3	–	9
Akron	0	–	8	0	–	12
West Division
Central Michigan x	6	–	2	8	–	6
Western Michigan	5	–	3	7	–	6
Ball State	4	–	4	5	–	7
Northern Illinois	4	–	4	5	–	7
Toledo	3	–	5	6	–	6
Eastern Michigan	3	–	5	6	–	7
Championship: Miami 26, Central Michigan 21
$ – Conference champion; x – Division champion/co-champions

The 2019 Northern Illinois Huskies football team represented Northern Illinois University as a member of the West Division of the Mid-American Conference (MAC) during the 2019 NCAA Division I FBS football season. Led by first-year head coach Thomas Hammock the Huskies compiled an overall record of 5–7 with a mark of 4–4 in conference play, tying for third place in the MAC"s West Division. The team played home games at Huskie Stadium in DeKalb, Illinois.

== Offseason ==
=== Coaching changes ===
On January 11, 2019, head coach Rod Carey accepted the head coach position at Temple. On January 18, the school hired NIU alum and Baltimore Ravens assistant coach Thomas Hammock as the new head coach. Hammock was a star running back for the Huskies from 1999 to 2002.

On January 25, Hammock announced the hiring of Eric Eidsness, the offensive coordinator for South Dakota State, to the same position. On February 11, Derrick Jackson was announced as the new defensive coordinator. Jackson had spent the previous two seasons as cornerbacks coach and defensive recruiting coordinator at Purdue.

== Preseason ==
=== MAC media poll ===
The MAC released their preseason media poll on July 23, 2019, with the Huskies predicted to finish in third place in the West Division.

== Schedule ==
Date	Time	Opponent	Site	TV	Result	Attendance
August 31	6:00 p.m.	No. 15 (FCS) Illinois State*	Huskie Stadium; DeKalb, IL	ESPN+	W 24–10	14,568
September 7	12:00 p.m.	at No. 13 Utah*	Rice–Eccles Stadium; Salt Lake City, UT	P12N	L 17–35	45,919
September 14	7:00 p.m.	at Nebraska*	Memorial Stadium; Lincoln, NE	FS1	L 8–44	89,593
September 28	11:00 a.m.	at Vanderbilt*	Vanderbilt Stadium; Nashville, TN	SECN	L 18–24	24,519
October 5	2:30 p.m.	Ball State	Huskie Stadium; DeKalb, IL (Bronze Stalk Trophy)	ESPN3	L 20–27	10,365
October 12	2:30 p.m.	at Ohio	Peden Stadium; Athens, OH	ESPN+	W 39–36	18,019
October 19	2:30 p.m.	at Miami (OH)	Yager Stadium; Oxford, OH	ESPN+	L 24–27	11,710
October 26	2:30 p.m.	Akron^{†}	Huskie Stadium; DeKalb, IL	ESPN3	W 49–0	9,027
November 2	11:00 a.m.	at Central Michigan	Kelly/Shorts Stadium; Mount Pleasant, MI	CBSSN	L 10–48	10,438
November 13	7:00 p.m.	at Toledo	Glass Bowl; Toledo, OH	ESPN2	W 31–28	15,610
November 19	6:30 p.m.	Eastern Michigan	Huskie Stadium; DeKalb, IL	ESPN2	L 17–45	5,062
November 26	6:00 p.m.	Western Michigan	Huskie Stadium; DeKalb, IL	ESPNU	W 17–14	3,568
*Non-conference game; ^{†}Homecoming; Rankings from AP Poll and CFP Rankings after November 5 released prior to game; All times are in Central time

== Game summaries ==
=== Illinois State ===
	1	2	3	4	Total
No. 15 (FCS) Redbirds	0	3	0	7	10
Huskies	3	0	7	14	24

=== At Utah ===
	1	2	3	4	Total
Huskies	7	10	0	0	17
No. 13 Utes	0	21	7	7	35

=== At Nebraska ===
	1	2	3	4	Total
Huskies	0	5	3	0	8
Cornhuskers	10	20	7	7	44

=== At Vanderbilt ===
	1	2	3	4	Total
Huskies	0	0	10	8	18
Commodores	14	0	7	3	24

=== Ball State ===
	1	2	3	4	Total
Cardinals	0	3	14	10	27
Huskies	14	3	0	3	20

=== At Ohio ===
	1	2	3	4	Total
Huskies	10	0	12	17	39
Bobcats	7	14	0	15	36

=== At Miami (OH) ===
	1	2	3	4	Total
Huskies	3	7	7	7	24
RedHawks	0	7	14	6	27

=== Akron ===
	1	2	3	4	Total
Zips	0	0	0	0	0
Huskies	7	14	14	14	49

=== At Central Michigan ===
	1	2	3	4	Total
Huskies	3	7	0	0	10
Chippewas	21	17	0	10	48

=== At Toledo ===
	1	2	3	4	Total
Huskies	7	7	14	3	31
Rockets	7	0	0	21	28

=== Eastern Michigan ===
	1	2	3	4	Total
Eagles	7	7	24	7	45
Huskies	0	7	3	7	17

=== Western Michigan ===
	1	2	3	4	Total
Broncos	0	0	7	7	14
Huskies	3	7	0	7	17
