= 2019 MAC Championship Game =

2019 Marathon MAC Championship Game
- Conference Championship
Miami RedHawks	Central Michigan Chippewas
(7–5)	(8–4)
26	21
Head coach: Chuck Martin	Head coach: Jim McElwain
	1	2	3	4	Total
Miami	7	3	7	9	26
Central Michigan	0	14	0	7	21
- Date: December 7, 2019
- Season: 2019
- Stadium: Ford Field
- Location: Detroit, Michigan
- MVP: Offense: Jack Sorensen (WR, Miami); Defense: Emmanuel Rugamba (LB, Miami)
- Favorite: Central Michigan by 6
- Referee: Ron Hudson
- Attendance: 22,427

United States TV coverage
- Network: ESPN2
- Announcers: Anish Shroff (play-by-play), John Congemi (analyst) and Kris Budden (sideline)

2019 Mid-American Conference football standings
	Conf.			Overall
Team	W		L	W		L
East Division
Miami (OH) x$	6	–	2	8	–	6
Ohio	5	–	3	7	–	6
Buffalo	5	–	3	8	–	5
Kent State	5	–	3	7	–	6
Bowling Green	2	–	6	3	–	9
Akron	0	–	8	0	–	12
West Division
Central Michigan x	6	–	2	8	–	6
Western Michigan	5	–	3	7	–	6
Ball State	4	–	4	5	–	7
Northern Illinois	4	–	4	5	–	7
Toledo	3	–	5	6	–	6
Eastern Michigan	3	–	5	6	–	7
Championship: Miami 26, Central Michigan 21
$ – Conference champion; x – Division champion/co-champions

The 2019 MAC Championship Game was a college football game played on Saturday, December 7, 2019, at Ford Field in Detroit, Michigan, to determine the 2019 champion of the Mid-American Conference (MAC). With sponsorship from Marathon Petroleum, the game was officially the 2019 Marathon MAC Football Championship Game. The game featured the East division champions Miami (of Ohio) and the West division champions Central Michigan, and was the conference's 23rd championship game. The game was won by Miami, 26–21.

== Previous season ==
The 2018 MAC Championship Game featured East Division champion Buffalo against West Division champion Northern Illinois. The Huskies upset the Bulls in a 30–29, to win their fourth title.

== Teams ==
The 2019 MAC Championship Game was contested by the Miami RedHawks, East Division champions, and the Central Michigan Chippewas of West division. Miami leads the all-time series 14–13–1; the teams last met in 2017, when Miami won 31–14.

=== Miami ===
Miami clinched its spot in the Championship Game after Buffalo lost to Kent State on November 14. A day after Miami defeated Bowling Green, to gain their seventh win their conference. This is Miami's fifth overall appearance in the Championship Game, their first since 2010. The RedHawks compile a 2–2 record in the game, winning in 2003 and in 2010.

=== Central Michigan ===
The Chippewas entered the game 8-4 and 6-2 in the MAC. Their four losses came to Wisconsin, Miami (FL), Western Michigan and Buffalo. They clinched the division in the last week of the season, with a win over Toledo. The Chippewas are 3-0 in MAC Championship games, with their most recent win coming in 2009.

== Game summary ==
2019 MAC Championship Game

Quarter	1	2	3	4	Total
Miami	7	3	7	9	26
Central Michigan	0	14	0	7	21

at Ford Field • Detroit, Michigan

- Date: Saturday, December 7, 2019
- Game time: 12:00 p.m. EST
- Game attendance: 22,427
- Referee: Ron Hudson
- TV announcers (ESPN2): Anish Shroff (play-by-play), John Congemi (analyst) and Kris Budden (sideline)
- ESPN game summary

Game information

First Quarter

- (13:59) MIA – Jaylon Bester 1 yard rush, Sam Sloman kick (Drive: 2 plays, 2 yards, 1:01; Miami 7–0)

Second Quarter

- (11:46) CMU – Tommy Lazzaro 21 yard rush, Ryan Tice kick (Drive: 14 plays, 90 yards, 7:07; Tied 7–7)
- (8:26) MIA – Sam Sloman 41 yard field goal (Drive: 4 plays, –4 yards, 0:58; Miami 10–7)
- (0:30) CMU – Quinten Dormady 11 yard pass to Tyrone Scott, Ryan Tice kick (Drive: 8 plays, 46 yards, 2:27; Central Michigan 14–10)

Third Quarter

- (12:05) MIA – Brent Gabbert 31 yard pass to Jack Sorenson, Sam Sloman kick (Drive: 4 plays, 67 yards, 1:07; Miami 17–14)

Fourth Quarter

- (11:38) MIA – Sam Sloman 33 yard field goal (Drive: 12 plays, 54 yards, 5:18; Miami 20–14)
- (4:06) MIA – Sam Sloman 48 yard field goal (Drive: 10 plays, 59 yards, 6:01; Miami 23–14)
- (1:24) CMU – Tommy Lazzaro 4 yard rush, Ryan Tice kick (Drive: 9 plays, 75 yards, 2:42; Miami 23–21)
- (0:28) MIA – Sam Sloman 42 yard field goal (Drive: 4 plays, 6 yards, 0:56; Miami 26–21)

=== Statistics ===
Statistics	MIA	CMU
First downs	15	20
Plays–yards	62–272	74–355
Rushes–yards	35–76	31–99
Passing yards	196	256
Passing: comp–att–int	14–27–0	27–43–1
Turnovers		
Time of possession	30:05	29:55

Team	Category	Player	Statistics
Miami (OH)	Passing	Brett Gabbert	14/27, 196 yards, 1 TD
Miami (OH)	Rushing	Jaylon Bester	20 carries, 66 yards, 1 TD
Miami (OH)	Receiving	Jack Sorenson	8 receptions, 123 yards, 1 TD
Central Michigan	Passing	Quinten Dormady	26/41, 232 yards, 1 TD, 1 INT
Central Michigan	Rushing	Tommy Lazzaro	6 carries, 48 yards, 2 TD
Central Michigan	Receiving	JaCorey Sullivan	7 receptions, 64 yards

== See also ==
- List of Mid-American Conference football champions
