= 2019 Eastern Michigan Eagles football team =

American college football season

2019 Eastern Michigan Eagles football

Quick Lane Bowl, L 30–34 vs. Pittsburgh
- Conference: Mid-American Conference
- West Division
- Record: 6–7 (3–5 MAC)
- Head coach: Chris Creighton (6th season)
- Offensive coordinator: Aaron Keen (3rd season)
- Offensive scheme: Spread
- Defensive coordinator: Neal Neathery (4th season)
- Base defense: 4–2–5
- Home stadium: Rynearson Stadium

Uniform
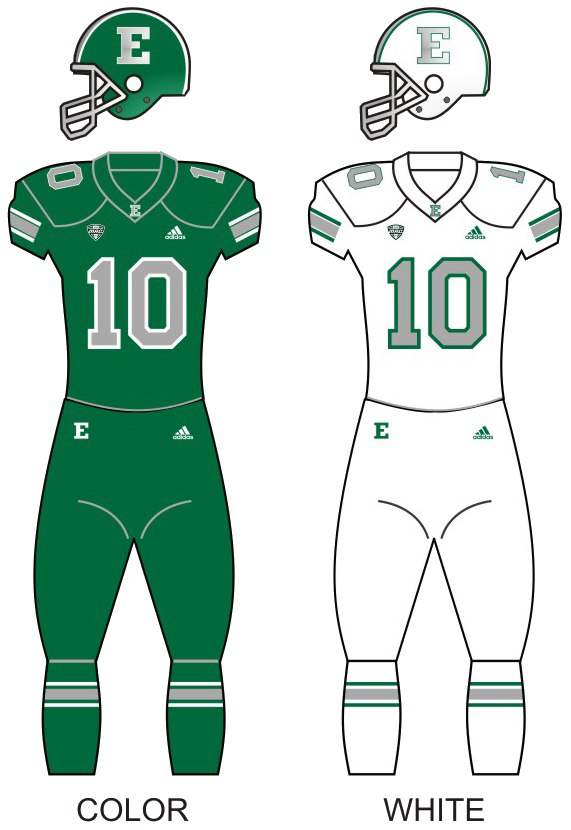

2019 Mid-American Conference football standings
	Conf.			Overall
Team	W		L	W		L
East Division
Miami (OH) x$	6	–	2	8	–	6
Ohio	5	–	3	7	–	6
Buffalo	5	–	3	8	–	5
Kent State	5	–	3	7	–	6
Bowling Green	2	–	6	3	–	9
Akron	0	–	8	0	–	12
West Division
Central Michigan x	6	–	2	8	–	6
Western Michigan	5	–	3	7	–	6
Ball State	4	–	4	5	–	7
Northern Illinois	4	–	4	5	–	7
Toledo	3	–	5	6	–	6
Eastern Michigan	3	–	5	6	–	7
Championship: Miami 26, Central Michigan 21
$ – Conference champion; x – Division champion/co-champions

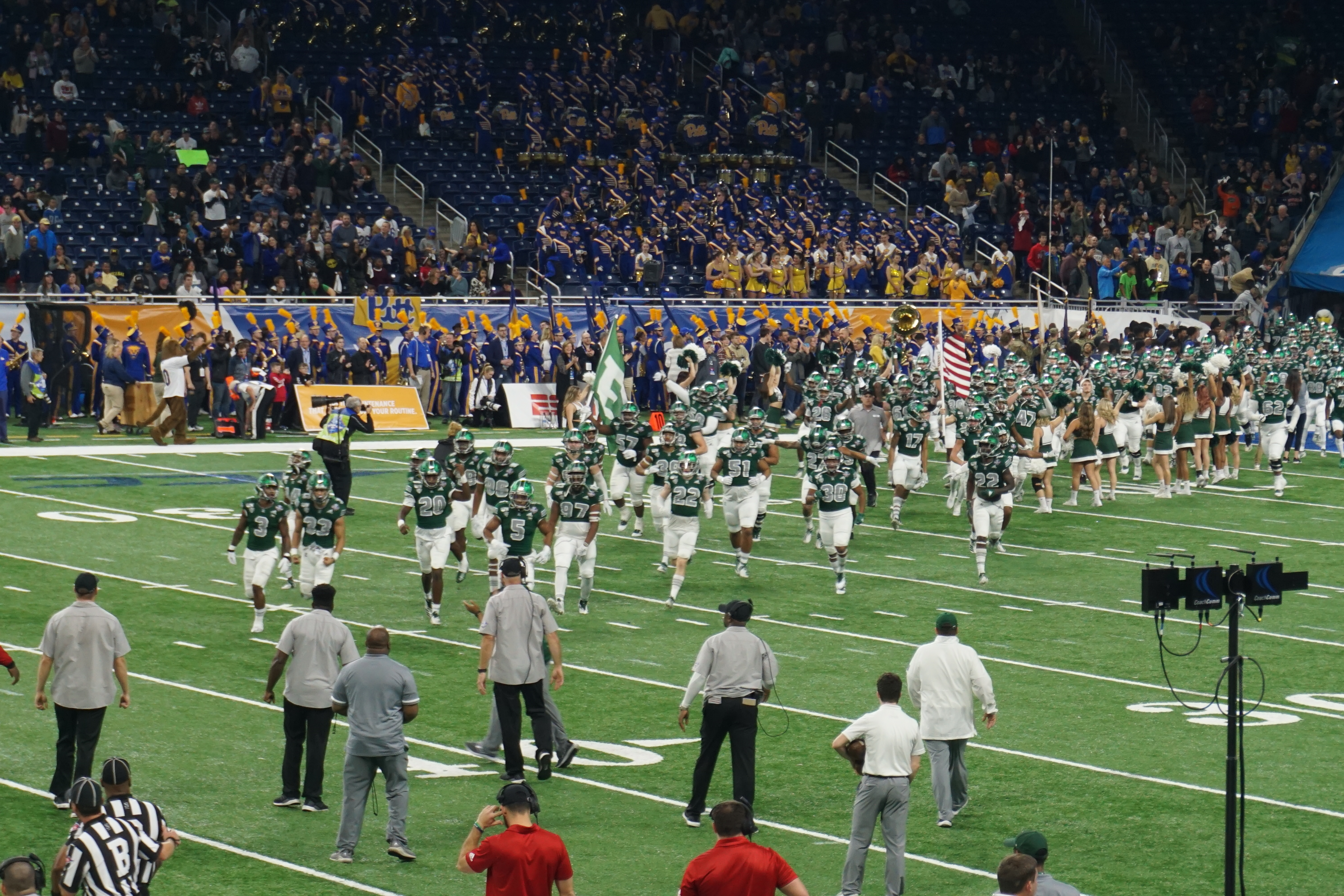
2019 Eastern Michigan team at the Quick Lane Bowl

The 2019 Eastern Michigan Eagles football team represented Eastern Michigan University during the 2019 NCAA Division I FBS football season. The Eagles were led by sixth-year head coach Chris Creighton and played their home games at Rynearson Stadium in Ypsilanti, Michigan. They competed as members of the West Division of the Mid-American Conference (MAC).

== Preseason ==
=== MAC media poll ===
The MAC released their preseason media poll on July 23, 2019, with the Eagles predicted to finish in fourth place in the West Division.

== Schedule ==
Eastern Michigan's 2019 schedule would begin with four non-conference games, with three away games against Coastal Carolina of the Sun Belt Conference, Kentucky of the Southeastern Conference (SEC), and Illinois of the Big Ten Conference, and then a home game against Central Connecticut of the Northeast Conference. In Mid-American Conference play, the Eagles would play home games against Ball State, Western Michigan, Buffalo, and Kent State, and road games against Central Michigan, Toledo, Akron, and Northern Illinois. They would not play East Division members Miami, Ohio, or Bowling Green as part of the regular season.

Date	Time	Opponent	Site	TV	Result	Attendance
August 31	3:30 p.m.	at Coastal Carolina*	Brooks Stadium; Conway, SC	ESPN+	W 30–23	14,237
September 7	7:30 p.m.	at Kentucky*	Kroger Field; Lexington, KY	SECN Alt.	L 17–38	55,240
September 14	12:00 p.m.	at Illinois*	Memorial Stadium; Champaign, IL	BTN	W 34–31	45,250
September 21	3:00 p.m.	Central Connecticut*	Rynearson Stadium; Ypsilanti, MI	ESPN3	W 34–29	17,286
October 5	3:30 p.m.	at Central Michigan	Kelly/Shorts Stadium; Mount Pleasant, MI (Michigan MAC Trophy / rivalry)	ESPN+	L 16–42	15,235
October 12	2:00 p.m.	Ball State^{†}	Rynearson Stadium; Ypsilanti, MI	ESPN+	L 23–29	17,852
October 19	7:00 p.m.	Western Michigan	Rynearson Stadium; Ypsilanti, MI (Michigan MAC Trophy)	ESPN+	W 34–27	20,528
October 26	3:30 p.m.	at Toledo	Glass Bowl; Toledo, OH	ESPN+	L 34–37 ^{OT}	18,061
November 2	12:00 p.m.	Buffalo	Rynearson Stadium; Ypsilanti, MI	ESPNU	L 14–43	16,017
November 12	6:00 p.m.	at Akron	InfoCision Stadium; Akron, OH	ESPNews	W 42–14	10,811
November 19	7:30 p.m.	at Northern Illinois	Huskie Stadium; DeKalb, IL	ESPN2	W 45–17	5,062
November 29	12:00 p.m.	Kent State	Rynearson Stadium; Ypsilanti, MI	ESPN+	L 26–34	13,444
December 26	8:00 p.m.	vs. Pittsburgh*	Ford Field; Detroit, MI (Quick Lane Bowl)	ESPN	L 30–34	34,765
*Non-conference game; ^{†}Homecoming; Rankings from AP Poll and CFP Rankings after November 5 released prior to game; All times are in Eastern time

== Game summaries ==
=== At Coastal Carolina ===
	1	2	3	4	Total
Eagles	0	7	16	7	30
Chanticleers	10	3	0	10	23

=== At Kentucky ===
	1	2	3	4	Total
Eagles	0	3	7	7	17
Wildcats	14	3	7	14	38

=== At Illinois ===
	1	2	3	4	Total
Eagles	14	9	0	11	34
Fighting Illini	17	0	0	14	31

=== Central Connecticut ===
	1	2	3	4	Total
Blue Devils	15	0	0	14	29
Eagles	7	14	0	13	34

=== At Central Michigan ===
	1	2	3	4	Total
Eagles	3	0	7	6	16
Chippewas	7	14	14	7	42

=== Ball State ===
	1	2	3	4	Total
Cardinals	0	14	7	8	29
Eagles	7	10	6	0	23

=== Western Michigan ===
	1	2	3	4	Total
Broncos	7	7	7	6	27
Eagles	3	7	10	14	34

=== At Toledo ===
	1	2	3	4	OT	Total
Eagles	0	10	6	15	3	34
Rockets	7	3	21	0	6	37

=== Buffalo ===
	1	2	3	4	Total
Bulls	2	27	7	7	43
Eagles	7	0	0	7	14

=== At Akron ===
	1	2	3	4	Total
Eagles	7	14	14	7	42
Zips	0	0	7	7	14

=== At Northern Illinois ===
	1	2	3	4	Total
Eagles	7	7	24	7	45
Huskies	0	7	3	7	17

=== Kent State ===
	1	2	3	4	Total
Golden Flashes	14	10	7	3	34
Eagles	7	7	6	6	26

=== Vs. Pittsburgh (Quick Lane Bowl) ===
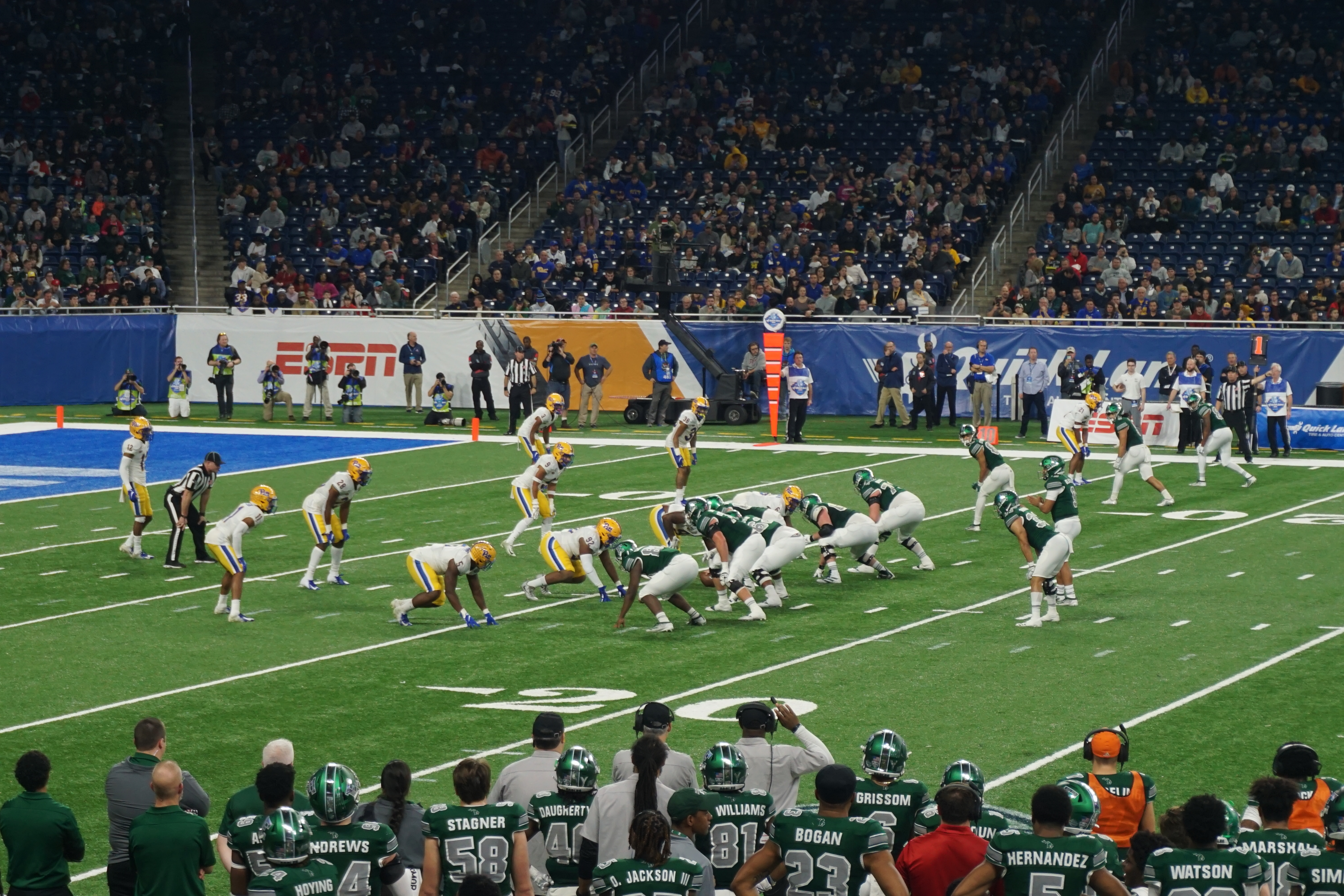
Eastern Michigan in action against Pittsburgh during the 2019 Quick Lane Bowl

	1	2	3	4	Total
Panthers	0	17	3	14	34
Eagles	10	10	0	10	30
