= Zach Gibson =

American football player (born 2000)

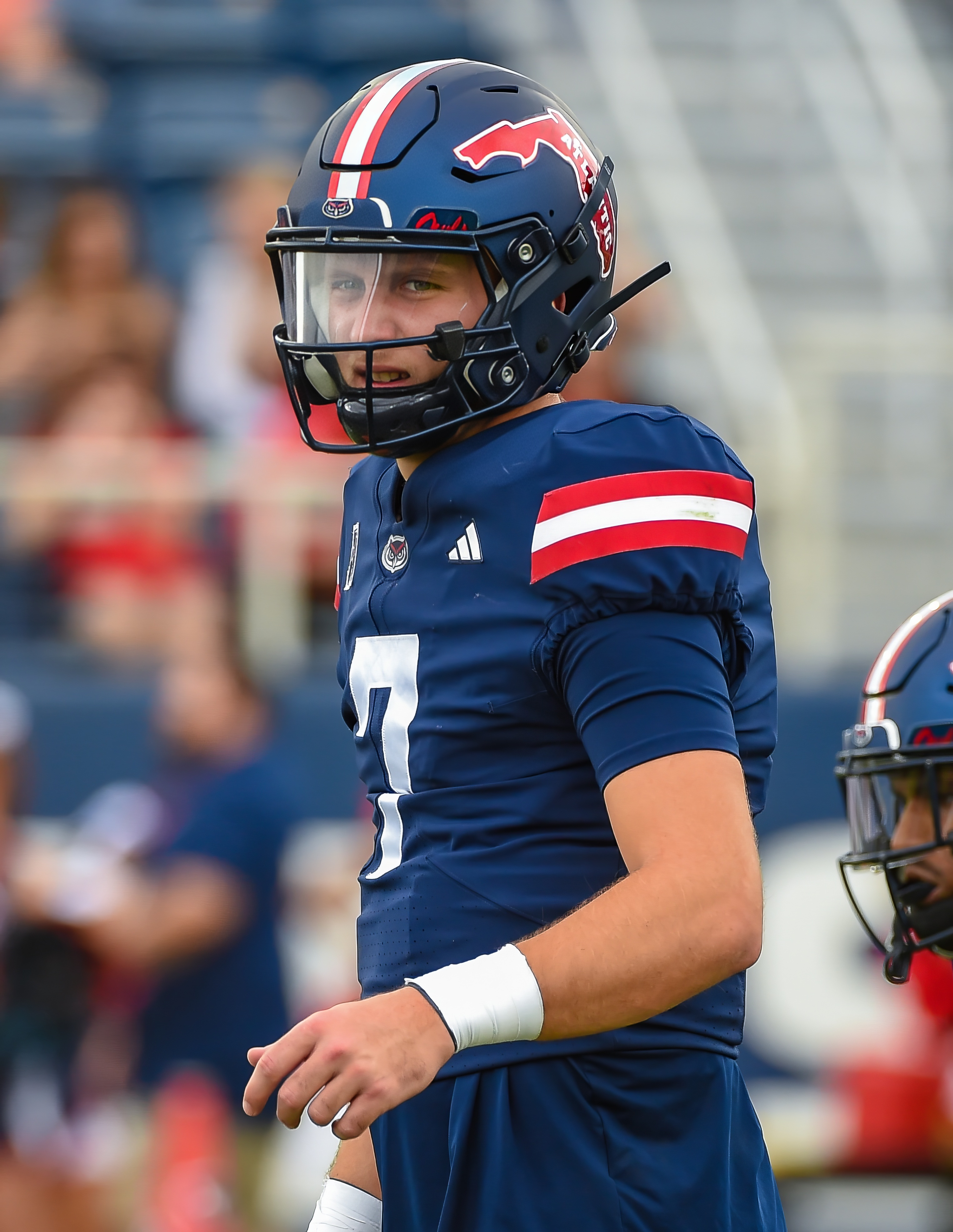
- Zach Gibson with Florida Atlantic in 2025

No. 7
- Position: Quarterback

Personal information
- Born: October 7, 2000 (age 26); Alpharetta, Georgia, U.S.
- Listed height: 6 ft 2 in (1.88 m)
- Listed weight: 210 lb (95 kg)

Career information
- High school: Johns Creek (Johns Creek, Georgia)
- College: Akron (2019–2021); Georgia Tech (2022–2023); Georgia State (2024); Florida Atlantic (2025)
- Stats at ESPN

Zach Gibson (born October 7, 2000) is an American former college football quarterback who played for the Akron, Georgia Tech, Georgia State, and Florida Atlantic Owls.

== Early life ==
Gibson attended Johns Creek High School in Johns Creek, Georgia. He was rated as a three-star recruit and committed to play for the Akron Zips.

== College career ==
=== Akron ===
As a freshman in 2019, he appeared in four games (two starts) and became just one of seven Zips quarterbacks to start during their true freshman seasons. He made his collegiate debut against Massachusetts and completed 12-of-16 passes for 173 yards and a touchdown. He made his first career start against Buffalo where Akron was defeated 21–0. On the season he completed 41-of-81 passes for 425 yards and one touchdown to three interceptions. He retained his redshirt status. In 2020, he started all six of Akron's games in the condensed COVID-19 pandemic season. The Zips went 1–5 with their lone win coming against Bowling Green. In 2021, Gibson lost the starting quarterback competition to Kato Nelson and DJ Irons. In game six, he relieved Nelson against Bowling Green and threw three second half touchdowns in a come from behind victory. He started the following five weeks, but came up winless. On the season Gibson completed 69.4% of his throws for 1,262 yards and 10 touchdowns to zero interceptions. At the conclusion of the season, Gibson announced that he would be transferring to Georgia Tech.

=== Georgia Tech ===
In 2022, Gibson made his Yellow Jackets debut in week six against Duke. He relieved starting quarterback Jeff Sims in overtime and helped Georgia Tech get into position for a game winning field goal. In game eight, he made his first Georgia Tech start against Florida State, but was ultimately replaced by Zach Pyron. In his second start against No. 13 North Carolina, Gibson led Georgia Tech from a 17 point deficit to a 21–17 upset victory. He completed 13-of-18 passes (72.2%) for 174 yards. In 2023, Gibson lost the starting quarterback competition to Haynes King and Pyron. He did not appear in a game and announced he was transferring on December 19.

=== Georgia State ===
On January 5, 2024, Gibson transferred to Georgia State. Gibson lost the starting quarterback competition to Pittsburgh transfer Christian Veilleux. He made his Panthers debut in the season opener against his former Yellow Jackets, but did not record any statistics in the loss. His first extensive action came in game five against Old Dominion, where he was a perfect six-for-six passing for 49 yards and a touchdown in a near come from behind victory. Gibson replaced Veilleux the following week against Marshall and threw for 192 yards and two touchdowns. He was named the starter for the following four weeks, but the Panthers were winless. On the season he appeared in seven games (four starts) and was 102-for-151 passing for 1,004 yards and seven touchdowns to two interceptions. On February 26, 2025, Gibson announced he was transferring for the third time.

=== Florida Atlantic ===
On April 23, 2025, Gibson transferred to Florida Atlantic. In 2025, Gibson is expected to compete for the starting quarterback position with Western Kentucky transfer Caden Veltkamp.

=== Statistics ===
Season	Team	Games			Passing								Rushing			
Season	Team	GP	GS	Record	Cmp	Att	Pct	Yds	Y/A	TD	Int	Rtg	Att	Yds	Avg	TD
2019	Akron	4	2	0–2	41	81	50.6	425	5.2	1	3	91.4	14	-72	-5.1	0
2020	Akron	6	6	1–5	76	132	57.6	784	5.9	4	5	109.9	48	-44	-0.9	0
2021	Akron	7	5	0–5	109	157	69.4	1,262	8.0	10	0	158.0	43	49	1.1	0
2022	Georgia Tech	6	3	1–2	57	104	54.8	589	5.7	1	2	101.7	23	-14	-0.6	0
2023	Georgia Tech	0	0	—	DNP											
2024	Georgia State	7	4	0–4	102	151	67.5	1,004	6.6	7	2	136.1	43	53	1.2	1
2025	Florida Atlantic	6	0	—	31	53	58.5	323	5.7	3	3	117.0	2	3	1.5	0
Career		36	20	2–18	416	678	61.4	4,387	6.5	26	16	123.9	173	-25	-0.1	1
