= 2019 Ohio Bobcats football team =

American college football season

2019 Ohio Bobcats football

Famous Idaho Potato Bowl champion

Famous Idaho Potato Bowl, W 30−21 vs. Nevada
- Conference: Mid-American Conference
- East Division
- Record: 7–6 (5–3 MAC)
- Head coach: Frank Solich (15th season)
- Offensive coordinator: Tim Albin (15th season)
- Offensive scheme: Spread option
- Co-defensive coordinators: Ron Collins (3rd season); Pete Germano (1st season)
- Base defense: 4-3
- Captains: Will Evans; Michael Farkas; Javon Hagan; Cameron Odem; Austen Pleasants
- Home stadium: Peden Stadium

Uniform
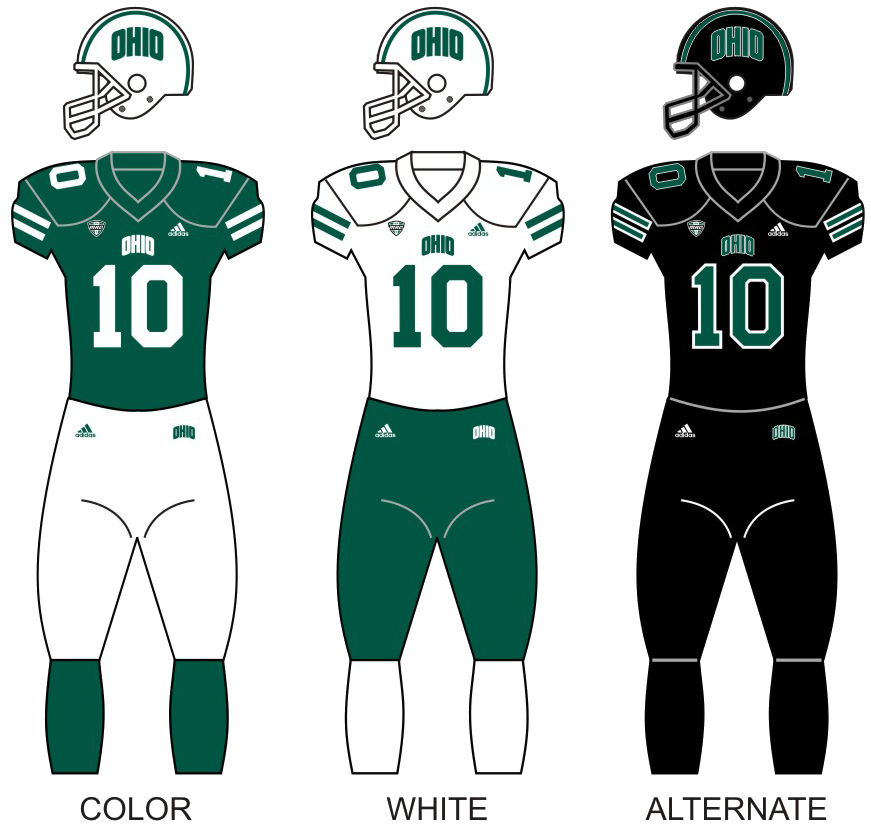

2019 Mid-American Conference football standings
	Conf.			Overall
Team	W		L	W		L
East Division
Miami (OH) x$	6	–	2	8	–	6
Ohio	5	–	3	7	–	6
Buffalo	5	–	3	8	–	5
Kent State	5	–	3	7	–	6
Bowling Green	2	–	6	3	–	9
Akron	0	–	8	0	–	12
West Division
Central Michigan x	6	–	2	8	–	6
Western Michigan	5	–	3	7	–	6
Ball State	4	–	4	5	–	7
Northern Illinois	4	–	4	5	–	7
Toledo	3	–	5	6	–	6
Eastern Michigan	3	–	5	6	–	7
Championship: Miami 26, Central Michigan 21
$ – Conference champion; x – Division champion/co-champions

The 2019 Ohio Bobcats football team represented Ohio University in the 2019 NCAA Division I FBS football season. They were led by 15th year head coach Frank Solich and played their home games at Peden Stadium in Athens, Ohio, as members of the East Division of the Mid-American Conference.

== Preseason ==
=== MAC media poll ===
The MAC released their preseason media poll on July 23, 2019, with the Bobcats predicted to finish in first place in the East Division. Ohio was also picked as the overall favorite to win the MAC Championship Game.

== Schedule ==
Date	Time	Opponent	Site	TV	Result	Attendance
August 31, 2019	2:00 p.m.	Rhode Island*	Peden Stadium; Athens, OH	ESPN+	W 41–20	16,665
September 7	11:00 a.m.	at Pittsburgh*	Heinz Field; Pittsburgh, PA	ACCN	L 10–20	42,168
September 14	6:30 p.m.	at Marshall*	Joan C. Edwards Stadium; Huntington, WV (Battle for the Bell)	Stadium Facebook	L 31–33	27,323
September 21	2:00 p.m.	Louisiana*	Peden Stadium; Athens, OH	ESPN+	L 25–45	17,416
October 5	3:30 p.m.	at Buffalo	University at Buffalo Stadium; Buffalo, NY	ESPN+	W 21–20 ^{OT}	20,042
October 12	3:30 p.m.	Northern Illinois^{†}	Peden Stadium; Athens, OH	ESPN+	L 36–39	18,019
October 19	12:00 p.m.	Kent State	Peden Stadium; Athens, OH	CBSSN	W 45–38	15,009
October 26	2:00 p.m.	at Ball State	Scheumann Stadium; Muncie, IN	ESPN+	W 34–21	5,572
November 6	8:00 p.m.	Miami (OH)‡	Peden Stadium; Athens, OH (Battle of the Bricks)	ESPN2	L 21–24	20,589
November 12	7:30 p.m.	Western Michigan	Peden Stadium; Athens, OH	ESPN2	L 34–37 ^{OT}	11,700
November 19	7:30 p.m.	at Bowling Green	Doyt Perry Stadium; Bowling Green, OH	ESPNU	W 66–24	9,715
November 26	6:00 p.m.	at Akron	InfoCision Stadium–Summa Field; Akron, OH	ESPN+	W 52–3	21,414
January 3, 2020	3:30 p.m.	vs. Nevada*	Albertsons Stadium; Boise, ID (Famous Idaho Potato Bowl)	ESPN	W 30−21	13,611
*Non-conference game; ^{†}Homecoming; All times are in Eastern time

‡CFB 150th anniversary game

== Personnel ==
=== Coaching staff ===
Since December 16, 2004, the head coach of the Ohio Bobcats has been Frank Solich. He heads a staff of ten assistant coaches, four graduate assistants, a director of football operations, and a director of player personnel. Jimmy Burrow, defensive coordinator since 2005, announcement retirement on February 5, 2019.

Name	Position	Year	Former Ohio positions held	Alma mater
Frank Solich	Head coach	2005		University of Nebraska 1966
Tim Albin	Associate head coach/ Co-offensive coordinator/running backs	2005		Northwestern Oklahoma State University 1989
Ron Collins	Defensive coordinator/safeties	2011	Linebackers 2011-2018	Washington State University 1987
Scott Isphording	Co-offensive coordinator/quarterbacks	2014	Tight ends/recruiting coordinator 2009	Hanover College 1994
Pete Germano	Co-defensive coordinator/defensive ends	2017	Tight ends/recruiting coordinator 2001-2002/2005-2008; Outside linebackers/recruiting coordinator 2003-2004; Defensive line 2009-2011	Ohio Wesleyan University 1982
Brian Haines	Special teams coordinator/tight ends/ Recruiting coordinator	2010	Offensive graduate assistant (WR) 2007–2008	Marietta College 2004
Dwayne Dixon	Wide receivers	2007		University of Florida 1985
DeAngelo Smith	Cornerbacks	2017		University of Cincinnati 2008
Tremayne Scott	Defensive tackles	2018	Defensive graduate assistant (DL) 2014-2015	Ohio University 2012
Allen Rudolph	Offensive line	2019		University of Southern Mississippi 1995
Nate Faanes	Linebackers	2019	Offensive Intern (RB) 2016; Defensive graduate assistant (LB) 2017-2018	Winona State University 2015
Chris Rodgers	Assistant Athletic Director For Football Operations	2014	Operations/recruiting Intern 2013; Director of Football Operations 2014-2016	Ohio University 2010
Ryan Bainbridge	Director of Player Personnel & HS Relations	2017	Operations/recruiting Intern 2015-2016	Ohio University 2014
Dak Notestine	Director of Strength & Conditioning	2014	Strength & Conditioning Graduate Assistant 2011; Assistant Strength & Conditioning Coach 2012-2013	Ohio University 2010

== Game summaries ==
=== Rhode Island ===
	1	2	3	4	Total
Rams	0	6	7	7	20
Bobcats	7	10	17	7	41

=== At Pittsburgh ===
	1	2	3	4	Total
Bobcats	0	3	7	0	10
Panthers	3	14	3	0	20

=== At Marshall ===
	1	2	3	4	Total
Bobcats	3	14	7	7	31
Thundering Herd	10	17	0	6	33

=== Louisiana ===
	1	2	3	4	Total
Ragin' Cajuns	7	3	14	21	45
Bobcats	0	6	6	13	25

=== At Buffalo ===
	1	2	3	4	OT	Total
Bobcats	0	0	7	7	7	21
Bulls	0	7	0	7	6	20

=== Northern Illinois ===
	1	2	3	4	Total
Huskies	10	0	12	17	39
Bobcats	7	14	0	15	36

=== Kent State ===
	1	2	3	4	Total
Golden Flashes	14	10	0	14	38
Bobcats	10	14	7	14	45

=== At Ball State ===
	1	2	3	4	Total
Bobcats	7	6	14	7	34
Cardinals	7	0	7	7	21

=== Miami (OH) ===
	1	2	3	4	Total
RedHawks	0	7	7	10	24
Bobcats	0	7	0	14	21

=== Western Michigan ===
	1	2	3	4	OT	Total
Broncos	3	7	7	14	6	37
Bobcats	0	0	14	17	3	34

=== At Bowling Green ===
	1	2	3	4	Total
Bobcats	24	14	28	0	66
Falcons	14	10	0	0	24

=== At Akron ===
	1	2	3	4	Total
Bobcats	14	17	7	14	52
Zips	3	0	0	0	3

=== Vs. Nevada (Famous Idaho Potato Bowl) ===
	1	2	3	4	Total
Bobcats	3	17	10	0	30
Wolf Pack	3	6	0	12	21
