= 2019 Western Michigan Broncos football team =

American college football season

2019 Western Michigan Broncos football

First Responder Bowl, L 20–23 vs. Western Kentucky
- Conference: Mid-American Conference
- West Division
- Record: 7–6 (5–3 MAC)
- Head coach: Tim Lester (3rd season)
- Offensive coordinator: Jake Moreland (3rd season)
- Offensive scheme: West Coast
- Defensive coordinator: Lou Esposito (3rd season)
- Base defense: 4–2–5
- Home stadium: Waldo Stadium

2019 Mid-American Conference football standings
	Conf.			Overall
Team	W		L	W		L
East Division
Miami (OH) x$	6	–	2	8	–	6
Ohio	5	–	3	7	–	6
Buffalo	5	–	3	8	–	5
Kent State	5	–	3	7	–	6
Bowling Green	2	–	6	3	–	9
Akron	0	–	8	0	–	12
West Division
Central Michigan x	6	–	2	8	–	6
Western Michigan	5	–	3	7	–	6
Ball State	4	–	4	5	–	7
Northern Illinois	4	–	4	5	–	7
Toledo	3	–	5	6	–	6
Eastern Michigan	3	–	5	6	–	7
Championship: Miami 26, Central Michigan 21
$ – Conference champion; x – Division champion/co-champions

The 2019 Western Michigan Broncos football team represented Western Michigan University in the 2019 NCAA Division I FBS football season. The Broncos played their home games at Waldo Stadium in Kalamazoo, Michigan, and competed in the West Division of the Mid-American Conference. The team was led by third-year head coach Tim Lester.

== Preseason ==
=== Recruiting ===
College recruiting information (2019)
Name	Hometown	School	Height	Weight	Commit date
Demari Roberson; WR	Muskegon, Michigan	Mona Shores High School	6 ft 1 in (1.85 m)	180 lb (82 kg)	
Demari Roberson; WR	Recruit ratings: Scout: Rivals: 247Sports: ESPN:				
Ali'Vonta Wallace; LB	Muskegon, Michigan	Muskegon High School	6 ft 1 in (1.85 m)	210 lb (95 kg)	
Ali'Vonta Wallace; LB	Recruit ratings: Scout: Rivals: 247Sports: ESPN:				
Stuart Kettler; OT	East Grand Rapids, Michigan	East Grand Rapids High School	6 ft 5 in (1.96 m)	280 lb (130 kg)	
Stuart Kettler; OT	Recruit ratings: Scout: Rivals: 247Sports: ESPN:				
Addison West; OG	Cary, Illinois	Cary-Grove High School	6 ft 2 in (1.88 m)	280 lb (130 kg)	Jun 9, 2018
Addison West; OG	Recruit ratings: Rivals: 247Sports:				
Overall recruit ranking:
Note: In many cases, Scout, Rivals, 247Sports, On3, and ESPN may conflict in their listings of height and weight.; In these cases, the average was taken. ESPN grades are on a 100-point scale.; Sources:

=== MAC media poll ===
The MAC released their preseason media poll on July 23, 2019, with the Broncos predicted to finish in second place in the West Division.

== Schedule ==
The following table lists WMU's schedule.

Date	Time	Opponent	Site	TV	Result	Attendance
August 31	7:00 p.m.	Monmouth*	Waldo Stadium; Kalamazoo, MI	ESPN3	W 48–13	15,021
September 7	7:30 p.m.	at No. 19 Michigan State*	Spartan Stadium; East Lansing, MI	BTN	L 17–51	73,113
September 14	7:00 p.m.	Georgia State*	Waldo Stadium; Kalamazoo, MI	ESPN+	W 57–10	22,328
September 21	12:00 p.m.	at Syracuse*	Carrier Dome; Syracuse, NY	ACCN	L 33–52	40,700
September 28	12:00 p.m.	Central Michigan	Waldo Stadium; Kalamazoo, MI (Victory Cannon / Michigan MAC Trophy)	CBSSN	W 31–15	20,476
October 5	3:30 p.m.	at Toledo	Glass Bowl; Toledo, OH	ESPN+	L 24–31	22,141
October 12	12:00 p.m.	Miami (OH)^{†}	Waldo Stadium; Kalamazoo, MI	ESPNU	W 38–16	21,702
October 19	7:00 p.m.	at Eastern Michigan	Rynearson Stadium; Ypsilanti, MI (Michigan MAC Trophy)	ESPN+	L 27–34	20,528
October 26	12:00 p.m.	Bowling Green	Waldo Stadium; Kalamazoo, MI	ESPN3	W 49–10	16,778
November 5	8:00 p.m.	Ball State	Waldo Stadium; Kalamazoo, MI	ESPN2	W 35–31	11,314
November 12	6:30 p.m.	at Ohio	Peden Stadium; Athens, OH	ESPN2	W 37–34 ^{OT}	11,700
November 26	7:00 p.m.	at Northern Illinois	Huskie Stadium; DeKalb, IL	ESPNU	L 14–17	3,568
December 30	12:30 p.m.	vs. Western Kentucky	Gerald J. Ford Stadium; Dallas, TX (First Responder Bowl)	ESPN	L 20–23	13,164
*Non-conference game; ^{†}Homecoming; Rankings from AP Poll and CFP Rankings after November 5 released prior to game; All times are in Eastern time

== Game summaries ==
=== Monmouth ===
	1	2	3	4	Total
Hawks	0	7	6	0	13
Broncos	21	10	14	3	48

=== At Michigan State ===
	1	2	3	4	Total
Broncos	0	7	0	10	17
No. 19 Spartans	21	10	6	14	51

=== Georgia State ===
	1	2	3	4	Total
Panthers	10	0	0	0	10
Broncos	24	19	14	0	57

=== At Syracuse ===
	1	2	3	4	Total
Broncos	0	13	20	0	33
Orange	14	10	14	14	52

=== Central Michigan ===
	1	2	3	4	Total
Chippewas	0	0	0	15	15
Broncos	10	7	7	7	31

=== At Toledo ===
	1	2	3	4	Total
Broncos	7	0	10	7	24
Rockets	14	10	0	7	31

=== Miami (OH) ===
	1	2	3	4	Total
RedHawks	6	0	3	7	16
Broncos	0	21	0	17	38

=== At Eastern Michigan ===
	1	2	3	4	Total
Broncos	7	7	7	6	27
Eagles	3	7	10	14	34

=== Bowling Green ===
	1	2	3	4	Total
Falcons	3	0	7	0	10
Broncos	0	21	28	0	49

=== Ball State ===
	1	2	3	4	Total
Cardinals	7	3	7	14	31
Broncos	7	14	0	14	35

=== At Ohio ===
	1	2	3	4	OT	Total
Broncos	3	7	7	14	6	37
Bobcats	0	0	14	17	3	34

=== At Northern Illinois ===
	1	2	3	4	Total
Broncos	0	0	7	7	14
Huskies	3	7	0	7	17

=== Vs. Western Kentucky (First Responder Bowl) ===
	1	2	3	4	Total
Broncos	3	7	7	3	20
Hilltoppers	0	10	0	13	23
