= 2019 Central Michigan Chippewas football team =

American college football season

2019 Central Michigan Chippewas football

MAC West Division champion

MAC Championship Game, L 21–26 vs. Miami (OH)

New Mexico Bowl, L 11–48 vs. San Diego State
- Conference: Mid-American Conference
- West Division
- Record: 8–6 (6–2 MAC)
- Head coach: Jim McElwain (1st season)
- Offensive coordinator: Charlie Frye (1st season)
- Offensive scheme: Spread
- Defensive coordinator: Robb Akey (1st season)
- Base defense: 4–3
- Home stadium: Kelly/Shorts Stadium

Uniform
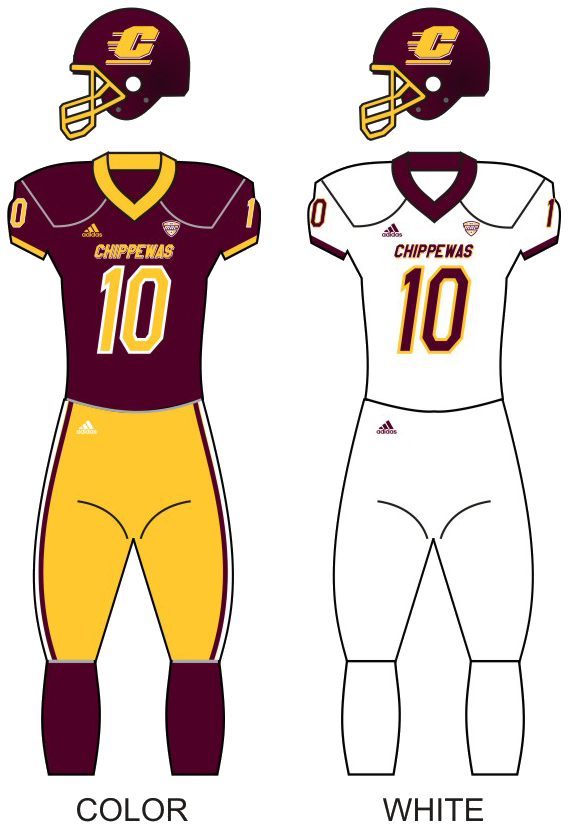

2019 Mid-American Conference football standings
	Conf.			Overall
Team	W		L	W		L
East Division
Miami (OH) x$	6	–	2	8	–	6
Ohio	5	–	3	7	–	6
Buffalo	5	–	3	8	–	5
Kent State	5	–	3	7	–	6
Bowling Green	2	–	6	3	–	9
Akron	0	–	8	0	–	12
West Division
Central Michigan x	6	–	2	8	–	6
Western Michigan	5	–	3	7	–	6
Ball State	4	–	4	5	–	7
Northern Illinois	4	–	4	5	–	7
Toledo	3	–	5	6	–	6
Eastern Michigan	3	–	5	6	–	7
Championship: Miami 26, Central Michigan 21
$ – Conference champion; x – Division champion/co-champions

The 2019 Central Michigan Chippewas football team represented Central Michigan University in the 2019 NCAA Division I FBS football season. They were led by first-year head coach Jim McElwain and played their home games at Kelly/Shorts Stadium as members of the West Division of the Mid-American Conference.

== Offseason ==
=== Coaching changes ===
The 2018 team finished the season going 1–11, the worst season in program history; head coach John Bonamego was fired on November 23 following the team's regular season finale. On December 2, the university announced that Michigan wide receivers coach Jim McElwain had been hired as the program's 29th head coach. Prior to his time at Michigan, McElwain also served as the head coach for Colorado State and Florida.

== Preseason ==
=== MAC media poll ===
The MAC released their preseason media poll on July 23, 2019, with the Chippewas predicted to finish in sixth place in the West Division.

== Schedule ==
Date	Time	Opponent	Site	TV	Result	Attendance
August 29	7:00 p.m.	Albany*	Kelly/Shorts Stadium; Mount Pleasant, MI	ESPN3	W 38–21	12,207
September 7	3:30 p.m.	at No. 17 Wisconsin*	Camp Randall Stadium; Madison, WI	BTN	L 0–61	74,437
September 14	3:00 p.m.	Akron	Kelly/Shorts Stadium; Mount Pleasant, MI	ESPN+	W 45–24	18,641
September 21	4:00 p.m.	at Miami (FL)*	Hard Rock Stadium; Miami Gardens, FL	ACCN	L 12–17	49,997
September 28	12:00 p.m.	at Western Michigan	Waldo Stadium; Kalamazoo, MI (rivalry)	CBSSN	L 15–31	20,476
October 5	3:30 p.m.	Eastern Michigan	Kelly/Shorts Stadium; Mount Pleasant, MI (rivalry)	ESPN+	W 42–16	15,235
October 12	3:00 p.m.	New Mexico State*^{†}	Kelly/Shorts Stadium; Mount Pleasant, MI	ESPN3	W 42–28	15,764
October 19	3:00 p.m.	at Bowling Green	Doyt Perry Stadium; Bowling Green, OH	ESPN3	W 38–20	15,000
October 26	3:30 p.m.	at Buffalo	University at Buffalo Stadium; Amherst, NY	ESPN+	L 20–43	14,850
November 2	12:00 p.m.	Northern Illinois	Kelly/Shorts Stadium; Mount Pleasant, MI	CBSSN	W 48–10	10,438
November 16	3:30 p.m.	at Ball State	Scheumann Stadium; Muncie, IN	CBSSN	W 45–44	7,249
November 29	12:00 p.m.	Toledo	Kelly/Shorts Stadium; Mount Pleasant, MI	ESPNU	W 49–7	9,101
December 7	12:00 p.m.	vs. Miami (OH)	Ford Field; Detroit, MI (MAC Championship Game)	ESPN2	L 21–26	22,427
December 21	2:00 p.m.	vs. San Diego State*	Dreamstyle Stadium; Albuquerque, NM (New Mexico Bowl)	ESPN	L 11–48	18,823
*Non-conference game; ^{†}Homecoming; Rankings from AP Poll and CFP Rankings after November 5 released prior to game; All times are in Eastern time

== Game summaries ==
=== Albany ===
	1	2	3	4	Total
Great Danes	0	7	7	7	21
Chippewas	7	17	7	7	38

Statistics	ALB	CMU
First downs	13	31
Total yards	244	529
Rushing yards	45	244
Passing yards	199	285
Turnovers	1	3
Time of possession	23:22	36:38

Team	Category	Player	Statistics
Albany	Passing	Jeff Undercuffer Jr.	15/28, 199 yards, 2 TD
Albany	Rushing	Karl Mofor	16 rushes, 45 yards
Albany	Receiving	Juwan Green	5 receptions, 94 yards, 2 TD
Central Michigan	Passing	Quinten Dormady	27/37, 285 yards, 3 TD
Central Michigan	Rushing	Jonathan Ward	22 rushes, 158 yards, 2 TD
Central Michigan	Receiving	Ty Scott	5 receptions, 93 yards, 2 TD

=== At No. 17 Wisconsin ===
	1	2	3	4	Total
Chippewas	0	0	0	0	0
No. 17 Badgers	16	28	10	7	61

Statistics	CMU	WIS
First downs	3	37
Total yards	58	599
Rushing yards	15	199
Passing yards	43	400
Turnovers	1	1
Time of possession	20:33	39:27

Team	Category	Player	Statistics
Central Michigan	Passing	Quinten Dormady	5/12, 36 yards, INT
Central Michigan	Rushing	Tommy Lazzaro	4 rushes, 11 yards
Central Michigan	Receiving	Kalil Pimpleton	3 receptions, 18 yards
Wisconsin	Passing	Jack Coan	26/33, 363 yards, 3 TD
Wisconsin	Rushing	Jonathan Taylor	19 rushes, 102 yards, 3 TD
Wisconsin	Receiving	Quintez Cephus	6 receptions, 130 yards, 2 TD

=== Akron ===
	1	2	3	4	Total
Zips	0	10	0	14	24
Chippewas	3	24	3	15	45

Statistics	AKR	CMU
First downs	16	21
Total yards	326	533
Rushing yards	42	189
Passing yards	284	344
Turnovers	2	1
Time of possession	31:10	28:50

Team	Category	Player	Statistics
Akron Zips	Passing	Kato Nelson	25/41, 243 yards, 3 TD, INT
Akron Zips	Rushing	Kato Nelson	16 rushes, 28 yards
Akron Zips	Receiving	Nate Stewart	5 receptions, 78 yards, TD
Central Michigan	Passing	David Moore	20/31, 316 yards, 2 TD
Central Michigan	Rushing	Kobe Lewis	27 rushes, 146 yards, 3 TD
Central Michigan	Receiving	Kalil Pimpleton	7 receptions, 116 yards, TD

=== At Miami (FL) ===
	1	2	3	4	Total
Chippewas	0	2	3	7	12
Hurricanes	7	0	7	3	17

Statistics	CMU	MIA
First downs	21	16
Total yards	248	301
Rushing yards	31	51
Passing yards	217	250
Turnovers	3	1
Time of possession	32:46	27:14

Team	Category	Player	Statistics
Central Michigan	Passing	David Moore	23/50, 217 yards, INT
Central Michigan	Rushing	Kobe Lewis	15 rushes, 45 yards
Central Michigan	Receiving	Kalil Pimpleton	11 receptions, 73 yards
Miami (FL)	Passing	Jarren Williams	17/24, 250 yards, TD
Miami (FL)	Rushing	DeeJay Dallas	14 rushes, 34 yards, TD
Miami (FL)	Receiving	Brevin Jordan	3 receptions, 70 yards

=== At Western Michigan ===
	1	2	3	4	Total
Chippewas	0	0	0	15	15
Broncos	10	7	7	7	31

Statistics	CMU	WMU
First downs	31	22
Total yards	437	432
Rushing yards	107	188
Passing yards	330	244
Turnovers	3	1
Time of possession	28:30	31:30

Team	Category	Player	Statistics
Central Michigan	Passing	David Moore	33/48, 330 yards, TD, 2 INT
Central Michigan	Rushing	Jonathan Ward	19 rushes, 107 yards
Central Michigan	Receiving	Ty Scott	6 receptions, 81 yards
Western Michigan	Passing	Jon Wassink	18/29, 244 yards, TD, INT
Western Michigan	Rushing	LeVante Bellamy	25 rushes, 105 yards, TD
Western Michigan	Receiving	Skyy Moore	4 receptions, 67 yards

=== Eastern Michigan ===
	1	2	3	4	Total
Eagles	3	0	7	6	16
Chippewas	7	14	14	7	42

Statistics	EMU	CMU
First downs	22	24
Total yards	285	587
Rushing yards	63	308
Passing yards	222	279
Turnovers	1	2
Time of possession	27:48	32:12

Team	Category	Player	Statistics
Eastern Michigan	Passing	Mike Glass III	20/34, 207 yards, TD, INT
Eastern Michigan	Rushing	Willie Parker	8 rushes, 29 yards
Eastern Michigan	Receiving	Mathew Sexton	5 receptions, 56 yards, TD
Central Michigan	Passing	David Moore	15/24, 279 yards, 2 TD, INT
Central Michigan	Rushing	Jonathan Ward	12 rushes, 132 yards, 2 TD
Central Michigan	Receiving	Kalil Pimpleton	5 receptions, 112 yards, TD

=== New Mexico State ===
	1	2	3	4	Total
Aggies	7	14	0	7	28
Chippewas	14	14	6	8	42

Statistics	NMSU	CMU
First downs	18	22
Total yards	384	486
Rushing yards	121	352
Passing yards	263	134
Turnovers	2	1
Time of possession	24:59	35:01

Team	Category	Player	Statistics
New Mexico State	Passing	Josh Adkins	24/40, 263 yards, 3 TD, INT
New Mexico State	Rushing	Jason Huntley	10 rushes, 67 yards, TD
New Mexico State	Receiving	Tony Nicholson	7 receptions, 86 yards
Central Michigan	Passing	Quinten Dormady	14/24, 134 yards, 2 TD
Central Michigan	Rushing	Kobe Lewis	23 rushes, 161 yards, 2 TD
Central Michigan	Receiving	Kalil Pimpleton	6 receptions, 59 yards, TD

=== At Bowling Green ===
	1	2	3	4	Total
Chippewas	7	14	7	10	38
Falcons	7	0	7	6	20

Statistics	CMU	BGSU
First downs	26	19
Total yards	553	344
Rushing yards	254	178
Passing yards	299	166
Turnovers	2	3
Time of possession	35:25	24:35

Team	Category	Player	Statistics
Central Michigan	Passing	Quinten Dormady	22/36, 295 yards, TD, INT
Central Michigan	Rushing	Jonathan Ward	21 rushes, 130 yards, 3 TD
Central Michigan	Receiving	JaCorey Sullivan	8 receptions, 126 yards, TD
Bowling Green	Passing	Grant Loy	13/29, 166 yards, TD, 3 INT
Bowling Green	Rushing	Grant Loy	18 rushes, 67 yards, TD
Bowling Green	Receiving	Quintin Morris	4 receptions, 69 yards

=== At Buffalo ===
	1	2	3	4	Total
Chippewas	7	7	0	6	20
Bulls	3	27	3	10	43

Statistics	CMU	BUFF
First downs		
Total yards		
Rushing yards		
Passing yards		
Turnovers		
Time of possession		

Team	Category	Player	Statistics
Central Michigan	Passing		
Central Michigan	Rushing		
Central Michigan	Receiving		
Buffalo	Passing		
Buffalo	Rushing		
Buffalo	Receiving		

=== Northern Illinois ===
	1	2	3	4	Total
Huskies	3	7	0	0	10
Chippewas	21	17	0	10	48

Statistics	NIU	CMU
First downs		
Total yards		
Rushing yards		
Passing yards		
Turnovers		
Time of possession		

Team	Category	Player	Statistics
Northern Illinois	Passing		
Northern Illinois	Rushing		
Northern Illinois	Receiving		
Central Michigan	Passing		
Central Michigan	Rushing		
Central Michigan	Receiving		

=== At Ball State ===
	1	2	3	4	Total
Chippewas	3	8	20	14	45
Cardinals	3	24	14	3	44

Statistics	CMU	BALL
First downs		
Total yards		
Rushing yards		
Passing yards		
Turnovers		
Time of possession		

Team	Category	Player	Statistics
Central Michigan	Passing		
Central Michigan	Rushing		
Central Michigan	Receiving		
Ball State	Passing		
Ball State	Rushing		
Ball State	Receiving		

=== Toledo ===
	1	2	3	4	Total
Rockets	0	7	0	0	7
Chippewas	14	21	7	7	49

Statistics	TOL	CMU
First downs		
Total yards		
Rushing yards		
Passing yards		
Turnovers		
Time of possession		

Team	Category	Player	Statistics
Toledo	Passing		
Toledo	Rushing		
Toledo	Receiving		
Central Michigan	Passing		
Central Michigan	Rushing		
Central Michigan	Receiving		

=== Vs. Miami (OH)–MAC Championship Game ===
	1	2	3	4	Total
RedHawks	7	3	7	9	26
Chippewas	0	14	0	7	21

Statistics	MOH	CMU
First downs	15	20
Total yards	272	355
Rushing yards	76	99
Passing yards	196	256
Turnovers	0	1
Time of possession	30:05	29:55

Team	Category	Player	Statistics
Miami (OH)	Passing	Brett Gabbert	14/27, 196 yards, TD
Miami (OH)	Rushing	Jaylon Bester	20 rushes, 66 yards, TD
Miami (OH)	Receiving	Jack Sorenson	8 receptions, 123 yards, TD
Central Michigan	Passing	Quinten Dormady	26/41, 232 yards, TD, INT
Central Michigan	Rushing	Tommy Lazzaro	6 rushes, 48 yards, 2 TD
Central Michigan	Receiving	JaCorey Sullivan	7 receptions, 64 yards

=== Vs. San Diego State (New Mexico Bowl) ===
	1	2	3	4	Total
Chippewas	3	0	8	0	11
Aztecs	7	13	21	7	48

Statistics	CMU	SDSU
First downs	7	24
Total yards	277	510
Rushing yards	112	223
Passing yards	165	287
Turnovers	5	1
Time of possession	21:41	38:19

Team	Category	Player	Statistics
Central Michigan	Passing	Quinten Dormady	11/26, 164 yards, 3 INT
Central Michigan	Rushing	Kobe Lewis	5 rushes, 97 yards, TD
Central Michigan	Receiving	Kalil Pimpleton	3 receptions, 71 yards
San Diego State	Passing	Ryan Agnew	18/31, 287 yards, 3 TD, INT
San Diego State	Rushing	Jordan Byrd	17 rushes, 139 yards, TD
San Diego State	Receiving	Jesse Matthews	3 receptions, 111 yards, 2 TD
