= 2019 Kent State Golden Flashes football team =

American college football season

2019 Kent State Golden Flashes football

Frisco Bowl champion

Frisco Bowl, W 51–41 vs. Utah State
- Conference: Mid-American Conference
- East Division
- Record: 7–6 (5–3 MAC)
- Head coach: Sean Lewis (2nd season)
- Offensive coordinator: Andrew Sowder (2nd season)
- Offensive scheme: Veer and shoot
- Defensive coordinator: Tom Kaufman (2nd season)
- Base defense: 3–4
- Home stadium: Dix Stadium

Uniform
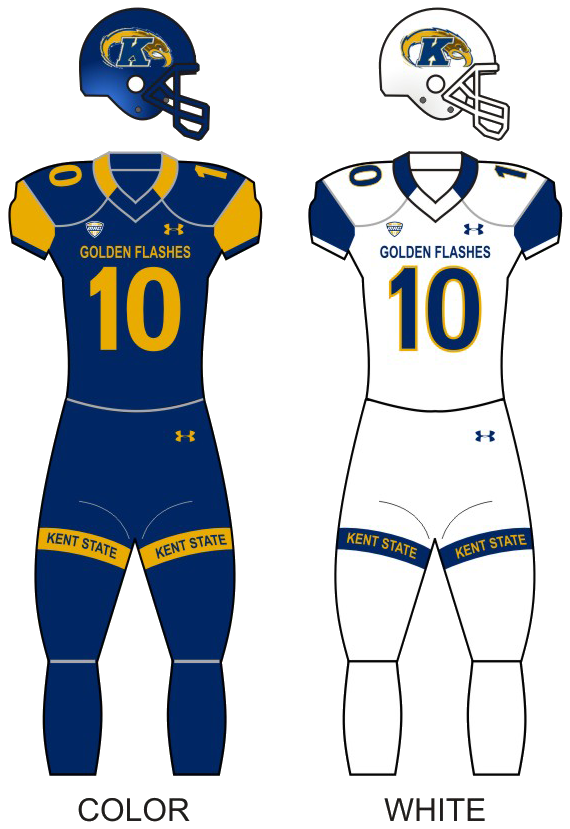

2019 Mid-American Conference football standings
	Conf.			Overall
Team	W		L	W		L
East Division
Miami (OH) x$	6	–	2	8	–	6
Ohio	5	–	3	7	–	6
Buffalo	5	–	3	8	–	5
Kent State	5	–	3	7	–	6
Bowling Green	2	–	6	3	–	9
Akron	0	–	8	0	–	12
West Division
Central Michigan x	6	–	2	8	–	6
Western Michigan	5	–	3	7	–	6
Ball State	4	–	4	5	–	7
Northern Illinois	4	–	4	5	–	7
Toledo	3	–	5	6	–	6
Eastern Michigan	3	–	5	6	–	7
Championship: Miami 26, Central Michigan 21
$ – Conference champion; x – Division champion/co-champions

The 2019 Kent State Golden Flashes football team represented Kent State University in the 2019 NCAA Division I FBS football season. They were led by second-year head coach Sean Lewis and played their home games at Dix Stadium in Kent, Ohio, as members of the East Division of the Mid-American Conference.

Trailing 6–27 in the fourth quarter against Buffalo with a 3–6 record, Kent State proceeded to score 24 unanswered points in the last eight minutes of the game to win 30–27, and later followed that victory with two additional wins to reach bowl eligibility for the first time since 2012. Kent State were then invited to the Frisco Bowl where they defeated Utah State with a 51–41 score. To date, this is the last full-season the Golden Flashes would finish with a winning record.

== Preseason ==
=== MAC media poll ===
The MAC released their preseason media poll on July 23, 2019, with the Golden Flashes predicted to finish in fourth place in the East Division.

== Schedule ==
Date	Time	Opponent	Site	TV	Result	Attendance
August 29	10:00 p.m.	at Arizona State*	Sun Devil Stadium; Tempe, AZ	P12N	L 7–30	47,413
September 7	12:00 p.m.	No. 9 (FCS) Kennesaw State*	Dix Stadium; Kent, OH	ESPN3	W 26–23 ^{OT}	18,679
September 14	7:00 p.m.	at No. 8 Auburn*	Jordan–Hare Stadium; Auburn, AL	ESPN2	L 16–55	84,542
September 21	3:30 p.m.	Bowling Green^{†}	Dix Stadium; Kent, OH (Anniversary Award)	ESPN3	W 62–20	19,700
October 5	11:00 a.m.	at No. 8 Wisconsin*	Camp Randall Stadium; Madison, WI	ESPNU	L 0–48	74,559
October 12	3:30 p.m.	at Akron	InfoCision Stadium; Akron, OH (Wagon Wheel)	ESPN3	W 26–3	22,692
October 19	12:00 p.m.	at Ohio	Peden Stadium; Athens, OH	CBSSN	L 38–45	15,009
October 26	3:30 p.m.	Miami (OH)	Dix Stadium; Kent, OH	ESPN+	L 16–23	8,455
November 5	7:00 p.m.	at Toledo	Glass Bowl; Toledo, OH	CBSSN	L 33–35	16,331
November 14	7:00 p.m.	Buffalo	Dix Stadium; Kent, OH	CBSSN	W 30–27	8,450
November 23	12:00 p.m.	Ball State	Dix Stadium; Kent, OH	ESPN+	W 41–38	8,825
November 29	12:00 p.m.	at Eastern Michigan	Rynearson Stadium; Ypsilanti, MI	ESPN+	W 34–26	13,444
December 20	7:30 p.m.	vs. Utah State*	Toyota Stadium; Frisco, TX (Frisco Bowl)	ESPN2	W 51–41	12,120
*Non-conference game; ^{†}Homecoming; Rankings from AP Poll and CFP Rankings after November 5 released prior to game; All times are in Eastern time

== Game summaries ==
=== At Arizona State ===
	1	2	3	4	Total
Golden Flashes	0	0	0	7	7
Sun Devils	10	0	17	3	30

=== Kennesaw State ===
	1	2	3	4	OT	Total
No. 9 (FCS) Owls	3	13	0	7	0	23
Golden Flashes	3	7	7	6	3	26

=== At No. 8 Auburn ===
Kent State Golden Flashes at No. 8 Auburn Tigers – Game summary

Quarter	1	2	3	4	Total
Golden Flashes	3	7	0	6	16
No. 8 Tigers	14	10	14	17	55

at Jordan–Hare Stadium • Auburn, Alabama

- Date: September 14, 2019
- Game time: 7:05 p.m. EST
- Game weather: Temperature: 88° • Wind: NE 9 mph • Weather: Partly Cloudy
- Game attendance: 84,542
- Referee: David Smith
- TV announcers (ESPN2): Anish Shroff (play-by-play), Ahmad Brooks (analyst), Kris Budden (sideline reporter)

Game information

First Quarter

- KSU – Matthew Trickett 21 yd field goal, 8:42 (KSU 3–0)
- AUB – JaTarvious Whitlow 3 yd run (Anders Carlson kick), 5:47 (AUB 7–3)
- AUB – Kam Martin 35 yd run (Anders Carlson kick), 0:11 (AUB 14–3)

Second Quarter

- KSU – Isaiah McCoy 53 yd pass from Dustin Crum (Matthew Trickett kick), 10:47 (AUB 14–10)
- AUB – Bo Nix 1 yd run (Anders Carlson kick), 8:16 (AUB 21–10)
- AUB – Anders Carlson 45 yd field goal, 0:00 (AUB 24–10)

Third Quarter

- AUB – JaTarvious Whitlow 16 yd run (Anders Carlson kick), 12:02 (AUB 31–10)
- AUB – Eli Stove 49 yd pass from Bo Nix (Anders Carlson kick), 5:59 (AUB 38–10)

Fourth Quarter

- AUB – Anders Carlson 37 yd field goal, 14:55 (AUB 41–10)
- KSU – Kavious Price 15 yd pass from Woody Barrett (2 pt conversion failed), 12:36 (KSU 41–16)
- AUB – Joey Gatewood 2 yd run (Sage Ledbetter kick), 8:49 (AUB 48–16)
- AUB – Joey Gatewood 2 yd run (Sage Ledbetter kick), 2:27 (AUB 55–16)

Top Passers

- KSU – Dustin Crum – 15–24, 198 yds, 1 TD
- AUB – Bo Nix – 12–16, 161 yds, 1 TD

Top Rushers

- KSU – Dustin Crum – 11 rushes, 30 yds
- AUB – JaTarvious Whitlow – 17 rushes, 135 yds, 2 TD

Top Receivers

- KSU – Isaiah McCoy – 4 receptions, 85 yds, 1 TD
- AUB – Eli Stove – 6 receptions, 88 yds, 1 TD

=== Bowling Green ===
	1	2	3	4	Total
Falcons	7	0	0	13	20
Golden Flashes	21	3	17	21	62

=== At No. 8 Wisconsin ===
	1	2	3	4	Total
Golden Flashes	0	0	0	0	0
No. 8 Badgers	7	21	13	7	48

=== At Akron ===
	1	2	3	4	Total
Golden Flashes	7	10	0	9	26
Zips	0	3	0	0	3

=== At Ohio ===
	1	2	3	4	Total
Golden Flashes	14	10	0	14	38
Bobcats	10	14	7	14	45

=== Miami (OH) ===
	1	2	3	4	Total
RedHawks	6	3	7	7	23
Golden Flashes	0	6	0	10	16

=== At Toledo ===
	1	2	3	4	Total
Golden Flashes	10	7	10	6	33
Rockets	14	14	0	7	35

=== Buffalo ===
	1	2	3	4	Total
Bulls	7	10	7	3	27
Golden Flashes	0	6	0	24	30

=== Ball State ===
	1	2	3	4	Total
Cardinals	7	17	0	14	38
Golden Flashes	7	14	10	10	41

=== At Eastern Michigan ===
	1	2	3	4	Total
Golden Flashes	14	10	7	3	34
Eagles	7	7	6	6	26

=== Vs. Utah State (Frisco Bowl) ===
	1	2	3	4	Total
Golden Flashes	17	6	3	25	51
Aggies	10	7	10	14	41
