= 2019 Bowling Green Falcons football team =

American college football season

2019 Bowling Green Falcons football
- Conference: Mid-American Conference
- East Division
- Record: 3–9 (2–6 MAC)
- Head coach: Scot Loeffler (1st season)
- Offensive coordinator: Terry Malone (1st season)
- Offensive scheme: Multiple
- Defensive coordinator: Brian VanGorder (1st season)
- Base defense: 4–3
- Home stadium: Doyt Perry Stadium

2019 Mid-American Conference football standings
	Conf.			Overall
Team	W		L	W		L
East Division
Miami (OH) x$	6	–	2	8	–	6
Ohio	5	–	3	7	–	6
Buffalo	5	–	3	8	–	5
Kent State	5	–	3	7	–	6
Bowling Green	2	–	6	3	–	9
Akron	0	–	8	0	–	12
West Division
Central Michigan x	6	–	2	8	–	6
Western Michigan	5	–	3	7	–	6
Ball State	4	–	4	5	–	7
Northern Illinois	4	–	4	5	–	7
Toledo	3	–	5	6	–	6
Eastern Michigan	3	–	5	6	–	7
Championship: Miami 26, Central Michigan 21
$ – Conference champion; x – Division champion/co-champions

The 2019 Bowling Green Falcons football team represented Bowling Green State University during the 2019 NCAA Division I FBS football season. The Falcons were led by first-year head coach Scot Loeffler and played their home games at Doyt Perry Stadium in Bowling Green, Ohio. They competed as members of the East Division of the Mid-American Conference (MAC).

== Preseason ==
=== Coaching changes ===
Seven games into the 2018 season, Bowling Green fired third-year head coach Mike Jinks; defensive coordinator Carl Pelini served as interim head coach for the remainder of the season. On November 28, 2018, the school announced that Scot Loeffler had been hired to become the new head coach. Loeffler had spent the previous three seasons as the offensive coordinator and quarterbacks coach at Boston College. On December 4, Loeffler announced that he would retain Pelini as defensive coordinator and hired former Western Michigan tight ends coach Terry Malone to be the new offensive coordinator. On December 10, former Louisville defensive coordinator Brian VanGorder was announced as the new linebackers coach. He was promoted to defensive coordinator in February 2019 after Carl Pelini left to pursue other opportunities.

=== MAC media poll ===
The MAC released their preseason media poll on July 23, 2019, with the Falcons predicted to finish in sixth place in the East Division.

== Schedule ==
Date	Time	Opponent	Site	TV	Result	Attendance
August 29	7:00 p.m.	Morgan State*	Doyt Perry Stadium; Bowling Green, OH	ESPN3	W 46–3	17,620
September 7	12:00 p.m.	at Kansas State*	Bill Snyder Family Football Stadium; Manhattan, KS	FSN	L 0–52	46,075
September 14	5:00 p.m.	Louisiana Tech*^{†}	Doyt Perry Stadium; Bowling Green, OH	ESPN+	L 7–35	18,021
September 21	3:30 p.m.	at Kent State	Dix Stadium; Kent, OH (Anniversary Award)	ESPN3	L 20–62	19,700
October 5	3:30 p.m.	at No. 9 Notre Dame*	Notre Dame Stadium; Notre Dame, IN	NBC	L 0–52	77,622
October 12	12:00 p.m.	Toledo	Doyt Perry Stadium; Bowling Green, OH (rivalry)	CBSSN	W 20–7	19,199
October 19	2:00 p.m.	Central Michigan	Doyt Perry Stadium; Bowling Green, OH	ESPN3	L 20–38	15,000
October 26	12:00 p.m.	at Western Michigan	Waldo Stadium; Kalamazoo, MI	ESPN3	L 10–49	16,778
November 2	2:00 p.m.	Akron	Doyt Perry Stadium; Bowling Green, OH	ESPN+	W 35–6	12,113
November 13	8:00 p.m.	at Miami (OH)	Yager Stadium; Oxford, OH	ESPNU	L 3–44	19,897
November 19	7:30 p.m.	Ohio	Doyt Perry Stadium; Bowling Green, OH	ESPNU	L 24–66	9,715
November 29	12:00 p.m.	at Buffalo	University at Buffalo Stadium; Amherst, NY	ESPN+	L 7–49	13,749
*Non-conference game; ^{†}Homecoming; Rankings from AP Poll and CFP Rankings after November 5 released prior to game; All times are in Eastern time

== Game summaries ==
=== Morgan State ===
	1	2	3	4	Total
Bears	0	3	0	0	3
Falcons	13	17	7	9	46

=== At Kansas State ===
	1	2	3	4	Total
Falcons	0	0	0	0	0
Wildcats	17	21	7	7	52

Bowling Green managed 140 total yards (79 passing and 61 rushing) and completed just 8 of 19 passes. Kansas State led 31-0 and put up over 300 yards of total offense before the game was halfway through the second quarter. Kansas State ended up with 521 total yards by the end of the game and the final score was Kansas State 52, Bowling Green 0. The shutout was Bowling Green’s first since losing 37-0 at Virginia Tech in 2012.

=== Louisiana Tech ===
	1	2	3	4	Total
Bulldogs	14	7	0	14	35
Falcons	7	0	0	0	7

=== At Kent State ===
	1	2	3	4	Total
Falcons	7	0	0	13	20
Golden Flashes	21	3	17	21	62

=== At Notre Dame ===
	1	2	3	4	Total
Falcons	0	0	0	0	0
No. 9 Fighting Irish	21	14	10	7	52

=== Toledo ===
	1	2	3	4	Total
Rockets	0	7	0	0	7
Falcons	10	7	3	0	20

Bowling Green broke their 9-year drought with their first victory in the Battle of I-75 rivalry since 2009.

=== Central Michigan ===
	1	2	3	4	Total
Chippewas	7	14	7	10	38
Falcons	7	0	7	6	20

=== At Western Michigan ===
	1	2	3	4	Total
Falcons	3	0	7	0	10
Broncos	0	21	28	0	49

=== Akron ===
	1	2	3	4	Total
Zips	6	0	0	0	6
Falcons	7	14	7	7	35

=== At Miami (OH) ===
	1	2	3	4	Total
Falcons	3	0	0	0	3
RedHawks	10	27	7	0	44

=== Ohio ===
	1	2	3	4	Total
Bobcats	24	14	28	0	66
Falcons	14	10	0	0	24

=== At Buffalo ===
	1	2	3	4	Total
Falcons	0	7	0	0	7
Bulls	21	14	0	14	49
