= Tom Arth =

American football coach and player (born 1981)

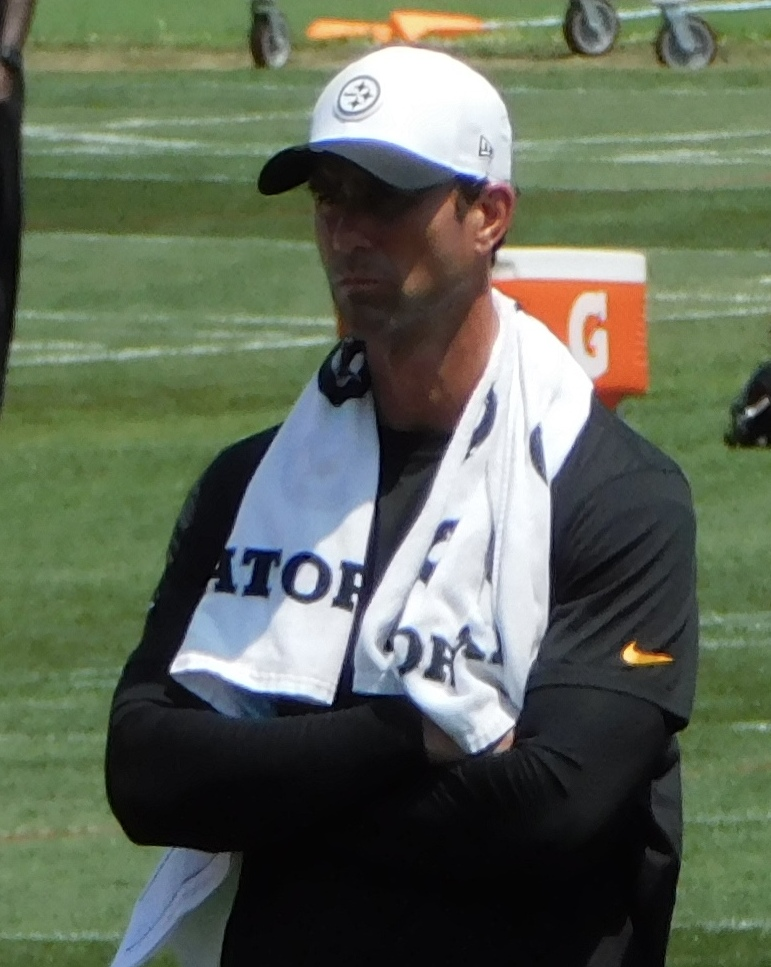
- Arth with the Pittsburgh Steelers in 2025

Pittsburgh Steelers
- Title: Quarterbacks coach

Personal information
- Born: May 11, 1981 (age 45); Cleveland, Ohio, U.S.
- Listed height: 6 ft 4 in (1.93 m)
- Listed weight: 220 lb (100 kg)

Career information
- Position: Quarterback (No. 14)
- High school: Saint Ignatius (Cleveland)
- College: John Carroll
- NFL draft: 2003: undrafted

Career history

Playing
- Indianapolis Colts (2003–2005); → Scottish Claymores (2004); → Hamburg Sea Devils (2005); Green Bay Packers (2006)*; Toronto Argonauts (2007)*; Georgia Force (2008); Grand Rapids Rampage (2008)
- * Offseason or practice squad member only

Coaching
- John Carroll (2010–2016); Co-offensive coordinator/quarterbacks coach/assistant recruiting coordinator (2010–2012); Head coach (2013–2016); Chattanooga (2017–2018) Head coach; Akron (2019–2021) Head coach; Los Angeles Chargers (2022–2023) Pass game specialist; Pittsburgh Steelers (2024–present) Quarterbacks coach

Operations
- John Carroll (2010–2012) Director of football operations

Awards and highlights
- As coach: 1 OAC championship (2016); 2× OAC Coach of the Year (2013, 2016); D3football.com National Coach of the Year (2016)

Head coaching record
- Postseason: NCAA D-III playoffs: 5–3 (.625)
- Career: NCAA: 52–45 (.536)

Thomas Edward Arth (born May 11, 1981) is an American football coach and former player who is the quarterbacks coach for the Pittsburgh Steelers of the National Football League (NFL). Arth previously served as the head football coach at John Carroll University from 2013 to 2016, the University of Tennessee Chattanooga from 2017 to 2018, and the University of Akron from 2019 to 2021.

== Playing career ==
=== High school ===
Arth attended Saint Ignatius High School in Cleveland, Ohio. In 1998, he took the reins as the starting quarterback for the perennial national power and led the Wildcats to the Division I state semifinals, where they lost to defending national champion and eventual state champion Canton McKinley High School. Over the course of the 1998 season, Arth threw for over 2,100 yards and 24 touchdowns.

=== College ===
At John Carroll University, Arth started for four years at quarterback for the Blue Streaks, and set 18 program records. He earned unanimous All-American honors as a junior and senior. In 2002, he guided the Blue Streaks to a 12–2 record, an East Regional Championship, and a berth in the semifinals of the NCAA Division III Football Championship playoffs for the first time in program history. Over the course of his career, Arth captured every major passing record at John Carroll, including passing yards (10,457), and touchdowns (89).

=== Professional ===
==== Indianapolis Colts ====
After going undrafted in the 2003 NFL draft, Arth signed with the Indianapolis Colts on April 28, 2003. On August 26, 2003, he was placed on the reserve/non-football illness list, where he spent the entire season. In February 2004, the Colts allocated Arth to NFL Europe to play for the Scottish Claymores. He played in four games, starting one, for the Claymores during the 2004 NFL Europe season, completing 35 of 63 passes (55.6%) for 270 yards, one touchdown, and four interceptions. He was released by the Colts on September 5, 2004. Arth was re-signed by Indianapolis on January 28, 2005, and allocated to NFL Europe to play for the Hamburg Sea Devils. He appeared in two games for Hamburg in 2005, recording six completions on 11 attempts for 150 yards and one touchdown. Arth was released by the Colts on September 3, 2005, and signed to the team's practice squad two days later, where he spent the entire 2005 season.

==== Green Bay Packers ====
Arth became a free agent after the 2005 season, and was signed by the Green Bay Packers on March 22, 2006. He was released on July 26, 2006, prior to the start of training camp.

==== Toronto Argonauts ====
Arth signed with the Toronto Argonauts of the Canadian Football League in February 2007. He was released on June 2, 2007, before the start of training camp.

==== Arena Football League ====
On November 7, 2007, Arth was signed by the Georgia Force of the Arena Football League (AFL) for the 2008 season. He was placed on injured reserve on February 22, and was waived on April 30, 2008.

On May 8, 2008, Arth was signed to the practice squad of the AFL's Grand Rapids Rampage. He was waived the next day. On May 13, after Grand Rapids released backup quarterback John Fitzgerald, the team signed Arth to the active roster to serve as the backup to James MacPherson.

== Coaching career ==
=== John Carroll ===
On December 5, 2012, Arth was named the 17th head football coach at John Carroll.

On November 12, 2016, Arth's program earned their first outright Ohio Athletic Conference (OAC) title since 1989 with a 31–28 victory over No. 1 Mount Union. On December 17, Arth was named D3football.com Coach of the Year for 2016, becoming the first Blue Streaks mentor in any sport to earn a national honor in 42 years.

=== Chattanooga ===
Arth was named the head coach of the University of Tennessee at Chattanooga on December 19, 2016.

=== Akron ===
On December 14, 2018, Arth was named the 28th head football coach at the University of Akron. Akron fired Arth on November 4, 2021, toward the end of his third season. His overall record at Akron was 3–24.

=== Los Angeles Chargers ===
Arth was hired by the Los Angeles Chargers as a pass game specialist on February 9, 2022.

=== Pittsburgh Steelers ===
Arth was hired by the Pittsburgh Steelers as their quarterbacks coach on February 8, 2024.

== Personal life ==
Arth and his wife, Lauren, a 2003 graduate of John Carroll, have five children: Caroline, Thomas, Kathleen, Patrick and Elizabeth.

Arth founded the Cleveland Passing Academy in June 2008.

== Head coaching record ==
Year	Team	Overall	Conference	Standing	Bowl/playoffs
John Carroll Blue Streaks (Ohio Athletic Conference) (2013–2016)
2013	John Carroll	9–2	8–1	2nd	L NCAA Division III First Round
2014	John Carroll	11–2	8–1	2nd	L NCAA Division III Quarterfinal
2015	John Carroll	8–2	7–2	T–2nd	
2016	John Carroll	12–2	9–0	1st	L NCAA Division III Semifinal
John Carroll:		40–8	32–4		
Chattanooga Mocs (Southern Conference) (2017–2018)
2017	Chattanooga	3–8	3–5	T–6th	
2018	Chattanooga	6–5	4–4	T–5th	
Chattanooga:		9–13	7–9		
Akron Zips (Mid-American Conference) (2019–2021)
2019	Akron	0–12	0–8	6th (East)	
2020	Akron	1–5	1–5	5th (East)	
2021	Akron	2–7 (Note: Akron fired Arth with three games remaining in the season)	1–4	(East)	
Akron:		3–24	2–17		
Total:		52–45			
National championship Conference title Conference division title or championship game berth
