= 2020 Akron Zips football team =

American college football season

2020 Akron Zips football
- Conference: Mid-American Conference
- East Division
- Record: 1–5 (1–5 MAC)
- Head coach: Tom Arth (2nd season)
- Offensive coordinator: Tommy Zagorski (2nd season)
- Co-offensive coordinator: Bryan Gasser (2nd season)
- Offensive scheme: Pro-style
- Defensive coordinator: Matt Feeney (2nd season)
- Base defense: 3–4
- Home stadium: InfoCision Stadium–Summa Field

2020 Mid-American Conference football standings
| | Conf. | | | Overall |
| Team | W | | L | W | | L |
|---|---|---|---|---|---|---|
East Division
| No. 25 Buffalo xy | 5 | – | 0 | 6 | – | 1 |
| Kent State | 3 | – | 1 | 3 | – | 1 |
| Ohio | 2 | – | 1 | 2 | – | 1 |
| Miami (OH) | 2 | – | 1 | 2 | – | 1 |
| Akron | 1 | – | 5 | 1 | – | 5 |
| Bowling Green | 0 | – | 5 | 0 | – | 5 |
West Division
| No. 23 Ball State xy$ | 5 | – | 1 | 7 | – | 1 |
| Western Michigan | 4 | – | 2 | 4 | – | 2 |
| Toledo | 4 | – | 2 | 4 | – | 2 |
| Central Michigan | 3 | – | 3 | 3 | – | 3 |
| Eastern Michigan | 2 | – | 4 | 2 | – | 4 |
| Northern Illinois | 0 | – | 6 | 0 | – | 6 |
Championship: Ball State 38, Buffalo 28
$ – Conference champion; x – Division champion/co-champions; y – Championship game participant; Note: Due to COVID-19, the Mid-American suspended the season on August 8, but later decided to begin play on November 4.; Rankings from AP Poll.

The 2020 Akron Zips football team represented the University of Akron during the 2020 NCAA Division I FBS football season. The Zips were led by second-year head coach Tom Arth and played their home games at InfoCision Stadium in Akron, Ohio. They competed as members of the East Division of the Mid-American Conference (MAC). In their fifth game, the Zips defeated Bowling Green, 31–3, to break their 21-game losing streak dating back to the 2018 season.

== Schedule ==
Akron had non-conference games scheduled against Clemson, Youngstown State, New Mexico State, and UMass, which all were canceled due to the COVID-19 pandemic.

| Date | Time | Opponent | Site | TV | Result | Attendance |
|---|---|---|---|---|---|---|
| November 4 | 6:00 p.m. | Western Michigan | InfoCision Stadium–Summa Field; Akron, OH | ESPN3 | L 13–58 | 490 |
| November 10 | 7:00 p.m. | at Ohio | Peden Stadium; Athens, OH | CBSSN | L 10–24 | 1,182 |
| November 17 | 8:00 p.m. | at Kent State | Dix Stadium; Kent, OH (Wagon Wheel) | ESPN | L 35–69 | 0 |
| November 28 | 1:00 p.m. | Miami (OH) | InfoCision Stadium–Summa Field; Akron, OH | ESPN3 | L 7–38 | 0 |
| December 5 | 2:00 p.m. | Bowling Green | InfoCision Stadium–Summa Field; Akron, OH | ESPN3 | W 31–3 | 0 |
| December 12 | 2:30 p.m. | at Buffalo | University at Buffalo Stadium; Amherst, NY | CBSSN | L 7–56 | 0 |
All times are in Eastern time

== Game summaries ==
=== vs Western Michigan ===
Western Michigan Broncos (0–0) vs Akron Zips (0–0) – Game summary

| Quarter | 1 | 2 | 3 | 4 | Total |
|---|---|---|---|---|---|
| Broncos | 16 | 14 | 21 | 7 | 58 |
| Zips | 7 | 6 | 0 | 0 | 13 |

at InfoCision Stadium–Summa Field • Akron, Ohio

- Date: November 4
- Game time: 6:00 p.m.
- Game weather: Clear skies • Temperature: 64 °F (18 °C) • Wind: N at 9 miles per hour (14 km/h)
- Game attendance: 490
- Referee: Greg Sujack
- TV announcers (ESPN3): Michael Reghi (play-by-play) and Dustin Fox (analyst)
- Box score, Recap

Game information

First quarter

- (10:33) WMU – Thiago Kapps 48-yard field goal (Drive: 8 plays, 24 yards, 4:27; Western Michigan 3–0)
- (7:32) AKR – Michael Mathison 14-yard pass from Zach Gibson, Cory Smigel kick (Drive: 6 plays, 73 yards, 2:56; Akron 7–3)
- (3:48) WMU – D'Wayne Eskridge 5-yard pass from Kaleb Eleby, Thiago Kapps kick (Drive: 7 plays, 60 yards, 3:33; Western Michigan 10–7)
- (1:52) WMU – A. J. Thomas 38-yard interception return, Thiago Kapps kick failed (Western Michigan 16–7)

Second quarter

- (13:04) AKR – Cory Smigel 41-yard field goal (Drive: 10 plays, 51 yards, 3:48; Western Michigan 16–10)
- (7:33) WMU – Sean Tyler 12-yard run, Thiago Kapps kick (Drive: 10 plays, 76 yards, 5:25; Western Michigan 23–10)
- (3:41) AKR – Cory Smigel 28-yard field goal (Drive: 11 plays, 64 yards, 3:52; Western Michigan 23–13)
- (1:34) WMU – Jaylen Hall 68-yard pass from Kaleb Eleby, Thiago Kapps kick (Drive: 5 plays, 75 yards, 2:01; Western Michigan 30–13)

Third quarter

- (13:09) WMU – D'Wayne Eskridge 76-yard pass from Kaleb Eleby, Thiago Kapps kick (Drive: 2 plays, 83 yards, 0:53; Western Michigan 37–13)
- (9:14) WMU – Jaxson Kincaide 14-yard run, Thiago Kapps kick (Drive: 4 plays, 53 yards, 1:23; Western Michigan 44–13)
- (0:32) WMU – La'Darius Jefferson 1-yard run, Thiago Kapps kick (Drive: 9 plays, 67 yards, 4:51; Western Michigan 51–13)

Fourth quarter

- (6:14) WMU – Christian Singleton 5-yard run, Thiago Kapps kick (Drive: 4 plays, 17 yards, 2:40; Western Michigan 58–13)

| Statistics | WMU | AKR |
|---|---|---|
| First downs | 21 | 15 |
| Plays–yards | 58–484 | 64–256 |
| Rushes–yards | 39–218 | 32–130 |
| Passing yards | 266 | 126 |
| Passing: comp–att–int | 13–19–0 | 19–32–1 |
| Time of possession | 30:53 | 29:07 |

| Team | Category | Player | Statistics |
|---|---|---|---|
| Western Michigan | Passing | Kaleb Eleby | 12/16, 262 yards, 3 TD |
| Western Michigan | Rushing | La'Darius Jefferson | 9 carries, 70 yards, 1 TD |
| Western Michigan | Receiving | D'Wayne Eskridge | 3 receptions, 114 yards, 2 TD |
| Akron | Passing | Zach Gibson | 18/30, 125 yards, 1 TD, 1 INT |
| Akron | Rushing | Boogie Knight | 11 carries, 74 yards |
| Akron | Receiving | Michael Mathison | 6 receptions, 44 yards, 1 TD |

=== at Ohio ===
Akron Zips (0–1) at Ohio Bobcats (0–1) – Game summary

| Quarter | 1 | 2 | 3 | 4 | Total |
|---|---|---|---|---|---|
| Zips | 0 | 7 | 3 | 0 | 10 |
| Bobcats | 7 | 7 | 3 | 7 | 24 |

at Peden Stadium • Athens, Ohio

- Date: November 10
- Game time: 7:00 p.m.
- Game weather: Clear • Temperature: 68 °F (20 °C) • Wind: 5 miles per hour (8.0 km/h)
- Game attendance: 1,182
- Referee: Tim O'Dey
- TV announcers (CBSSN): Dave Ryan (play-by-play) and Corey Chavous (analyst)
- Box score, Recap

Game information

First quarter

- (12:10) OHIO – De'Montre Tuggle 9-yard run, Tristian Vandenberg kick (Drive: 6 plays, 62 yards, 2:50; Ohio 7–0)

Second quarter

- (12:27) OHIO – Armani Rogers 1-yard run, Tristian Vandenberg kick (Drive: 3 plays, 41 yards, 1:13; Ohio 14–0)
- (4:25) AKR – Nate Stewart 14-yard pass from Zach Gibson, Cory Smigel kick (Drive: 9 plays, 97 yards, 4:22; Ohio 14–7)

Third quarter

- (9:47) AKR – Cory Smigel 35-yard field goal (Drive: 10 plays, 58 yards, 5:13; Ohio 14–10)
- (6:27) OHIO – Tristian Vandenberg 44-yard field goal (Drive: 7 plays, 21 yards, 3:14; Ohio 17–10)

Fourth quarter

- (2:02) OHIO – De'Montre Tuggle 1-yard run, Jonah Fortkamp kick (Drive: 9 plays, 70 yards, 4:23; Ohio 24–10)

| Statistics | AKR | OHIO |
|---|---|---|
| First downs | 20 | 15 |
| Plays–yards | 72–434 | 50–307 |
| Rushes–yards | 42–216 | 33–185 |
| Passing yards | 218 | 122 |
| Passing: comp–att–int | 18–30–2 | 10–17–0 |
| Time of possession | 34:53 | 25:07 |

| Team | Category | Player | Statistics |
|---|---|---|---|
| Akron | Passing | Zach Gibson | 18/30, 218 yards, 1 TD, 2 INT |
| Akron | Rushing | Teon Dollard | 22 carries, 165 yards |
| Akron | Receiving | George Qualls Jr. | 3 receptions, 64 yards |
| Ohio | Passing | Kurtis Rourke | 8/14, 92 yards |
| Ohio | Rushing | De'Montre Tuggle | 22 carries, 139 yards, 2 TD |
| Ohio | Receiving | Shane Hooks | 4 receptions, 73 yards |

=== at Kent State (Wagon Wheel) ===
Akron Zips (0–2) at Kent State Golden Flashes (2–0) – Game summary

| Quarter | 1 | 2 | 3 | 4 | Total |
|---|---|---|---|---|---|
| Zips | 7 | 21 | 0 | 7 | 35 |
| Golden Flashes | 14 | 21 | 20 | 14 | 69 |

at Dix Stadium • Kent, Ohio

- Date: November 17
- Game time: 8:00 p.m.
- Game weather: Wintry mix • Temperature: 34 °F (1 °C) • Wind: 17 miles per hour (27 km/h)
- Game attendance: 0
- Referee: Bryan Banks
- TV announcers (ESPN): Courtney Lyle (play-by-play) and Dustin Fox (analyst)
- Box score, Recap

Game information

First quarter

- (12:05) KENT – Marquez Cooper 3-yard run, Matthew Trickett kick (Drive: 5 plays, 46 yards, 1:18; Kent State 7–0)
- (7:51) AKR – Xavior Gray 0-yard fumble return, Cory Smigel kick (Tied 7–7)
- (4:49) KENT – Dustin Crum 15-yard run, Matthew Trickett kick (Drive: 8 plays, 75 yards, 3:02; Kent State 14–7)

Second quarter

- (10:08) AKR – Teon Dollard 28-yard run, Cory Smigel kick (Drive: 8 plays, 86 yards, 3:42; Tied 14–14)
- (9:56) KENT – Isaiah McKoy 75-yard pass from Dustin Crum, Matthew Trickett kick (Drive: 1 play, 75 yards, 0:12; Kent State 21–14)
- (9:38) AKR – Teon Dollard 59-yard run, Cory Smigel kick (Drive: 1 play, 59 yards, 0:10; Tied 21–21)
- (5:42) KENT – Marquez Cooper 19-yard run, Matthew Trickett kick (Drive: 9 plays, 79 yards, 3:52; Kent State 28–21)
- (0:58) AKR – Teon Dollard 13-yard run, Cory Smigel kick (Drive: 9 plays, 64 yards, 4:44; Tied 28–28)
- (0:15) KENT – Ja'Shaun Poke 11-yard pass from Dustin Crum, Matthew Trickett kick (Drive: 6 plays, 58 yards, 0:37; Kent State 35–28)

Third quarter

- (13:08) KENT – Dustin Crum 9-yard run, Matthew Trickett kick (Drive: 7 plays, 78 yards, 1:46; Kent State 42–28)
- (9:14) KENT – Marquez Cooper 1-yard run, Matthew Trickett kick (Drive: 5 plays, 36 yards, 1:35; Kent State 49–28)
- (0:20) KENT – Bryan Bradford 13-yard pass from Dustin Crum, two-point pass failed (Drive: 12 plays, 87 yards, 4:54; Kent State 55–28)

Fourth quarter

- (12:50) AKR – Teon Dollard 8-yard run, Cory Smigel kick (Drive: 6 plays, 61 yards, 2:23; Kent State 55–35)
- (10:00) KENT – Xavier Williams 49-yard run, Matthew Trickett kick (Drive: 5 plays, 75 yards, 2:50; Kent State 62–35)
- (2:49) KENT – Javaughn Williams 1-yard pass from Collin Schlee, Matthew Trickett kick (Drive: 7 plays, 27 yards, 4:43; Kent State 69–35)

| Statistics | AKR | KENT |
|---|---|---|
| First downs | 21 | 37 |
| Plays–yards | 56–366 | 78–750 |
| Rushes–yards | 41–212 | 51–390 |
| Passing yards | 154 | 360 |
| Passing: comp–att–int | 9–15–1 | 24–27–0 |
| Time of possession | 29:21 | 30:39 |

| Team | Category | Player | Statistics |
|---|---|---|---|
| Akron | Passing | Zach Gibson | 9/15, 154 yards, 1 INT |
| Akron | Rushing | Teon Dollard | 28 carries, 202 yards, 4 TD |
| Akron | Receiving | Nate Stewart | 2 receptions, 68 yards |
| Kent State | Passing | Dustin Crum | 22/25, 348 yards, 3 TD |
| Kent State | Rushing | Marquez Cooper | 14 carries, 107 yards, 3 TD |
| Kent State | Receiving | Isaiah McKoy | 6 receptions, 140 yards, 1 TD |

=== vs Miami (OH) ===
Miami RedHawks (1–1) vs Akron Zips (0–3) – Game summary

| Quarter | 1 | 2 | 3 | 4 | Total |
|---|---|---|---|---|---|
| RedHawks | 7 | 17 | 7 | 7 | 38 |
| Zips | 0 | 0 | 0 | 7 | 7 |

at Infocision Stadium–Summa Field • Akron, Ohio

- Date: November 28
- Game time: 1:00 p.m.
- Game weather: Sunny • Temperature: 43 °F (6 °C) • Wind: W at 9 miles per hour (14 km/h)
- Game attendance: 0
- Referee: Tim O'Dey
- TV announcers (ESPN3): Anthony Lima (play-by-play) and Je'Rod Cherry (analyst)
- Box score, Recap

Game information

First quarter

- (9:35) M-OH – Jack Sorenson 61-yard pass from Brett Gabbert, Henry Beckett kick (Drive: 4 plays, 86 yards, 1:47; Miami (OH) 7–0)

Second quarter

- (11:42) M-OH – Henry Beckett 42-yard field goal (Drive: 9 plays, 44 yards, 4:07; Miami (OH) 10–0)
- (6:10) M-OH – Jack Sorenson 29-yard pass from Brett Gabbert, Henry Beckett kick (Drive: 7 plays, 58 yards, 2:52; Miami (OH) 17–0)
- (1:17) M-OH – Jack Sorenson 28-yard pass from Brett Gabbert, Henry Beckett kick (Drive: 8 plays, 70 yards, 3:56; Miami (OH) 24–0)

Third quarter

- (2:38) M-OH – Emmanuel Rugamba 62-yard interception return, Henry Beckett kick (Miami (OH) 31–0)

Fourth quarter

- (11:37) M-OH – Jack Sorenson 15-yard pass from Brett Gabbert, Henry Beckett kick (Drive: 9 plays, 70 yards, 3:41; Miami (OH) 38–0)
- (8:08) AKR – Michael Mathison 11-yard pass from Zach Gibson, Cory Smigel kick (Drive: 8 plays, 74 yards, 3:24; Miami (OH) 38–7)

| Statistics | M-OH | AKR |
|---|---|---|
| First downs | 17 | 14 |
| Plays–yards | 54–416 | 55–145 |
| Rushes–yards | 27–108 | 28–4 |
| Passing yards | 308 | 141 |
| Passing: comp–att–int | 18–27–0 | 16–27–1 |
| Time of possession | 28:17 | 31:43 |

| Team | Category | Player | Statistics |
|---|---|---|---|
| Miami (OH) | Passing | Brett Gabbert | 18/27, 308 yards, 4 TD |
| Miami (OH) | Rushing | Brett Gabbert | 4 carries, 48 yards |
| Miami (OH) | Receiving | Jack Sorenson | 8 receptions, 177 yards, 4 TD |
| Akron | Passing | Zach Gibson | 16/27, 141 yards, 1 TD, 1 INT |
| Akron | Rushing | Teon Dollard | 13 carries, 22 yards |
| Akron | Receiving | George Qualls Jr. | 3 receptions, 50 yards |

=== vs Bowling Green ===
| | 1 | 2 | 3 | 4 | Total |
|---|---|---|---|---|---|
| Falcons | 3 | 0 | 0 | 0 | 3 |
| Zips | 3 | 14 | 7 | 7 | 31 |

=== at No. 24 Buffalo ===
| | 1 | 2 | 3 | 4 | Total |
|---|---|---|---|---|---|
| Zips | 0 | 0 | 0 | 7 | 7 |
| No. 24 Bulls | 14 | 21 | 14 | 7 | 56 |

== Roster ==
2020 Akron Zips football team roster
Players
Coaches
Offense

| Pos. | # | Name | Class |
|---|---|---|---|
| RB | 34 | Jaylen Ball | Fr |
| OL | 66 | Ryan Beckman | Fr |
| WR | 30 | Gavin Blunt | So |
| TE | 25 | Tristian Brank | Fr |
| RB | 36 | Michiah Burton | So |
| OL | 74 | Ronan Chambers | Fr |
| RB | 26 | Isiah Childs | Fr |
| OL | 75 | Jordan Daniels | Fr |
| QB | 12 | T. J. DeShields | So |
| RB | 7 | Teon Dollard | Jr |
| TE | 83 | Nick Dottore | Fr |
| OL | 62 | Vincent Fonte Jr. | So |
| OL | 79 | Joe Gavriloff | Fr |
| OL | 65 | Tony Georges | Fr |
| RB | 20 | Cole Gest | Sr |
| QB | 15 | Zach Gibson | Fr |
| OL | 77 | Xavior Gray | Fr |
| WR | 16 | Tony Grimes Jr. | Fr |
| QB | 9 | Brayden Hawkins | So |
| OL | 70 | Caleb Herring | Fr |
| WR | 48 | Blake Hester | Fr |
| WR | 0 | Julian Hicks | Jr |
| RB | 27 | Jamason Jodway | Fr |
| WR | 31 | Ethan Johnson | Fr |
| WR | 11 | Jalen Knight | Fr |
| WR | 5 | Jeremiah Knight | Jr |
| WR | 37 | Nolan Labuda | Fr |
| TE | 85 | Zackary Leininger | Jr |
| QB | 14 | Joey Marousek | Fr |
| WR | 3 | Michael Mathison | So |
| OL | 71 | Shawn Muldowney II | Jr |
| OL | 73 | Owen Murphy | Fr |
| WR | 81 | Shawn Naim | Fr |
| QB | 1 | Kato Nelson | Sr |
| RB | 6 | Jonzell Norrils | Fr |
| OL | 53 | Bryce Petersen | Sr |
| WR | 21 | Bryce Profitt | Fr |
| WR | 4 | George Qualls Jr. | Jr |
| OL | 63 | Alex Robarge | Fr |
| WR | 88 | Timothy Scippio | Jr |
| TE | 80 | Jacob Shaffer | Fr |
| TE | 84 | Kenyon Sholty | Fr |
| WR | 35 | Nathan Simon | Fr |
| WR | 2 | Nate Stewart | Sr |
| WR | 13 | Kevin Walls | Fr |
| WR | 86 | Marquis Whitmire | Jr |
| OL | 76 | Nate Williams | Fr |
| WR | 82 | Jameel Williamson | Fr |
| TE | 24 | Maverick Wolfley | So |
| TE | 87 | Brycen Yarmo | So |

Defense

| Pos. | # | Name | Class |
|---|---|---|---|
| DB | 48 | Kavari Adams | So |
| DL | 68 | Deacon Allen | Fr |
| DB | 12 | Charles Amankwaa | So |
| LB | 27 | Bubba Arslanian | Jr |
| LB | 59 | Beau Bachie | Fr |
| DL | 99 | Eric Bentley | So |
| LB | 22 | Brandon Bischof | Jr |
| LB | 40 | Kyle Bischof | Fr |
| OLB | 55 | Collier Brown | Fr |
| CB | 1 | Randy Cochran Jr. | So |
| S | 44 | Sean Conroy | So |
| LB | 21 | Reggie Corner Jr. | So |
| S | 24 | Adetutu Daranijo | So |
| LB | 52 | Zach DiLauro | So |
| LB | 58 | Marco Donatelli | Fr |
| S | 32 | Owen Faulkner | Fr |
| CB | 28 | A. J. Felton | So |
| LB | 57 | Connor Francz | Fr |
| LB | 3 | DeMarkus Glover | Sr |
| S | 4 | Woobendy Guerrier | Jr |
| DL | 96 | Darrius Harris | Jr |
| DL | 14 | Julius Hawkins | Fr |
| DL | 67 | Logan Hawkins | So |
| S | 19 | MyJaden Horton | Fr |
| DL | 90 | Angelo Howze | Jr |
| CB | 23 | Ronald Jackson Jr. | Fr |
| LB | 17 | Juan Jarrett | Fr |
| S | 39 | DiMarco Johnson | Fr |
| S | 8 | Jaylen Kelly-Powell | Sr |
| OLB | 10 | Quevan Lawson | Fr |
| LB | 50 | Kendal Marshall | Fr |
| OLB | 53 | Nicholas Mayle | Fr |
| OLB | 45 | Ryan McClain | Jr |
| LB | 56 | Jake Miller | Fr |
| DL | 94 | John Mitchell | Sr |
| DL | 69 | Eseosa Obas | Fr |
| CB | 13 | Chu Ogbonna | Jr |
| CB | 42 | Gamari Peterson | Fr |
| DL | 64 | Kirk Popelas | Fr |
| OLB | 60 | Dean Ramicone | Sr |
| DL | 61 | Ed Reely | Fr |
| OLB | 7 | Julian Richardson | So |
| CB | 6 | Jordyn Riley | Jr |
| S | 38 | Joseph Sarpong | Fr |
| OLB | 5 | Michael Scott | Jr |
| DL | 95 | Brendan Smith | Fr |
| LB | 20 | Michael Snowden | Fr |
| DL | 11 | Nazir Sy | So |
| S | 43 | Tobias Thomas Pitts | Fr |
| S | 2 | Corey Thomas Jr. | Fr |
| DL | 97 | Janirr Wade | Fr |
| CB | 18 | A. J. Watts | So |
| LB | 9 | Demetrick Watts | Sr |
| DL | 0 | Bryce Wilson | So |
| CB | 29 | Quentin Woodall | So |

Special teams

| Pos. | # | Name | Class |
|---|---|---|---|
| LS | 65 | Kyle Bauman | So |
| ATH | 34 | Tyson Durant | Fr |
| PK | 47 | Jerry Fitschen | Sr |
| LS | 54 | Cameron Lyons | Jr |
| P | 42 | Kyle Romenick | Fr |
| PK | 46 | Ethan Slike | So |
| PK | 41 | Cory Smigel | So |

Head coach

- Tom Arth

Coordinators/assistant coaches

- Matt Feeney – Defensive coordinator/safeties
- Bryan Gasser – Co-offensive coordinator/wide receivers
- Tommy Zagorski – Offensive coordinator/offensive line
- Brian Cochran – Defensive line
- Chris Cook – Tight ends/offensive tackles
- Jayden Everett – Running backs
- Deonte Gibson – Outside linebackers/defensive ends
- Chris Hurd – Special teams coordinator
- Jamael Lett – Secondary
- Oscar Rodriguez Jr. – Inside linebackers
- Ben Murphy – Director of football operations
- Alex Kline – Director of player personnel
- Deonte Mack – Director of athletic performance/strength & conditioning
- Rich Worsell – Director of football research & analytics
- Claire Crosby – Assistant director of football operations
- Conner Bogard – Defensive quality control
- Tony Caljean – Special teams quality control
- Devin Jordan – Offensive quality control
- Greg Wood – Special teams quality control
- Anthony Cicione – Graduate assistant (defense)
- Sam Kukura – Graduate assistant (offense)
- LaTroy Lewis – Graduate assistant (defense)
- Ray Brewster – Football assistant
- Jake Schaefer – Football assistant

Legend

- (C) Team captain
- (S) Suspended
- (I) Ineligible
- Injured
- Redshirt

Roster
