= 2020 Western Michigan Broncos football team =

American college football season

2020 Western Michigan Broncos football
- Conference: Mid-American Conference
- West Division
- Record: 4–2 (4–2 MAC)
- Head coach: Tim Lester (4th season)
- Offensive coordinator: Jake Moreland (4th season)
- Offensive scheme: West Coast
- Defensive coordinator: Lou Esposito (4th season)
- Base defense: 4–2–5
- Home stadium: Waldo Stadium

2020 Mid-American Conference football standings
	Conf.			Overall
Team	W		L	W		L
East Division
No. 25 Buffalo xy	5	–	0	6	–	1
Kent State	3	–	1	3	–	1
Ohio	2	–	1	2	–	1
Miami (OH)	2	–	1	2	–	1
Akron	1	–	5	1	–	5
Bowling Green	0	–	5	0	–	5
West Division
No. 23 Ball State xy$	5	–	1	7	–	1
Western Michigan	4	–	2	4	–	2
Toledo	4	–	2	4	–	2
Central Michigan	3	–	3	3	–	3
Eastern Michigan	2	–	4	2	–	4
Northern Illinois	0	–	6	0	–	6
Championship: Ball State 38, Buffalo 28
$ – Conference champion; x – Division champion/co-champions; y – Championship game participant; Note: Due to COVID-19, the Mid-American suspended the season on August 8, but later decided to begin play on November 4.; Rankings from AP Poll.

The 2020 Western Michigan Broncos football team represented Western Michigan University in the 2020 NCAA Division I FBS football season. The Broncos played their home games at Waldo Stadium in Kalamazoo, Michigan, and competed in the West Division of the Mid-American Conference (MAC). The team was led by fourth-year head coach Tim Lester. On August 8, 2020, it was announced that the MAC would be cancelling the season due to the COVID-19 pandemic. The MAC later changed that decision, with teams playing a six-game conference-only season.

== Schedule ==
Western Michigan had games scheduled against Stony Brook and Syracuse, which were canceled due to the COVID-19 pandemic.

Date	Time	Opponent	Site	TV	Result	Attendance
November 4	6:00 p.m.	at Akron	InfoCision Stadium; Akron, OH	ESPN3	W 58–13	449
November 11	8:00 p.m.	Toledo	Waldo Stadium; Kalamazoo, MI	ESPN	W 41–38	0
November 18	7:00 p.m.	at Central Michigan	Kelly/Shorts Stadium; Mount Pleasant, MI (Victory Cannon / Michigan MAC Trophy)	ESPN2	W 52–44	0
November 28	12:00 p.m.	Northern Illinois	Waldo Stadium; Kalamazoo, MI	ESPN+	W 30–27	0
December 5	2:00 p.m.	Eastern Michigan	Waldo Stadium; Kalamazoo, MI (Michigan MAC Trophy)	ESPN+	L 42–53	0
December 12	12:00 p.m.	at Ball State	Scheumann Stadium; Muncie, IN	ESPN+	L 27–30	823
Rankings from AP Poll and CFP Rankings after November 24 released prior to game; All times are in Eastern time

== Players drafted into the NFL ==
Round	Pick	Player	Position	NFL Club
2	56	D'Wayne Eskridge	WR	Seattle Seahawks
5	155	Jaylon Moore	OG	San Francisco 49ers
