= 2020 Mid-American Conference football season =

- League: NCAA Division I Football Bowl Subdivision
- Sport: Football
- Duration: November 4 - December 18
- Teams: 12

Regular season
- Season MVP: Jaret Patterson
- East Division champions: Buffalo
- West Division champions: Ball State

MAC Championship Game
- Champions: Ball State
- Runners-up: Buffalo
- Finals MVP: Drew Plitt & Jimmy Daw, Ball State

Seasons
- 2019 2021

2020 Mid-American Conference football standings
	Conf.			Overall
Team	W		L	W		L
East Division
No. 25 Buffalo xy	5	–	0	6	–	1
Kent State	3	–	1	3	–	1
Ohio	2	–	1	2	–	1
Miami (OH)	2	–	1	2	–	1
Akron	1	–	5	1	–	5
Bowling Green	0	–	5	0	–	5
West Division
No. 23 Ball State xy$	5	–	1	7	–	1
Western Michigan	4	–	2	4	–	2
Toledo	4	–	2	4	–	2
Central Michigan	3	–	3	3	–	3
Eastern Michigan	2	–	4	2	–	4
Northern Illinois	0	–	6	0	–	6
Championship: Ball State 38, Buffalo 28
$ – Conference champion; x – Division champion/co-champions; y – Championship game participant; Note: Due to COVID-19, the Mid-American suspended the season on August 8, but later decided to begin play on November 4.; Rankings from AP Poll.

The 2020 Mid-American Conference football season was the 75th season for the Mid-American Conference (MAC), as part of the 2020 NCAA Division I FBS football season.

The provisional schedule was released on February 26, 2020, with a regular season between September 3 and November 28, 2020, and the MAC Championship Game on December 5, 2020. On August 8, 2020, the MAC announced that all fall sports had been postponed due to the COVID-19 pandemic, with plans to attempt play in Spring 2021. Commissioner Jon Steinbrecher stated that "there are simply too many unknowns to put our student-athletes into situations that are not clearly understood." It was reported that the NIU Huskies — the conference's most successful team — were instrumental in pushing for a full cancellation of the season, and had also suggested the possibility of opting out if the MAC did decide to play. Concerns were also raised over the budgetary impacts of health protocols such as testing, especially with the cancellation of all but five games against Power Five conference opponents (which often serve as a major revenue source) due to restrictions to in-conference play only. The MAC became the first FBS conference to cancel the 2020 season entirely due to COVID-19. On September 24, 2020, The MAC voted unanimously to resume the fall football season. the six-game conference-only schedule will begin on Wednesday, Nov. 4 with a full slate of games. The regular season will conclude with the East Division & West Division Champions playing in the MAC Championship Game on Friday, Dec. 18 at Ford Field in Detroit, Mich The Conference will implement a COVID-19 testing program requiring four antigen tests per week with all positive tests needing confirmation with a polymerase chain reaction (PCR) test. Any student athlete with a positive test will enter a cardiac screening protocol. The MAC's approved COVID-19 testing protocols, including four tests per week, will begin Monday, October 5. On October 7 the MAC released the new 2020 Football schedule.

== Head coaches ==
Team	Head coach	Previous Job	Years at school	Overall record	MAC record	MAC titles
Akron	Tom Arth	Chattanooga	5	49–33 (.598)	0–8 (.000)	0
Ball State	Mike Neu	New Orleans Saints (QB Coach)	5	14–26 (.350)	9–27 (.250)	0
Bowling Green	Scot Loeffler	Virginia Tech Hokies (QB Coach)	2	3–9 (.250)	2–6 (.250)	0
Buffalo	Lance Leipold	Wisconsin–Whitewater	6	31–32 (.492)	20–20 (.500)	0
Central Michigan	Jim McElwain	Florida	2	52–34 (.605)	6–2 (.750)	1
Eastern Michigan	Chris Creighton	Drake	7	28–47 (.373)	16–32 (.333)	0
Kent State	Sean Lewis	Syracuse (Co Off. Coordinator)	2	7–6 (.538)	5–3 (.625)	0
Miami	Chuck Martin	Notre Dame (Off. Coordinator/QB Coach)	6	32–48 (.400)	26–22 (.542)	1
Northern Illinois	Thomas Hammock	Baltimore Ravens running backs coach	2	5–7 (.417)	4–4 (.500)	0
Ohio	Frank Solich	Nebraska	16	113–81 (.582)	71–45 (.612)	0
Toledo	Jason Candle	Toledo (Off. Coordinator)	5	34–20 (.630)	23–11 (.676)	1
Western Michigan	Tim Lester	Purdue (QB Coach)	4	20–18 (.526)	14–9 (.609)	0

== Rankings ==
		Pre	Wk 2	Wk 3	Wk 4	Wk 5	Wk 6	Wk 7	Wk 8	Wk 9	Wk 10	Wk 11	Wk 12	Wk 13	Wk 14	Wk 15	Wk 16	Final
Akron	AP																	
Akron	C																	
Akron	CFP	Not released																
Ball State	AP																RV	23
Ball State	C																RV	23
Ball State	CFP	Not released																
Bowling Green	AP																	
Bowling Green	C																	
Bowling Green	CFP	Not released																
Buffalo	AP											RV	RV	RV	24	23	RV	25
Buffalo	C													RV	RV	RV	RV	25
Buffalo	CFP	Not released																
Central Michigan	AP																	
Central Michigan	C																	
Central Michigan	CFP	Not released																
Eastern Michigan	AP																	
Eastern Michigan	C																	
Eastern Michigan	CFP	Not released																
Kent State	AP																	
Kent State	C																	
Kent State	CFP	Not released																
Miami	AP																	
Miami	C																	
Miami	CFP	Not released																
Northern Illinois	AP																	
Northern Illinois	C																	
Northern Illinois	CFP	Not released																
Ohio	AP																	
Ohio	C																	
Ohio	CFP	Not released																
Toledo	AP																	
Toledo	C																	
Toledo	CFP	Not released																
Western Michigan	AP																	
Western Michigan	C																	
Western Michigan	CFP	Not released																

Legend
	Improvement in ranking
	Drop in ranking
	Not ranked previous week
	No change in ranking from previous week
RV	Received votes but were not ranked in Top 25 of poll
т	Tied with team above or below also with this symbol

== Regular season schedule ==
=== Week 1 ===
Date	Time	Visiting team	Home team	Site	TV	Result	Attendance	Ref.
November 4	6:00 p.m.	Eastern Michigan	Kent State	Dix Stadium • Kent, OH	ESPN+	KSU 27–23		
November 4	6:00 p.m.	Western Michigan	Akron	InfoCision Stadium • Akron, OH	ESPN3	WMU 58–13	490	
November 4	7:00 p.m.	Ball State	Miami	Yager Stadium • Oxford, OH	CBSSN	M-OH 38–31		
November 4	7:00 p.m.	Buffalo	Northern Illinois	Huskie Stadium • DeKalb, IL	ESPN2	UB 49–30	449	
November 4	7:00 p.m.	Ohio	Central Michigan	Kelly/Shorts Stadium • Mount Pleasant, MI	ESPN	CMU 30–27	757	
November 4	8:00 p.m.	Bowling Green	Toledo	Glass Bowl • Toledo, OH (rivalry)	ESPNU	TOL 38–3		
^{#}Rankings from AP Poll released prior to game. All times are in Eastern Time.

=== Week 2 ===
Date	Time	Visiting team	Home team	Site	TV	Result	Attendance	Ref.
November 10	7:00 p.m.	Akron	Ohio	Peden Stadium • Athens, OH	CBSSN	OU 24–10	1,182	
November 10	7:00 p.m.	Kent State	Bowling Green	Doyt Perry Stadium • Bowling Green, OH (Anniversary Award)	ESPNU	KSU 62–24	1,500	
November 10	8:00 p.m.	Miami	Buffalo	UB Stadium • Buffalo, NY	ESPN	UB 42–10		
November 11	7:00 p.m.	Eastern Michigan	Ball State	Scheumann Stadium • Muncie, IN	CBSSN	BSU 38–31	1,183	
November 11	8:00 p.m.	Central Michigan	Northern Illinois	Huskie Stadium • DeKalb, IL	ESPNU	CMU 40–10	419	
November 11	8:00 p.m.	Toledo	Western Michigan	Waldo Stadium • Kalamazoo, MI	ESPN2	WMU 41–38		
^{#}Rankings from AP Poll released prior to game. All times are in Eastern Time.

=== Week 3 ===
Date	Time	Visiting team	Home team	Site	TV	Result	Attendance	Ref.
November 17	7:00 p.m.	Buffalo	Bowling Green	Doyt Perry Stadium • Bowling Green, OH	CBSSN	UB 42–17	1,500	
November 17	8:00 p.m.	Akron	Kent State	Dix Stadium • Kent, OH (Wagon Wheel)	ESPN	KSU 69–45		
November 17	8:00 p.m.	Ohio	Miami	Yager Stadium • Oxford, OH (Battle of the Bricks)	N/A	Cancelled	n/a	
November 18	7:00 p.m.	Northern Illinois	Ball State	Scheumann Stadium • Muncie, IN (Bronze Stalk Trophy)	ESPNN	BSU 31–25	859	
November 18	7:00 p.m.	Toledo	Eastern Michigan	Rynearson Stadium • Ypsilanti, MI	CBSSN	TOL 45–28	300	
November 18	7:00 p.m.	Western Michigan	Central Michigan	Kelly/Shorts Stadium • Mount Pleasant, MI (Michigan MAC Trophy, rivalry)	ESPN2	WMU 52–44		
^{#}Rankings from AP Poll released prior to game. All times are in Eastern Time.

=== Week 4 ===
Date	Time	Visiting team	Home team	Site	TV	Result	Attendance	Ref.
November 27	4:00 p.m.	Central Michigan	Eastern Michigan	Rynearson Stadium • Ypsilanti, MI (Michigan MAC Trophy)	CBSSN	CMU 31–23		
November 28	12:00 p.m.	Ball State	Toledo	Glass Bowl • Toledo, OH	ESPN3	BSU 27–24		
November 28	12:00 p.m.	Bowling Green	Ohio	Peden Stadium • Athens, OH	ESPNU	OU 52–10	1,182	
November 28	12:00 p.m.	Kent State	Buffalo	UB Stadium • Buffalo, NY	CBSSN	UB 70–41		
November 28	12:00 p.m.	Northern Illinois	Western Michigan	Waldo Stadium • Kalamazoo, MI	ESPN+	WMU 30–27		
November 28	1:00 p.m.	Miami	Akron	InfoCision Stadium • Akron, OH	ESPN3	M-OH 38–7		
^{#}Rankings from AP Poll released prior to game. All times are in Eastern Time.

=== Week 5 ===
Date	Time	Visiting team	Home team	Site	TV	Result	Attendance	Ref.
December 5	12:00 p.m.	Toledo	Northern Illinois	Huskie Stadium • DeKalb, IL	ESPN3	TOL 41–24		
December 5	12:00 p.m.	Kent State	Miami	Yager Stadium • Oxford, OH		cancelled	n/a	
December 5	2:00 p.m.	Ball State	Central Michigan	Kelly/Shorts Stadium • Mount Pleasant, MI	ESPNU	BSU 45–20		
December 5	2:00 p.m.	Bowling Green	Akron	InfoCision Stadium • Akron, OH	ESPN3	AKR 31–3		
December 5	2:00 p.m.	Eastern Michigan	Western Michigan	Waldo Stadium • Kalamazoo, MI (Michigan MAC Trophy)	ESPN+	EMU 53–42		
December 5	3:30 p.m.	Buffalo	Ohio	Peden Stadium • Athens, OH		cancelled	n/a	
^{#}Rankings from AP Poll released prior to game. All times are in Eastern Time.

=== Week 6 ===
Date	Time	Visiting team	Home team	Site	TV	Result	Attendance	Ref.
December 12	12:00 p.m.	Western Michigan	Ball State	Scheumann Stadium • Muncie, IN	ESPN+	BSU 30–27	823	
December 12	12:00 p.m.	Northern Illinois	Eastern Michigan	Rynearson Stadium • Ypsilanti, MI	ESPN3	EMU 41–33	300	
December 12	12:00 p.m.	Miami	Bowling Green	Doyt Perry Stadium • Bowling Green, OH	n/a	cancelled	n/a	
December 12	12:00 p.m.	Ohio	Kent State	Dix Stadium • Kent, OH	n/a	cancelled	n/a	
December 12	2:30 p.m.	Akron	No. 24 Buffalo	UB Stadium • Buffalo, NY	CBSSN	UB 56–7	0	
December 12	3:00 p.m.	Central Michigan	Toledo	Glass Bowl • Toledo, OH	ESPN3	TOL 24–23	0	
^{#}Rankings from AP Poll released prior to game. All times are in Eastern Time.

=== Championship Game ===
==== Week 7 (MAC Championship game) ====
Date	Time	Visiting team	Home team	Site	TV	Result	Attendance	Ref.
December 18	7:30 p.m.	Ball State	No. 23 Buffalo	Ford Field • Detroit, MI	ESPN	BSU 38–28		
^{#}Rankings from AP Poll released prior to game. All times are in Eastern Time Zone.

== Postseason ==
=== Bowl games ===
Legend
MAC win
MAC loss

Bowl game	Date	Site	Television	Time (EST)	MAC team	Opponent	Score	Attendance
Camellia Bowl	December 25	Cramton Bowl • Montgomery, AL	ESPN	2:30 p.m.	Buffalo	Marshall	W 17–10	2,512
Arizona Bowl	December 31	Arizona Stadium • Tucson, AZ	CBS	2:00 p.m.	Ball State	San Jose State	W 34–13	0

== Awards and honors ==
=== Player of the week honors ===
==== East Division ====
Week	Offensive			Defensive			Special Teams		
Week	Player	Team	Position	Player	Team	Position	Player	Team	Position
Week 1 (November 9)	AJ Mayer; Jaret Patterson	Miami; Buffalo	QB; RB	Ryan McWood	Miami	LB	De'Montre Tuggle	Ohio	RB/KR
Week 2 (November 16)	Kyle Vantrease	Buffalo	QB	Keye Thompson	Ohio	LB	Dom Dzioban	Miami	P
Week 3 (November 23)	Jaret Patterson; Dustin Crum	Buffalo; Kent State	RB; QB	James Patterson	Buffalo	LB	Matthew Trickett	Kent State	K
Week 4 (November 30)	Jaret Patterson	Buffalo	RB	Kameron Butler	Miami	DE	Julian Ross	Ohio	RB/KR
Week 5 (December 7)	Teon Dollard	Akron	RB	Bubba Arslanian	Akron	LB	Gavin Blunt	Akron	WR
Week 6 (December 14)	Kevin Marks	Buffalo	RB	Eddie Wilson	Buffalo	DT	Tyrone Hill	Buffalo	S

==== West Division ====
Week	Offensive			Defensive			Special Teams		
Week	Player	Team	Position	Player	Team	Position	Player	Team	Position
Week 1 (November 9)	Eli Peters	Toledo	QB	Troy Hairston	Central Michigan	DL	Luke Elzinga	Central Michigan	P
Week 2 (November 16)	Caleb Huntley	Ball State	RB	Brandon Martin	Ball State	LB	Marshall Meeder	Central Michigan	K
Week 3 (November 23)	D'Wayne Eskridge	Western Michigan	WR	Jamal Hines	Toledo	DE	Thiago Kapps	Western Michigan	K
Week 4 (November 30)	Drew Plitt	Ball State	QB	Christian Albright	Ball State	LB	D'Wayne Eskridge	Western Michigan	WR/KR
Week 5 (December 7)	Drew Plitt; Preston Hutchinson	Ball State; Eastern Michigan	QB; QB	Jose Ramirez	Eastern Michigan	DE	Chad Ryland	Eastern Michigan	K
Week 6 (December 14)	Justin Hall	Ball State	WR	Jaylin Thomas	Ball State	LB	Chad Ryland	Eastern Michigan	K

=== MAC individual awards ===
The following individuals received postseason honors as voted by the Mid-American Conference football coaches at the end of the season

Award	Player	School
Offensive Player of the Year	Jaret Patterson	Buffalo
Defensive Player of the Year	Troy Hairston; Brandon Martin	Central Michigan; Ball State
Special Teams Player of the Year	D'Wayne Eskridge	Western Michigan
Freshman Player of the Year	Lew Nichols III	Central Michigan
Vern Smith Leadership Award	Jaret Patterson	Buffalo
Coach of the Year	Lance Leipold	Buffalo

=== All-conference teams ===
Position	Player	Team
First Team Offense
WR	Justin Hall	Ball State
WR	Isaiah McKoy	Kent State
WR	Tyrice Richie	Northern Illinois
WR	D'Wayne Eskridge	Western Michigan
OL	Kayode Awosika	Buffalo
OL	Mike Novitsky	Buffalo
OL	Tommy Doyle	Miami
OL	Bryce Harris	Toledo
OL	Mike Caliendo	Western Michigan
TE	Quintin Morris	Bowling Green
QB	Dustin Crum	Kent State
RB	Teon Dollard	Akron
RB	Jaret Patterson	Buffalo
PK	Marshall Meeder	Central Michigan
First Team Defense
DL	Malcolm Koonce	Buffalo
DL	Ralph Holley	Western Michigan
DL	Troy Hairston	Central Michigan
DL	Mohamed Diallo	Central Michigan
OLB	Anthony Ekpe	Ball State
OLB	Troy Brown	Central Michigan
ILB	Brandon Martin	Ball State
ILB	James Patterson	Buffalo
DB	Bryce Cosby	Ball State
DB	Willie Reid	Central Michigan
DB	Noski LaFleur	Eastern Michigan
DB	Bricen Garner	Western Michigan
P	Luke Elzinga	Central Michigan
First Team Specialists
KRS	D'Wayne Eskridge	Western Michigan
KRS	Justin Hall	Ball State

Position	Player	Team
Second Team Offense
WR	Antonio Nunn	Buffalo
WR	Kalil Pimpleton	Central Michigan
WR	Jack Sorenson	Miami
WR	Skyy Moore	Western Michigan
OL	Curtis Blackwell	Ball State
OL	Jake Fuzak	Buffalo
OL	Derek Smith	Central Michigan
OL	Bill Kuduk	Kent State
OL	Jaylon Moore	Western Michigan
TE	Daniel Crawford	Northern Illinois
QB	Drew Plitt	Ball State
RB	De'Montre Tuggle	Ohio
RB	La'Darius Jefferson	Western Michigan
PK	Chad Ryland	Eastern Michigan
Second Team Defense
DL	Turan Rush	Eastern Michigan
DL	Weston Kramer	Northern Illinois
DL	Desjuan Johnson	Toledo
DL	Austin Conrad	Ohio
OLB	Christian Albright	Ball State
OLB	Jamal Hines	Toledo
ILB	Bubba Arslanian	Akron
ILB	Terry Myrick	Eastern Michigan
DB	Antonio Phillips	Ball State
DB	Jordan Gandy	Northern Illinois
DB	Tycen Anderson	Toledo
DB	Nate Bauer	Toledo
P	Nathan Snyder	Ball State
Second Team Specialists
KRS	Trayvon Rudolph	Northern Illinois
KRS	De'Montre Tuggle	Ohio

Position	Player	Team
Third Team Offense
WR	Yo'Heinz Tyler	Ball State
WR	Hassan Beydoun	Eastern Michigan
WR	Isaiah Winstead	Toledo
WR	Jaylen Hall	Western Michigan
OL	Sidy Sow	Eastern Michigan
OL	Nathan Monnin	Kent State
OL	Danny Godlevske	Miami
OL	Brayden Patton	Northern Illinois
OL	Brett Kitrell	Ohio
TE	Zac Lefebvre	Buffalo
QB	Kaleb Eleby	Western Michigan
RB	Caleb Huntley	Ball State
RB	Kevin Marks	Buffalo
PK	Alex McNulty	Buffalo
Third Team Defense
DL	Eddie Wilson	Buffalo
DL	Jose Ramirez	Eastern Michigan
DL	Kam Butler	Miami
DL	Lonnie Phelps	Miami
OLB	Kholbe Coleman	Bowling Green
ILB	Jaylin Thomas	Ball State
ILB	Kyle Pugh	Northern Illinois
ILB	Treshaun Hayward	Western Michigan
DB	A. J. Watts	Akron
DB	Devonni Reed	Central Michigan
DB	Emmanuel Rugamba	Miami
DB	Devin Lafayette	Northern Illinois
P	Nick Mihalic	Western Michigan
Third Team Specialists
KRS	Bryson Denley	Bowling Green
KRS	Ron Cook	Buffalo

Ref:

=== All-Americans ===
The 2020 College Football All-America Teams are composed of the following College Football All-American first teams chosen by the following selector organizations: Associated Press (AP), Football Writers Association of America (FWAA), American Football Coaches Association (AFCA), Walter Camp Foundation (WCFF), The Sporting News (TSN), Sports Illustrated (SI), USA Today (USAT) ESPN, CBS Sports (CBS), FOX Sports (FOX) College Football News (CFN), Bleacher Report (BR), Scout.com, Phil Steele (PS), SB Nation (SB), Athlon Sports, Pro Football Focus (PFF) and Yahoo! Sports (Yahoo!).

Currently, the NCAA compiles consensus all-America teams in the sports of Division I-FBS football and Division I men's basketball using a point system computed from All-America teams named by coaches associations or media sources. The system consists of three points for a first-team honor, two points for second-team honor, and one point for third-team honor. Honorable mention and fourth team or lower recognitions are not accorded any points. Football consensus teams are compiled by position and the player accumulating the most points at each position is named first team consensus all-American. Currently, the NCAA recognizes All-Americans selected by the AP, AFCA, FWAA, TSN, and the WCFF to determine Consensus and Unanimous All-Americans. Any player named to the First Team by all five of the NCAA-recognized selectors is deemed a Unanimous All-American.

Position	Player	School	Selector	Unanimous	Consensus
First Team All-Americans
RB	Jaret Patterson	Buffalo	Athletic, USAT		

Position	Player	School	Selector	Unanimous	Consensus
Second Team All-Americans
RB	Jaret Patterson	Buffalo	AFCA, AP, CBS, FWAA, TSN		
OL	Kayode Awosika	Buffalo	FWAA		
AP	D'Wayne Eskridge	Western Michigan	FWAA		

== NFL draft ==
The following list includes all MAC players drafted in the 2021 NFL draft

Round #	Pick #	NFL team	Player	Position	College
2	56	Seattle Seahawks	D'Wayne Eskridge	WR	Western Michigan
3	79	Las Vegas Raiders	Malcolm Koonce	DE	Buffalo
5	155	San Francisco 49ers	Jaylon Moore	OG	Western Michigan
5	161	Buffalo Bills	Tommy Doyle	OT	Miami (OH)
