= Christian Albright =

American football player (born 1999)

No. 97
- Position: Defensive lineman

Personal information
- Born: March 29, 1999 (age 27); Acworth, Georgia, U.S.
- Listed height: 6 ft 2 in (1.88 m)
- Listed weight: 240 lb (109 kg)

Career information
- High school: North Cobb (Kennesaw, Georgia)
- College: Ball State (2017–2021)
- NFL draft: 2022: undrafted

Career history
- 2022: Chicago Bears*
- 2023–2024: Saskatchewan Roughriders
- 2025: Ottawa Redblacks*
- * Offseason or practice squad member only

Awards and highlights
- Second-team All-MAC (2020); Third-team All-MAC (2018)
- Stats at CFL.ca

Christian Albright (born March 29, 1999) is an American former professional football defensive lineman who played for the Saskatchewan Roughriders of the Canadian Football League (CFL). He played college football at Ball State. He was also a member of the Chicago Bears of the National Football League (NFL) and the Ottawa Redblacks of the CFL.

== Early life ==
Albright was born on March 29, 1999, in Acworth, Georgia. He played high school football at North Cobb High School in Kennesaw, Georgia, and was a four-year letterman. He recorded 77 tackles, 12 sacks and two interceptions his senior year, earning Atlanta Journal-Constitution first-team all-state honors. He originally committed to UNC Charlotte, but later switched after receiving an offer from Ball State.

== College career ==
Albright played college football for the Ball State Cardinals from 2017 to 2021.

Albright played in 12 games, starting three at defensive end, his freshman year in 2017, totaling 26 tackles, two sacks, one forced fumble, one interception, and two pass breakups. He started all 12 games at linebacker in 2018, accumulating 67 tackles, 5.5 sacks, four forced fumbles, one interception, and three pass breakups while garnering third-team All-Mid-American Conference (MAC) recognition. He led the team in sacks and forced fumbles that season.

Albright started all 12 games at linebacker again in 2019, recording 71 tackles, 3.5 sacks, two forced fumbles, one fumble recovery, and four pass breakups. He led the team in forced fumbles for the second consecutive season. He started all eight games at linebacker during the COVID-19–shortened team's 2020 season, recording 31 tackles, three sacks, one pass breakup, one forced fumble, and two fumble recoveries, one of which he returned for a touchdown during the MAC Championship Game victory over the Buffalo Bulls. Albright was also named second-team All-MAC in 2020.

He started all 13 games during his fifth season of college football in 2021, recording 65 tackles, 2.5 sacks, one forced fumble, and three pass breakups. Albright started 48 straight games during his college career.

== Professional career ==
=== Chicago Bears ===
After going undrafted in the 2022 NFL draft, Albright signed with the Chicago Bears on May 9, 2022. He was waived/injured on August 6 and reverted to injured reserve the next day. On August 11, 2022, he was waived from injured reserve with an injury settlement.

=== Saskatchewan Roughriders ===
Albright was signed by the Saskatchewan Roughriders of the Canadian Football League (CFL) on February 6, 2023. He was moved to the practice roster on June 4, and was promoted to the active roster on September 21. Albright made his CFL debut on September 22 against the Ottawa Redblacks, and totaled two tackles, two sacks and one forced fumble. For his performance in his CFL debut, he was named the CFL run defender of the week for Week 16 by Pro Football Focus. Overall, he dressed in four games, starting three, for the Roughriders in 2023, recording four defensive tackles, two special teams tackles, three sacks, and one forced fumble before being placed on injured reserve on October 20, 2023.

Albright dressed in the first four games of the 2024 season, posting two defensive tackles and one special teams tackle, before being placed on the six-game injured list on July 12, 2024.

=== Ottawa Redblacks ===
On February 11, 2025, it was announced that the Ottawa Redblacks had signed Albright to a one-year contract. He retired on May 9, 2025.
