= Drew Plitt =

American football player (born 1998)

No. 7
- Position: Quarterback

Personal information
- Born: January 9, 1998 (age 28); Loveland, Ohio, U.S.
- Listed height: 6 ft 2 in (1.88 m)
- Listed weight: 206 lb (93 kg)

Career information
- High school: Loveland (Loveland, Ohio)
- College: Ball State (2016–2021)
- NFL draft: 2022: undrafted

Career history
- Cincinnati Bengals (2022)*; Arlington Renegades (2023); Cincinnati Bengals (2023)*; Arlington Renegades (2024)*; St. Louis Battlehawks (2024)
- * Offseason or practice squad member only

Awards and highlights
- XFL champion (2023); Second-team All-MAC (2020)
- Stats at Pro Football Reference

Drew Plitt (born January 9, 1998) is an American former professional football quarterback. He played college football for the Ball State Cardinals.

== Early life ==
Plitt grew up in Loveland, Ohio, and attended Loveland High School, where he played basketball and football. As a junior, he passed for 1,346 yards and 13 touchdowns. Plitt committed to play college football for the Ball State Cardinals over offers from Eastern Michigan, Bowling Green, and Lafayette.

== College career ==
Plitt redshirted his true freshman season at Ball State. He mostly served as the Cardinals' backup during the following two seasons. Plitt passed for 2,918 yards and 24 touchdowns with seven interceptions as a redshirt junior. He completed 65.6% of his pass attempts for 2,164 yards and 17 touchdowns to six interceptions in eight games during the team's COVID-19-shortened 2020 season and was named second-team All-Mid-American Conference (MAC). Plitt was named the Offensive MVP of the 2020 MAC Championship Game after completing 20 of 32 pass attempts for 263 yards and three touchdowns and also rushing for a touchdown in the Cardinals' 38–28 win over Buffalo. He was also named the MVP of the 2020 Arizona Bowl as Ball State beat 22nd-ranked San Jose State 34–13 in the first bowl game win in program history.

Plitt decided to utilize the extra year of eligibility granted to college athletes who played in the 2020 season due to the coronavirus pandemic and return to Ball State for a sixth season. In his final season, he passed for 2,541 yards and 18 touchdowns while also rushing for 131 yards and two touchdowns.

College Stats
General					Passing								Rushing			
Year	Team	GP	GS	Record	Cmp	Att	Pct	Yds	Avg	TD	INT	Rtg	Att	Yds	Avg	TD
2016	Ball State	0	0	-	Did Not Play - Redshirted											
2017	Ball State	5	3	0-3	42	84	50.0	430	5.1	3	3	97.6	34	29	0.9	1
2018	Ball State	8	3	1-2	85	131	64.9	1,008	7.7	6	8	132.4	36	43	1.2	2
2019	Ball State	12	12	5-7	238	370	64.3	2,918	7.9	24	7	148.2	91	171	1.9	5
2020	Ball State	8	8	7-1	164	250	65.6	2,154	8.6	17	6	155.6	80	49	0.6	4
2021	Ball State	13	13	6-7	248	411	60.3	2,541	6.2	18	6	123.8	81	131	1.6	2
Career		33	26	19-20	777	1,246	62.4	9,051	7.3	68	30	136.6	322	423	1.3	14

== Professional career ==
Pre-draft measurables
Height	Weight	Arm length	Hand span	40-yard dash	10-yard split	20-yard split	20-yard shuttle	Three-cone drill	Vertical jump	Broad jump
6 ft 2 1/4 in (1.89 m)	206 lb (93 kg)	32 1/2 in (0.83 m)	9 1/8 in (0.23 m)	4.99 s	1.68 s	2.79 s	4.64 s	7.22 s	30.5 in (0.77 m)	9 ft 5 in (2.87 m)
All values from Pro Day

=== Cincinnati Bengals (first stint) ===
Plitt went unselected in the 2022 NFL draft and participated in minicamps as a tryout player for several teams, including for the Cincinnati Bengals in May 2022. The Bengals eventually signed him as an undrafted free agent on July 27. In the team's preseason opener against the Arizona Cardinals, Plitt completed all six of his pass attempts for 76 yards and one touchdown to register a perfect passer rating of 158.3. Plitt was waived by the Bengals on August 23, 2022.

=== Arlington Renegades (first stint) ===
Plitt was assigned to the Arlington Renegades of the XFL on November 15, 2022. He was placed on the reserve list by the team on April 3, 2023, due to a knee injury. He finished the season with five games played, three starts, 63 completions for 100 attempts, 668 passing yards, three touchdowns, five interceptions, and a 71.6 QBR. He was activated off of the reserve list on May 16. Plitt was released from his contract on November 20.

=== Cincinnati Bengals (second stint) ===
After a season ending injury to Joe Burrow, the Bengals signed Plitt to their practice squad on November 20, 2023. He was not signed to a reserve/future contract after the season and thus became a free agent when his practice squad contract expired.

=== Arlington Renegades (second stint) ===
On February 8, 2024, Plitt re-signed with the Renegades. He was released by the Renegades on March 10.

=== St. Louis Battlehawks ===
On May 16, 2024, Plitt signed with the St. Louis Battlehawks of the United Football League(UFL). He was released by the Battlehawks on May 22.

=== Professional statistics ===
Year	League	Team	Games		Passing								Rushing			
Year	League	Team	GP	GS	Cmp	Att	Pct	Yds	Y/A	TD	Int	Rtg	Att	Yds	Avg	TD
2023	XFL	ARL	5	3	63	100	63.0	668	6.7	3	5	71.6	14	57	4.1	0
