= 2020 Miami RedHawks football team =

American college football season

2020 Miami RedHawks football
- Conference: Mid-American Conference
- East Division
- Record: 2–1 (2–1 MAC)
- Head coach: Chuck Martin (7th season)
- Co-offensive coordinators: George Barnett (7th season); Eric Koehler (7th season)
- Offensive scheme: Multiple
- Co-defensive coordinators: John Hauser (5th season); Spence Nowinsky (3rd season)
- Base defense: 4–3
- Home stadium: Yager Stadium

2020 Mid-American Conference football standings
	Conf.			Overall
Team	W		L	W		L
East Division
No. 25 Buffalo xy	5	–	0	6	–	1
Kent State	3	–	1	3	–	1
Ohio	2	–	1	2	–	1
Miami (OH)	2	–	1	2	–	1
Akron	1	–	5	1	–	5
Bowling Green	0	–	5	0	–	5
West Division
No. 23 Ball State xy$	5	–	1	7	–	1
Western Michigan	4	–	2	4	–	2
Toledo	4	–	2	4	–	2
Central Michigan	3	–	3	3	–	3
Eastern Michigan	2	–	4	2	–	4
Northern Illinois	0	–	6	0	–	6
Championship: Ball State 38, Buffalo 28
$ – Conference champion; x – Division champion/co-champions; y – Championship game participant; Note: Due to COVID-19, the Mid-American suspended the season on August 8, but later decided to begin play on November 4.; Rankings from AP Poll.

The 2020 Miami RedHawks football team represented Miami University in the 2020 NCAA Division I FBS football season. They were led by seventh-year head coach Chuck Martin and played their home games at Yager Stadium in Oxford, Ohio, as members of the East Division of the Mid-American Conference.

== Preseason ==
=== Award watch lists ===
Listed in the order that they were released

Award	Player	Position	Year
Chuck Bednarik Award	Sterling Weatherford	DB	RS JR
Jim Thorpe Award	Emmanuel Rugamba	DB	RS SR
Jim Thorpe Award	Sterling Weatherford	DB	RS JR
Outland Trophy	Tommy Doyle	OL	RS SR
Wuerffel Trophy	Jack Sorenson	WR	RS SR

== Schedule ==
Miami had a game scheduled against Arkansas–Pine Bluff, but it was canceled due to the COVID-19 pandemic.

Date	Time	Opponent	Site	TV	Result	Attendance
November 4	7:00 p.m.	Ball State	Yager Stadium; Oxford, OH	CBSSN	W 38–31	0
November 10	8:00 p.m.	at Buffalo	University at Buffalo Stadium; Amherst, NY	ESPN	L 10–42	0
November 28	1:00 p.m.	at Akron	InfoCision Stadium–Summa Field; Akron, OH	ESPN3	W 38–7	0
All times are in Eastern time

== Players drafted into the NFL ==
Round	Pick	Player	Position	NFL Club
5	161	Tommy Doyle	OT	Buffalo Bills
