= 2020 MAC Championship Game =

2020 Rocket Mortgage MAC Championship Game
- Conference Championship
| Ball State Cardinals | Buffalo Bulls |
| (5–1) | (5–0) |
| 38 | 28 |
| Head coach: Mike Neu | Head coach: Lance Leipold |
| | AP / Coaches / CFP; 23 / NR / NR |
| | 1 | 2 | 3 | 4 | Total |
|---|---|---|---|---|---|
| Ball State | 7 | 28 | 3 | 0 | 38 |
| Buffalo | 14 | 7 | 7 | 0 | 28 |
- Date: December 18, 2020
- Season: 2020
- Stadium: Ford Field
- Location: Detroit, Michigan
- MVP: Offense: Drew Plitt (QB, Ball State); Defense: Jimmy Daw (LB, Ball State)
- Favorite: Buffalo by 13
- Referee: Tom Stapleton

United States TV coverage
- Network: ESPN
- Announcers: Clay Matvick (play-by-play), Rocky Boiman (analyst) and Katie George (sideline)

2020 Mid-American Conference football standings
| | Conf. | | | Overall |
| Team | W | | L | W | | L |
|---|---|---|---|---|---|---|
East Division
| No. 25 Buffalo xy | 5 | – | 0 | 6 | – | 1 |
| Kent State | 3 | – | 1 | 3 | – | 1 |
| Ohio | 2 | – | 1 | 2 | – | 1 |
| Miami (OH) | 2 | – | 1 | 2 | – | 1 |
| Akron | 1 | – | 5 | 1 | – | 5 |
| Bowling Green | 0 | – | 5 | 0 | – | 5 |
West Division
| No. 23 Ball State xy$ | 5 | – | 1 | 7 | – | 1 |
| Western Michigan | 4 | – | 2 | 4 | – | 2 |
| Toledo | 4 | – | 2 | 4 | – | 2 |
| Central Michigan | 3 | – | 3 | 3 | – | 3 |
| Eastern Michigan | 2 | – | 4 | 2 | – | 4 |
| Northern Illinois | 0 | – | 6 | 0 | – | 6 |
Championship: Ball State 38, Buffalo 28
$ – Conference champion; x – Division champion/co-champions; y – Championship game participant; Note: Due to COVID-19, the Mid-American suspended the season on August 8, but later decided to begin play on November 4.; Rankings from AP Poll.

The 2020 MAC Championship Game was a college football game played on Friday, December 18, 2020, at Ford Field in Detroit, Michigan, to determine the 2020 champion of the Mid-American Conference (MAC). The game was contested by the Buffalo Bulls, East Division champions, and the Ball State Cardinals, West Division champions. Sponsored by mortgage lending company Quicken Loans through their Rocket Mortgage brand, the game was officially known as the Rocket Mortgage MAC Championship Game. Ball State defeated Buffalo, 38–28 to claim their first MAC championship since 1996.

== Teams ==
=== Ball State ===
Ball State entered the championship game as West Division champions, having compiled a 5–1 record, all in conference games. After losing their first game of the season to Miami (OH), the Cardinals won five consecutive games leading up to the conference championship game. Ball State's only prior appearance in the MAC Championship Game had been a loss to Buffalo in the 2008 edition.

=== Buffalo ===
Buffalo entered the championship game as East Division champions, having compiled a 5–0 record, all in conference games. The Bulls scored at least 42 points in each of their five games, winning each game by at least 19 points. Buffalo's two prior appearances in the MAC Championship Game had been a win over Ball State in 2008 and a loss to Northern Illinois in the 2018 edition.

== Game summary ==
2020 Rocket Mortgage MAC Championship Game

| Quarter | 1 | 2 | 3 | 4 | Total |
|---|---|---|---|---|---|
| Ball State | 7 | 28 | 3 | 0 | 38 |
| Buffalo | 14 | 7 | 7 | 0 | 28 |

at Ford Field • Detroit, Michigan

- Date: Friday, December 18, 2020
- Game time: 7:30 p.m. EST (6:30 p.m. CST)
- Game weather: n/a (indoor stadium)
- Referee: Tom Stapleton
- TV announcers (ESPN): Clay Matvick (play-by-play), Rocky Boiman (analyst) and Katie George (sideline)

Game information

First quarter

- (11:59) UB – Jaret Patterson 3 yard rush, Alex McNulty kick (Drive: 6 plays, 71 yards, 3:01; Buffalo 7–0)
- (7:47) BALL – Yo'Heinz Tyler 10 yard pass from Drew Plitt, Jack Knight kick (Drive: 11 yards, 75 yards, 4:12; Tied 7–7)
- (3:41) UB – Trevor Wilson 24 yard pass from Kyle Vantrease, Alex McNulty kick (Drive: 8 plays, 69 yards, 4:06; Buffalo 14–7)

Second quarter

- (8:49) BALL – Drew Plitt 1 yard rush, Jacob Lewis kick (Drive: 10 plays, 80 yards, 3:03; Tied 14–14)
- (7:31) UB – Kyle Vantrease 1 yard rush, Alex McNulty kick (Drive: 3 plays, 76 yards, 1:18; Buffalo 21–14)
- (5:55) BALL – Justin Hall 9 yard pass from Drew Plitt, Jacob Lewis kick (Drive: 6 plays, 75 yards, 1:36; Tied 21–21)
- (1:30) BALL – Jalen McGaughy 56 yard pass from Drew Plitt, Jacob Lewis kick (Drive: 6 plays, 83 yards, 2:42; Ball State 28–21)
- (0:48) BALL – Christian Albright 34 yard fumble return, Jacob Lewis kick (Ball State 35–21)

Third quarter

- (9:10) BALL – Jacob Lewis 21 yard field goal (Drive: 16 plays, 76 yards, 5:50; Ball State 38–21)
- (1:16) UB – Kevin Marks Jr. 67 yard rush, Alex McNulty kick (Drive: 2 plays, 78 yards, 0:25; Ball State 38–28)

Fourth quarter
No scoring plays

=== Statistics ===
| Statistics | BALL | UB |
|---|---|---|
| First downs | 22 | 23 |
| Plays–yards | 79–429 | 71–499 |
| Rushes–yards | 47–166 | 29–134 |
| Passing yards | 263 | 365 |
| Passing: comp–att–int | 20–32–1 | 29–42–1 |
| Time of possession | 32:39 | 27:21 |

| Team | Category | Player | Statistics |
|---|---|---|---|
| Ball State | Passing | Drew Plitt | 20/32, 263 yards, 3 TD, 1 INT |
| Ball State | Rushing | Tye Evans | 18 carries, 94 yards |
| Ball State | Receiving | Yo'Heinz Tyler | 6 receptions, 91 yards, 1 TD |
| Buffalo | Passing | Kyle Vantrease | 29/42, 365 yards, 1 TD, 1 INT |
| Buffalo | Rushing | Kevin Marks Jr. | 9 carries, 93 yards, 1 TD |
| Buffalo | Receiving | Antonio Nunn | 13 carries, 182 yards |

== See also ==
- List of Mid-American Conference football champions
