= De'Montre Tuggle =

American football player (born 1999)

No. 16
- Position: Running back

Personal information
- Born: March 29, 1999 (age 27); Houston, Texas, U.S.
- Listed height: 5 ft 10 in (1.78 m)
- Listed weight: 198 lb (90 kg)

Career information
- High school: Channelview (Channelview, Texas)
- College: Kilgore College (2017–2018); Ohio University (2019–2021)
- NFL draft: 2022: undrafted

Career history
- 2022: Chicago Bears*
- 2022: Arlington Renegades*
- 2023: Ottawa Redblacks
- 2023: Hamilton Tiger-Cats*
- * Offseason or practice squad member only

Awards and highlights
- Second-team All-MAC (2020)
- Stats at CFL.ca

De'Montre Tuggle (born March 29, 1999) is an American former professional football running back who played for the Ottawa Redblacks of the Canadian Football League (CFL). He played college football at Kilgore College and Ohio University. He was also a member of the Chicago Bears of the National Football League (NFL), the Arlington Renegades of the XFL, and the Hamilton Tiger-Cats of the CFL.

== Early life ==
Tuggle was born on March 29, 1999. He played high school football at Channelview High School in Channelview, Texas, and was a two-time first-team all-district honoree. He rushed for 1,200 yards his junior year and 1,400 yards his senior year.

== College career ==
Tuggle played college football at Kilgore College of the National Junior College Athletic Association from 2017 to 2018. He played in nine games as a freshman in 2017, rushing for 297 yards and two touchdowns while also catching five passes for 55 yards and one touchdown. He appeared in 12 games in 2018, rushing for 883 yards and seven touchdowns while recording 16 receptions for 320 yards and five touchdowns. Tuggle was named second-team all-Southwest Conference for 2018.

Tuggle then played for the Ohio Bobcats from 2019 to 2021. He played in 12 games, starting one, in 2019, totaling 644 rushing yards and 11 rushing touchdowns while also catching 16 passes for 121 yards and one touchdown. He started all three games for the Bobcats during the COVID-19–shortened team's 2020 season, rushing 53 times for 403 yards (7.6 per carry) and six touchdowns while also returning four kicks for 180 yards and one touchdown. For his performance during the 2020 season, he earned second-team all-Mid-American Conference honors on both offense and special teams. Tuggle played in all 12 games in 2021, rushing for 791 yards and 7 touchdowns, catching 14 passes for 150 yards and two touchdowns, and returning 24 kicks for 495 yards and one touchdown.

== Professional career ==
Pre-draft measurables
Height	Weight	Arm length	Hand span	40-yard dash	10-yard split	20-yard split	20-yard shuttle	Three-cone drill	Vertical jump	Broad jump	Bench press
5 ft 8 1/2 in (1.74 m)	206 lb (93 kg)	31 in (0.79 m)	9 in (0.23 m)	4.59 s	1.59 s	2.60 s	4.20 s	7.03 s	35.5 in (0.90 m)	9 ft 9 in (2.97 m)	19 reps
All values from Pro Day

After going undrafted in the 2022 NFL draft, Tuggle signed with the Chicago Bears on May 9, 2022. He appeared in three preseason games for the Bears, totaling 21 rushing attempts for 71 yards. He was waived on August 30, 2022.

In November 2022, Tuggle was selected by the Arlington Renegades in the 2023 XFL draft. He was released on February 8, 2023.

Tuggle signed with the Ottawa Redblacks of the Canadian Football League (CFL) on May 1, 2023. He was moved between the practice roster and active roster several times during the 2023 season. He was named the CFL running back of the week by Pro Football Focus for Week 4 after totaling 17 carries for 126 yards and one touchdown. Overall, Tuggle dressed in four games, starting three, for the Redblacks in 2023, accumulating 32 carries for 176 yards and one touchdown while also recording seven receptions for 58 yards. Tuggle was released by the Redblacks on October 29, 2023.

Tuggle was signed to the practice roster of the Hamilton Tiger-Cats of the CFL on October 31, 2023. He was released on November 5, 2023.
