= Troy Hairston =

American football player (born 1998)

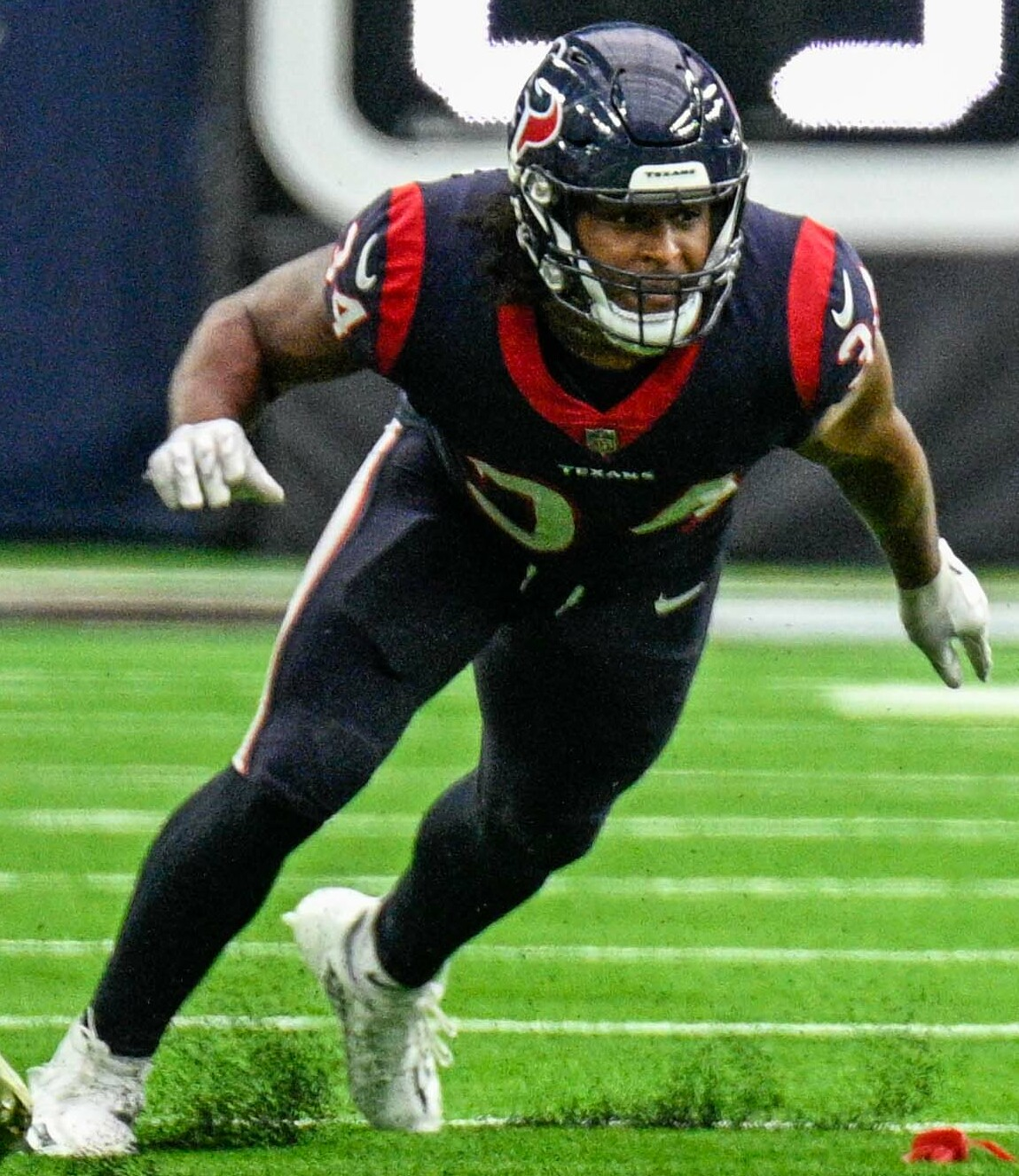
- Hairston with the Houston Texans in 2022

Profile
- Position: Fullback

Personal information
- Born: December 8, 1998 (age 27); Detroit, Michigan, U.S.
- Listed height: 5 ft 11 in (1.80 m)
- Listed weight: 245 lb (111 kg)

Career information
- High school: Seaholm (Birmingham, Michigan)
- College: Central Michigan (2018–2021)
- NFL draft: 2022: undrafted

Career history
- Houston Texans (2022–2024); Cleveland Browns (2025)*
- * Offseason or practice squad member only

Awards and highlights
- MAC co-Defensive Player of the Year (2020); 2× First-team All-MAC (2020, 2021)

Career NFL statistics as of 2023
- Receptions: 5
- Receiving yards: 19
- Stats at Pro Football Reference

Troy Hairston II (born December 8, 1998) is an American professional football fullback. He played college football for the Central Michigan Chippewas as a linebacker and defensive end and was signed by the Houston Texans as an undrafted free agent in 2022.

== Early life and education ==
Hairston was born on December 8, 1998, in Detroit, Michigan. He is of Panamanian descent through his mother. He attended Seaholm High School and committed to Central Michigan University. In 2018, his first year on the football team, Hairston appeared in 11 games and recorded five tackles, four solo. In 2019, he played in all 14 games and started two, recording 28 tackles, 15 of which were solo. He also recorded five TFLs and two quarterback sacks as well as two quarterback hurries. Against Western Michigan, he was named a game captain.

In 2020, Hairston earned co-Mid-American Conference (MAC) Defensive Player of the Year honors after leading the conference with 5.5. sacks and 12 TFLs. He was named to the All-MAC first-team by Phil Steele and was named to the third-team by Pro Football Focus. At Eastern Michigan on November 27, he made a career-high 11 tackles (1.5 for-loss) and recovered a fumble. On December 12, against Toledo, he made seven tackles and two sacks with three TFLs.

In the 2021 season, Hairston started all 13 games and led the team in TFLs with 17 and sacks with nine. His TFLs total ranked 13th nationally, and with 55 total tackles, he placed fifth on the team. He recorded at least five tackles in eight games, at least one sack in six games, and at least two TFLs in five games. He earned All-MAC first-team honors, as well as second-team placement by Phil Steele and Pro Football Focus.

== Professional career ==
Pre-draft measurables
Height	Weight	Arm length	Hand span	40-yard dash	10-yard split	20-yard split	20-yard shuttle	Three-cone drill	Vertical jump	Broad jump	Bench press
5 ft 10 1/2 in (1.79 m)	231 lb (105 kg)	31 3/4 in (0.81 m)	10 in (0.25 m)	4.76 s	1.72 s	2.74 s	4.08 s	6.82 s	32.5 in (0.83 m)	9 ft 4 in (2.84 m)	30 reps
All values from Pro Day

=== Houston Texans ===
After going unselected in the 2022 NFL draft, Hairston was signed by the Houston Texans as an undrafted free agent. After joining the Texans, Hariston switched his position to fullback during training camp and beat out veteran Andy Janovich to make the Texans' 53-man roster. Hariston was one of three undrafted free agents to make the team's 53-man roster in 2022.

On August 1, 2023, Hairston was placed on injured reserve with a herniated disc.

Hairston was released by the Texans on August 27, 2024, and re-signed to the practice squad.

=== Cleveland Browns ===
On January 28, 2025, Hairston signed a reserve/future contract with the Cleveland Browns. He was waived on August 3, 2025.
