= 2020 Central Michigan Chippewas football team =

American college football season

2020 Central Michigan Chippewas football
- Conference: Mid-American Conference
- West Division
- Record: 3–3 (3–3 MAC)
- Head coach: Jim McElwain (2nd season)
- Offensive coordinator: Charlie Frye (2nd season)
- Offensive scheme: Spread
- Defensive coordinator: Robb Akey (2nd season)
- Base defense: 4–3
- Home stadium: Kelly/Shorts Stadium

Uniform
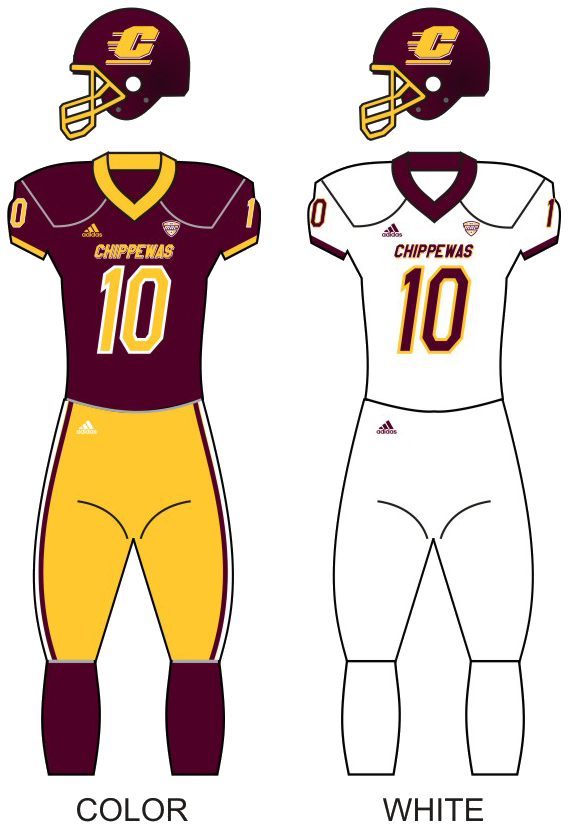

2020 Mid-American Conference football standings
	Conf.			Overall
Team	W		L	W		L
East Division
No. 25 Buffalo xy	5	–	0	6	–	1
Kent State	3	–	1	3	–	1
Ohio	2	–	1	2	–	1
Miami (OH)	2	–	1	2	–	1
Akron	1	–	5	1	–	5
Bowling Green	0	–	5	0	–	5
West Division
No. 23 Ball State xy$	5	–	1	7	–	1
Western Michigan	4	–	2	4	–	2
Toledo	4	–	2	4	–	2
Central Michigan	3	–	3	3	–	3
Eastern Michigan	2	–	4	2	–	4
Northern Illinois	0	–	6	0	–	6
Championship: Ball State 38, Buffalo 28
$ – Conference champion; x – Division champion/co-champions; y – Championship game participant; Note: Due to COVID-19, the Mid-American suspended the season on August 8, but later decided to begin play on November 4.; Rankings from AP Poll.

The 2020 Central Michigan Chippewas football team represented Central Michigan University in the 2020 NCAA Division I FBS football season. They were led by second-year head coach Jim McElwain, and played their home games at Kelly/Shorts Stadium, as members of the West Division of the Mid-American Conference.

== Schedule ==
Central Michigan had games scheduled against Nebraska and Northwestern, which were canceled due to the COVID-19 pandemic.

Date	Time	Opponent	Site	TV	Result	Attendance
November 4	7:00 p.m.	Ohio	Kelly/Shorts Stadium; Mount Pleasant, MI	ESPN	W 30–27	757
November 11	8:00 p.m.	at Northern Illinois	Huskie Stadium; DeKalb, IL	ESPNU	W 40–10	419
November 18	7:00 p.m.	Western Michigan	Kelly/Shorts Stadium; Mount Pleasant, MI (rivalry)	ESPN2	L 44–52	0
November 27	4:00 p.m.	at Eastern Michigan	Rynearson Stadium; Ypsilanti, MI (rivalry)	CBSSN	W 31–23	300
December 5	5:30 p.m.	Ball State	Kelly/Shorts Stadium; Mount Pleasant, MI	ESPNU	L 20–45	0
December 12	3:00 p.m.	at Toledo	Glass Bowl; Toledo, OH	ESPN3	L 23–24	0
All times are in Eastern time

== Game summaries ==
=== Ohio ===
	1	2	3	4	Total
Bobcats	7	13	7	0	27
Chippewas	14	6	7	3	30

=== At Northern Illinois ===
	1	2	3	4	Total
Chippewas	7	2	17	14	40
Huskies	0	0	0	10	10

=== Western Michigan ===
	1	2	3	4	Total
Broncos	14	17	14	7	52
Chippewas	14	0	16	14	44

=== At Eastern Michigan ===
	1	2	3	4	Total
Chippewas	6	0	0	25	31
Eagles	7	10	3	3	23

=== Ball State ===
	1	2	3	4	Total
Cardinals	10	14	14	7	45
Chippewas	0	7	7	6	20

=== At Toledo ===
	1	2	3	4	Total
Chippewas	7	3	13	0	23
Rockets	10	7	0	7	24
