= 2020 Kent State Golden Flashes football team =

American college football season

2020 Kent State Golden Flashes football
- Conference: Mid-American Conference
- East Division
- Record: 3–1 (3–1 MAC)
- Head coach: Sean Lewis (3rd season)
- Offensive coordinator: Andrew Sowder (3rd season)
- Offensive scheme: Veer and shoot
- Defensive coordinator: Tom Kaufman (3rd season)
- Base defense: 3–4
- Home stadium: Dix Stadium

2020 Mid-American Conference football standings
	Conf.			Overall
Team	W		L	W		L
East Division
No. 25 Buffalo xy	5	–	0	6	–	1
Kent State	3	–	1	3	–	1
Ohio	2	–	1	2	–	1
Miami (OH)	2	–	1	2	–	1
Akron	1	–	5	1	–	5
Bowling Green	0	–	5	0	–	5
West Division
No. 23 Ball State xy$	5	–	1	7	–	1
Western Michigan	4	–	2	4	–	2
Toledo	4	–	2	4	–	2
Central Michigan	3	–	3	3	–	3
Eastern Michigan	2	–	4	2	–	4
Northern Illinois	0	–	6	0	–	6
Championship: Ball State 38, Buffalo 28
$ – Conference champion; x – Division champion/co-champions; y – Championship game participant; Note: Due to COVID-19, the Mid-American suspended the season on August 8, but later decided to begin play on November 4.; Rankings from AP Poll.

The 2020 Kent State Golden Flashes football team represented Kent State University in the 2020 NCAA Division I FBS football season. They were led by third-year head coach Sean Lewis and played their home games at Dix Stadium in Kent, Ohio, as members of the East Division of the Mid-American Conference.

== Schedule ==
Kent State had games scheduled against Alabama, Kentucky, and Penn State, which were canceled due to the COVID-19 pandemic.

Date	Time	Opponent	Site	TV	Result	Attendance
November 4	6:00 p.m.	Eastern Michigan	Dix Stadium; Kent, OH	ESPN+	W 27–23	100
November 10	7:00 p.m.	at Bowling Green	Doyt Perry Stadium; Bowling Green, OH (Anniversary Award)	ESPN2	W 62–24	1,500
November 17	8:00 p.m.	Akron	Dix Stadium; Kent, OH (Wagon Wheel)	ESPN	W 69–35	100
November 28	12:00 p.m.	at Buffalo	University at Buffalo Stadium; Amherst, NY	CBSSN	L 41–70	0
All times are in Eastern time
