= 2020 Toledo Rockets football team =

American college football season

2020 Toledo Rockets football
- Conference: Mid-American Conference
- West Division
- Record: 4–2 (4–2 MAC)
- Head coach: Jason Candle (5th season)
- Co-offensive coordinators: Mike Hallett (1st season); Robert Weiner (1st season)
- Offensive scheme: Spread
- Defensive coordinator: Vince Kehres (1st season)
- Co-defensive coordinators: Ross Watson (1st season); Craig Kuligowski (1st season)
- Base defense: 4–2–5
- Home stadium: Glass Bowl

2020 Mid-American Conference football standings
| | Conf. | | | Overall |
| Team | W | | L | W | | L |
|---|---|---|---|---|---|---|
East Division
| No. 25 Buffalo xy | 5 | – | 0 | 6 | – | 1 |
| Kent State | 3 | – | 1 | 3 | – | 1 |
| Ohio | 2 | – | 1 | 2 | – | 1 |
| Miami (OH) | 2 | – | 1 | 2 | – | 1 |
| Akron | 1 | – | 5 | 1 | – | 5 |
| Bowling Green | 0 | – | 5 | 0 | – | 5 |
West Division
| No. 23 Ball State xy$ | 5 | – | 1 | 7 | – | 1 |
| Western Michigan | 4 | – | 2 | 4 | – | 2 |
| Toledo | 4 | – | 2 | 4 | – | 2 |
| Central Michigan | 3 | – | 3 | 3 | – | 3 |
| Eastern Michigan | 2 | – | 4 | 2 | – | 4 |
| Northern Illinois | 0 | – | 6 | 0 | – | 6 |
Championship: Ball State 38, Buffalo 28
$ – Conference champion; x – Division champion/co-champions; y – Championship game participant; Note: Due to COVID-19, the Mid-American suspended the season on August 8, but later decided to begin play on November 4.; Rankings from AP Poll.

The 2020 Toledo Rockets football team represented the University of Toledo during the 2020 NCAA Division I FBS football season. The Rockets were led by fifth-year head coach Jason Candle and played their home games at the Glass Bowl in Toledo, Ohio. They competed as members of the West Division of the Mid-American Conference (MAC).

== Schedule ==
Toledo had a game scheduled against Michigan State on September 19, which was canceled due to the COVID-19 pandemic. On August 8, 2020, the Mid-American Conference announced a cancellation of the fall football season, citing health and safety concerns due to the COVID-19 pandemic. The announcement also stated the intention for the conference to attempt to play the season in spring instead, as opposed to completely cancelling the 2020 season.

| Date | Time | Opponent | Site | TV | Result | Attendance |
|---|---|---|---|---|---|---|
| November 4 | 8:00 p.m. | Bowling Green | Glass Bowl; Toledo, OH (Battle of I-75) | ESPNU | W 38–3 | 0 |
| November 11 | 8:00 p.m. | at Western Michigan | Waldo Stadium; Kalamazoo, MI | ESPN | L 38–41 | 0 |
| November 18 | 7:00 p.m. | at Eastern Michigan | Rynearson Stadium; Ypsilanti, MI | CBSSN | W 45–28 | 0 |
| November 28 | 12:00 p.m. | Ball State | Glass Bowl; Toledo, OH | ESPN3 | L 24–27 | 0 |
| December 5 | 12:00 p.m. | at Northern Illinois | Huskie Stadium; DeKalb, IL | ESPN3 | W 41–24 | 0 |
| December 12 | 3:00 p.m. | Central Michigan | Glass Bowl; Toledo, OH | ESPN3 | W 24–23 | 0 |
Rankings from AP Poll and CFP Rankings (after November 24) released prior to game; All times are in Eastern time
