= 2020 Northern Illinois Huskies football team =

American college football season

2020 Northern Illinois Huskies football
- Conference: Mid-American Conference
- West Division
- Record: 0–6 (0–6 MAC)
- Head coach: Thomas Hammock (2nd season)
- Offensive coordinator: Eric Eidsness (2nd season)
- Offensive scheme: Multiple
- Defensive coordinator: Derrick Jackson (2nd season)
- Base defense: 4–2–5
- MVP: Tyrice Richie
- Captains: Daniel Crawford; James Ester; Matt Ference
- Home stadium: Huskie Stadium

2020 Mid-American Conference football standings
	Conf.			Overall
Team	W		L	W		L
East Division
No. 25 Buffalo xy	5	–	0	6	–	1
Kent State	3	–	1	3	–	1
Ohio	2	–	1	2	–	1
Miami (OH)	2	–	1	2	–	1
Akron	1	–	5	1	–	5
Bowling Green	0	–	5	0	–	5
West Division
No. 23 Ball State xy$	5	–	1	7	–	1
Western Michigan	4	–	2	4	–	2
Toledo	4	–	2	4	–	2
Central Michigan	3	–	3	3	–	3
Eastern Michigan	2	–	4	2	–	4
Northern Illinois	0	–	6	0	–	6
Championship: Ball State 38, Buffalo 28
$ – Conference champion; x – Division champion/co-champions; y – Championship game participant; Note: Due to COVID-19, the Mid-American suspended the season on August 8, but later decided to begin play on November 4.; Rankings from AP Poll.

The 2020 Northern Illinois Huskies football team represented Northern Illinois University as a member of the West Division of the Mid-American Conference (MAC) during the 2020 NCAA Division I FBS football season. Led by second-year head coach Thomas Hammock in a season shorted due to the COVID-19 pandemic, the Huskies compiled an overall record of 0–6 with an identical mark in MAC play, placing last out of six teams in the West Division. It was the first winless season for the Huskies since 1997. Northern Illinois played home games at Huskie Stadium in DeKalb, Illinois.

== COVID-19 effects on season ==
On August 8, 2020, the MAC announced that it was postponing the 2020 football season due to the ongoing COVID-19 pandemic. The conference announced it would explore playing a season in the spring of 2021. It was the first major football conference to announce the postponement of the season.

On September 25, the conference voted to reinstate the football season beginning on November 4. The conference was the last major conference to reinstate football.

== Schedule ==
Northern Illinois had games scheduled against Iowa, Maryland, and Rhode Island, which were canceled due to the COVID-19 pandemic. As a result, the team played a conference-only schedule.

Date	Time	Opponent	Site	TV	Result	Attendance
November 4	7:00 p.m.	Buffalo	Huskie Stadium; DeKalb, IL	ESPN2	L 30–49	449
November 11	8:00 p.m.	Central Michigan	Huskie Stadium; DeKalb, IL	ESPNU	L 10–40	419
November 18	6:00 p.m.	at Ball State	Scheumann Stadium; Muncie, IN (Bronze Stalk Trophy)	ESPNews	L 25–31	0
November 28	11:00 a.m.	at Western Michigan	Waldo Stadium; Kalamazoo, MI	ESPN+	L 27–30	0
December 5	11:00 a.m.	Toledo	Huskie Stadium; DeKalb, IL	ESPN3	L 24–41	0
December 12	11:00 a.m.	at Eastern Michigan	Rynearson Stadium; Ypsilanti, MI	ESPN3	L 33–41	300
All times are in Eastern time
