= 2020 Eastern Michigan Eagles football team =

American college football season

2020 Eastern Michigan Eagles football
- Conference: Mid-American Conference
- West Division
- Record: 2–4 (2–4 MAC)
- Head coach: Chris Creighton (7th season)
- Offensive scheme: Multiple
- Defensive coordinator: Neal Neathery (5th season)
- Base defense: 4–2–5
- Home stadium: Rynearson Stadium

Uniform
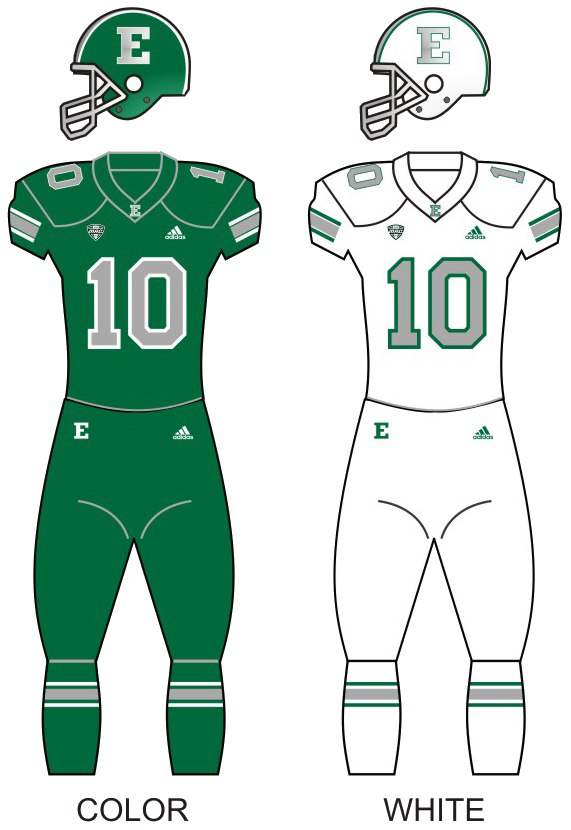

2020 Mid-American Conference football standings
	Conf.			Overall
Team	W		L	W		L
East Division
No. 25 Buffalo xy	5	–	0	6	–	1
Kent State	3	–	1	3	–	1
Ohio	2	–	1	2	–	1
Miami (OH)	2	–	1	2	–	1
Akron	1	–	5	1	–	5
Bowling Green	0	–	5	0	–	5
West Division
No. 23 Ball State xy$	5	–	1	7	–	1
Western Michigan	4	–	2	4	–	2
Toledo	4	–	2	4	–	2
Central Michigan	3	–	3	3	–	3
Eastern Michigan	2	–	4	2	–	4
Northern Illinois	0	–	6	0	–	6
Championship: Ball State 38, Buffalo 28
$ – Conference champion; x – Division champion/co-champions; y – Championship game participant; Note: Due to COVID-19, the Mid-American suspended the season on August 8, but later decided to begin play on November 4.; Rankings from AP Poll.

The 2020 Eastern Michigan Eagles football team represented Eastern Michigan University during the 2020 NCAA Division I FBS football season. The Eagles were led by seventh-year head coach Chris Creighton and played their home games at Rynearson Stadium in Ypsilanti, Michigan. They competed as members of the West Division of the Mid-American Conference (MAC).

== Preseason ==
=== Award watch lists ===
Listed in the order that they were released

Award	Player	Position	Year
John Mackey Award	Thomas Odukoya	TE	SR
Paul Hornung Award	Dylan Drummond	WR	JR
Wuerffel Trophy	Thomas Odukoya	TE	SR

== Schedule ==
Eastern Michigan had games against Kentucky and Missouri, which were canceled due to the COVID-19 pandemic.

Date	Time	Opponent	Site	TV	Result	Attendance
November 4	6:00 p.m.	at Kent State	Dix Stadium; Kent, OH	ESPN+	L 23–27	0
November 11	7:00 p.m.	at Ball State	Scheumann Stadium; Muncie, IN	CBSSN	L 31–38	1,183
November 18	7:00 p.m.	Toledo	Rynearson Stadium; Ypsilanti, MI	CBSSN	L 28–45	0
November 27	4:00 p.m.	Central Michigan	Rynearson Stadium; Ypsilanti, MI (Michigan MAC Trophy)	CBSSN	L 23–31	300
December 5	12:00 p.m.	at Western Michigan	Waldo Stadium; Kalamazoo, MI (Michigan MAC Trophy)	ESPN+	W 53–42	0
December 12	11:00 a.m.	Northern Illinois	Rynearson Stadium; Ypsilanti, MI	ESPN3	W 41–33	300
Rankings from AP Poll and CFP Rankings (after November 24) released prior to game; All times are in Eastern time
