= 2020 Bowling Green Falcons football team =

American college football season

2020 Bowling Green Falcons football
- Conference: Mid-American Conference
- East Division
- Record: 0–5 (0–5 MAC)
- Head coach: Scot Loeffler (2nd season)
- Offensive coordinator: Terry Malone (2nd season)
- Offensive scheme: Multiple
- Defensive coordinator: Brian VanGorder (2nd season)
- Base defense: 4–3
- Home stadium: Doyt Perry Stadium

2020 Mid-American Conference football standings
| | Conf. | | | Overall |
| Team | W | | L | W | | L |
|---|---|---|---|---|---|---|
East Division
| No. 25 Buffalo xy | 5 | – | 0 | 6 | – | 1 |
| Kent State | 3 | – | 1 | 3 | – | 1 |
| Ohio | 2 | – | 1 | 2 | – | 1 |
| Miami (OH) | 2 | – | 1 | 2 | – | 1 |
| Akron | 1 | – | 5 | 1 | – | 5 |
| Bowling Green | 0 | – | 5 | 0 | – | 5 |
West Division
| No. 23 Ball State xy$ | 5 | – | 1 | 7 | – | 1 |
| Western Michigan | 4 | – | 2 | 4 | – | 2 |
| Toledo | 4 | – | 2 | 4 | – | 2 |
| Central Michigan | 3 | – | 3 | 3 | – | 3 |
| Eastern Michigan | 2 | – | 4 | 2 | – | 4 |
| Northern Illinois | 0 | – | 6 | 0 | – | 6 |
Championship: Ball State 38, Buffalo 28
$ – Conference champion; x – Division champion/co-champions; y – Championship game participant; Note: Due to COVID-19, the Mid-American suspended the season on August 8, but later decided to begin play on November 4.; Rankings from AP Poll.

The 2020 Bowling Green Falcons football team represented Bowling Green State University during the 2020 NCAA Division I FBS football season. The Falcons were led by second-year head coach Scot Loeffler and played their home games at Doyt Perry Stadium in Bowling Green, Ohio. They competed as members of the East Division of the Mid-American Conference (MAC). They finished the season 0–5 in their conference-only schedule to finish in last place in the East division.

== COVID-19 effects on season ==
On August 8, 2020, the MAC announced that it was postponing the 2020 football season due to the COVID-19 pandemic. The conference announced it would explore playing a season in the spring of 2021. It was the first major football conference to announce the postponement of the season.

On September 25, the conference voted to reinstate the football season beginning on November 4. The conference was the last major conference to reinstate football.

== Schedule ==
Bowling Green had games scheduled against Illinois and Ohio State which were canceled due to the COVID-19 pandemic. The final regularly scheduled game of the season against Miami was canceled due to COVID-19 issues at Miami.

| Date | Time | Opponent | Site | TV | Result | Attendance |
|---|---|---|---|---|---|---|
| November 4 | 8:00 p.m. | at Toledo | Glass Bowl; Toledo, OH (rivalry) | ESPNU | L 3–38 | 0 |
| November 10 | 7:00 p.m. | Kent State | Doyt Perry Stadium; Bowling Green, OH (Anniversary Award) | ESPN2 | L 24–62 | 1,500 |
| November 17 | 7:00 p.m. | Buffalo | Doyt Perry Stadium; Bowling Green, OH | CBSSN | L 17–42 | 1,500 |
| November 28 | 12:00 p.m. | at Ohio | Peden Stadium; Athens, OH | ESPN3 | L 10–52 | 0 |
| December 5 | 2:00 p.m. | at Akron | InfoCision Stadium; Akron, OH | ESPN3 | L 3–31 | 0 |
Rankings from AP Poll and CFP Rankings (after November 24) released prior to game; All times are in Eastern time
