= 2020 Buffalo Bulls football team =

American college football season

2020 Buffalo Bulls football

Camellia Bowl champion MAC East Division champion

MAC Championship Game, L 28–38 vs. Ball State

Camellia Bowl, W 17–10 vs. Marshall
- Conference: Mid-American Conference
- East Division

Ranking
- Coaches: No. 25
- AP: No. 25
- Record: 6–1 (5–0 MAC)
- Head coach: Lance Leipold (6th season)
- Offensive coordinator: Andy Kotelnicki (6th season)
- Co-offensive coordinator: Jim Zebrowski (4th season)
- Offensive scheme: Multiple pro-style
- Defensive coordinator: Brian Borland (6th season)
- Co-defensive coordinator: Chris Simpson (1st season)
- Base defense: 4–3
- Captains: Kayode Awosika; Jake Molinich; James Patterson; Jaret Patterson; Taylor Riggins
- Home stadium: University at Buffalo Stadium

Uniform
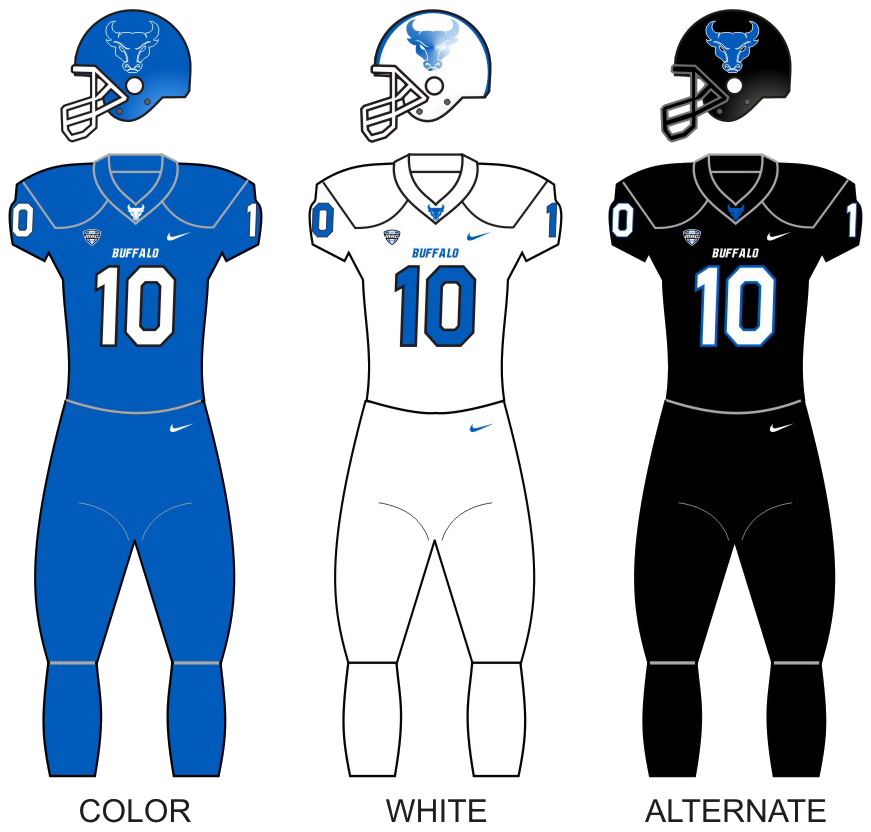

2020 Mid-American Conference football standings
	Conf.			Overall
Team	W		L	W		L
East Division
No. 25 Buffalo xy	5	–	0	6	–	1
Kent State	3	–	1	3	–	1
Ohio	2	–	1	2	–	1
Miami (OH)	2	–	1	2	–	1
Akron	1	–	5	1	–	5
Bowling Green	0	–	5	0	–	5
West Division
No. 23 Ball State xy$	5	–	1	7	–	1
Western Michigan	4	–	2	4	–	2
Toledo	4	–	2	4	–	2
Central Michigan	3	–	3	3	–	3
Eastern Michigan	2	–	4	2	–	4
Northern Illinois	0	–	6	0	–	6
Championship: Ball State 38, Buffalo 28
$ – Conference champion; x – Division champion/co-champions; y – Championship game participant; Note: Due to COVID-19, the Mid-American suspended the season on August 8, but later decided to begin play on November 4.; Rankings from AP Poll.

The 2020 Buffalo Bulls football team represented the University at Buffalo as a member of the Mid-American Conference (MAC) during the 2020 NCAA Division I FBS football season. Led by Lance Leipold in his sixth and final year as head coach in a limited season, which was initially canceled due to the COVID-19 pandemic before being reinstated, the Bulls compiled an overall record of 6–1 with a mark of 5–0 in conference play, winning the MAC's East Division title. Buffalo advanced to the MAC Championship Game, where the Bulls lost to Ball State. They concluded the season with a win over Marshall in the Camellia Bowl. The team played home games at University at Buffalo Stadium in Amherst, New York.

Following the season, on April 30, 2021, Leipold left the team become the head football coach at the University of Kansas. A few days later, the school named Michigan co-defensive coordinator Maurice Linguist the team's new head coach.

== Schedule ==
Buffalo originally had a game scheduled against Ohio State, but it was canceled due to the COVID-19 pandemic. Buffalo played a regular season consisting of games against only MAC teams.

Date	Time	Opponent	Site	TV	Result	Attendance	Source
November 4	7:00 p.m.	at Northern Illinois	Huskie Stadium; DeKalb, IL	ESPN2	W 49–30	449	
November 10	8:00 p.m.	Miami (OH)	University at Buffalo Stadium; Amherst, NY	ESPN	W 42–10	0	
November 17	7:00 p.m.	at Bowling Green	Doyt Perry Stadium; Bowling Green, OH	CBSSN	W 42–17	1,500	
November 28	12:00 p.m.	Kent State	University at Buffalo Stadium; Amherst, NY	CBSSN	W 70–41	0	
December 5	3:30 p.m.	at Ohio	Peden Stadium; Athens, OH	CBSSN	Cancelled		
December 12	2:30 p.m.	Akron	University at Buffalo Stadium; Amherst, NY	CBSSN	W 56–7	0	
December 18	7:30 p.m.	vs. Ball State	Ford Field; Detroit, MI (MAC Championship Game)	ESPN	L 28–38	0	
December 25	2:30 p.m.	vs. Marshall*	Cramton Bowl; Montgomery, AL (Camellia Bowl)	ESPN	W 17–10	2,512	
*Non-conference game; All times are in Eastern time

== Rankings ==
In week 11, Buffalo received votes in the AP Poll for the first time since the 2018 season. They were nationally ranked for the first time in program history when the week 14 poll was released, ranked at No. 24 in the AP Poll. The following week they were raised to No. 23.

Ranking movements Legend: ██ Increase in ranking ██ Decrease in ranking — = Not ranked RV = Received votes
	Week																	
Poll	Pre	1	2	3	4	5	6	7	8	9	10	11	12	13	14	15	16	Final
AP	—	—	—	—	—	—	—	—	—	—	—	RV	RV	RV	24	23	RV	25
Coaches	—	—	—	—	—	—	—	—	—	—	—	—	—	RV	RV	RV	RV	25
CFP	Not released												—	—	—	—	—	Not released

== Preseason ==
=== Award watch lists ===
Listed in the order that they were released

Award	Player	Position	Year
Chuck Bednarik Award	Taylor Riggins	DE	SR
Doak Walker Award	Kevin Marks Jr.	RB	JR
Doak Walker Award	Jaret Patterson	RB	JR
Jim Thorpe Award	Tyrone Hill	S	SR
Bronko Nagurski Trophy	Malcolm Koonce	DE	SR
Bronko Nagurski Trophy	Taylor Riggins	DE	SR
Outland Trophy	Kayode Awosika	OL	SR
Wuerffel Trophy	Max Michel	DE	SO
Maxwell Award	Jaret Patterson	RB	JR

== Season summary ==
The Bulls played their first game of 2020 against Northern Illinois in Dekalb, Illinois, on November 4 after a delayed start to the season due to the COVID-19 pandemic. Jaret Patterson ran for 137 yards including for two touchdowns. Quarterback Kyle Vantrease recorded his first two touchdowns of the season with a rushing touchdown and a passing touchdown to Antonio Nunn. The Buffalo defense scored 3 touchdowns on their own with 2 fumble recoveries returned for touchdowns by Tim Terry Jr. and Isaiah King and an interception returned for a touchdown by Kadofi Wright en route to the Bulls 49–30 win.

The Bulls home opener at UB Stadium occurred six days later against the Miami Redhawks. Kevin Marks Jr. ran for 109 yards compared to Jaret Patterson's 73, but with Patterson rushing for 2 touchdowns. Kyle Vantrease completed 4 touchdown passes as Buffalo defeated Miami 42–10. Buffalo received 1 vote in week 12's AP Poll, their first vote received in the poll of the season.

A week later Buffalo went back on the road traveling to Doyt L. Perry Stadium in Bowling Green, Ohio, to take on the Bowling Green Falcons. Jaret Patterson erupted for 301 yards while scoring 4 touchdowns on 31 carries with fellow Buffalo running back Kevin Marks Jr. and quarterback Kyle Vantrease also recording a rushing touchdown each in Buffalo's 42–17 win in Bowling Green. Buffalo received 3 votes in week 13's AP Poll.

The Bulls played their first Saturday game of the season on November 28 against Kent State at UB Stadium. Jaret Patterson rushed for over 400 yards, coming within striking distance of breaking the FBS record for most yards rushed for in a game. He scored 8 touchdowns which tied the record for most FBS touchdowns by one player in a single game. Patterson's massive performance was done on only 36 carries throughout the game, with teammate Kevin Marks Jr. also getting 16 carries and recording 2 rushing touchdowns on his own. Patterson's impressive performance against Kent State earned him national attention and calls for him to be added to the watchlist for the Heisman Trophy. Buffalo defeated Kent State 70–41 and received 56 votes in week 14's AP Poll, coming within striking distance of a national ranking.

The following week, Buffalo was slated to play the Ohio Bobcats, but because of a COVID-19 outbreak on the Ohio football team, the game was canceled. Nevertheless, Buffalo increased their share of the vote in the AP Poll to 145, good for a No. 24 ranking in the poll. This was the first national ranking in Buffalo football program history.

Buffalo finished off their regular season on December 12 against Akron at UB Stadium. Jaret Patterson was sparsely used against Akron, receiving the entire second half of the game off. Patterson and Marks Jr. each recorded 2 rushing touchdowns each as Buffalo defeated Akron 56–7 and finished the regular season undefeated at 5–0. The Bulls once again increased their share of the vote in the AP Poll up to 186, good to jump up a position in the poll to No. 23.

== Roster ==
2020 Buffalo Bulls football team roster
Players
Coaches
Offense

Pos.	#	Name	Class
WR	1	Antonio Nunn	Sr
RB	2	Ron Cook Jr.	So
WR	3	Daniel Lee	Sr
QB	4	Trevor Bycznski	Fr
RB	5	Kevin Marks	Jr
QB	6	Casey Case	Fr
QB	7	Kyle Vantrease	Jr
RB	8	Dylan McDuffie	So
QB	9	Dominic Johnson	Sr
QB	10	Matt Myers	So
QB	12	Aaron Chase	Fr
WR	13	Carlton Todd	Sr
WR	17	Bernard Porter	So
WR	18	Trevor Wilson	Fr
WR	19	Javien Cuff	Fr
RB	21	Kolbe Burrell	Fr
RB	25	Tajay Ahmed	So
RB	26	Jaret Patterson	Jr
RB	28	Caron Robinson	Fr
RB	30	Ryan Razzano	Fr
TE	34	Trevor Borland	Fr
TE	36	Cole Burniston	So
RB	37	Jailen Nias	Fr
TE	44	Jake Molinich	Sr
TE	47	Wyatt Molinich	Fr
OL	58	Alain Schaerer	So
OL	59	Jake Fuzak	Sr
OL	60	Trevor Cahill	So
OL	62	Mike Novitsky	So
OL	63	A. J. Urbaniak	Fr
OL	64	Mike Dempsey	Fr
OL	65	Michael Ford Jr.	Fr
OL	66	Jacob Gall	Jr
OL	68	Donovan Cornelius	Fr
OL	69	Gabe Wallace	So
OL	70	Nick Zikuski	Fr
OL	71	Ray Thomas-Ishman	GS
OL	72	Deondre Doiron	Fr
OL	73	Kayode Awosika	Sr
OL	74	Bence Polgar	Fr
OL	75	Sam Todd	Fr
OL	76	Anthony Laudicina	Fr
OL	77	Caelan Shepard	Fr
OL	78	Tyler Doty	Fr
OL	79	Jack Klenk	Sr
TE	80	Tyler Stephens	Fr
WR	82	Tyree O'Neill	Jr
WR	83	Marlyn Johnson	Fr
WR	84	Jackson Westfall	Fr
WR	86	Tahliq Battle	Fr
WR	87	Jovany Ruiz	Sr
WR	88	Dajuan Hudson	Sr
TE	89	Zac Lefebvre	Sr

Defense

Pos.	#	Name	Class
DT	0	Eddie Wilson	Jr
CB	3	Aapri Washington	Jr
CB	4	Isaiah King	Jr
LB	5	Tim Terry Jr.	Jr
LB	6	Max Michel	So
S	7	E. J. Brown	Sr
S	10	Marcus Fuqua	Fr
CB	11	Wankeith Akin Jr.	Jr
LB	12	Lonnie Rice	Fr
LB	13	Sean Colgan	Sr
CB	15	Ali Abbas	Sr
CB	17	Jahkeel Reef	Fr
LB	18	Roy Baker	Sr
CB	19	Shemar Hayes	Jr
LB	20	James Patterson	Jr
CB	22	Mark Davis	Fr
LB	23	Keith Woetzel	GS
S	24	Corey Gross Jr.	So
LB	25	Caleb Tate	Fr
LB	27	Tyree Thompson	GS
S	28	Jalen McNair	Fr
CB	29	Larry Robbins	Fr
LB	30	Rich Miller	So
LB	31	Kadofi Wright	Sr
S	32	Owen Chambers	So
S	33	Tyrone Hill	Sr
LB	35	Logic Hudgens	Fr
DE	36	Nick Hunter	Jr
DE	38	Bryce Johnson-Maith	Fr
CB	39	Dylan Powell	Jr
LB	42	Brendan Pyne	GS
LB	43	Jason McCarthy	Fr
S	45	Evan Gantley	Jr
LB	47	Caleb Arena	Fr
DE	49	Taylor Riggins	Sr
DE	50	Malcolm Koonce	Sr
DE	51	Zander Heim	Jr
LB	52	Shaun Dolac	Fr
DE	53	C. J. Bazile	Fr
DE	55	Kyler Laing	Fr
LB	56	Jake Zimmer	So
DL	61	Dom Polizzi	Fr
DT	90	George Wolo	Fr
DE	91	Mason Hoose	Jr
DT	93	Michael Tetteh	Fr
DE	94	Eric Black	Jr
DT	95	Tyrece Woods Jr.	So
DE	96	Jordan Avissey	Fr
DT	99	Ronald McGee	Jr
DE	99	Frendy Darelus	Jr

Special teams

Pos.	#	Name	Class
K, P	14	Jackson Baltar	So
K	16	Alex McNulty	So
LS	37	Evan Davis	So
P	40	Evan Finegan	Jr
LS	57	Jeremiah Riordan	Sr
P	85	James Hook	Fr
K	95	Garrett Selover	Fr

Head coach

- Lance Leipold

Coordinators/assistant coaches

- Rob Ianello (Associate head coach / recruiting coordinator / wide receivers)
- Brian Borland (defensive coordinator / cornerbacks)
- Andy Kotelnicki (offensive coordinator / running backs)
- Scott Fuchs (offensive line)
- Alan Hensell (tight ends)
- Chris Simpson (Linebackers / defensive run game coordinator)
- Brad McCaslin (defensive tackles)
- Jim Zebrowski (Quarterbacks / Co-offensive coordinator / passing game coordinator)
- Taiwo Onatolu (defensive ends / special teams coordinator)
- Jeff Burrow (safeties)
- Matt Gildersleeve (head strength and conditioning coach)
- Ryan Wilson (graduate assistant)
- Daniel Allen (graduate assistant)
- James Daniels (graduate assistant)
- Isaac Reed (graduate assistant)

Legend

- (C) Team captain
- (S) Suspended
- (I) Ineligible
- Injured
- Redshirt

Roster
Last update: April 24, 2019

== After the season ==
=== NFL draft ===
The following Bull was selected in the 2021 NFL draft following the season.

Round	Pick	Player	Position	NFL club
3	79	Malcolm Koonce	Defensive end	Las Vegas Raiders
