= Tommy Doyle (American football) =

American football player (born 1998)

No. 72
- Position: Offensive tackle

Personal information
- Born: May 6, 1998 (age 28); Edina, Minnesota, U.S.
- Listed height: 6 ft 8 in (2.03 m)
- Listed weight: 320 lb (145 kg)

Career information
- High school: Edina
- College: Miami (OH) (2016–2020)
- NFL draft: 2021: 5th round, 161st overall pick

Career history
- Buffalo Bills (2021–2024)

Awards and highlights
- 2× First-team All-MAC (2019, 2020)

Career NFL statistics
- Games played: 12
- Stats at Pro Football Reference

Thomas Adam Doyle (born May 6, 1998) is an American former professional football player who was an offensive tackle for four seasons in the National Football League (NFL), all for the Buffalo Bills. He played college football for the Miami RedHawks and was selected by the Bills in the fifth round of the 2021 NFL draft.

== College career ==
Doyle was ranked as a three–star recruit by 247Sports.com coming out of high school. He committed to Miami (OH) on June 17, 2015.

== Professional career ==
Pre-draft measurables
| Height | Weight | Arm length | Hand span | 40-yard dash | 10-yard split | 20-yard split | 20-yard shuttle | Three-cone drill | Vertical jump | Broad jump | Bench press |
|---|---|---|---|---|---|---|---|---|---|---|---|
| 6 ft 8 in (2.03 m) | 320 lb (145 kg) | 35 1/8 in (0.89 m) | 10 3/8 in (0.26 m) | 5.11 s | 1.76 s | 2.94 s | 4.57 s | 7.42 s | 33.5 in (0.85 m) | 9 ft 3 in (2.82 m) | 24 reps |
All values from Pro Day

Doyle was selected by the Buffalo Bills in the fifth round (161st overall) of the 2021 NFL draft. The Bills previously acquired the pick in a trade with the Las Vegas Raiders that sent Zay Jones to the Raiders. On May 13, 2021, Doyle signed his four-year rookie contract with Buffalo. On January 15, 2022, Doyle scored his first NFL touchdown, catching a one-yard pass from Josh Allen in the Bills' 47–17 win over the New England Patriots in the Wild Card round of the 2021–22 NFL playoffs.

On September 27, 2022, Doyle was placed on season-ending injured reserve after suffering a torn ACL against the Miami Dolphins in Week 3.

On August 21, 2023, Doyle was placed on injured reserve after suffering a knee injury in the preseason. It was also revealed that his left leg was diagnosed with nerve damage.

On June 4, 2024, the Bills placed Doyle on the reserve/PUP list. He did not play for the entire 2024 season.

On February 14, 2025, Doyle announced his retirement from professional football due to medical reasons. He had not appeared in a regular season game since Week 3 of the 2022 season. However, Doyle was eligible for an NFL pension, since seasons on Injured Reserve or the PUP list counted towards the three seasons required to be eligible.
