= 2020 Ohio Bobcats football team =

American college football season

2020 Ohio Bobcats football
- Conference: Mid-American Conference
- East Division
- Record: 2–1 (2–1 MAC)
- Head coach: Frank Solich (16th season)
- Offensive coordinator: Tim Albin (16th season)
- Offensive scheme: Spread option
- Co-defensive coordinators: Ron Collins (4th season); Pete Germano (2nd season)
- Base defense: 4-3
- Captains: Kai Caesar; Austin Conrad; Brett Kitrell; Cameron Odem; Jared Dorsa; Julian Ross; Kurtis Rourke
- Home stadium: Peden Stadium

Uniform
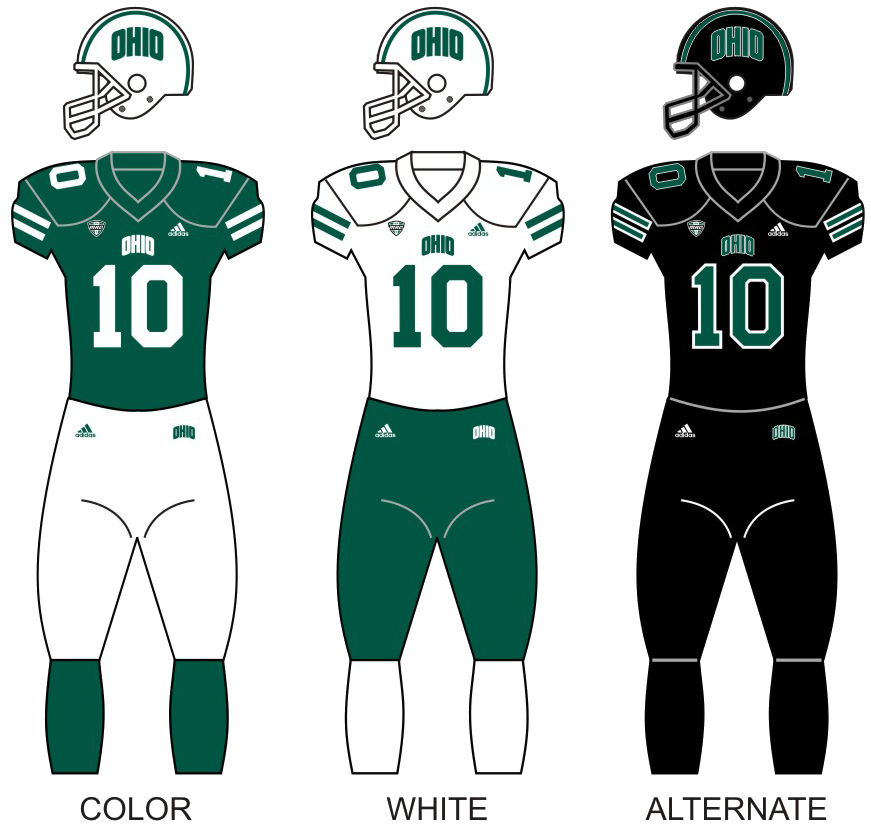

2020 Mid-American Conference football standings
	Conf.			Overall
Team	W		L	W		L
East Division
No. 25 Buffalo xy	5	–	0	6	–	1
Kent State	3	–	1	3	–	1
Ohio	2	–	1	2	–	1
Miami (OH)	2	–	1	2	–	1
Akron	1	–	5	1	–	5
Bowling Green	0	–	5	0	–	5
West Division
No. 23 Ball State xy$	5	–	1	7	–	1
Western Michigan	4	–	2	4	–	2
Toledo	4	–	2	4	–	2
Central Michigan	3	–	3	3	–	3
Eastern Michigan	2	–	4	2	–	4
Northern Illinois	0	–	6	0	–	6
Championship: Ball State 38, Buffalo 28
$ – Conference champion; x – Division champion/co-champions; y – Championship game participant; Note: Due to COVID-19, the Mid-American suspended the season on August 8, but later decided to begin play on November 4.; Rankings from AP Poll.

The 2020 Ohio Bobcats football team represented Ohio University in the 2020 NCAA Division I FBS football season. They were led by 16th-year head coach Frank Solich and played their home games at Peden Stadium in Athens, Ohio, as members of the East Division of the Mid-American Conference. This was Solich's final year as the head coach at Ohio. Ohio didn't play in a bowl for the first time since 2014 as the MAC only allowed its division winners to play but they were bowl eligible for the 12th straight year.

== Schedule ==
Ohio had a game scheduled against North Carolina Central canceled due to the COVID-19 pandemic as most of the FCS season was played in the spring. The MAC was among the last FBS conferences to start football in the fall due to the pandemic with the intention of playing just 6 conference games thus the scheduled rivalry game with Marshall and two other scheduled FBS non-conference games were also not played. Ohio then had conference games with Miami, Buffalo, and Kent State cancelled due to positive COVID-19 tests and ended the season having only played three games.

Date	Time	Opponent	Site	TV	Result	Attendance
November 4	7:00 p.m.	at Central Michigan	Kelly/Shorts Stadium; Mount Pleasant, MI	ESPN	L 27–30	757
November 10	7:00 p.m.	Akron	Peden Stadium; Athens, OH	CBSSN	W 24–10	1,182
November 28	12:00 p.m.	Bowling Green	Peden Stadium; Athens, OH	ESPN+	W 52–10	1,182
Rankings from AP Poll released prior to the game; All times are in Eastern time
