= Jaret Patterson =

American football player (born 1998)

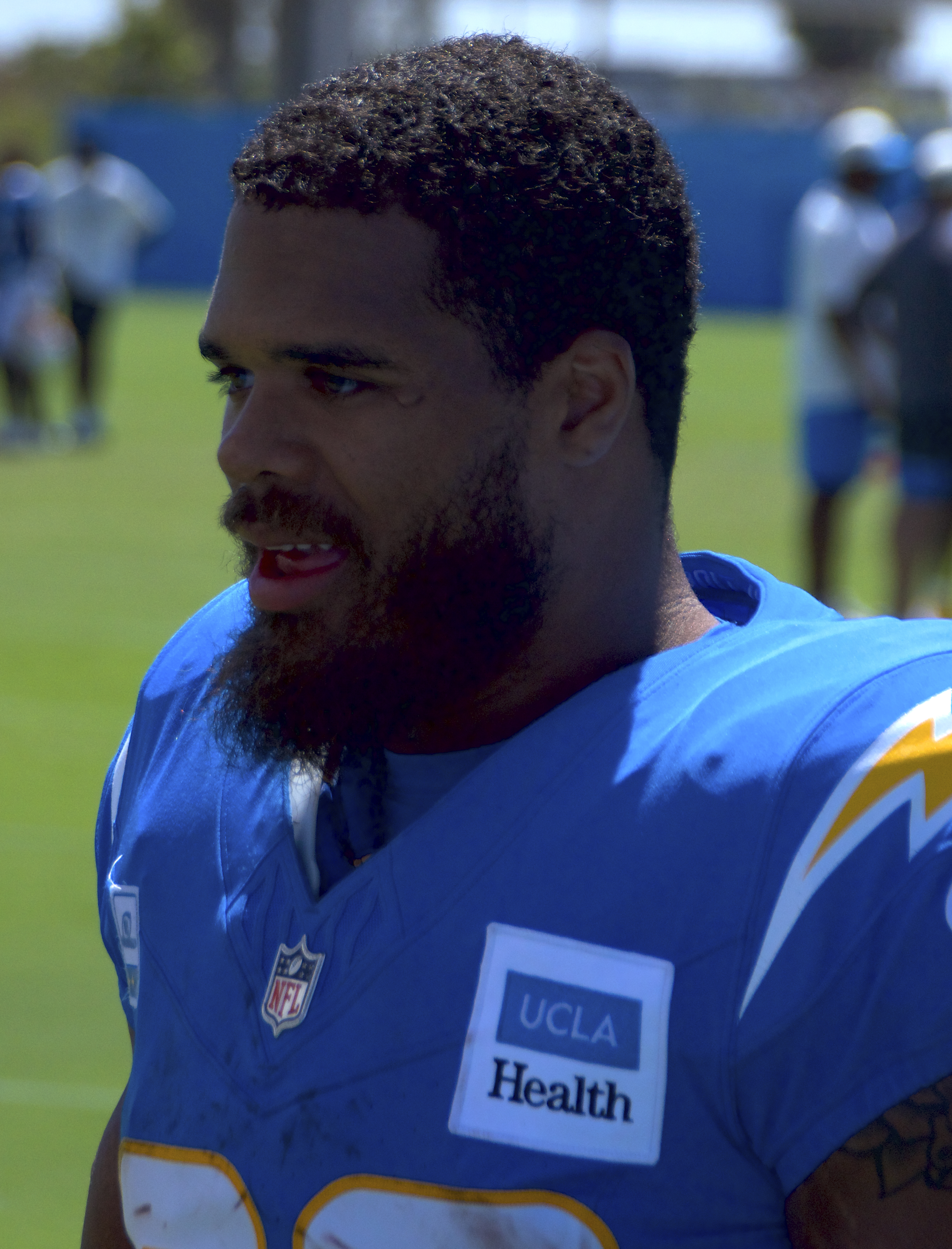
- Patterson with the Los Angeles Chargers in 2026

No. 41 – Denver Broncos
- Position: Running back
- Roster status: Practice squad

Personal information
- Born: December 23, 1998 (age 27); Glenn Dale, Maryland, U.S.
- Listed height: 5 ft 8 in (1.73 m)
- Listed weight: 195 lb (88 kg)

Career information
- High school: St. Vincent Pallotti (Laurel, Maryland)
- College: Buffalo (2018–2020)
- NFL draft: 2021: undrafted

Career history
- Washington Football Team / Commanders (2021–2022); Los Angeles Chargers (2023)*; Washington Commanders (2023)*; Los Angeles Chargers (2024–2025); Minnesota Vikings (2026)*; Cleveland Browns (2026)*; Denver Broncos (2026–present)*
- * Offseason or practice squad member only

Awards and highlights
- MAC Most Valuable Player (2020); MAC Offensive Player of the Year (2020); MAC Freshman of the Year (2018); 2× First-team All-MAC (2019, 2020); Second-team All-MAC (2018); NCAA records: Most touchdowns in an NCAA football game: 8 (tie); Most points in an NCAA football game: 48 (tie)

Career NFL statistics as of 2025
- Rushing yards: 503
- Rushing average: 4.0
- Rushing touchdowns: 3
- Receptions: 13
- Receiving yards: 81
- Stats at Pro Football Reference

Jaret Patterson (born December 23, 1998) is an American professional football running back for the Denver Broncos of the National Football League (NFL). He played college football for the Buffalo Bulls before signing with the Washington Commanders, then known as the Washington Football Team, as an undrafted free agent in 2021. Alongside Howard Griffith, Patterson holds the NCAA Division I Football Bowl Subdivision record for most rushing touchdowns in a single game with eight.

== Early life ==
Patterson attended St. Vincent Pallotti High School in Laurel, Maryland, where he played football with future NFL Defensive Rookie of the Year and Washington Commanders teammate Chase Young. Patterson rushed for 2,045 yards and 23 touchdowns in his senior season. In a game against Riverdale Baptist he accounted for 558 all-purpose yards. Patterson was named an All-State Honorable Mention. He committed to the University at Buffalo to play college football in the Mid-American Conference. Patterson was not as heavily recruited out of high school compared to his twin brother James and the two were recruited to Buffalo as a package deal.

College recruiting
Name	Hometown	School	Height	Weight	Commit date
Jaret Patterson; RB	Laurel, Maryland	St. Vincent Pallotti	5 ft 8 in (1.73 m)	175 lb (79 kg)	Feb 1, 2017
Jaret Patterson; RB	Recruit ratings: Rivals: 247Sports: ESPN: (N/A)				
Overall recruit ranking: Rivals: N/A 247Sports: 3158 ESPN: N/A
Note: In many cases, Scout, Rivals, 247Sports, On3, and ESPN may conflict in their listings of height and weight.; In these cases, the average was taken. ESPN grades are on a 100-point scale.; Sources: "Jaret Patterson, 2017". Rivals.; "2014 Team Ranking". Rivals.com.

== College career ==
Patterson and his brother grayshirted in the fall of 2017 and joined the team full-time for spring practice in 2018. In his freshman season in 2018, Patterson rushed for 1,013 yards and 14 touchdowns. He was named the Mid-American Conference Freshman of the Year and named to the All-MAC Second-team. He returned as Buffalo's starting running back in 2019 and had the best season by a running back in school history by rushing for a single-season school record 1,799 yards and scoring 19 rushing touchdowns, also a school record. He led the MAC and ranked fifth in the nation in rushing yards on his way to being named to the All-MAC First-team. In the 2019 Bahamas Bowl, Patterson rushed for 173 yards and two touchdowns in a Buffalo win, their first bowl win in program history, and received the game's offensive MVP award.

On November 28, 2020, Patterson tied Howard Griffith's FBS single-game record with eight rushing touchdowns against the Kent State Golden Flashes in a 70–41 win. Patterson finished the game with 36 carries for 409 yards, 18 yards short of the single-game FBS record set by former Oklahoma Sooners running back Samaje Perine in 2014. Patterson was forced to sit out Buffalo's appearance in the 2020 Camellia Bowl, due to knee issues. Following the season, Patterson was named the conference's Offensive Player of the Year and was given the Vern Smith Leadership Award as the conference's most valuable player. Patterson declared for the 2021 NFL draft following his junior year.

=== Records ===
Buffalo Bulls

- Most rushing yards in a single game (409)
- Most rushing yards in a single season (1,799)
- Most rushing touchdowns in a single season (19)

NCAA

- Tied for most touchdowns in a single game (8)
- Tied for most points in a single game (48)

=== College statistics ===
Year		Rushing					Receiving				
Year	G	Att	Yds	Avg	Lng	TD	Rec	Yds	Avg	Lng	TD
2018	14	183	1,013	5.5	64	14	7	62	8.9	23	0
2019	13	312	1,799	5.8	82	19	13	209	16.1	61	1
2020	6	141	1,072	7.6	67	19	0	0	0.0	0	0
Career	33	636	3,884	6.1	82	52	20	271	13.6	61	1

== Professional career ==
Pre-draft measurables
Height	Weight	Arm length	Hand span	Wingspan	40-yard dash	10-yard split	20-yard split	20-yard shuttle	Three-cone drill	Vertical jump	Broad jump	Bench press
5 ft 6 1/2 in (1.69 m)	195 lb (88 kg)	28 3/4 in (0.73 m)	9 1/4 in (0.23 m)	5 ft 8 3/4 in (1.75 m)	4.59 s	1.58 s	2.45 s	4.35 s	7.03 s	30.0 in (0.76 m)	9 ft 9 in (2.97 m)	19 reps
All values from Pro Day

=== Washington Football Team / Commanders (first stint) ===
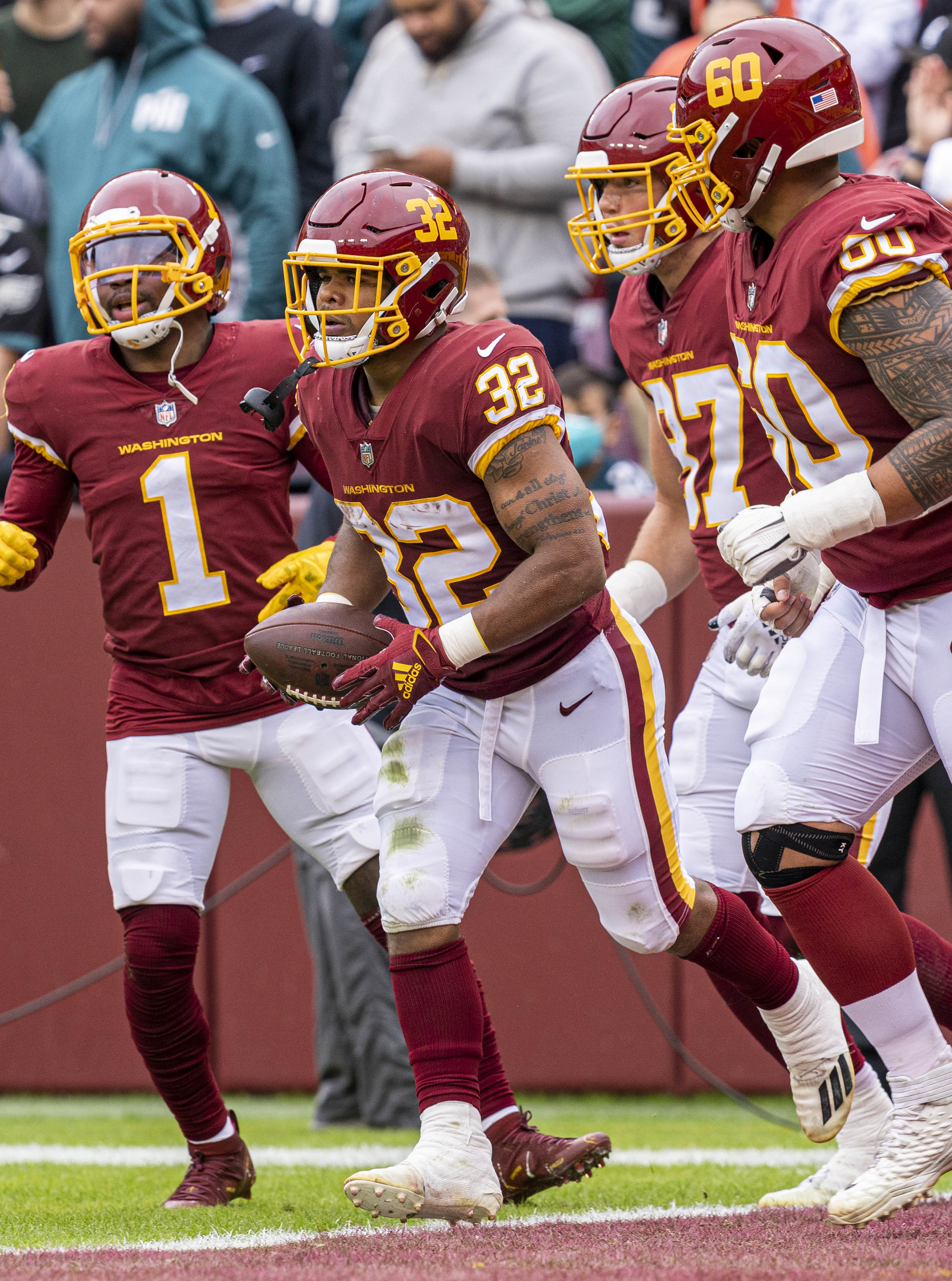
Patterson after scoring a touchdown in 2022

Patterson signed with the Washington Football Team on May 3, 2021, after going unselected in the 2021 NFL draft. Patterson performed well enough in the 2021 preseason to receive praise from head coach Ron Rivera. He was ultimately named to the team's final roster over veteran running back Peyton Barber.

Prior to the first game of the regular season, Patterson was listed as the third running back on the depth chart behind Antonio Gibson and J. D. McKissic. He made his pro football debut in the first week of the season with two rushes for nine yards on four offensive snaps. After playing only on special teams in the following two games, he recorded his first reception in the fourth week of the season on the first target of his career. It was good for eleven yards and a first down. In the eighth week of the season, he recorded season-highs with eleven rushing attempts and 46 rushing yards. In the Week 15 game against the Philadelphia Eagles, Patterson fumbled for the first time in his NFL career but also scored his first career touchdown on a fourth-quarter carry from the one-yard line. Patterson would get his first career start in Week 17 against the Eagles in place of Antonio Gibson, who was on the team's COVID-19 reserve list. In the game, he recorded 57 rushing yards on 12 carries, his second career touchdown, and 41 receiving yards on five receptions.

On August 30, 2022, Patterson was waived by the Commanders and signed to the practice squad the next day. He spent the entire 2022 season on the practice squad until November 14 when he was activated for that night's game following injuries to Gibson and McKissic. The majority of the carries went to Brian Robinson Jr., however, and Patterson only appeared on four plays on special teams. Patterson appeared in a game on January 1 and returned kicks for the first time in his NFL career, picking up 70 yards on three opportunities. He was signed to the active roster again on January 5, 2023. Patterson got his first touches on offense in the final game of the season in a winning effort. Although on the bench behind Jonathan Williams, he led the team with 17 carries and 78 rushing yards, both of which set career highs.

On August 28, 2023, Patterson was released as part of final roster cuts before the start of 2023 season.

=== Los Angeles Chargers ===
On September 13, 2023, the Los Angeles Chargers signed Patterson to their practice squad. He was released on December 20.

=== Washington Commanders (second stint) ===
On December 26, 2023, Patterson signed with the practice squad of the Washington Commanders. He became a free agent when his practice squad contract expired after the season.

=== Los Angeles Chargers (second stint) ===
On January 10, 2024, Patterson signed a reserve/future contract with the Los Angeles Chargers. He was waived on August 29 and re-signed to the practice squad. He was elevated to the active roster on December 7, and appeared in one special teams play for the Chargers the following day against the Kansas City Chiefs. It would be his only appearance that season.

Patterson signed a reserve/future contract with Los Angeles on January 13, 2025. On August 26, Patterson was released with an injury settlement by the Chargers as part of final roster cuts before the start of the 2025 season. On October 14, Patterson was re-signed to the practice squad. He was promoted to the active roster on November 29. Patterson was waived by the Chargers following Omarion Hampton's return from injury on December 8. He was re-signed to the team's practice squad two days later. Patterson was promoted back to the active roster on December 23.

On August 30, 2026, the Chargers released Patterson as a part of final roster cuts before the start of the regular season.

=== Minnesota Vikings ===
On September 22, 2026, Patterson was signed to the Minnesota Vikings' practice squad. On September 29, he was released from the Vikings practice squad.

=== Cleveland Browns ===
On October 7, 2026, Patterson signed with the Cleveland Browns practice squad. On October 27, Patterson was released.

=== Denver Broncos ===
On November 3, 2026, Patterson signed with the Denver Broncos practice squad.
