= D'Wayne Eskridge =

American football player (born 1997)

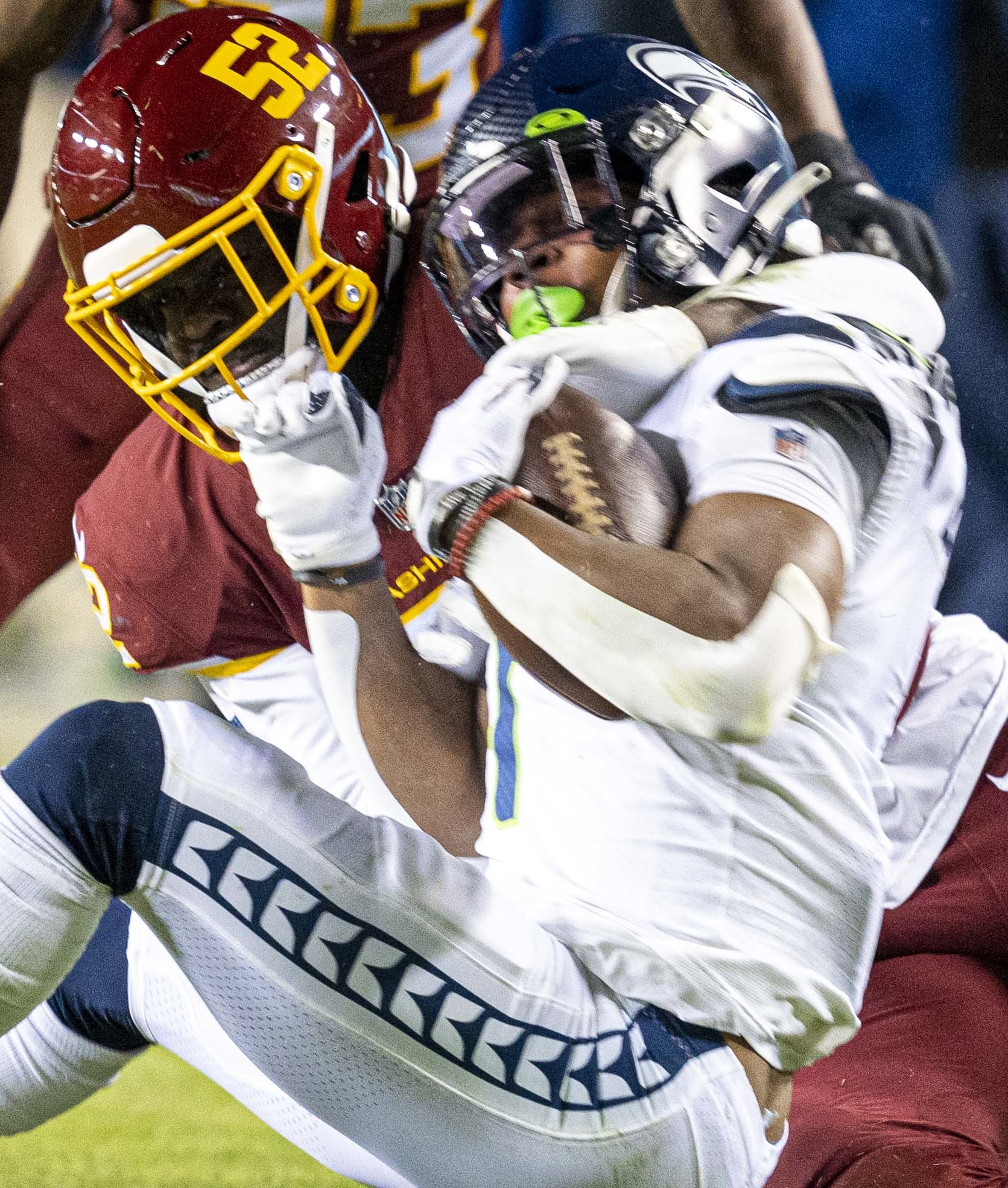
- Eskridge with the Seattle Seahawks in 2021

No. 25 – Minnesota Vikings
- Position: Wide receiver
- Roster status: Practice squad

Personal information
- Born: March 23, 1997 (age 29); Winona, Mississippi, U.S.
- Listed height: 5 ft 9 in (1.75 m)
- Listed weight: 190 lb (86 kg)

Career information
- High school: Bluffton (Bluffton, Indiana)
- College: Western Michigan (2016–2020)
- NFL draft: 2021: 2nd round, 56th overall pick

Career history
- Seattle Seahawks (2021–2023); Miami Dolphins (2024–2025); Minnesota Vikings (2026–present)*
- * Offseason or practice squad member only

Awards and highlights
- Second-team All-American (2020); MAC Special Teams Player of the Year (2020); First-team All-MAC (2020)

Career NFL statistics as of 2025
- Receptions: 24
- Receiving yards: 228
- Receiving touchdowns: 1
- Return yards: 1,300
- Stats at Pro Football Reference

D'Wayne "Dee" Eskridge (born March 23, 1997) is an American professional football wide receiver for the Minnesota Vikings of the National Football League (NFL). He played college football for the Western Michigan Broncos and was selected by the Seattle Seahawks in the second round of the 2021 NFL draft.

== Early life ==
Eskridge was born and initially grew up in Winona, Mississippi, before his family moved to Bluffton, Indiana, while he was in grade school. He attended Bluffton High School, where he played football and was a sprinter on the track team. He was named Indiana's Mr. Track and Field as a senior. He committed to play college football at Western Michigan over Ball State, which was the only other FBS program to offer him a scholarship.

== College career ==
Eskridge saw playing time as a reserve receiver as a freshman. Eskridge became a starter going into his sophomore season and finished the year with 30 receptions for 506 yards and three touchdowns. As a junior, he caught 38 passes for 776 yards and three touchdowns. Eskridge spent the offseason at cornerback and entered his senior year as a starter on both offense and defense. He broke his collarbone four games into the season and used a medical redshirt. As a redshirt senior, Eskridge returned to playing receiver while also taking on the Broncos' kickoff return duties. At the end of the season he was named first-team All-Mid American Conference (MAC) as a receiver after leading the conference with 784 yards and eight touchdowns on 34 receptions and the MAC Special Teams Player of the Year after returning 16 kickoffs for 467 yards and one touchdown. Following the end of the season Eskridge participated in the 2021 Senior Bowl.

== Professional career ==
Pre-draft measurables
Height	Weight	Arm length	Hand span	40-yard dash	10-yard split	20-yard split	20-yard shuttle	Three-cone drill	Vertical jump	Broad jump
5 ft 8 3/4 in (1.75 m)	190 lb (86 kg)	30 1/2 in (0.77 m)	8 5/8 in (0.22 m)	4.39 s	1.51 s	2.66 s	4.27 s	6.95 s	35.0 in (0.89 m)	10 ft 4 in (3.15 m)
All values from Pro Day

=== Seattle Seahawks ===
Eskridge was selected by the Seattle Seahawks in the second round (56th overall) of the 2021 NFL draft. On May 14, 2021, Eskridge signed his four-year rookie contract with Seattle, which was for $5.9 million in total in addition to a signing bonus of $1.6 million.

On October 7, 2021, Eskridge was placed on injured reserve with a concussion. He was activated on November 12. On December 5, Eskridge scored his first NFL touchdown on a 7-yard pass from Russell Wilson in a 30–23 victory over the San Francisco 49ers. As a rookie, he recorded ten receptions for 64 yards and one touchdown in ten games.

On November 26, 2022, Eskridge was placed on injured reserve with a broken hand. He appeared in ten games in the 2022 season. He had seven receptions for 58 yards.

Eskridge was suspended the first six games of the 2023 season for violating the NFL's personal conduct policy. The league penalty followed an inquiry into a February 2023 arrest on misdemeanor charges after a confrontation with the mother of his child. He appeared in four games in the 2023 season.

Eskridge was waived by the Seahawks on August 27, 2024.

=== Miami Dolphins ===
On August 29, 2024, Eskridge was signed to the Miami Dolphins' practice squad. He was promoted to the active roster on October 25.

On May 12, 2025, Eskridge re-signed with the Dolphins. In 13 appearances for Miami, he recorded four receptions for 62 scoreless yards. On December 27, Eskridge was placed on season-ending injured reserve due to a toe injury suffered in Week 16 against the Cincinnati Bengals.

=== Minnesota Vikings ===
On November 18, 2026, Eskridge signed to the Minnesota Vikings practice squad.
