= Embassy of the United States, Podgorica =

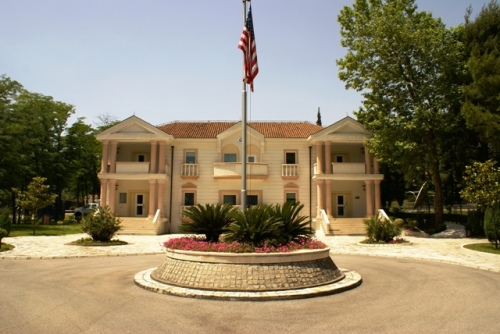
- Location: Podgorica, Montenegro
- Address: Dzona Dzeksona 2 81000 Podgorica Montenegro
- Coordinates: 42°26′13″N 19°15′4″E
- Website: https://me.usembassy.gov

The Embassy of the United States in Podgorica is the diplomatic mission of the United States of America in Montenegro. The United States has been a supporter of Montenegro's integration into Euro-Atlantic institutions. On June 5, 2017, Montenegro became the thirtieth member of NATO, and accession negotiations with the European Union opened in 2012. Montenegro's contributions to international peacekeeping efforts, including its deployment of troops to Afghanistan, have further solidified the bilateral relationship. U.S. Government assistance continues to focus on aiding Montenegro as it transitions towards a market-based democracy integrated within Euro-Atlantic frameworks.

== History ==
The relationship between the United States and Montenegro began when the U.S. recognized the independence of the Principality of Montenegro at the Congress of Berlin in 1878. Formal diplomatic relations commenced on October 30, 1905, after the U.S. Mission to Greece was assigned the additional responsibility of American representation in Montenegro. After World War I and the incorporation of Montenegro into the Kingdom of Yugoslavia, the United States, following other European powers, withdrew its recognition of Montenegrin independence in 1920.

On June 13, 2006, the U.S. recognized the Republic of Montenegro when it regained independence from the State Union of Serbia and Montenegro. Diplomatic relations were reestablished on August 15, 2006, through an exchange of letters between U.S. President George W. Bush and Montenegrin President Filip Vujanović. The American Embassy in Podgorica was established on October 5, 2006, when the U.S. Consulate was upgraded to embassy status, with Arlene Ferrill serving as Chargé d'Affaires ad interim.

In 2018, a Serbian born man attacked the embassy. He threw an explosive grenade inside the embassy and blew himself up outside the compound. The attack occurred around midnight when the embassy was closed, and nobody was wounded.

== See also ==
- Embassy of Montenegro, Washington, D.C.
- List of ambassadors of the United States to Montenegro
- Montenegro–United States relations
