= 2019 Mid-American Conference football season =

- League: NCAA Division I Football Bowl Subdivision
- Sport: Football
- Duration: August 29, 2019 - January 2020
- Teams: 12

Regular Season
- Season MVP: LeVante Bellamy
- East Division champions: Miami RedHawks
- East Division runners-up: Ohio Bobcats
- West Division champions: Central Michigan
- West Division runners-up: Western Michigan

MAC Championship Game
- Champions: Miami RedHawks
- Runners-up: Central Michigan

Football seasons
- 2018 2020

2019 Mid-American Conference football standings
	Conf.			Overall
Team	W		L	W		L
East Division
Miami (OH) x$	6	–	2	8	–	6
Ohio	5	–	3	7	–	6
Buffalo	5	–	3	8	–	5
Kent State	5	–	3	7	–	6
Bowling Green	2	–	6	3	–	9
Akron	0	–	8	0	–	12
West Division
Central Michigan x	6	–	2	8	–	6
Western Michigan	5	–	3	7	–	6
Ball State	4	–	4	5	–	7
Northern Illinois	4	–	4	5	–	7
Toledo	3	–	5	6	–	6
Eastern Michigan	3	–	5	6	–	7
Championship: Miami 26, Central Michigan 21
$ – Conference champion; x – Division champion/co-champions

The 2019 Mid-American Conference football season was the 74th season for the Mid-American Conference (MAC). and is part of the 2019 NCAA Division I FBS football season. The season will begin on August 29 and will end on November 30. The entire schedule was released on February 20, 2019. The MAC Championship Game will be held on December 7, 2019.

== Preseason ==
=== Preseason Poll ===
The MAC Preseason Poll will be released at the MAC Media Day On July 23, 2019 in Detroit, Michigan.

==== East ====
1. Ohio (24), 144 points
2. Miami 107 points
3. Buffalo 100 points
4. Kent State 62 points
5. Akron 54 points
6. Bowling Green 37 points

==== West ====
1. Toledo (15), 127 points
2. Western Michigan (5), 112 points
3. Northern Illinois (3), 103 points
4. Eastern Michigan 83 points
5. Ball State 43 points
6. Central Michigan (1), 36 points

(first place votes)

==== MAC Championship ====
Ohio received 13 votes as the predicted 2019 MAC Championship Game winner. Toledo (7); Western Michigan (2); Northern Illinois (1) and Central Michigan (1) also received votes.

== Head coaches ==
=== Coaching changes ===
There will be three new head coaches in MAC for the 2019 season.

Mike Jinks was fired and replaced by Scot Loeffler at Bowling Green.

John Bonamego was fired and replaced by Jim McElwain at Central Michigan.

Rod Carey left Northern Illinois for Temple and was replaced by Thomas Hammock.

=== Coaches ===
Team	Head coach	Previous Job	Years at school	Overall record	MAC record	MAC titles
Akron	Tom Arth	Chattanooga	1	49–21 (.700)	0–0 (–)	0
Ball State	Mike Neu	New Orleans Saints (QB coach)	4	10–22 (.313)	4–20 (.167)	0
Bowling Green	Scot Loeffler	Virginia Tech Hokies (QB Coach)	1	0–0 (–)	0–0 (–)	0
Buffalo	Lance Leipold	Wisconsin-Whitewater	5	23–27 (.460)	15–17 (.469)	0
Central Michigan	Jim McElwain	Florida	1	44–28 (.611)	44–28 (.611)	0
Eastern Michigan	Chris Creighton	Drake	6	22–40 (.355)	13–27 (.325)	0
Kent State	Sean Lewis	Syracuse (Co Off. Coordinator)	1	0–0 (–)	0–0 (–)	0
Miami	Chuck Martin	Notre Dame	5	24–40 (.375)	20–20 (.500)	0
Northern Illinois	Thomas Hammock	Baltimore Ravens running backs coach	1	0–0 (–)	0–0 (–)	0
Ohio	Frank Solich	Nebraska	15	106–75 (.586)	66–42 (.611)	0
Toledo	Jason Candle	Toledo (Off. Coordinator)	4	28–13 (.683)	20–6 (.769)	1
Western Michigan	Tim Lester	Purdue (QB coach)	3	13–12 (.520)	9–6 (.600)	0

== Schedule ==
=== Regular season ===
The Regular season will begin on August 29 and will end on November 30

Index to colors and formatting
MAC member won
MAC member lost
MAC teams in **bold**

==== Week One ====
Date	Time	Visiting team	Home team	Site	TV	Result	Attendance	Ref.
August 29	6:00 p.m.	Albany	**Central Michigan**	Kelly/Shorts Stadium • Mount Pleasant, MI	ESPN3	**W** 38–21	12,207	
August 29	6:00 p.m.	Morgan State	**Bowling Green**	Doyt Perry Stadium • Bowling Green, OH	ESPN3	**W** 46–3	17,460	
August 29	6:00 p.m.	Robert Morris	**Buffalo**	UB Stadium • Amherst, NY	ESPN+	**W** 38–10	18,412	
August 29	9:00 p.m.	**Kent State**	Arizona State	Sun Devil Stadium • Tempe, AZ	P12N	**L** 7–30	47,413	
August 31	11:00 a.m.	**Toledo**	Kentucky	Kroger Field • Lexington, KY	SECN	**L** 24–38	54,610	
August 31	11:00 a.m.	**Akron**	Illinois	Memorial Stadium • Champaign, IL	BTN	**L** 3–42	30,654	
August 31	11:00 a.m.	Indiana	**Ball State**	Lucas Oil Stadium • Indianapolis, IN	CBSSN	**L** 24–34	21,437	
August 31	1:00 p.m.	Rhode Island	**Ohio**	Peden Stadium • Athens, OH	ESPN+	**W** 41–20	16,665	
August 31	2:30 p.m.	**Eastern Michigan**	Coastal Carolina	Brooks Stadium • Conway, SC	ESPN+	**W** 30–23	14,237	
August 31	6:00 p.m.	Illinois State	**Northern Illinois**	Huskie Stadium • DeKalb, IL	ESPN+	**W** 24–10	14,568	
August 31	6:00 p.m.	Monmouth	**Western Michigan**	Waldo Stadium • Kalamazoo, MI	ESPN3	**W** 48–13	15,021	
August 31	6:30 p.m.	**Miami (OH)**	No. 20 Iowa	Kinnick Stadium • Iowa City, IA	FS1	**L** 24–38	69,250	
^{#}Rankings from AP Poll released prior to game. All times are in Eastern Time.

==== Week Two ====
Date	Time	Visiting team	Home team	Site	TV	Result	Attendance	Ref.
September 7	12:00 p.m.	**Ohio**	Pittsburgh	Heinz Field • Pittsburgh, PA	ACCN	**L** 10–20	42,168	
September 7	12:00 p.m.	UAB	**Akron**	InfoCision Stadium • Akron, OH	CBSSN	**L** 20–31	18,972	
September 7	12:00 p.m.	**Bowling Green**	Kansas State	Bill Snyder Family Football Stadium • Manhattan, KS	FSN	**L** 0–52	46,075	
September 7	12:00 p.m.	Kennesaw State	**Kent State**	Dix Stadium • Kent, OH	ESPN3	**W** 26–23 ^{OT}	18,679	
September 7	1:00 p.m.	**Northern Illinois**	No. 13 Utah	Rice–Eccles Stadium • Salt Lake City, UT	P12N	**L** 17–35	45,919	
September 7	2:00 p.m.	Fordham	**Ball State**	Scheumann Stadium • Muncie, IN	ESPN3	**W** 57–29	10,123	
September 7	2:30 p.m.	Tennessee Tech	**Miami (OH)**	Yager Stadium • Oxford, OH	ESPN+	**W** 48–17	16,022	
September 7	3:30 p.m.	**Central Michigan**	No. 17 Wisconsin	Camp Randall Stadium • Madison, WI	BTN	**L** 0–61	74,437	
September 7	7:30 p.m.	**Buffalo**	No. 15 Penn State	Beaver Stadium • University Park, PA	FOX	**L** 13–45	104,136	
September 7	7:30 p.m.	**Western Michigan**	No. 19 Michigan State	Spartan Stadium • East Lansing, MI	BTN	**L** 17–51	73,113	
September 7	7:30 p.m.	**Eastern Michigan**	Kentucky	Kroger Field • Lexington, KY	SECN	**L** 17–38	55,240	
^{#}Rankings from AP Poll released prior to game. All times are in Eastern Time.

==== Week Three ====
Date	Time	Visiting team	Home team	Site	TV	Result	Attendance	Ref.
September 14	12:00 p.m.	**Eastern Michigan**	Illinois	Memorial Stadium • Champaign, IL	BTN	**W** 34–31	34,759	
September 14	12:00 p.m.	**Miami (OH)**	Cincinnati	Nippert Stadium • Cincinnati, OH (Victory Bell)	ESPNU	**L** 13–35	35,526	
September 14	2:00 p.m.	Florida Atlantic	**Ball State**	Scheumann Stadium • Muncie, IN	ESPN+	**L** 31–41	14,333	
September 14	3:00 p.m.	**Akron**	**Central Michigan**	Kelly/Shorts Stadium • Mount Pleasant, MI	ESPN+	**CMU** 45–24	18,641	
September 14	5:00 p.m.	Louisiana Tech	**Bowling Green**	Doyt Perry Stadium • Bowling Green, OH	ESPN+	**L** 7–35	18,021	
September 14	6:00 p.m.	**Buffalo**	Liberty	Williams Stadium • Lynchburg, VA	ESPN+	**L** 17–35	14,584	
September 14	6:30 p.m.	**Ohio**	Marshall	Joan C. Edwards Stadium • Huntington, WV	ESPN+	**L** 31–33	27,323	
September 14	7:00 p.m.	**Kent State**	Auburn	Jordan–Hare Stadium • Auburn, AL	ESPN2	**L** 16–55	84,542	
September 14	7:00 p.m.	Georgia State	**Western Michigan**	Waldo Stadium • Kalamazoo, MI	ESPN+	**W** 57–10	22,328	
September 14	7:00 p.m.	Murray State	**Toledo**	Glass Bowl • Toledo, OH	ESPN3	**W** 45–0	25,361	
September 14	8:00 p.m.	**Northern Illinois**	Nebraska	Memorial Stadium • Lincoln, NE	FS1	**L** 8–44	89,593	
^{#}Rankings from AP Poll released prior to game. All times are in Eastern Time.

==== Week Four ====
Date	Time	Visiting team	Home team	Site	TV	Result	Attendance	Ref.
September 21	12:00 p.m.	**Western Michigan**	Syracuse	Carrier Dome • Syracuse, NY	ACCN	**L** 33–52	40,700	
September 21	2:00 p.m.	Louisiana	**Ohio**	Peden Stadium • Athens, OH	ESPN+	**L** 25–45	17,416	
September 21	3:00 p.m.	Troy	**Akron**	InfoCision Stadium • Akron, OH	ESPN+	**L** 7–35	16,954	
September 22	3:00 p.m.	Central Connecticut	**Eastern Michigan**	Rynearson Stadium • Ypsilanti, MI	ESPN3	**W** 34–29	17,286	
September 21	3:30 p.m.	**Miami (OH)**	No. 6 Ohio State	Ohio Stadium • Columbus, OH	BTN	**L** 5–76	102,092	
September 21	3:30 p.m.	**Bowling Green**	**Kent State**	Dix Stadium • Kent, OH (Anniversary Award)	ESPN3	**KSU** 62–20	19,700	
September 21	3:30 p.m.	Temple	**Buffalo**	UB Stadium • Buffalo, NY	ESPNU	**W** 38–22	17,621	
September 21	4:00 p.m.	**Central Michigan**	Miami	Hard Rock Stadium • Miami, FL	ACCN	**L** 12–17	49,997	
September 21	7:00 p.m.	**Ball State**	NC State	Carter–Finley Stadium • Raleigh, NC	ESPNU	**L** 23–34	57,702	
September 21	10:15 p.m.	**Toledo**	Colorado State	Canvas Stadium • Fort Collins, CO	ESPN2	**W** 41–35	24,464	
^{#}Rankings from AP Poll released prior to game. All times are in Eastern Time.

==== Week Five ====
Date	Time	Visiting team	Home team	Site	TV	Result	Attendance	Ref.
September 28	12:00 p.m.	**Buffalo**	**Miami (OH)**	Yager Stadium • Oxford, OH	ESPNU	M-OH 34–20	18-419	
September 28	12:00 p.m.	BYU	**Toledo**	Glass Bowl • Toledo, OH	ESPN+	**W** 28–21	24,889	
September 28	12:00 p.m.	**Central Michigan**	**Western Michigan**	Waldo Stadium • Kalamazoo, MI (Victory Cannon / Michigan MAC Trophy)	CBSSN	WMU 31–15	20,476	
September 28	12:00 p.m.	**Northern Illinois**	Vanderbilt	Vanderbilt Stadium • Nashville, TN	SECN	**L** 18–24	24,519	
September 28	3:30 p.m.	**Akron**	UMass	Warren McGuirk Alumni Stadium • Amherst, MA	Flo Sports	**L** 29–37	7,284	
^{#}Rankings from AP Poll released prior to game. All times are in Eastern Time.

==== Week Six ====
Date	Time	Visiting team	Home team	Site	TV	Result	Attendance	Ref.
October 5	12:00 p.m.	Kent State	No. 8 Wisconsin	Camp Randall Stadium • Madison, WI	ESPNU	**L** 0–48	74,559	
October 5	3:00 p.m.	Eastern Michigan	**Central Michigan**	Kelly/Shorts Stadium • Mount Pleasant, MI (Michigan MAC Trophy/Rivalry)	ESPN+	**CMU** 42–16	15,235	
October 5	3:30 p.m.	Ball State	**Northern Illinois**	Huskie Stadium • DeKalb, IL (Bronze Stalk Trophy)	ESPN3	**BSU** 27–20	10,365	
October 5	3:30 p.m.	Western Michigan	**Toledo**	Glass Bowl • Toledo, OH	ESPN+	**TOL** 31–24	22,141	
October 5	3:30 p.m.	Bowling Green	No. 9 Notre Dame	Notre Dame Stadium • Notre Dame, IN	NBC	**L** 0–52	77,622	
October 5	3:30 p.m.	Ohio	**Buffalo**	UB Stadium • Buffalo, NY	ESPN+	**OU** 21–20 ^{OT}	20,042	
^{#}Rankings from AP Poll released prior to game. All times are in Eastern Time.

==== Week Seven ====
Date	Time	Visiting team	Home team	Site	TV	Result	Attendance	Ref.
October 12	12:00 p.m.	**Miami (OH)**	Western Michigan	Waldo Stadium • Kalamazoo, MI	ESPNU	**WMU** 38–16	21,702	
October 12	12:00 p.m.	**Toledo**	Bowling Green	Doyt Perry Stadium • Bowling Green, OH (Battle of I-75 Trophy)	CBSSN	**BGSU** 20–7	19,199	
October 12	2:00 p.m.	**Ball State**	Eastern Michigan	Rynearson Stadium • Ypsilanti, MI	ESPN+	**BSU** 29–23	17,852	
October 12	3:00 p.m.	New Mexico State	Central Michigan	Kelly/Shorts Stadium • Mount Pleasant, MI	ESPN3	**W** 42–28	15,764	
October 12	3:30 p.m.	**Kent State**	Akron	InfoCision Stadium • Akron, OH (Wagon Wheel)	ESPN3	**KSU** 26–3	22,692	
October 12	3:30 p.m.	**Northern Illinois**	Ohio	Peden Stadium • Athens, OH	ESPN+	**NIU** 39–36	18,019	
^{#}Rankings from AP Poll released prior to game. All times are in Eastern Time.

==== Week Eight ====
Date	Time	Visiting team	Home team	Site	TV	Result	Attendance	Ref.
October 19	12:00 p.m.	Kent State	Ohio	Peden Stadium • Athens, OH	CBSSN	**OU** 45–38	15,009	
October 19	2:00 p.m.	Central Michigan	Bowling Green	Doyt Perry Stadium • Bowling Green, OH	ESPN3	**CMU** 38–20	15,100	
October 19	2:00 p.m.	Toledo	Ball State	Scheumann Stadium • Muncie, IN	ESPN+	**BSU** 52–14	15,113	
October 19	2:30 p.m.	Northern Illinois	Miami (OH)	Yager Stadium • Oxford, OH	ESPN+	**M-OH** 27–24	11,710	
October 19	3:30 p.m.	Buffalo	Akron	InfoCision Stadium • Akron, OH	ESPN3	**UB** 21–0	16,909	
October 19	7:00 p.m.	Western Michigan	Eastern Michigan	Rynearson Stadium • Ypsilanti, MI (Michigan MAC Trophy)	ESPN+	**EMU** 34–27	20,528	
^{#}Rankings from AP Poll released prior to game. All times are in Eastern Time.

==== Week Nine ====
Date	Time	Visiting team	Home team	Site	TV	Result	Attendance	Ref.
October 26	12:00 p.m.	Bowling Green	Western Michigan	Waldo Stadium • Kalamazoo, MI	ESPN3	**WMU** 49–10	16,778	
October 26	2:00 p.m.	Ohio	Ball State	Scheumann Stadium • Muncie, IN	ESPN+	**OU** 34–21	5,572	
October 26	3:30 p.m.	Central Michigan	Buffalo	UB Stadium • Buffalo, NY	ESPN+	**UB** 43–20	14,850	
October 26	3:30 p.m.	Miami (OH)	Kent State	Dix Stadium • Kent, OH	ESPN+	**M-OH** 23–16	8,455	
October 26	3:30 p.m.	Eastern Michigan	Toledo	Glass Bowl • Toledo, OH	ESPN+	**TOL** 37–34 ^{OT}	18,061	
October 26	3:30 p.m.	Akron	Northern Illinois	Huskie Stadium • DeKalb, IL	ESPN3	**NIU** 49–0	9,027	
^{#}Rankings from AP Poll released prior to game. All times are in Eastern Time.

==== Week Ten ====
Date	Time	Visiting team	Home team	Site	TV	Result	Attendance	Ref.
November 2	12:00 p.m.	**Northern Illinois**	**Central Michigan**	Kelly/Shorts Stadium • Mount Pleasant, MI	CBSSN	**CMU** 48–10	10,438	
November 2	12:00 p.m.	**Buffalo**	**Eastern Michigan**	Rynearson Stadium • Ypsilanti, MI	ESPNU	**UB** 43–14	16,017	
November 2	2:00 p.m.	**Akron**	**Bowling Green**	Doyt Perry Stadium • Bowling Green, OH	ESPN+	**BGSU** 35–6	12,113	
^{#}Rankings from AP Poll released prior to game. All times are in Eastern Time.

==== Week Eleven ====
Date	Time	Visiting team	Home team	Site	TV	Result	Attendance	Ref.
November 5	7:00 p.m.	**Kent State**	**Toledo**	Glass Bowl • Toledo, OH	CBSSN	**TOL** 35–33	16,331	
November 5	8:00 p.m.	**Ball State**	**Western Michigan**	Waldo Stadium • Kalamazoo, MI	ESPN2	**WMU** 35–31	11,314	
November 6	8:00 p.m.	**Miami (OH)**	**Ohio**	Peden Stadium • Athens, OH (Battle of the Bricks)	ESPN2	**M-OH** 24–21	20,589	
^{#}Rankings from AP Poll released prior to game. All times are in Eastern Time.

==== Week Twelve ====
Date	Time	Visiting team	Home team	Site	TV	Result	Attendance	Ref.
November 12	7:30 p.m.	Western Michigan	Ohio	Peden Stadium • Athens, OH	ESPN2	**WMU** 37–34 ^{OT}	11,700	
November 12	8:00 p.m.	Eastern Michigan	Akron	InfoCision Stadium • Akron, OH	ESPNU	**EMU** 42–14	10,811	
November 13	8:00 p.m.	Bowling Green	Miami (OH)	Yager Stadium • Oxford, OH	ESPNU	**M-OH** 44–3	19,897	
November 13	8:00 p.m.	Northern Illinois	Toledo	Glass Bowl • Toledo, OH	ESPN2	**NIU** 31–28	15,610	
November 14	7:00 p.m.	Buffalo	Kent State	Dix Stadium • Kent, OH	CBSSN	**KSU** 30–27	8,450	
November 16	3:30 p.m.	Central Michigan	Ball State	Scheumann Stadium • Muncie, IN	CBSSN	**CMU** 45–44	7,249	
^{#}Rankings from AP Poll released prior to game. All times are in Eastern Time.

==== Week Thirteen ====
Date	Time	Visiting team	Home team	Site	TV	Result	Attendance	Ref.
November 19	7:30 p.m.	**Eastern Michigan**	**Northern Illinois**	Huskie Stadium • DeKalb, IL	ESPN2	**EMU** 45–17	5,062	
November 19	7:30 p.m.	**Ohio**	**Bowling Green**	Doyt Perry Stadium • Bowling Green, OH	ESPNU	**OU** 66–24	9,715	
November 20	7:30 p.m.	**Akron**	**Miami (OH)**	Yager Stadium • Oxford, OH	ESPNU	**M-OH** 20–17	22,921	
November 20	7:30 p.m.	**Toledo**	**Buffalo**	UB Stadium • Buffalo, NY	ESPN2	**UB** 49–30	13,830	
November 23	12:00 p.m.	**Ball State**	**Kent State**	Dix Stadium • Kent, OH	ESPN+	**KSU** 41–38	8,825	
^{#}Rankings from AP Poll released prior to game. All times are in Eastern Time.

==== Week Fourteen ====
Date	Time	Visiting team	Home team	Site	TV	Result	Attendance	Ref.
November 26	6:00 p.m.	Ohio	Akron	InfoCision Stadium • Akron, OH	ESPN+	**OU** 52–3	21,414	
November 26	7:00 p.m.	Western Michigan	Northern Illinois	Huskie Stadium • DeKalb, IL	ESPNU	**NIU** 17–14	3,568	
November 29	12:00 p.m.	Bowling Green	Buffalo	UB Stadium • Buffalo, NY	ESPN+	**UB** 49–7	13,749	
November 29	12:00 p.m.	Kent State	Eastern Michigan	Rynearson Stadium • Ypsilanti, MI	ESPN+	**KSU** 34–26	13,444	
November 29	12:00 p.m.	Miami (OH)	Ball State	Scheumann Stadium • Muncie, IN	CBSSN	**BSU** 41–27	7,155	
November 29	12:00 p.m.	Toledo	Central Michigan	Kelly/Shorts Stadium • Mount Pleasant, MI	ESPNU	**CMU** 49–7	9,101	
^{#}Rankings from AP Poll released prior to game. All times are in Eastern Time.

=== Championship Game ===
==== Week Fifteen (MAC Championship game) ====
Date	Time	Visiting team	Home team	Site	TV	Result	Attendance	Ref.
December 7	12:00 p.m.	**Miami (OH)**	**Central Michigan**	Ford Field • Detroit, MI	ESPN	**M-OH** 26–21	22,427	
^{#}Rankings from AP Poll released prior to game. All times are in Eastern Time Zone.

== Mid-American vs other conferences ==
2019–2020 records against non-conference foes:

Regular Season

Power 5 Conferences	Record
ACC	0–4
Big Ten	1–9
Big 12	0–1
BYU/Notre Dame	1–1
Pac-12	0–2
SEC	0–4
Power 5 Total	2–21
Other FBS Conferences	Record
American	1–1
C-USA	1–3
Independents (Excluding BYU and Notre Dame)	1–2
Mountain West	1–0
Sun Belt	2–2
Other FBS Total	5–8
FCS Opponents	Record
Football Championship Subdivision	10–0
Total Non-Conference Record	17–29

Post Season

Power Conferences 5	Record
ACC	0–1
Big Ten	0–0
Big 12	0–0
BYU/Notre Dame	0-0
Pac-12	0–0
SEC	0–0
Power 5 Total	0–1
Other FBS Conferences	Record
American	0–0
C–USA	1–1
Independents (Excluding Notre Dame)	0–0
Mountain West	2–1
Sun Belt	0–1
Other FBS Total	3–3
Total Bowl Record	3–4

=== Mid-American vs Power 5 matchups ===
This is a list of games the MAC has scheduled versus power conference teams (ACC, Big 10, Big 12, Pac-12, BYU, Notre Dame and SEC). All rankings are from the current AP Poll at the time of the game.

Date	Conference	Visitor	Home	Site	Score
August 29	Pac-12	Kent State	Arizona State	Sun Devil Stadium • Tempe, AZ	L 7–30
August 31	SEC	Toledo	Kentucky	Kroger Field • Lexington, KY	L 24–38
August 31	Big Ten	Akron	Illinois	Memorial Stadium • Champaign, IL	L 3–42
August 31	Big Ten	Indiana	Ball State	Lucas Oil Stadium • Indianapolis, IN	L 24–34
August 31	Big Ten	Miami (OH)	No. 20 Iowa	Kinnick Stadium • Iowa City, IA	L 24–38
September 7	ACC	Ohio	Pittsburgh	Heinz Field • Pittsburgh, PA	L 10–20
September 7	Big 12	Bowling Green	Kansas State	Bill Snyder Family Stadium • Manhattan, KS	L 0–52
September 7	Pac-12	Northern Illinois	No. 13 Utah	Rice–Eccles Stadium • Salt Lake City, UT	L 17–35
September 7	Big Ten	Central Michigan	No. 17 Wisconsin	Camp Randall Stadium • Madison, WI	L 0–61
September 7	SEC	Eastern Michigan	Kentucky	Kroger Field • Lexington, KY	L 17–38
September 7	Big Ten	Western Michigan	No. 19 Michigan State	Spartan Stadium • East Lansing, MI	L 17–51
September 7	Big Ten	Buffalo	No. 15 Penn State	Beaver Stadium • University Park, PA	L 13–45
September 14	Big Ten	Eastern Michigan	Illinois	Memorial Stadium • Champaign, IL	W 34–31
September 14	SEC	Kent State	Auburn	Jordan–Hare Stadium • Auburn, AL	L 16–55
September 14	Big Ten	Northern Illinois	Nebraska	Memorial Stadium • Lincoln, NE	L 8–44
September 21	Big Ten	Miami (OH)	Ohio State	Ohio Stadium • Columbus, OH	L 5–76
September 21	ACC	Central Michigan	Miami (FL)	Hard Rock Stadium • Miami, FL	L 12–17
September 21	ACC	Ball State	NC State	Carter–Finley Stadium • Raleigh, NC	L 23–34
September 21	ACC	Western Michigan	Syracuse	Carrier Dome • Syracuse, NY	L 33–52
September 28	SEC	Northern Illinois	Vanderbilt	Vanderbilt Stadium • Nashville, TN	L 18–24
September 28	Independent	BYU	Toledo	Glass Bowl • Toledo, OH	W 28–21
October 5	Big Ten	Kent State	No. 8 Wisconsin	Camp Randall Stadium • Madison, WI	L 0–48
October 5	Independent	Bowling Green	No. 9 Notre Dame	Notre Dame Stadium • Notre Dame, IN	L 0–52

=== Mid-American vs Group of Five matchups ===
The following games include MAC teams competing against teams from the American, C-USA, Mountain or Sun Belt.

Date	Conference	Visitor	Home	Site	Score
August 31	Sun Belt	Eastern Michigan	Coastal Carolina	Brooks Stadium • Conway, SC	W 30–23
September 7	C-USA	UAB	Akron	InfoCision Stadium • Akron, OH	W 31–23
September 14	American	Miami (OH)	Cincinnati	Nippert Stadium • Cincinnati, OH	L 13–35
September 14	C-USA	Florida Atlantic	Ball State	Scheumann Stadium • Muncie, IN	L 31–41
September 14	C-USA	Louisiana Tech	Bowling Green	Doyt Perry Stadium • Bowling Green, OH	L 7–35
September 14	C-USA	Ohio	Marshall	Joan C. Edwards Stadium • Huntington, WV	L 31–33
September 14	Sun Belt	Georgia State	Western Michigan	Waldo Stadium • Kalamazoo, MI	W 57–10
September 21	Mountain West	Toledo	Colorado State	Canvas Stadium • Fort Collins, CO	W 41–35
September 21	American	Temple	Buffalo	UB Stadium • Buffalo, NY	W 38–22
September 21	Sun Belt	Louisiana	Ohio	Peden Stadium • Athens, OH	L 25–45
September 21	Sun Belt	Troy	Akron	InfoCision Stadium • Akron, OH	L 7–35

=== Mid-American vs FBS independents matchups ===
The following games include MAC teams competing against FBS Independents, which includes Army, Liberty, New Mexico State, or UMass.

Date	Conference	Visitor	Home	Site	Score
September 14	Independents	Buffalo	Liberty	Williams Stadium • Lynchburg, VA	L 17–35
September 28	Independents	Akron	UMass	Warren McGuirk Alumni Stadium • Amherst, MA	L 29–37
October 12	Independents	New Mexico State	Central Michigan	Kelly/Shorts Stadium • Mount Pleasant, MI	W 42–28

=== Mid-American vs FCS matchups ===
Date	Visitor	Home	Site	Score
August 29	Albany	Central Michigan	Kelly/Shorts Stadium • Mount Pleasant, MI	W 38–21
August 29	Morgan State	Bowling Green	Doyt Perry Stadium • Bowling Green, OH	W 46–3
August 29	Robert Morris	Buffalo	UB Stadium • Buffalo, NY	W 38–10
August 31	Rhode Island	Ohio	Peden Stadium • Athens, OH	W 41–20
August 31	Illinois State	Northern Illinois	Huskie Stadium • DeKalb, IL	W 24–10
August 31	Monmouth	Western Michigan	Waldo Stadium • Kalamazoo, MI	W 48–13
September 7	Kennesaw State	Kent State	Dix Stadium • Kent, OH	W 26–23 (OT)
September 7	Fordham	Ball State	Scheumann Stadium • Muncie, IN	W 57–29
September 7	Tennessee Tech	Miami (OH)	Yager Stadium • Miami, OH	W 48–17
September 14	Murray State	Toledo	Glass Bowl • Toledo, OH	W 45–0
September 21	Central Connecticut State	Eastern Michigan	Rynearson Stadium • Ypsilanti, MI	W 34–29

== Postseason ==
=== Bowl games ===
Legend
MAC win
MAC loss

Bowl game	Date	Site	Television	Time (EST)	MAC team	Opponent	Score	Attendance
Bahamas Bowl	December 20	Thomas Robinson Stadium • Nassau, Bahamas	ESPN	2:00 p.m.	Buffalo	Charlotte	31–9	13,547
Frisco Bowl	December 20	Toyota Stadium • Frisco, TX	ESPN2	7:30 p.m.	Kent State	Utah State	51–41	12,120
New Mexico Bowl	December 21	Dreamstyle Stadium • Albuquerque, NM	ESPN	2:00 p.m.	Central Michigan	San Diego State	11–48	18,823
Quick Lane Bowl	December 26	Ford Field • Detroit, MI	ESPN	8:00 p.m.	Eastern Michigan	Pittsburgh	30–34	34,765
First Responder Bowl	December 30	Gerald J. Ford Stadium • Dallas, TX	ESPN	12:30 p.m.	Western Michigan	Western Kentucky	20–23	13,164
Famous Idaho Potato Bowl	January 3, 2020	Albertsons Stadium • Boise, ID	ESPN	3:30 p.m.	Ohio	Nevada	30–21	13,611
LendingTree Bowl	January 6, 2020	Ladd-Peebles Stadium • Mobile, AL	ESPN	7:30 p.m.	Miami (OH)	Louisiana	17–27	29,212

Rankings are from CFP rankings. All times Eastern Time Zone. MAC teams shown in bold.

=== Selection of teams ===
- Bowl eligible: Buffalo, Central Michigan, Eastern Michigan, Kent State, Miami, Ohio, Western Michigan, Toledo
- Bowl-ineligible: Akron, Bowling Green, Ball State, Northern Illinois

== Awards and honors ==
=== Player of the week honors ===
==== East Division ====
Week	Offensive			Defensive			Special Teams		
Week	Player	Team	Position	Player	Team	Position	Player	Team	Position
Week 1 (Sept. 2)	Darius Wade	Bowling Green	QB	Jared Dorse	Ohio	LB	Derek Adams	Kent State	P
Week 2 (Sept. 9)	Dustin Burkhart	Akron	WR	Joey Banks	Buffalo	S	Matthew Trickett	Kent State	K
Week 3 (Sept. 16)	Nathan Rourke	Ohio	QB	Kameron Butler	Miami (OH)	DL	Derek Adams (2)	Kent State	P
Week 4 (Sept. 23)	Dustin Crum	Kent State	QB	Joey Banks (2)	Buffalo	S	Louie Zervos	Ohio	K
Week 5 (Sept. 30)	Jaylon Bester	Miami (OH)	RB	Mike Brown	Miami (OH)	DB	Sam Sloman	Miami (OH)	K
Week 6 (Oct. 5)	O'Shaan Allison	Ohio	RB	Taylor Riggins	Buffalo	DE	Derek Adams (3)	Kent State	P
Week 7 (Oct. 12)	Grant Loy	Bowling Green	QB	Elvis Hines	Kent State	DB	Matthew Trickett (2)	Kent State	K
Week 8 (Oct. 19)	Nathan Rourke (2)	Ohio	QB	Ledarius Mack	Buffalo	DE	Maurice Thomas	Miami (OH)	KR/PR
Week 9 (Oct. 28)	Nathan Rourke (3)	Ohio	QB	Joey Banks (3)	Buffalo	S	Sam Sloman (2)	Miami (OH)	PK
Week 10 (Nov. 4)	Kyle Vantrease	Buffalo	QB	Chibueze Onwuka	Buffalo	DT	Mason Lawler	Bowling Green	K
Week 11 (Nov. 11)	Dustin Crum (2)	Kent State	QB	Sterling Weatherford	Miami (OH)	DB	Sam Sloman (3)	Miami (OH)	K
Week 12 (Nov. 18)	Xavier Williams	Kent State	RB	Travion Banks	Miami (OH)	DB	Matthew Trickett (3)	Kent State	K
Week 13 (Nov. 25)	Dustin Crum (3); Jaret Patterson	Kent State; Buffalo	QB; RB	Ivan Pace Jr.	Miami (OH)	LB	Louie Zervos (2)	Ohio	K
Week 14 (Dec. 2)	Jaret Patterson (2)	Buffalo	RB	KJ Sherald	Kent State	DB	Lonnie Phelps	Miami (OH)	DL

==== West Division ====
Week	Offensive			Defensive			Special Teams		
Week	Player	Team	Position	Player	Team	Position	Player	Team	Position
Week 1 (Sept. 2)	Mike Glass III; Jon Wassink	Eastern Michigan; Western Michigan	QB	Jalen McKie	Northern Illinois	DB	Keith Mixon	Western Michigan	WR/KR/PR
Week 2 (Sept. 9)	Drew Plitt	Ball State	QB	Brody Hoying	Eastern Michigan	DB	Brady Buell	Central Michigan	P
Week 3 (Sept. 16)	Mike Glass III (2)	Eastern Michigan	QB	Treshaun Hayward	Western Michigan	LB	Chad Ryland	Eastern Michigan	K
Week 4 (Sept. 23)	Bryant Koback	Toledo	RB	Sean Adesanya	Central Michigan	DE	Mathew Sexton	Eastern Michigan	WR/PR/KR
Week 5 (Sept. 30)	Shakif Seymour	Toledo	RB	Kahlil Robinson	Toledo	S	Evan Davis	Toledo	K
Week 6 (Oct. 5)	Caleb Huntley; Jonathan Ward	Ball State; Central Michigan	RB	Saeed Holt	Toledo	LB	Ryan Rimmler	Ball State	K
Week 7 (Oct. 12)	Tre Harbison	Northern Illinois	RB	Drake Spears	Western Michigan	LB	John Richardson	Northern Illinois	K
Week 8 (Oct. 19)	Preston Hutchinson	Eastern Michigan	QB	Da'Quaun Jamison	Central Michigan	DB	Jake Julien	Eastern Michigan	P
Week 9 (Oct. 28)	LeVante Bellamy	Western Michigan	RB	Treshaun Hayward (2)	Western Michigan	LB	Ronnie Jones	Toledo	KR
Week 10 (Nov. 4)	Jonathan Ward (2)	Central Michigan	RB	Michael Oliver	Central Michigan	LB	Matt Ference	Northern Illinois	P
Week 11 (Nov. 11)	LeVante Bellamy (2)	Western Michigan	RB	Jamal Hines	Toledo	DE	Malik Dunner	Ball State	KR/PR
Week 12 (Nov. 18)	Jonathan Ward (3)	Central Michigan	RB	Jack Heflin	Northern Illinois	DT	John Richardson (2)	Northern Illinois	K
Week 13 (Nov. 15)	Mike Glass III (3)	Eastern Michigan	QB	Kobie Beltram	Eastern Michigan	LB	Ronnie Jones (2)	Toledo	KR/PR
Week 14 (Dec. 2)	Drew Plitt (2)	Ball State	QB	Michael Oliver (2)	Central Michigan	LB	Matt Ference (2)	Northern Illinois	P

=== MAC Individual Awards ===
The following individuals received postseason honors as voted by the Mid-American Conference football coaches at the end of the season

Award	Player	School
Offensive Player of the Year	LeVante Bellamy	Western Michigan
Defensive Player of the Year	Treshaun Hayward	Western Michigan
Special Teams Player of the Year	Matthew Trickett	Kent State
Freshman Player of the Year	Brett Gabbert	Miami (OH)
Vern Smith Leadership Award	LeVante Bellamy	Western Michigan
Coach of the Year	Jim McElwain	Central Michigan

=== All-conference teams ===
Position	Player	Team
First Team Offense
WR	Kalil Pimpleton	Central Michigan
WR	Justin Hall	Ball State
WR	Skyy Moore	Western Michigan
WR	JaCorey Sullivan	Central Michigan
OL	Danny Pinter	Ball State
OL	Luke Juriga	Western Michigan
OL	Jordan Steckler	Northern Illinois
OL	Evin Ksiezarczyk	Buffalo
OL	Tommy Doyle	Miami (OH)
TE	Giovanni Ricci	Western Michigan
QB	Nathan Rourke	Ohio
RB	LeVante Bellamy	Western Michigan
RB	Jaret Patterson	Buffalo
PK	Matthew Trickett	Kent State
First Team Defense
DL	Sean Adesanya	Central Michigan
DL	Taylor Riggins	Buffalo
DL	Malcolm Koonce	Buffalo
DL	Doug Costin	Miami (OH)
OLB	Treshaun Hayward	Western Michigan
OLB	Troy Brown	Central Michigan
ILB	Jacob White	Ball State
ILB	John Lako	Akron
DB	Joey Banks	Buffalo
DB	Javon Hagan	Ohio
DB	Vince Calhoun	Eastern Michigan
DB	Antonio Phillips	Ball State
P	Kyle Kramer	Miami (OH)
First Team Specialists
KRS	Keith Mixon	Western Michigan
PRS	Kalil Pimpleton	Central Michigan

Position	Player	Team
Second Team Offense
WR	Riley Miller	Ball State
WR	Arthur Jackson	Eastern Michigan
WR	Bryce Mitchell	Toledo
WR	Quintin Morris	Bowling Green
OL	Austen Pleasants	Ohio
OL	Jaylon Moore	Western Michigan
OL	Kayode Awosika	Buffalo
OL	Mike Caliendo	Western Michigan
OL	Paul Nosworthy	Buffalo
TE	Tony Poljan	Central Michigan
QB	Mike Glass III	Eastern Michigan
RB	Bryant Koback	Toledo
RB	Caleb Huntley	Ball State
PK	Sam Sloman	Miami (OH)
Second Team Defense
DL	Ali Fayad	Western Michigan
DL	Jack Heflin	Northern Illinois
DL	Ledarius Mack	Buffalo
DL	Kameron Butler	Miami (OH)
OLB	Brody Hoying	Eastern Michigan
OLB	Kadofi Wright	Buffalo
ILB	Michael Oliver	Central Michigan
ILB	Drake Spears	Western Michigan
DB	Jamal Parker	Kent State
DB	Mykelti Williams	Northern Illinois
DB	Amechi Uzodinma	Ball State
DB	Tyrone Hill	Buffalo
P	Michael Farkas	Ohio
Second Team Specialists
KRS	Malik Dunner	Ball State
PRS	Maurice Thomas	Miami (OH)

Position	Player	Team
Third Team Offense
WR	Isaiah McCoy	Kent State
WR	Antonio Nunn	Buffalo
WR	Mike Carrigan	Kent State
WR	Dylan Drummond	Eastern Michigan
OL	Nick Rosi	Toledo
OL	Danny Godlevske	Miami (OH)
OL	Curtis Blackwell	Ball State
OL	Marques Grimes	Ohio
OL	Steven Hayes	Ohio
TE	Mitchell Brinkman	Northern Illinois
QB	Jon Wassink	Western Michigan
RB	Jonathan Ward	Central Michigan
RB	Tre Harbison	Northern Illinois
PK	John Richardson	Northern Illinois
Third Team Defense
DL	Jamal Hines	Toledo
DL	Chibueze Onwuka	Buffalo
DL	Theo Majette	Kent State
DL	Robi Stuart	Central Michigan
OLB	Myles Reid	Miami (OH)
OLB	Kholbe Coleman	Bowling Green
ILB	Kobie Beltram	Eastern Michigan
ILB	Jaylin Thomas	Ball State
DB	Alvin Davis	Akron
DB	Emmanuel Rugamba	Miami (OH)
DB	Patrick Lupro	Western Michigan
DB	Kevin McGill	Eastern Michigan
P	Derek Adams	Kent State
Third Team Specialists
KRS	DL Knock	Ohio
PRS	Keith Mixon	Western Michigan

*Denotes Unanimous Selection

Ref:

All Conference Honorable Mentions:

=== All-Americans ===
The 2019 College Football All-America Teams are composed of the following College Football All-American first teams chosen by the following selector organizations: Associated Press (AP), Football Writers Association of America (FWAA), American Football Coaches Association (AFCA), Walter Camp Foundation (WCFF), The Sporting News (TSN), Sports Illustrated (SI), USA Today (USAT) ESPN, CBS Sports (CBS), FOX Sports (FOX) College Football News (CFN), Bleacher Report (BR), Scout.com, Phil Steele (PS), SB Nation (SB), Athlon Sports, Pro Football Focus (PFF) and Yahoo! Sports (Yahoo!).

Currently, the NCAA compiles consensus all-America teams in the sports of Division I-FBS football and Division I men's basketball using a point system computed from All-America teams named by coaches associations or media sources. The system consists of three points for a first-team honor, two points for second-team honor, and one point for third-team honor. Honorable mention and fourth team or lower recognitions are not accorded any points. Football consensus teams are compiled by position and the player accumulating the most points at each position is named first team consensus all-American. Currently, the NCAA recognizes All-Americans selected by the AP, AFCA, FWAA, TSN, and the WCFF to determine Consensus and Unanimous All-Americans. Any player named to the First Team by all five of the NCAA-recognized selectors is deemed a Unanimous All-American.

Position	Player	School	Selector	Unanimous	Consensus
First Team All-Americans
None

Position	Player	School	Selector	Unanimous	Consensus
Second Team All-Americans
LB	Treshaun Hayward	Western Michigan	TSN		

*AFCA All-America Team
*AP All-America teams
*CBS Sports All-America Team
*ESPN All-America Team
*FWAA All-America Team
*Sports Illustrated All-America Team
*The Athletic All-America Team
*USA Today All-America Team
*Walter Camp All-America Team
*Sporting News All-America Team

=== National award winners ===
2019 College Football Award Winners

== Home game attendance ==
Team	Stadium	Capacity	Game 1	Game 2	Game 3	Game 4	Game 5	Game 6	Game 7	Total	Average	% of Capacity
Akron	InfoCision Stadium–Summa Field	27,881	18,972	16,954	22,692 †	16,909	10,811	21,414	—	107,752	17,958	
Ball State	Scheumann Stadium	22,500	10,123	14,333	15,113 †	5,572	7,249	7,155	—	59,545	9,924	
Bowling Green	Doyt Perry Stadium	24,000	17,620	18,021	19,199 †	15,100	12,113	9,715	—	91,768	15,294	
Buffalo	UB Stadium	29,013	18,412	17,621	20,042 †	14,850	13,830	13,749	—	98,504	16,417	
Central Michigan	Kelly/Shorts Stadium	30,255	12,207	18,641 †	15,235	15,764	10,438	9,101	—			
Eastern Michigan	Rynearson Stadium	30,200	17,286	17,852	20,528 †	16,017	13,444		—			
Kent State	Dix Stadium	25,319	18,679	19,700 †	8,455	8,450	8,825		—			
Miami (OH)	Yager Stadium	24,286	16,022	18,419	11,710	19,897	22,921 †		—			
Northern Illinois	Huskie Stadium	24,000	14,568 †	10,365	9,027	5,062	3,568		—			
Ohio	Peden Stadium	24,000	16,665	17,416	18,019	15,009	20,589 †	11,700	—			
Toledo	Glass Bowl	26,248	25,361 †	24,889	22,141	18,061	16,331	15,610	—			
Western Michigan	Waldo Stadium	30,200	15,021	22,328 †	20,476	21,702	16,778	11,314	—			

Bold – Exceed capacity
†Season High

== NFL draft ==
The following list includes all MAC players who were drafted in the 2020 NFL draft.

Player	Position	School	Draft Round	Round Pick	Overall Pick	Team
Danny Pinter	G	Ball State	5	3	149	Indianapolis Colts
Sam Sloman	K	Miami (OH)	7	34	248	Los Angeles Rams
