= Doug Costin =

American football player (born 1997)

No. 58
- Position: Defensive tackle

Personal information
- Born: October 5, 1997 (age 29); West Chester, Pennsylvania, U.S.
- Listed height: 6 ft 2 in (1.88 m)
- Listed weight: 295 lb (134 kg)

Career information
- High school: Bishop Shanahan (Downingtown, Pennsylvania)
- College: Miami (OH)
- NFL draft: 2020: undrafted

Career history
- Jacksonville Jaguars (2020–2021)*; Cincinnati Bengals (2021)*; Birmingham Stallions (2022); Pittsburgh Steelers (2022)*; Arlington Renegades (2023); Las Vegas Raiders (2023)*; Arlington Renegades (2024)*
- * Offseason or practice squad member only

Awards and highlights
- XFL champion (2023); USFL champion (2022); First-team All-MAC (2019); Second-team All-MAC (2018)

Career NFL statistics
- Total tackles: 32
- Fumble recoveries: 1
- Pass deflections: 2
- Stats at Pro Football Reference

Doug Costin (born October 5, 1997) is an American former professional football player who was a defensive tackle in the National Football League (NFL). He played college football for the Miami RedHawks.

== College career ==
Costin played college football at Miami University in Oxford, Ohio. Costin was a three year starter at Miami, where he played in 50 career games with 178 total tackles and 17 sacks throughout his college career along with being named First-team All-MAC in 2019.

== Professional career ==
Pre-draft measurables
Height	Weight	Arm length	Hand span	40-yard dash	10-yard split	20-yard split	20-yard shuttle	Three-cone drill	Vertical jump	Broad jump	Bench press
6 ft 2 3/8 in (1.89 m)	291 lb (132 kg)	31 1/2 in (0.80 m)	10 1/8 in (0.26 m)	5.30 s	1.81 s	3.02 s	4.53 s	7.44 s	26.0 in (0.66 m)	8 ft 3 in (2.51 m)	24 reps
All values from Pro Day

=== Jacksonville Jaguars ===
Costin went undrafted in the 2020 NFL draft. He was signed by the Jacksonville Jaguars on April 25, 2020.

On August 31, 2021, Costin was waived by the Jaguars and re-signed to the practice squad the next day.

=== Cincinnati Bengals ===
On January 18, 2022, the Cincinnati Bengals signed Costin to their practice squad. He was released on January 25.

=== Birmingham Stallions ===
Costin signed with the Birmingham Stallions of the United States Football League on May 20, 2022, and was subsequently moved to the inactive roster. He was transferred to the active roster later that day.

=== Pittsburgh Steelers ===
On July 19, 2022, Costin signed a one-year contract with the Pittsburgh Steelers. He was released on August 16, 2022.

=== Arlington Renegades (first stint) ===
Costin was selected by the Arlington Renegades in the 2023 XFL draft. He was released from his contract on August 23, 2023.

=== Las Vegas Raiders ===
On August 23, 2023, Costin signed with the Las Vegas Raiders. He was released on August 27, 2023.

=== Arlington Renegades (second stint) ===
On February 1, 2024, Costin re-signed with the Renegades. He was released on March 10, 2024.
