= Montenegro–United States relations =

- Montenegro: United States

Diplomatic mission
- Embassy of Montenegro, Washington, D.C.: Embassy of the United States, Podgorica

According to the 2012 U.S. Global Leadership Report, 26% of Montenegrins approve of U.S. leadership, with 48% disapproving and 26% uncertain.

== History ==
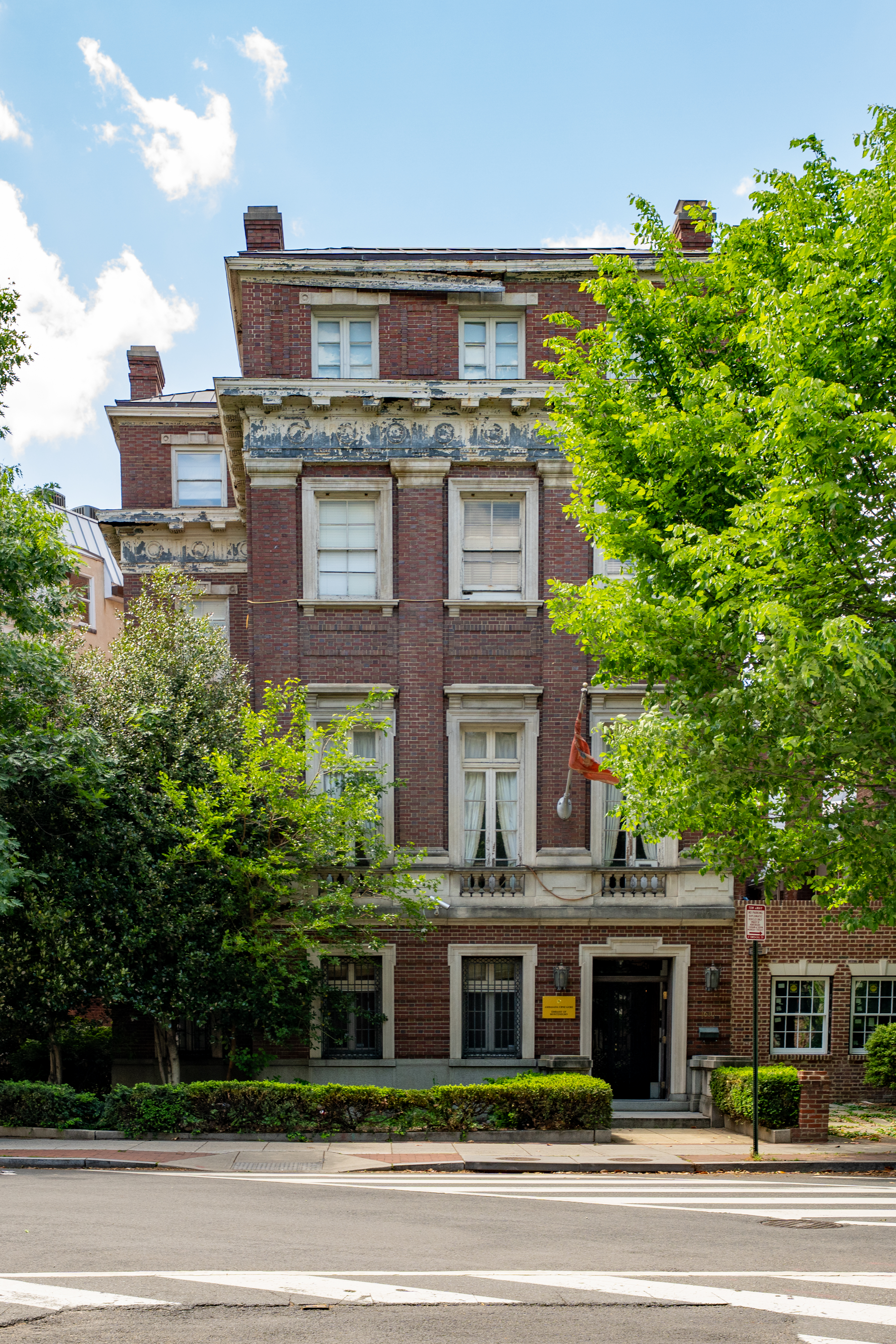
Embassy of Montenegro in the Dupont Circle neighborhood of Washington, D.C.

Relations between the United States and Principality of Montenegro existed from 1905 and lasted until the latter was annexed into the Kingdom of Yugoslavia. During World War II, the United States Army Air Forces bombed Podgorica due to Nazi occupation in Montenegro.

=== Đukanović and United States-Yugoslavia relations ===
Republic of Montenegro–United States relations

- Montenegro: United States

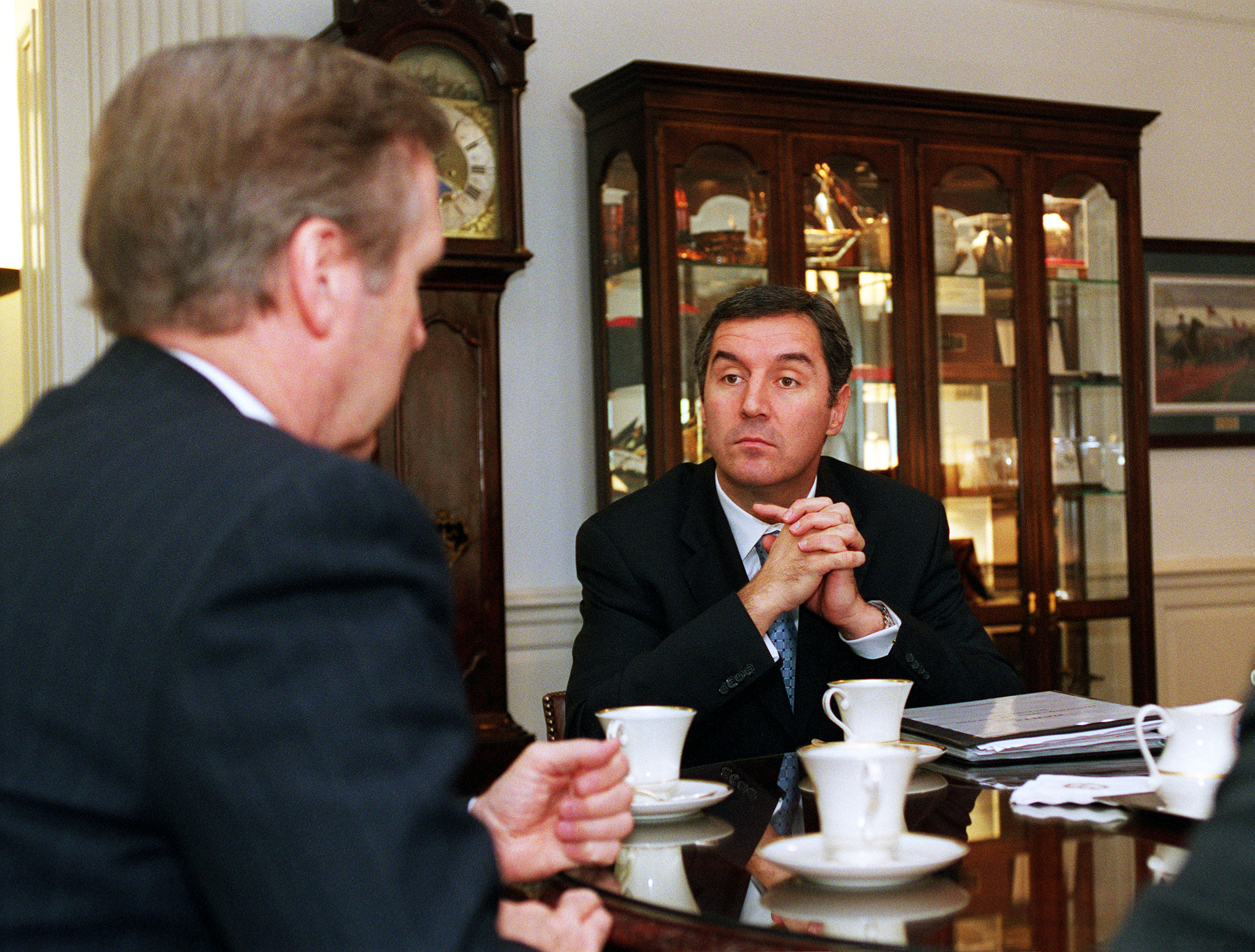
Milo Đukanović at the Pentagon in November 1999, meeting with US Secretary of Defence William Cohen.

When Milo Đukanović first emerged on the political scene, he was a close ally of Slobodan Milošević. However, in the years up to the 1999 NATO bombing of Yugoslavia, he gradually became pro-western. Milošević and other members of his governing coalition were considered pariahs by every western government, so Đukanović became one of the few elected politicians within FR Yugoslavia they would openly communicate with. They were willing to overlook Đukanović's communist past, initial pro-war stance, and mounting evidence of criminal involvement, allowing him to regularly meet with Clinton administration officials such as Secretary of State Madeleine Albright, Secretary of Defense William Cohen and National Security Adviser Sandy Berger as well as British PM Tony Blair, British Foreign Secretary Robin Cook and NATO Secretary-General Javier Solana all throughout this period. Some credited Đukanović for the fact that Montenegro was spared from the brunt of the 1999 NATO bombing of Yugoslavia that devastated the infrastructure of Serbia, suffering no greater destruction. Others find it more reasonable to conclude that he did so only for pragmatic reasons and foresaw great incentives in communicating with Western leaders to push for political separatism.

=== Post-referendum relations ===
The United States recognized Montenegro on June 12, 2006, and formally established diplomatic relations on August 15. The U.S. maintains an embassy in Podgorica. A variety of U.S. assistance programs are currently in place in Montenegro to help improve the economic climate and strengthen democracy. These programs include initiatives to prepare the country for World Trade Organization accession and to promote local economic growth and business development.

Montenegro maintains an embassy to the United States in Washington, D.C. and a consulate general in New York City.

== Military relations ==
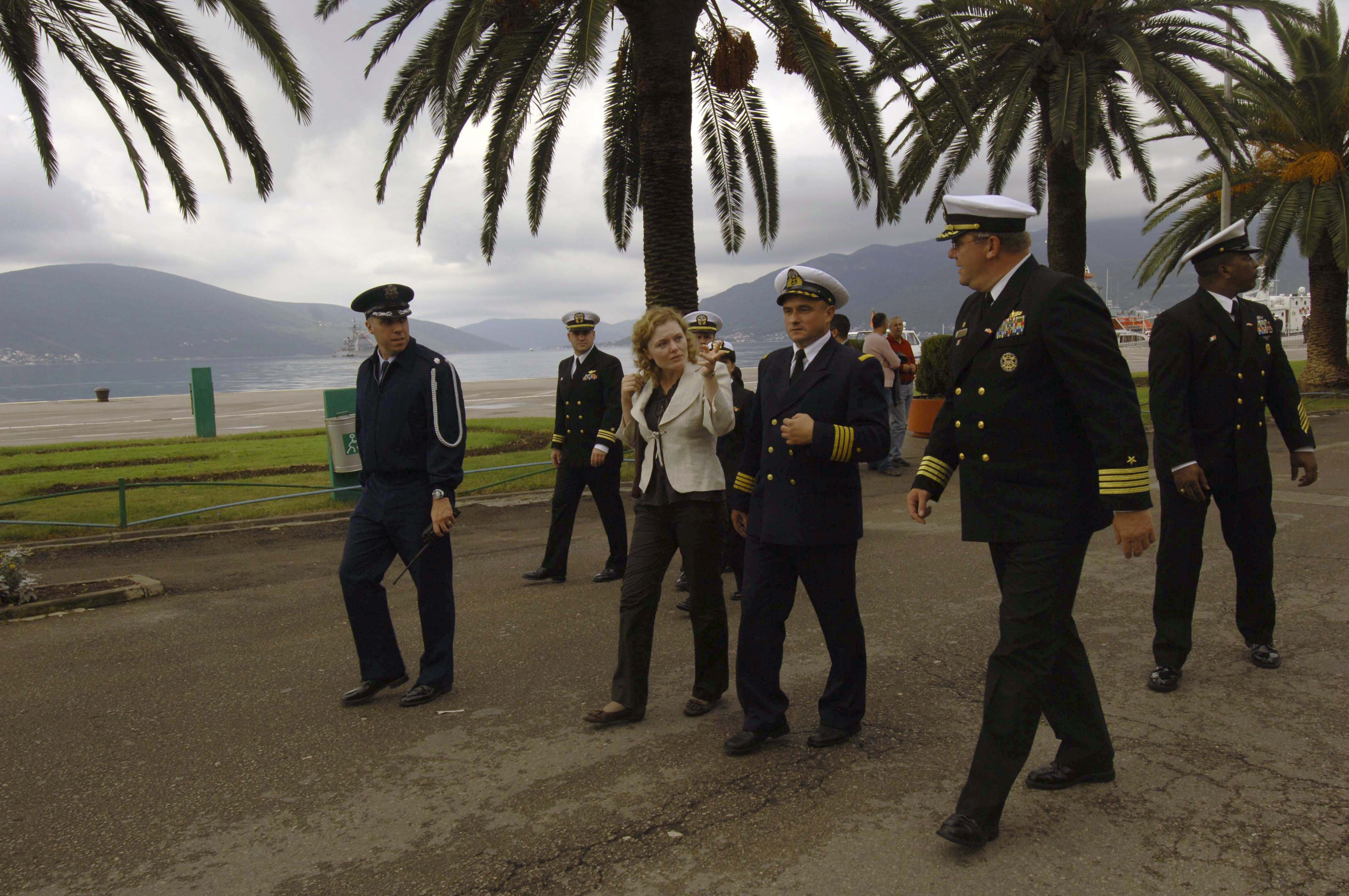
Personnel of USS Anzio (CG-68) walking in Tivat, Montenegro.

The United States has had an active policy regarding military cooperation with Montenegro's military forces, mainly to improve Montenegrin standards necessary for eventual membership in NATO (which eventuated in 2017). Public opinion in Montenegro regarding NATO membership has been cited to be very negative, largely due to the bombing of FR Yugoslavia. In August 2006, Defense Secretary Donald Rumsfeld paid an official visit to Montenegro, seeking support for the war on terror and overall American geopolitical goals in Europe. Following the Secretary's meeting with Montenegrin Prime Minister Milo Đukanović, it was announced that Montenegro had agreed in principle to aid the US efforts in Iraq and Afghanistan, although no specific pledges of aid were made.

=== United States Navy in Montenegro ===
The United States Navy has maintained a regular presence on the Montenegrin coast since 2003. The United States has on many occasions sent destroyers to the port of Bar for naval training, exercises, and regular patrol of traffic in the Mediterranean Sea.

== See also ==
- Montenegrin Americans
- United States–Yugoslavia relations
