= Ledarius Mack =

American football player (born 1996)

No. 43
- Position: Linebacker

Personal information
- Born: October 3, 1996 (age 30); Vero Beach, Florida, U.S.
- Listed height: 5 ft 10 in (1.78 m)
- Listed weight: 234 lb (106 kg)

Career information
- High school: Lincoln Park Academy (Fort Pierce, Florida)
- College: Buffalo
- NFL draft: 2020: undrafted

Career history
- Chicago Bears (2020–2021)

Career NFL statistics
- Total tackles: 3
- Stats at Pro Football Reference

Ledarius Mack (born October 3, 1996) is an American former professional football linebacker. Mack played college football at Buffalo and was signed as an undrafted free agent following the 2020 NFL draft. He is the younger brother of linebacker Khalil Mack.

== Early life and education ==
Mack was born on October 3, 1996, in Vero Beach, Florida. He attended Lincoln Park Academy in Fort Pierce, Florida, and played college football at Buffalo. He was redshirted his first season at Buffalo in 2017. He appeared in 14 games in 2018, posting 14 tackles with two sacks. In 2019, he played in 13 games, making one start, and had eight sacks.

== Professional career ==
Pre-draft measurables
Height	Weight	Arm length	Hand span	40-yard dash	10-yard split	20-yard split	20-yard shuttle	Three-cone drill	Vertical jump	Broad jump
5 ft 10 7/8 in (1.80 m)	234 lb (106 kg)	31 5/8 in (0.80 m)	9 1/2 in (0.24 m)	4.66 s	1.60 s	2.63 s	4.56 s	6.97 s	33.5 in (0.85 m)	10 ft 8 in (3.25 m)
All values from Pro Day

Mack signed with the Chicago Bears as an undrafted free agent following the 2020 NFL draft. He was released at roster cuts but later signed to the practice squad. He did not make any appearances in his rookie season.

Mack was waived/injured by the Bears on August 17, 2021 and placed on injured reserve. He was subsequently released with an injury settlement. He was re-signed by the Bears on October 13, to the practice squad. Mack was promoted to the active roster for the first time in his career on November 20. He made his NFL debut the following day against the Baltimore Ravens and recorded a tackle in the contest. He was promoted to the active roster again on December 18. He was waived on December 21 and re-signed to the practice squad. He signed a reserve/future contract with the Bears on January 11, 2022. He was waived on May 9.
