= Khalil Mack =

American football player (born 1991)

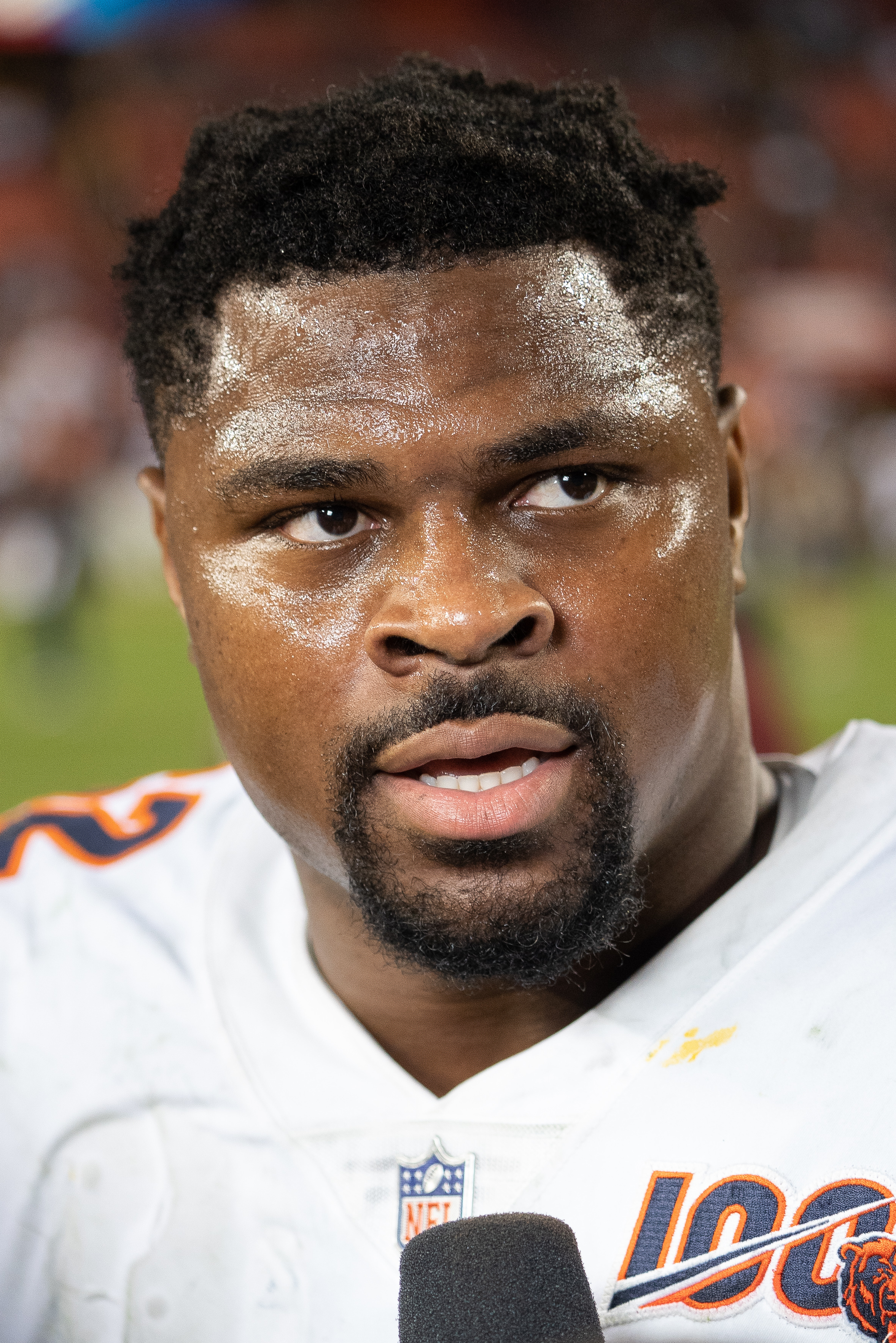
- Mack with the Chicago Bears in 2019

No. 52 – Los Angeles Chargers
- Position: Outside linebacker
- Roster status: Active

Personal information
- Born: February 22, 1991 (age 35); Fort Pierce, Florida, U.S.
- Listed height: 6 ft 3 in (1.91 m)
- Listed weight: 269 lb (122 kg)

Career information
- High school: Fort Pierce Westwood
- College: Buffalo (2009–2013)
- NFL draft: 2014: 1st round, 5th overall pick

Career history
- Oakland Raiders (2014–2017); Chicago Bears (2018–2021); Los Angeles Chargers (2021–present)

Awards and highlights
- NFL Defensive Player of the Year (2016); 4× First-team All-Pro (2015 (Note: Selected as a defensive end and outside linebacker), 2016, 2018); Second-team All-Pro (2020); 9× Pro Bowl (2015–2020, 2022–2024); NFL 2010s All-Decade Team; 2× Butkus Award (2016, 2018); PFWA All-Rookie Team (2014); 100 Greatest Bears of All-Time; MAC Defensive Player of the Year (2013); First-team All-American (2013); 3× First-team All-MAC (2011–2013); NCAA (FBS) records: Career tackles-for-loss: 75 (Note: Tied with Jason Babin)

Career NFL statistics as of Week 10, 2026
- Tackles: 686
- Sacks: 116.0
- Forced fumbles: 36
- Fumble recoveries: 13
- Interceptions: 3
- Defensive touchdowns: 2
- Stats at Pro Football Reference

Khalil Mack (kə-LEEL; born February 22, 1991) is an American professional football outside linebacker for the Los Angeles Chargers of the National Football League (NFL). He played college football for the Buffalo Bulls and was selected by the Oakland Raiders with the fifth overall pick in the 2014 NFL draft.

Mack set the all-time NCAA record for forced fumbles and is also tied for career tackles for loss in the NCAA. In 2015, he became the first player in NFL history to be selected first-team All-Pro at two different positions, defensive end and outside linebacker, in the same season. Three years later, Mack was traded to the Chicago Bears for two first-round draft picks and signed a six-year, $141 million extension, becoming the highest-paid defensive player in NFL history at the time. He was traded to the Chargers in 2022.

== Early life ==
Mack was raised by his parents: Yolanda, a teacher, and Sandy Mack Sr., a program specialist, in Fort Pierce, Florida. He has two brothers: Sandy Jr. and LeDarius. Mack's father introduced him to sports at age five. Mack took an early liking to baseball and basketball although he played Pop Warner football.

Mack attended Fort Pierce Westwood High School in Fort Pierce. For the majority of his athletic career, Mack had been relying on basketball to get him a college scholarship, but his plans were dashed by a tear in his patella tendon before his sophomore season. After this injury, his high school football coach, Waides Ashmon, recruited Mack to the sport, promising him and his parents that it would earn him a scholarship. Mack had played quarterback and was nicknamed "Bombshell Man." However, throwing the ball short was a major struggle for Mack, so he decided to become a linebacker.

In his only year of high school football, Mack had 140 tackles, including eight for a loss, and nine sacks. He was named third-team All-State in Florida, as well as first-team All-Area, and helped lead the Panthers to a district championship. Being a newcomer to the sport, Mack was rated as only a two-star recruit by Rivals.com and was not rated by ESPN's recruiting service. He received a scholarship from the University at Buffalo to play Division I football.

== College career ==
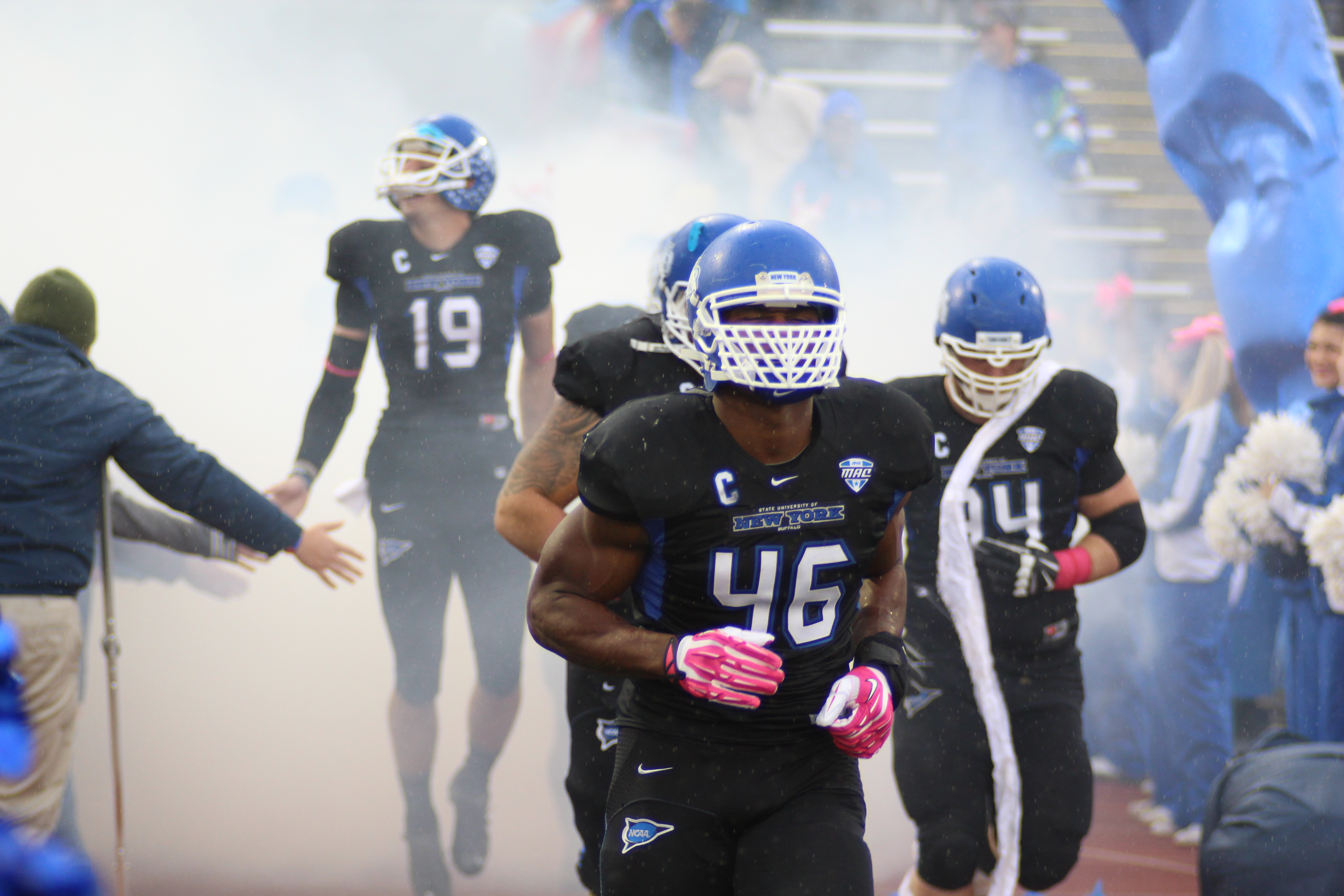
Mack (46) in 2013

After redshirting as a freshman in 2009, Mack broke into the Bulls' starting lineup and was one of the most productive defenders in the Mid-American Conference (MAC). He totaled 68 tackles, including 14 1/2 for loss, 4 1/2 sacks, 10 pass breakups, eight quarterback hurries, and two forced fumbles. Mack earned third-team all-conference honors. He chose to wear the uniform number 46 as a motivational reminder that his true potential was not being recognized – 46 was the overall rating assigned to him (out of a maximum of 99) in EA Sports' college football video game, NCAA Football 11.

Mack continued where he left off in 2010, with a dominant sophomore season. Mack led the team in sacks, tackles for loss, and forced fumbles, on the way to being named first-team All-MAC. He recorded 64 total tackles, including 20 1/2 for loss (third best in the nation), 5 1/2 sacks, one interception, two pass breakups, thirteen quarterback hurries, and five forced fumbles. Despite being suspended for the first game of the season following an altercation with teammate wide receiver Fred Lee, Mack set career highs in tackles (94), tackles for loss (21 – fourth in the nation), and sacks (8). He also recorded two pass breakups, four quarterback hurries, and four forced fumbles. Mack earned first-team all-conference honors for the second consecutive season.

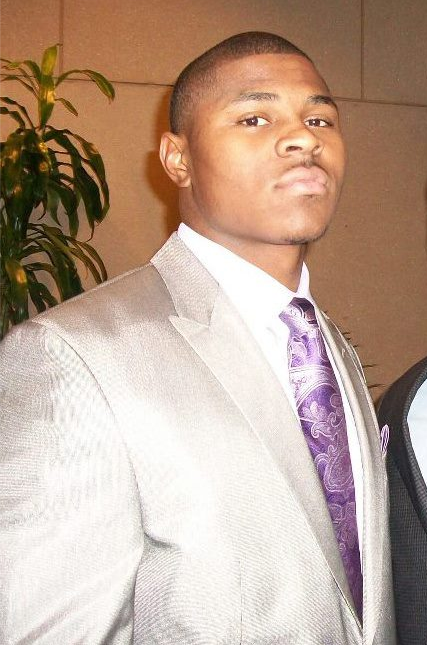
Mack in 2013

Starting all 13 games, Mack recorded 100 tackles including 19 tackles for loss, 10.5 sacks, three interceptions, one of which he returned for a touchdown, and forced five fumbles. Mack won the CFPA Linebacker Trophy for the 2013 season, and was named the 2013 MAC Defensive Player of the Year, becoming the first Bull to win the award in Buffalo's history within the MAC (1999–present). He was also named a second-team All-American by the Associated Press (AP). Mack finished tied for first for the NCAA in career tackles for loss with 75 and set a new record for forced fumbles with 16. Buffalo's independent student newspaper, The Spectrum, also ranked Mack as the best Buffalo football player in the Division I history of the program. Mack was elected to the University at Buffalo Athletics Hall of Fame as part of the class of 2024.

== Professional career ==
=== Pre-draft ===
Leading up to the 2014 NFL draft, Mack was projected as a high first-round pick in many mock drafts.

Pre-draft measurables
Height	Weight	Arm length	Hand span	Wingspan	40-yard dash	10-yard split	20-yard split	20-yard shuttle	Three-cone drill	Vertical jump	Broad jump	Bench press	Wonderlic
6 ft 2 5/8 in (1.90 m)	251 lb (114 kg)	33 1/4 in (0.84 m)	10 1/4 in (0.26 m)	6 ft 9 1/8 in (2.06 m)	4.55 s	1.53 s	2.57 s	4.18 s	7.08 s	40 in (1.02 m)	10 ft 8 in (3.25 m)	23 reps	17
All values from NFL Combine/Pro Day

=== Oakland Raiders ===
==== 2014 ====
Mack was selected with the fifth overall pick by the Oakland Raiders, making him the highest selected Buffalo player ever, and the only one selected in the first round. Previously, the highest selected player from Buffalo was defensive tackle Gerry Philbin, who was selected with the 33rd overall pick by the New York Jets in 1964. Mack chose to switch from his college uniform number, 46, to 52 in order to comply with the NFL's numbering rules. After signing a four-year contract worth $18.67 million guaranteed, Mack made his NFL debut in the season-opener against the Jets, recording six tackles during the 19–14 loss. During Week 7 against the Arizona Cardinals, he recorded a season-high 11 tackles in the 24–13 loss. During a Week 11 13–6 road loss to the San Diego Chargers, Mack recorded five tackles and his first career sack on Philip Rivers. Three weeks later against the San Francisco 49ers, Mack recorded two tackles and sacked Colin Kaepernick twice in the 24–13 victory. This was Mack's first game with multiple sacks in his career.

Mack finished his rookie year with 76 combined tackles (59 solo), four sacks, a forced fumble, and three pass deflections in 16 games and starts. By the end of his rookie season, Mack was considered a candidate for AP Defensive Rookie of the Year. He eventually finished in third place in Defensive Rookie of the Year voting behind defensive tackle Aaron Donald of the St. Louis Rams and linebacker C. J. Mosley of the Baltimore Ravens. However, Mack was named the Defensive Rookie of the Year by analysts on ESPN's NFL Live and was one of three linebackers selected to USA Football's sixth annual All-Fundamentals Team (the others being All-Pro veterans Luke Kuechly of the Carolina Panthers and Tamba Hali of the Kansas City Chiefs). He was named to the PFWA All-Rookie Team. He was ranked 49th by his fellow players on the NFL Top 100 Players of 2015.

==== 2015 ====
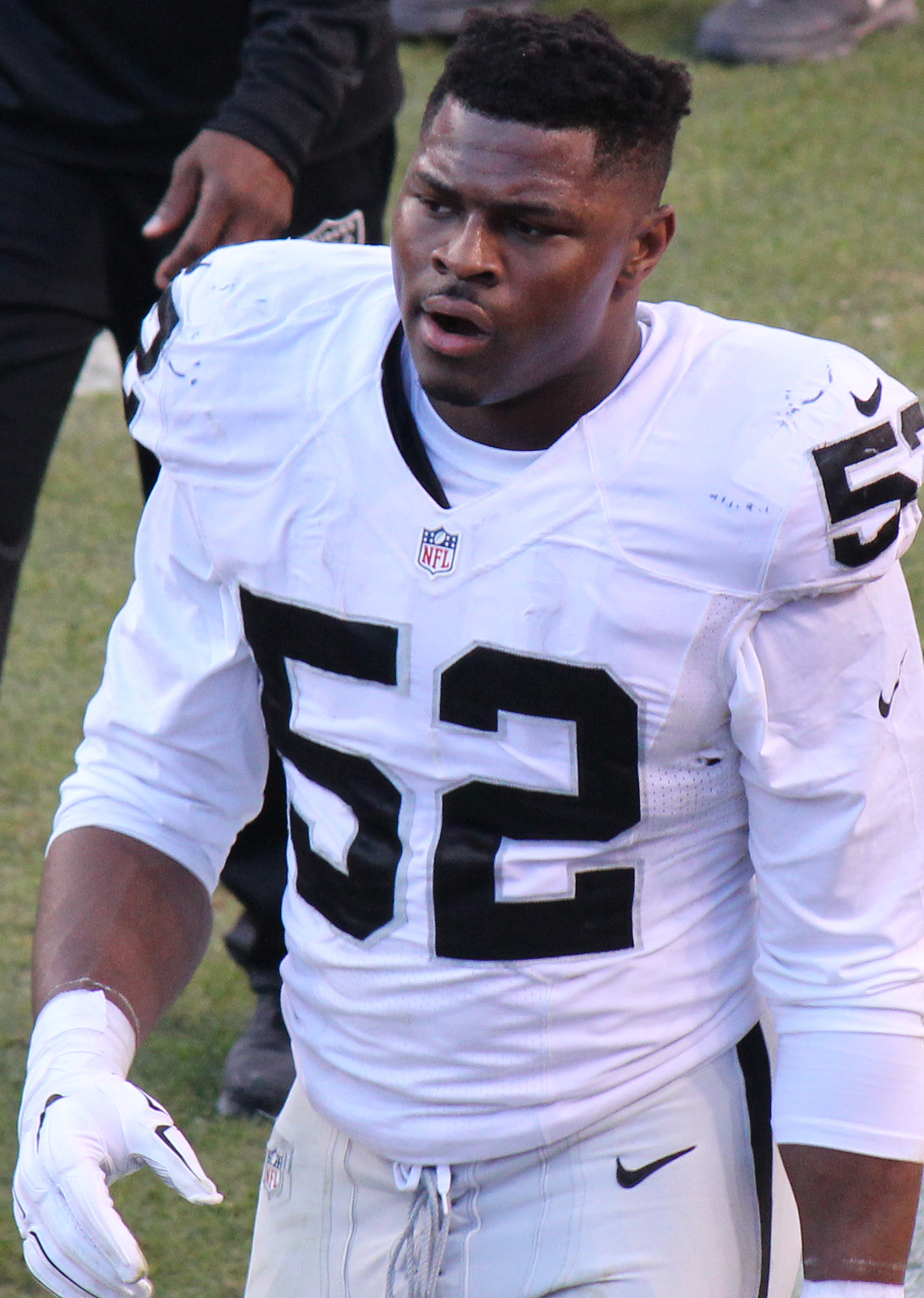
Mack with the Oakland Raiders in 2015

In March 2015, the NFL amended the league's uniform numbering rules to allow linebackers to wear the numbers 40–49. As a result, Mack considered reverting from the number 52 to 46, the number he wore during his college career, but ultimately decided not to do so. In August 2015, Mack was named as the NFL's number one "making the leap" player. Before the start of the season, he shifted from linebacker to right defensive end and played at both positions.

During a Week 3 27–20 road victory over the Cleveland Browns, Mack recorded four tackles and his first two sacks of the season on Josh McCown. During a Week 13 18–13 road loss to the Detroit Lions, he had eight tackles and sacked Matthew Stafford twice. In the next game against the Tennessee Titans, Mack recorded six tackles and another two sacks on rookie Marcus Mariota during the 24–21 road victory.

During a Week 15 road matchup against the Denver Broncos, Mack sacked Brock Osweiler five times, tying a franchise record for sacks in a game previously set by defensive end Howie Long in 1983. This was Mack's third game in a row in which he recorded multiple sacks. The game, which the Raiders won 15–12, was the franchise's first victory over the Broncos since September 2011. The following week, Mack was voted to his first Pro Bowl, along with teammates safety Charles Woodson and fullback Marcel Reece.

Mack finished his second professional season with 77 combined tackles (57 solo), 15 sacks, two forced fumbles, and two pass deflections in 16 games and starts. At the end of the season, Mack became the first player in NFL history to make the AP All-Pro First Team at two positions in the same year: right defensive end and outside linebacker. He was ranked 13th by his fellow players on the NFL Top 100 Players of 2016.

==== 2016 ====
During a narrow Week 4 28–27 road victory over the Ravens, Mack recorded six tackles and his first sack of the season on Joe Flacco. During Week 8 against the Tampa Bay Buccaneers, Mack had a team-high seven tackles and sacked Jameis Winston twice in 30–24 overtime road victory. In the next game against the Broncos, Mack recorded three tackles and sacked Trevor Siemian twice, including a strip sack that he recovered during the 30–20 victory. He was named AFC Defensive Player of the Week for his performance against the Broncos.

During a Week 12 35–32 victory over the Panthers, Mack recorded his first NFL interception off a pass by Cam Newton and returned it six yards for his first NFL touchdown. Mack also forced a fumble from Newton in the final minute of the game to seal the win for the Raiders. Mack finished the game with an interception, a sack, a forced fumble, a fumble recovery, and a defensive touchdown, making him the first player since Charles Woodson in 2009 to do so. Mack's performance earned him AFC Defensive Player of the Week honors. He was also named AFC Defensive Player of the Month for November, registering four sacks, two forced fumbles, and a pick-six. In the next game against the Buffalo Bills, Mack recorded seven tackles and a strip sack on Tyrod Taylor and recovered the football late in the fourth quarter to seal the 38–24 victory.

Mack finished the 2016 season with 73 combined tackles (54 solo), 11 sacks, five forced fumbles, three fumble recoveries, three passes defended, and an interception returned for a touchdown in 16 games and starts. He helped lead the Raiders to their first playoff appearance since 2002 and was named to his second consecutive Pro Bowl and First-team All-Pro. During the Wild Card Round against the Houston Texans, Mack recorded a team-high 11 tackles in the 27–14 road loss. He was named NFL Defensive Player of the Year for the 2016 season. Mack was ranked fifth by his peers on the NFL Top 100 Players of 2017 as the highest-ranked defensive lineman. He was also named the professional winner of the Butkus Award.

==== 2017 ====
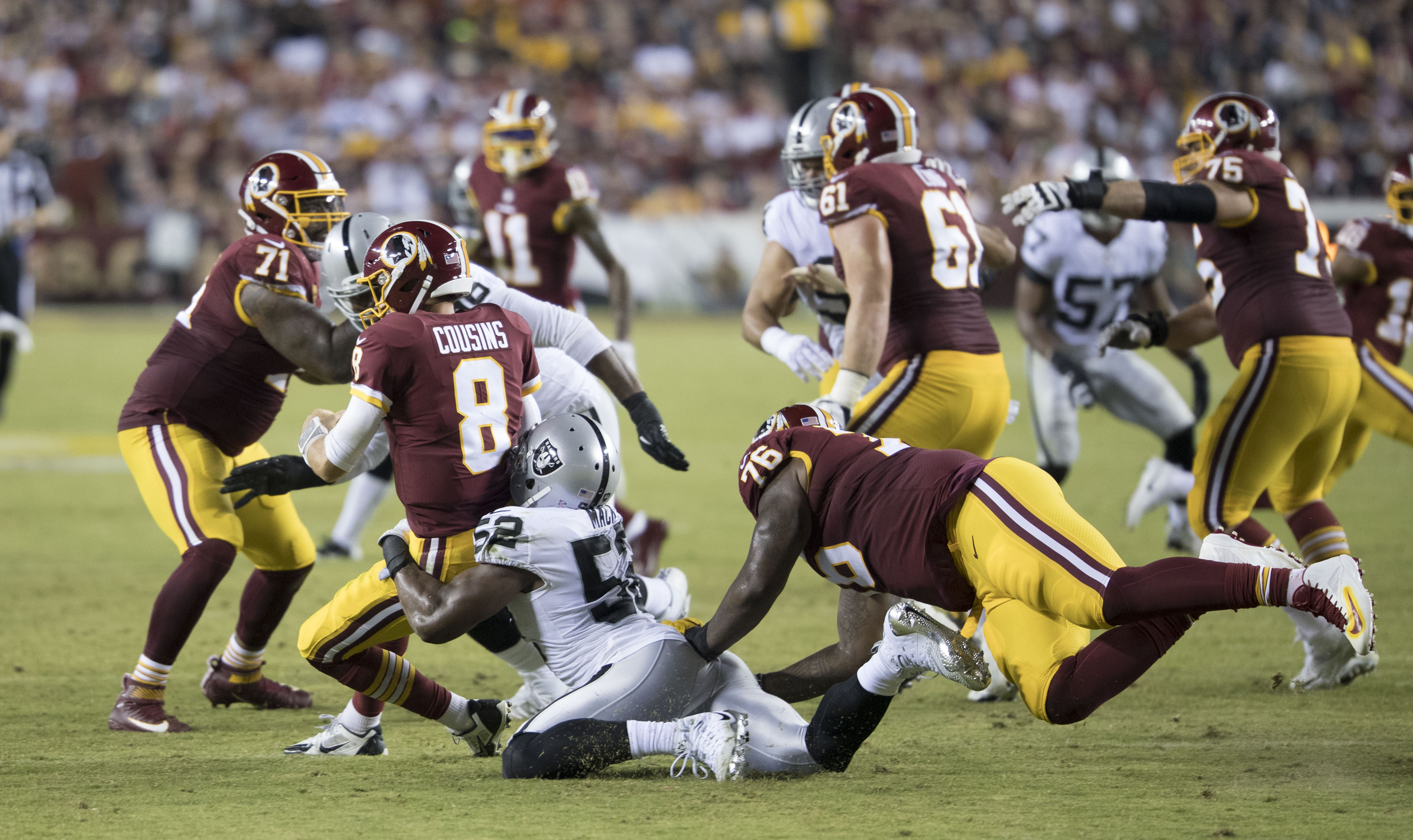
Mack sacking Kirk Cousins in 2017

On April 20, 2017, the Raiders picked up the fifth-year option on Mack's contract. Heading into his fourth season, Mack had his eyes set on the single-season sack record.

During a Week 2 45–20 victory over the Jets, Mack recorded four tackles and his first sack of the season on Josh McCown. In the next game against the Redskins, Mack recorded a team-high nine tackles and sacked Kirk Cousins once during the 27–10 road loss.

Following a Week 10 bye, Mack registered at least one sack in five consecutive games from Week 11 to 15. On December 19, 2017, Mack was named to his third straight Pro Bowl.

Mack finished the 2017 season with 78 combined tackles (61 solo), 10.5 sacks, a forced fumble, a fumble recovery, and three pass deflections in 16 games and starts. He was ranked 16th by his fellow players on the NFL Top 100 Players of 2018.

=== Chicago Bears ===
==== 2018 ====
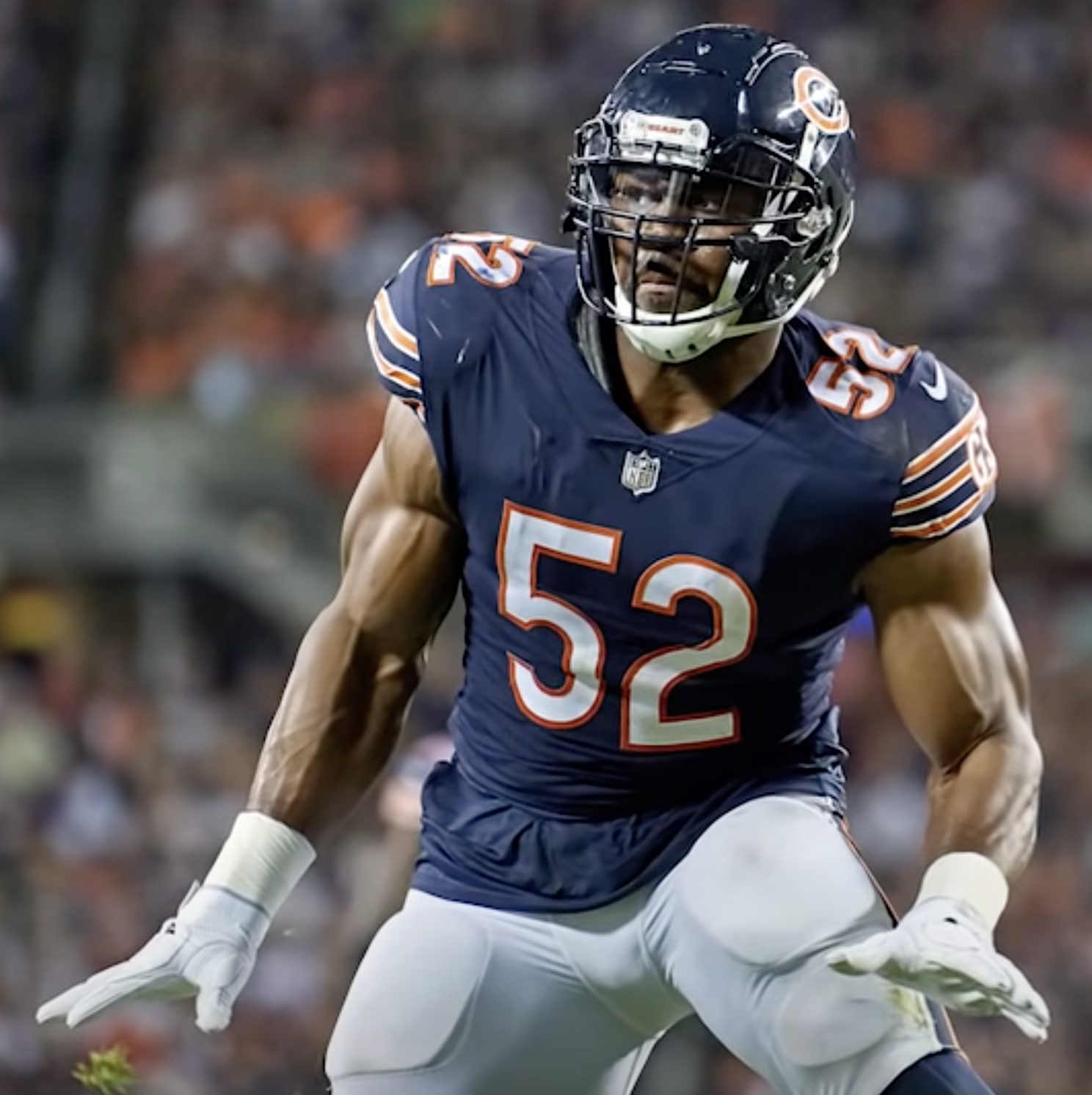
Mack in 2018

On September 1, 2018, following Mack's holdout through the entire preseason, the Raiders traded him, a 2020 second-round pick (Cole Kmet), and a conditional 2020 fifth-round draft pick (eventually turned into a 2020 seventh-round pick, Arlington Hambright) to the Chicago Bears for a 2019 first-round pick (24th overall, Josh Jacobs), a 2020 first-round pick (19th overall, Damon Arnette), a 2019 sixth-round pick (later traded along with Kelechi Osemele to the New York Jets), and a 2020 third-round pick (Bryan Edwards). Shortly after the trade, Mack signed a six-year extension with the Bears worth $141 million ($90 million guaranteed), becoming the highest-paid defender in NFL history.

Mack made his Bears debut on Sunday Night Football in the season-opener against the Packers. During the second quarter, he recorded a strip-sack on backup quarterback DeShone Kizer, who was playing in relief of Aaron Rodgers due to a knee injury. Later in the same quarter, he intercepted a pass from Kizer and returned it for a 27-yard touchdown. The Bears narrowly lost on the road 24–23 after Rodgers returned. Mack became the first player since 1982 to record a sack, forced fumble, a fumble recovery, interception, and touchdown in one half. It was also his second time recording a sack, forced fumble, fumble recovery, interception and touchdown in a single game. In his second game with the Bears, Mack had four tackles and strip-sacked Russell Wilson once during a 24–17 Monday Night Football victory over the Seattle Seahawks. Mack continued his excellent play the following week, recording five tackles and a strip-sack on Josh Rosen in a narrow 16–14 road victory over the Cardinals. This was the first time a player recorded strip-sacks in three straight games since Mack did it himself in 2016. During a Week 4 48–10 victory over the Buccaneers, Mack had four tackles and another strip-sack. He became the first player to record sacks and forced fumbles in four straight games since Colts outside linebacker Robert Mathis did so in 2005. Mack also became the first player to record forced fumbles in the first four games of a season since Jaguars defensive end Tony Brackens did so in 1999. Mack was named NFC Defensive Player of the Month for September after recording 17 tackles, five sacks, four forced fumbles, two pass deflections, a fumble recovery, and an interception returned for a touchdown. He was the first Bears player to win this award since cornerback Charles Tillman in October 2012.

During a Week 6 31–28 overtime road loss to the Miami Dolphins, Mack recorded two tackles before suffering an ankle injury that resulted in him missing the first game of his career two weeks later against the Jets. Despite Mack's absence, the Bears limited the Jets to 207 total yards, including just 57 rushing, as Chicago won 24–10. He returned in a Week 10 Thanksgiving matchup against the Lions; in the latter's 34–22 Bears victory, Mack had five tackles and sacked Matthew Stafford twice.

During a Week 15 24–17 victory over the Packers, Mack recorded 2.5 sacks and two tackles for losses. On his half-sack, Mack was turned around backward by offensive lineman Jason Spriggs; unable to see Rodgers, Mack helped Bilal Nichols bring Rodgers down for a sack by using his back. The victory clinched the NFC North for the Bears and eliminated the Packers from postseason contention.

Mack finished the 2018 season with 47 combined tackles (37 solo), 12.5 sacks, six forced fumbles, two fumble recoveries, four pass deflections, and an interception returned for a touchdown in 14 games and 13 starts; his 12.5 sacks were the most by a Bears player since Richard Dent in 1993. During the Wild Card Round against the Philadelphia Eagles, Mack had six tackles in the narrow 16–15 loss. He was later selected to his fourth Pro Bowl and his third first-team All-Pro, though Mack did not participate in the former due to injury. He received an overall grade of 90.7 from Pro Football Focus in 2018, which ranked as the second highest grade among all qualifying edge defenders. Mack finished second in AP Defensive Player of the Year voting. In June 2019, he received his second career pro Butkus Award. Mack was ranked third by his fellow players on the NFL Top 100 Players of 2019.

==== 2019 ====
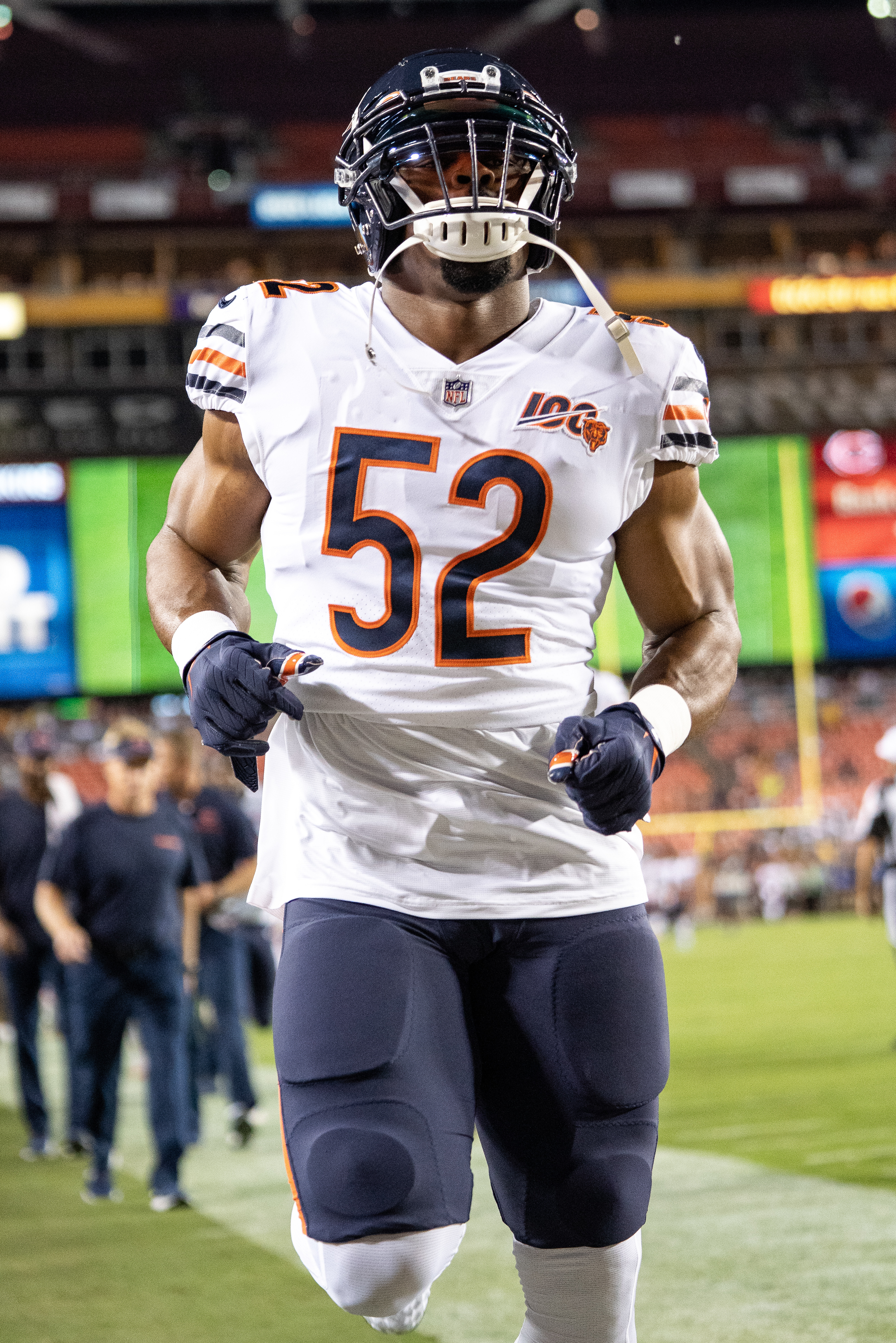
Mack in 2019

During a narrow Week 2 16–14 road victory over the Broncos, Mack recorded a tackle and his first sack of the season on Joe Flacco. In the next game against the Washington Redskins, Mack had four tackles, two forced fumbles, and sacked Case Keenum twice during the 31–15 road victory.

During Week 8 against the Los Angeles Chargers, Mack recorded four tackles, two pass deflections, and his first sack in a month on Philip Rivers in the narrow 17–16 loss.

On December 17, 2019, Mack was named a starter for the 2020 Pro Bowl. He finished the 2019 season with 47 combined tackles (40 solo), 8.5 sacks, five forced fumbles, a fumble recovery, and four pass deflections in 16 games and starts. Mack was ranked 19th by his fellow players on the NFL Top 100 Players of 2020. He was named to the Pro Football Hall of Fame All-Decade Team for the 2010s.

==== 2020 ====
During a Week 2 17–13 victory over the Giants, Mack recorded three tackles and his first sack of the season on Daniel Jones while also recovering a strip-sack forced by teammate Robert Quinn. Three weeks later against the Buccaneers, Mack had three tackles and sacked Tom Brady twice during the narrow 20–19 victory.

During a Week 10 19–13 loss to the Vikings, Mack recorded three tackles and his first interception of the season off a pass thrown by Kirk Cousins and returned it 33 yards. During a Week 14 36–7 victory over the Texans, Mack had two tackles and sacked Deshaun Watson in the endzone for a safety and forced a fumble on Duke Johnson that he also recovered. In the Wild Card Round against the New Orleans Saints, Mack recorded two tackles and a pass deflection in the 21–9 road loss.

On December 21, Mack was named to the Pro Bowl for the sixth consecutive season. He was ranked 23rd by his fellow players on the NFL Top 100 Players of 2021.

==== 2021 ====
Mack played in seven games during the 2021 season before undergoing season-ending foot surgery. He was placed on injured reserve on November 19. Mack finished the season with 19 tackles and six sacks in seven games and starts.

=== Los Angeles Chargers ===
==== 2022 ====
On March 16, 2022, the Bears traded Mack to the Chargers and a sixth-round pick in the 2023 NFL draft (Scott Matlock) in exchange for a second-round pick in the 2022 NFL draft (Jaquan Brisker). This move reunited him with Chargers head coach Brandon Staley, who served as the outside linebackers coach in Mack's first year with the Chicago Bears.

In his Chargers debut against his former team, the Raiders, Mack recorded three sacks and a forced fumble. The game marked his first three-plus-sack outing since Week 14 of the 2015 season, and Mack became only the fifth non-rookie to have three-plus sacks in a debut with a new team since individual sacks were first recorded in 1982. In Week 9, Mack had two tackles, a forced fumble, and a fumble recovery during a 20–17 victory over the Atlanta Falcons. He finished the 2022 season with eight sacks, 50 tackles, two passes defended, two forced fumbles, and two fumble recoveries in 17 games and starts. Mack was ranked 38th by his fellow players on the NFL Top 100 Players of 2023.

==== 2023 ====
During Week 4 against the Raiders, Mack recorded a Chargers franchise record six sacks, one shy of tying the NFL record, held by Derrick Thomas. Mack was also named AFC Defensive Player of the Week for his spectacular performance. Mack was named AFC Defensive Player of the Month for November. During Week 17 against the Broncos, he recorded his 100th career sack, becoming the 19th player (since sacks were officially recorded in 1982) to reach the mark in his first 10 seasons.

Mack finished the 2023 season with a career-high 17 sacks, 74 tackles, 10 passes defended, and five forced fumbles in 17 games and starts. He was ranked 29th by his fellow players on the NFL Top 100 Players of 2024.

==== 2024 ====
In the 2024 season, Mack had six sacks, 39 tackles, nine passes defended, two forced fumbles, and a fumble recovery in 16 games and starts. He earned Pro Bowl honors in the 2024 season. Mack was ranked 78th by his fellow players on the NFL Top 100 Players of 2025.

==== 2025 ====
On March 13, 2025, Mack signed a one-year, $16 million contract extension with the Chargers.

During Week 2 against the Las Vegas Raiders, Mack attempted to tackle Raiders receiver Tre Tucker in the first quarter, but suffered an injury after his hand was caught between Tucker and teammate Troy Dye and was ruled out for the rest of the game. On September 17, Mack was placed on injured reserve after being diagnosed with a dislocated elbow. He was activated on October 18, ahead of the Week 7 matchup against the Indianapolis Colts.

Mack finished the 2025 season with 5.5 sacks and 32 total tackles (19 solo) in 12 games and 11 starts.

==== 2026 ====
On March 7, 2026, Mack signed a one-year, $18 million contract extension with the Chargers.

== Career statistics ==
Legend
	NFL Defensive Player of the Year
**Bold**	Career high

=== NFL ===
==== Regular season ====
Year	Team	Games		Tackles						Fumbles			Interceptions					
Year	Team	GP	GS	Cmb	Solo	Ast	Sck	TFL	Sfty	FF	FR	Yds	Int	Yds	Avg	Lng	TD	PD
2014	OAK	16	16	76	59	17	4.0	16	0	1	0	0	0	0	–	0	0	3
2015	OAK	16	16	77	57	20	15.0	**23**	0	2	0	0	0	0	–	0	0	2
2016	OAK	16	16	73	54	19	11.0	14	0	5	**3**	1	**1**	6	6.0	6T	**1**	3
2017	OAK	16	16	**78**	**61**	17	10.5	15	0	1	1	0	0	0	–	0	0	3
2018	CHI	14	13	47	37	10	12.5	10	0	**6**	2	0	**1**	27	27.0	27T	**1**	4
2019	CHI	16	16	47	40	7	8.5	8	0	5	1	0	0	0	–	0	0	4
2020	CHI	16	16	50	29	**21**	9.0	11	**1**	3	2	0	**1**	**33**	**33.0**	**33**	0	3
2021	CHI	7	7	19	15	4	6.0	6	0	0	1	23	0	0	–	0	0	0
2022	LAC	17	17	50	33	17	8.0	12	0	2	2	**44**	0	0	–	0	0	2
2023	LAC	17	17	74	57	17	**17.0**	21	0	5	0	0	0	0	–	0	0	**10**
2024	LAC	16	16	39	20	19	6.0	6	0	2	1	22	0	0	–	0	0	9
2025	LAC	12	11	32	19	13	5.5	6	**1**	4	0	0	0	0	–	0	0	0
2026	LAC	9	9	24	12	12	3.0	6	0	0	0	0	0	0	–	0	0	0
Career		188	186	686	493	193	116.0	154	2	36	13	90	3	66	22.0	33	2	43

==== Postseason ====
Year	Team	Games		Tackles					Fumbles			Interceptions					
Year	Team	GP	GS	Cmb	Solo	Ast	Sck	TFL	FF	FR	Yds	Int	Yds	Avg	Lng	TD	PD
2016	OAK	1	1	**11**	**8**	**3**	0.0	**2**	0	0	0	0	0	–	0	0	0
2018	CHI	1	1	6	5	1	0.0	1	0	0	0	0	0	–	0	0	0
2020	CHI	1	1	2	1	1	0.0	1	0	0	0	0	0	–	0	0	**1**
2022	LAC	1	1	3	1	2	1.0	1	0	0	0	0	0	–	0	0	0
2024	LAC	1	1	6	4	2	**2.0**	**2**	0	0	0	0	0	–	0	0	0
2025	LAC	1	1	1	0	1	0.0	0	0	0	0	0	0	–	0	0	0
Career		6	6	29	19	10	3.0	7	0	0	0	0	0	–	0	0	1

=== College ===
Season	Team	GP	Tackles						Interceptions					Fumbles			Blk
Season	Team	GP	Solo	Ast	Cmb	TfL	Sck	Yds	Int	Yds	BU	PD	QBH	FR	Yds	FF	Kick
2009	Buffalo	0	Redshirt														
2010	Buffalo	12	40	28	68	14.5	4.5	40	0	0	**10**	0	8	1	0	2	0
2011	Buffalo	12	38	27	65	20.5	5.5	35	1	23	2	0	**13**	0	0	**5**	**1**
2012	Buffalo	11	52	42	94	**21.0**	8.0	63	0	0	2	2	4	0	0	4	**1**
2013	Buffalo	13	**56**	**44**	**100**	19.0	**10.5**	**79**	**3**	**125**	7	**10**	6	**3**	0	**5**	0
Career		48	186	141	327	75.0	28.5	217	4	148	21	12	31	4	0	16	2

== Career highlights ==
=== Awards and honors ===
NFL

- NFL Defensive Player of the Year (2016)
- 3× First-team All-Pro (2015, (Note: Selected as a defensive end and outside linebacker) 2016, 2018)
- Second-team All-Pro (2020)
- 9× Pro Bowl (2015–2020, 2022–2024)
- NFL 2010s All-Decade Team
- PFWA All-Rookie Team (2014)
- 2× Butkus Award (pro) (2016, 2018)
- SN Defensive Player of the Year (2016)
- 100 Greatest Bears of All-Time
- 100 sacks club
- 10× NFL Top 100 — 49th (2015), 13th (2017), 5th (2017), 16th (2018), 3rd (2019), 19th (2020), 23rd (2021), 38th (2023), 29th (2024), 78th (2025)

College

- MAC Defensive Player of the Year (2013)
- Jack Lambert Trophy (2013)
- First-team All-American (2013)
- 3× First-team All-MAC (2011–2013)

=== Records ===
Buffalo Bulls career records

- Most tackles for loss (75)
- Most sacks (28.5)

NCAA records

- Tied for first in tackles for loss (75)

== Personal life ==
Mack taught himself to play guitar as a freshman at the University at Buffalo. His reputation as a singer led his Raiders teammates to attempt to goad him into singing R. Kelly and Usher songs. Mack is a fan of musicians Tim McGraw and Hanson.

Mack is an active Christian and spent much of his youth attending a church where his father and mother both served as deacons.

In 2017, Mack's younger brother LeDarius joined his alma mater, the University at Buffalo, after two years at ASA College in Miami. LeDarius joined his brother on the Bears as an undrafted free agent in 2020, and was later signed to the practice squad.
