= 2018 United States embassy attack in Podgorica =

Bombing in Podgorica, Montenegro

2018 United States embassy attack
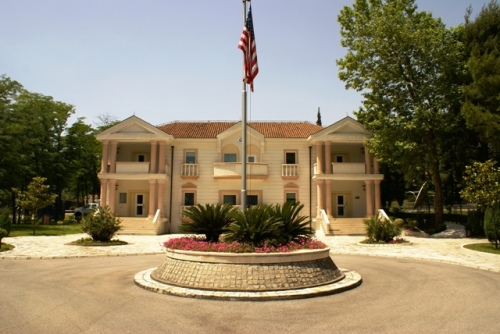
- Location: Podgorica, Montenegro
- Date: 22 February 2018; 12:30 am
- Attack type: Bombing
- Weapon: M75 hand grenade
- Deaths: 1 (perperator)
- Perpetrator: Dalibor Jauković

On 22 February 2018, a Serbian-born man threw an explosive grenade inside the embassy of the United States in Podgorica, the capital of Montenegro. He then blew himself up outside the compound with another explosive. The attack occurred around midnight when the embassy was closed, and nobody was wounded. Russian authorities denied any involvement.

== Perpetrator ==
Dalibor Jauković (Serbian Cyrillic: Даљибор Јауковић) was born in 1976 in Kraljevo, Serbia, and formerly served in the Yugoslav Army. He was a veteran of the Kosovo War. The U.S. State Department noted that Jauković was opposed to Montenegro's membership of NATO (Montenegro had joined NATO as its 29th member on June 5, 2017).

== See also ==
- Montenegrin coup plot
- Montenegro–NATO relations
