= 2019 in American football =

== 2018–19 NCAA football bowl games ==
- December 15, 2018 – January 7, 2019: 2018–19 NCAA football bowl games

=== 2018–19 College Football Playoff and Championship Game ===
- December 29, 2018: 2018 Peach Bowl in Atlanta at Mercedes-Benz Stadium
  - The Florida Gators defeated the Michigan Wolverines, with the score of 41–15.
- December 29, 2018: 2018 Orange Bowl in Miami Gardens at Hard Rock Stadium
  - The Alabama Crimson Tide defeated the Oklahoma Sooners, with the score of 45–34.
- December 29, 2018: 2018 Cotton Bowl Classic in Arlington at AT&T Stadium
  - The Clemson Tigers defeated the Notre Dame Fighting Irish, with the score of 30–3.
- January 1: 2019 Fiesta Bowl in Glendale at University of Phoenix Stadium
  - The LSU Tigers defeated the UCF Knights, with the score of 40–32.
- January 1: 2019 Rose Bowl in Pasadena at Rose Bowl
  - The Ohio State Buckeyes defeated the Washington Huskies, with the score of 28–23.
- January 1: 2019 Sugar Bowl in New Orleans at Mercedes-Benz Superdome
  - The Texas Longhorns defeated the Georgia Bulldogs, with the score of 28–21.
- January 7: 2019 College Football Playoff National Championship in Santa Clara at Levi's Stadium
  - The Clemson Tigers defeated the Alabama Crimson Tide, 44–16, to win their third College Football Playoff National Championship title.

=== 2018–19 Non-CFP bowl games ===
- December 15, 2018: 2018 New Mexico Bowl in Albuquerque at Dreamstyle Stadium
  - The Utah State Aggies defeated the North Texas Mean Green, with the score of 52–13.
- December 15, 2018: 2018 Cure Bowl in Orlando at Camping World Stadium
  - The Tulane Green Wave defeated the Louisiana Ragin' Cajuns, with the score of 41–24.
- December 15, 2018: 2018 Las Vegas Bowl in Las Vegas at Sam Boyd Stadium
  - The Fresno State Bulldogs defeated the Arizona State Sun Devils, with the score of 31–20.
- December 15, 2018: 2018 Camellia Bowl in Montgomery at Cramton Bowl
  - The Georgia Southern Eagles defeated the Eastern Michigan Eagles, with the score of 23–21.
- December 15, 2018: 2018 New Orleans Bowl in New Orleans at Mercedes-Benz Superdome
  - The Appalachian State Mountaineers defeated the Middle Tennessee Blue Raiders, with the score of 45–13.
- December 18, 2018: 2018 Boca Raton Bowl in Boca Raton at FAU Stadium
  - The UAB Blazers defeated the Northern Illinois Huskies, with the score of 37–13.
- December 19, 2018: 2018 Frisco Bowl in Frisco at Toyota Stadium
  - The Ohio Bobcats defeated the San Diego State Aztecs, with the score of 27–0.
- December 20, 2018: 2018 Gasparilla Bowl in Tampa at Raymond James Stadium
  - The Marshall Thundering Herd defeated the South Florida Bulls, with the score of 38–20.
- December 21, 2018: 2018 Bahamas Bowl in Nassau at Thomas Robinson Stadium
  - The FIU Panthers defeated the Toledo Rockets, with the score of 35–32.
- December 21, 2018: 2018 Famous Idaho Potato Bowl in Boise at Albertsons Stadium
  - The BYU Cougars defeated the Western Michigan Broncos, with the score of 49–18.
- December 22, 2018: 2018 Birmingham Bowl in Birmingham at Legion Field
  - The Wake Forest Demon Deacons defeated the Memphis Tigers, with the score of 37–34.
- December 22, 2018: 2018 Armed Forces Bowl in Fort Worth at Amon G. Carter Stadium
  - The Army Black Knights defeated the Houston Cougars, 70–14, with the Black Knights tying records for most points scored and largest victory margin in any bowl game.
- December 22, 2018: 2018 Dollar General Bowl in Mobile at Ladd–Peebles Stadium
  - The Troy Trojans defeated the Buffalo Bulls, with the score of 42–32.
- December 22, 2018: 2018 Hawaii Bowl in Honolulu at Aloha Stadium
  - The Louisiana Tech Bulldogs defeated the Hawaii Rainbow Warriors, with the score of 31–14.
- December 26, 2018: 2018 First Responder Bowl in Dallas at Cotton Bowl
  - No contest between the Boston College Eagles and the Boise State Broncos, due to unfavorable weather conditions.
- December 26, 2018: 2018 Quick Lane Bowl in Detroit at Ford Field
  - The Minnesota Golden Gophers defeated the Georgia Tech Yellow Jackets, with the score of 34–10.
- December 26, 2018: 2018 Cheez-It Bowl in Phoenix at Chase Field
  - The TCU Horned Frogs defeated the California Golden Bears, with the score of 10–7 in overtime.
- December 27, 2018: 2018 Independence Bowl in Shreveport at Independence Stadium
  - The Duke Blue Devils defeated the Temple Owls, with the score of 56–27.
- December 27, 2018: 2018 Pinstripe Bowl in The Bronx at Yankee Stadium
  - The Wisconsin Badgers defeated the Miami Hurricanes, with the score of 35–3.
- December 27, 2018: 2018 Texas Bowl in Houston at NRG Stadium
  - The Baylor Bears defeated the Vanderbilt Commodores, with the score of 45–38.
- December 28, 2018: 2018 Music City Bowl in Nashville at Nissan Stadium
  - The Auburn Tigers defeated the Purdue Boilermakers, with the score of 63–14.
- December 28, 2018: 2018 Camping World Bowl in Orlando at Camping World Stadium
  - The Syracuse Orange defeated the West Virginia Mountaineers, with the score of 34–18.
- December 28, 2018: 2018 Alamo Bowl in San Antonio at Alamodome
  - The Washington State Cougars defeated the Iowa State Cyclones, with the score of 28–26.
- December 29, 2018: 2018 Belk Bowl in Charlotte at Bank of America Stadium
  - The Virginia Cavaliers defeated the South Carolina Gamecocks, with the score of 28–0.
- December 29, 2018: 2018 Arizona Bowl in Tucson at Arizona Stadium
  - The Nevada Wolf Pack defeated the Arkansas State Red Wolves, with the score of 16–13.
- December 31, 2018: 2018 Redbox Bowl in Santa Clara at Levi's Stadium
  - The Oregon Ducks defeated the Michigan State Spartans, with the score of 7–6.
- December 31, 2018: 2018 Holiday Bowl in San Diego at SDCCU Stadium
  - The Northwestern Wildcats defeated the Utah Utes, with the score of 31–20.
- December 31, 2018: 2018 Military Bowl in Annapolis at Navy–Marine Corps Memorial Stadium
  - The Cincinnati Bearcats defeated the Virginia Tech Hokies, with the score of 35–31.
- December 31, 2018: 2018 Sun Bowl in El Paso at Sun Bowl
  - The Stanford Cardinal defeated the Pittsburgh Panthers, with the score of 14–13.
- December 31, 2018: 2018 Liberty Bowl in Memphis at Liberty Bowl Memorial Stadium
  - The Oklahoma State Cowboys defeated the Missouri Tigers, with the score of 38–33.
- December 31, 2018: 2018 Gator Bowl in Jacksonville at TIAA Bank Field
  - The Texas A&M Aggies defeated the NC State Wolfpack, with the score of 52–13.
- January 1, 2019: 2019 Outback Bowl in Tampa at Raymond James Stadium
  - The Iowa Hawkeyes defeated the Mississippi State Bulldogs, with the score of 27–22.
- January 1, 2019: 2019 Citrus Bowl in Orlando at Camping World Stadium
  - The Kentucky Wildcats defeated the Penn State Nittany Lions, with the score of 27–24.

== National Football League ==
- January 27: 2019 Pro Bowl in Orlando at Camping World Stadium
  - Team AFC defeated team NFC, with the score of 26–7.
  - Offensive MVP: Patrick Mahomes (Kansas City Chiefs)
  - Defensive MVP: Jamal Adams (New York Jets)
- February 3: Super Bowl LIII in Atlanta at Mercedes-Benz Stadium
  - The New England Patriots defeated the Los Angeles Rams, 13–3, to win their sixth Super Bowl title.
  - MVP: Julian Edelman (New England Patriots)
- April 25–27: 2019 NFL draft in Nashville
  - #1 pick: Kyler Murray (to the Arizona Cardinals from the Oklahoma Sooners)
- September 5 – December 29: 2019 NFL season

== IFAF ==
- July 29 – August 4: 2019 IFAF European U-19 American Football Championships in Bologna
  - Austria defeated Sweden, 28–0, in the final. France took third place.
- August 11–18: 2019 IFAF Women's European American Football Championships in Leeds
  - United Kingdom defeated Finland, 18–14, in the final. Sweden took third place.
- August 29 – September 1: 2019 IFAF European Flag Championships in Jerusalem
  - Winners: Denmark (m) / Spain (f)

== Other notable events ==
- February 9: Alliance of American Football launches and disbands (2019 AAF season)
- November 27: Arena Football League disbands (2019 Arena Football League season)

== Deaths ==
- January 2
  - Jerry Magee, sportswriter (b. 1928)
  - Jim Margraff, coach (b. 1960)
  - George Welsh, coach (b. 1933)
- January 3 – William Miller, player (b. 1956)
- January 5 – Pete Manning, player (b. 1937)
- January 6
  - Roy Hilton, player (b. 1943)
  - Kwamie Lassiter, player (b. 1969)
- January 10
  - Rick Forzano, coach (b. 1928)
  - John Michels, player and coach (b. 1931)
- January 12 – Bob Kuechenberg, player (b. 1947)
- January 15 – Tim Maypray, player (b. 1988)
- January 16 – Hank Norton, coach (b. 1927)
- January 17
  - Joe O'Donnell, player (b. 1941)
  - Turk Schonert, player (b. 1956)
- January 18
  - Dan Orlich, player (b. 1924)
  - William A. Thomas, player and coach (b. 1948)
- January 22 – Bill Mackrides, player (b. 1925)
- January 26 – Duane Benson, player (b. 1945)
- February 1
  - Glen Ray Hines, player (b. 1943)
  - Wade Wilson, player and coach (b. 1958)
- February 8 – Dick Kempthorn, player (b. 1926)
- February 11 – Lou Sossamon, player (b. 1921)
- February 16 – Shelly Saltman, 1982 NFL Players Association promoter (b. 1931)
- February 18 – T. J. Cunningham, player (b. 1972)
- February 25 – Fred Gloden, player (b. 1918)
- March 2 – Jack Gregory, player (b. 1944)
- March 7 – Dan Jenkins, sportswriter (b. 1928)
- March 8 – Cedrick Hardman, player (b. 1948)
- March 9 – Joe Auer, player (b. 1941)
- March 10
  - Russell Gary, player (b. 1959)
  - Eric Moss, player (b. 1974)
- March 21 – Anthony Dickerson, player (b. 1957)
- March 23 – Clem Daniels, player (b. 1937)
- March 27 – Joe Bellino, player (b. 1938)
- April 8 – Blase Bonpane, player (b. 1929)
- April 17 – Chet Coppock, broadcast journalist and sports talk personality (b. 1948)
- April 20 – Reggie Cobb, player (b. 1968)
- April 24 – Johnny Green, player (b. 1937)
- April 29 – Gino Marchetti, player (b. 1925)
- May 2 – Larry Dick, 64, player.
- May 3
  - Bill Gompers, 91, player
  - Bob Zeman, 82, player and coach
- May 4 – MacArthur Lane, 77, player
- May 6 – Jimmy Satterfield, coach (b. 1939)
- May 10 – Dick Tomey, coach (b. 1938)
- May 16 – Bob Schloredt, player and coach (b. 1939)
- May 18 – John Payne, coach (b. 1932)
- May 19 – George Chaump, player and coach (b. 1935)
- May 23 – Bill Yoast, high school coach (T. C. Williams High School), depicted in Remember the Titans (b. 1924)
- May 25 – Rod Bramblett, sportscaster (b. 1965)
- May 26 – Bart Starr, player and coach (b. 1934)
- May 28 – Horace Belton, player (b. 1955)
- June 8 – Eric Patterson, player (b. 1993)
- June 13 – Pat Bowlen, team owner (b. 1944)
- June 23 – Jack Rudolph, player (b. 1938)
- June 25 – Ken Behring, team owner (b. 1928)
- July 3 – Jared Lorenzen, player (b. 1981)
- July 4 – Wayne Mass, player (b. 1946)
- July 7 – Bob Fouts, sportscaster (b. 1921)
- July 10 – Walt Michaels, player and coach (b. 1929)
- July 14 – Mike Maser, coach (b. 1947)
- July 16 – Adam Bob, player (b. 1967)
- July 18 – Mitch Petrus, player (b. 1987)
- July 19 – Bert Rechichar, player (b. 1930)
- July 27 – Keith Lincoln, player (b. 1939)
- July 29 – Max Falkenstien, sportscaster (b. 1924)
- July 30 – Nick Buoniconti, player (b. 1940)
- August 1 – Jack Dolbin, player (b. 1948)
- August 3 – Cliff Branch, player (b. 1948)
- August 8 – Dave Parks, player (b. 1941)
- August 11 – Darryl Drake, player and coach (b. 1956)
- August 16
  - Jim Hardy, player (b. 1923)
  - Mike McGee, player, coach and athletic director (b. 1938)
- August 17 – Cedric Benson, player (b. 1982)
- August 18 – Jack Whitaker, sportscaster (b. 1924)
- August 19 – Barry Bennett, player (b. 1955)
- August 22 – Bobby Dillon, player (b. 1930)
- August 24 – Dick Woodard, player (b. 1926)
- August 28 – Donnie Green, player (b. 1948)
- August 29 – Jim Langer, player (b. 1948)
- August 31 – Jeff Blackshear, player (b. 1969)
- September 7 – Al Carmichael, player (b. 1928)
- September 9 – Neiron Ball, player (b. 1992)
- September 10
  - Sam Davis, player (b. 1944)
  - Billy Stacy, player (b. 1936)
- September 11
  - Terrell Roberts, player (b. 1981)
  - Joe Scudero, player (b. 1930)
- September 14
  - Larry Garron, player (b. 1937)
  - John Ralston, coach (b. 1927)
- September 20
  - Howard Cassady, player (b. 1934)
  - Jan Merlin, actor (b. 1925)
- September 21
  - Tommy Brooker, player (b. 1939)
  - E. J. Holub, player (b. 1938)
  - Jevan Snead, player (b. 1987)
- September 22 – Wally Chambers, player (b. 1951)
- October 1 – Ed Simonini, player (b. 1954)
- October 2 – Bill Bidwill, team owner (b. 1931)
- October 8 – Chip Healy, player (b. 1947)
- October 18 – Mike Reilly, player (b. 1942)
- October 21 – Willie Brown, player (b. 1940)
- October 22 – George Brancato, player and coach (b. 1931)
- October 23 – Bernie Parrish, player (b. 1936)
- October 29 – Charlie Taaffe, coach (b. 1950)
- October 30 – Sam Jankovich, coach and athletic director (b. 1934)
- November 4
  - Jim LeClair, player (b. 1950)
  - Virginia Leith, actress (b. 1925)
- November 7 – Dan McGrew, player (b. 1937)
- November 9 – Yusuf Scott, player (b. 1976)
- November 11
  - Zeke Bratkowski, player (b. 1931)
  - Charles Rogers, player (b. 1981)
- November 20 – Fred Cox, player (b. 1938)
- November 22 – Warren Wolf, coach (b. 1927)
- November 24 – Hank Bullough, player and coach (b. 1934)
- November 28 – John McKissick, coach (b. 1926)
- November 29
  - Seymour Siwoff, sports statistician and businessman (b. 1920)
  - R-Kal Truluck, player (b. 1974)
- December 1 – Paul Sullivan, player and coach (b. 1950)
- December 2 – George Atkinson III, player (b. 1992)
- December 4 – Cas Banaszek, player (b. 1945)
- December 5 – Sherman Howard, player (b. 1924)
- December 7 – Bump Elliott, player, coach, and athletic director (b. 1925)
- December 9
  - Leon Hardeman, player (b. 1932)
  - Chuck Heberling, sports administrator and referee (b. 1925)
- December 12 – Vaughan Johnson, player (b. 1962)
- December 17 – Hayden Fry, player and coach (b. 1929)
- December 18 – Herman Boone, coach (b. 1935)
- December 24 – Rusty Hilger, player (b. 1962)
- December 26 – Elbert Dubenion, player (b. 1933)
- December 28 – Carley Ann McCord, sports journalist (b. 1989)
