= Mark Ivey =

American football player and coach (born 1973)

Current position
- Title: Defensive coordinator
- Team: Louisville
- Conference: ACC

Biographical details
- Born: July 11, 1973 (age 53); Collinsville, Virginia U.S.

Playing career
- 1991–1995: Appalachian State
- Positions: Linebacker, Defensive lineman

Coaching career (HC unless noted)
- 1996: Port Charlotte HS (FL) (OL/DL)
- 1997: Cape Coral HS (FL) (assistant)
- 1998–2001: Gulf Coast HS (FL) (DC/OL)
- 2002–2006: Cypress Lake HS (FL)
- 2007–2011: Barron G. Collier HS (FL)
- 2012–2013: Appalachian State (ST/OLB)
- 2014–2017: Appalachian State (DL)
- 2018: Appalachian State (AHC/DL)
- 2018: Appalachian State (interim HC)
- 2019–2022: Louisville (DL)
- 2023–2025: Louisville (LB)
- 2026–present: Louisville (co-DC/DL)

Head coaching record
- Overall: 1–0 (college)
- Bowls: 1–0

Mark Ivey (born July 11, 1973) is an American college football coach who is the co-defensive coordinator at the University of Louisville. A longtime high school football coach in Florida, he joined the college coaching ranks at his alma mater, Appalachian State, in 2012, serving as their interim head coach in 2018 when Scott Satterfield departed to be the head coach at Louisville. He followed Satterfield to Louisville in 2019 to serve as his defensive line coach.

== Coaching career ==
=== High school coaching ===
After graduating from Appalachian State in 1996, Ivey coached the freshman offensive and defensive line at Port Charlotte High School in Florida. He spent the 1997 season at Cape Coral High School as an assistant, before going on to coach the offensive line and serve as the defensive coordinator at Gulf Coast High School. He was also the head coach at Cypress Lake High School and Barron G. Collier High School from 2002 to 2006 and 2007 to 2011, respectively. At Barron Collier, he compiled a 36–19 record, led them to state playoff appearances all five years of his tenure, and won three consecutive district championships from 2007 to 2009.

=== Appalachian State ===
Ivey was named the outside linebackers coach and special teams coordinator at his alma mater Appalachian State in 2012, working under former teammate Scott Satterfield. He was reassigned to defensive line coach in 2014 and later added the title of assistant head coach in 2018.

Ivey was named the interim head coach in 2018 after Satterfield departed to take the head coaching job at the University of Louisville. He coached the team in their bowl game against Middle Tennessee, where the Mountaineers won by a score of 45–13. His interim tag was not removed at the end of the season, and Eliah Drinkwitz was hired to be the new head coach.

=== Louisville ===
Ivey was officially named the defensive line coach at Louisville in 2019, joining Satterfield once again. In 2023, Ivey elected to remain with Louisville under new coach Jeff Brohm as linebackers coach.

== Head coaching record ==
=== College ===
Year	Team	Overall	Conference	Standing	Bowl/playoffs
Appalachian State Mountaineers (Sun Belt Conference) (2018)
2018	Appalachian State	1–0 ‡			W New Orleans
Appalachian State:		1–0		‡ Served as interim HC for bowl game	
Total:		1–0			
