= 2018 Florida Atlantic Owls football team =

American college football season

2018 Florida Atlantic Owls football
- Conference: Conference USA
- East Division
- Record: 5–7 (3–5 C-USA)
- Head coach: Lane Kiffin (2nd season)
- Offensive coordinator: Charlie Weis Jr. (1st season)
- Offensive scheme: Veer and shoot
- Defensive coordinator: Tony Pecoraro (1st season)
- Base defense: Multiple
- Home stadium: FAU Stadium

2018 Conference USA football standings
	Conf.			Overall
Team	W		L	W		L
East Division
Middle Tennessee x	7	–	1	8	–	6
FIU	6	–	2	9	–	4
Marshall	6	–	2	9	–	4
Charlotte	4	–	4	5	–	7
Florida Atlantic	3	–	5	5	–	7
Old Dominion	2	–	6	4	–	8
Western Kentucky	2	–	6	3	–	9
West Division
UAB x$	7	–	1	11	–	3
North Texas	5	–	3	9	–	4
Louisiana Tech	5	–	3	8	–	5
Southern Miss	5	–	3	6	–	5
UTSA	2	–	6	3	–	9
UTEP	1	–	7	1	–	11
Rice	1	–	7	2	–	11
Championship: UAB 27, Middle Tennessee 25
$ – Conference champion; x – Division champion/co-champions

The 2018 Florida Atlantic Owls football team represented Florida Atlantic University in the 2018 NCAA Division I FBS football season. The Owls played their home games at the FAU Stadium in Boca Raton, Florida, and competed in the East Division of Conference USA (C–USA). They were led by second-year head coach Lane Kiffin. They finished the season 5–7, 3–5 in C-USA play to finish in fifth place in the East Division.

== Preseason ==
=== Award watch lists ===
Listed in the order that they were released

Award	Player	Position	Year
Chuck Bednarik Award	Azeez Al-Shaair	LB	SR
Maxwell Award	Devin Singletary	RB	JR
Doak Walker Award	Devin Singletary	RB	JR
John Mackey Award	Harrison Bryant	TE	JR
Butkus Award	Azeez Al-Shaair	LB	SR
Jim Thorpe Award	Shelton Lewis	CB	SR
Jim Thorpe Award	Jalen Young	S	SR
Bronko Nagurski Trophy	Azeez Al-Shaair	LB	SR
Bronko Nagurski Trophy	Shelton Lewis	CB	SR
Wuerffel Trophy	Gerald Hearns	RB	SR
Walter Camp Award	Devin Singletary	RB	JR
Ted Hendricks Award	Hunter Snyder	DE	SR
Earl Campbell Tyler Rose Award	DeAndre McNeal	WR	SR

=== C-USA preseason awards ===
On July 16, 2018, Conference USA released their preseason awards, including the preseason all-CUSA team. Running back Devin Singletary was selected as the preseason offensive player of the year and linebacker Azeez Al-Shaair was selected as the preseason defensive player of the year. The Owls placed a total of six players of the all-CUSA team.

Offense

Devin Singletary – RB/offensive player of the year

Reggie Bain – OL

Harrison Bryant – TE

Defense

Azeez Al-Shaair – LB/defensive player of the year

Shelton Lewis – DB

Jalen Young – DB

=== Preseason media poll ===
Conference USA released their preseason media poll on July 17, 2018, with the Owls predicted to be champions of the East Division.

== Schedule ==
Date	Time	Opponent	Site	TV	Result	Attendance
September 1	12:00 p.m.	at No. 7 Oklahoma*	Gaylord Family Oklahoma Memorial Stadium; Norman, OK	FOX	L 14–63	86,402
September 8	2:00 p.m.	Air Force*	FAU Stadium; Boca Raton, FL	CBSSN	W 33–27	24,101
September 15	6:00 p.m.	Bethune–Cookman*	FAU Stadium; Boca Raton, FL	Stadium	W 49–28	19,017
September 21	7:00 p.m.	at No. 16 UCF*	Spectrum Stadium; Orlando, FL	ESPN	L 36–56	44,257
September 29	7:00 p.m.	at Middle Tennessee	Johnny "Red" Floyd Stadium; Murfreesboro, TN	Stadium	L 24–25	17,299
October 6	5:00 p.m.	Old Dominion	FAU Stadium; Boca Raton, FL	Stadium	W 52–33	18,205
October 20	2:30 p.m.	at Marshall	Joan C. Edwards Stadium; Huntington, WV	CBSSN	L 7–31	23,825
October 26	6:30 p.m.	Louisiana Tech	FAU Stadium; Boca Raton, FL	CBSSN	L 13–21	14,948
November 3	7:30 p.m.	at FIU	Riccardo Silva Stadium; Miami, FL (Shula Bowl)	Stadium	W 49–14	18,478
November 10	5:00 p.m.	Western Kentucky	FAU Stadium; Boca Raton, FL	Stadium	W 34–15	14,400
November 15	9:30 p.m.	at North Texas	Apogee Stadium; Denton, TX	CBSSN	L 38–41	18,338
November 24	6:00 p.m.	Charlotte	FAU Stadium; Boca Raton, FL	Stadium	L 24–27	11,638
*Non-conference game; Rankings from AP Poll released prior to the game; All times are in Eastern time

Schedule source:

== Game summaries ==
=== At Oklahoma ===
	1	2	3	4	Total
Owls	0	0	7	7	14
No. 7 Sooners	28	14	14	7	63

=== Air Force ===
	1	2	3	4	Total
Falcons	0	7	13	7	27
Owls	6	13	6	8	33

=== Bethune–Cookman ===
	1	2	3	4	Total
Wildcats	0	14	7	7	28
Owls	29	7	7	6	49

=== At UCF ===
	1	2	3	4	Total
Owls	7	10	6	13	36
No. 16 Knights	14	7	21	14	56

=== At Middle Tennessee ===
	1	2	3	4	Total
Owls	14	7	3	0	24
Blue Raiders	0	10	7	8	25

=== Old Dominion ===
	1	2	3	4	Total
Monarchs	0	7	14	12	33
Owls	6	20	6	20	52

=== At Marshall ===
	1	2	3	4	Total
Owls	0	7	0	0	7
Thundering Herd	0	10	14	7	31

=== Louisiana Tech ===
	1	2	3	4	Total
Bulldogs	0	14	0	7	21
Owls	10	0	3	0	13

=== At FIU ===
	1	2	3	4	Total
Owls	7	7	7	28	49
Panthers	0	7	7	0	14

=== Western Kentucky ===
	1	2	3	4	Total
Hilltoppers	0	9	0	6	15
Owls	10	0	7	17	34

=== At North Texas ===
	1	2	3	4	Total
Owls	7	0	0	0	7
Mean Green	17	3	0	0	20

=== Charlotte ===
	1	2	3	4	Total
49ers	10	0	7	10	27
Owls	7	14	0	3	24

== Players drafted into the NFL ==
Round	Pick	Player	Position	NFL Club
3	74	Devin Singletary	RB	Buffalo Bills
7	222	Kerrith Whyte	RB	Chicago Bears
