= 2018 UTEP Miners football team =

American college football season

2018 UTEP Miners football
- Conference: Conference USA
- West Division
- Record: 1–11 (1–7 C-USA)
- Head coach: Dana Dimel (1st season)
- Offensive coordinator: Mike Canales (1st season)
- Offensive scheme: Pro-style
- Defensive coordinator: Mike Cox (1st season)
- Base defense: 4–3
- Home stadium: Sun Bowl Stadium

2018 Conference USA football standings
	Conf.			Overall
Team	W		L	W		L
East Division
Middle Tennessee x	7	–	1	8	–	6
FIU	6	–	2	9	–	4
Marshall	6	–	2	9	–	4
Charlotte	4	–	4	5	–	7
Florida Atlantic	3	–	5	5	–	7
Old Dominion	2	–	6	4	–	8
Western Kentucky	2	–	6	3	–	9
West Division
UAB x$	7	–	1	11	–	3
North Texas	5	–	3	9	–	4
Louisiana Tech	5	–	3	8	–	5
Southern Miss	5	–	3	6	–	5
UTSA	2	–	6	3	–	9
UTEP	1	–	7	1	–	11
Rice	1	–	7	2	–	11
Championship: UAB 27, Middle Tennessee 25
$ – Conference champion; x – Division champion/co-champions

The 2018 UTEP Miners football team represented the University of Texas at El Paso (UTEP) as a member of the West Division in Conference USA (C-USA) during the 2018 NCAA Division I FCS football season. Led by first-year head coach Dana Dimel, the Miners compiled an overall record of 1–11 with a mark of 1–7 in conference play, tying for sixth place at the bottom of the standings in C-USA's West Division. The team played home games at the Sun Bowl in El Paso, Texas.

UTEP averaged 14,155 fans per game.

== Schedule ==
Date	Time	Opponent	Site	TV	Result	Attendance
September 1	5:30 p.m.	Northern Arizona*	Sun Bowl; El Paso, TX	ESPN3	L 10–30	17,271
September 8	7:00 p.m.	at UNLV*	Sam Boyd Stadium; Whitney, NV	ATTSN	L 24–52	14,122
September 15	10:00 a.m.	at Tennessee*	Neyland Stadium; Knoxville, TN	SECN	L 0–24	87,074
September 22	5:30 p.m.	New Mexico State*	Sun Bowl; El Paso, TX (Battle of I-10)	ESPN3	L 20–27	19,412
September 29	5:00 p.m.	at UTSA	Alamodome; San Antonio, TX	ESPN+	L 21–30	36,582
October 6	5:30 p.m.	North Texas^{†}	Sun Bowl; El Paso, TX	beIN	L 24–27	12,809
October 20	1:30 p.m.	at Louisiana Tech	Joe Aillet Stadium; Ruston, LA	ESPN+	L 24–31	18,972
October 27	5:30 p.m.	UAB	Sun Bowl; El Paso, TX	ESPN+	L 0–19	10,787
November 3	1:30 p.m.	at Rice	Rice Stadium; Houston, TX	ESPN3	W 34–26	18,420
November 10	1:00 p.m.	Middle Tennessee	Sun Bowl; El Paso, TX	ESPN+	L 32–48	9,690
November 17	5:30 p.m.	at Western Kentucky	Houchens Industries–L. T. Smith Stadium; Bowling Green, KY	beIN	L 16–40	6,221
November 24	1:00 p.m.	Southern Miss	Sun Bowl; El Paso, TX	ESPN+	L 7–39	14,962
*Non-conference game; ^{†}Homecoming; All times are in Mountain time

== Preseason ==
=== Award watch lists ===
Listed in the order that they were released

Award	Player	Position	Year
Rimington Trophy	Derron Gatewood	C	SR
Wuerffel Trophy	Kalaii Griffin	LB	SR

=== Preseason media poll ===
Conference USA released its preseason media poll on July 17, 2018, with the Miners predicted to finish in a tie for sixth place in the West Division.

=== Spring Game ===
The 2018 Spring Game took place in El Paso, on April 13, at 7 p.m.

Date	Time	Spring Game	Site	TV	Result	Attendance
April 13	7:00 p.m.	Orange vs. Blue	Sun Bowl • El Paso, Texas	CUSA.tv	Orange 20–13	-

== Game summaries ==
=== Northern Arizona ===
	1	2	3	4	Total
Lumberjacks	10	7	13	0	30
Miners	0	10	0	0	10

=== At UNLV ===
	1	2	3	4	Total
Miners	10	0	7	7	24
Rebels	14	24	7	7	52

=== At Tennessee ===
	1	2	3	4	Total
Miners	0	0	0	0	0
Volunteers	3	7	7	7	24

=== New Mexico State ===
	1	2	3	4	Total
Aggies	10	7	7	3	27
Miners	7	3	7	3	20

=== At UTSA ===
	1	2	3	4	Total
Miners	7	0	7	7	21
Roadrunners	7	17	0	6	30

=== North Texas ===
	1	2	3	4	Total
Mean Green	7	3	10	7	27
Miners	3	7	0	14	24

=== At Louisiana Tech ===
	1	2	3	4	Total
Miners	7	0	14	3	24
Bulldogs	14	3	7	7	31

=== UAB ===
	1	2	3	4	Total
Blazers	10	0	2	7	19
Miners	0	0	0	0	0

=== At Rice ===
	1	2	3	4	Total
Miners	7	20	7	0	34
Owls	0	3	7	16	26

=== Middle Tennessee ===
	1	2	3	4	Total
Blue Raiders	14	13	7	14	48
Miners	0	10	0	22	32

=== At Western Kentucky ===
	1	2	3	4	Total
Miners	0	0	8	8	16
Hilltoppers	27	13	0	0	40

=== Southern Miss ===
	1	2	3	4	Total
Golden Eagles	16	3	7	13	39
Miners	0	0	0	7	7

== Coaching staff ==
Name	Position	Year at UTEP	Alma mater (Year)
Dana Dimel	Head Coach	1st	Kansas State (1986)
Mike Canales	Offensive coordinator/quarterbacks	1st	Utah State (1984)
Mike Cox	Defensive coordinator/linebackers	1st	Idaho (1989)
Joe Robinson	Special teams coordinator	1st	LSU (1985)
Mike Simmonds	Offensive line	1st	Indiana State (1987)
Mike Tuiasosopo	Defensive line/defensive Tackle	1st	Pacific Lutheran (1989)
Keith Burns	Secondary/safeties	1st	Arkansas (1982)
Reggie Mitchell	Running backs	1st	Central Michigan (1984)
Scotty Ohara	Wide receivers	1st	Arizona (2008)
Jake Waters	Inside Wide receivers	1st	Kansas State (2014)
Remington Rebstock	Cornerbacks	1st	Kansas State
Matt Rahl	Director of recruiting	1st	Missouri Southern State (2003)
Barrick Nealy	Director of Player Development	1st	Texas State (2017)
Josh Oglesby	Offensive Quality Control	1st	Wisconsin (2011)
Kevin Schadt	Director of Strength and Conditioning	1st	Delaware (2007)
Nate Poss	Assistant Athletic Director for Football Operations		
Jacob Martinez	Graduate Assistant Football Operations	2nd	UTEP (2016)
