= 2018 Rice Owls football team =

American college football season

2018 Rice Owls football
- Conference: Conference USA
- West Division
- Record: 2–11 (1–7 C-USA)
- Head coach: Mike Bloomgren (1st season)
- Offensive coordinator: Jerry Mack (1st season)
- Offensive scheme: Multiple
- Defensive coordinator: Brian Smith (1st season)
- Base defense: Multiple 3–4
- Home stadium: Rice Stadium

2018 Conference USA football standings
	Conf.			Overall
Team	W		L	W		L
East Division
Middle Tennessee x	7	–	1	8	–	6
FIU	6	–	2	9	–	4
Marshall	6	–	2	9	–	4
Charlotte	4	–	4	5	–	7
Florida Atlantic	3	–	5	5	–	7
Old Dominion	2	–	6	4	–	8
Western Kentucky	2	–	6	3	–	9
West Division
UAB x$	7	–	1	11	–	3
North Texas	5	–	3	9	–	4
Louisiana Tech	5	–	3	8	–	5
Southern Miss	5	–	3	6	–	5
UTSA	2	–	6	3	–	9
UTEP	1	–	7	1	–	11
Rice	1	–	7	2	–	11
Championship: UAB 27, Middle Tennessee 25
$ – Conference champion; x – Division champion/co-champions

The 2018 Rice Owls football team represented Rice University in the 2018 NCAA Division I FBS football season. The Owls played their home games at the Rice Stadium in Houston, Texas, and competed in the West Division of Conference USA (C–USA). They were led by first-year head coach Mike Bloomgren. They finished the season 2–11, 1–7 in C-USA play to finish in a tie for sixth place in the West Division.

== Preseason ==
=== Preseason All-CUSA team ===
Conference USA released their preseason all-CUSA team on July 16, 2018, with the Owls having one player selected.

Special teams

Jack Fox – P

=== Preseason media poll ===
Conference USA released their preseason media poll on July 17, 2018, with the Owls predicted to finish in a tie for sixth place in the West Division.

== Schedule ==
Date	Time	Opponent	Site	TV	Result	Attendance
August 25	6:00 p.m.	Prairie View A&M*	Rice Stadium; Houston, TX	ESPN+	W 31–28	20,050
September 1	11:00 a.m.	Houston*	Rice Stadium; Houston, TX (rivalry)	CBSSN	L 27–45	26,390
September 8	11:00 p.m.	at Hawaii*	Aloha Stadium; Honolulu, HI	Stadium	L 29–43	23,112
September 22	6:00 p.m.	at Southern Miss	M. M. Roberts Stadium; Hattiesburg, MS	ESPN+	L 22–40	20,159
September 29	2:30 p.m.	at Wake Forest*	BB&T Field; Winston-Salem, NC	ACCRSN	L 24–56	24,519
October 6	6:00 p.m.	UTSA	Rice Stadium; Houston, TX	ESPN3	L 3–20	19,170
October 13	12:00 p.m.	UAB	Rice Stadium; Houston, TX	ESPN+	L 0–42	18,916
October 20	6:30 p.m.	at FIU	Riccardo Silva Stadium; Miami, FL	ESPN+	L 17–36	13,741
October 27	3:00 p.m.	at North Texas	Apogee Stadium; Denton, TX	ESPN+	L 17–41	25,375
November 3	2:30 p.m.	UTEP	Rice Stadium; Houston, TX	ESPN3	L 26–34	18,420
November 10	6:00 p.m.	at Louisiana Tech	Joe Aillet Stadium; Ruston, LA	ESPN+	L 13–28	15,283
November 17	6:30 p.m.	at No. 10 LSU*	Tiger Stadium; Baton Rouge, LA	ESPNU	L 10–42	100,323
November 24	12:00 p.m.	Old Dominion	Rice Stadium; Houston, TX	ESPN+	W 27–13	18,083
*Non-conference game; Rankings from AP Poll released prior to the game; All times are in Central time

Schedule source:

== Game summaries ==
=== Prairie View A&M ===
	1	2	3	4	Total
Panthers	0	21	7	0	28
Owls	13	6	0	12	31

Scoring summary

Quarter	Time	Drive			Team	Scoring information	Score	
Quarter	Time	Plays	Yards	TOP	Team	Scoring information	PVAM	Rice
1	4:29	14	86	7:52	Rice	Austin Walker 10-yard touchdown run, Jack Fox kick good	0	7
1	1:53	3	44	0:57	Rice	Emmanuel Esukpa 15-yard touchdown run, Jack Fox kick failed	0	13
2	11:03	9	60	4:09	Rice	33-yard field goal by Jack Fox	0	16
2	9:06	6	75	1:57	PVAM	Zarrian Holcomb 20-yard touchdown reception from Jalen Morton, Zach Elder kick good	7	16
2	4:17	10	47	4:49	Rice	36-yard field goal by Haden Tobola	7	19
2	1:33	7	69	2:44	PVAM	Jose Medrano 2-yard touchdown reception from Jalen Morton, Zach Elder kick good	14	19
2	0:06	4	69	0:34	PVAM	Tristen Wallace 20-yard touchdown reception from Jalen Morton, Zach Elder kick good	21	19
3	8:05	8	94	3:04	PVAM	Bernard Good 27-yard touchdown run, Zach Elder kick good	28	19
4	11:46	4	25	1:53	Rice	Austin Walter 8-yard touchdown run, Jack Fox kick good	28	26
4	10:15				Rice	PVAM rush for loss of 31 yards, team safety	28	28
4	0:00	9	52	4:28	Rice	23-yard field goal by Jack Fox	28	31
"TOP" = time of possession. For other American football terms, see Glossary of American football.							28	31

=== Houston ===
	1	2	3	4	Total
Cougars	3	14	14	14	45
Owls	7	17	3	0	27

=== At Hawaii ===
	1	2	3	4	Total
Owls	7	3	3	16	29
Rainbow Warriors	14	7	7	15	43

=== At Southern Miss ===
	1	2	3	4	Total
Owls	8	7	0	7	22
Golden Eagles	10	14	10	6	40

=== At Wake Forest ===
	1	2	3	4	Total
Owls	0	3	14	7	24
Demon Deacons	21	21	14	0	56

=== UTSA ===
	1	2	3	4	Total
Roadrunners	3	10	0	7	20
Owls	0	0	3	0	3

=== UAB ===
	1	2	3	4	Total
Blazers	14	14	14	0	42
Owls	0	0	0	0	0

=== At FIU ===
	1	2	3	4	Total
Owls	7	3	7	0	17
Panthers	0	16	10	10	36

=== At North Texas ===
	1	2	3	4	Total
Owls	7	3	7	0	17
Mean Green	10	7	3	21	41

=== UTEP ===
	1	2	3	4	Total
Miners	7	20	7	0	34
Owls	0	3	7	16	26

=== At Louisiana Tech ===
	1	2	3	4	Total
Owls	0	3	7	3	13
Bulldogs	0	7	14	7	28

=== At LSU ===
	1	2	3	4	Total
Owls	0	3	0	7	10
No. 10 Tigers	14	14	7	7	42

=== Old Dominion ===
	1	2	3	4	Total
Monarchs	3	3	7	0	13
Owls	6	7	7	7	27
