= 2018 Old Dominion Monarchs football team =

American college football season

2018 Old Dominion Monarchs football
- Conference: Conference USA
- East Division
- Record: 4–8 (2–6 C-USA)
- Head coach: Bobby Wilder (10th season)
- Offensive coordinator: Brian Scott (10th season)
- Offensive scheme: Hurry-up spread option
- Defensive coordinator: Rich Nagy (6th season)
- Base defense: 3–3–5
- Home stadium: Foreman Field

2018 Conference USA football standings
	Conf.			Overall
Team	W		L	W		L
East Division
Middle Tennessee x	7	–	1	8	–	6
FIU	6	–	2	9	–	4
Marshall	6	–	2	9	–	4
Charlotte	4	–	4	5	–	7
Florida Atlantic	3	–	5	5	–	7
Old Dominion	2	–	6	4	–	8
Western Kentucky	2	–	6	3	–	9
West Division
UAB x$	7	–	1	11	–	3
North Texas	5	–	3	9	–	4
Louisiana Tech	5	–	3	8	–	5
Southern Miss	5	–	3	6	–	5
UTSA	2	–	6	3	–	9
UTEP	1	–	7	1	–	11
Rice	1	–	7	2	–	11
Championship: UAB 27, Middle Tennessee 25
$ – Conference champion; x – Division champion/co-champions

The 2018 Old Dominion Monarchs football team represented Old Dominion University in the 2018 NCAA Division I FBS football season. The Monarchs played their home games at the Foreman Field in Norfolk, Virginia as members of the East Division of Conference USA (C–USA). They were led by tenth-year head coach Bobby Wilder. They finished the season 4–8, 2–6 in C-USA play to finish in a tie for sixth place in the East Division. ODU's streak of home sell-outs (59 total games) ended with the FIU game. ODU had sold out every home game since they restarted the football program in 2009.

== Preseason ==
=== Award watch lists ===
Listed in the order that they were released

Award	Player	Position	Year
Rimington Trophy	Nick Clarke	C	SR
Chuck Bednarik Award	Oshane Ximines	DE	SR
Doak Walker Award	Jeremy Cox	RB	SR
Bronko Nagurski Trophy	Oshane Ximines	DE	SR
Ray Guy Award	Bailey Cate	P	JR
Paul Hornung Award	Isaiah Harper	WR/KR	SR
Wuerffel Trophy	Oshane Ximines	DE	SR
Ted Hendricks Award	Oshane Ximines	DE	SR

=== Preseason All-CUSA team ===
Conference USA released their preseason all-CUSA team on July 16, 2018, with the Monarchs having three players selected.

Defense

- Oshane Ximines – DL

Special teams

- Isaiah Harper – KR
- Darrell Brown – PR

=== Preseason media poll ===
Conference USA released their preseason media poll on July 17, 2018, with the Monarchs predicted to finish in sixth place in the East Division.

== Schedule ==
Date	Time	Opponent	Site	TV	Result	Attendance
September 1	6:00 p.m.	at Liberty*	Williams Stadium; Lynchburg, VA	ESPN3	L 10–52	20,425
September 8	7:30 p.m.	FIU	Foreman Field; Norfolk, VA	beIN	L 20–28	19,243
September 13 (Note: This game was originally scheduled for September 15. It was moved up two days in anticipation of Hurricane Florence.)	4:00 p.m.	at Charlotte	Jerry Richardson Stadium; Charlotte, NC	ESPN3	L 25–28	8,204
September 22	3:30 p.m.	No. 13 Virginia Tech*	Foreman Field; Norfolk, VA	CBSSN	W 49–35	20,532
September 29	3:30 p.m.	at East Carolina*	Dowdy–Ficklen Stadium; Greenville, NC	ESPN3	L 35–37	35,047
October 6	5:00 p.m.	at Florida Atlantic	FAU Stadium; Boca Raton, FL	Stadium	L 33–52	18,204
October 13	3:30 p.m.	Marshall	Foreman Field; Norfolk, VA	Stadium	L 20–42	20,118
October 20	7:30 p.m.	at Western Kentucky	Houchens–Smith Stadium; Bowling Green, KY	ESPN+	W 37–34	13,269
October 27	3:30 p.m.	Middle Tennessee	Foreman Field; Norfolk, VA	ESPN+	L 17–51	19,725
November 10	3:30 p.m.	North Texas	Foreman Field; Norfolk, VA	ESPN3	W 34–31	18,062
November 17	2:00 p.m.	VMI*	Foreman Field; Norfolk, VA (Oyster Bowl)	ESPN+	W 77–14	20,118
November 24	1:00 p.m.	at Rice	Rice Stadium; Houston, TX	ESPN+	L 13–27	18,083
*Non-conference game; Rankings from AP Poll released prior to the game; All times are in Eastern time

== Game summaries ==
=== At Liberty ===
	1	2	3	4	Total
Monarchs	3	7	0	0	10
Flames	14	0	10	28	52

=== FIU ===
	1	2	3	4	Total
Panthers	0	14	14	0	28
Monarchs	7	13	0	0	20

=== At Charlotte ===
	1	2	3	4	Total
Monarchs	6	6	6	7	25
49ers	7	6	8	7	28

=== Virginia Tech ===
	1	2	3	4	Total
No. 13 Hokies	7	7	14	7	35
Monarchs	7	7	7	28	49

This marked Old Dominion's first win over a Power Five program in their FBS history.

=== At East Carolina ===
	1	2	3	4	Total
Monarchs	14	6	7	8	35
Pirates	14	7	7	9	37

=== At Florida Atlantic ===
	1	2	3	4	Total
Monarchs	0	7	14	12	33
Owls	6	20	6	20	52

=== Marshall ===
	1	2	3	4	Total
Thundering Herd	0	14	7	21	42
Monarchs	0	3	7	10	20

=== At Western Kentucky ===
	1	2	3	4	Total
Monarchs	14	3	2	18	37
Hilltoppers	7	17	3	7	34

=== Middle Tennessee ===
	1	2	3	4	Total
Blue Raiders	17	14	14	6	51
Monarchs	7	3	7	0	17

=== North Texas ===
	1	2	3	4	Total
Mean Green	14	14	3	0	31
Monarchs	0	10	14	10	34

=== VMI ===
	1	2	3	4	Total
Keydets	0	0	14	0	14
Monarchs	21	28	14	14	77

=== At Rice ===
	1	2	3	4	Total
Monarchs	3	3	7	0	13
Owls	6	7	7	7	27

== Players drafted into the NFL ==
Round	Pick	Player	Position	NFL Club
3	95	Oshane Ximines	DE	New York Giants
6	184	Travis Fulgham	WR	Detroit Lions
