= 2018 UTSA Roadrunners football team =

American college football season

2018 UTSA Roadrunners football
- Conference: Conference USA
- West Division
- Record: 3–9 (2–6 C-USA)
- Head coach: Frank Wilson (3rd season)
- Offensive coordinator: Al Borges (1st season)
- Offensive scheme: Pro spread
- Defensive coordinator: Jason Rollins (1st season)
- Base defense: 4–3
- Home stadium: Alamodome

2018 Conference USA football standings
	Conf.			Overall
Team	W		L	W		L
East Division
Middle Tennessee x	7	–	1	8	–	6
FIU	6	–	2	9	–	4
Marshall	6	–	2	9	–	4
Charlotte	4	–	4	5	–	7
Florida Atlantic	3	–	5	5	–	7
Old Dominion	2	–	6	4	–	8
Western Kentucky	2	–	6	3	–	9
West Division
UAB x$	7	–	1	11	–	3
North Texas	5	–	3	9	–	4
Louisiana Tech	5	–	3	8	–	5
Southern Miss	5	–	3	6	–	5
UTSA	2	–	6	3	–	9
UTEP	1	–	7	1	–	11
Rice	1	–	7	2	–	11
Championship: UAB 27, Middle Tennessee 25
$ – Conference champion; x – Division champion/co-champions

The 2018 UTSA Roadrunners football team represented the University of Texas at San Antonio in the 2018 NCAA Division I FBS football season. The Roadrunners played their home games at the Alamodome in San Antonio, TX, and competed in the West Division of Conference USA (C–USA). They were led by third-year head coach Frank Wilson. They finished the season 3–9, 2–6 in C-USA play to finish in fifth place in the West Division.

== Preseason ==
=== Award watch lists ===
Award	Player	Position	Year
Lou Groza Award	Jared Sackett	K	SO
Wuerffel Trophy	Jalen Rhodes	RB	SR
Wuerffel Trophy	Josiah Tauaefa	LB	JR
Earl Campbell Tyler Rose Award	Jalen Rhodes	RB	SR

=== Preseason All-CUSA team ===
Conference USA released their preseason all-CUSA team on July 16, 2018, with the Roadrunners having two players selected.

Defense

Kevin Strong – DL

Josiah Tauaefa – LB

=== Preseason media poll ===
Conference USA released their preseason media poll on July 17, 2018, with the Roadrunners predicted to finish in fifth place in the West Division.

== Schedule ==
Date	Time	Opponent	Site	TV	Result	Attendance
September 1	9:30 p.m.	at Arizona State*	Sun Devil Stadium; Tempe, AZ	FS1	L 7–49	50,188
September 8	6:00 p.m.	Baylor*	Alamodome; San Antonio, TX	CBSSN	L 20–37	42,071
September 15	3:00 p.m.	at Kansas State*	Bill Snyder Family Football Stadium; Manhattan, KS	FSN	L 17–41	50,618
September 22	6:00 p.m.	Texas State*	Alamodome; San Antonio, TX (I-35 Rivalry)	ESPN+	W 25–21	29,205
September 29	6:00 p.m.	UTEP	Alamodome; San Antonio, TX	ESPN+	W 30–21	20,176
October 6	6:00 p.m.	at Rice	Rice Stadium; Houston, TX	ESPN3	W 20–3	19,170
October 13	6:00 p.m.	Louisiana Tech^{†}	Alamodome; San Antonio, TX	ESPN+	L 3–31	20,057
October 20	6:00 p.m.	at Southern Miss	M. M. Roberts Stadium; Hattiesburg, MS	ESPN+	L 17–27	21,259
November 3	6:30 p.m.	at UAB	Legion Field; Birmingham, AL	beIN	L 3–52	17,605
November 10	6:00 p.m.	FIU	Alamodome; San Antonio, TX	ESPN+	L 7–45	16,874
November 17	1:30 p.m.	at Marshall	Joan C. Edwards Stadium; Huntington, WV	Stadium	L 0–23	18,502
November 24	6:00 p.m.	North Texas	Alamodome; San Antonio, TX	ESPN+	L 21–24	19,874
*Non-conference game; ^{†}Homecoming; Rankings from AP Poll released prior to the game; All times are in Central time

Schedule source:

== Game summaries ==
=== At Arizona State ===
	1	2	3	4	Total
Roadrunners	0	0	0	7	7
Sun Devils	14	14	14	7	49

=== Baylor ===
	1	2	3	4	Total
Bears	10	10	7	10	37
Roadrunners	3	10	0	7	20

=== At Kansas State ===
	1	2	3	4	Total
Roadrunners	7	0	0	10	17
Wildcats	10	17	14	0	41

UTSA's defense gave up over 400 yards to Kansas State and dropped their record to 0-3, where Kansas State advanced to 2-1 for the season. UTSA head coach Frank Wilson said, "Unfortunately we did not always execute to the fullest, but I think take away a couple of big-play opportunities, they weren't going methodically down the field and just shoving us around. We held them to some third-down opportunities, but we just couldn't get them off the field."

=== Texas State ===
	1	2	3	4	Total
Bobcats	7	0	7	7	21
Roadrunners	14	3	0	8	25

=== UTEP ===
	1	2	3	4	Total
Miners	7	0	7	7	21
Roadrunners	7	17	0	6	30

=== At Rice ===
	1	2	3	4	Total
Roadrunners	3	10	0	7	20
Owls	0	0	3	0	3

=== Louisiana Tech ===
	1	2	3	4	Total
Bulldogs	7	10	7	7	31
Roadrunners	0	0	3	0	3

=== At Southern Miss ===
	1	2	3	4	Total
Roadrunners	0	3	7	7	17
Golden Eagles	6	14	7	0	27

=== At UAB ===
	1	2	3	4	Total
Roadrunners	3	0	0	0	3
Blazers	21	17	7	7	52

=== FIU ===
	1	2	3	4	Total
Panthers	0	17	7	21	45
Roadrunners	0	0	0	7	7

=== At Marshall ===
	1	2	3	4	Total
Roadrunners	0	0	0	0	0
Thundering Herd	10	10	3	0	23

=== North Texas ===
	1	2	3	4	Total
Mean Green	10	7	7	0	24
Roadrunners	0	14	0	7	21
