= 2018 Western Kentucky Hilltoppers football team =

American college football season

2018 Western Kentucky Hilltoppers football
- Conference: Conference USA
- East Division
- Record: 3–9 (2–6 C-USA)
- Head coach: Mike Sanford Jr. (2nd season)
- Offensive coordinator: Junior Adams (2nd season)
- Offensive scheme: Multiple
- Defensive coordinator: Clayton White (2nd season)
- Base defense: 4–2–5
- Home stadium: Houchens Industries–L. T. Smith Stadium

2018 Conference USA football standings
	Conf.			Overall
Team	W		L	W		L
East Division
Middle Tennessee x	7	–	1	8	–	6
FIU	6	–	2	9	–	4
Marshall	6	–	2	9	–	4
Charlotte	4	–	4	5	–	7
Florida Atlantic	3	–	5	5	–	7
Old Dominion	2	–	6	4	–	8
Western Kentucky	2	–	6	3	–	9
West Division
UAB x$	7	–	1	11	–	3
North Texas	5	–	3	9	–	4
Louisiana Tech	5	–	3	8	–	5
Southern Miss	5	–	3	6	–	5
UTSA	2	–	6	3	–	9
UTEP	1	–	7	1	–	11
Rice	1	–	7	2	–	11
Championship: UAB 27, Middle Tennessee 25
$ – Conference champion; x – Division champion/co-champions

The 2018 Western Kentucky Hilltoppers football team (WKU) represented Western Kentucky University in the 2018 NCAA Division I FBS football season. The Hilltoppers played their home games at the Houchens Industries–L. T. Smith Stadium in Bowling Green, Kentucky as members of the East Division of Conference USA (C–USA). They were led by second-year head coach Mike Sanford Jr. They finished the season 3–9, 2–6 in C-USA play to finish in a tie for sixth place in the East Division.

On November 25, head coach Mike Sanford Jr. was fired after only two seasons. He finished at WKU with a record of 9–16.

== Preseason ==
=== Award watch lists ===
Listed in the order that they were released

Award	Player	Position	Year
John Mackey Award	Mik'Quan Deane	TE	SR
Wuerffel Trophy	Julien Lewis	DL	SR

=== Preseason media poll ===
Conference USA released their preseason media poll on July 17, 2018, with the Hilltoppers predicted to finish in fourth place in the East Division.

East Division
Predicted finish	Team
1	Florida Atlantic
2	Marshall
3	Middle Tennessee
4	FIU
5	Western Kentucky
6	Old Dominion
7	Charlotte

== Schedule ==
Date	Time	Opponent	Site	TV	Result	Attendance
August 31	8:00 p.m.	at No. 4 Wisconsin*	Camp Randall Stadium; Madison, WI	ESPN	L 3–34	74,145
September 8	6:30 p.m.	No. 22 (FCS) Maine*	Houchens Industries–L. T. Smith Stadium; Bowling Green, KY	ESPN+	L 28–31	15,178
September 15	6:30 p.m.	at Louisville*	Cardinal Stadium; Louisville, KY	ACCRSN	L 17–20	54,923
September 22	2:00 p.m.	at Ball State*	Scheumann Stadium; Muncie, IN	ESPN3	W 28–20	15,873
September 29	6:30 p.m.	Marshall	Houchens Industries–L. T. Smith Stadium; Bowling Green, KY	Stadium	L 17–20	20,811
October 13	2:30 p.m.	at Charlotte	Jerry Richardson Stadium; Charlotte, NC	ESPN+	L 14–40	11,610
October 20	6:30 p.m.	Old Dominion	Houchens Industries–L. T. Smith Stadium; Bowling Green, KY	ESPN+	L 34–37	13,269
October 27	6:30 p.m.	FIU	Houchens Industries–L. T. Smith Stadium; Bowling Green, KY	beIN	L 17–38	15,138
November 2	7:00 p.m.	at Middle Tennessee	Johnny "Red" Floyd Stadium; Murfreesboro, TN (100 Miles of Hate)	CBSSN	L 10–29	16,617
November 10	4:00 p.m.	at Florida Atlantic	FAU Stadium; Boca Raton, FL	Stadium	L 15–34	14,400
November 17	6:30 p.m.	UTEP	Houchens Industries–L. T. Smith Stadium; Bowling Green, KY	beIN	W 40–16	6,221
November 24	11:00 a.m.	at Louisiana Tech	Joe Aillet Stadium; Ruston, LA	CBSSN	W 30–15	11,459
*Non-conference game; Rankings from AP Poll released prior to the game; All times are in Central time

Schedule source:

== Game summaries ==
=== At Wisconsin ===
	1	2	3	4	Total
Hilltoppers	0	0	3	0	3
No. 4 Badgers	7	17	3	7	34

=== Maine ===
	1	2	3	4	Total
No. 22 (FCS) Black Bears	0	14	14	3	31
Hilltoppers	21	0	0	7	28

=== At Louisville ===
	1	2	3	4	Total
Hilltoppers	7	7	0	3	17
Cardinals	0	3	3	14	20

=== At Ball State ===
	1	2	3	4	Total
Hilltoppers	0	7	7	14	28
Cardinals	7	3	3	7	20

=== Marshall ===
	1	2	3	4	Total
Thundering Herd	7	3	0	10	20
Hilltoppers	3	7	0	7	17

=== At Charlotte ===
	1	2	3	4	Total
Hilltoppers	7	0	0	7	14
49ers	6	3	21	10	40

=== Old Dominion ===
	1	2	3	4	Total
Monarchs	14	3	2	18	37
Hilltoppers	7	17	3	7	34

=== FIU ===
	1	2	3	4	Total
Panthers	7	7	14	10	38
Hilltoppers	0	3	0	14	17

=== At Middle Tennessee ===
	1	2	3	4	Total
Hilltoppers	3	0	7	0	10
Blue Raiders	10	10	3	6	29

=== At Florida Atlantic ===
	1	2	3	4	Total
Hilltoppers	0	9	0	6	15
Owls	10	0	7	17	34

=== UTEP ===
	1	2	3	4	Total
Miners	0	0	8	8	16
Hilltoppers	27	13	0	0	40

=== At Louisiana Tech ===
	1	2	3	4	Total
Hilltoppers	14	9	0	7	30
Bulldogs	0	12	3	0	15
