= 2018 Southern Miss Golden Eagles football team =

American college football season

2018 Southern Miss Golden Eagles football
- Conference: Conference USA
- West Division
- Record: 6–5 (5–3 C-USA)
- Head coach: Jay Hopson (3rd season)
- Offensive coordinator: Shannon Dawson (3rd season)
- Offensive scheme: Spread
- Co-defensive coordinators: Tim Billings (1st season); Derek Nicholson (1st season)
- Base defense: Multiple
- Home stadium: M. M. Roberts Stadium

2018 Conference USA football standings
	Conf.			Overall
Team	W		L	W		L
East Division
Middle Tennessee x	7	–	1	8	–	6
FIU	6	–	2	9	–	4
Marshall	6	–	2	9	–	4
Charlotte	4	–	4	5	–	7
Florida Atlantic	3	–	5	5	–	7
Old Dominion	2	–	6	4	–	8
Western Kentucky	2	–	6	3	–	9
West Division
UAB x$	7	–	1	11	–	3
North Texas	5	–	3	9	–	4
Louisiana Tech	5	–	3	8	–	5
Southern Miss	5	–	3	6	–	5
UTSA	2	–	6	3	–	9
UTEP	1	–	7	1	–	11
Rice	1	–	7	2	–	11
Championship: UAB 27, Middle Tennessee 25
$ – Conference champion; x – Division champion/co-champions

The 2018 Southern Miss Golden Eagles football team represented the University of Southern Mississippi in the 2018 NCAA Division I FBS football season. The Golden Eagles played their home games at the M. M. Roberts Stadium in Hattiesburg, Mississippi and competed in the West Division of Conference USA (C–USA). They were led by third-year head coach Jay Hopson. They finished the season 6–5, 5–3 in C-USA play to finish in a three-way tie for second in the West Division. Despite being bowl eligible, they were not invited to a bowl game.

== Preseason ==
=== Award watch lists ===
Award	Player	Position	Year
Lou Groza Award	Parker Shaunfield	K	SR
Wuerffel Trophy	Picasso Nelson, Jr.	DB	SR

=== C-USA preseason awards ===
On July 16, 2018, Conference USA released their preseason awards, including the preseason all-CUSA team. Kicker Paker Shaunfield was selected as the preseason special teams player of the year. He was the only player named to the all-CUSA team.

=== Preseason media poll ===
Conference USA released their preseason media poll on July 17, 2018, with the Golden Eagles predicted to finish in fourth place in the West Division.

== Schedule ==
Date	Time	Opponent	Site	TV	Result	Attendance
September 1	6:00 p.m.	Jackson State*	M. M. Roberts Stadium; Hattiesburg, MS	ESPN+	W 55–7	29,176
September 8	6:00 p.m.	Louisiana–Monroe*	M. M. Roberts Stadium; Hattiesburg, MS	ESPN3	L 20–21	19,579
~~September 15~~	~~2:30 p.m.~~	at ~~Appalachian State~~*	~~Kidd Brewer Stadium~~; ~~Boone, NC~~	~~ESPN+~~	Cancelled (Note: This game was cancelled in anticipation of Hurricane Florence.)	
September 22	6:00 p.m.	Rice	M. M. Roberts Stadium; Hattiesburg, MS	ESPN+	W 40–22	20,159
September 29	3:00 p.m.	at No. 10 Auburn*	Jordan–Hare Stadium; Auburn, AL	SECN	L 13–24	83,792
October 13	1:00 p.m.	at North Texas	Apogee Stadium; Denton, TX	ESPN3	L 7–30	18,252
October 20	6:00 p.m.	UTSA^{†}	M. M. Roberts Stadium; Hattiesburg, MS	ESPN+	W 27–17	21,259
October 27	1:00 p.m.	at Charlotte	Jerry Richardson Stadium; Charlotte, NC	ESPN3	L 17–20	8,687
November 3	2:00 p.m.	Marshall	M. M. Roberts Stadium; Hattiesburg, MS	Stadium	W 26–24	20,375
November 10	6:30 p.m.	at UAB	Legion Field; Birmingham, AL	beIN	L 23–26 ^{OT}	25,618
November 17	2:30 p.m.	Louisiana Tech	M. M. Roberts Stadium; Hattiesburg, MS (Rivalry in Dixie)	Stadium	W 21–20	19,142
November 24	2:00 p.m.	at UTEP	Sun Bowl; El Paso, TX	ESPN+	W 39–7	14,962
*Non-conference game; ^{†}Homecoming; Rankings from AP Poll released prior to the game; All times are in Central time

Schedule source:

== Game summaries ==
=== Jackson State ===
Week One: Jackson State Tigers at Southern Miss Golden Eagles – Game summary

Quarter	1	2	3	4	Total
Tigers	0	0	7	0	7
Golden Eagles	14	27	7	7	55

at M. M. Roberts Stadium, Hattiesburg, MS

- Date: September 1
- Game time: 6:00 p.m. CDT
- Game attendance: 29,176
- TV: ESPN+

Game information

First quarter
Second quarter
Third quarter
Fourth quarter

Leading Passers

- JSU –
- USM –

Leading Rushers

- JSU –
- USM –

Leading Receivers

- JSU –
- USM –

Leading Tacklers

- JSU –
- USM –

=== Louisiana–Monroe ===
Week Two: Louisiana–Monroe Warhawks at Southern Miss Golden Eagles – Game summary

Quarter	1	2	3	4	Total
Warhawks	14	0	7	0	21
Golden Eagles	10	7	3	0	20

at M. M. Roberts Stadium, Hattiesburg, MS

- Date: September 8
- Game time: 6:00 p.m. CDT
- Game weather: 87° · Partly Cloudy · SSW – 7 mph.
- Game attendance: 19,579
- Referee: Marshall Lewis
- TV: ESPN3

Game information

First quarter

- USM - Jaylond Adams 75-yard TD pass from Jack Abraham, Parker Shaunfield kick good, 14:47 (USM 7-0)
- ULM - Sam Miller 0-yard fumble return for TD, Craig Ford kick good, 12:05 (TIE 7-7)
- ULM - Marcus Green 49-yard TD pass from Caleb Evans, Ford kick good, 4:37 (ULM 14-7)
- USM - Shaunfield 42-yard field goal, 2:01 (ULM 14-10)

Second quarter

- USM - Quez Watkins 5-yard TD pass from Abraham, Shaunfield kick good, 6:36 (USM 14-17)

Third quarter

- ULM - Green 4-yard TD pass from Evans, Ford kick good, 14:03 (ULM 21-17)
- USM - Shaunfield 47-yard field goal, 6:51 (ULM 21-20)

Leading Passers

- ULM - Caleb Evans - 15/28, 195 yards, 2 TD, INT
- USM - Jack Abraham - 31/46, 378 yards, 2 TD, 2 INT

Leading Rushers

- ULM - Austin Vaughn - 9 carries, 85 yards
- USM - Tez Parks - 17 carries, 42 yards

Leading Receivers

- ULM - Marcus Green - 4 receptions, 96 yards, 2 TD
- USM - Jaylond Adams - 9 receptions, 158 yards, TD

Leading Tacklers

- ULM - Collin Turner – 10 tackles
- USM - Picasso Nelson Jr. – 7 tackles

=== Rice ===
Week Four: Rice Owls at Southern Miss Golden Eagles – Game summary

Quarter	1	2	3	4	Total
Owls	8	7	0	7	22
Golden Eagles	10	14	10	6	40

at M. M. Roberts Stadium, Hattiesburg, MS

- Date: September 22
- Game time: 6:00 p.m. CDT
- Game attendance: 20,159
- TV: ESPN+

Game information

First quarter
Second quarter
Third quarter
Fourth quarter

Leading Passers

- RICE –
- USM –

Leading Rushers

- RICE –
- USM –

Leading Receivers

- RICE –
- USM –

Leading Tacklers

- RICE –
- USM –

=== At Auburn ===
Week Five: Southern Miss Golden Eagles at Auburn Tigers – Game summary

Quarter	1	2	3	4	Total
Golden Eagles	0	3	3	7	13
No. 10 Tigers	7	7	7	3	24

at Jordan-Hare Stadium, Auburn, AL

- Date: September 29
- Game time: 3:00 p.m. CDT
- Game weather: Sunny • Temperature: 85 °F (29 °C) • Wind: NW 3 miles per hour (4.8 km/h)
- Game attendance: 83,792
- Referee: David Smith
- TV announcers (SECN): Dave Neal (play-by-play), D.J. Shockley (analyst), Dawn Davenport (sideline reporter)

Game information

First quarter

- AUB – Seth Williams 46 yd pass from Jarrett Stidham (Anders Carlson kick), 3:39 (AUB 7–0)

Second quarter

- USM – Parker Shaunfield 44 yd field goal, 12:51 (AUB 7–3)
- AUB – Anthony Schwartz 6 yd run (Anders Carlson kick), 6:43 (AUB 14–3)

Third quarter

- USM – Parker Shaunfield 51 yd field goal, 7:20 (AUB 14–6)
- AUB – Chandler Cox 2 yd pass from Jarrett Stidham (Anders Carlson kick), 5:39 (AUB 21–6)

Fourth quarter

- USM – Quez Watkins 12 yd pass from Jack Abraham (Parker Shaunfield kick), 13:47 (AUB 21–13)
- AUB – Anders Carlson 23 yd field goal, 2:00 (AUB 24–13)

Leading Passers

- USM – Jack Abraham – 30/44, 215 yards, TD, 2 INT
- AUB – Jarrett Stidham – 19/33, 245 yards, 2 TD

Leading Rushers

- USM – Trivensky Mosley – 4 carries, 25 yards
- AUB – Kam Martin – 24 carries, 90 yards

Leading Receivers

- USM – Jaylond Adams – 8 receptions, 47 yards
- AUB – Darius Slayton – 5 receptions, 91 yards

Leading Tacklers

- USM – Shannon Showers – 8 tackles
- AUB – Deshaun Davis – 10 tackles

=== At North Texas ===
Week Seven: Southern Miss Golden Eagles at North Texas Mean Green – Game summary

Quarter	1	2	3	4	Total
Golden Eagles	0	7	0	0	7
Mean Green	0	10	6	14	30

at Apogee Stadium, Denton, TX

- Date: October 13
- Game time: 1:00 p.m. CDT
- Game weather: Overcast and rain • Temperature: 60 °F (16 °C) • Wind: NE 12 miles per hour (19 km/h)
- Game attendance: 18,252
- Referee: Justin Elliot
- TV: ESPN3

Game information

First quarter

No scoring plays

Second quarter

- UNT – Jalen Guyton 53-yard pass from Mason Fine (Cole Hedlund kick), 13:11. Mean Green 7–0. Drive: 8 plays, 99 yards, 2:45.
- USM – Quez Watkins 44-yard pass from Jack Abraham (Parker Shaunfield kick), 11:06. Tied 7–7. Drive: 5 plays, 75 yards, 2:05.
- UNT – Cole Hedlund 41-yard field goal, 7:11. Mean Green 10–7. Drive: 8 plays, 43 yards, 3:55.

Third quarter

- UNT – DeAndre Torrey 6-yard run (Cole Hedlund PAT blocked), 0:34. Mean Green 16–7. Drive: 9 plays, 68 yards, 3:29.

Fourth quarter

- UNT – DeAndre Torrey 8-yard run (Cole Hedlund kick), 10:45. Mean Green 23–7. Drive: 7 plays, 48 yards, 3:22.
- UNT – DeAndre Torrey 34-yard run (Cole Hedlund kick), 0:33. Mean Green 30–7. Drive: 6 plays, 58 yards, 2:33.

Leading Passers

- USM – Jack Abraham – 29/42, 318 yards, TD, INT
- UNT – Mason Fine – 24/38, 292 yards, TD

Leading Rushers

- USM – Trivenskey Mosley – 11 carries, 73 yards
- UNT – DeAndre Torrey – 17 carries, 95 yards, 3 TD

Leading Receivers

- USM – Jordan Mitchell – 12 receptions, 135 yards
- UNT – Jalen Guyton – 7 receptions, 124 yards, TD

Leading Tacklers

- USM – Picasso Nelson – 8 tackles
- UNT – E. J. Ejiya – 12 tackles

=== UTSA ===
Week Eight: UTSA Roadrunners at Southern Miss Golden Eagles – Game summary

Quarter	1	2	3	4	Total
Roadrunners	0	3	7	7	17
Golden Eagles	6	14	7	0	27

at M. M. Roberts Stadium, Hattiesburg, MS

- Date: October 20
- Game time: 6:00 p.m. CDT
- Game attendance: 21,259
- TV: ESPN+

Game information

First quarter
Second quarter
Third quarter
Fourth quarter

Leading Passers

- UTSA –
- USM –

Leading Rushers

- UTSA –
- USM –

Leading Receivers

- UTSA –
- USM –

Leading Tacklers

- UTSA –
- USM –

=== At Charlotte ===
Week Nine: Southern Miss Golden Eagles at Charlotte 49ers – Game summary

Quarter	1	2	3	4	Total
Golden Eagles	0	0	3	14	17
49ers	14	0	3	3	20

at Jerry Richardson Stadium, Charlotte, NC

- Date: October 27
- Game time: 1:00 p.m. CDT
- Game attendance: 8,687
- TV announcers (ESPN3): Bobby Rosinski, Reggie Walker, Libby Clark

Game information

First quarter
Second quarter
Third quarter
Fourth quarter

Leading Passers

- USM –
- CHAR –

Leading Rushers

- USM –
- CHAR –

Leading Receivers

- USM –
- CHAR –

Leading Tacklers

- USM –
- CHAR –

=== Marshall ===
Week Ten: Marshall Thundering Herd at Southern Miss Golden Eagles – Game summary

Quarter	1	2	3	4	Total
Thundering Herd	3	7	7	7	24
Golden Eagles	3	14	3	6	26

at M. M. Roberts Stadium, Hattiesburg, MS

- Date: November 3
- Game time: 2:00 p.m. CDT
- Game attendance: 20,375
- TV: Stadium

Game information

First quarter
Second quarter
Third quarter
Fourth quarter

Leading Passers

- MARSH –
- USM –

Leading Rushers

- MARSH –
- USM –

Leading Receivers

- MARSH –
- USM –

Leading Tacklers

- MARSH –
- USM –

=== At UAB ===
Week Eleven: Southern Miss Golden Eagles at Charlotte 49ers – Game summary

Quarter	1	2	3	4	OT	Total
Golden Eagles	7	6	0	7	3	23
Blazers	0	7	13	0	6	26

at Legion Field, Birmingham, AL

- Date: November 10
- Game time: 6:30 p.m. CST
- Game attendance: 25,618
- TV: beIN

Game information

First quarter
Second quarter
Third quarter
Fourth quarter

Leading Passers

- USM –
- UAB –

Leading Rushers

- USM –
- UAB –

Leading Receivers

- USM –
- UAB –

Leading Tacklers

- USM –
- UAB –

=== Louisiana Tech ===
Week Twelve: Louisiana Tech Bulldogs at Southern Miss Golden Eagles – Game summary

Quarter	1	2	3	4	Total
Bulldogs	7	10	0	3	20
Golden Eagles	7	7	0	7	21

at M. M. Roberts Stadium, Hattiesburg, MS

- Date: November 17
- Game time: 2:30 p.m. CST
- Game weather: 67 °F (19 °C); mostly sunny
- Game attendance: 19,142
- Referee: Dan Gautreaux
- TV: Stadium

Game information

First quarter

- USM - Steven Anderson 1-yard TD run, Briggs Bourgeois kick good, 6:54 (USM 7-0)
- LT - Adrian Hardy 5-yard TD pass from J'Mar Smith, Bailey Hale kick good, 1:28 (TIE 7-7)

Second quarter

- USM - Neil McLaurin 49-yard TD pass from Jack Abraham, Bourgeois kick good, 10:32 (USM 14-7)
- LT - Kam McKnight 6-yard TD run, Hale kick good, 4:39 (TIE 14-14)
- LT - Hale 24-yard field goal, 0:00 (LT 17-14)

Fourth quarter

- LT - Hale 23-yard field goal, 13:40 (LT 20-14)
- USM - Anderson 6-yard TD run, Bourgeois kick good, 6:02 (USM 21-20)

Leading Passers

- LT – J'Mar Smith – 27/43, 243 yards, TD
- USM – Jack Abraham – 24/29, 195 yards, TD

Leading Rushers

- LT – Israel Tucker – 9 carries, 24 yards
- USM – Steven Anderson – 12 carries, 29 yards, 2 TD

Leading Receivers

- LT – Adrian Hardy – 11 receptions, 110 yards, TD
- USM – Quez Watkins – 9 receptions, 110 yards

Leading Tacklers

- LT – Collin Scott – 9 tackles
- USM – Xavier Marion – 8 tackles

=== At UTEP ===
Week Thirteen: Southern Miss Golden Eagles at UTEP Miners – Game summary

Quarter	1	2	3	4	Total
Golden Eagles	16	3	7	13	39
Miners	0	0	0	7	7

at Sun Bowl, El Paso, TX

- Date: November 24
- Game time: 2:00 p.m. CST
- Game attendance: 14,962
- TV: ESPN+

Game information

First quarter
Second quarter
Third quarter
Fourth quarter

Leading Passers

- USM –
- UTEP –

Leading Rushers

- USM –
- UTEP –

Leading Receivers

- USM –
- UTEP –

Leading Tacklers

- USM –
- UTEP –
