= 2018 New Orleans Bowl =

College football bowl game

2018 R+L Carriers New Orleans Bowl
- 18th New Orleans Bowl
Middle Tennessee Blue Raiders	Appalachian State Mountaineers
(8–5)	(10–2)
C-USA	Sun Belt
13	45
Head coach: Rick Stockstill	Head coach: Mark Ivey (interim)
	1	2	3	4	Total
Middle Tennessee	3	3	7	0	13
Appalachian State	0	24	14	7	45
- Date: December 15, 2018
- Season: 2018
- Stadium: Mercedes-Benz Superdome
- Location: New Orleans, Louisiana
- MVP: Zac Thomas (QB, Appalachian State)
- Favorite: Appalachian State by 7
- Referee: Adam Savoie (AAC)
- Attendance: 23,942
- Payout: US$925,000

United States TV coverage
- Network: ESPN & ESPN Radio
- Announcers: Jason Benetti, Kelly Stouffer and Olivia Dekker (ESPN); Bill Rosinski, David Norrie and Ian Fitzsimmons (ESPN Radio)

International TV coverage
- Network: ESPN Deportes +
- Announcers: Eduardo Varela and Pablo Viruega

The 2018 New Orleans Bowl was a college football bowl game played on December 15, 2018, with kickoff scheduled for 9:00 p.m. EST (8:00 p.m. local CST). It was the 18th edition of the New Orleans Bowl, and one of the 2018–19 bowl games concluding the 2018 FBS football season. Sponsored by freight company R+L Carriers, the game was officially known as the R+L Carriers New Orleans Bowl.

== Teams ==
The game featured the Middle Tennessee Blue Raiders from Conference USA and the Appalachian State Mountaineers, the 2018 Sun Belt Conference champions. The teams previously met three times (1974, 1989, and 1992) with Middle Tennessee holding a 2–1 edge in the series.

=== Middle Tennessee Blue Raiders ===
Middle Tennessee was defeated in the 2018 Conference USA Football Championship Game on December 1; they subsequently received and accepted an invitation to the New Orleans Bowl on December 2. The Blue Raiders entered the bowl with an 8–5 record (7–1 in conference). Blue Raider quarterback Brent Stockstill is the son of head coach Rick Stockstill.

=== Appalachian State Mountaineers ===
Appalachian State defeated Louisiana in the 2018 Sun Belt Conference Football Championship Game to secure a berth in the New Orleans Bowl. The Mountaineers entered the bowl with a 10–2 record (7–1 in conference). Due to the resignation of head coach Scott Satterfield, who took the same position with the Louisville Cardinals on December 4, the Mountaineers were coached in the bowl game by interim head coach Mark Ivey.

== Game summary ==
=== Scoring summary ===
Scoring summary

Quarter	Time	Drive			Team	Scoring information	Score	
Quarter	Time	Plays	Yards	TOP	Team	Scoring information	MTSU	APP
1	5:15	7	39	3:18	MTSU	24-yard field goal by Crews Holt	3	0
2	13:48	10	72	4:34	APP	22-yard field goal by Chandler Staton	3	3
2	10:06	3	44	1:01	APP	Thomas Hennigan 30-yard touchdown reception from Malik Williams, Chandler Staton kick good	3	10
2	6:38	7	41	3:02	APP	Zac Thomas 8-yard touchdown reception from Malik Williams, Chandler Staton kick good	3	17
2	0:45	8	85	2:01	APP	Henry Pearson 1-yard touchdown reception from Zac Thomas, Chandler Staton kick good	3	24
2	0:00	6	59	0:45	MTSU	33-yard field goal by Crews Holt	6	24
3	11:06	10	75	3:54	APP	Corey Sutton 17-yard touchdown reception from Zac Thomas, Chandler Staton kick good	6	31
3	8:01	2	64	0:46	APP	Camerun Peoples 63-yard touchdown run, Chandler Staton kick good	6	38
3	5:56	5	75	2:05	MTSU	Isiah Upton 43-yard touchdown reception from Brent Stockstill, Crews Holt kick good	13	38
4	13:06	6	66	2:11	APP	Corey Sutton 11-yard touchdown reception from Zac Thomas, Chandler Staton kick good	13	45
"TOP" = time of possession. For other American football terms, see Glossary of American football.							13	45

=== Statistics ===
	1	2	3	4	Total
Blue Raiders	3	3	7	0	13
Mountaineers	0	24	14	7	45

Statistics	MTSU	APP
First downs	24	23
Plays–yards	72–392	60–448
Rushes–yards	35–62	34–233
Passing yards	330	215
Passing: Comp–Att–Int	25–37–2	17–26–2
Time of possession	33:31	26:29

Team	Category	Player	Statistics
Middle Tennessee	Passing	Brent Stockstill	25/37, 330 yds, 1 TD, 2 INT
Middle Tennessee	Rushing	Chaton Mobley	10 car, 45 yds
Middle Tennessee	Receiving	Gatlin Casey	6 rec, 64 yds
Appalachian State	Passing	Zac Thomas	15/24, 177 yds, 3 TD, 2 INT
Appalachian State	Rushing	Darrynton Evans	14 car, 108 yds
Appalachian State	Receiving	Corey Sutton	8 rec, 78 yds, 2 TD
