= 2018 Conference USA Football Championship Game =

2018 Globe Life Conference USA Football Championship Game
- 14th Conference USA Championship Game
UAB Blazers	Middle Tennessee Blue Raiders
(9–3)	(8–4)
27	25
Head coach: Bill Clark	Head coach: Rick Stockstill
	1	2	3	4	Total
UAB	3	21	0	3	27
Middle Tennessee	13	3	6	3	25
- Date: December 1, 2018
- Season: 2018
- Stadium: Johnny "Red" Floyd Stadium
- Location: Murfreesboro, Tennessee
- MVP: Spencer Brown, RB, UAB
- Favorite: Middle Tennessee by 1.5
- Attendance: 15,806

United States TV coverage
- Network: CBSSN
- Announcers: Carter Blackburn (Play-By-Play); Aaron Taylor (Analyst); John Schriffen (Sidelines)

2018 Conference USA football standings
	Conf.			Overall
Team	W		L	W		L
East Division
Middle Tennessee x	7	–	1	8	–	6
FIU	6	–	2	9	–	4
Marshall	6	–	2	9	–	4
Charlotte	4	–	4	5	–	7
Florida Atlantic	3	–	5	5	–	7
Old Dominion	2	–	6	4	–	8
Western Kentucky	2	–	6	3	–	9
West Division
UAB x$	7	–	1	11	–	3
North Texas	5	–	3	9	–	4
Louisiana Tech	5	–	3	8	–	5
Southern Miss	5	–	3	6	–	5
UTSA	2	–	6	3	–	9
UTEP	1	–	7	1	–	11
Rice	1	–	7	2	–	11
Championship: UAB 27, Middle Tennessee 25
$ – Conference champion; x – Division champion/co-champions

The 2018 Conference USA Football Championship Game was played on Saturday, December 1, 2018, at Johnny "Red" Floyd Stadium in Murfreesboro, Tennessee, and determined the 2018 football champion of Conference USA (CUSA). The game featured the East Division champion Middle Tennessee against the West Division champion UAB. The game was televised by CBS Sports Network for the first time in the 13 years of the game. With sponsorship from Globe Life and Accident Insurance Company, the game was formally named the 2018 Globe Life Conference USA Championship Game.

== Teams ==
=== UAB ===
The Blazers, in their second season after returning from a two-year hiatus, clinched at least a share of the West Division title, plus a spot in the championship game, with a 26–23 overtime win over Southern Miss on November 10. A Louisiana Tech loss to Southern Miss the following week gave UAB the outright division title. The Blazers lost 27–3 to Middle Tennessee in the final regularly scheduled game for both teams.

=== Middle Tennessee ===
In the final week of the regular season only two teams were in contention to win the East Division title: the Florida International (FIU) Panthers and the Middle Tennessee Blue Raiders. The Panthers had defeated the Blue Raiders on October 13 by three points, which would be the Blue Raiders' first and only loss in regular-season conference play. FIU led the division until their first conference loss against Florida Atlantic on November 3. This led to a tie with Middle Tennessee for first place in the East, with FIU's head-to-head win being the tie-breaker. The division title came down to the final day of the season. Had FIU defeated Marshall the Panthers would have won the East title, but the Thundering Herd upset them 28–25. FIU's loss, combined with Middle Tennessee's win over UAB, clinched the Blue Raiders as winners of the East.

=== Middle Tennessee vs. UAB series history ===
This match up will be the 7th all time meeting against the Blazers and Blue Raiders. They last played each other the week before the game on November 24. Middle Tennessee defeated UAB, the winner of the West Division, 27–3. The win secured the Blue Raiders spot to host the 2018 conference title game. After the November 24 match up, Middle Tennessee broke the tie against UAB, and now leads the all-time series 4–3.

== Game summary ==
=== Scoring summary ===
Scoring summary

Quarter	Time	Drive			Team	Scoring information	Score	
Quarter	Time	Plays	Yards	TOP	Team	Scoring information	UAB	MTSU
1	11:56	7	55	3:04	MTSU	37-yard field goal by Crews Holt	0	3
1	7:37	10	56	4:19	UAB	29-yard field goal by Nick Vogel	3	3
1	2:59	11	72	4:38	MTSU	20-yard field goal by Crews Holt	3	6
1	0:00	5	80	1:27	MTSU	Tavares Thomas 19-yard touchdown reception from Brent Stockstill, Crews Holt kick good	3	13
2	7:08	16	75	7:52	UAB	Spencer Brown 2-yard touchdown run, Nick Vogel kick good	10	13
2	4:15	4	68	1:29	UAB	Andre Wilson 40-yard touchdown reception from Tyler Johnston III, Nick Vogel kick good	17	13
2	3:20	3	35	0:35	UAB	Tyler Johnston III 3-yard touchdown run, Nick Vogel kick good	24	13
2	0:00	13	80	3:20	MTSU	20-yard field goal by Crews Holt	24	16
3	3:52	5	57	2:36	MTSU	Zach Dobson 46-yard touchdown reception from Brent Stockstill, 2-point pass failed	24	22
4	10:08	6	64	2:54	MTSU	33-yard field goal by Crews Holt	24	25
4	3:23	5	39	2:32	UAB	28-yard field goal by Nick Vogel	27	25
"TOP" = time of possession. For other American football terms, see Glossary of American football.							27	25

=== Statistics ===
	1	2	3	4	Total
Blazers	3	21	0	3	27
Blue Raiders	13	3	6	3	25

Statistics	UAB	MTSU
First downs	21	18
Plays–yards	69–365	69–456
Rushes–yards	54–225	24–94
Passing yards	140	362
Passing: Comp–Att–Int	9–15–1	29–45–2
Time of possession	31:45	28:15

Team	Category	Player	Statistics
UAB	Passing	Tyler Johnston III	9/15, 140 yds, 1 TD, 1 INT
UAB	Rushing	Spencer Brown	31 car, 156 yds, 1 TD
UAB	Receiving	Kailon Carter	1 rec, 43 yds
Middle Tennessee	Passing	Brent Stockstill	29/45, 362 yds, 2 TD, 2 INT
Middle Tennessee	Rushing	Zack Dobson	3 car, 52 yds
Middle Tennessee	Receiving	Terelle West	3 rec, 81 yds
