= 2018 Louisiana Tech Bulldogs football team =

American college football season

2018 Louisiana Tech Bulldogs football

Hawaii Bowl champion

Hawaii Bowl, W 31–14 vs. Hawaii
- Conference: Conference USA
- West Division
- Record: 8–5 (5–3 C-USA)
- Head coach: Skip Holtz (6th season)
- Offensive coordinator: Todd Fitch (3rd season)
- Offensive scheme: Multiple
- Defensive coordinator: Blake Baker (4th season)
- Base defense: 4–3
- Captains: O'Shea Dugas; Teddy Veal; Jaylon Ferguson; Dae'Von Washington
- Home stadium: Joe Aillet Stadium

2018 Conference USA football standings
	Conf.			Overall
Team	W		L	W		L
East Division
Middle Tennessee x	7	–	1	8	–	6
FIU	6	–	2	9	–	4
Marshall	6	–	2	9	–	4
Charlotte	4	–	4	5	–	7
Florida Atlantic	3	–	5	5	–	7
Old Dominion	2	–	6	4	–	8
Western Kentucky	2	–	6	3	–	9
West Division
UAB x$	7	–	1	11	–	3
North Texas	5	–	3	9	–	4
Louisiana Tech	5	–	3	8	–	5
Southern Miss	5	–	3	6	–	5
UTSA	2	–	6	3	–	9
UTEP	1	–	7	1	–	11
Rice	1	–	7	2	–	11
Championship: UAB 27, Middle Tennessee 25
$ – Conference champion; x – Division champion/co-champions

The 2018 Louisiana Tech Bulldogs football team represented Louisiana Tech University in the 2018 NCAA Division I FBS football season. The Bulldogs played their home games at the Joe Aillet Stadium in Ruston, Louisiana and competed in the West Division of Conference USA (C-USA). They were led by sixth-year head coach Skip Holtz. They finished the season 8–5, 5–3 in C-USA play to finish in a three-way tie for second place in the West Division. They were invited to the Hawaii Bowl where they defeated Hawaii.

== Preseason ==
=== Award watch lists ===
Listed in the order that they were released

Award	Player	Position	Year
Chuck Bednarik Award	Jaylon Ferguson	DE	SR
Fred Biletnikoff Award	Teddy Veal	WR	SR
Jim Thorpe Award	Amik Robertson	CB	SO
Bronko Nagurski Trophy	Jaylon Ferguson	DE	SR
Outland Trophy	O'Shea Dugas	OL	SR
Wuerffel Trophy	J'Mar Smith	QB	JR
Ted Hendricks Award	Jaylon Ferguson	DE	SR
Johnny Unitas Golden Arm Award	J'Mar Smith	QB	JR

=== Preseason All-Conference USA team ===
Conference USA released their preseason all-Conference USA team on July 16, 2018, with the Bulldogs having four players selected.

Offense

O'Shea Dugas – OL

Teddy Veal – WR

Defense

Jaylon Ferguson – DL

Amik Robertson – DB

=== Preseason media poll ===
Conference USA released their preseason media poll on July 17, 2018, with the Bulldogs predicted to finish in second place in the West Division.

== Roster ==
2018 Louisiana Tech Bulldogs football team roster
Players
Coaches
Offense

Pos.	#	Name	Class
WR	1	Rhashid Bonnette	Jr
QB	3	Aaron Allen	Fr
WR	4	Alfred Smith	So
WR	6	Adrian Hardy	So
QB	8	J'Mar Smith	Jr
WR	9	Teddy Veal	Sr
QB	10	Westin Elliott	Jr
WR	11	Jon Randall Belton	So
QB	13	Nate Cox	Fr
WR	13	Isaiah Graham	Jr
WR	14	Praise Okorie	So
RB/WR	15	Kam McKnight	Sr
TE	16	Zach Cousar	So
WR	19	Smoke Harris	Fr
RB	22	Israel Tucker	So
RB	23	Jaqwis Dancy	Jr
WR	24	Joshua Matthews	Fr
WR	27	Cualan Williams	Fr
RB	29	DeAndre Marcus	Fr
RB	30	Jordan Myles	Fr
RB	31	Justin Henderson	So
WR/RB	41	Bobby Holly	Jr
OL	54	Hanner Shipley	Sr
OL	55	Drew Kirkpatrick	Jr
OL	56	Jacob Adams	Fr
OL	57	DeVante Lovett	Jr
OL	59	Noah Pitre	Fr
OL	61	Ethan Reed	Jr
OL	62	Abraham Delfin	Fr
OL	64	Joshua Mote	Fr
OL	65	Kody Russey	So
OL	66	Shane Carpenter	Sr
OL	68	Justin Throckmorton	Fr
OL	69	Drake Carroll	Fr
OL	72	Christian Henderson	Fr
OL	73	Willie Allen	So
OL	74	O'Shea Dugas	Sr
OL	75	Michael Rodriguez	Sr
OL	76	Biron Rossell	Fr
OL	77	Gewhite Stallworth	Sr
OL	78	Taylor Fondel	So
WR	80	Griffin Hebert	Fr
WR	81	Cee Jay Powell	So
TE	82	Peyton Braswell	Jr
WR	83	Jake Norris	So
WR	84	Javonte Woodard	Jr
WR	86	Wayne Toussant	Fr
WR	87	George Scott	So
WR	89	Tahj Magee	Fr

Defense

Pos.	#	Name	Class
LB	2	Connor Taylor	Jr
LB	3	Trey Baldwin	Jr
CB	5	Michael Sam	Jr
S	7	Jaiden Cole	So
S	8	Brandon Floyd	Jr
S	10	James Jackson	Jr
S	14	Daniel Lewis	Sr
LB	16	Reggie Cleveland	So
CB	17	Brodrick Calhoun	Fr
CB	18	Zach Hannibal	So
S	20	Kollin Hurt	Fr
CB	21	Amik Robertson	So
CB	24	L'Jarius Sneed	Jr
S	25	Bee Jay Williamson	Fr
S	26	Jacorion Andrews	Fr
S	28	Jordan Baldwin	Sr
CB	30	Aaron Roberson	Jr
CB	32	Trey Spencer	Sr
LB	33	Dae'von Washington	Sr
LB	35	Collin Scott	Jr
CB	37	Ephraim Kitchen	Jr
S	38	Darryl Lewis	Jr
LB	39	Randy Hogan	Sr
S	42	Derek Turner	Fr
S	43	Xavier Lodge	Fr
LB	44	Brandon Durman	Sr
DE	45	Jaylon Ferguson	Sr
S	46	Ezekiel Barnett	So
DE	47	Eric Kendzior	Jr
LB	48	Alex Zayed	So
LB	49	Isaiah Windmon	Fr
DT	50	Chris Spence	So
DT	52	D. J. Jackson	Fr
LB	56	Jacob Adams	Fr
DT	58	Charles Adeola	Jr
DE	86	Willie Baker	So
DT	90	Courtney Wallace	Jr
DE	91	Steven Shaw	Fr
DT	92	La'Dante Davenport	Jr
DE	93	Immanuel Turner	Sr
DT	94	Jordan Bradford	Sr
DE	95	Matthew Ydarraga	Sr
DT	96	Ka'Derrion Mason	Jr
DE	97	Milton Williams	Fr
DE	98	Tristan Allen	Fr
DT	99	Keonatye Garner	Sr

Special teams

Pos.	#	Name	Class
P	18	Will Parker	Sr
K	29	Brady Farlow	Jr
K	34	Bailey Hale	Jr
P	36	Davan Dyer	Sr
LS	40	Kyle Conrad	So
LS	49	Reeves Blankenship	Fr

Head coach

- Skip Holtz (Notre Dame)

Coordinators/assistant coaches

- Blake Baker (Tulane)
  Defensive coordinator, safeties
- Todd Fitch (Ohio Wesleyan)
  Offensive coordinator, wide receivers
- Joe Sloan (East Carolina)
  Assistant coach, inside receivers
- Jeff Burris (Notre Dame)
  Assistant coach, cornerbacks
- Brian Gamble (Texas A&M)
  Assistant coach, linebackers
- Robert McFarland (McNeese State)
  Assistant coach, offensive line
- Rick Petri (Missouri-Rolla)
  Assistant coach, defensive line
- Tim Rattay (Louisiana Tech)
  Assistant coach, quarterbacks
- Tony Ball (Chattanooga)
  Assistant coach, running backs
- Erik Link (Drake)
  Special teams coordinator

Legend

- (C) Team captain
- (S) Suspended
- (I) Ineligible
- Injured
- Redshirt

Roster
Last update: April 20, 2019

== Schedule ==
Date	Time	Opponent	Site	TV	Result	Attendance
September 1	6:00 p.m.	at South Alabama*	Ladd–Peebles Stadium; Mobile, AL	ESPN+	W 30–26	13,457
September 8	6:00 p.m.	Southern*	Joe Aillet Stadium; Ruston, LA	ESPN+	W 54–17	22,926
September 22	6:00 p.m.	at No. 6 LSU*	Tiger Stadium; Baton Rouge, LA	ESPNU	L 21–38	102,321
September 29	6:30 p.m.	at North Texas	Apogee Stadium; Denton, TX	beIN	W 29–27	30,105
October 6	6:00 p.m.	UAB	Joe Aillet Stadium; Ruston, LA	Stadium	L 7–28	18,983
October 13	6:00 p.m.	at UTSA	Alamodome; San Antonio, TX	ESPN+	W 31–3	20,057
October 20	2:30 p.m.	UTEP	Joe Aillet Stadium; Ruston, LA	ESPN+	W 31–24	18,972
October 26	5:30 p.m.	at Florida Atlantic	FAU Stadium; Boca Raton, FL	CBSSN	W 21–13	14,948
November 3	6:30 p.m.	at No. 21 Mississippi State*	Davis Wade Stadium; Starkville, MS	SECN	L 3–45	58,709
November 10	6:00 p.m.	Rice	Joe Aillet Stadium; Ruston, LA	ESPN+	W 28–13	15,283
November 17	2:30 p.m.	at Southern Miss	M. M. Roberts Stadium; Hattiesburg, MS (Rivalry in Dixie)	Stadium	L 20–21	19,142
November 24	11:00 a.m.	Western Kentucky	Joe Aillet Stadium; Ruston, LA	CBSSN	L 15–30	11,459
December 22	9:30 p.m.	at Hawaii*	Aloha Stadium; Honolulu, HI (Hawaii Bowl)	ESPN	W 31–14	30,911
*Non-conference game; Rankings from AP Poll released prior to the game; All times are in Central time

Schedule source:

== Radio ==
Radio coverage for all games will be broadcast statewide on the Louisiana Tech Sports Network by Learfield Sports. The radio announcers are Dave Nitz with play-by-play, Teddy Allen with color commentary, and Nick Brown with sideline reports.

== Game summaries ==
=== At South Alabama ===
Louisiana Tech at South Alabama – Game summary

Quarter	1	2	3	4	Total
Bulldogs	7	13	3	7	30
Jaguars	0	7	6	13	26

at Ladd-Peebles Stadium, Mobile, AL

- Date: September 1
- Game time: 6:00 p.m. CST
- Game weather: 79 °F (26 °C); partly cloudy
- Game attendance: 13,457
- Referee: Steve LaMantia
- TV: ESPN+

Game information

First quarter

- LT - Jaqwis Dancy 8-yard TD run, Bailey Hale kick good, 8:41 (LT 7-0)

Second quarter

- LT - Dancy 1-yard TD run, Hale kick no good, 13:18 (LT 13-0)
- USA - Kawaan Baker 28-yard TD run, Gavin Patterson kick good, 7:54 (LT 13-7)
- LT - Bobby Holly 1-yard TD pass from J'Mar Smith, Hale kick good, 0:34 (LT 20-7)

Third quarter

- LT - Hale 23-yard field goal, 11:42 (LT 23-7)
- USA - Baker 3-yard TD pass from Cole Garvin, two-point conversion attempt no good, 6:59 (LT 23-13)

Fourth quarter

- USA - Maurice Mayo 5-yard TD run, Patterson kick good, 8:18 (LT 23-20)
- LT - Adrian Hardy 8-yard TD pass from Smith, Hale kick good, 2:19 (LT 30-20)
- USA - Baker 4-yard TD run, Patterson kick no good, 1:11 (LT 30-26)

Top passers

- LT - J'Mar Smith - 19/29, 209 yards, 2 TD, 3 INT
- USA - Cole Garvin - 7/16, 47 yards, TD, 2 INT

Top rushers

- LT - Jaqwis Dancy - 15 carries, 144 yards, 2 TD
- USA - Evan Orth - 2 carries, 74 yards

Top receivers

- LT - Adrian Hardy - 3 receptions, 73 yards, TD
- USA - Jamarius Way - 2 receptions, 31 yards

=== Southern ===
Southern at Louisiana Tech – Game summary

Quarter	1	2	3	4	Total
Jaguars	7	7	3	0	17
Bulldogs	21	10	14	9	54

at Joe Aillet Stadium, Ruston, LA

- Date: September 8
- Game time: 6:00 p.m. CST
- Game weather: 82 °F (28 °C); cloudy
- Game attendance: 22,926
- Referee: Justin Elliott
- TV: ESPN+

Game information

First quarter

- LT - Israel Tucker 1-yard TD run, Bailey Hale kick good, 11:41 (LT 7-0)
- LT - Jaqwis Dancy 25-yard TD run, Hale kick good, 10:05 (LT 14-0)
- LT - J'Mar Smith 19-yard TD run, Hale kick good, 5:22 (LT 21-0)
- SOU - Kendall Catalon 38-yard TD pass from John Lampley, Cesar Barajas kick good, 1:24 (LT 21-7)

Second quarter

- SOU - Lampley 1-yard TD run, Barajas kick good, 10:59 (LT 21-14)
- LT - Rhashid Bonnette 17-yard TD pass from Smith, Hale kick good, 9:02 (LT 28-14)
- LT - Hale 24-yard field goal, 0:05 (LT 31-14)

Third quarter

- SOU - Barajas 22-yard field goal, 8:15 (LT 31-17)
- LT - Dancy 32-yard TD run, Hale kick good, 7:12 (LT 38-17)
- LT - Smoke Harris 34-yard TD pass from Smith, Hale kick good, 0:00 (LT 45-17)

Fourth quarter

- LT - Team safety, 5:30 (LT 47-17)
- LT - Harris 30-yard TD pass from Aaron Allen, Hale kick good, 0:06 (LT 54-17)

Top passers

- LT - J'Mar Smith - 24/37, 380 yards, 2 TD
- SOU - John Lampley - 17/24, 179 yards, TD

Top rushers

- LT - Jaqwis Dancy - 5 carries, 67 yards, 2 TD
- SOU - Devon Benn - 15 carries, 53 yards

Top receivers

- LT - Adrian Hardy - 6 receptions, 111 yards
- SOU - Kendall Catalon - 6 receptions, 89 yards, TD

=== At LSU ===
Louisiana Tech at LSU – Game summary

Quarter	1	2	3	4	Total
Bulldogs	0	7	7	7	21
No. 6 Tigers	7	17	0	14	38

at Tiger Stadium, Baton Rouge, LA

- Date: September 22
- Game time: 6:00 p.m. CST
- Game weather: 78 °F (26 °C); light rain
- Game attendance: 102,321
- TV: ESPNU

Game information

First quarter

- LSU - Nick Brossette 1-yard TD run, Cole Tracy kick good, 9:20 (LSU 7-0)

Second quarter

- LSU - Brossette 1-yard TD run, Tracy kick good, 14:57 (LSU 14-0)
- LSU - Tracy 24-yard field goal, 9:17 (LSU 17-0)
- LSU - Clyde Edwards-Helaire 28-yard TD run, Tracy kick good, 8:22 (LSU 24-0)
- LT - Adrian Hardy 20-yard TD pass from J'Mar Smith, Bailey Hale kick good, 4:23 (LSU 24-7)

Third quarter

- LT - Bobby Holly 1-yard TD pass from Smith, Hale kick good, 9:10 (LSU 24-14)

Fourth quarter

- LT - Hardy 42-yard TD pass from Smith, Hale kick good, 12:57 (LSU 24-21)
- LSU - Brossette 2-yard TD run, Tracy kick good, 8:06 (LSU 31-21)
- LSU - Edwards-Helaire 1-yard TD run, Tracy kick good, 2:23 (LSU 38-21)

Top passers

- LSU - Joe Burrow - 16/28, 191 yards
- LT - J'Mar Smith - 27/50, 330 yards, 3 TD, INT

Top rushers

- LSU - Clyde Edwards-Helaire - 20 carries, 136 yards, 2 TD
- LT - Jaqwis Dancy - 7 carries, 31 yards

Top receivers

- LSU - Dee Anderson - 5 receptions, 80 yards
- LT - Adrian Hardy - 10 receptions, 181 yards, 2 TD

=== At North Texas ===
Louisiana Tech at North Texas – Game summary

Quarter	1	2	3	4	Total
Bulldogs	6	20	3	0	29
Mean Green	21	0	6	0	27

at Apogee Stadium, Denton, TX

- Date: September 29
- Game time: 6:30 p.m. CST
- Game weather: 75 °F (24 °C); overcast
- Game attendance: 30,105
- TV: beIN Sports

Game information

First quarter

- UNT - Michael Lawrence 36-yard TD pass from Mason Fine, Cole Hedlund kick good, 11:57 (UNT 7-0)
- LT - Bailey Hale 28-yard field goal, 10:25 (UNT 7-3)
- UNT - Rico Bussey Jr. 9-yard TD pass from Fine, Hedlund kick good, 4:24 (UNT 14-3)
- LT - Hale 37-yard field goal, 3:04 (UNT 14-6)
- UNT - Loren Easly 9-yard TD run, Hedlund kick good, 1:28 (UNT 21-6)

Second quarter

- LT - Hale 22-yard field goal, 9:30 (UNT 21-9)
- LT - Adrian Hardy 8-yard TD pass from J'Mar Smith, Hale kick good, 4:30 (UNT 21-16)
- LT - Hale 28-yard field goal, 1:30 (UNT 21-19)
- LT - Alfred Smith 5-yard TD pass from J. Smith, Hale kick good, 0:32 (LT 26-21)

Third quarter

- LT - Hale 42-yard field goal, 7:08 (LT 29-21)
- UNT - Bussey Jr. 7-yard TD pass from Fine, two-point conversion no good, 1:57 (LT 29-27)

Top passers

- LT - J'Mar Smith - 20/39, 230 yards, 2 TD
- UNT - Mason Fine - 22/35, 296 yards, 3 TD

Top rushers

- LT - Israel Tucker - 15 carries, 95 yards
- UNT - Loren Easly - 22 carries, 110 yards, TD

Top receivers

- LT - Rhashid Bonnette - 5 receptions, 101 yards
- UNT - Rico Bussey Jr. - 9 receptions, 112 yards, 2 TD

=== UAB ===
UAB at Louisiana Tech – Game summary

Quarter	1	2	3	4	Total
Blazers	0	7	7	14	28
Bulldogs	7	0	0	0	7

at Joe Aillet Stadium, Ruston, LA

- Date: October 6
- Game time: 6:30 p.m. CST
- Game weather: 78 °F (26 °C); scattered thunderstorms
- Game attendance: 18,983
- TV: Stadium

Game information

First quarter

- LT - Kam McKnight 5-yard TD run, Bailey Hale kick good, 13:24 (LT 7-0)

Second quarter

- UAB - Xavier Ubosi 40-yard TD pass from A. J. Erdely, Nick Vogel kick good, 10:26 (TIE 7-7)

Third quarter

- UAB - Spencer Brown 1-yard TD run, Vogel kick good, 7:18 (UAB 14-7)

Fourth quarter

- UAB - Brown 26-yard TD run, Vogel kick good, 8:08 (UAB 21-7)
- UAB - Erdely 38-yard TD run, Vogel kick good, 4:35 (UAB 28-7)

Top passers

- UAB - A. J. Erdely - 8/24, 136 yards, TD, INT
- LT - J'Mar Smith - 10/24, 109 yards, INT

Top rushers

- UAB - Spencer Brown - 20 carries, 90 yards, 2 TD
- LT - Kam McKnight - 15 carries, 80 yards, TD

Top receivers

- UAB - Xavier Ubosi - 2 receptions, 50 yards, TD
- LT - Teddy Veal - 6 receptions, 66 yards

=== At UTSA ===
Louisiana Tech at UTSA – Game summary

Quarter	1	2	3	4	Total
Bulldogs	7	10	7	7	31
Roadrunners	0	0	3	0	3

at Alamodome, San Antonio, TX

- Date: October 13
- Game time: 6:00 p.m. CST
- Game weather: 72 °F (22 °C); none (domed stadium)
- Game attendance: 20,057
- TV: ESPN+

Game information

First quarter

- LT - Kam McKnight 2-yard TD run, Bailey Hale kick good, 11:22 (LT 7-0)

Second quarter

- LT - Hale 46-yard field goal, 14:14 (LT 10-0)
- LT - Jaqwis Dancy 2-yard TD run, Hale kick good, 1:31 (LT 17-0)

Third quarter

- LT - George Scott 67-yard TD pass from J'Mar Smith, Hale kick good, 5:43 (LT 24-0)
- UTSA - Jared Sackett 29-yard field goal, 1:41 (LT 24-3)

Fourth quarter

- LT - McKnight 7-yard TD run, Hale kick good, 1:00 (LT 31-3)

Top passers

- LT - J'Mar Smith - 25/36, 309 yards, TD, INT
- UTSA - Cordale Grundy - 17/38, 191 yards, INT

Top rushers

- LT - Kam McKnight - 10 carries, 42 yards, 2 TD
- UTSA - Cordale Grundy - 11 carries, 60 yards

Top receivers

- LT - George Scott - 2 receptions, 88 yards, TD
- UTSA - Blaze Moorhead - 6 receptions, 87 yards

=== UTEP ===
UTEP at Louisiana Tech – Game summary

Quarter	1	2	3	4	Total
Miners	7	0	14	3	24
Bulldogs	14	3	7	7	31

at Joe Aillet Stadium, Ruston, LA

- Date: October 20
- Game time: 2:30 p.m. CST
- Game weather: 64 °F (18 °C); partly cloudy
- Game attendance: 18,972
- TV: ESPN+

Game information

First quarter

- LT - L'Jarius Sneed 12-yard interception returned for TD, Bailey Hale kick good, 8:00 (LT 7-0)
- UTEP - Keynan Foster 25-yard TD pass from Ryan Metz, Jason Filley kick good, 5:55 (TIE 7-7)
- LT - Adrian Hardy 19-yard TD pass from J'Mar Smith, Hale kick good, 4:34 (LT 14-7)

Second quarter

- LT - Hale 19-yard field goal, 0:00 (LT 17-7)

Third quarter

- UTEP - Brandon Jones 6-yard TD run, Filley kick good, 12:30 (LT 17-14)
- LT - McKnight 5-yard TD run, Hale kick good, 7:16 (LT 24-14)
- UTEP - Jones 1-yard TD run, Filley kick good, 1:32 (LT 24-21)

Fourth quarter

- UTEP - Filley 36-yard field goal, 11:23 (TIE 24-24)
- LT - Smith 43-yard TD run, Hale kick good, 6:32 (LT 31-24)

Top passers

- LT - J'Mar Smith - 17/29, 156 yards, TD
- UTEP - Ryan Metz - 11/17, 164 yards, TD, INT

Top rushers

- LT - Jaqwis Dancy - 12 carries, 93 yards
- UTEP - Ryan Metz - 12 carries, 28 yards

Top receivers

- LT - Teddy Veal - 11 receptions, 103 yards
- UTEP - Keynan Foster - 4 receptions, 84 yards, TD

=== At Florida Atlantic ===
Louisiana Tech at Florida Atlantic – Game summary

Quarter	1	2	3	4	Total
Bulldogs	0	14	0	7	21
Owls	10	0	3	0	13

at FAU Stadium, Boca Raton, FL

- Date: October 26
- Game time: 5:30 p.m. CST
- Game weather: 87 °F (31 °C); mostly cloudy
- Game attendance: 14,948
- TV: CBS Sports Network

Game information

First quarter

- FAU - Devin Singletary 7-yard TD run, Vladimir Rivas kick good, 13:11 (FAU 7-0)
- FAU - Rivas 29-yard field goal, 0:25 (FAU 10-0)

Second quarter

- LT - Jaqwis Dancy 20-yard TD run, Bailey Hale kick good, 2:46 (FAU 10-7)
- LT - Kam McKnight 5-yard TD run, Hale kick good, 0:33 (LT 14-10)

Third quarter

- FAU - Rivas 28-yard field goal, 9:25 (LT 14-13)

Fourth quarter

- LT - Teddy Veal 15-yard TD pass, Hale kick good, 8:27 (LT 21-13)

Top passers

- LT - J'Mar Smith - 17/35, 217 yards, TD
- FAU - Rafe Peavey - 15/26, 115 yards, INT

Top rushers

- LT - Jaqwis Dancy - 24 carries, 116 yards, TD
- FAU - Devin Singletary - 19 carries, 171 yards, TD

Top receivers

- LT - Teddy Veal - 9 receptions, 81 yards, TD
- FAU - Willie Wright - 6 receptions, 68 yards

=== At Mississippi State ===
Louisiana Tech at Mississippi State – Game summary

Quarter	1	2	3	4	Total
(LT) Bulldogs	3	0	0	0	3
No. 18 (MSST) Bulldogs	21	10	7	7	45

at Davis Wade Stadium, Starkville, MS

- Date: November 3
- Game time: 6:30 p.m. CST
- Game weather: 61 °F (16 °C); clear
- Game attendance: 58,709
- TV: SEC Network

Game information

First quarter

- MSST - Stephen Guidry 11-yard TD pass from Nick Fitzgerald, Jace Christmann kick good, 12:38 (MSST 7-0)
- MSST - Deddrick Thomas 36-yard TD pass from Fitzgerald, Christmann kick good, 7:02 (MSST 14-0)
- LT - Bailey Hale 46-yard field goal, 3:15 (MSST 14-3)
- MSST - Kylin Hill 23-yard TD pass from Fitzgerald, Christmann kick good, 0:07 (MSST 21-3)

Second quarter

- MSST - Christmann 47-yard field goal, 5:23 (MSST 24-3)
- MSST - Jesse Jackson 10-yard TD pass from Fitzgerald, Christmann kick good, 0:30 (MSST 31-3)

Third quarter

- MSST - Aeris Williams 29-yard TD run, Christmann kick good, 4:12 (MSST 38-3)

Fourth quarter

- MSST - Keytaon Thompson 19-yard TD run, Christmann kick good, 13:20 (MSST 45-3)

Top passers

- MSST - Nick Fitzgerald - 17/28, 243 yards, 4 TD
- LT - J'Mar Smith - 14/30, 98 yards

Top rushers

- MSST - Nick Fitzgerald - 18 carries, 107 yards
- LT - Kam McKnight - 13 carries, 59 yards

Top receivers

- MSST - Deddrick Thomas - 3 receptions, 70 yards, TD
- LT - Kam McKnight - 2 receptions, 32 yards

=== Rice ===
Rice at Louisiana Tech – Game summary

Quarter	1	2	3	4	Total
Owls	0	3	7	3	13
Bulldogs	0	7	14	7	28

at Joe Aillet Stadium, Ruston, LA

- Date: November 10
- Game time: 6:00 p.m. CST
- Game weather: 41 °F (5 °C); clear
- Game attendance: 15,283
- TV: ESPN+

Game information

First quarter

- RICE - Haden Tobola 42-yard field goal, 14:56 (RICE 3-0)
- LT - Jaqwis Dancy 11-yard TD run, Bailey Hale kick good, 3:02 (LT 7-3)

Second quarter

- RICE - Austin Walter 68-yard TD pass from Shawn Stankavage, Jack Fox kick good, 13:32 (RICE 10-7)
- LT - Dancy 1-yard TD run, Hale kick good, 9:59 (LT 14-10)
- LT - Dancy 18-yard TD run, Hale kick good, 1:13 (LT 21-10)

Fourth quarter

- RICE - Tobola 29-yard field goal, 9:13 (LT 21-13)
- LT - Alfred Smith 10-yard TD pass from J'Mar Smith, Hale kick good, 5:52 (LT 28-13)

Top passers

- LT - J'Mar Smith - 21/34, 314 yards, TD, 2 INT
- RICE - Shawn Stankavage - 18/32, 216 yards, TD, 3 INT

Top rushers

- LT - Jaqwis Dancy - 15 carries, 80 yards, 3 TD
- RICE - Aston Walter - 17 carries, 72 yards

Top receivers

- LT - Adrian Hardy - 10 receptions, 160 yards
- RICE - Aston Walter - 5 receptions, 101 yards, TD

=== At Southern Miss ===
Louisiana Tech at Southern Miss – Game summary

Quarter	1	2	3	4	Total
Bulldogs	7	10	0	3	20
Golden Eagles	7	7	0	7	21

at M. M. Roberts Stadium, Hattiesburg, MS

- Date: November 17
- Game time: 2:30 p.m. CST
- Game weather: 67 °F (19 °C); mostly sunny
- Game attendance: 19,142
- TV: Stadium

Game information

First quarter

- USM - Steven Anderson 1-yard TD run, Briggs Bourgeois kick good, 6:54 (USM 7-0)
- LT - Adrian Hardy 5-yard TD pass from J'Mar Smith, Bailey Hale kick good, 1:28 (TIE 7-7)

Second quarter

- USM - Neil McLaurin 49-yard TD pass from Jack Abraham, Bourgeois kick good, 10:32 (USM 14-7)
- LT - Kam McKnight 6-yard TD run, Hale kick good, 4:39 (TIE 14-14)
- LT - Hale 24-yard field goal, 0:00 (LT 17-14)

Fourth quarter

- LT - Hale 23-yard field goal, 13:40 (LT 20-14)
- USM - Anderson 6-yard TD run, Bourgeois kick good, 6:02 (USM 21-20)

Top passers

- USM - Jack Abraham - 24/29, 195 yards, TD
- LT - J'Mar Smith - 27/43, 243 yards, TD

Top rushers

- USM - Steven Anderson - 12 carries, 29 yards, 2 TD
- LT - Israel Tucker - 9 carries, 24 yards

Top receivers

- USM - Quez Watkins - 9 receptions, 110 yards
- LT - Adrian Hardy - 11 receptions, 110 yards, TD

=== Western Kentucky ===
Western Kentucky at Louisiana Tech – Game summary

Quarter	1	2	3	4	Total
Hilltoppers	14	9	0	7	30
Bulldogs	0	12	3	0	15

at Joe Aillet Stadium, Ruston, LA

- Date: November 24
- Game time: 11:00 a.m. CST
- Game weather: 61 °F (16 °C); clear
- Game attendance: 11,459
- TV: CBS Sports Network

Game information

First quarter

- WKU - Lucky Jackson 18-yard TD run, Alex Rinella kick good, 10:03 (WKU 7-0)
- WKU - Mik'Quan Deane 10-yard TD pass from Steve Duncan, Rinella kick good, 5:01 (WKU 14-0)

Second quarter

- WKU - Team safety, 13:26 (WKU 16-0)
- WKU - D'Andre Ferby 1-yard TD run, Rinella kick good, 12:16 (WKU 23-0)
- LT - Israel Tucker 19-yard TD run, Bailey Hale kick good, 1:43 (WKU 23-7)
- LT - Team safety, 0:31 (WKU 23-9)
- LT - Hale 33-yard field goal, 0:00 (WKU 23-12)

Third quarter

- LT - Hale 20-yard field goal, 11:53 (WKU 23-15)

Fourth quarter

- WKU - Ferby 36-yard TD run, Rinella kick good, 4:27 (WKU 30-15)

Top passers

- WKU - Steve Duncan - 11/22, 92 yards, TD, INT
- LT - J'Mar Smith - 24/44, 280 yards, INT

Top rushers

- WKU - Joshua Samuel - 13 carries, 71 yards
- LT - Israel Tucker - 10 carries, 39 yards, TD

Top receivers

- WKU - Mik'Quan Deane - 2 receptions, 46 yards, TD
- LT - Adrian Hardy - 9 receptions, 125 yards

=== Vs. Hawaii (Hawaii Bowl) ===
Hawaii vs. Louisiana Tech – Game summary

Quarter	1	2	3	4	Total
Rainbow Warriors	0	7	0	7	14
Bulldogs	3	0	21	7	31

at Aloha Stadium, Honolulu, HI

- Date: December 22
- Game time: 9:30 p.m. CST
- Game weather: 79 °F (26 °C); fair
- Game attendance: 30,911
- TV: ESPN

Game information

First quarter

- LT - Bailey Hale 24-yard field goal, 1:08 (LT 3-0)

Second quarter

- HAW - Jason-Matthew Sharsh 24-yard TD pass from Chevan Cordeiro, Ryan Meskell kick good, 8:20 (HAW 7-3)

Third quarter

- LT - Israel Tucker 5-yard TD run, Hale kick good, 10:27 (LT 10-7)
- LT - Jaqwis Dancy 58-yard TD pass from J'Mar Smith, Hale kick good, 4:44 (LT 17-7)
- LT - Smith 4-yard TD run, Hale kick good, 0:55 (LT 24-7)

Fourth quarter

- HAW - Marcus Armstrong-Brown 7-yard TD pass from Cole McDonald, Meskell kick good, 6:14 (LT 24-14)
- LT - Kam McKnight 39-yard TD run, Hale kick good, 3:45 (LT 31-14)

Top passers

- LT - J'Mar Smith - 19/31, 285 yards, TD, INT
- HAW - Cole McDonald - 10/20, 85 yards, TD, 2 INT

Top rushers

- LT - Jaqwis Dancy - 15 carries, 57 yards
- HAW - Fred Holly III - 9 carries, 57 yards

Top receivers

- LT - Teddy Veal - 8 receptions, 107 yards
- HAW - Jason-Matthew Sharsh - 5 receptions, 67 yards, TD

== Players drafted into the NFL ==
Round	Pick	Player	Position	NFL Club
3	85	Jaylon Ferguson	DE	Baltimore Ravens
