= 2018 UAB Blazers football team =

American college football season

2018 UAB Blazers football

C-USA champion C-USA West Division champion Boca Raton Bowl champion

C-USA Championship Game, W 27–25 vs. Middle Tennessee

Boca Raton Bowl, W 37–13 vs. Northern Illinois
- Conference: Conference USA
- West Division
- Record: 11–3 (7–1 C-USA)
- Head coach: Bill Clark (3rd season)
- Offensive coordinator: Bryant Vincent (2nd season)
- Offensive scheme: Spread option
- Defensive coordinator: David Reeves (2nd season)
- Base defense: 3–3–5
- Home stadium: Legion Field

2018 Conference USA football standings
	Conf.			Overall
Team	W		L	W		L
East Division
Middle Tennessee x	7	–	1	8	–	6
FIU	6	–	2	9	–	4
Marshall	6	–	2	9	–	4
Charlotte	4	–	4	5	–	7
Florida Atlantic	3	–	5	5	–	7
Old Dominion	2	–	6	4	–	8
Western Kentucky	2	–	6	3	–	9
West Division
UAB x$	7	–	1	11	–	3
North Texas	5	–	3	9	–	4
Louisiana Tech	5	–	3	8	–	5
Southern Miss	5	–	3	6	–	5
UTSA	2	–	6	3	–	9
UTEP	1	–	7	1	–	11
Rice	1	–	7	2	–	11
Championship: UAB 27, Middle Tennessee 25
$ – Conference champion; x – Division champion/co-champions

The 2018 UAB Blazers football team represented the University of Alabama at Birmingham (UAB) as a member of the West Division in Conference USA (C-USA) during the 2018 NCAA Division I FBS football season. Led by third-year head coach Bill Clark, the Blazers compiled an overall record of 11–3 with a mark of 7–1 in conference play, winning C-USA's West Division title. UAB advanced to the C-USA Championship Game, where the Blazers defeated Middle Tennessee to capture the program's first conference championship. They were then invited to the Boca Raton Bowl, defeating Northern Illinois to claim the first bowl game victory in program history. The team played home games at Legion Field in Birmingham, Alabama.

On November 11, the Blazers made their first appearance in the Coaches Poll at No. 25, marking the first time since 2004 they were ranked in any of the major polls.

== Schedule ==
Date	Time	Opponent	Site	TV	Result	Attendance
August 30	7:00 p.m.	Savannah State*	Legion Field; Birmingham, AL	ESPN+	W 52–0	27,124
September 8	6:00 p.m.	at Coastal Carolina*	Brooks Stadium; Conway, SC	ESPN+	L 24–47	9,776
September 15	12:00 p.m.	Tulane*	Legion Field; Birmingham, AL	Stadium	W 31–24	21,991
September 29	6:00 p.m.	Charlotte	Legion Field; Birmingham, AL	ESPN3	W 28–7	25,395
October 6	6:00 p.m.	at Louisiana Tech	Joe Aillet Stadium; Ruston, LA	Stadium	W 28–7	18,983
October 13	12:00 p.m.	at Rice	Rice Stadium; Houston, TX	ESPN+	W 42–0	18,916
October 20	6:30 p.m.	North Texas^{†}	Legion Field; Birmingham, AL	beIN	W 29–21	28,014
October 27	6:30 p.m.	at UTEP	Sun Bowl; El Paso, TX	ESPN+	W 19–0	10,787
November 3	6:30 p.m.	UTSA	Legion Field; Birmingham, AL	beIN	W 52–3	17,605
November 10	6:30 p.m.	Southern Miss	Legion Field; Birmingham, AL	beIN	W 26–23 ^{OT}	25,618
November 17	6:00 p.m.	at Texas A&M*	Kyle Field; College Station, TX	ESPN2	L 20–41	97,584
November 24	2:00 p.m.	at Middle Tennessee	Johnny "Red" Floyd Stadium; Murfreesboro, TN	ESPN3	L 3–27	14,411
December 1	1:30 p.m.	at Middle Tennessee	Johnny "Red" Floyd Stadium; Murfreesboro, TN (C-USA Championship Game)	CBSSN	W 27–25	15,806
December 18	6:00 p.m.	vs. Northern Illinois*	FAU Stadium; Boca Raton, FL (Boca Raton Bowl)	ESPN	W 37–13	22,614
*Non-conference game; ^{†}Homecoming; All times are in Central time

== Rankings ==
Ranking movements Legend: ██ Increase in ranking ██ Decrease in ranking — = Not ranked RV = Received votes
	Week															
Poll	Pre	1	2	3	4	5	6	7	8	9	10	11	12	13	14	Final
AP	—	—	—	—	—	—	—	—	RV	RV	RV	RV	RV	—	RV	
Coaches	—	—	—	—	—	—	RV	RV	RV	RV	RV	25	RV	RV	RV	
CFP	Not released									—	—	—	—	—	—	Not released

== Preseason ==
=== Award watch lists ===
Listed in the order that they were released

Award	Player	Position	Year
Rimington Trophy	Lee Dufour	C	JR
Maxwell Award	Spencer Brown	RB	SO
Doak Walker Award	Spencer Brown	RB	SO
John Mackey Award	Logan Scott	TE	SR
Wuerffel Trophy	Craig Kanyangarara	LB	SR
Walter Camp Award	Spencer Brown	RB	SO
Johnny Unitas Golden Arm Award	A.J. Erdely	QB	SR
Manning Award	A.J. Erdely	QB	SR

=== Preseason All-CUSA team ===
Conference USA released their preseason all-CUSA team on July 16, 2018, with the Blazers having one player selected.

Offense

Spencer Brown – RB

=== Preseason media poll ===
Conference USA released their preseason media poll on July 17, 2018, with the Blazers predicted to finish in third place in the West Division.

== Game summaries ==
=== Savannah State ===
	1	2	3	4	Total
Tigers	0	0	0	0	0
Blazers	7	21	10	14	52

=== At Coastal Carolina ===
	1	2	3	4	Total
Blazers	14	10	0	0	24
Chanticleers	7	13	7	20	47

=== Tulane ===
	1	2	3	4	Total
Green Wave	0	7	14	3	24
Blazers	7	14	3	7	31

=== Charlotte ===
	1	2	3	4	Total
49ers	0	0	0	7	7
Blazers	14	7	0	7	28

=== At Louisiana Tech ===
	1	2	3	4	Total
Blazers	0	7	7	14	28
Bulldogs	7	0	0	0	7

=== At Rice ===
	1	2	3	4	Total
Blazers	14	14	14	0	42
Owls	0	0	0	0	0

=== North Texas ===
	1	2	3	4	Total
Mean Green	7	14	0	0	21
Blazers	3	7	9	10	29

=== At UTEP ===
	1	2	3	4	Total
Blazers	10	0	2	7	19
Miners	0	0	0	0	0

=== UTSA ===
	1	2	3	4	Total
Roadrunners	3	0	0	0	3
Blazers	21	17	7	7	52

=== Southern Miss ===
	1	2	3	4	OT	Total
Golden Eagles	7	6	0	7	3	23
Blazers	0	7	13	0	6	26

=== At Texas A&M ===
	1	2	3	4	Total
Blazers	7	0	0	13	20
Aggies	14	10	10	7	41

=== At Middle Tennessee ===
	1	2	3	4	Total
Blazers	3	0	0	0	3
Blue Raiders	0	13	7	7	27

=== At Middle Tennessee (C-USA Championship game) ===
	1	2	3	4	Total
Blazers	3	21	0	3	27
Blue Raiders	13	3	6	3	25

=== Vs. Northern Illinois (Boca Raton Bowl) ===
	1	2	3	4	Total
Huskies	7	3	3	0	13
Blazers	10	17	10	0	37
