= Larry Dick =

American football player (1955–2019)

No. 12
- Position: Quarterback

Personal information
- Born: March 22, 1955
- Died: May 2, 2019 (aged 64)
- Listed height: 6 ft 2 in (1.88 m)
- Listed weight: 195 lb (88 kg)

Career information
- High school: Parkdale (Riverdale Park, Maryland)
- College: Maryland (1973–1977)

Career history
- 1978–1979: Saskatchewan Roughriders

Lawrence Edward Dickson (March 22, 1955 – May 2, 2019), known as Larry Dick, was an American professional football quarterback who played two seasons with the Saskatchewan Roughriders of the Canadian Football League (CFL). He played college football at the University of Maryland, College Park.

== Early life ==
Lawrence Edward Dickson was born on March 22, 1955. He played high school football at Parkdale High School in Riverdale Park, Maryland. Parkdale went 29–0–1 during Dick's time there.

== College career ==
Dick played college football for the Maryland Terrapins of the University of Maryland, College Park. He was on the junior varsity team in 1973 and was redshirted in 1974. He began the 1975 season as the backup to Mark Manges but became the starter after Manges suffered an injury. Overall in 1975, Dick completed 90 of 158 passes (57.0%) for 1,190 yards, eight touchdowns, and two interceptions. He had a 7–1–1 record as a starter that year, including a victory in the 1975 Gator Bowl. Dick and Manges competed for the starting quarterback job during training camp in 1976. Manges was officially named the starter after Dick suffered an elbow injury before the start of the season. Dick only attempted 13 passes in 1976, missing most of the season due to his elbow injury. As a senior in 1977, Dick began the season as the backup to Manges but became the starter again after Manges suffered an injury. Dick completed 83 of 135 passes (61.5%) for 1,351 yards, five touchdowns, and 12 interceptions during the 1977 season. He majored in business administration at Maryland.

== Professional career ==
Dick signed with the Saskatchewan Roughriders of the Canadian Football League on April 5, 1978. He was the backup to Ron Lancaster during the 1978 season but did end up starting the final two games. Overall, Dick dressed in all 16 games for the Roughriders that year, recording 56 completions on 113 passing attempts (49.6%) for 918 yards, four touchdowns, and four interceptions. He re-signed with Saskatchewan on March 8, 1979. He was the backup to Tom Clements through the first seven games of the 1979 season. However, after Clements was traded, Dick started the Roughriders' eighth game of the season but suffered a season-ending knee injury during the contest. Overall, Dick dressed in eight games in 1979, completing 39 of 68 passes (57.4%) for 523 yards, one touchdown, and five interceptions. He was waived by the Roughriders in May 1980.

== Personal life ==
Dick worked in the insurance industry after his football career. He died on May 2, 2019.
