= 2018 Marshall Thundering Herd football team =

American college football season

2018 Marshall Thundering Herd football

Gasparilla Bowl champion

Gasparilla Bowl, W 38–20 vs. South Florida
- Conference: Conference USA
- East Division
- Record: 9–4 (6–2 C-USA)
- Head coach: Doc Holliday (9th season)
- Offensive coordinator: Tim Cramsey (1st season)
- Offensive scheme: Pro spread
- Defensive coordinator: Adam Fuller (1st season)
- Base defense: 4–3
- Home stadium: Joan C. Edwards Stadium

2018 Conference USA football standings
	Conf.			Overall
Team	W		L	W		L
East Division
Middle Tennessee x	7	–	1	8	–	6
FIU	6	–	2	9	–	4
Marshall	6	–	2	9	–	4
Charlotte	4	–	4	5	–	7
Florida Atlantic	3	–	5	5	–	7
Old Dominion	2	–	6	4	–	8
Western Kentucky	2	–	6	3	–	9
West Division
UAB x$	7	–	1	11	–	3
North Texas	5	–	3	9	–	4
Louisiana Tech	5	–	3	8	–	5
Southern Miss	5	–	3	6	–	5
UTSA	2	–	6	3	–	9
UTEP	1	–	7	1	–	11
Rice	1	–	7	2	–	11
Championship: UAB 27, Middle Tennessee 25
$ – Conference champion; x – Division champion/co-champions

The 2018 Marshall Thundering Herd football team represented Marshall University in the 2018 NCAA Division I FBS football season. The Thundering Herd played their home games at the Joan C. Edwards Stadium in Huntington, West Virginia, and competed in the East Division of Conference USA (C-USA). They were led by ninth-year head coach Doc Holliday. They finished the season 9–4, 6–2 in C-USA play to finish in a tie for second place in the East Division. They were invited to the Gasparilla Bowl where they defeated South Florida.

== Preseason ==
=== Award watch lists ===
Listed in the order that they were released

Award	Player	Position	Year
Rimington Trophy	Levi Brown	C	JR
Fred Biletnikoff Award	Tyre Brady	WR	SR
Butkus Award	Juwon Young	LB	JR
Jim Thorpe Award	Malik Gant	S	JR
Bronko Nagurski Trophy	Ryan Bee	DL	JR
Outland Trophy	Ryan Bee	DL	JR
Paul Hornung Award	Keion Davis	RB/KR	JR
Wuerffel Trophy	Chase Hancock	LB	SR
Johnny Unitas Golden Arm Award	Alex Thomson	QB	JR

=== Preseason All-CUSA team ===
Conference USA released their preseason all-CUSA team on July 16, 2018, with the Thundering Herd having five players selected.

Offense

Levi Brown – OL

Tyre Brady – WR

Defense

Chase Hancock – LB

Malik Gant – DB

Special teams

Matt Beardall – LS

=== Preseason media poll ===
Conference USA released their preseason media poll on July 17, 2018, with the Thundering Herd predicted to finish in second place in the East Division.

== Schedule ==
Marshall announced its 2018 football schedule on January 23, 2018. The 2018 schedule consisted of 6 home and away games in the regular season. The Thundering Herd would host CUSA foes Middle Tennessee, Florida Atlantic, Charlotte, and UTSA, and would travel to Western Kentucky (WKU), Old Dominion, Southern Miss, and FIU.

The Thundering Herd would host two of the four non-conference opponents, Eastern Kentucky of the Ohio Valley Conference at the FCS level and NC State of the Atlantic Coast Conference, and would travel to Miami of Ohio of the Mid-American Conference and South Carolina of the Southeastern Conference.

Date	Time	Opponent	Site	TV	Result	Attendance
September 1	3:30 p.m.	at Miami (OH)*	Yager Stadium; Oxford, OH	ESPN+	W 35–28	15,827
September 8	6:30 p.m.	Eastern Kentucky*	Joan C. Edwards Stadium; Huntington, WV	ESPN+	W 32–16	24,304
September 22	7:00 p.m.	NC State*	Joan C. Edwards Stadium; Huntington, WV	CBSSN	L 20–37	32,349
September 29	7:30 p.m.	at Western Kentucky	Houchens Industries–L. T. Smith Stadium; Bowling Green, KY	Stadium	W 20–17	20,811
October 5	7:30 p.m.	Middle Tennessee	Joan C. Edwards Stadium; Huntington, WV	CBSSN	L 24–34	25,979
October 13	3:30 p.m.	at Old Dominion	Foreman Field; Norfolk, VA	Stadium	W 42–20	20,118
October 20	2:30 p.m.	Florida Atlantic^{†}	Joan C. Edwards Stadium; Huntington, WV	CBSSN	W 31–7	23,825
November 3	3:00 p.m.	at Southern Miss	M. M. Roberts Stadium; Hattiesburg, MS	Stadium	L 24–26	20,375
November 10	2:30 p.m.	Charlotte	Joan C. Edwards Stadium; Huntington, WV	ESPN+	W 30–13	19,418
November 17	2:30 p.m.	UTSA	Joan C. Edwards Stadium; Huntington, WV	Stadium	W 23–0	18,502
November 24	12:00 p.m.	at FIU	Riccardo Silva Stadium; Miami, FL	Stadium	W 28–25	14,862
December 1 (Note: The game between Marshall and South Carolina, originally scheduled for September 15, 2018, was canceled in anticipation of Hurricane Florence. Seeking bowl eligibility, Virginia Tech scheduled Marshall, as both teams had a game cancelled due to the hurricane and neither had made their respective conference championship games. The game was contingent upon the Hokies defeating rival Virginia, which they did.)	12:00 p.m.	at Virginia Tech*	Lane Stadium; Blacksburg, VA	ESPN3	L 20–41	31,336
December 20	8:00 p.m.	at South Florida*	Raymond James Stadium; Tampa, FL (Gasparilla Bowl)	ESPN	W 38–20	14,135
*Non-conference game; ^{†}Homecoming; Rankings from AP Poll released prior to the game; All times are in Eastern time

Schedule source:

== Game summaries ==
=== At Miami (OH) ===
	1	2	3	4	Total
Thundering Herd	14	7	7	7	35
RedHawks	0	7	7	14	28

=== Eastern Kentucky ===
	1	2	3	4	Total
Colonels	0	6	7	3	16
Thundering Herd	13	7	7	5	32

=== NC State ===
	1	2	3	4	Total
Wolfpack	3	20	14	0	37
Thundering Herd	0	7	13	0	20

=== At Western Kentucky ===
	1	2	3	4	Total
Thundering Herd	7	3	0	10	20
Hilltoppers	3	7	0	7	17

=== Middle Tennessee ===
	1	2	3	4	Total
Blue Raiders	3	7	14	10	34
Thundering Herd	3	14	0	7	24

=== At Old Dominion ===
	1	2	3	4	Total
Thundering Herd	0	14	7	21	42
Monarchs	0	3	7	10	20

=== Florida Atlantic ===
	1	2	3	4	Total
Owls	0	7	0	0	7
Thundering Herd	0	10	14	7	31

=== At Southern Miss ===
	1	2	3	4	Total
Thundering Herd	3	7	7	7	24
Golden Eagles	3	14	3	6	26

=== Charlotte ===
	1	2	3	4	Total
49ers	7	3	3	0	13
Thundering Herd	10	3	17	0	30

=== UTSA ===
	1	2	3	4	Total
Roadrunners	0	0	0	0	0
Thundering Herd	10	10	3	0	23

=== At FIU ===
	1	2	3	4	Total
Thundering Herd	14	0	7	7	28
Panthers	7	3	0	15	25

=== At Virginia Tech ===
	1	2	3	4	Total
Thundering Herd	6	0	0	14	20
Hokies	10	21	3	7	41

=== At South Florida (Gasparilla Bowl) ===
	1	2	3	4	Total
Thundering Herd	21	7	3	7	38
Bulls	7	3	10	0	20
