= 2018 FIU Panthers football team =

American college football season

2018 FIU Panthers football

Bahamas Bowl champion

Bahamas Bowl, W 35–32 vs. Toledo
- Conference: Conference USA
- East Division
- Record: 9–4 (6–2 C-USA)
- Head coach: Butch Davis (2nd season)
- Offensive coordinator: Rich Skrosky (2nd season)
- Offensive scheme: Multiple
- Defensive coordinator: Brent Guy (2nd season)
- Base defense: 4–3
- Home stadium: Riccardo Silva Stadium

2018 Conference USA football standings
	Conf.			Overall
Team	W		L	W		L
East Division
Middle Tennessee x	7	–	1	8	–	6
FIU	6	–	2	9	–	4
Marshall	6	–	2	9	–	4
Charlotte	4	–	4	5	–	7
Florida Atlantic	3	–	5	5	–	7
Old Dominion	2	–	6	4	–	8
Western Kentucky	2	–	6	3	–	9
West Division
UAB x$	7	–	1	11	–	3
North Texas	5	–	3	9	–	4
Louisiana Tech	5	–	3	8	–	5
Southern Miss	5	–	3	6	–	5
UTSA	2	–	6	3	–	9
UTEP	1	–	7	1	–	11
Rice	1	–	7	2	–	11
Championship: UAB 27, Middle Tennessee 25
$ – Conference champion; x – Division champion/co-champions

The 2018 FIU Panthers football team represented Florida International University in the 2018 NCAA Division I FBS football season. The Panthers played their home games at the Riccardo Silva Stadium in University Park, Florida as members of the East Division of Conference USA (C–USA). They were led by second-year head coach Butch Davis. They finished the season 9–4, 6–2 in C-USA play to finish in a tie for second place in the East Division. They were invited to the Bahamas Bowl where they defeated Toledo.

== Spring Game ==
The 2018 Spring Game took place in University Park, on April 6, at 7 p.m.

Date	Time	Spring Game	Site	TV	Result	Attendance
April 6	7:00 p.m.	Offense vs. Defense	Riccardo Silva Stadium • University Park, Florida	CUSA.tv	Offense 14–13	-

== Offseason ==
Following the conclusion of the 2017 season, several Panthers were invited to participate in the Tropical Bowl, a postseason all star game held on January 14, 2018. Invitations include: Brad Muhammad (DB), Pharoah Mckever (TE) and Anthony Wint (LB).

=== Departures ===
Notable departures from the 2017 squad included:

Name	Number	Pos.	Height	Weight	Year	Hometown	Notes
Alex McGough	#12	QB	6'3"	218	Senior	Tampa, FL	Graduated
Anthony Wint	#53	LB	6'0"	224	Senior	Homestead, FL	Graduated

=== 2018 NFL draft ===
Panthers who were picked in the 2018 NFL Draft:

Round	Pick	Player	Position	Team
7	220	Alex McGough	QB	Seattle Seahawks
UFA		Anthony Wint	LB	New York Jets

=== Award watch lists ===
Listed in the order that they were released

Award	Player	Position	Year
Lou Groza Award	José Borregales	K	SO
Johnny Unitas Golden Arm Award	James Morgan	QB	JR

=== Preseason All-CUSA team ===
Conference USA released their preseason all-CUSA team on July 16, 2018 with the Panthers having two players selected.

Offense

Jordan Budwig – OL

Defense

Fermin Silva – DL

=== Preseason media poll ===
Conference USA released their preseason media poll on July 17, 2018, with the Panthers predicted to finish in fourth place in the East Division.

== Schedule ==
Date	Time	Opponent	Site	TV	Result	Attendance
September 1	7:00 p.m.	Indiana*	Riccardo Silva Stadium; Miami, FL	CBSSN	L 28–38	17,082
September 8	7:30 p.m.	at Old Dominion	Foreman Field; Norfolk, VA	beIN	W 28–20	19,243
September 15	7:30 p.m.	UMass*	Riccardo Silva Stadium; Miami, FL	beIN	W 63–24	14,695
September 22	3:30 p.m.	at No. 21 Miami (FL)*	Hard Rock Stadium; Miami Gardens, FL	ESPN2	L 17–31	59,814
September 29	7:30 p.m.	Arkansas–Pine Bluff*	Riccardo Silva Stadium; Miami, FL	ESPN+	W 55–9	14,937
October 13	7:30 p.m.	Middle Tennessee^{†}	Riccardo Silva Stadium; Miami, FL	beIN	W 24–21	16,002
October 20	7:30 p.m.	Rice	Riccardo Silva Stadium; Miami, FL	ESPN+	W 36–17	13,741
October 27	7:30 p.m.	at Western Kentucky	Houchens Industries–L. T. Smith Stadium; Bowling Green, KY	beIN	W 38–17	15,138
November 3	7:30 p.m.	Florida Atlantic	Riccardo Silva Stadium; Miami, FL (Shula Bowl)	Stadium	L 14–49	18,478
November 10	7:00 p.m.	at UTSA	Alamodome; San Antonio, TX	ESPN+	W 45–7	16,874
November 17	2:00 p.m.	at Charlotte	Jerry Richardson Stadium; Charlotte, NC	ESPN3	W 42–35	13,371
November 24	12:00 p.m.	Marshall	Riccardo Silva Stadium; Miami, FL	Stadium	L 25–28	14,862
December 21	12:30 p.m.	vs. Toledo*	Thomas Robinson Stadium; Nassau, Bahamas (Bahamas Bowl)	ESPN	W 35–32	13,510
*Non-conference game; ^{†}Homecoming; Rankings from AP Poll released prior to the game; All times are in Eastern time

Schedule source:

== Game summaries ==
=== Indiana ===
	1	2	3	4	Total
Hoosiers	14	14	7	3	38
Panthers	7	7	7	7	28

=== At Old Dominion ===
	1	2	3	4	Total
Panthers	0	14	14	0	28
Monarchs	7	13	0	0	20

=== UMass ===
	1	2	3	4	Total
Minutemen	7	3	14	0	24
Panthers	14	28	14	7	63

=== At Miami (FL) ===
	1	2	3	4	Total
Panthers	0	0	0	17	17
No. 21 Hurricanes	7	17	7	0	31

=== Arkansas–Pine Bluff ===
	1	2	3	4	Total
Golden Lions	3	0	3	3	9
Panthers	17	21	17	0	55

=== Middle Tennessee ===
	1	2	3	4	Total
Blue Raiders	0	14	7	0	21
Panthers	3	10	0	11	24

=== Rice ===
	1	2	3	4	Total
Owls	7	3	7	0	17
Panthers	0	16	10	10	36

=== At Western Kentucky ===
	1	2	3	4	Total
Panthers	7	7	14	10	38
Hilltoppers	0	3	0	14	17

=== Florida Atlantic ===
	1	2	3	4	Total
Owls	7	7	7	28	49
Panthers	0	7	7	0	14

=== At UTSA ===
	1	2	3	4	Total
Panthers	0	17	7	21	45
Roadrunners	0	0	0	7	7

=== At Charlotte ===
	1	2	3	4	Total
Panthers	10	10	7	15	42
49ers	7	7	7	14	35

=== Marshall ===
	1	2	3	4	Total
Thundering Herd	14	0	7	7	28
Panthers	3	7	0	15	25

=== Toledo (Bahamas Bowl) ===
	1	2	3	4	Total
Panthers	0	14	7	14	35
Rockets	10	0	7	15	32
