= 2018 Middle Tennessee Blue Raiders football team =

American college football season

2018 Middle Tennessee Blue Raiders football

C-USA East Division champion

C-USA Championship Game, L 25–27 vs. UAB

New Orleans Bowl, L 13–45 vs. Appalachian State
- Conference: Conference USA
- East Division
- Record: 8–6 (7–1 C-USA)
- Head coach: Rick Stockstill (13th season)
- Offensive coordinator: Tony Franklin (3rd season)
- Offensive scheme: Bear raid
- Defensive coordinator: Scott Shafer (2nd season)
- Base defense: Multiple 4–3
- Home stadium: Johnny "Red" Floyd Stadium

2018 Conference USA football standings
	Conf.			Overall
Team	W		L	W		L
East Division
Middle Tennessee x	7	–	1	8	–	6
FIU	6	–	2	9	–	4
Marshall	6	–	2	9	–	4
Charlotte	4	–	4	5	–	7
Florida Atlantic	3	–	5	5	–	7
Old Dominion	2	–	6	4	–	8
Western Kentucky	2	–	6	3	–	9
West Division
UAB x$	7	–	1	11	–	3
North Texas	5	–	3	9	–	4
Louisiana Tech	5	–	3	8	–	5
Southern Miss	5	–	3	6	–	5
UTSA	2	–	6	3	–	9
UTEP	1	–	7	1	–	11
Rice	1	–	7	2	–	11
Championship: UAB 27, Middle Tennessee 25
$ – Conference champion; x – Division champion/co-champions

The 2018 Middle Tennessee Blue Raiders football team represented Middle Tennessee State University as a member of the East Division of Conference USA (C-USA) during the 2018 NCAA Division I FBS football season. Led by 13th-year head coach Rick Stockstill, the Blue Raiders compiled an overall record of 8–6 with a mark of 7–1 in conference play, winning the C-USA's East Division title. Middle Tennessee represented the East Division in the Conference USA Football Championship Game, falling to West Division champion, UAB. The Blue Raiders were invited to the New Orleans Bowl, where they lost to Appalachian State. The team played home games at Johnny "Red" Floyd Stadium in Murfreesboro, Tennessee.

== Preseason ==
=== Award watch lists ===
Listed in the order that they were released

Award	Player	Position	Year
Maxwell Award	Brent Stockstill	QB	SR
Davey O'Brien Award	Brent Stockstill	QB	SR
Doak Walker Award	Tavares Thomas	RB	SR
Fred Biletnikoff Award	Ty Lee	WR	JR
Butkus Award	Darius Harris	LB	SO
Ray Guy Award	Matt Bonadies	P	SR
Wuerffel Trophy	Brent Stockstill	QB	SR
Johnny Unitas Golden Arm Award	Brent Stockstill	QB	SR
Earl Campbell Tyler Rose Award	Tavares Thomas	RB	SR

=== Preseason All-CUSA team ===
Conference USA released their preseason all-CUSA team on July 16, 2018, with the Blue Raiders having four players selected.

Offense

Brent Stockstill – QB

Chandler Brewer – OL

Ty Lee – WR

Defense

Khalil Brooks – LB

=== Preseason media poll ===
Conference USA released their preseason media poll on July 17, 2018, with the Blue Raiders predicted to finish in third place in the East Division.

== Schedule ==
Date	Time	Opponent	Site	TV	Result	Attendance
September 1	6:30 p.m.	at Vanderbilt*	Vanderbilt Stadium; Nashville, TN	SECN	L 7–35	25,348
September 8	6:00 p.m.	UT Martin*	Johnny "Red" Floyd Stadium; Murfreesboro, TN	ESPN+	W 61–37	16,227
September 15	11:00 a.m.	at No. 3 Georgia*	Sanford Stadium; Athens, GA	ESPNews	L 7–49	92,746
September 29	6:00 p.m.	Florida Atlantic	Johnny "Red" Floyd Stadium; Murfreesboro, TN	Stadium	W 25–24	17,299
October 5	6:30 p.m.	at Marshall	Joan C. Edwards Stadium; Huntington, WV	CBSSN	W 34–24	25,979
October 13	6:30 p.m.	at FIU	Riccardo Silva Stadium; Miami, FL	beIN	L 21–24	16,002
October 20	2:00 p.m.	Charlotte	Johnny "Red" Floyd Stadium; Murfreesboro, TN	ESPN3	W 21–13	13,102
October 27	2:30 p.m.	at Old Dominion	Foreman Field; Norfolk, VA	ESPN+	W 51–17	19,725
November 2	7:00 p.m.	Western Kentucky	Johnny "Red" Floyd Stadium; Murfreesboro, TN (100 Miles of Hate)	CBSSN	W 29–10	16,617
November 10	2:00 p.m.	at UTEP	Sun Bowl; El Paso, TX	ESPN+	W 48–32	9,690
November 17	11:00 a.m.	at No. 20 Kentucky*	Kroger Field; Lexington, KY	SECN	L 23–34	47,535
November 24	2:00 p.m.	UAB	Johnny "Red" Floyd Stadium; Murfreesboro, TN	ESPN3	W 27–3	14,411
December 1	1:30 p.m.	UAB	Johnny "Red" Floyd Stadium; Murfreesboro, TN (C-USA Championship Game)	CBSSN	L 25–27	15,806
December 15	8:00 p.m.	vs. Appalachian State*	Mercedes-Benz Superdome; New Orleans, LA (New Orleans Bowl)	ESPN	L 13–45	23,942
*Non-conference game; Rankings from AP Poll released prior to the game; All times are in Central time

== Game summaries ==
=== At Vanderbilt ===
	1	2	3	4	Total
Blue Raiders	7	0	0	0	7
Commodores	7	7	7	14	35

=== UT Martin ===
	1	2	3	4	Total
Skyhawks	7	10	7	13	37
Blue Raiders	14	12	21	14	61

=== At Georgia ===
	1	2	3	4	Total
Blue Raiders	0	7	0	0	7
No. 3 Bulldogs	14	28	7	0	49

=== Florida Atlantic ===
	1	2	3	4	Total
Owls	14	7	3	0	24
Blue Raiders	0	10	7	8	25

=== At Marshall ===
	1	2	3	4	Total
Blue Raiders	3	7	14	10	34
Thundering Herd	3	14	0	7	24

=== At FIU ===
	1	2	3	4	Total
Blue Raiders	0	14	7	0	21
Panthers	3	10	0	11	24

=== Charlotte ===
	1	2	3	4	Total
49ers	6	0	0	7	13
Blue Raiders	0	14	0	7	21

=== At Old Dominion ===
	1	2	3	4	Total
Blue Raiders	17	14	14	6	51
Monarchs	7	3	7	0	17

=== Western Kentucky ===
	1	2	3	4	Total
Hilltoppers	3	0	7	0	10
Blue Raiders	10	10	3	6	29

=== At UTEP ===
	1	2	3	4	Total
Blue Raiders	14	13	7	14	48
Miners	0	10	0	22	32

=== At Kentucky ===
	1	2	3	4	Total
Blue Raiders	0	10	6	7	23
No. 20 Wildcats	17	7	7	3	34

=== UAB ===
	1	2	3	4	Total
Blazers	3	0	0	0	3
Blue Raiders	0	13	7	7	27

=== UAB (C-USA Championship game) ===
	1	2	3	4	Total
Blazers	3	21	0	3	27
Blue Raiders	13	3	6	3	25

=== Vs. Appalachian State (New Orleans Bowl) ===
	1	2	3	4	Total
Mountaineers	0	24	14	7	45
Blue Raiders	3	3	7	0	13
