= List of Utah State Aggies head football coaches =

List of head football coaches for the Utah State Aggies

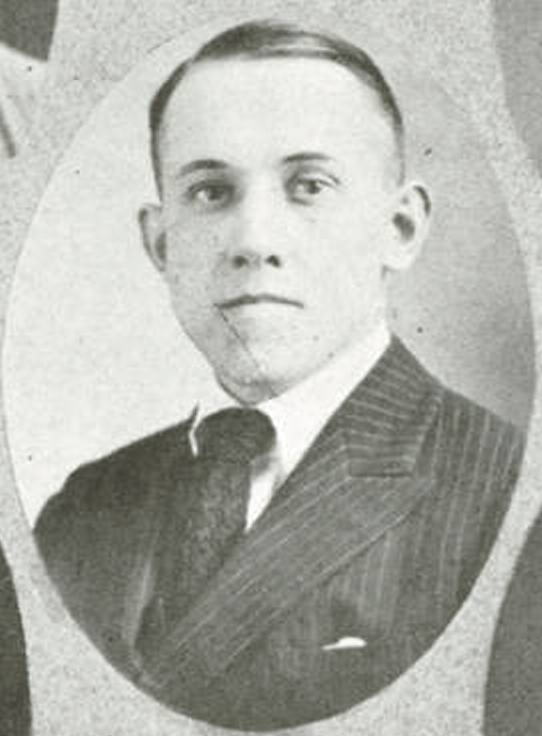
Dick Romney coached in the most seasons and won the most games during his tenure at Utah State.

The Utah State Aggies college football team represents Utah State University in the Pac-12 Conference, as part of the NCAA Division I Football Bowl Subdivision. The program has had 28 head coaches, and 2 interim head coaches, since it began play during the 1892 season. Since December 2024, Bronco Mendenhall has served as head coach of the Aggies.

Nine coaches have led Utah State in postseason bowl games: Dick Romney, John Ralston, Charlie Weatherbie, John L. Smith, Gary Andersen, Matt Wells, Frank Maile, Blake Anderson, and Mendenhall. Seven coaches also won conference championships: Romney captured three as a member of the Rocky Mountain Faculty Athletic Conference; Romney captured one and Ralston two as a member of the Skyline Conference; Snyder captured two as a member of the Pacific Coast Athletic Association; Weatherbie captured one and Smith two as a member of the Big West Conference; Andersen captured one as a member of the Western Athletic Conference; Anderson captured one as a member of the MWC.

Romney is the leader in seasons coached, with 29 years as head coach and games coached (235), won (128). Mysterious Walker has the highest winning percentage at .909. Brent Guy has the lowest winning percentage of those who have coached more than one game, with .191. Of the 27 different head coaches who have led the Aggies, Romney and Ralston have been inducted into the College Football Hall of Fame.

== Key ==
Key to symbols in coaches list
General		Overall		Conference		Postseason (Note: Although the first Rose Bowl Game was played in 1902, it has been continuously played since the 1916 game, and is recognized as the oldest bowl game by the NCAA. "—" indicates any season prior to 1916 when postseason games were not played.)	
No.	Order of coaches (Note: A running total of the number of head coaches, with coaches who served separate tenures being counted only once. Interim head coaches are represented with "Int" and are not counted in the running total. "—" indicates the team played but either without a coach or no coach is on record. "X" indicates an interim year without play.)	GC	Games coached	CW	Conference wins	PW	Postseason wins
DC	Division championships	OW	Overall wins	CL	Conference losses	PL	Postseason losses
CC	Conference championships	OL	Overall losses	CT	Conference ties	PT	Postseason ties
NC	National championships	OT	Overall ties (Note: Overtime rules in college football were introduced in 1996, making ties impossible in the period since.)	C%	Conference winning percentage		
†	Elected to the College Football Hall of Fame	O%	Overall winning percentage (Note: When computing the win–loss percentage, a tie counts as half a win and half a loss.)				

== Coaches ==
List of head football coaches showing season(s) coached, overall records, conference records, postseason records, championships and selected awards (Note: Statistics correct as of the end of the 2025 NCAA Division I FCS football season.)
No.	Name	Year(s)	Season(s)	GC	OW	OL	OT	O%	CW	CL	CT	C%	PW	PL	PT	DC	CC	NC	Awards
1	J. Walter Mayo	1896	1	1	0	1	0	.000	—	—	—	—	—	—	—	—	—	0	—
2	Samuel Dunning	1898	1	1	0	1	0	.000	—	—	—	—	—	—	—	—	—	0	—
3	Willard Langton	1899–1900	2	3	1	2	0	0.333	—	—	—	—	—	—	—	—	—	0	—
4	Dick Richards	1901	1	5	3	2	0	0.600	—	—	—	—	—	—	—	—	—	0	—
5	George P. Campbell	1902–1906	5	30	12	16	2	0.433	—	—	—	—	—	—	—	—	—	0	—
6	Mysterious Walker	1907–1908	2	11	10	1	0	0.909	—	—	—	—	—	—	—	—	—	0	—
7	Clayton Teetzel	1909–1915	7	44	24	18	2	0.568	0	6	0	.000	—	—	—	—	0	0	—
8	Jack Watson	1916–1917	2	15	8	5	2	0.600	4	3	1	0.563	—	—	—	—	0	0	—
9	Dick Romney^{†}	1918–1942; 1944–1948	25, 5	235	128	91	16	0.579	88	71	12	0.550	0	2	0	—	4	0	—
10	George Melinkovich	1949–1950	2	21	5	16	0	0.238	1	8	0	0.111	0	0	0	—	0	0	—
11	John Roning	1951–1954	4	41	18	21	2	0.463	14	15	1	0.483	0	0	0	—	0	0	—
12	Ev Faunce	1955–1958	4	40	15	24	1	0.388	10	17	1	0.375	0	0	0	—	0	0	—
13	John Ralston^{†}	1959–1962	4	43	31	11	1	0.733	13	6	1	0.675	0	2	0	—	2	0	—
14	Tony Knap	1963–1966	4	40	25	14	1	0.638	—	—	—	—	0	0	0	—	—	0	—
15	Chuck Mills	1967–1972	6	62	38	23	1	0.621	—	—	—	—	0	0	0	—	—	0	—
16	Phil Krueger	1973–1975	3	33	21	12	0	0.636	—	—	—	—	0	0	0	—	—	0	—
17	Bruce Snyder	1976–1982	7	77	38	37	2	0.506	18	6	1	0.740	0	0	0	—	2	0	—
18	Chris Pella	1983–1985	3	33	9	24	0	0.273	7	12	0	0.368	0	0	0	—	0	0	—
19	Chuck Shelton	1986–1991	5	66	26	39	1	0.402	25	16	1	0.607	0	0	0	—	0	0	—
20	Charlie Weatherbie	1992–1994	3	34	15	19	0	0.441	11	7	0	0.611	1	0	0	—	1	0	—
21	John L. Smith	1995–1997	3	34	16	18	0	0.471	12	4	0	0.750	0	1	0	—	2	0	—
22	Dave Arslanian	1998–1999	2	22	7	15	—	0.318	5	6	—	0.455	0	0	—	—	0	0	—
23	Mick Dennehy	2000–2004	5	56	19	37	—	0.339	9	9	—	0.500	0	0	—	—	0	0	—
24	Brent Guy	2005–2008	4	47	9	38	—	0.191	8	24	—	0.250	0	0	—	—	0	0	—
25	Gary Andersen	2009–2012; 2019–2020	4, 2	66	33	33	—	0.500	22	18	—	0.550	1	2	—	0	1	0	—
26	Matt Wells	2013–2018	6	78	44	34	—	0.564	30	18	—	0.625	2	2	—	1	0	0	—
Int	Frank Maile (Note: Maile has served as interim head coach on two separate occasions. He first served as interim head coach after the resignation of Matt Wells and led the Aggies to a victory in the 2018 New Mexico Bowl. His second stint as interim head coach came in 2020 after Utah State fired Gary Andersen on November 7, and he served as the team's head coach for the remainder of the season.)	2018; 2020	1, 1	4	2	2	—	0.500	1	2	—	0.333	1	0	—	0	0	0	—
27	Blake Anderson	2021–2023	3	40	23	17	—	0.575	15	9	—	0.625	1	2	—	1	1	0	—
Int	Nate Dreiling (Note: Dreiling served as Utah State's interim head coach for the 2024 season after Blake Anderson was fired in July 2024.)	2024	1	12	4	8	—	0.333	3	4	—	0.429	0	0	—	0	0	0	—
28	Bronco Mendenhall	2025–present	1	13	6	7	—	0.462	4	4	—	0.500	0	1	—	0	0	0	—
