= Utah State Aggies football =

Utah State University football team

2026 Utah State Aggies football team
- First season: 1892; 134 years ago
- Athletic director: Cameron Walker
- Head coach: Bronco Mendenhall; 2nd season, 8–11 (.421)
- Location: Logan, Utah
- Stadium: Maverik Stadium (capacity: 25,513)
- Field: Merlin Olsen Field at Maverik Stadium
- NCAA division: Division I FBS
- Conference: Pac-12
- Colors: Navy blue, white, and pewter gray
- All-time record: 583–582–31 (.500)
- Bowl record: 6–12 (.333)

Conference championships
- RMAC: 1921, 1935, 1936 Skyline: 1946, 1960, 1961 Big West: 1978, 1979, 1993, 1996, 1997 WAC: 2012 MW: 2021

Division championships
- MW Mountain: 2013, 2021
- Consensus All-Americans: 3
- Rivalries: BYU (rivalry); Utah (Battle of the Brothers); Wyoming (rivalry)

Uniforms
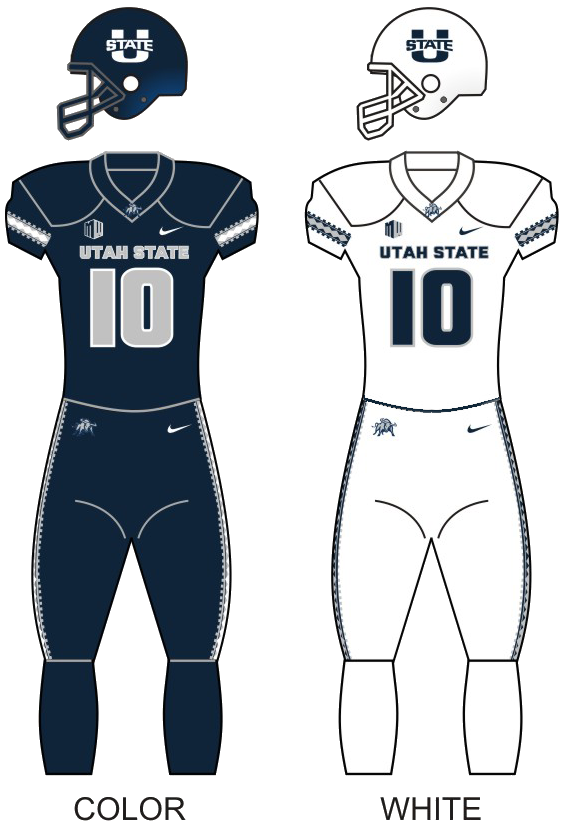
- Fight song: Hail the Utah Aggies
- Mascot: Big Blue
- Marching band: Aggie Marching Band
- Outfitter: Nike
- Website: Official website

The Utah State Aggies football team represents Utah State University (USU) in college football at the NCAA Division I FBS level. The Aggies compete in the Pac-12 Conference (Pac-12). Established in 1892, Utah State is one of the oldest football programs in the western United States and has played its home games at Merlin Olsen Field at Maverik Stadium in Logan, Utah since 1968.

Utah State has won thirteen conference championships across four different leagues, most recently in 2021. It has produced multiple All-Americans, a Professional Football Hall of Fame inductee Merlin Olsen, and numerous NFL players. The program's modern era has been marked by periods of national recognition, including Top-25 finishes, division titles, and bowl victories in 2012, 2013, 2014, 2018, and 2021.

On July 2, 2024, defensive coordinator Nate Dreiling was named interim head coach after head coach Blake Anderson was placed on administrative leave and subsequently terminated for alleged violations of reporting requirements. In December 2024, Utah State hired former BYU and Virginia head coach Bronco Mendenhall to lead the program, signing him to a six-year, $12.9 million contract beginning with the 2025 season.

The Aggies have appeared in eighteen bowl games, winning six: the 2021 LA Bowl against the Oregon State Beavers, the 2018 and 2014 New Mexico Bowls, the 2013 Poinsettia Bowl, the 2012 Famous Idaho Potato Bowl, and the 1993 Las Vegas Bowl against the Ball State Cardinals.

== History ==
=== Early history ===
The first intercollegiate athletic event in Utah State University's history took place on November 25, 1892, when the Agriculturalists defeated the football team from the University of Utah, 12–0. The game was played on what is now the quad, and it was the only game until 1896. The Aggies enjoyed early regional dominance, notching their first perfect season (7–0) in 1907. In 1911, under head coach Clayton Teetzel, the team again finished undefeated, even shutting out each of its five opponents by a collective score of 164–0. Hall of Fame. The makeshift field on the quad continued to serve the team until 1913, when football was moved to Adams Field, two blocks west of campus, where Adams Park now sits. The new field represented an improvement, but the facilities remained meager, a fact that became more apparent with the success of Coach E. L. "Dick" Romney, who came to Logan in 1918. Romney, for whom the current football stadium is named, led the team to its first-ever conference championship in 1921 and compiled a 128–91–16 record over 29 seasons.

=== Recent history ===
The program continued a rich legacy throughout the early and mid-20th century, when the program produced a large number of athletes who went on to play in the NFL, including the legendary brothers and consensus All-Americans Merlin Olsen and Phil Olsen, who played for the Aggies. It was during this time that Utah State finished two seasons with year-end Top 25 rankings: No. 10 in 1961 and No. 19 in 1972.

Following the great heights of the 1960s and 70s, Aggie football fell upon hard times. Many longtime Aggie supporters attribute the decline to administrators at both Utah and BYU freezing then-superior USU out of the newly forming WAC. However, other factors cited as leading to the decline include a failure to upgrade facilities until recently, a lack of donors to athletics, complacency of past athletics directors, and instability in conferences.

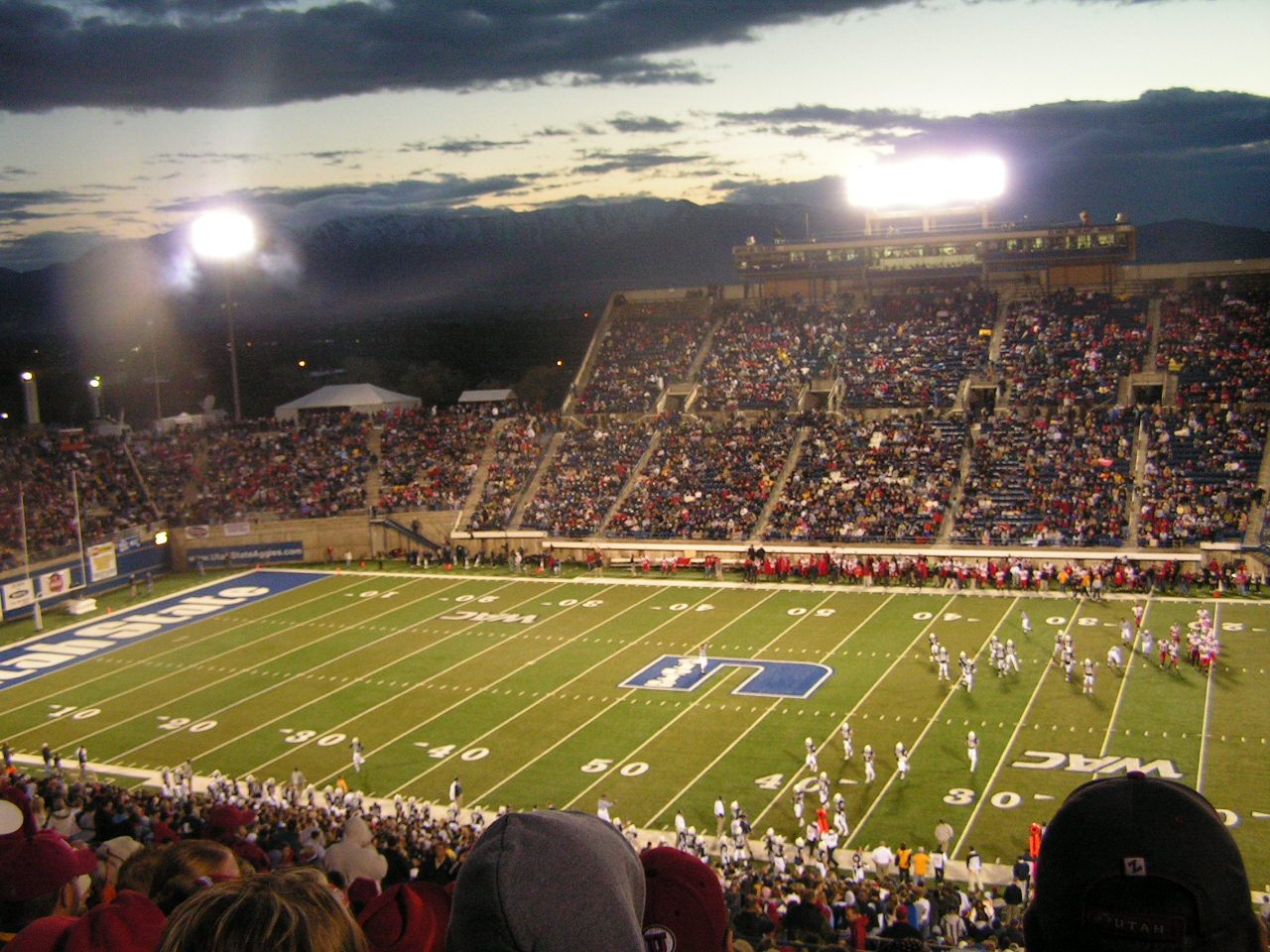
Football game being played at USU's Romney Stadium (now Merlin Olsen Field at Maverik Stadium)

After continual failed attempts to join the WAC, the program played as an independent program from 1962 to 1977 (until joining the PCAA/Big West in 1978). The program again played as an independent from 2001 to 2002 before joining the geographically distant Sun Belt Conference after the Big West Conference, which had housed the Aggies since 1978, elected to stop sponsoring football in 2001. USU's other teams remained in that conference until the school was finally invited to join the WAC in 2005. Despite having lobbied for years to join its in-state rivals Utah and BYU in the WAC, the Aggies gained membership only after the two other schools had left to form the Mountain West Conference. Later on, Utah State joined the Mountain West Conference in July 2013, again following departures by Utah and BYU.

==== Gary Andersen era (2009–2012) ====
In December 2008, Gary Andersen became the head coach of the Aggies, replacing Brent Guy following the unsuccessful 2008 season. Andersen would lead the team to new heights. In 2011, he led the team to the Famous Idaho Potato Bowl and the team's first winning season since 1997. The 2012 team found far greater success, notching the school's first double-digit win season, the first outright conference championship since 1936, a return to the Famous Idaho Potato Bowl for the first bowl win in 19 years, and a national Top 25 ranking in three major ranking systems: the AP poll, the ESPN/USA Today poll, and the BCS.

Andersen left the program following the 2012 season to become the new head coach for the University of Wisconsin.

==== Matt Wells era (2013–2018) ====
In December 2012, Matt Wells, Andersen's former offensive coordinator, was hired as the new head coach of the Utah State Aggies. Wells coached the Aggies in their inaugural year as members of the Mountain West Conference. Despite multiple injuries to offensive starters, the Aggies earned a berth in the first Mountain West Conference Football Championship Game, which they lost to Fresno State by a score of 17–24. Coach Wells was awarded the Mountain West Coach of the Year award and the Aggies defeated Northern Illinois in the Poinsettia Bowl by a score of 21–14. At the conclusion of the 2018 regular season, Matt Wells left to accept the head coaching job at Texas Tech University.

==== Return of Gary Andersen (2019–2020) ====
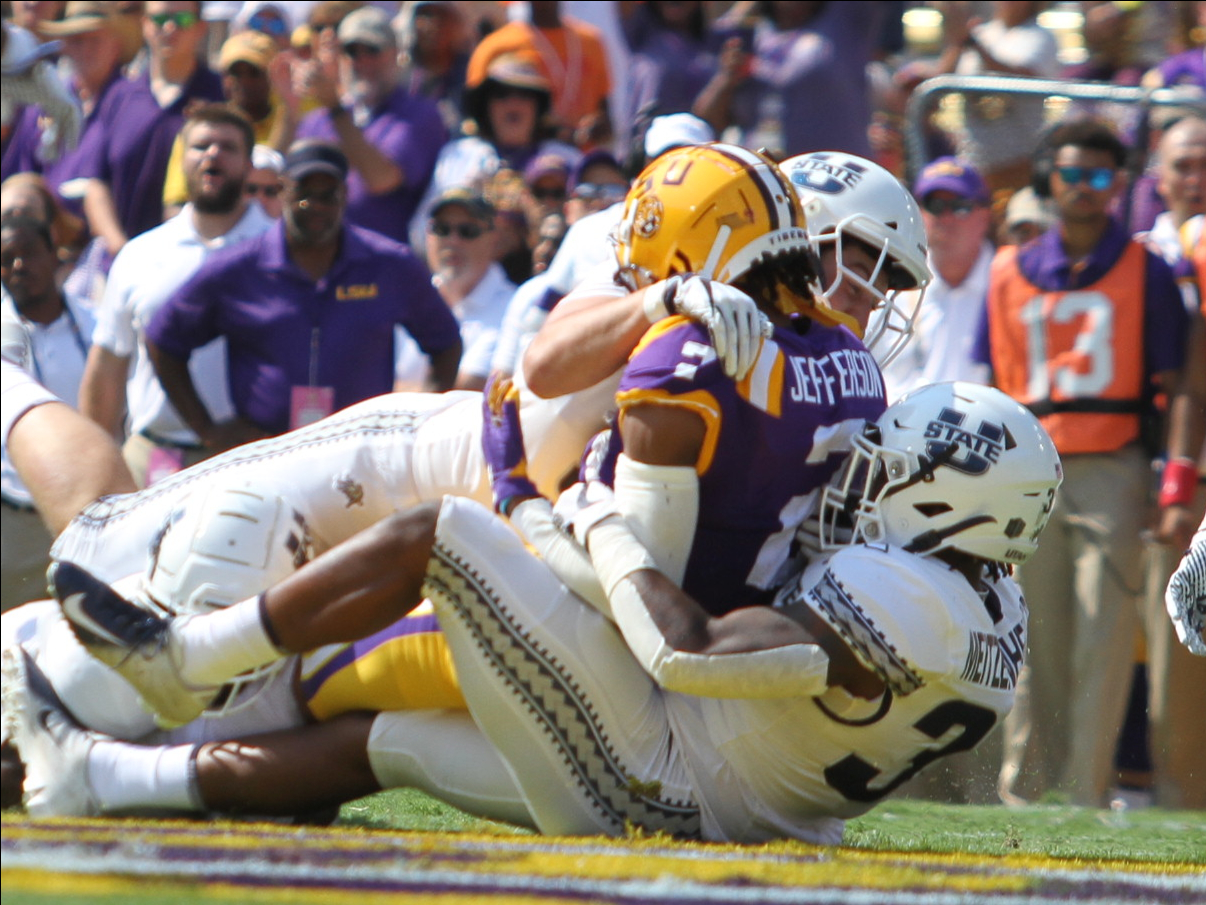
Utah State players tackling a Louisiana State football player in 2019

After Matt Wells left for Texas Tech following the 2018 season, Gary Andersen returned as head coach of the Utah State Aggies, beginning his second stint as Utah State's head coach in 2019. On November 7, 2020, Andersen and Utah State agreed to part ways after starting 0–3 during the 2020 season. Defensive coordinator Frank Maile was named the interim head coach of the Utah State Aggies for the remainder of the season.

==== Blake Anderson era (2021–2024) ====
On December 12, 2020, Blake Anderson was hired as the head coach of the Utah State Aggies football team, replacing Gary Andersen following an unsuccessful 2020 season. In his first season at the helm, Anderson guided the team to a 9–3 regular season record, good for the Mountain Division championship, as well as the conference championship with a victory over San Diego State. On July 2, 2024, it was announced that Anderson was placed on administrative leave with intent to fire and was unlikely to return due to alleged noncompliance with Title IX policies. Nate Dreiling was named interim head coach.

==== Bronco Mendenhall era (2025–present) ====
Dreiling led the Aggies to a 4–8 record in 2024. In December 2024, Utah State hired Bronco Mendenhall, the former BYU and Virginia head coach, after one season at New Mexico, signing him to a six-year contract. In his first season, the Aggies returned to a bowl game, losing 34–21 to Washington State in the Famous Idaho Potato Bowl in their final game as a Mountain West member; the program joined the Pac-12 for the 2026 season.

== Conference affiliations ==
Utah State has been affiliated with multiple conferences and has played as an independent.

- Independent (1892–1913)
- Rocky Mountain Athletic Conference (1914–1937)
- Mountain States Conference (1938–1961)
- University Division Independent (1962–1972)
- Division I Independent (1973–1977)
- Pacific Coast Athletic Association / Big West Conference (1978–2000)
- Division I-A Independent (2001–2002)
- Sun Belt Conference (2003–2004)
- Western Athletic Conference (2005–2012)
- Mountain West Conference (2013–2025)
- Pac-12 Conference (2026–present)

== Season-by-season results ==
Since first fielding a team in 1892, Utah State has completed more than 130 seasons of intercollegiate football across multiple conferences, including the Rocky Mountain Conference, Mountain States Conference, Big West, Sun Belt, Western Athletic Conference, Mountain West Conference, and beginning in 2026, the Pac-12 Conference. The Aggies' season-by-season results, including head coaches, overall and conference records, and postseason appearances, are listed below. Data are drawn from the Utah State University Football Media Guide and NCAA records.

Season	Head coach	Overall
1892	None	1–0
1893	—	— (Note: The school did not field a team this season.)
1894	—	—
1895	—	—
1896	Mayo	0–1
1897	—	—
1898	Dunning	0–1
1899	Langton	1–0
1900	Langton	0–1
1901	Richards	3–2–1
1902	Campbell	0–4
1903	Campbell	3–0
1904	Campbell	4–8
1905	Campbell	2–2–1
1906	Campbell	3–1
1907	Walker	7–0
1908	Walker	4–2
1909	Teezel	2–2–1
1910	Teetzel	5–2
1911	Teetzel	5–0
1912	Teetzel	4–2–1
1913	Teetzel	3–3
1914	Teetzel	2–5
1915	Teetzel	3–4
1916	Watson	1–5–1
1917	Watson	7–0–1
1918	Pickering	— (Note: No games played due to ongoing war.)
1919	Romney	5–2
1920	Romney	4–2–1
1921	Romney	7–1
1922	Romney	5–4
1923	Romney	5–2
1924	Romney	4–2–1
1925	Romney	6–1
1926	Romney	5–1–2
1927	Romney	3–4–1
1928	Romney	5–3–1
1929	Romney	3–4
1930	Romney	3–5–1
1931	Romney	6–2
1932	Romney	4–4
1933	Romney	4–4
1934	Romney	5–1–1
1935	Romney	5–2–1
1936	Romney	7–0–1
1937	Romney	2–4–2
1938	Romney	4–4
1939	Romney	3–4–1
1940	Romney	2–5–1
1941	Romney	0–8
1942	Romney	6–3–1
1943	—	—
1944	Romney	3–3
1945	Romney	4–3
1946	Romney	7–2–1
1947	Romney	6–5
1948	Romney	5–6
1949	Melinkovich	3–7
1950	Melinkovich	2–9
1951	Roning	3–5–1
1952	Roning	3–7–1
1953	Roning	8–3
1954	Roning	4–6
1955	Faunce	4–6
1956	Faunce	6–4
1957	Faunce	2–7–1
1958	Faunce	3–7
1959	Ralston	5–6
1960	Ralston	9–2
1961	Ralston	9–1–1
1962	Ralston	8–2
1963	Knap	8–2
1964	Knap	5–4–1
1965	Knap	8–2
1966	Knap	4–6
1967	Mills	7–2–1
1968	Mills	7–3
1969	Mills	3–7
1970	Mills	5–5
1971	Mills	8–3
1972	Mills	9–2
1973	Krueger	7–4
1974	Krueger	8–3
1975	Krueger	6–5
1976	Snyder	3–8
1977	Snyder	4–7
1978	Snyder	7–4
1979	Snyder	7–3–1
1980	Snyder	6–5
1981	Snyder	5–5–1
1982	Snyder	5–6
1983	Pella	5–6
1984	Pella	1–10
1985	Pella	3–8
1986	Shelton	3–8
1987	Shelton	5–6
1988	Shelton	4–7
1989	Shelton	4–7
1990	Shelton	5–5–1
1991	Shelton	5–6
1992	Weatherbie	5–6
1993	Weatherbie	7–5
1994	Weatherbie	3–8
1995	Smith	4–7
1996	Smith	6–5
1997	Smith	6–6
1998	Arslanian	3–8
1999	Arslanian	4–7
2000	Dennehy	5–6
2001	Dennehy	4–7
2002	Dennehy	4–7
2003	Dennehy	3–9
2004	Dennehy	3–8
2005	Guy	3–8
2006	Guy	1–11
2007	Guy	2–10
2008	Guy	3–9
2009	G. Andersen	4–8
2010	G. Andersen	4–8
2011	G. Andersen	7–6
2012	G. Andersen	11–2
2013	Wells	9–5
2014	Wells	10–4
2015	Wells	6–7
2016	Wells	3–9
2017	Wells	6–7
2018	Wells	10–2
2019	G. Andersen	7–6
2020	G. Andersen (Note: Coach Andersen was fired after starting the 2020 season 0–3. Frank Maile served as interim head coach for the remainder of the season.)	1–5 (Note: The 2020 season was limited due to the COVID-19 pandemic.)
2021	B. Anderson	11–3
2022	B. Anderson	6–7
2023	B. Anderson	6–7
2024	Dreiling (Interim)	4–8
2025	Mendenhall	6–7

== Championships ==
=== Conference championships ===
The Aggies have won 13 conference championships in their history, most recently winning the Mountain West championship (2021).

Season	Coach	Conference	Overall record	Conference record
1921	Dick Romney	Rocky Mountain Conference	7–1	4–0
1935†	Dick Romney	Rocky Mountain Conference	5–2–1	5–1–1
1936	Dick Romney	Rocky Mountain Conference	7–0–1	6–0–1
1946†	Dick Romney	Big Seven Conference	7–2–1	4–1–1
1960†	John Ralston	Skyline Conference	9–2	6–1
1961†	John Ralston	Skyline Conference	9–1–1	5–0–1
1978†	Bruce Snyder	Pacific Coast Athletic Association	7–4	3–1
1979	Bruce Snyder	Pacific Coast Athletic Association	8–2–1	4–0–1
1993†	Charlie Weatherbie	Big West Conference	7–5	5–1
1996†	John L. Smith	Big West Conference	6–5	4–1
1997†	John L. Smith	Big West Conference	6–6	4–1
2012	Gary Andersen	Western Athletic Conference	11–2	6–0
2021	Blake Anderson	Mountain West Conference	10–3	6–2

† Co-champions

=== Division championships ===
The Aggies were in the Mountain Division of the Mountain West Conference starting in the 2013 season, their inaugural season in the conference.

Season	Conference	Division	Coach	Opponent	CG Result
2013	Mountain West Conference	Mountain Division	Matt Wells	Fresno State	L 17–24
2021	Mountain West Conference	Mountain Division	Blake Anderson	San Diego State	W 46–13

== Bowl games ==
The Utah State Aggies have played in 18 bowl games (17 NCAA-sanctioned) with a record of 6–12.

No.	Year	Bowl	Opponent	Result	Coach	Final AP
1	1946	Raisin Bowl	San Jose State	L 0–20	Dick Romney	
2	1947	Grape Bowl†	Pacific	L 21–35	Dick Romney	
3	1960	Sun Bowl	New Mexico State	L 13–20	John Ralston	
4	1961	Gotham Bowl	Baylor	L 9–24	John Ralston	No. 10
5	1993	Las Vegas Bowl	Ball State	W 42–33	Charlie Weatherbie	
6	1997	Humanitarian Bowl	Cincinnati	L 19–35	John L. Smith	
7	2011	Famous Idaho Potato Bowl	Ohio	L 23–24	Gary Andersen	
8	2012	Famous Idaho Potato Bowl	Toledo	W 41–15	Gary Andersen	No. 16
9	2013	Poinsettia Bowl	Northern Illinois	W 21–14	Matt Wells	
10	2014	New Mexico Bowl	UTEP	W 21–6	Matt Wells	
11	2015	Famous Idaho Potato Bowl	Akron	L 21–23	Matt Wells	
12	2017	Arizona Bowl	New Mexico State	L 20–26	Matt Wells	
13	2018	New Mexico Bowl	North Texas	W 52–13	Frank Maile (interim)	No. 22
14	2019	Frisco Bowl	Kent State	L 41–51	Gary Andersen	
15	2021	LA Bowl	Oregon State	W 24–13	Blake Anderson	No. 24
16	2022	First Responder Bowl	Memphis	L 10–38	Blake Anderson	
17	2023	Famous Idaho Potato Bowl	Georgia State	L 22–45	Blake Anderson	
18	2025	Famous Idaho Potato Bowl	Washington State	L 21–34	Bronco Mendenhall	

† The Grape Bowl is listed in NCAA records, but was not an NCAA-sanctioned bowl game.

== Rivalries ==
Utah State has both old and new rivals. Older rivals include Brigham Young University, Cougars (Battle for the Old Wagon Wheel/Beehive Boot Trophy); the University of Utah, Utes (Battle of the Brothers/Beehive Boot Trophy); and the University of Wyoming, Cowboys and Cowgirls (Bridger's Battle/Bridger's Rifle Trophy).

=== BYU ===
The Cougars and Aggies started playing in 1922. BYU and Utah State have met 65 times for the Old Wagon Wheel, dating back to 1948. BYU had beaten Utah State ten straight times before Utah State defeated BYU 31–16 on October 1, 2010. With the victory, Utah State reclaimed the Old Wagon Wheel for the first time since 1993. The Old Wagon Wheel returned to Logan on October 3, 2014, when the Aggies defeated BYU 35–20. BYU is often referred to in local media as Utah State University's chief rival. It is the second oldest rivalry for both schools.

The series has not been played since September 29, 2022, when BYU won 38–26 in Provo; BYU withdrew from future games as it prepared to join the Big 12 Conference.

Current Record: 51–37–3; BYU Leads

Most Recent Game:

Date	Location	Score	Winner
September 29, 2022	Lavell Edwards Stadium, Provo Utah	26 - 38	BYU

=== Utah ===
The Battle of the Brothers refers to the rivalry between Utah State and Utah. Before the series resumed in 2024, the teams had met 112 times, with Utah leading 79–29–4. The Battle of the Brothers is the oldest FBS Division I college football rivalry in the United States between two public universities in the same state. Both programs first met in Logan on November 25, 1892, when the Aggies won 12–0. The two teams played every year from 1944 to 2009, but the series took a two-year hiatus in 2010 and 2011. On September 7, 2012, the Aggies snapped the 12-game losing streak, beating Utah 27–20 (OT) in Logan. The game was not played in 2014. The series continued in 2015 at Rice-Eccles Stadium, with Utah winning 24–14. Utah and Utah State agreed to renew the series, with the next game to be played in Logan, Utah, in 2024.

The meaning of "Battle of the Brothers" refers to the close connection, friendship, and mutual respect between Utah's two flagship universities: Bigger Brother (Utah) and Little Brother (Utah State)—deeply respectful of each other, but "fighting like brothers."

Current Record: 80–29–4; Utah Leads

Most Recent Game:

Date	Location	Score	Winner
September 14, 2024	Logan	21–38	Utah

=== Wyoming ===
Utah State and Wyoming first played in 1903, making the rivalry one of the oldest between the two schools. Early on, the teams met annually as members of the Rocky Mountain Athletic Conference from 1916 to 1937 and later the Mountain States Conference from 1938 to 1961. The teams continued to play each other frequently from 1962 to 1978, before taking an extended hiatus until 2001. The rivalry resumed annually when Utah State joined the Mountain West Conference for the 2013 season (in the same division as Wyoming), in a game now billed as "Bridger's Battle" after American frontiersman Jim Bridger. The trophy for the winning team is a .50-caliber Rocky Mountain Hawken rifle.

Current Record: 41–28–4; Utah State leads

Most Recent Game:

Date	Location	Score	Winner
October 26, 2024	War Memorial Stadium - Laramie, Wyoming	25-27	Utah State

== All-time record vs. Pac-12 teams ==
Official record (including any NCAA imposed vacates and forfeits) against all current Pac-12 opponents as of the completion of the 2025 season.

Opponent	Won	Lost	Ties	Percentage	Streak	First	Last
Boise State	5	25	0	.167	Lost 10	1975	2025
Colorado State	40	42	2	.488	Lost 1	1902	2024
Fresno State	14	19	1	.426	Won 1	1952	2025
Oregon State	1	3	0	.250	Won 1	1904	2021
San Diego State	5	13	0	.278	Won 3	1947	2024
Texas State	1	0	0	1.000	Won 1	2012	2012
Washington State	2	4	0	.333	Lost 2	1949	2025
Totals	68	106	3	.391			

== Individual accomplishments ==
=== Honors and awards ===
Outland Trophy

Outland Trophy
Year	Name	Position
1961	Merlin Olsen	Defensive lineman/ defensive tackle

The Outland Trophy is awarded to the best college football interior lineman in the United States as adjudged by the Football Writers Association of America.

Walter Camp Man of the Year Award

Walter Camp Man of the Year
Year	Name	Position at USU	Career at USU
1982	Merlin Olsen	Defensive lineman/ defensive tackle	1982

The Walter Camp Man of the Year is given to the "Man of the Year" in the world of college football. The criteria for the award are "success, leadership, public service, integrity, and commitment to American heritage and Walter Camp's philosophy."

Jet Award

Jet Award
Year	Name	Position
2018	Savon Scarver	Return specialist

The Jet Award, named in honor of 1972 Heisman Trophy Winner Johnny "the Jet" Rodgers, is awarded to the top return specialist in college football beginning with the 2011 season.

=== College Football Hall of Fame inductees ===
College Football Hall of Fame

Aggies in the College Football Hall of Fame
Name	Position	Career at USU	Year Inducted
Merlin Olsen	DL/ DT	1959-1961	1980
John Ralston	Coach	1959-1962	1992
LaVell Edwards	OL(Inducted as Coach)	1949-1951	2004

Ralston was named head coach at Utah State University in 1959. In four years there, he compiled a 31–11–1 record and won two Skyline Conference championships. Ralston moved to Stanford University in 1963 and compiled a 55–36–3 record over nine seasons. In his last two seasons, 1970–1971, Ralston's teams won two Pacific-8 titles and notched back-to-back Rose Bowl victories over Ohio State and Michigan, both of whom were undefeated coming into the Rose Bowl game. Under Ralston's tutelage, Stanford quarterback Jim Plunkett won the Heisman Trophy in 1970. John Ralston was inducted into the College Football Hall of Fame in 1992.

Merlin Olsen was first honored by the National Football Foundation in 1961, when he was chosen as one of the top scholar-athletes. He was a 1st Team Consensus All-America tackle at Utah State and winner of the Outland Trophy as the nation's best interior lineman. In 1980, Olsen was enshrined in the College Football Hall of Fame. He was the first to be a scholar-athlete winner and later a Hall of Famer. Olsen went on the play with the Los Angeles Rams. In both collegiate and pro play, he was known as a bruising, hard-hitting defensive lineman. Off the field, Olsen was known to be an intelligent and compassionate scholar. Following his pro football days, Olsen went into television, starring in "The Little House on the Prairie", and then into sports broadcasting as a member of the NBC Sports. He was known as a 'Tough Guy' on the field, 'Mr. Nice Guy' off the field.

LaVell Edwards was an American football head coach for Brigham Young University (BYU). With 257 career victories, he ranks as one of the most successful college football coaches of all time. Among his many notable accomplishments, Edwards guided BYU to a national championship in 1984 and coached Heisman Trophy winner Ty Detmer in 1990. Edwards played football for Utah State University and earned a master's degree before coaching at BYU, where he also earned his doctorate.

=== Retired numbers ===
Utah State Aggies retired numbers
No.	Player	Pos.	Tenure	No. ret.	Ref.
35	Elmer Ward	C	1932–1935	1994	
71	Merlin Olsen	DT	1959–1961	—N/a	

=== All-Americans ===
- Elmer Ward, C – 1934 (NEA-1st)
- Kent Ryan, HB – 1936 (AAB-1st; WC-1st)
- Gary Kapp, DE – 1960 (INS-2nd)
- Merlin Olsen, DT – 1960 (AFCA-3rd; NEA-1st; FWAA-1st; UPI-3rd)
- Merlin Olsen, DT – 1961 Consensus 1st Team (AFCA-1st; NEA-1st; FWAA-1st; UPI-1st)
- Lionel Aldridge, DL – 1962 (Honorable Mention)
- Henry King, DB – 1966 (NEA-2nd; Time-1st; TSN-1st)
- Bill Staley, DT – 1967 (CP-1st; NEA-2nd; UPI-2nd; FN-1st; Time-1st; TSN-1st)
- Phil Olsen, DE – 1969 Consensus 1st Team (AP-1st; NEA-1st; UPI-1st; Time-1st; TSN-1st; WC-1st)
- Alan McMurray, DE – 1971 (Sophomore All-American 1st Team)
- Tony Adams, QB – 1972 (AP-2nd)
- Dave Manning, G – 1973 (AP-2nd)
- Louie Giammona, RB – 1974 (AP-3rd; UPI-2nd)
- Louie Giammona, RB – 1975 (AP-3rd)
- Jim Hough, OG – 1977 (AP-2nd)
- Rulon Jones, DT – 1979 (AP-2nd; NEA-2nd; TSN)
- Tyler Larsen, C – 2012 (CFN-2nd)
- Dallin Leavitt, S – 2017 (SI.com All-America honorable mention)
- David Woodward, LB – 2018 (Pro Football Focus All-America 1st Team)

== Aggies in the NFL ==
First round draft picks

Name	Position	Year	Overall pick	Team
Merlin Olsen	DT	1962	3	Los Angeles Rams
Phil Olsen	DT	1970	4	Boston Patriots
Bill Munson	QB	1964	7	Los Angeles Rams
MacArthur Lane	RB	1968	13	St. Louis Cardinals
Jordan Love	QB	2020	26	Green Bay Packers

=== Active NFL ===
As of April 2026

- Deven Thompkins, Atlanta Falcons
- Jalen Davis, Cincinnati Bengals
- Jordan Love, Green Bay Packers
- Jalen Royals, Kansas City Chiefs

=== Pro Football Hall of Fame inductees ===
Name	Position	Years	Inducted
Merlin Olsen	DL	1959–1961	1982

Merin Olsen was a 14× Pro Bowler (1962–1975), NFL Rookie of the Year (1962), named to the NFL 1960s All-Decade Team, NFL 1970s All-Decade Team, NFL 75th Anniversary All-Time Team, NFL 100th Anniversary All-Time Team and is enshrined in the St. Louis Football Ring of Fame. His No. 74 was retired by the Los Angeles Rams. He won the Bert Bell Award in 1974 as the leagues "Player of the Year.".

== Future non-conference opponents ==
Announced schedules as of May 26, 2026.

2026	2027	2028	2029	2030	2031	2033
Idaho State	at Oklahoma	at UTEP	at Oregon	at Utah	Utah	at Utah
at Washington	Mercyhurst	Temple	at Nevada		Idaho State	
at Utah	Nevada					
Troy	Toledo					
