= Matt Wells (American football coach) =

American football player and coach (born 1973)

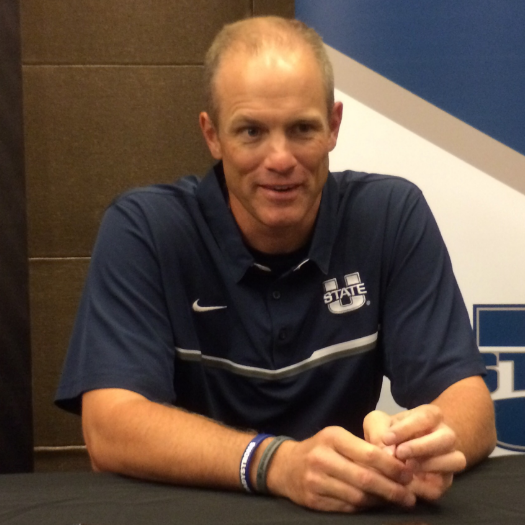
- Wells at 2016 Mountain West Media Days

Current position
- Title: Senior offensive consultant
- Team: Mississippi State
- Conference: SEC

Biographical details
- Born: August 10, 1973 (age 53); Columbia, South Carolina, U.S.

Playing career
- 1993–1996: Utah State
- Position: Quarterback

Coaching career (HC unless noted)
- 1997–2001: Navy (QB/FB/WR/JV)
- 2002–2006: Tulsa (TE/RC)
- 2007–2008: New Mexico (WR/RC)
- 2009: Louisville (QB/PGC)
- 2010: New Mexico (WR)
- 2011: Utah State (QB/RC)
- 2012: Utah State (OC/QB)
- 2013–2018: Utah State
- 2019–2021: Texas Tech
- 2022–2023: Oklahoma (OA)
- 2024: Kansas State (AHC/co-OC/QB)
- 2025: Kansas State (AHC/OC/QB)
- 2026–present: Mississippi State (OA)

Head coaching record
- Overall: 57–51
- Bowls: 2–2

Accomplishments and honors

Championships
- 1 MW Mountain Division (2013)

Awards
- 2× MW Coach of the Year (2013, 2018)

Matthew Scribner Wells (born August 10, 1973) is an American college football coach and former quarterback who serves a senior offensive consultant for Mississippi State Bulldogs. Wells previously served as offensive coordinator and then head coach at Utah State University, where he was named Mountain West Conference coach of the year in 2013 and 2018. Wells was named head football coach at Texas Tech University on November 29, 2018, and led the team until his firing midway through the 2021 season. He also served as an offensive analyst at the University of Oklahoma under head coach Brent Venables during the 2022 and 2023 seasons and as the associate head coach, offensive coordinator and quarterbacks coach at Kansas State University in 2024 and 2025.

== College playing career ==
Wells was a redshirt freshman during Utah State's 1993 Las Vegas Bowl season. He played quarterback in 16 games during the 1994 and 1995 seasons at USU, passing for 2,013 yards and 11 touchdowns. He was on the 1996 Big West Conference co-championship team, but did not play in a game. Wells was a three-year letterman from 1994 to 1996.

== Coaching career ==
Wells spent five years at the U.S. Naval Academy (1997–2001) as its quarterbacks coach, fullbacks coach, and wide receivers coach. He also served as the junior varsity head coach and offensive coordinator for three years. From 2002 to 2006 he was tight ends coach and recruiting coordinator at Tulsa.

Wells had two coaching stints at New Mexico, serving as the Lobos' wide receivers coach and recruiting coordinator from 2007 to 2008 and wide receivers and kickoff return unit coach in 2010. In 2009, Wells served as the quarterbacks coach and passing game coordinator at Louisville.

Wells has had at least one coach on his staff who later became head coach of another school. Josh Heupel became the head coach at the University of Central Florida after the departure of Scott Frost for the University of Nebraska, and is currently the head coach at the University of Tennessee. Heupel previously served under Wells in 2015 as the assistant head coach and offensive coordinator and quarterbacks coach.

=== Utah State ===
Wells returned to his alma mater Utah State as the quarterbacks coach in December 2010. Following the 2011 season, USU offensive coordinator Dave Baldwin left the program to take a similar position at Colorado State. Wells was tapped as his replacement and helped to guide the team to the Western Athletic Conference championship in 2012. The Aggies finished the season with a record of 11–2, a 41–15 victory over Toledo in the Famous Idaho Potato Bowl, and ranked 16th in the AP Poll. Head coach Gary Andersen resigned shortly after the bowl win to become the head coach at the University of Wisconsin. On December 20, 2012, Wells was named the 27th head coach in the history of the Utah State football program.

==== 2013 season ====
Wells' 2013 season began with a loss to Utah, followed by consecutive victories. After a close loss to USC, USU posted a 2–2 record on the season. The Aggies won the next game, but dropped the next two to bring the team to a 3–4 record on the season. Their preseason Heisman hopeful quarterback, Chuckie Keeton, was injured in game six against BYU, and was lost for the season. After a loss to Boise State, the squad rebounded and won the final five regular season games. These victories gave them the Mountain West Mountain Division Title, and a berth in the inaugural Mountain West Football Title Game. Due to the team's performance, Wells earned the 2013 MW Coach of the Year. After losing a close contest at Fresno State, USU earned an invitation to the Poinsettia Bowl against #23 Northern Illinois. They defeated the Huskies for the school's 3rd bowl win on December 26, 2013, with an impressive defensive performance that held Heisman Trophy finalist Jordan Lynch and the Huskies to 315 total yards and 14 points. USU finished the season ranked #12 in total defense and #7 in scoring defense.

==== 2014 season ====
The season again began with a 38–7 loss against the Tennessee Volunteers, but the Aggies rebounded with home wins against Idaho State and Wake Forest. Quarterback Chuckie Keeton was lost during the Wake Forest game after reinjuring his knee, but was replaced by second-string QB Darell Garretson, who had been the replacement starter the previous season. After dropping an overtime decision to Arkansas State, the Aggies came back to resoundingly defeat #18 BYU in Provo for the first time since 1978, by a score of 35–20. After opening conference play with a win against Air Force, Garretson was lost to a broken wrist in a loss to Colorado State, and replaced by third-string quarterback Craig Harrison, who was injured in the next game. Under the leadership of former scout team quarterback Kent Myers, the team went on to win the next four games, before losing to Boise State to claim a tie for second place in the Mountain Division. Utah State went on to play in the New Mexico Bowl, defeating UTEP 21–6. The Aggies again finished the season with impressive defensive statistics, ranked 12th in scoring defense and 30th in total defense, as well as achieving the second-best record in school history at 10–4.

==== 2015 season ====
In 2015, Wells led Utah State to six wins and its fifth-straight bowl game as the Aggies had 12 players earn various all-Mountain West honors, which were the third-most in the conference. Furthermore, senior linebacker Kyler Fackrell was named a fourth-team AllAmerican by Phil Steele's Magazine.

Utah State also had five players invited to postseason All-Star games/camps, while three Aggies participated in the NFL Combine in Fackrell, Hunter Sharp and Nick Vigil. Furthermore, USU had two players selected in the 2016 NFL draft in Vigil and Fackrell, both in the third round, while six other Aggies signed free agent contracts and two more were invited to rookie mini-camps.

==== 2016 season ====
During the 2016 season, Utah State had six players earn various all-Mountain West honors as it lost five conference games by a combined 29 points (5.8 ppg). USU also had two players invited to postseason AllStar games, while one player was selected in the 2017 NFL draft in Devante Mays. Furthermore, USU had eight other Aggies who signed free agent contracts.

==== 2017 season ====
In 2017, Wells led Utah State to six wins and its sixth bowl game in the past seven seasons as the Aggies had six players earn various all-Mountain West honors. Additionally, senior cornerback Jalen Davis became just the ninth first-team All-America in school history and was named an All-American by four different publications, including the Walter Camp Football Foundation, who voted him to their first team. Furthermore, sophomore placekicker Dominik Eberle was named a third-team All-American by Phil Steele's Magazine and was a finalist for the Lou Groza Award, which honors the top placekicker in college football. USU also had two players sign NFL free agent contracts following the season in Davis and Dallin Leavitt, while Braelon Roberts was invited to a rookie mini-camp.

==== 2018 season ====
In 2018, Utah State recorded one of its best seasons in school history in Wells’ final year as the Aggies closed the 2018 campaign ranked 21st in the final Amway Coaches’ poll and 22nd in the Associated Press poll. It marked only the fourth time in school history the Aggies, who climbed as high as No. 13 during the regular season, have ended a year among the top-25 schools in the AP poll. The No. 13 ranking was Utah State's highest at any point in a season since the 1961 campaign.

Wells was named the 2018 Mountain West Coach of the Year for the second time during his time in Logan, making him just the fifth Mountain West coach to receive the honor twice in a career, joining the likes of Sonny Lubick, Rocky Long, Urban Meyer and Gary Patterson. Utah State boasted one of the most dynamic offenses in the country in 2018, averaging 47.5 points per game, which only trailed Oklahoma among schools nationally. The Aggies, who also ranked among the national leaders for fewest sacks allowed (4th), total offense (11th), passing efficiency (14th) and passing offense (17th), lighted up scoreboards to the tune of 618 points on the season, snapping the Mountain West and Utah State single-season records in the process.

Overall, the Aggies snapped 34 school records and tied six others during the 2018 season alone, breaking the previous marks for touchdowns (79), points scored (618), points per game (47.5), total offense per game (497.4), yards of total offense (6,466), total passing yards (3,825), completions (303), extra points (75) and yards per kick return (30.3). Utah State also had 29 scoring drives under one minute, nearly double its previous school record.

It wasn't only the offense that pushed the Aggies as Utah State led or shared the national lead in turnovers gained (32), passes intercepted (22), kickoff return average (30.3) and three-and-outs forced (5.7 per game). Utah State finished plus-14 in the turnover margin, ranking third in the FBS for the category.

==== USU statistics under Wells ====
Year	Scoring offense FBS ranking	Scoring defense FBS ranking	Team record	Head coach	Offensive coordinator	Defensive coordinator
2012	26th	7th	11–2	Gary Andersen	Matt Wells	Dave Aranda
2013	49th	7th	9–5	Matt Wells	Kevin McGiven	Todd Orlando
2014	81st	12th	10–4	Matt Wells	Kevin McGiven	Todd Orlando
2015	64th	61st	6–7	Matt Wells	Josh Heupel	Kevin Clune
2016	107th	73rd	3–9	Matt Wells	Jovon Bouknight, Luke Wells	Frank Maile, Kendrick Shaver
2017	51st	67th	6–7	Matt Wells	David Yost	Frank Maile, Kendrick Shaver
2018	3rd	38th	10–2	Matt Wells	David Yost	Frank Maile/Keith Patterson

=== Texas Tech ===
On November 29, 2018, Wells was hired by Texas Tech as head football coach, signing a six-year contract.

==== 2019 season ====
In his inaugural game at the helm of the Red Raiders program on August 31, 2019, Wells led Texas Tech to a 45–10 victory over Montana State in the season opener at Jones AT&T Stadium. Texas Tech finished the season with a 4–8 record, including a win over No. 21 Oklahoma State and a 38–17 road win at West Virginia.

==== 2020 season ====
The 2020 Red Raiders struggled, finishing with a 4–6 record. After beginning the season with a win over Houston Baptist, the team was only able to win three conference games, all of which came at home: the victories were over West Virginia (by seven points), Baylor (one point), and Kansas (three points). After the season, offensive coordinator David Yost was fired.

==== 2021 season ====
Despite much speculation on Wells' future with the Red Raiders, he was retained for the 2021 season. Wells was dismissed as Texas Tech's head coach on October 25, 2021, following a home loss to Kansas State. First-year offensive coordinator Sonny Cumbie took over on an interim basis.

=== Oklahoma ===
On March 22, 2022, Wells was hired by Brent Venables to work on his support staff as one of his offensive analysts for the 2022 season.

=== Kansas State ===
On January 4, 2024, Wells was hired by Chris Klieman to fill the role of quarterbacks coach and work in tandem with offensive line coach Conor Riley as co-offensive coordinator for the 2024 season, a role vacated when former offensive coordinator Collin Klein left for Texas A&M. Riley departed after the 2024 season, and Wells was promoted to offensive coordinator and play caller.

== Personal life ==
Wells, a native of Sallisaw, Oklahoma, has one brother and two sisters. His father Jim was a dentist, and his brother Luke was hired as the Utah State co-offensive coordinator/tight end coach in 2013 and followed Matt to Texas Tech in 2019 as the tight ends/inside receivers coach. Wells received his bachelor's degree in business marketing from Utah State in 1996, graduating cum laude. He and his wife, Jen, have two daughters, Jadyn and Ella, and one son, Wyatt. Wells is a Christian.

== Head coaching record ==
Year	Team	Overall	Conference	Standing	Bowl/playoffs	Coaches^{#}	AP^{°}
Utah State Aggies (Mountain West Conference) (2013–2018)
2013	Utah State	9–5	7–1	1st (Mountain)	W Poinsettia		
2014	Utah State	10–4	6–2	T–2nd (Mountain)	W New Mexico		
2015	Utah State	6–7	5–3	T–2nd (Mountain)	L Famous Idaho Potato		
2016	Utah State	3–9	1–7	6th (Mountain)			
2017	Utah State	6–7	4–4	T–4th (Mountain)	L Arizona		
2018	Utah State	10–2	7–1	T–1st (Mountain) (Note: The Mountain West Conference did not credit Utah State as divisional co-champions due to their head-to-head loss against Boise State in the regular season)	W New Mexico (Note: Did not coach bowl game)	21	22
Utah State:		44–34	30–18				
Texas Tech Red Raiders (Big 12 Conference) (2019–2021)
2019	Texas Tech	4–8	2–7	9th			
2020	Texas Tech	4–6	3–6	8th			
2021	Texas Tech	5–3 (Note: Texas Tech fired Wells after eight games)	2–3				
Texas Tech:		13–17	7–16				
Total:		57–51					
National championship Conference title Conference division title or championship game berth
