= List of Akron Zips football seasons =

This is a list of seasons completed by the Akron Zips football team.

== Results ==
Year	Coach	Overall	Conference	Standing	Bowl/playoffs	Coaches^{#}	AP^{°}
Buchtel College (1891–1913)
1891	No coach	1–3					
1892	Frank Cook	3–4					
1893	John Heisman	5–2					
1894	John Heisman	1–0					
1895	No coach	3–2					
1896	Harry Wilson	0–1					
1897	No team						
1898	No team						
1899	Archie Eves	2–1					
1900	No coach	2–3–1					
1901	No team						
1902	Forest Firestone	2–5					
1903	Rev. Alfred Place	0–2					
1904	No team						
1905	No team						
1906	No team						
1907	No team						
1908	Dr. Dwight Bradley	3–4					
1909	Clarence Weed	4–4					
1910	Frank Haggerty	7–2					
1911	Frank Haggerty	3–4–1					
1912	Frank Haggerty	5–2–1					
1913	Frank Haggerty	3–4					
Akron Zips (1914)
1914	Frank Haggerty	4–4–1					
Ohio Athletic Conference (1915–1935)
1915	Fred Sefton	1–7–1	1–6				
1916	Fred Sefton	2–7	2–4				
1917	Fred Sefton	5–3	3–1				
1918	Fred Sefton	2–2–1	1–2–1				
1919	Fred Sefton	6–1–1	5–1–1				
1920	Fred Sefton	4–4	2–4				
1921	Fred Sefton	5–3	4–3				
1922	Fred Sefton	5–3	5–3				
1923	Fred Sefton	4–3–1	2–3–1				
1924	James Coleman	5–3	3–2				
1925	James Coleman	1–7	1–6				
1926	George Babcock	5–2–2	4–2–2				
1927	Red Blair	5–3	4–3				
1928	Red Blair	5–3	3–4				
1929	Red Blair	9–1	7–1				
1930	Red Blair	7–1	5–1				
1931	Red Blair	1–7	0–7				
1932	Red Blair	2–4–3	1–4–2				
1933	Red Blair	5–3–1	5–2–1				
1934	Red Blair	3–4–1	3–4				
1935	Red Blair	6–3	6–3				
1936	James Aiken	6–2–1	5–1–1				
Independent (1937–1947)
1937	James Aiken	7–2					
1938	James Aiken	6–3					
1939	Thomas Dowler	5–4					
1940	Thomas Dowler	2–5–2					
1941	Otis Douglas	5–3–1					
1942	Otis Douglas	0–7–2					
1943	No team						
1944	No team						
1945	No team						
1946	Paul Baldacci	5–4					
1947	Paul Baldacci	2–7					
Ohio Athletic Conference (1948–1965)
1948	William Houghton	2–6	1–4				
1949	William Houghton	2–6–1	0–3–1				
1950	William Houghton	2–7	1–3				
1951	William Houghton	1–8	1–3				
1952	Red Cochrane	2–6–1	2–2–1				
1953	Red Cochrane	6–3	4–2				
1954	Joe McMullen	3–5	3–4				
1955	Joe McMullen	6–2	6–2				
1956	Joe McMullen	3–5–1	3–5–1				
1957	Joe McMullen	7–1–1	6–1–1				
1958	Joe McMullen	6–2–1	6–2				
1959	Joe McMullen	4–5	4–3				
1960	Joe McMullen	1–8	1–6				
1961	Gordon Larson	6–2	6–1				
1962	Gordon Larson	7–2	7–1				
1963	Gordon Larson	6–3	5–2				
1964	Gordon Larson	6–3	4–3				
1965	Gordon Larson	5–3–1	4–1				
Independent (1966–1973)
1966	Gordon Larson	6–3					
1967	Gordon Larson	4–4–1					
1968	Gordon Larson	7–3–1			L 13–33 Grantland Rice Bowl		
1969	Gordon Larson	9–1					
1970	Gordon Larson	7–3					
1971	Gordon Larson	8–2					
1972	Gordon Larson	3–4–2					
1973	Jim Dennison	6–5					
Division II (1974–1980)
1974	Jim Dennison	5–5					
1975	Jim Dennison	7–4					
1976	Jim Dennison	10–3					
1977	Jim Dennison	6–4–1					
Mid-Continent Conference (1978–1979)
1978	Jim Dennison	6–5	4–1				
1979	Jim Dennison	6–5	3–2				
Division I-AA (Ohio Valley Conference) (1980–1986)
1980	Jim Dennison	3–7–1	2–4–1	5th			
1981	Jim Dennison	5–5	4–4	T-4th			
1982	Jim Dennison	6–2	5–2	2nd			
1983	Jim Dennison	8–3	5–2	T-2nd			
1984	Jim Dennison	4–7	2–5	6th			
1985	Jim Dennison	8–4	5–2	T-2nd	L I-AA First Round		
1986	Gerry Faust	7–6	4–3	T-3rd			
Division I-A Independent (1987–1991)
1987	Gerry Faust	4–7					
1988	Gerry Faust	5–6					
1989	Gerry Faust	5–6					
1990	Gerry Faust	3–7–1					
1991	Gerry Faust	5–6					
Mid-American Conference (1992–present)
1992	Gerry Faust	7–3–1	5–3	T-3rd			
1993	Gerry Faust	5–6	4–4	5th			
1994	Gerry Faust	1–10	1–8	9th			
1995	Lee Owens	2–9	2–6	T-7th			
1996	Lee Owens	4–7	3–5	T-7th			
1997	Lee Owens	2–9	2–6	6th (East)			
1998	Lee Owens	4–7	2–6	5th (East)			
1999	Lee Owens	7–4	5–3	T-3rd (East)			
2000	Lee Owens	6–5	5–3	T-1st (East)			
2001	Lee Owens	4–7	4–4	T-4th (East)			
2002	Lee Owens	4–8	3–5	5th (East)			
2003	Lee Owens	7–5	5–3	3rd (East)			
2004	J. D. Brookhart	6–5	6–2	2nd (East)			
2005	J. D. Brookhart	7–6	5–3	T-1st (East)	L 38–31 Motor City Bowl		
2006	J. D. Brookhart	5–7	3–5	T-3rd (East)			
2007	J. D. Brookhart	4–8	3–5	6th (East)			
2008	J. D. Brookhart	5–7	3–5	T-4th (East)			
2009	J. D. Brookhart	3–9	2–6	5th (East)			
2010	Rob Ianello	1–11	1–7	6th (East)			
2011	Rob Ianello	1–11	0–8	7th (East)			
2012	Terry Bowden	1–11	0–8	7th (East)			
2013	Terry Bowden	5–7	4–4	4th (East)			
2014	Terry Bowden	5–7	3–5	T-4th (East)			
2015	Terry Bowden	8–5	5–3	T-2nd (East)	W 23–21 Famous Idaho Potato Bowl		
2016	Terry Bowden	5–7	3–5	T-3rd (East)			
2017	Terry Bowden	7–7	6–2	1st (East)	L 3–50 Boca Raton Bowl		
2018	Terry Bowden	4–8	2–6	T-4th (East)			
2019	Tom Arth	0–12	0–8	6th (East)			
2020	Tom Arth	1–5	1–5	5th (East)			
2021	Tom Arth	2–10	1–7	6th (East)			
2022	Joe Moorhead	2–10	1–7	6th (East)			
2023	Joe Moorhead	2–10	1–7	5th (East)			
2024	Joe Moorhead	4–8	3–5	8th			
2025	Joe Moorhead	5–7	4–4	T–6th			
Total:		534–608–36					
National championship Conference title Conference division title or championship game berth
^{†}Indicates Bowl Coalition, Bowl Alliance, BCS, or CFP / New Years' Six bowl.; ^{#}Rankings from final Coaches Poll.
