= New Mexico Bowl =

NCAA-sanctioned post-season college football bowl game

- Isleta New Mexico Bowl
- Stadium: University Stadium (2006–present)
- Location: Albuquerque, New Mexico (2006–present)
- Temporary venue: Toyota Stadium, Frisco, Texas (2020)
- Operated: 2006–present
- Conference tie-ins: MWC, C-USA
- Previous conference tie-ins: WAC (2006–2010); Pac-12 (2012–2013)
- Payout: US$1.05 million (2019)
- Website: newmexicobowl.com

Sponsors
- Gildan (2011–2017); PUBG Mobile (2021); Isleta Resort and Casino (2023–present)

Former names
- New Mexico Bowl (2006–2010, 2018–2020, 2022); Gildan New Mexico Bowl (2011–2017); PUBG New Mexico Bowl (2021)

2025 matchup
- North Texas vs. San Diego State (North Texas 49–47)

The New Mexico Bowl is an NCAA-sanctioned post-season college football bowl game that has been played annually since 2006 at University Stadium, on the campus of the University of New Mexico in Albuquerque, New Mexico. Owned and operated by ESPN Events, it has typically been scheduled as one of the first games of the bowl season. The bowl has tie-ins with Conference USA and the Mountain West Conference.

Due to the COVID-19 pandemic, the 2020 New Mexico Bowl was moved to Toyota Stadium in Frisco, Texas.

== History ==
The New Mexico Bowl trophy is a 20-inch (51 cm) piece of Zia Pueblo pottery, painted with Pueblo symbols, the New Mexico Bowl logo, football players, and the logos of the competing teams. The Zia sun symbol, a Zia Pueblo symbol that is used in the state flag, is incorporated into the bowl game logo. The most valuable player trophies are crafted from traditional leather shields.

From 2011 to 2017, the bowl was sponsored by clothing manufacturer Gildan and was officially known as the Gildan New Mexico Bowl. In 2019, the bowl announced a sponsorship with DreamHouse Productions, a local film studio. However, in October 2019, the company was quietly dropped as sponsor, coinciding with investigations by a local sports website, EnchantmentSports.com, that alleged DreamHouse Productions was tied to a scam artist and questioned the company's legitimacy.

The 2021 edition of the game was sponsored by PUBG Mobile. In September 2023, the Isleta Pueblo, an operator of resorts and casinos, was named the new title sponsor of the bowl.

== Game results ==
Rankings are based on the AP poll prior to the game being played.

Date	Winning team		Losing team		Attend.	Notes
December 23, 2006	San Jose State	20	New Mexico	12	34,111	notes
December 22, 2007	New Mexico	23	Nevada	0	30,223	notes
December 20, 2008	Colorado State	40	Fresno State	35	24,735	notes
December 19, 2009	Wyoming	35	Fresno State	28 (2OT)	24,898	notes
December 18, 2010	BYU	52	UTEP	24	32,424	notes
December 17, 2011	Temple	37	Wyoming	15	25,762	notes
December 15, 2012	Arizona	49	Nevada	48	24,610	notes
December 21, 2013	Colorado State	48	Washington State	45	27,104	notes
December 20, 2014	Utah State	21	UTEP	6	28,725	notes
December 19, 2015	Arizona	45	New Mexico	37	30,289	notes
December 17, 2016	New Mexico	23	UTSA	20	29,688	notes
December 16, 2017	Marshall	31	Colorado State	28	26,087	notes
December 15, 2018	Utah State	52	North Texas	13	25,387	notes
December 21, 2019	San Diego State	48	Central Michigan	11	18,823	notes
December 24, 2020	Hawaii	28	Houston	14	2,060	notes
December 18, 2021	Fresno State	31	UTEP	24	16,422	notes
December 17, 2022	BYU	24	SMU	23	22,209	notes
December 16, 2023	Fresno State	37	New Mexico State	10	30,822	notes
December 28, 2024	TCU	34	Louisiana	3	22,827	notes
December 27, 2025	No. 23 North Texas	49	San Diego State	47	18,867	notes

== MVPs ==
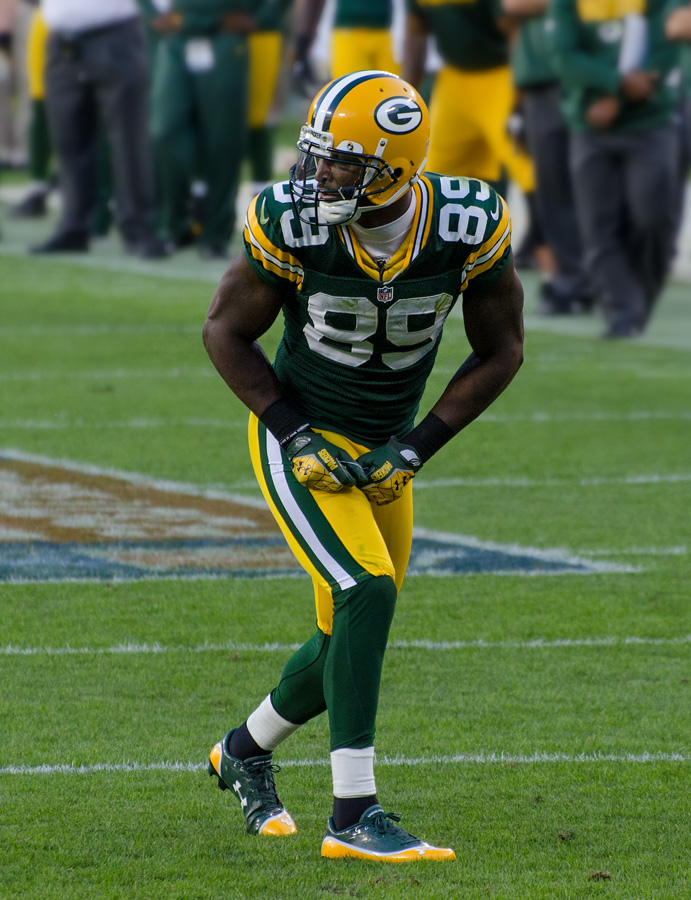
2006 offensive MVP James Jones

Year	Offensive MVP			Defensive MVP		
Year	Player	Team	Pos.	Player	Team	Pos.
2006	James Jones	San José State	WR	Matt Castelo	San José State	LB
2007	Donovan Porterie	New Mexico	QB	Brett Madsen	New Mexico	LB
2008	Gartrell Johnson	Colorado State	RB	Tommie Hill	Colorado State	DE
2009	Austyn Carta-Samuels	Wyoming	QB	Mitch Unrein	Wyoming	DE
2010	Jake Heaps	BYU	QB	Andrew Rich	BYU	FS
2011	Chris Coyer	Temple	QB	Tahir Whitehead	Temple	LB
2012	Matt Scott	Arizona	QB	Marquis Flowers	Arizona	LB
2013	Connor Halliday	Washington State	QB	Shaquil Barrett	Colorado State	DE
2014	Kent Myers	Utah State	QB	Zach Vigil	Utah State	LB
2015	Anu Solomon	Arizona	QB	Scooby Wright III	Arizona	LB
2016	Lamar Jordan	New Mexico	QB	Dakota Cox	New Mexico	LB
2017	Tyre Brady	Marshall	WR	Channing Hames	Marshall	DL
2018	Jordan Love	Utah State	QB	DJ Williams	Utah State	DB
2019	Jordan Byrd; Jesse Matthews	San Diego State	RB; WR	Kyahva Tezino	San Diego State	LB
2020	Calvin Turner	Hawaii	WR	Darius Muasau	Hawaii	LB
2021	Jordan Mims	Fresno State	RB	Elijah Gates	Fresno State	DB
2022	Sol-Jay Maiava-Peters	BYU	QB	Ben Bywater	BYU	LB
2023	Mikey Keene	Fresno State	QB	Levelle Bailey	Fresno State	LB
2024	Josh Hoover	TCU	QB	Devean Deal	TCU	LB
2025	Caleb Hawkins	North Texas	RB	Will Jones II	North Texas	S

== Most appearances ==
Updated through the December 2025 edition (20 games, 40 total appearances).

Teams with multiple appearances

Rank	Team	Appearances	Won	Lost	Win pct.
1	New Mexico	4	2	2	.500
1	Fresno State	4	2	2	.500
3	Colorado State	3	2	1	.667
3	UTEP	3	0	3	.000
5	Arizona	2	2	0	1.000
5	Utah State	2	2	0	1.000
5	BYU	2	2	0	1.000
5	North Texas	2	1	1	.500
5	San Diego State	2	1	1	.500
5	Wyoming	2	1	1	.500
5	Nevada	2	0	2	.000

Teams with a single appearance

Won (5): Hawaii, Marshall, San Jose State, TCU, Temple
Lost (7): Central Michigan, Houston, Louisiana, New Mexico State, SMU, UTSA, Washington State

Air Force, Boise State and UNLV are the only current Mountain West Conference members that have not appeared in the bowl.

== Appearances by conference ==
Updated through the December 2025 edition (20 games, 40 total appearances).

Conference	Record				Appearances by season	
Conference	Games	W	L	Win pct.	Won	Lost
Mountain West	18	12	6	.667	2007, 2008, 2009, 2010, 2013, 2014, 2016, 2018, 2019, 2020, 2021, 2023	2006, 2011, 2012, 2015, 2017, 2025
CUSA	7	1	6	.143	2017	2010, 2014, 2016, 2018, 2021, 2023
WAC	4	1	3	.250	2006	2007, 2008, 2009
Pac-12	3	2	1	.667	2012, 2015	2013
American	3	1	2	.333	2025	2020, 2022
MAC	2	1	1	.500	2011	2019
Independents	1	1	0	1.000	2022	
Big 12	1	1	0	1.000	2024	
Sun Belt	1	0	1	.000		2024

- The WAC no longer sponsors FBS football.
- Independent appearances: BYU (2022)

== Game records ==
Team	Performance vs. Opponent	Year
Most points scored (one team)	52, shared by: BYU vs. UTEP; Utah State vs. North Texas	2010; 2018
Most points scored (losing team)	48, Nevada vs. Arizona	2012
Most points scored (both teams)	97, Nevada vs. Arizona	2012
Fewest points allowed	0, New Mexico vs. Nevada	2007
Largest margin of victory	39, Utah State vs. North Texas	2018
Total yards	659, Nevada vs. Arizona	2012
Rushing yards	404, Nevada vs. Arizona	2012
Passing yards	410, Washington State vs. Colorado State	2013
First downs	39, Nevada vs. Arizona	2012
Fewest yards allowed	200, New Mexico State vs. Fresno State	2023
Fewest rushing yards allowed	–12, BYU vs. UTEP	2010
Fewest passing yards allowed	47, BYU vs. SMU	2022
Individual	Player, Team	Year
All-purpose yards	375, Gartrell Johnson (Colorado State)	2008
Points scored	30, Connor Halliday (Washington State)	2013
Rushing yards	285, Gartrell Johnson (Colorado State)	2008
Rushing touchdowns	3, shared by 4 players: Ka'Deem Carey (Arizona); Kapri Bibbs (Colorado State); Jared Baker (Arizona); Lamar Jordan (New Mexico)	2012; 2013; 2015; 2015
Passing yards	410, Connor Halliday (Washington State)	2013
Passing touchdowns	6, Connor Halliday (Washington State)	2013
Receiving yards	182, Cayleb Jones (Arizona)	2015
Receiving touchdowns	3, shared by: Kris Adams (UTEP); Cody Hoffman (BYU)	2010; 2010
Tackles	18, Matt Castelo (San Jose State)	2006
Sacks	2, shared by: Brett Madsen (New Mexico); Mitch Unrein (Wyoming); Cory James (Colorado State); Scooby Wright III (Arizona); Tipa Galeai (Utah State); Khoury Bethley (Hawai'i); Jeremiah Pritchard (Hawai'i)	2007; 2009; 2013; 2015; 2018; 2020; 2020
Interceptions	2, shared by: Andrew Rich (BYU); D.J. Williams (Utah State)	2010; 2018
Long Plays	Player, Team	Year
Touchdown run	90 yds., Tyler King (Marshall)	2017
Touchdown pass	92 yds., Lamar Jordan to Delane Hart–Johnson (New Mexico)	2015
Kickoff return	92 yds., Calvin Turner (Hawaii)	2020
Punt return	63 yds., Nathan Acevedo (San Diego State)	2025
Interception return	76 yds., Ben Bywater (BYU)	2022
Fumble return	56 yds., Damaja Jones (San Jose State)	2006
Punt	67 yds., Ryan Rehkow (BYU)	2022
Field goal	53 yds., John Sullivan (New Mexico)	2007

== Media coverage ==
ESPN College Football holds the rights to televise the New Mexico Bowl. In 2006, the inaugural edition of the bowl, the game was carried on ESPN2, from 2007 to 2021 the game was carried on ESPN, In 2022, the game was carried on ABC.
