= Hunter Sharp =

American football player (born 1994)

No. 4, 14, 17, 15, 84, 11
- Position: Wide receiver

Personal information
- Born: April 25, 1994 (age 32); Palmdale, California, U.S.
- Listed height: 5 ft 11 in (1.80 m)
- Listed weight: 199 lb (90 kg)

Career information
- High school: Highland (Palmdale, California)
- College: Utah State
- NFL draft: 2016: undrafted

Career history
- Philadelphia Eagles (2016)*; Denver Broncos (2016–2017); New York Giants (2017); Buffalo Bills (2018)*; Cincinnati Bengals (2018); Houston Roughnecks (2020); Colorado Spartans (2025)
- * Offseason or practice squad member only

Career NFL statistics
- Receptions: 5
- Receiving yards: 54
- Receiving touchdowns: 1
- Stats at Pro Football Reference

Hunter Sharp (born April 25, 1994) is an American professional football wide receiver. He played college football at Utah State.

== College career ==
Sharp was considered a two-star athlete coming out of high school by 247 Sports. Due to minimal scouting coverage in the Antelope Valley area, Sharp attended Antelope Valley College, where he had over 1,000 receiving yards and 9 touchdowns in the California JUCO circuit. After 2 years at AVC, Sharp committed to Utah State on February 5, 2014.

=== 2014 season ===
In Sharp's first year at Utah State he played in 13 games and had 66 receptions for 939 yards and seven touchdowns. He also totaled six rushing attempts for 28 yards. This included a trip to the 2014 New Mexico Bowl, where Utah State beat the UTEP Miners 21–6.

=== 2015 season ===
Sharp was suspended for the first two games of the 2015 season for violation of team rules. In his second year at Utah State, Sharp played in 11 games and totaled 71 receptions for 835 yards and nine touchdowns, plus eight rushing attempts for 20 yards. Utah State was invited to the 2015 Famous Idaho Potato Bowl, where they lost to Akron 23–21. Sharpe had 11 receptions for 89 yards and one touchdown in the loss.

== Professional career ==
Pre-draft measurables
Height	Weight	Arm length	Hand span	40-yard dash	20-yard shuttle	Three-cone drill	Vertical jump	Broad jump	Bench press
5 ft 11 in (1.80 m)	189 lb (86 kg)	31 5/8 in (0.80 m)	9 3/8 in (0.24 m)	4.51 s	4.14 s	7.08 s	32 1/2 in (0.83 m)	9 ft 8 in (2.95 m)	12 reps
All values from the NFL Combine and Utah State's Pro Day.

Sharp entered the 2016 NFL draft and was projected by many scouts to go from anywhere in the late fifth round to the seventh round, but ultimately was not selected.

=== Philadelphia Eagles ===
Sharp signed with the Philadelphia Eagles as an undrafted free agent on May 5, 2016. He was waived by the Eagles on August 24, 2016.

=== Denver Broncos ===
On December 28, 2016, Sharp was signed to the Denver Broncos' practice squad. He signed a reserve/future contract with the team on January 2, 2017.

On September 2, 2017, Sharp was waived by the Broncos and was signed to the practice squad the next day. He was promoted to the active roster on October 18. He was waived by the Broncos on October 28, and re-signed to the practice squad.

=== New York Giants ===
On December 12, 2017, Sharp was signed by the New York Giants off the Broncos' practice squad. Sharp caught his first career touchdown in Week 17 on a 16-yard pass from Eli Manning. He ended the game with three receptions for 29 yards and the touchdown.

On September 2, 2018, Sharp was waived by the Giants.

=== Buffalo Bills ===
On September 18, 2018, Sharp was signed to the Buffalo Bills' practice squad. He was released on November 7, 2018.

=== Cincinnati Bengals ===
On November 20, 2018, Sharp was signed to the Cincinnati Bengals practice squad. He was promoted to the active roster on December 28, 2018.

Sharp was waived during final roster cuts on August 31, 2019.

=== Houston Roughnecks ===
On November 22, 2019, Sharp was drafted by the Houston Roughnecks in the 2020 XFL Supplemental Draft. He was placed on injured reserve on January 13, 2020. He had his contract terminated when the league suspended operations on April 10, 2020.

== Personal life ==
Sharp is the cousin of former Kansas City Chiefs and Oakland Raiders linebacker Derrick Johnson.
