= Frank Maile =

American football player and coach (born 1982)

Current position
- Title: Assistant defensive line coach
- Team: Boise State
- Conference: MW

Biographical details
- Born: January 21, 1982 (age 44); Kearns, Utah, U.S.

Playing career
- 2004–2007: Utah State
- Position: Defensive lineman

Coaching career (HC unless noted)
- 2009–2010: Utah State (GA)
- 2011–2013: Utah State (DL)
- 2014–2015: Vanderbilt (DL)
- 2016–2018: Utah State (AHC/co-DC/DL)
- 2018: Utah State (interim HC)
- 2019: Utah State (AHC/TE)
- 2020: Utah State (AHC/co-DC/DL)
- 2020: Utah State (interim HC/co-DC/DL)
- 2021–2022: Boise State (AHC/DL)
- 2023–2024: Washington State (DE)
- 2025–present: Boise State (Asst. DL)

Head coaching record
- Overall: 2–2
- Bowls: 1–0

Frank Maile (born January 21, 1982) is an American football coach who is currently a defensive analyst at Boise State University. He served as the interim head coach for Utah State for their bowl game against North Texas in 2018, as well as in 2020 when Gary Andersen was fired.

== Playing career ==
Maile went to high school at Alta High School in Sandy, Utah. He then attended Utah State, where he played as a defensive lineman from 2004 to 2007. He played in 42 games during his career, starting 21, and was named a team captain his senior season.

== Coaching career ==
After his playing career at Utah State ended, Maile spent two years with the Aggies as a graduate assistant working with the defense. He was promoted to the defensive line coach in 2011, spending three seasons in that role before departing to be the defensive line coach at Vanderbilt on Derek Mason's inaugural staff in 2014. Maile was named the assistant head coach, co-defensive coordinator, and defensive line coach at Utah State in 2016, spending three seasons in that role.

=== Interim head coach ===
He served as the interim head coach of the Aggies in 2018 after Matt Wells departed the program to be the head coach at Texas Tech. He won his lone game as interim head coach, a 52–13 victory over North Texas in the New Mexico Bowl.

Following the hire of Utah assistant head coach and former Utah State head coach Gary Andersen, Maile was shifted to the tight ends coach in 2019, but was renamed the co-defensive coordinator and defensive line coach in 2020 after Justin Ena's demotion from defensive coordinator.

Maile became interim head coach for a second time on November 7, 2020, when Utah State parted ways with Andersen.

In December 2020 Utah State was accused of discrimination by members of the football team, who refused to play a scheduled game after they alleged the president of the school, Noelle Cockett, had made discriminatory comments about interim coach Maile's religious background.

=== Boise State assistant ===
Maile was named the assistant head coach and defensive line coach at Boise State in 2021.

== Personal life ==
Born in Kearns, Utah, Maile served a two-year religious mission in the Dominican Republic before playing at Utah State. Maile is married with four children.

== Head coaching record ==
| Year | Team | Overall | Conference | Standing | Bowl/playoffs | Coaches^{#} | AP^{°} |
|---|---|---|---|---|---|---|---|
Utah State Aggies (Mountain West Conference) (2018)
| 2018 | Utah State | 1–0 (Note: Matt Wells departed Utah State November 29 to become the head coach at Texas Tech. Maile served as the team's head coach during their bowl game.) | 0–0 | | W New Mexico | 21 | 22 |
Utah State Aggies (Mountain West Conference) (2020)
| 2020 | Utah State | 1–2 (Note: Utah State fired Gary Andersen on November 7. Maile served as the team's head coach for the remainder of the season.) | 1–2 | 11th | | | |
| Utah State: | | 2–2 | 1–2 | | | | |
| Total: | | 2–2 | | | | | |
^{#}Rankings from final Coaches Poll.; ^{°}Rankings from final AP Poll.
