= 2018 New Mexico Bowl =

College football bowl game

- 13th New Mexico Bowl
Utah State Aggies	North Texas Mean Green
(10–2)	(9–3)
Mountain West	C-USA
52	13
Head coach: Frank Maile (interim)	Head coach: Seth Littrell
Coaches 23
	1	2	3	4	Total
Utah State	14	24	7	7	52
North Texas	7	0	6	0	13
- Date: December 15, 2018
- Season: 2018
- Stadium: Dreamstyle Stadium
- Location: Albuquerque, New Mexico
- MVP: Jordan Love (QB, Utah State) & DJ Williams (DB, Utah State)
- Favorite: Utah State by 9
- Referee: Kyle Olson (Sun Belt)
- Attendance: 25,387

United States TV coverage
- Network: ESPN & ESPN Radio
- Announcers: Mark Neely, John Congemi and Quint Kessenich (ESPN); Bill Roth, Barrett Jones and Taylor Davis (ESPN Radio)

The 2018 New Mexico Bowl was a college football bowl game played on December 15, 2018, with kickoff scheduled for 2:00 p.m. EST (12:00 p.m. local MST). It was the 13th edition of the New Mexico Bowl, and one of the 2018–19 bowl games concluding the 2018 FBS football season.

== Teams ==
The game featured Utah State from the Mountain West Conference and North Texas from Conference USA (C-USA). This was the eighth all-time meeting against the Mean Green and the Aggies, with Utah State leading the series, 4–3; this meeting was the first in a bowl game.

=== Utah State ===
Utah State accepted a bid to the New Mexico Bowl on December 2. The Aggies entered the bowl with a 10–2 record (7–1 in conference). Due to the resignation of head coach Matt Wells, who accepted the same position with the Texas Tech Red Raiders on November 29, the Aggies were coached in the bowl game by interim head coach Frank Maile. Utah State previously appeared in the 2014 New Mexico Bowl, defeating UTEP.

=== North Texas ===
North Texas accepted a bid to the New Mexico Bowl on December 2. The Mean Green entered the bowl with a 9–3 record (5–3 in conference). This was the first appearance by North Texas in a New Mexico Bowl.

== Game summary ==
=== Scoring summary ===
Scoring summary

Quarter	Time	Drive			Team	Scoring information	Score	
Quarter	Time	Plays	Yards	TOP	Team	Scoring information	USU	NT
1	14:20	3	75	0:40	USU	Aaren Vaughns 72-yard touchdown reception from Jordan Love, Dominik Eberle kick good	7	0
1	2:52	10	78	4:44	NT	DeAndre Torrey 2-yard touchdown run, Cole Hedlund kick good	7	7
1	1:59	5	41	0:44	USU	Gerold Bright 26-yard touchdown run, Dominik Eberle kick good	14	7
2	12:08	10	78	2:41	USU	Jordan Love 9-yard touchdown run, Dominik Eberle kick good	21	7
2	9:43	2	52	0:28	USU	Aaren Vaughns 37-yard touchdown reception from Jordan Love, Dominik Eberle kick good	28	7
2	8:55	3	67	0:38	USU	Jalen Greene 67-yard touchdown reception from Jordan Love, Dominik Eberle kick good	35	7
2	0:00	13	23	3:04	USU	42-yard field goal by Dominik Eberle	38	7
3	14:50	1	75	0:10	NT	Jalen Guyton 75-yard touchdown reception from Kason Martin, Cole Hedlund kick blocked	38	13
3	5:01	4	42	0:50	USU	Gerold Bright 3-yard touchdown run, Dominik Eberle kick good	45	13
4	8:30	15	90	7:10	USU	Ron'quavion Tarver 13-yard touchdown reception from Jordan Love, Dominik Eberle kick good	52	13
"TOP" = time of possession. For other American football terms, see Glossary of American football.							52	13

=== Statistics ===
	1	2	3	4	Total
Aggies	14	24	7	7	52
Mean Green	7	0	6	0	13

Statistics	USU	NT
First downs	25	19
Plays–yards	83–556	75–313
Rushes–yards	40–197	41–120
Passing yards	359	193
Passing: Comp–Att–Int	21–43–1	17–34–4
Time of possession	26:33	32:45

Team	Category	Player	Statistics
Utah State	Passing	Jordan Love	21/43, 359 yds, 4 TD, 1 INT
Utah State	Rushing	Gerold Bright	16 car, 103 yds, 2 TD
Utah State	Receiving	Jalen Greene	6 rec, 151 yds, 1 TD
North Texas	Passing	Kason Martin	7/12, 110 yds, 1 TD
North Texas	Rushing	Anthony Wyche	7 car, 53 yds
North Texas	Receiving	Jalen Guyton	4 rec, 103 yds, 1 TD
