= Jalen Davis =

American football player (born 1996)

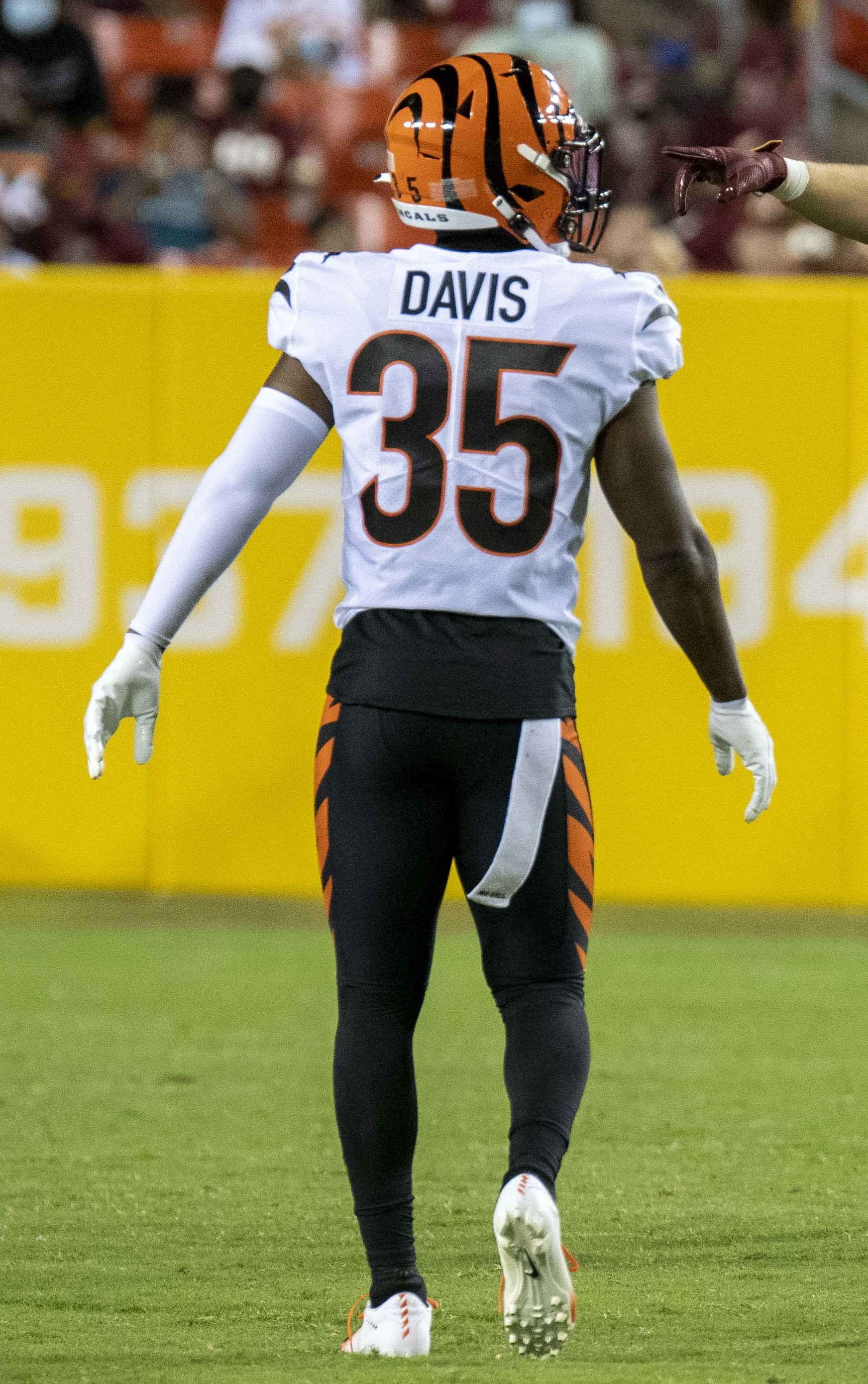
- Davis with the Cincinnati Bengals in 2021

No. 35 – Cincinnati Bengals
- Position: Cornerback
- Roster status: Injured reserve

Personal information
- Born: February 2, 1996 (age 30); Honolulu, Hawaii, U.S.
- Listed height: 5 ft 10 in (1.78 m)
- Listed weight: 186 lb (84 kg)

Career information
- High school: Helix (La Mesa, California)
- College: Utah State (2014–2017)
- NFL draft: 2018: undrafted

Career history
- Miami Dolphins (2018); Arizona Cardinals (2019–2020); Cincinnati Bengals (2020–present)

Awards and highlights
- First-team All-American (2017); First-team All-MWC (2017)

Career NFL statistics as of 2025
- Total tackles: 47
- Sacks: 2
- Forced fumbles: 3
- Fumble recoveries: 2
- Pass deflections: 3
- Interceptions: 1
- Stats at Pro Football Reference

Jalen Davis (born February 2, 1996) is an American professional football cornerback for the Cincinnati Bengals of the National Football League (NFL). He played college football for the Utah State Aggies.

== Early life ==
Davis was born in Hawaii, but grew up in La Mesa, California, and attended Helix High School. At Helix, Davis played both cornerback and wide receiver and returned kicks and punts for the Scotties. As a senior, he was named the Grossmont Conference Defensive Player of the Year after making 45 tackles and was also first-team all-conference on offense after catching 48 passes for 649 yards and four touchdowns with four punts and two kickoffs returned for touchdowns.

== College career ==
Davis played four seasons for the Utah State Aggies, who were the only FBS school to offer him a scholarship. As a senior, Davis intercepted five passes, three of which he returned for a touchdown, with 12 passes broken up and held quarterbacks to a passer rating of 30.5 when targeted. At the end of the season he was named first-team All-Mountain West Conference and a Walter Camp Foundation First-team All-American and a second-team All-American by The Associated Press and the Football Writers Association of America (FWAA). Over the course of his collegiate career, Davis played in 48 games accumulated 181 tackles with 37 pass deflections and 11 interceptions, four of which he returned for touchdowns.

== Professional career ==
Pre-draft measurables
Height	Weight	Arm length	Hand span	Wingspan	40-yard dash	10-yard split	20-yard split	20-yard shuttle	Three-cone drill	Vertical jump	Broad jump	Bench press
5 ft 9 3/8 in (1.76 m)	181 lb (82 kg)	29 1/2 in (0.75 m)	9 1/8 in (0.23 m)	5 ft 10 3/8 in (1.79 m)	4.44 s	1.58 s	2.60 s	4.50 s	7.04 s	36.0 in (0.91 m)	10 ft 0 in (3.05 m)	11 reps
All values from Pro Day

=== Miami Dolphins ===
Davis signed with the Miami Dolphins as an undrafted free agent on April 30, 2018. He was cut from the team at the end of the preseason and subsequently re-signed to the team's practice squad on September 2. Davis was promoted to the Dolphins' active roster on December 8. Davis made his NFL debut on December 9, in a 34–33 win over the New England Patriots. Davis made his first career tackle, a sack, and forced a fumble against the Jacksonville Jaguars on December 23. He was released by the Dolphins during final roster cuts on August 31, 2019.

=== Arizona Cardinals ===
Davis was signed to the Arizona Cardinals practice squad on September 3, 2019. He was promoted to the active roster on December 7.

On August 31, 2020, Davis was waived by the Cardinals. He was re-signed to the Cardinals' practice squad on September 16. He was released on October 20.

=== Cincinnati Bengals ===
On October 27, 2020, Davis was signed to the Cincinnati Bengals practice squad. He was elevated to the active roster on November 14 and November 21 for the team's weeks 10 and 11 games against the Pittsburgh Steelers and Washington Football Team, and reverted to the practice squad after each game. He was promoted to the active roster on November 28.

Davis signed a one-year contract extension with the Bengals on March 3, 2021. Davis' role with the Bengals is as a backup slot cornerback, behind Mike Hilton on the depth chart.

On March 9, 2023, Davis signed a two-year contract extension with the Bengals.

Davis was waived by the Bengals on August 27, 2024, and re-signed to the practice squad. On February 5, 2025, Davis re-signed with Cincinnati on a reserve/futures contract.

On August 26, 2025, Davis was released by the Bengals as part of final roster cuts and re-signed to the practice squad the next day. He was promoted to the active roster on December 1.

On February 20, 2026, Davis signed a one-year contract extension with the Bengals.
