= Mark Neely =

American sportscaster

- Education: University of Kansas
- Occupation: Sportscaster
- Spouse: Christine
- Children: Trevor

Mark Neely is an American sportscaster. He currently serves as a play-by-play announcer for ESPN College Football, College Basketball on ESPN and NBA on ESPN and was previously a television announcer for San Diego Padres baseball.

== Biography ==
=== Education ===
Neely attended the University of Missouri and the University of Kansas graduating from KU.

=== Early career ===
Neely served as a radio and television play-by-play voice for a number of Minor League teams, including the Boise Hawks, Springfield (IL) Cardinals, Salem Avalanche, Louisville Redbirds, and Tulsa Drillers.

=== ESPN ===
Neely's first network television assignment came for ESPN TV calling Major League Baseball in 2001. He added other sports for the network including college football and college basketball while also calling NCAA Regionals and NCAA Super Regionals in college baseball and softball. In 2006 and 2007, Neely was the play-by-play announcer for the NCAA Men's & Women's Swimming & Diving National Championships.

Neely has also called a number of college football bowl games for ESPN - 2010 New Orleans Bowl, 2012 Little Caesars Pizza Bowl, 2014 New Mexico Bowl, 2014 Quick Lane Bowl, 2015 Celebration Bowl, and the 2015 Famous Idaho Potato Bowl on ESPN TV - and the 2010 Chick-fil-A Bowl, 2011 & 2012 New Mexico Bowl, 2012 BBVA Compass Bowl, 2012 Alamo Bowl, 2013 Armed Forces Bowl, 2014 & 2016 Liberty Bowl, 2014 Music City Bowl, and 2015 Cactus Bowl on ESPN Radio.

=== Big Ten Network ===
In 2007, Neely was hired by Fox's Big Ten Network to call NCAA sports such as Basketball and Football.

=== ESPN Little League Baseball ===
Neely has called Little League Baseball games for ESPN since 2001. In 2010-2014 he called the West Region and Northwest Regional Semifinals and Finals for ESPN along with Aaron Boone. In 2015, Neely broadcast those same regions along with Dallas Braden and in 2016 with Raul Ibanez.

=== San Diego Padres ===
In 2009, Neely replaced Matt Vasgersian as the lead play-by-play voice for San Diego Padres telecasts on 4SD, while in 2010-11 he was the team's secondary TV announcer behind Dick Enberg.

== Personal life ==
Neely and his wife Christine have a son Trevor, born in 2002. Mark is a native of St. Louis, Missouri, and a graduate of Parkway West High School, the same school that produced fellow broadcasters Stone Phillips and Chip Caray.

== See also ==
- List of San Diego Padres broadcasters
