= 2018 North Texas Mean Green football team =

American college football season

2018 North Texas Mean Green football
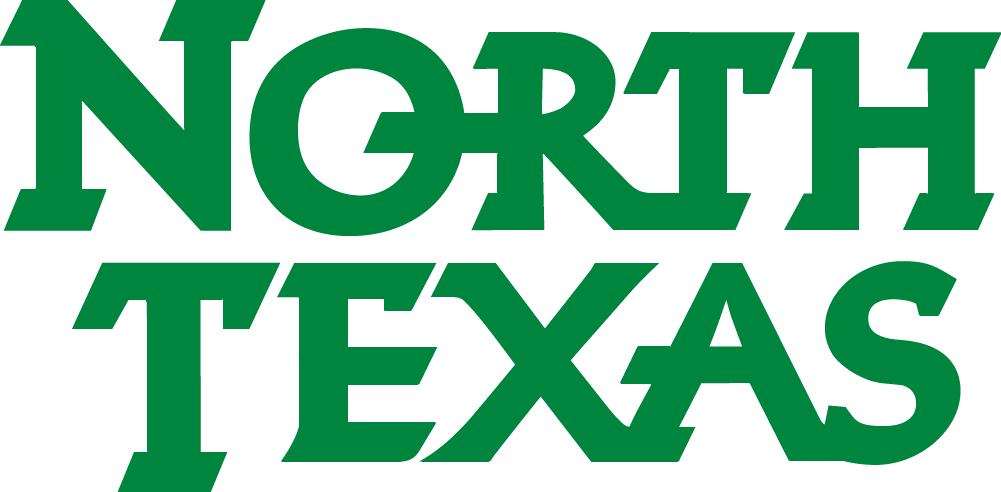

New Mexico Bowl, L 13–52 vs. Utah State
- Conference: Conference USA
- West Division
- Record: 9–4 (5–3 C-USA)
- Head coach: Seth Littrell (3rd season)
- Offensive coordinator: Graham Harrell (3rd season)
- Offensive scheme: Spread
- Defensive coordinator: Troy Reffett (3rd season)
- Base defense: 3–3–5
- Home stadium: Apogee Stadium

2018 Conference USA football standings
| | Conf. | | | Overall |
| Team | W | | L | W | | L |
|---|---|---|---|---|---|---|
East Division
| Middle Tennessee x | 7 | – | 1 | 8 | – | 6 |
| FIU | 6 | – | 2 | 9 | – | 4 |
| Marshall | 6 | – | 2 | 9 | – | 4 |
| Charlotte | 4 | – | 4 | 5 | – | 7 |
| Florida Atlantic | 3 | – | 5 | 5 | – | 7 |
| Old Dominion | 2 | – | 6 | 4 | – | 8 |
| Western Kentucky | 2 | – | 6 | 3 | – | 9 |
West Division
| UAB x$ | 7 | – | 1 | 11 | – | 3 |
| North Texas | 5 | – | 3 | 9 | – | 4 |
| Louisiana Tech | 5 | – | 3 | 8 | – | 5 |
| Southern Miss | 5 | – | 3 | 6 | – | 5 |
| UTSA | 2 | – | 6 | 3 | – | 9 |
| UTEP | 1 | – | 7 | 1 | – | 11 |
| Rice | 1 | – | 7 | 2 | – | 11 |
Championship: UAB 27, Middle Tennessee 25
$ – Conference champion; x – Division champion/co-champions

The 2018 North Texas Mean Green football team represented the University of North Texas as a member of Conference USA (C-USA) during the 2018 NCAA Division I FBS football season. Led by third-year head coach Seth Littrell, the Mean Green compiled an overall record of 9–4 with a mark 5–3 in conference play, placing in a three-way tie for second in C-USA's West Division. North Texas was invited to the New Mexico Bowl, where the Mean Green lost to Utah State. The team played home games at Apogee Stadium in Denton, Texas.

Following a 44–17 victory over Arkansas, which improved the team's record to 3–0, the Mean Green received votes in both the AP poll and the Coaches Poll. It was the first since the 2013 season that North Texas received votes in a major poll.

== Schedule ==
North Texas announced its 2018 football schedule on January 23, 2018. The schedule consisted of six home and six away games in the regular season.

| Date | Time | Opponent | Site | TV | Result | Attendance |
|---|---|---|---|---|---|---|
| September 1 | 6:30 p.m. | SMU* | Apogee Stadium; Denton, TX (Safeway Bowl) | Stadium | W 46–23 | 29,515 |
| September 8 | 6:30 p.m. | Incarnate Word* | Apogee Stadium; Denton, TX | ESPN+ | W 58–16 | 18,538 |
| September 15 | 3:00 p.m. | at Arkansas* | Donald W. Reynolds Razorback Stadium; Fayetteville, AR | SECN | W 44–17 | 62,355 |
| September 22 | 5:00 p.m. | at Liberty* | Williams Stadium; Lynchburg, VA | ESPN3 | W 47–7 | 14,112 |
| September 29 | 6:30 p.m. | Louisiana Tech | Apogee Stadium; Denton, TX | beIN | L 27–29 | 30,105 |
| October 6 | 6:30 p.m. | at UTEP | Sun Bowl; El Paso, TX | beIN | W 27–24 | 12,809 |
| October 13 | 1:30 p.m. | Southern Miss | Apogee Stadium; Denton, TX | ESPN3 | W 30–7 | 18,252 |
| October 20 | 6:30 p.m. | at UAB | Legion Field; Birmingham, AL | beIN | L 21–29 | 28,014 |
| October 27 | 3:00 p.m. | Rice^{†} | Apogee Stadium; Denton, TX | ESPN+ | W 41–17 | 25,375 |
| November 10 | 2:30 p.m. | at Old Dominion | Foreman Field; Norfolk, VA | ESPN3 | L 31–34 | 18,062 |
| November 15 | 8:30 p.m. | Florida Atlantic | Apogee Stadium; Denton, TX | CBSSN | W 41–38 | 18,338 |
| November 24 | 6:00 p.m. | at UTSA | Alamodome; San Antonio, TX | ESPN+ | W 24–21 | 19,874 |
| December 15 | 1:00 p.m. | vs. Utah State* | Dreamstyle Stadium; Albuquerque, NM (New Mexico Bowl) | ESPN | L 13–52 | 25,387 |
*Non-conference game; ^{†}Homecoming; All times are in Central time

== Preseason ==
=== Coaching changes ===
Tashard Choice was named running backs coach.

=== Award watch lists ===
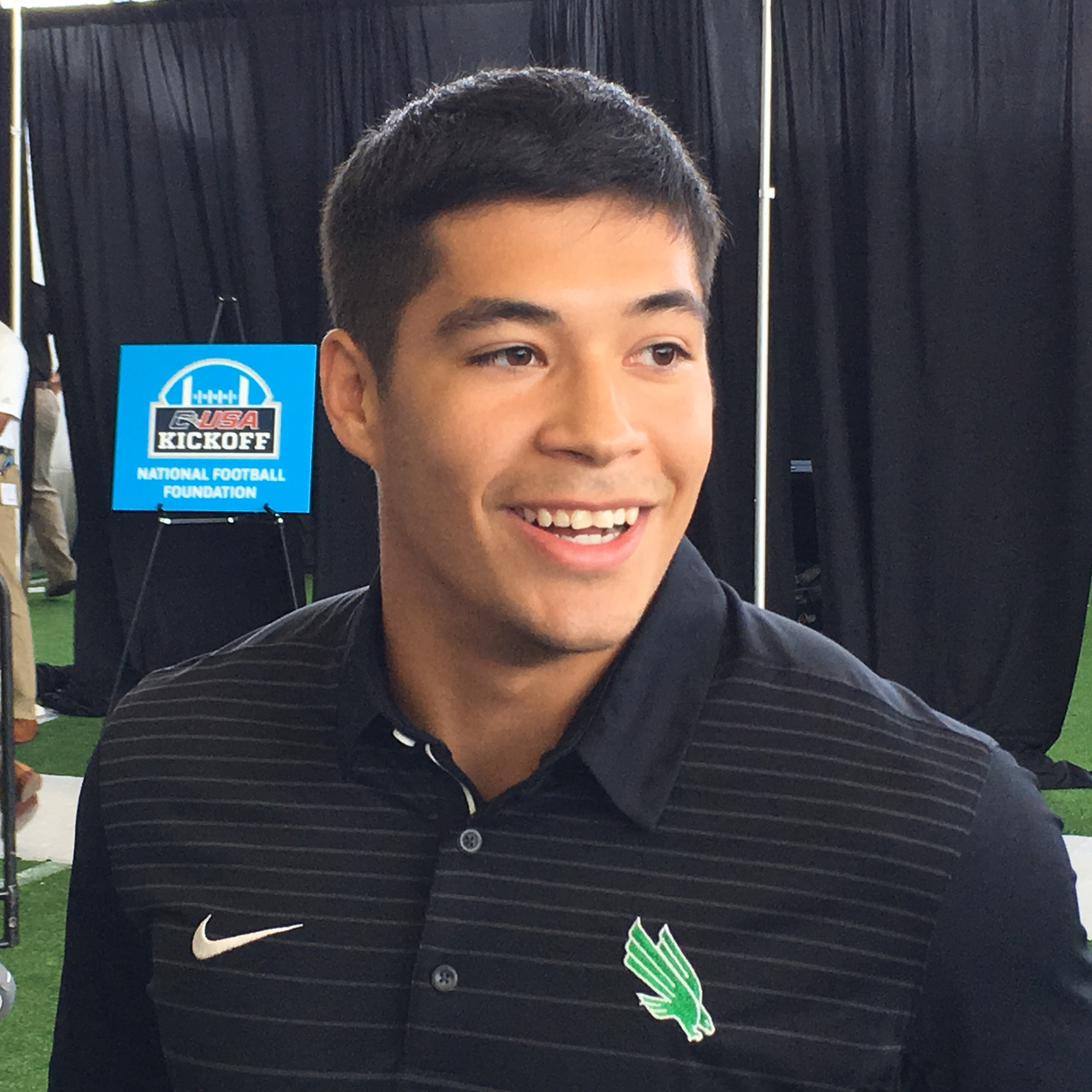
UNT QB Mason Fine at 2018 C-USA media days

Listed in the order that they were released

| Award | Player | Position | Year |
|---|---|---|---|
| Rimington Trophy | Sosaia Mose | C | JR |
| Maxwell Award | Mason Fine | QB | JR |
| Davey O'Brien Award | Mason Fine | QB | JR |
| Fred Biletnikoff Award | Jalen Guyton | WR | JR |
| Fred Biletnikoff Award | Michael Lawrence | WR | JR |
| John Mackey Award | Kelvin Smith | TE | JR |
| Paul Hornung Award | Kelvin Smith | TE | JR |
| Wuerffel Trophy | Quinn Shanbour | QB | SR |
| Walter Camp Award | Mason Fine | QB | JR |
| Manning Award | Mason Fine | QB | JR |
| Earl Campbell Tyler Rose Award | Mason Fine | QB | JR |

=== Preseason All-CUSA team ===
Conference USA released their preseason all-CUSA team on July 16, 2018, with the Mean Green having two players selected.

Offense

Mason Fine – QB

Jalen Guyton – WR

=== Preseason media poll ===
Conference USA released their preseason media poll on July 17, 2018, with the Mean Green predicted to finish as champions of the West Division.

== Game summaries ==
=== SMU ===
SMU Mustangs at North Texas Mean Green

| Quarter | 1 | 2 | 3 | 4 | Total |
|---|---|---|---|---|---|
| Mustangs | 0 | 0 | 0 | 23 | 23 |
| Mean Green | 14 | 6 | 16 | 10 | 46 |

at Apogee Stadium • Denton, TX

- Date: September 1
- Game time: 6:30 p.m.
- Game weather: Temperature: 93 °F (34 °C) • Weather: partly cloudy • Wind: SE 12 MPH
- Game attendance: 29,519
- Referee: Tracy Jones
- TV announcers (Stadium): Chris Hassel (play-by-play), A. J. Hawk (color), Kristen Balboni (reporter)

Game information

First Quarter

- UNT – Jalen Guyton 15-yard pass from Mason Fine (Cole Hedlund kick), 8:34. Mean Green 7–0. Drive: 10 plays, 49 yards, 5:12.
- UNT – Kemon Hall 36-yard interception return (Cole Hedlund kick), 5:37. Mean Green 14–0.

Second Quarter

- UNT – Cole Hedlund 40-yard field goal, 11:47. Mean Green 17–0. Drive: 17 plays, 59 yards, 7:08.
- UNT – Cole Hedlund 18-yard field goal, 0:00. Mean Green 20–0. Drive: 15 plays, 93 yards, 5:22.

Third Quarter

- UNT – Nic Smith 5-yard pass from Mason Fine (Cole Hedlund kick), 11:17. Mean Green 27–0. Drive: 9 plays, 75 yards, 3:43.
- UNT – Jalen Guyton 17-yard pass from Mason Fine (two-point conversion failed), 6:04. Mean Green 33–0. Drive: 9 plays, 95 yards, 4:02.
- UNT – Cole Hedlund 41-yard field goal, 0:19. Mean Green 36–0. Drive: 10 plays, 52 yards, 4:13.

Fourth Quarter

- SMU – Braeden West 5-yard run (Will Moore kick), 8:11. Mean Green 36–7. Drive: 6 plays, 63 yards, 1:39.
- UNT – Cole Hedlund 51-yard field goal, 3:29. Mean Green 39–7. Drive: 8 plays, 40 yards, 4:42.
- SMU – James Proche 59-yard pass from Ben Hicks (Hicks to Roberson for two-point conversion), 1:41. Mean Green 39–15. Drive: 4 plays, 74 yards, 1:48.
- UNT – DeAndre Torrey 96-yard kick return (Cole Hedlund kick), 1:28. Mean Green 46–15.
- SMU – Braeden West 71-yard pass from Ben Hicks (Hicks to Proche for two-point conversion), 1:09. Mean Green 46–23. Drive: 1 play, 71 yards, 0:00.

Top Passers

- SMU – Ben Hicks – 12/24, 252 yards, 2 TD, INT
- UNT – Mason Fine – 40/50, 444 yards, 3 TD

Top Rushers

- SMU – Braeden West – 8 carries, 26 yards, TD
- UNT – Loren Easly – 12 carries, 31 yards

Top Receiving

- SMU – Braeden West – 3 receptions, 81 yards, TD
- UNT – Rico Bussey, Jr. – 9 receptions, 109 yards

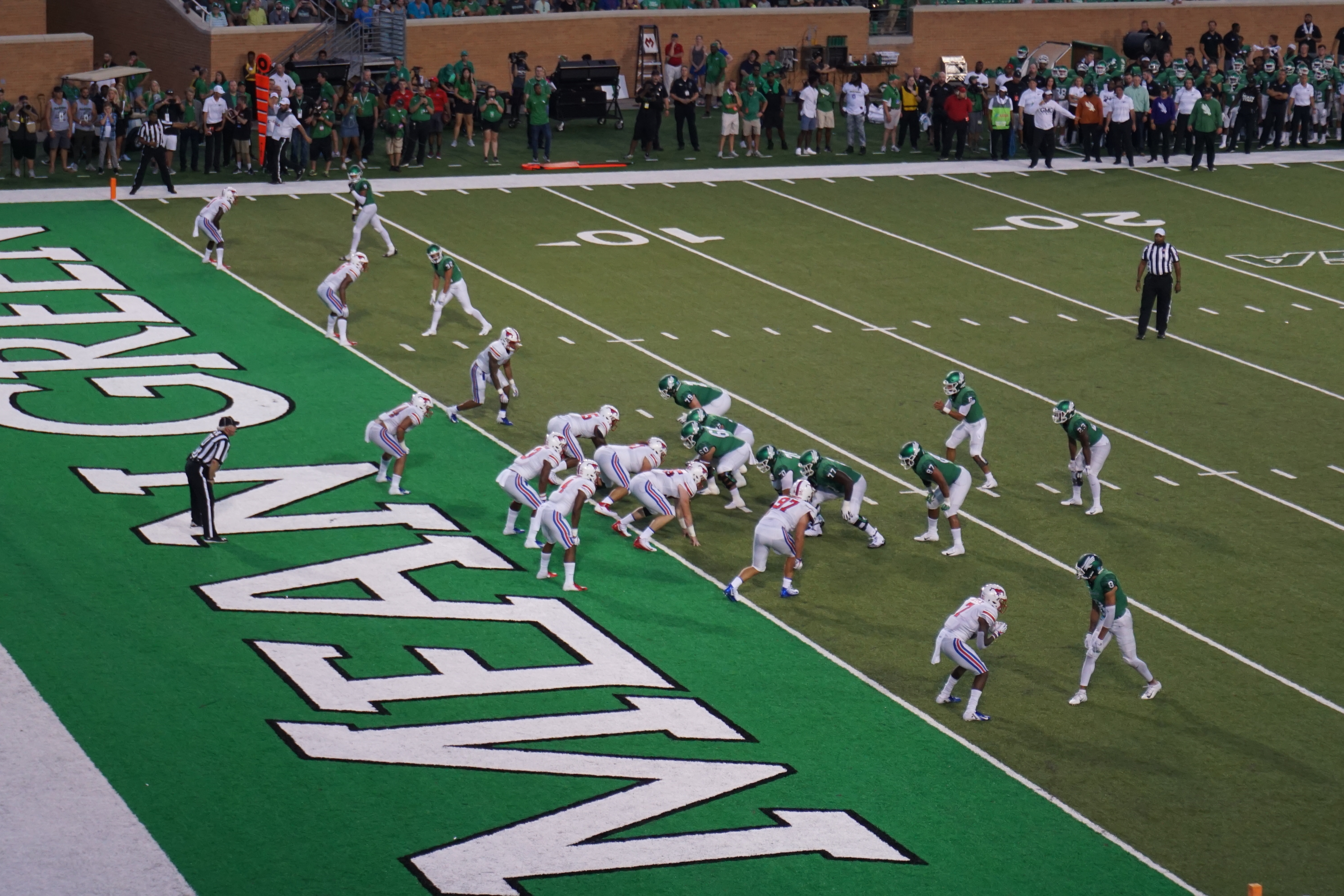
North Texas in action against SMU

The Mean Green's offense went off with 529 total yards, including 444 passing yards from junior quarterback Mason Fine. North Texas's defense held SMU's offense to only 256 yards, forced a turnover, and held the Mustangs scoreless through the first three quarters. 29,519 people attended the game, setting an attendance record at Apogee Stadium. This record would be broken 4 weeks later against Louisiana Tech.

=== Incarnate Word ===
Incarnate Word Cardinals vs. North Texas Mean Green

| Quarter | 1 | 2 | 3 | 4 | Total |
|---|---|---|---|---|---|
| Cardinals | 6 | 0 | 10 | 0 | 16 |
| Mean Green | 10 | 31 | 14 | 3 | 58 |

at Apogee Stadium • Denton, TX

- Date: September 8
- Game time: 6:30 p.m.
- Game weather: Temperature: 75 °F (24 °C) • Weather: overcast • Wind: N 5 MPH
- Game attendance: 18,538
- Referee: Joe Lehring
- TV: ESPN+

Game information

First Quarter

- UNT – DeAndre Torrey 1-yard run (Cole Hedlund kick), 10:08. Mean Green 7–0. Drive: 15 plays, 75 yards, 4:52.
- UNT – Cole Hedlund 29-yard field goal, 6:22. Mean Green 10–0. Drive: 6 plays, 45 yards, 2:06.
- UIW – Ra'Quanne Dickens 55-yard run (Cody Seidel PAT blocked), 5:32. Mean Green 10–6. Drive: 3 plays, 75 yards, 0:50.

Second Quarter

- UNT – DeAndre Torrey 1-yard run (Cole Hedlund kick), 14:28. Mean Green 17–6. Drive: 8 plays, 38 yards, 3:00.
- UNT – Jalen Guyton 15-yard pass from Mason Fine (Cole Hedlund kick), 10:48. Mean Green 24–6. Drive: 4 plays, 46 yards, 1:07.
- UNT – DeAndre Torrey 1-yard run (Cole Hedlund kick), 6:56. Mean Green 31–6. Drive: 7 plays, 84 yards, 2:20.
- UNT – Rico Bussey, Jr. 13-yard pass from Mason Fine (Cole Hedlund kick), 1:11. Mean Green 38–6. Drive: 5 plays, 29 yards, 1:45.
- UNT – Cole Hedlund 27-yard field goal, 0:00. Mean Green 41–6. Drive: 7 plays, 46 yards, 0:47.

Third Quarter

- UIW – Cody Seidel 29-yard field goal, 9:15. Mean Green 41–9. Drive: 13 plays, 72 yards, 5:45.
- UNT – Rico Bussey, Jr. 35-yard pass from Mason Fine (Cole Hedlund kick), 8:02. Mean Green 48–9. Drive: 3 plays, 68 yards, 1:13.
- UNT – Rico Bussey, Jr. 3-yard pass from Mason Fine (Cole Hedlund kick), 6:04. Mean Green 55–9. Drive: 2 plays, 49 yards, 0:22.
- UIW – Ra'Quanne Dickens 42-yard run (Cody Seidel kick), 2:30. Mean Green 55–16. Drive: 8 plays, 75 yards, 3:34.

Fourth Quarter

- UNT – Cole Hedlund 25-yard field goal, 12:49. Mean Green 58–16. Drive: 12 plays, 65 yards, 4:41.

Top Passers

- UIW – Jon Copeland – 16/30, 152 yards, 2 INT
- UNT – Mason Fine – 25/40, 418 yards, 4 TD, INT

Top Rushers

- UIW – Ra'Quanne Dickens – 18 carries, 139 yards, 2 TD
- UNT – DeAndre Torrey – 16 carries, 44 yards, 3 TD

Top Receiving

- UIW – Phillip Baptiste – 6 receptions, 79 yards
- UNT – Rico Bussey, Jr. – 8 receptions, 128 yards, 3 TD

=== At Arkansas ===
North Texas Mean Green at Arkansas Razorbacks

| Quarter | 1 | 2 | 3 | 4 | Total |
|---|---|---|---|---|---|
| Mean Green | 17 | 17 | 3 | 7 | 44 |
| Razorbacks | 0 | 10 | 0 | 7 | 17 |

at Donald W. Reynolds Razorback Stadium • Fayetteville, AR

- Date: September 15
- Game time: 3:00 p.m.
- Game weather: Temperature: 88 °F (31 °C) • Weather: partly cloudy • Wind: NNE 6 MPH
- Game attendance: 62,335
- Referee: Matt Loeffler
- TV announcers (SECN): Dave LaMont (play-by-play), Ray Bentley (color), Tera Talmadge (reporter)

Game information

First Quarter

- UNT – Mason Fine 2-yard run (Cole Hedlund kick), 9:36. Mean Green 7–0. Drive: 7 plays, 44 yards, 1:43.
- UNT – Keegan Brewer 90-yard punt return (Cole Hedlund kick), 6:49. Mean Green 14–0.
- UNT – Cole Hedlund 24-yard field goal, 5:04. Mean Green 17–0. Drive: 4 plays, 1 yard, 0:55.

Second Quarter

- ARK – Cole Kelly 5-yard run (Connor Limpert kick), 14:08. Mean Green 17–7. Drive: 7 plays, 61 yards, 1:36.
- ARK – Connor Limpert 54-yard field goal, 9:27. Mean Green 17–10. Drive: 10 plays, 49 yards, 2:55.
- UNT – Loren Easly 3-yard run (Cole Hedlund kick), 7:21. Mean Green 24–10. Drive: 2 plays, 34 yards, 0:30.
- UNT – Rico Bussey, Jr. 7-yard pass from Mason Fine (Cole Hedlund kick), 2:55. Mean Green 31–10. Drive: 8 plays, 80 yards, 2:46.
- UNT – Cole Hedlund 26-yard field goal, 0:10. Mean Green 34–10. Drive: 7 plays, 40 yards, 1:26.

Third Quarter

- UNT – Cole Hedlund 20-yard field goal, 9:26. Mean Green 37–10. Drive: 14 plays, 72 yards, 5:34.

Fourth Quarter

- UNT – Kemon Hall 24-yard interception return (Cole Hedlund kick), 7:42. Mean Green 44–10.
- ARK – Maleek Williams 68-yard run (Connor Limpert kick), 0:53. Mean Green 44–17. Drive: 1 play, 68 yards, 0:12.

Top Passers

- UNT – Mason Fine – 24/45, 281 yards, TD
- ARK – Cole Kelley – 16/35, 185 yards, 4 INT

Top Rushers

- UNT – Loren Easly – 13 carries, 68 yards, TD
- ARK – Maleek Williams – 5 carries, 74 yards, TD

Top Receiving

- UNT – Jaelon Darden – 5 receptions, 87 yards
- ARK – Michael Woods – 4 receptions, 61 yards

=== At Liberty ===
North Texas Mean Green at Liberty Flames

| Quarter | 1 | 2 | 3 | 4 | Total |
|---|---|---|---|---|---|
| Mean Green | 14 | 7 | 6 | 20 | 47 |
| Flames | 0 | 7 | 0 | 0 | 7 |

at Williams Stadium • Lynchburg, VA

- Date: September 22
- Game time: 5:00 p.m. CDT/6:00 p.m. EDT
- Game weather: Temperature: 73 °F (23 °C) • Weather: rainy • Wind: NNE 11 MPH
- Game attendance: 14,112
- Referee: Gary Patterson
- TV: ESPN3

Game information

First Quarter

- UNT – Jaelon Darden 6-yard pass from Mason Fine (Cole Hedlund kick), 10:07. Mean Green 7–0. Drive: 6 plays, 70 yards, 2:24.
- UNT – Rico Bussey Jr. 22-yard pass from Mason Fine (Cole Hedlund kick), 4:41. Mean Green 14–0. Drive: 8 plays, 46 yards, 2:55.

Second Quarter

- LIB – B.J. Farrow 4-yard pass from Stephen Calvert (Aaron Peart kick), 7:30. Mean Green 14–7. Drive: 4 plays, 67 yards, 1:09.
- UNT – Mason Fine 4-yard run (Cole Hedlund kick), 0:12. Mean Green 21–7. Drive: 6 plays, 59 yards, 1:20.

Third Quarter

- UNT – Loren Easly 9-yard run (PAT no good), 5:09. Mean Green 27–7. Drive: 6 plays, 80 yards, 2:21.

Fourth Quarter

- UNT – Loren Easly 3-yard run (two-point conversion no good), 13:34. Mean Green 33–7. Drive: 6 plays, 46 yards, 2:16.
- UNT – DeAndre Torrey 1-yard run (Cole Hedlund kick), 10:32. Mean Green 40–7. Drive: 4 plays, 22 yards, 1:38.
- UNT – Nic Smith 66-yard run (Cole Hedlund kick), 6:21. Mean Green 47–7. Drive: 2 plays, 66 yards, 0:21.

Top Passers

- UNT – Mason Fine – 16/27, 185 yards, 2 TD
- LIB – Stephen Calvert – 16/39, 222 yards, TD, INT

Top Rushers

- UNT – Loren Easly – 27 carries, 177 yards, 2 TD
- LIB – Frankie Hickson – 21 carries, 96 yards

Top Receiving

- UNT – Jaelon Darden – 4 receptions, 65 yards, TD
- LIB – D.J. Stubbs – 6 receptions, 95 yards

Kickoff was delayed until 6:48 p.m. due to rain and lightning. With the victory, the Mean Green started a season 4–0 for the first time since 1966.

=== Louisiana Tech ===
Louisiana Tech Bulldogs at North Texas Mean Green

| Quarter | 1 | 2 | 3 | 4 | Total |
|---|---|---|---|---|---|
| Bulldogs | 6 | 20 | 3 | 0 | 29 |
| Mean Green | 21 | 0 | 6 | 0 | 27 |

at Apogee Stadium • Denton, TX

- Date: September 29
- Game time: 6:30 p.m.
- Game weather: Temperature: 75 °F (24 °C) • Weather: overcast • Wind: ESE 9 MPH
- Game attendance: 30,105
- Referee: Ken Antee
- TV: beIN

Game information

First Quarter

- UNT – Michael Lawrence 36-yard pass from Mason Fine (Cole Hedlund kick), 11:57. Mean Green 7–0. Drive: 8 plays, 80 yards, 3:03.
- LTU – Bailey Hale 28-yard field goal, 10:25. Mean Green 7–3. Drive: 6 plays, 64 yards, 1:32.
- UNT – Rico Bussey Jr. 9-yard pass from Mason Fine (Cole Hedlund kick), 4:24. Mean Green 14–3. Drive: 8 plays, 88 yards, 3:50.
- LTU – Bailey Hale 37-yard field goal, 3:04. Mean Green 14–6. Drive: 5 plays, 45 yards, 1:20.
- UNT – Loren Easly 9-yard run (Cole Hedlund kick), 1:28. Mean Green 21–6. Drive: 4 plays, 62 yards, 1:36.

Second Quarter

- LTU – Bailey Hale 22-yard field goal, 9:30. Mean Green 21–9. Drive: 18 plays, 79 yards, 6:58.
- LTU – Adrian Hardy 8-yard pass from J'Mar Smith (Bailey Hale kick), 4:30. Mean Green 21–16. Drive: 8 plays, 80 yards, 4:00.
- LTU – Bailey Hale 28-yard field goal, 1:30. Mean Green 21–19. Drive: 5 plays, 36 yards, 1:34.
- LTU – Alfred Smith 5-yard pass from J'Mar Smith (Bailey Hale kick), 0:32. Bulldogs 26–21. Drive: 1 play, 5 yards, 0:05.

Third Quarter

- LTU – Bailey Hale 42-yard field goal, 7:08. Bulldogs 29–21. Drive: 9 plays, 36 yards, 3:43.
- UNT – Rico Bussey Jr. 9-yard pass from Mason Fine (two-point conversion failed), 1:57. Bulldogs 29–27. Drive: 11 plays, 70 yards, 5:11.

Fourth Quarter

- No scoring plays

Top Passers

- LTU – J'Mar Smith – 20/39, 230 yards, 2 TD
- UNT – Mason Fine – 22/35, 296 yards, 3 TD

Top Rushers

- LTU – Israel Tucker – 15 carries, 95 yards
- UNT – Loren Easly – 22 carries, 110 yards, TD

Top Receiving

- LTU – Rhashid Bonnette – 5 receptions, 101 yards
- UNT – Rico Bussey Jr. – 9 receptions, 112 yards, 2 TD

=== At UTEP ===
North Texas Mean Green at UTEP Miners

| Quarter | 1 | 2 | 3 | 4 | Total |
|---|---|---|---|---|---|
| Mean Green | 7 | 3 | 10 | 7 | 27 |
| Miners | 3 | 7 | 0 | 14 | 24 |

at Sun Bowl • El Paso, TX

- Date: October 6
- Game time: 6:30 p.m.
- Game weather: Temperature: 86 °F (30 °C) • Weather: sunny • Wind: SW 11 MPH
- Game attendance: 12,809
- Referee: Daniel Gautreau
- TV: beIN

Game information

First Quarter

- UTEP – Jason Filley 37-yard field goal, 12:05. Miners 3–0. Drive: 9 plays, 55 yards, 2:55.
- UNT – Jaelon Darden 18-yard pass from Mason Fine (Cole Hedlund kick), 1:41. Mean Green 7–3. Drive: 7 plays, 69 yards, 3:28.

Second Quarter

- UTEP – Quardraiz Wadley 29-yard pass from Ryan Metz (Jason Filley kick), 12:54. Miners 10–7. Drive: 8 plays, 82 yards, 3:42.
- UNT – Cole Hedlund 52-yard field goal, 3:12. Tied 10–10. Drive: 7 plays, 23 yards, 2:43.

Third Quarter

- UNT – Cole Hedlund 29-yard field goal, 7:51. Mean Green 13–10. Drive: 13 plays, 63 yards, 7:09.
- UNT – Rico Bussey Jr. 11-yard pass from Mason Fine (Cole Hedlund kick), 0:55. Mean Green 20–10. Drive: 5 plays, 65 yards, 2:32.

Fourth Quarter

- UTEP – Ryan Metz 1-yard run (Jason Filley kick), 10:43. Mean Green 20–17. Drive: 12 plays, 90 yards, 5:08.
- UNT – Nic Smith 20-yard run (Cole Hedlund kick), 5:46. Mean Green 27–17. Drive: 9 plays, 75 yards, 4:57.
- UTEP – Kenyan Foster 67-yard pass from Ryan Metz (Jason Filley kick), 5:05. Mean Green 27–24. Drive: 2 plays, 75 yards, 0:41.

Top Passers

- UNT – Mason Fine – 23/34, 294 yards, 2 TD
- UTEP – Ryan Metz – 16/33, 313 yards, 2 TD, 2 INT

Top Rushers

- UNT – DeAndre Torrey – 19 carries, 70 yards
- UTEP – Quardraiz Wadley – 11 carries, 65 yards

Top Receiving

- UNT – Rico Bussey Jr. – 8 receptions, 117 yards, TD
- UTEP – Warren Redix – 7 receptions, 131 yards

=== Southern Miss ===
Southern Miss Golden Eagles at North Texas Mean Green

| Quarter | 1 | 2 | 3 | 4 | Total |
|---|---|---|---|---|---|
| Golden Eagles | 0 | 7 | 0 | 0 | 7 |
| Mean Green | 0 | 10 | 6 | 14 | 30 |

at Apogee Stadium • Denton, TX

- Date: October 13
- Game time: 1:00 p.m.
- Game weather: Temperature: 60 °F (16 °C) • Weather: overcast and rain • Wind: NE 12 MPH
- Game attendance: 18,252
- Referee: Justin Elliot
- TV: ESPN3

Game information

First Quarter

- No scoring plays

Second Quarter

- UNT – Jalen Guyton 53-yard pass from Mason Fine (Cole Hedlund kick), 13:11. Mean Green 7–0. Drive: 8 plays, 99 yards, 2:45.
- USM – Quez Watkins 44-yard pass from Jack Abraham (Parker Shaunfield kick), 11:06. Tied 7–7. Drive: 5 plays, 75 yards, 2:05.
- UNT – Cole Hedlund 41-yard field goal, 7:11. Mean Green 10–7. Drive: 8 plays, 43 yards, 3:55.

Third Quarter

- UNT – DeAndre Torrey 6-yard run (Cole Hedlund PAT blocked), 0:34. Mean Green 16–7. Drive: 9 plays, 68 yards, 3:29.

Fourth Quarter

- UNT – DeAndre Torrey 8-yard run (Cole Hedlund kick), 10:45. Mean Green 23–7. Drive: 7 plays, 48 yards, 3:22.
- UNT – DeAndre Torrey 34-yard run (Cole Hedlund kick), 0:33. Mean Green 30–7. Drive: 6 plays, 58 yards, 2:33.

Top Passers

- USM – Jack Abraham – 29/42, 318 yards, TD, INT
- UNT – Mason Fine – 24/38, 292 yards, TD

Top Rushers

- USM – Trivenskey Mosley – 11 carries, 73 yards
- UNT – DeAndre Torrey – 17 carries, 95 yards, 3 TD

Top Receiving

- USM – Jordan Mitchell – 12 receptions, 135 yards
- UNT – Jalen Guyton – 7 receptions, 124 yards, TD

=== At UAB ===
North Texas Mean Green at UAB Blazers

| Quarter | 1 | 2 | 3 | 4 | Total |
|---|---|---|---|---|---|
| Mean Green | 7 | 14 | 0 | 0 | 21 |
| Blazers | 3 | 7 | 9 | 10 | 29 |

at Legion Field • Birmingham, AL

- Date: October 20
- Game time: 6:30 p.m.
- Game weather: Temperature: 60 °F (16 °C) • Weather: overcast, cool • Wind: 10 MPH
- Game attendance: 28,014
- Referee: Jonathan Noli
- TV: beIN

Game information

First Quarter

- UNT – Rico Bussey Jr. 55-yard pass from Mason Fine (Cole Hedlund kick), 7:58. Mean Green 7–0. Drive: 6 plays, 87 yards, 2:15.
- UAB – Nick Vogel 34-yard field goal, 1:27. Mean Green 7–3. Drive: 16 plays, 74 yards, 6:25.

Second Quarter

- UNT – Jaelon Darden 11-yard pass from Mason Fine (Cole Hedlund kick), 12:40. Mean Green 14–3. Drive: 9 plays, 75 yards, 3:47.
- UAB – Spencer Brown 1-yard run (Nick Vogel kick), 11:48. Mean Green 14–10. Drive: 2 plays, 35 yards, 0:38.
- UNT – Jaelon Darden 24-yard pass from Mason Fine (Cole Hedlund kick), 3:32. Mean Green 21–10. Drive: 5 plays, 49 yards, 2:00.

Third Quarter

- UAB – Garrett Marino safety, 8:07. Mean Green 21–12.
- UAB – Spencer Brown 3-yard run (Nick Vogel kick), 4:29. Mean Green 21–19. Drive: 8 plays, 63 yards, 3:33.

Fourth Quarter

- UAB – Spencer Brown 3-yard run (Nick Vogel kick), 14:16. Blazers 26–21. Drive: 7 plays, 67 yards, 4:13.
- UAB – Nick Vogel 26-yard field goal, 2:10. Blazers 29–21. Drive: 13 plays, 87 yards, 6:14.

Top Passers

- UNT – Mason Fine – 29/40, 336 yards, 3 TD
- UAB – A.J. Erdely – 14/22, 189 yards

Top Rushers

- UNT – DeAndre Torrey – 13 carries, 35 yards
- UAB – Spencer Brown – 25 carries, 100 yards, 3 TD

Top Receiving

- UNT – Jaelon Darden – 10 receptions, 143 yards, 2 TD
- UAB – Andre Wilson – 2 receptions, 39 yards

=== Rice ===
Rice Owls at North Texas Mean Green

| Quarter | 1 | 2 | 3 | 4 | Total |
|---|---|---|---|---|---|
| Owls | 7 | 3 | 7 | 0 | 17 |
| Mean Green | 10 | 7 | 3 | 21 | 41 |

at Apogee Stadium • Denton, TX

- Date: October 27
- Game time: 3:00 p.m.
- Game attendance: 25,379
- Referee: Billy Williams
- TV: ESPN+

Game information

First Quarter

- RICE – Wiley Green 2-yard run (Jack Fox kick), 10:17. Owls 7–0. Drive: 11 plays, 75 yards, 4:43.
- UNT – Cole Hedlund 42-yard field goal, 6:02. Owls 7–3. Drive: 9 plays, 50 yards, 4:15.
- UNT – Rico Bussey Jr. 65-yard pass from Mason Fine (Cole Hedlund kick), 2:09. Mean Green 10–7. Drive: 3 plays, 89 yards, 0:31.

Second Quarter

- UNT – DeAndre Torrey 11-yard run (Cole Hedlund kick), 13:04. Mean Green 17–7. Drive: 4 plays, 85 yards, 1:56.
- RICE – Haden Tobola 27-yard field goal, 0:00. Mean Green 17–10. Drive: 13 plays, 39 yards, 5:05.

Third Quarter

- RICE – Aaron Cephus 3-yard pass from Wiley Green (Jack Fox kick), 12:50. Tied 17–17. Drive: 5 plays, 25 yards, 2:10.
- UNT – Cole Hedlund 23-yard field goal, 0:04. Mean Green 20–17. Drive: 6 plays, 59 yards, 2:28.

Fourth Quarter

- UNT – DeAndre Torrey 5-yard pass from Mason Fine (Cole Hedlund kick), 9:27. Mean Green 27–17. Drive: 11 plays, 95 yards, 3:25.
- UNT – DeAndre Torrey 14-yard run (Cole Hedlund kick), 8:50. Mean Green 34–17. Drive: 1 play, 14 yards, 0:06.
- UNT – DeAndre Torrey 12-yard run (Cole Hedlund kick), 5:35. Mean Green 41–17. Drive: 4 plays, 83 yards, 1:39.

Top Passers

- RICE – Wiley Green – 21/37, 204 yards, TD
- UNT – Mason Fine – 18/35, 333 yards, 2 TD

Top Rushers

- RICE – Juma Otoviano – 17 carries, 64 yards
- UNT – DeAndre Torrey – 15 carries, 130 yards, 4 TD

Top Receiving

- RICE – Austin Trammell – 10 receptions, 94 yards
- UNT – Rico Bussey Jr. – 4 receptions, 145 yards, TD

=== At Old Dominion ===
North Texas Mean Green at Old Dominion Monarchs

| Quarter | 1 | 2 | 3 | 4 | Total |
|---|---|---|---|---|---|
| Mean Green | 14 | 14 | 3 | 0 | 31 |
| Monarchs | 0 | 10 | 14 | 10 | 34 |

at Foreman Field • Norfolk, VA

- Date: November 10
- Game time: 2:30 p.m.
- Game attendance: 18,062
- TV: ESPN3

Game information

First Quarter

Second Quarter

Third Quarter

Fourth Quarter

Top Passers

- UNT –
- ODU –

Top Rushers

- UNT –
- ODU –

Top Receiving

- UNT –
- ODU –

=== Florida Atlantic ===
Florida Atlantic Owls at North Texas Mean Green

| Quarter | 1 | 2 | 3 | 4 | Total |
|---|---|---|---|---|---|
| Owls | 7 | 14 | 10 | 7 | 38 |
| Mean Green | 17 | 3 | 14 | 7 | 41 |

at Apogee Stadium • Denton, TX

- Date: November 15
- Game time: 8:30 p.m.
- Game attendance: 18,338
- TV: CBSSN

Game information

First Quarter

Second Quarter

Third Quarter

Fourth Quarter

Top Passers

- FAU –
- UNT –

Top Rushers

- FAU –
- UNT –

Top Receiving

- FAU –
- UNT –

=== At UTSA ===
North Texas Mean Green at UTSA Roadrunners

| Quarter | 1 | 2 | 3 | 4 | Total |
|---|---|---|---|---|---|
| Mean Green | 10 | 7 | 7 | 0 | 24 |
| Roadrunners | 0 | 14 | 0 | 7 | 21 |

at Alamodome • San Antonio, TX

- Date: November 24
- Game time: 6:00 p.m.
- Game attendance: 19,874
- TV: ESPN+

Game information

First Quarter

Second Quarter

Third Quarter

Fourth Quarter

Top Passers

- UNT –
- UTSA –

Top Rushers

- UNT –
- UTSA –

Top Receiving

- UNT –
- UTSA –

=== Vs. Utah State—New Mexico Bowl ===
North Texas Mean Green vs. Utah State Aggies

| Quarter | 1 | 2 | 3 | 4 | Total |
|---|---|---|---|---|---|
| Aggies | 14 | 24 | 7 | 7 | 52 |
| Mean Green | 7 | 0 | 6 | 0 | 13 |

at Dreamstyle Stadium • Albuquerque, NM

- Date: December 15
- Game time: 1:00 p.m.
- Game attendance: 25,387
- Referee: Kyle Olson
- TV announcers (ESPN): Mark Neely, John Congemi and Quint Kessenich

Game information

First Quarter

- UTST - Aaren Vaughns 72-yard TD pass from Jordan Love, Dominik Eberle kick good, 14:20 (UTST 7-0)
- UNT - DeAndre Torrey 2-yard TD run, Cole Hedlund kick good, 2:52 (TIE 7-7)
- UTST - Gerold Bright 26-yard TD run, Eberle kick good, 1:59 (UTST 14-7)

Second Quarter

- UTST - Love 9-yard TD run, Eberle kick good, 12:08 (UTST 21-7)
- UTST - Vaughns 37-yard TD pass from Love, Eberle kick good, 9:43 (UTST 28-7)
- UTST - Jalen Greene 67-yard TD pass from Love, Eberle kick good, 8:55 (UTST 35-7)
- UTST - Eberle 42-yard field goal, 0:00 (UTST 38-7)

Third Quarter

- UNT - Jalen Guyton 75-yard TD pass from Kason Martin, Hedlund kick blocked, 14:50 (UTST 38-13)
- UTST - Bright 3-yard TD run, Eberle kick good, 5:01 (UTST 45-13)

Fourth Quarter

- UTST - Ron'quavion Tarver 13-yard TD pass from Love, Eberle kick good, 8:30 (UTST 52-13)

Top Passers

- UNT – Kason Martin - 7/12, 110 yards, TD
- UTST – Jordan Love - 21/43, 359 yards, 4 TD, INT

Top Rushers

- UNT – Antony Wyche - 7 carries, 53 yards
- UTST – Gerold Bright - 16 carries, 103 yards, 2 TD

Top Receiving

- UNT – Jalen Guyton - 4 receptions, 103 yards, TD
- UTST – Jalen Greene - 6 receptions, 151 yards, TD

== Statistics ==
=== Scoring ===
Scores against non-conference opponents

| | 1 | 2 | 3 | 4 | Total |
|---|---|---|---|---|---|
| Opponents | 6 | 17 | 10 | 30 | 63 |
| Mean Green | 55 | 61 | 39 | 40 | 195 |

Scores against C-USA

| | 1 | 2 | 3 | 4 | Total |
|---|---|---|---|---|---|
| Opponents | 9 | 34 | 3 | 14 | 60 |
| Mean Green | 28 | 13 | 22 | 21 | 84 |

Scores against all opponents

| | 1 | 2 | 3 | 4 | Total |
|---|---|---|---|---|---|
| Opponents | 15 | 51 | 13 | 44 | 123 |
| Mean Green | 83 | 74 | 61 | 61 | 279 |
