= 2015 Famous Idaho Potato Bowl =

- 19th Famous Idaho Potato Bowl
Akron Zips	Utah State Aggies
(7–5)	(6–6)
MAC	Mountain West
23	21
Head coach: Terry Bowden	Head coach: Matt Wells
	1	2	3	4	Total
Akron	7	6	7	3	23
Utah State	0	7	7	7	21
- Date: December 22, 2015
- Season: 2015
- Stadium: Albertsons Stadium
- Location: Boise, Idaho
- MVP: Akron K Robert Stein
- Favorite: Utah State by 6
- Referee: Charles Lewis (Sun Belt)
- Attendance: 18,876
- Payout: US$325,000

United States TV coverage
- Network: ESPN/ESPN Radio
- Announcers: Mark Neely, Mike Bellotti, & Kevin Weidl (ESPN); Paul Loeffler, Pat Hill, & Marty Cesario (ESPN Radio)

The 2015 Famous Idaho Potato Bowl was a college football bowl game that was played on December 22, 2015 at Albertsons Stadium on the campus of Boise State University in Boise, Idaho. It was one of the 2015–16 bowl games that concluded the 2015 FBS football season. The nineteenth annual Famous Idaho Potato Bowl pitted the Akron Zips of the Mid-American Conference against the Utah State Aggies of the Mountain West Conference. The game started at 1:30 p.m. MST and aired on ESPN. The game is sponsored by the Idaho Potato Commission.

It is most notable for being the first bowl game victory in school history for Akron.

== Teams ==
The game featured the Akron Zips against the Utah State Aggies. It was the first overall meeting between the two schools.

=== Akron Zips ===
After finishing their regular season 7–5, the Zips accepted their invitation to the game.

This was the fourth bowl game in school history for Akron, and their first since the 2005 Motor City Bowl, where they lost to Memphis 38–31. Previous bowl games are: Grantland Rice Bowl 1968, and the Pioneer Bowl 1976.

=== Utah State Aggies ===
After finishing their regular season 6–6, the Aggies accepted their invitation to the game.

This was the Aggies' fourth Famous Idaho Potato Bowl; they had previously lost the 1997 Humanitarian Bowl (said game's inaugural edition) to Cincinnati 35–19, then lost the 2011 Famous Idaho Potato Bowl to Ohio 24–23, and finally won the 2012 Famous Idaho Potato Bowl over Toledo, 41–15.

== Game summary ==
=== Scoring summary ===
Scoring summary

Quarter	Time	Drive			Team	Scoring information	Score	
Quarter	Time	Plays	Yards	TOP	Team	Scoring information	Akron	USU
1	10:38	3	56	0:52	Akron	Thomas Woodson 14-yard touchdown reception from Tyrell Goodman, Robert Stein kick good	7	0
2	2:53	12	59	5:34	Akron	33-yard field goal by Robert Stein	10	0
2	1:32	3	71	1:21	USU	Brandon Swindall 9-yard touchdown reception from Kent Myers, Brock Warren kick good	10	7
2	0:00	1	0	0:04	Akron	29-yard field goal by Robert Stein	13	7
3	12:41	7	64	2:19	USU	Hunter Sharp 19-yard touchdown reception from Kent Myers, Brock Warren kick good	13	14
3	5:43	8	40	4:00	Akron	Donnell Alexander 2-yard touchdown run, Robert Stein kick good	20	14
4	8:15	10	64	1:30	Akron	46-yard field goal by Robert Stein	23	14
4	1:12	10	64	1:30	USU	Brandon Swindall 2-yard touchdown reception from Chuckie Keeton, Brock Warren kick good	23	21
"TOP" = time of possession. For other American football terms, see Glossary of American football.							23	21

=== Statistics ===
Statistics	Akron	USU
First downs	17	22
Plays–yards	72–282	74–363
Rushes–yards	42–100	29–131
Passing yards	182	232
Passing: Comp–Att–Int	15–30–1	28–45–1
Time of possession	34:07	25:53
