= 2014 New Mexico Bowl =

American college football game

2014 Gildan New Mexico Bowl
- 9th New Mexico Bowl
Utah State Aggies	UTEP Miners
(9–4)	(7–5)
Mountain West	C-USA
21	6
Head coach: Matt Wells	Head coach: Sean Kugler
	1	2	3	4	Total
Utah State	7	0	7	7	21
UTEP	3	0	0	3	6
- Date: December 20, 2014
- Season: 2014
- Stadium: University Stadium
- Location: Albuquerque, New Mexico
- MVP: Offense: Utah State QB Kent Myers; Defense: Utah State LB Zach Vigil
- Favorite: Utah State by 10
- Referee: Charles Lewis (Sun Belt)
- Attendance: 28,725
- Payout: US$456,250

United States TV coverage
- Network: ESPN/ESPN Radio
- Announcers: Mark Neely, David Diaz-Infante, & Kayce Smith (ESPN); Drew Goodman, Tom Ramsey, & Dave Shore (ESPN Radio)

The 2014 New Mexico Bowl was a college football bowl game that was played on December 20, 2014, at University Stadium in Albuquerque, New Mexico. The ninth annual New Mexico Bowl, it pitted the Utah State Aggies of the Mountain West Conference against the UTEP Miners of Conference USA. It was one of the 2014–15 bowl games that concluded the 2014 FBS football season. The game started at 12:20 p.m. MST and aired on ESPN. Sponsored by clothing company Gildan Activewear, the game was officially known as the Gildan New Mexico Bowl. Utah State beat UTEP by a score of 21–6.

== Team selection ==
The game featured the Utah State Aggies of the Mountain West Conference against the UTEP Miners of Conference USA.

This was the third meeting between these two teams, with Utah State previously leading the series 2–0. The last time these two teams had met was in 1961.

=== Utah State Aggies ===
This was Utah State's first New Mexico Bowl.

=== UTEP Miners ===
This was UTEP's second New Mexico Bowl; the Miners had previously played in the 2010 game, where they lost to the BYU Cougars by a score of 52–24. It was also the Miners' first bowl appearance since that game, where they once again attempted to get their first bowl victory since the 1967 Sun Bowl.

== Game summary ==
=== Scoring summary ===
Scoring summary

Quarter	Time	Drive			Team	Scoring information	Score	
Quarter	Time	Plays	Yards	TOP	Team	Scoring information	USU	UTEP
1	3:10	7	60	3:50	UTEP	32-yard field goal by Jay Mattox	0	3
1	1:52	3	75	1:18	USU	Kent Myers 48-yard touchdown run, Nick Diaz kick good	7	3
3	12:12	7	75	2:28	USU	Nick Vigil 3-yard touchdown run, Nick Diaz kick good	14	3
4	3:02	16	54	6:56	UTEP	34-yard field goal by Jay Mattox	14	6
4	1:33	4	65	1:29	USU	Joe Hill 11-yard touchdown run, Nick Diaz kick good	21	6
"TOP" = time of possession. For other American football terms, see Glossary of American football.							21	6

=== Statistics ===
Statistics	USU	UTEP
First downs	16	12
Plays–yards	52–347	70–275
Rushes–yards	40–279	46–149
Passing yards	68	126
Passing: Comp–Att–Int	5–12–1	13–24–1
Time of possession	23:26	36:34
