= Durkin =

Durkin, together with Durcan and Durkan, is the anglicised form of the Irish surnames Ó Duarcáin or Mac Duarcáin. Notable people who spell the surname Durkin include:

- Barbara Durkin, English actress
- Brian F. Durkin (born 1976), American actor
- D. J. Durkin (born 1978), American football coach
- Herbert Durkin, British military officer
- Jim Durkin (born 1961), American politician
- John A. Durkin (1936–2012), U.S. senator
- John Durkin (footballer) (1930–1983), Scottish association football player
- Junior Durkin (1915–1935), American actor
- Kathy Durkin, Irish singer
- Martin Patrick Durkin (1894–1955), American politician
- Martin Durkin (director), British television producer
- Martin James Durkin (1901–1981), American criminal
- Paul Durkin (born 1955), English football referee
- Philip Durkin, lexicographer and etymologist
- Philip J. Durkin (1903–1992), American jurist and politician
- Raymond M. Durkin (1936–2014), American politician
- Shane Durkin (born 1987), Irish hurler
- Tom Durkin (sportscaster) (born 1950), American sportscaster
- Tom Durkin (artist) (1853–1902), Australian cartoonist
- Tom Durkin (soccer coach), American soccer manager
- Thomas Durkin (rugby league) (1895–1958), British rugby league footballer
- Thomas Anthony Durkin, American lawyer
- Thomas M. Durkin, US District Judge for the Northern District of Illinois
- William Durkin (basketball) (1922–2012), American professional basketball player
- William Durkin (footballer) (1921–2000), English professional footballer
- William L. Durkin (1916–2006), American soldier

== See also ==
- Durkin Opening
- Molly Durkin, song
- Muirsheen Durkin, song
- Dorkin, variation of the surname Durkin
