= Dworkin (surname) =

Dworkin or Dvorkin (Russian: Дворкин) is a Jewish (Eastern Ashkenazic) surname originating from the diminutive Dvorke/Dvorka of the Yiddish form Dvoyre/Dviyra of the Hebrew given name Deborah. In Slavic countries it is strictly masculine, with the feminine counterpart being Dworkina or Dvorkina. Notable people with the surname include:

- Aaron Dworkin (born 1970), American musician and activist
- Alexander Dvorkin, a sectologist, linked to Russian Orthodox Church
- Andrea Dworkin (1946–2005), American feminist writer
- Barbara Lee Dworkin (born 1932), American preservationist and author
- Cora Dvorkin, Argentine physicist
- Craig Dworkin, American poet and Professor of English
- Dan Dworkin (born 1972), American screenwriter and television producer
- David Dworkin (born 1934), American musician
- Dorothy Dworkin (1889–1976), Canadian nurse, businesswoman and philanthropist
- Gerald Dworkin (born 1937), American legal philosopher
- Howard Dvorkin, American finance expert
- Jeffrey Dvorkin, American journalist
- Judith Dvorkin (1928–1995), American composer and librettist
- Ilya Dvorkin, Russian-Israeli historian
- Keith Dworkin, American playwright
- Mark J. Dworkin (1946–2012), Canadian writer
- Polina Dvorkina (born 2002), perpetrator of the 2022 Krasnoyarsk kindergarten shooting
- Ronald Dworkin (1931–2013), American legal philosopher
- Ronald W. Dworkin, American anesthesiologist
- Vladimir Dvorkin (born 1936), Russian commanding officer, ballistic missiles designer, and statesman

== See also ==
- Dorkin
- Dwoskin
- Dvořák (name), including Dworzak, Dworak
