= Dork =

Dork may refer to:

- A pejorative describing a socially inept or awkward person

== People ==
- Dork Sahagian, Armenian-American climate scientist

== Arts, entertainment, and media ==
- Dork (EP), an album by AFI
- Dork (magazine), a UK music monthly
- Dork, a common unofficial name for the higher-definition posable man CGI character introduced in the CGI program Poser 3 and Poser 4
- Dork, the card game also known as President and other names
- Dork trilogy, a series of novels by Sidin Vadukut
- Dork, a comic book by Evan Dorkin published from 1993 to 2006

== See also ==
- Dorking (disambiguation)
- Dorkly, American web series
