= 2018 NCAA Division I FBS football season =

American college football season

2018 NCAA Division I FBS season
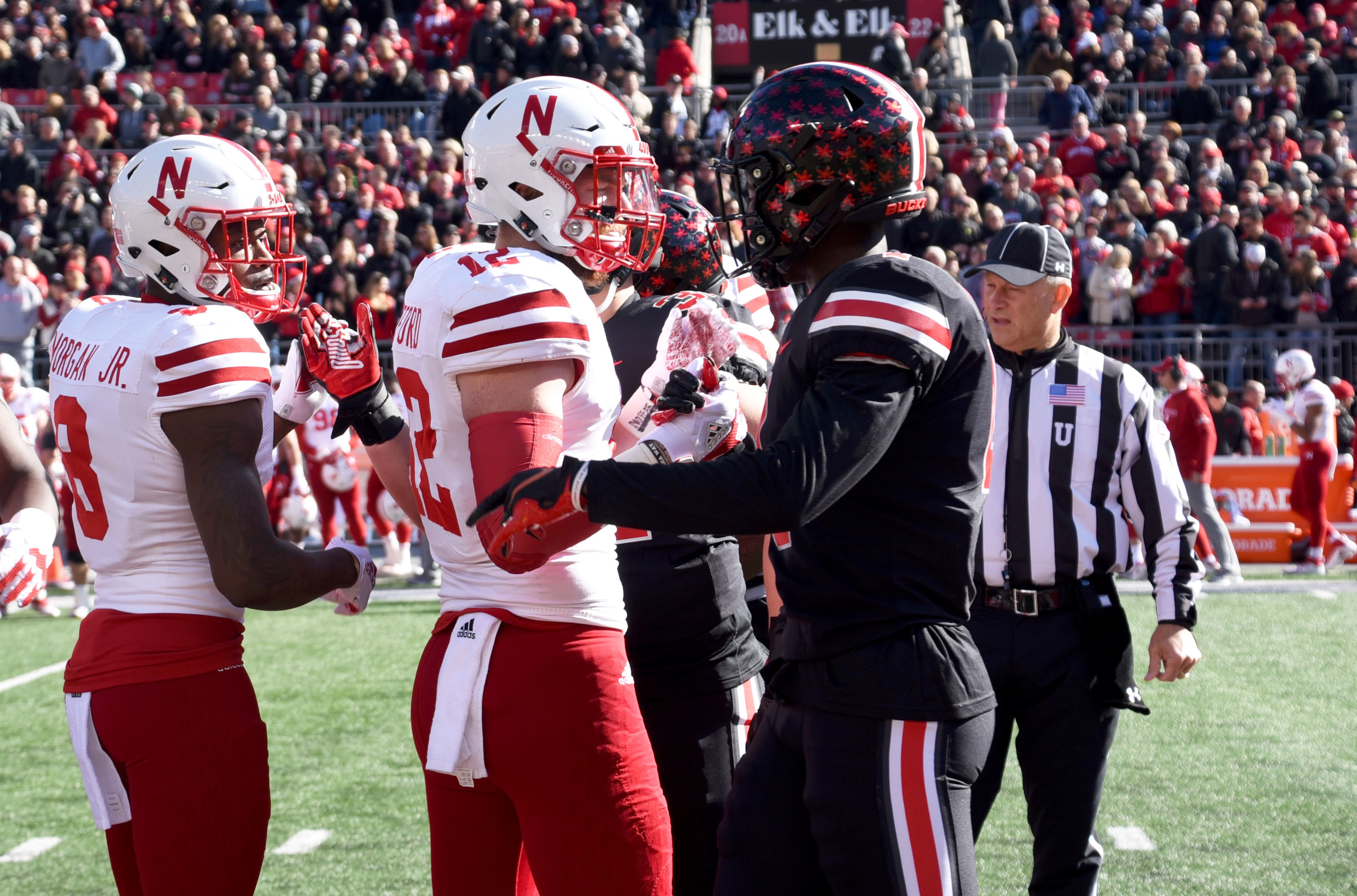
- An Ohio State and Nebraska football player shake hands after the coin toss at the Ohio State football game on November 3, 2018, in Columbus, Ohio.
- Number of teams: 129 + 1 transitional
- Duration: August 25, 2018 – December 8, 2018
- Preseason AP No. 1: Alabama

Postseason
- Duration: December 15, 2018 – January 7, 2019
- Bowl games: 40
- AP Poll No. 1: Clemson
- Coaches Poll No. 1: Clemson
- Heisman Trophy: Kyler Murray, QB, Oklahoma

College Football Playoff
- 2019 College Football Playoff National Championship
- Site: Levi's Stadium; Santa Clara, California
- Champion(s): Clemson

NCAA Division I FBS football seasons
- ← 2017 2019 →

The 2018 NCAA Division I FBS football season was the 149th season of college football in the United States organized by the National Collegiate Athletic Association (NCAA) at its highest level of competition, the Football Bowl Subdivision (FBS). The regular season began on August 25, 2018, and ended on December 8, 2018. The postseason began on December 15, and aside from any all-star games that were scheduled, concluded on January 7, 2019, with the 2019 College Football Playoff National Championship at Levi's Stadium in Santa Clara, California. The Clemson Tigers won the title game over the Alabama Crimson Tide, the school's third national title and second in three years, and also becoming the first team since the 1897 Penn Quakers to have a perfect 15-0 season.

== Rule changes ==
=== Game rules ===
The following rule changes were approved by the NCAA Playing Rules Oversight Panel for the 2018 season:

- Allow players to fair catch the ball inside the 25 yard line on a kickoff and be awarded a touchback, placing the ball at the 25 yard line.
- Offensive players cannot block below the waist more than five yards past the line of scrimmage and, with the exception of interior linemen, all blocks below the waist must be from the front.
- The play clock will be set to 40 seconds between a touchdown and the PAT or two-point conversion and after a kickoff.
- Mirroring the NFL rule adopted in the 2010 season, a 10-second runoff will be applied within the final minute of each half if a replay review overturns the call on the field, and the correct ruling would not have stopped the game clock. As with any other 10 second runoff, teams can take a time out (if available) to avoid the runoff.
- Extending the "no leaping" rule on PATs and field goals adopted in the 2017 season to include the "shield" on a punt.
- Allowing penalties incurred on successful field goals to be enforced on the ensuing kickoff, which matches the rule for successful extra point attempts.
- Continuing the experiment of a collaborative instant replay decision making model not confined to the press box.

=== Eligibility rules ===
Major changes to redshirt rules in Division I football (both FBS and FCS) took effect from this season forward after having been approved by the NCAA Division I Council on June 13, 2018. Players can now participate in as many as four games in a season while still retaining redshirt status. This new rule does not apply to players who enroll at a school midyear and participate in postseason competition taking place during or before their first academic term at that school.

== Conference realignment ==
=== Membership changes ===
| School | Former conference | New conference |
|---|---|---|
| Idaho Vandals | Sun Belt | Big Sky (FCS) |
| New Mexico State Aggies | Sun Belt | FBS independent |
| Liberty Flames | Big South (FCS) | FBS independent |

New Mexico State left the Sun Belt Conference following the 2017 season and will compete as an FBS independent. Idaho also left the Sun Belt, dropping its football program from the FBS to FCS level, where it will compete in the Big Sky Conference.

Liberty began a two-year transition from FCS in 2017. The Flames will be counted as an FBS independent for scheduling purposes in 2018, but will not be fully bowl-eligible until the 2019 season. However, they may participate in a bowl in 2018 if they have at least six eligible wins and there are not enough bowl-eligible teams to fill all the spots.

== Other headlines ==
- July 13 – Following reports that Papa John's Pizza founder John Schnatter had said the "n-word" in an internal conference call, which led to his resignation both as company chairman and member of the University of Louisville board of trustees, university president Neeli Bendapudi announced that the company's name would be removed from the Cardinal Stadium name effective immediately.
- August 1 – Ohio State administrators placed head coach Urban Meyer on paid administrative leave while the school announced it was launching an investigation into claims that Meyer knew of former assistant coach Zach Smith's involvement in a 2015 domestic violence incident against his ex-wife Courtney Smith. Zach Smith had been fired on July 23 after the allegations were made public.
  - August 22 – Following the investigation, Ohio State announced that Meyer would be suspended for the first three games of the 2018 season. In addition, athletic director Gene Smith was suspended from August 31 to September 16.
- August 11 – Maryland placed head coach D. J. Durkin on paid administrative leave during the school's investigation into the death of player Jordan McNair from heatstroke following an offseason practice, in addition to allegations of abuse and disparagement by coaches within the program. This announcement came the day after the school had placed two trainers and the team's strength coach on administrative leave.
  - August 14 – Maryland president Wallace Loh announced that the school "accepts legal and moral responsibility for the mistakes" that led to McNair's death. The university also parted ways with Rick Court, the strength coach widely blamed for establishing the alleged culture of abuse revealed in recent news reports. Court had resigned the previous day, and reached a financial settlement with the university shortly before Loh made his announcement.
  - October 31 – A day after Durkin was reinstated as head coach after the completion of the school's probe, resulting in widespread outrage among state politicians, students, faculty, and members of McNair's family, Loh fired Durkin. Matt Canada, who had been named the interim head coach following Durkin's original suspension, continued in that role for the remainder of the season.
- September 8 – Two of the longest futility streaks of their types in FBS history ended:
  - First, in an afternoon game in Mount Pleasant, Michigan, Kansas defeated Central Michigan 31–7, ending the longest road losing streak in FBS history at 46 games. The only longer such streak in college football history was the 48-game streak of FCS Idaho State, which ended in 2014.
  - In a night game, Kentucky defeated Florida 27–16 for the Wildcats' first win over the Gators since 1986 and ending the longest current losing streak in an uninterrupted series at 31 games. This streak was the fourth-longest of its type in NCAA history. This also marked Kentucky's first win in Gainesville since 1979.
- October 28 – Following a weekend in which eight teams ranked in the AP Poll lost to unranked teams—the most since that poll expanded to a Top 25 format in 1989—seven new teams entered the poll for Week 10, the most in the Top 25 era.
- November 24
  - The LSU–Texas A&M game, played at Kyle Field in College Station, Texas, went to seven overtimes and lasted nearly five hours, tying the NCAA record for longest football game with four others. The Aggies slipped past the Tigers 74–72. At the time, the 146 combined points were the second most in college football history since the NCAA started keeping records in 1937, behind the 161 points scored in a 2008 NCAA Division II game between Abilene Christian and West Texas A&M of the Lone Star Conference.
  - In addition, two notable postseason results were for all intents and purposes confirmed:
    - Florida State's loss to rival Florida 41–14 ended the program's Division I FBS-leading streak of 36 consecutive appearances in a postseason bowl game, as the team finished 5–7, and failed to reach bowl eligibility.
    - Notre Dame's win over rival USC 24-17 resulted in the Fighting Irish completing their first undefeated regular season since 2012. This, combined with their lack of a conference title game, resulted in many sports media declaring that Notre Dame was guaranteed to qualify for the College Football Playoff.
- December 15 – Georgia Southern completed its season in the Camellia Bowl with a new FBS record for fewest turnovers lost in a season, with five. The previous record of eight had been accomplished by six teams, most recently by LSU in 2017.
- December 20 – In a more ignominious milestone, South Florida ended its season in the Gasparilla Bowl with a 38–20 loss to Marshall, becoming the first FBS team ever to finish a season 7–6 after a 7–0 start.
- December 22 – Army tied two records for all Division I bowl games in its 70–14 blowout of Houston in the Armed Forces Bowl. The 70 points equaled West Virginia's output against Clemson in the 2012 Orange Bowl (70–33), and the victory margin equaled that of Tulsa against Bowling Green in the 2008 GMAC Bowl (63–7). It was also the first time since 1955 that the Black Knights had scored 70 points in a game, and capped off the team's first-ever 11-win season.
- December 27 – In its 63–14 blowout of Purdue in the Music City Bowl, Auburn led 56–7 at halftime, setting a new record for points scored by a single team in any half of a bowl game. The previous record had been held by West Virginia, which scored 49 points in the first half of the 2012 Orange Bowl.

== Updated stadiums ==
- Arizona State completed its four-phase renovation of Sun Devil Stadium. The fourth and final phase includes reconstruction of the east sideline. The capacity is now 55,000, down from 71,706 just prior to the renovation.
- Arkansas debuted its $160 million expansion of the north end zone of Donald W. Reynolds Razorback Stadium. The expansion added 4,800 seats and new premium seating to the north end zone, boosting the capacity of the stadium to 80,800.
- Georgia debuted its $63 million new west end zone project at Sanford Stadium, which relocates the locker room from the east side to the west side, as well as the addition of a new plaza and recruiting pavilion. The project increased the stadium's capacity by 500 seats.
- Indiana debuted its $50 million south end zone complex at Memorial Stadium. The project includes a new rehabilitation and treatment facility for athletes, additional academic and life skills support facilities, a multi-use outdoor terrace on the roof of the structure, and an entry plaza and green space at the south end of the stadium. A new 42 x 91.3 ft. video board was installed for the 2018 season in the completed south end zone.
- Iowa is currently rebuilding the north end zone of Kinnick Stadium. The $89.9 million upgrade will feature the addition of box seating, outdoor club seating and a new scoreboard. Some seating opened for the 2018 season, while the entire project is scheduled to be complete in 2019.
- Liberty completed an expansion of Williams Stadium during the 2018 season. The capacity was increased from 19,200 to 25,000 in time for the Flames' FBS debut, while construction on a new press box continued until midseason.
- Louisville debuted an expansion of the venue then known as Cardinal Stadium, specifically the filling in of the north end zone. Two new video scoreboards were also installed. While Louisville had long publicized this expansion project as adding 10,000 seats, bringing the capacity to 65,000, it acknowledged in February 2018 that the final capacity would instead be about 61,000.

=== Renamed stadiums ===
Colorado State announced on April 19, 2018, that an area financial institution, Public Service Credit Union, had paid $37.7 million over 15 years to place its name on the venue then known as Colorado State Stadium. The new stadium name was not revealed at that time because PSCU was in the process of changing its name, with the new name expected to be announced in June 2018. The deal did not affect the playing surface, which continues to be named after former Rams head coach Sonny Lubick. On June 5, the former PSCU announced its new name of Canvas Credit Union, with the CSU venue becoming Canvas Stadium.

Kansas renamed their stadium to David Booth Kansas Memorial Stadium in honor of alumnus David Booth who donated $50 million to the school for renovations to the stadium.

As noted above, Louisville removed the Papa John's name from Cardinal Stadium in the wake of the controversy over founder John Schnatter.

== Kickoff games ==
=== "Week Zero" ===
The regular season began with four Week 0 games on Saturday, August 25:

- UMass defeated Duquesne, 63–15
- Rice defeated Prairie View A&M, 31–28
- Hawaii defeated Colorado State, 43–34, in the only in-conference matchup of the week
- Wyoming defeated New Mexico State, 29–7

=== Week 1 ===
The vast majority of FBS teams opened the season on Labor Day weekend. Five neutral-site "kickoff" games were held (rankings reflect the Week 1 AP Poll):

- Texas Kickoff (NRG Stadium, Houston): Ole Miss defeated Texas Tech, 47–27
- Chick-fil-A Kickoff Game (Mercedes-Benz Stadium, Atlanta): No. 9 Auburn defeated No. 6 Washington, 21–16
- Belk Kickoff Game (Bank of America Stadium, Charlotte): No. 17 West Virginia defeated Tennessee, 40–14
- Camping World Kickoff (Camping World Stadium, Orlando): No. 1 Alabama defeated Louisville, 51–14
- Advocare Classic (AT&T Stadium, Arlington): No. 25 LSU defeated No. 8 Miami, 33–17

== Regular season top 10 matchups ==
Rankings reflect the AP Poll. Rankings for Week 10 and beyond will list College Football Playoff Rankings first and AP Poll second. Teams that fail to be a top 10 team for one poll or the other will be noted.

- Week 1
  - No. 9 Auburn defeated No. 6 Washington, 21–16 (Mercedes-Benz Stadium, Atlanta, GA)
- Week 5
  - No. 4 Ohio State defeated No. 9 Penn State, 27–26 (Beaver Stadium, University Park, PA)
  - No. 8 Notre Dame defeated No. 7 Stanford, 38–17 (Notre Dame Stadium, South Bend, IN)
- Week 9
  - No. 7 Georgia defeated No. 9 Florida, 36–17 (TIAA Bank Field, Jacksonville, FL)
- Week 10
  - No. 1/1 Alabama defeated No. 3/4 LSU, 29–0 (Tiger Stadium, Baton Rouge, LA)
  - No. 6/6 Georgia defeated No. 9/11 Kentucky, 34–17 (Kroger Field, Lexington, KY)
- Week 13
  - No. 10/10 Ohio State defeated No. 4/4 Michigan, 62–39 (Ohio Stadium, Columbus, OH)
- Week 14
  - No. 1/1 Alabama defeated No. 4/4 Georgia, 35–28 (2018 SEC Championship Game, Mercedes-Benz Stadium, Atlanta, GA)
  - No. 5/5 Oklahoma defeated No. 14/9 Texas, 39–27 (2018 Big 12 Championship Game, AT&T Stadium, Arlington, TX)

== Canceled and rescheduled games ==
=== Week 1 ===
Two games were canceled due to thunderstorms:

- South Dakota State at Iowa State
- Akron at Nebraska

Three of these four teams later found replacement games to fill out their schedule.

=== Week 3 ===
Five games were canceled due to Hurricane Florence:

- No. 14 West Virginia at NC State
- No. 18 UCF at North Carolina
- East Carolina at No. 13 Virginia Tech
- Marshall at South Carolina
- Southern Miss at Appalachian State

Five of the ten teams that lost games due to Florence scheduled tentative replacement games for Week 14, which is normally reserved for conference championship games.

Four games were moved forward in anticipation of Florence:

- Old Dominion at Charlotte moved to 4:00 p.m. ET on Thursday, September 13
- Boston College at Wake Forest moved to 5:30 p.m. ET on Thursday, September 13
- Middle Tennessee at No. 3 Georgia moved to 12:00 p.m. ET on Saturday, September 15
- Georgia Southern at No. 2 Clemson moved to 12:00 p.m. ET on Saturday, September 15

One game was moved forward and to the visiting team's stadium in anticipation of Florence:

- Campbell at Coastal Carolina was moved from CCU's Brooks Stadium to Campbell's Barker-Lane Stadium, and the kickoff was moved to 2:00 p.m. ET on Wednesday, September 12

One game was moved to a neutral site in anticipation of Florence:

- Ohio vs Virginia was moved to Vanderbilt Stadium in Nashville, Tennessee

One game was rescheduled in anticipation of Florence:

- Norfolk State at Liberty moved to Saturday, December 1

=== Week 9 ===
- Bethune-Cookman vs. Nebraska at Memorial Stadium. Scheduled after Nebraska canceled their Week 1 game vs. Akron due to inclement weather.

=== Week 12 ===
- The Big Game between Cal and Stanford, originally scheduled for Saturday, November 17, was postponed to Saturday, December 1 due to the Camp Fire in Northern California.

=== Week 14 ===
Normally reserved for conference championship games, several games were added to the schedule to replace earlier, canceled games. All of these games were contingent upon both teams being available.

- After both teams canceled games due to Hurricane Florence, NC State and ECU agreed to schedule a new game against each other on December 1 at 12:00 EST at Carter Finley Stadium, and will officially serve as a home game for NC State. The meeting was contingent on neither team qualifying for its respective conference championship game, both of which were scheduled for that same weekend, but was confirmed once both teams were eliminated from contention for their title games. Events were held at the game to raise money to support victims of Hurricane Florence.
- Iowa State announced on October 1 that it had scheduled a game against FCS opponent Incarnate Word as a replacement for their canceled Week 1 game. The game was contingent upon both teams being available for the December 1 match-up at Jack Trice Stadium. On November 19, Incarnate Word accepted a bid to the FCS playoffs, if Incarnate Word were to win that game, Iowa State would be left without an opponent, again. Therefore, on November 20, Iowa State announced that they had canceled the game with Incarnate Word and scheduled a game with Drake for the same date and location.
- South Carolina scheduled a game against Akron on December 1 at Williams-Brice Stadium to replace games each team lost due to weather events. The game was scheduled as a twelfth game on November 2, 2018, as soon as it was clear that neither team was going to qualify for their conference championship, freeing them up for week 14.
- On November 18, 2018, it was announced that Virginia Tech and Marshall scheduled a game for December 1 at Lane Stadium to make up for games lost due to Hurricane Florence. The game was contingent upon one or both teams needing the win to earn bowl eligibility. As of the announcement, Marshall was already bowl eligible, but Virginia Tech needed two more wins in their final two games (including the tentative Marshall game) to become bowl-eligible. The game was confirmed once Tech defeated Virginia during Week 13.

=== Postseason ===
The 2018 First Responder Bowl on December 26 between Boston College and Boise State was canceled after severe weather hit the Dallas area. The game was stopped due to lightning in the area shortly after BC had taken a 7–0 lead in the first quarter, and was canceled about 90 minutes later. Lightning continued in the vicinity of the stadium for an additional 90 minutes, and further severe weather was expected for later that night. According to an NCAA spokesperson, this was believed to be the first bowl game ever called off due to weather conditions.

== Conference standings ==
2018 American Athletic Conference football standings
| | Conf. | | | Overall |
| Team | W | | L | W | | L |
|---|---|---|---|---|---|---|
East Division
| No. 11 UCF x$ | 8 | – | 0 | 12 | – | 1 |
| Temple | 7 | – | 1 | 8 | – | 5 |
| No. 24 Cincinnati | 6 | – | 2 | 11 | – | 2 |
| South Florida | 3 | – | 5 | 7 | – | 6 |
| East Carolina | 1 | – | 7 | 3 | – | 9 |
| UConn | 0 | – | 8 | 1 | – | 11 |
West Division
| Memphis xy | 5 | – | 3 | 8 | – | 6 |
| Houston x | 5 | – | 3 | 8 | – | 5 |
| Tulane x | 5 | – | 3 | 7 | – | 6 |
| SMU | 4 | – | 4 | 5 | – | 7 |
| Navy | 2 | – | 6 | 3 | – | 10 |
| Tulsa | 2 | – | 6 | 3 | – | 9 |
Championship: UCF 56, Memphis 41
$ – Conference champion; x – Division champion/co-champions; y – Championship game participant; Rankings from AP Poll

2018 Atlantic Coast Conference football standings
| | Conf. | | | Overall |
| Team | W | | L | W | | L |
|---|---|---|---|---|---|---|
Atlantic Division
| No. 1 Clemson x$#^ | 8 | – | 0 | 15 | – | 0 |
| No. 15 Syracuse | 6 | – | 2 | 10 | – | 3 |
| NC State | 5 | – | 3 | 9 | – | 4 |
| Boston College | 4 | – | 4 | 7 | – | 5 |
| Wake Forest | 3 | – | 5 | 7 | – | 6 |
| Florida State | 3 | – | 5 | 5 | – | 7 |
| Louisville | 0 | – | 8 | 2 | – | 10 |
Coastal Division
| Pittsburgh x | 6 | – | 2 | 7 | – | 7 |
| Georgia Tech | 5 | – | 3 | 7 | – | 6 |
| Miami (FL) | 4 | – | 4 | 7 | – | 6 |
| Virginia | 4 | – | 4 | 8 | – | 5 |
| Virginia Tech | 4 | – | 4 | 6 | – | 7 |
| Duke | 3 | – | 5 | 8 | – | 5 |
| North Carolina | 1 | – | 7 | 2 | – | 9 |
Championship: Clemson 42, Pittsburgh 10
# – College Football Playoff champion; ^ – College Football Playoff participant; $ – Conference champion; x – Division champion/co-champions; Rankings from AP Poll

2018 Big Ten Conference football standings
| | Conf. | | | Overall |
| Team | W | | L | W | | L |
|---|---|---|---|---|---|---|
East Division
| No. 3 Ohio State xy$ | 8 | – | 1 | 13 | – | 1 |
| No. 14 Michigan x | 8 | – | 1 | 10 | – | 3 |
| No. 17 Penn State | 6 | – | 3 | 9 | – | 4 |
| Michigan State | 5 | – | 4 | 7 | – | 6 |
| Maryland | 3 | – | 6 | 5 | – | 7 |
| Indiana | 2 | – | 7 | 5 | – | 7 |
| Rutgers | 0 | – | 9 | 1 | – | 11 |
West Division
| No. 21 Northwestern xy | 8 | – | 1 | 9 | – | 5 |
| Wisconsin | 5 | – | 4 | 8 | – | 5 |
| No. 25 Iowa | 5 | – | 4 | 9 | – | 4 |
| Purdue | 5 | – | 4 | 6 | – | 7 |
| Minnesota | 3 | – | 6 | 7 | – | 6 |
| Nebraska | 3 | – | 6 | 4 | – | 8 |
| Illinois | 2 | – | 7 | 4 | – | 8 |
Championship: Ohio State 45, Northwestern 24
$ – Conference champion; x – Division champion/co-champions; y – Championship game participant; Rankings from AP Poll

2018 Big 12 Conference football standings
| | Conf. | | | Overall |
| Team | W | | L | W | | L |
|---|---|---|---|---|---|---|
| No. 4 Oklahoma y$^ | 8 | – | 1 | 12 | – | 2 |
| No. 9 Texas y | 7 | – | 2 | 10 | – | 4 |
| Iowa State | 6 | – | 3 | 8 | – | 5 |
| No. 20 West Virginia | 6 | – | 3 | 8 | – | 4 |
| TCU | 4 | – | 5 | 7 | – | 6 |
| Baylor | 4 | – | 5 | 7 | – | 6 |
| Oklahoma State | 3 | – | 6 | 7 | – | 6 |
| Kansas State | 3 | – | 6 | 5 | – | 7 |
| Texas Tech | 3 | – | 6 | 5 | – | 7 |
| Kansas | 1 | – | 8 | 3 | – | 9 |
Championship: Oklahoma 39, Texas 27
^ – College Football Playoff participant; $ – Conference champion; y – Championship game participant; Rankings from AP Poll

2018 Conference USA football standings
| | Conf. | | | Overall |
| Team | W | | L | W | | L |
|---|---|---|---|---|---|---|
East Division
| Middle Tennessee x | 7 | – | 1 | 8 | – | 6 |
| FIU | 6 | – | 2 | 9 | – | 4 |
| Marshall | 6 | – | 2 | 9 | – | 4 |
| Charlotte | 4 | – | 4 | 5 | – | 7 |
| Florida Atlantic | 3 | – | 5 | 5 | – | 7 |
| Old Dominion | 2 | – | 6 | 4 | – | 8 |
| Western Kentucky | 2 | – | 6 | 3 | – | 9 |
West Division
| UAB x$ | 7 | – | 1 | 11 | – | 3 |
| North Texas | 5 | – | 3 | 9 | – | 4 |
| Louisiana Tech | 5 | – | 3 | 8 | – | 5 |
| Southern Miss | 5 | – | 3 | 6 | – | 5 |
| UTSA | 2 | – | 6 | 3 | – | 9 |
| UTEP | 1 | – | 7 | 1 | – | 11 |
| Rice | 1 | – | 7 | 2 | – | 11 |
Championship: UAB 27, Middle Tennessee 25
$ – Conference champion; x – Division champion/co-champions

2018 Mid-American Conference football standings
| | Conf. | | | Overall |
| Team | W | | L | W | | L |
|---|---|---|---|---|---|---|
East Division
| Buffalo x | 7 | – | 1 | 10 | – | 4 |
| Miami (OH) | 6 | – | 2 | 6 | – | 6 |
| Ohio | 6 | – | 2 | 9 | – | 4 |
| Akron | 2 | – | 6 | 4 | – | 8 |
| Bowling Green | 2 | – | 6 | 3 | – | 9 |
| Kent State | 1 | – | 7 | 2 | – | 10 |
West Division
| Northern Illinois x$ | 6 | – | 2 | 8 | – | 6 |
| Western Michigan | 5 | – | 3 | 7 | – | 6 |
| Eastern Michigan | 5 | – | 3 | 7 | – | 6 |
| Toledo | 5 | – | 3 | 7 | – | 6 |
| Ball State | 3 | – | 5 | 4 | – | 8 |
| Central Michigan | 0 | – | 8 | 1 | – | 11 |
Championship: Northern Illinois 30, Buffalo 29
$ – Conference champion; x – Division champion/co-champions

2018 Mountain West Conference football standings
| | Conf. | | | Overall |
| Team | W | | L | W | | L |
|---|---|---|---|---|---|---|
Mountain Division
| No. 23 Boise State x | 7 | – | 1 | 10 | – | 3 |
| No. 22 Utah State | 7 | – | 1 | 11 | – | 2 |
| Wyoming | 4 | – | 4 | 6 | – | 6 |
| Air Force | 3 | – | 5 | 5 | – | 7 |
| Colorado State | 2 | – | 6 | 3 | – | 9 |
| New Mexico | 1 | – | 7 | 3 | – | 9 |
West Division
| No. 18 Fresno State x$ | 7 | – | 1 | 12 | – | 2 |
| Nevada | 5 | – | 3 | 8 | – | 5 |
| Hawaii | 5 | – | 3 | 8 | – | 6 |
| San Diego State | 4 | – | 4 | 7 | – | 6 |
| UNLV | 2 | – | 6 | 4 | – | 8 |
| San Jose State | 1 | – | 7 | 1 | – | 11 |
Championship: Fresno State 19, Boise State 16 (OT)
$ – Conference champion; x – Division champion/co-champions; y – Championship game participant; Rankings from AP Poll

2018 Pac-12 Conference football standings
| | Conf. | | | Overall |
| Team | W | | L | W | | L |
|---|---|---|---|---|---|---|
North Division
| No. 13 Washington xy$ | 7 | – | 2 | 10 | – | 4 |
| No. 10 Washington State x | 7 | – | 2 | 11 | – | 2 |
| Stanford | 6 | – | 3 | 9 | – | 4 |
| Oregon | 5 | – | 4 | 9 | – | 4 |
| California | 4 | – | 5 | 7 | – | 6 |
| Oregon State | 1 | – | 8 | 2 | – | 10 |
South Division
| Utah xy | 6 | – | 3 | 9 | – | 5 |
| Arizona State | 5 | – | 4 | 7 | – | 6 |
| USC | 4 | – | 5 | 5 | – | 7 |
| Arizona | 4 | – | 5 | 5 | – | 7 |
| UCLA | 3 | – | 6 | 3 | – | 9 |
| Colorado | 2 | – | 7 | 5 | – | 7 |
Championship: Washington 10, Utah 3
$ – Conference champion; x – Division champion/co-champions; y – Championship game participant; Rankings from AP Poll

2018 Southeastern Conference football standings
| | Conf. | | | Overall |
| Team | W | | L | W | | L |
|---|---|---|---|---|---|---|
Eastern Division
| No. T–7 Georgia x | 7 | – | 1 | 11 | – | 3 |
| No. 12 Kentucky | 5 | – | 3 | 10 | – | 3 |
| No. T–7 Florida | 5 | – | 3 | 10 | – | 3 |
| South Carolina | 4 | – | 4 | 7 | – | 6 |
| Missouri | 4 | – | 4 | 8 | – | 5 |
| Vanderbilt | 3 | – | 5 | 6 | – | 7 |
| Tennessee | 2 | – | 6 | 5 | – | 7 |
Western Division
| No. 2 Alabama x$^ | 8 | – | 0 | 14 | – | 1 |
| No. 16 Texas A&M | 5 | – | 3 | 9 | – | 4 |
| No. 6 LSU | 5 | – | 3 | 10 | – | 3 |
| Mississippi State* | 4 | – | 4 | 8 | – | 5 |
| Auburn | 3 | – | 5 | 8 | – | 5 |
| Ole Miss | 1 | – | 7 | 5 | – | 7 |
| Arkansas | 0 | – | 8 | 2 | – | 10 |
Championship: Alabama 35, Georgia 28
^ – College Football Playoff participant; $ – Conference champion; x – Division champion/co-champions; * Mississippi State vacated four conference and eight total wins due to NCAA violations.; Rankings from AP Poll

2018 Sun Belt Conference football standings
| | Conf. | | | Overall |
| Team | W | | L | W | | L |
|---|---|---|---|---|---|---|
East Division
| Appalachian State xy$ | 7 | – | 1 | 11 | – | 2 |
| Troy x | 7 | – | 1 | 10 | – | 3 |
| Georgia Southern | 6 | – | 2 | 10 | – | 3 |
| Coastal Carolina | 2 | – | 6 | 5 | – | 7 |
| Georgia State | 1 | – | 7 | 2 | – | 10 |
West Division
| Louisiana xy | 5 | – | 3 | 7 | – | 7 |
| Arkansas State x | 5 | – | 3 | 8 | – | 5 |
| Louisiana–Monroe | 4 | – | 4 | 6 | – | 6 |
| South Alabama | 2 | – | 6 | 3 | – | 9 |
| Texas State | 1 | – | 7 | 3 | – | 9 |
Championship: Appalachian State 30, Louisiana 19
$ – Conference champion; x – Division champion/co-champions; y – Championship game participant

2018 NCAA Division I FBS independents football records
| | Conf. | | | Overall |
| Team | W | | L | W | | L |
|---|---|---|---|---|---|---|
| No. 5 Notre Dame ^ | | – | | 12 | – | 1 |
| No. 19 Army | | – | | 11 | – | 2 |
| BYU | | – | | 7 | – | 6 |
| Liberty | | – | | 6 | – | 6 |
| UMass | | – | | 4 | – | 8 |
| New Mexico State | | – | | 3 | – | 9 |
^ – College Football Playoff participant; Rankings from AP Poll

== Conference summaries ==
Rankings reflect the Week 14 AP Poll before the conference championship games were played.

| Conference | Champion | Runner-up | Score | Offensive Player of the Year | Defensive Player of the Year | Coach of the Year |
|---|---|---|---|---|---|---|
| ACC | No. 2 Clemson^{CFP} | No. 25 Pittsburgh | 42–10 | Travis Etienne (Clemson) | Clelin Ferrell (Clemson) | Dabo Swinney (Clemson) |
| American | No. 7 UCF | Memphis | 56–41 | McKenzie Milton (UCF) | Nate Harvey (East Carolina) | Luke Fickell (Cincinnati) |
| Big 12 | No. 5 Oklahoma^{CFP} | No. 9 Texas | 39–27 | Kyler Murray (Oklahoma) | David Long Jr. (West Virginia) | Lincoln Riley (Oklahoma); Matt Campbell (Iowa State) |
| Big Ten | No. 6 Ohio State | No. 21 Northwestern | 45–24 | Dwayne Haskins (Ohio State) | Devin Bush Jr. (Michigan) | Pat Fitzgerald (Northwestern) |
| C–USA | UAB | Middle Tennessee | 27–25 | Mason Fine (North Texas) (Note: Conference USA is the only FBS league that presents a Most Valuable Player award distinct from offensive and defensive awards. Middle Tennessee quarterback Brent Stockstill was named MVP.) | Jaylon Ferguson (Louisiana Tech) | Rick Stockstill (Middle Tennessee) |
| MAC | Northern Illinois | Buffalo | 30–29 | Tyree Jackson (Buffalo) | Sutton Smith (Northern Illinois) | Lance Leipold (Buffalo) |
| MW | No. 25 Fresno State | No. 19 Boise State | 19–16 ^{OT} | Brett Rypien (Boise State) | Jeff Allison (Fresno State) | Matt Wells (Utah State) |
| Pac-12 | No. 10 Washington | No. 17 Utah | 10–3 | Gardner Minshew (Washington State) | Ben Burr-Kirven (Washington) | Mike Leach (Washington State) |
| SEC | No. 1 Alabama^{CFP} | No. 4 Georgia | 35–28 | Tua Tagovailoa (Alabama) | Josh Allen (Kentucky) | Mark Stoops (Kentucky) |
| Sun Belt | Appalachian State | Louisiana | 30–19 | Zac Thomas (Appalachian State) | Ronheen Bingham (Arkansas State) | Scott Satterfield (Appalachian State) |

^{CFP} College Football Playoff participant

== FCS team wins over FBS teams ==
Italics denotes FCS teams.

| Date | Visiting team | Home team | Site | Result | Attendance | Ref. |
|---|---|---|---|---|---|---|
| August 30 | UC Davis | San José State | CEFCU Stadium • San Jose, California | 44–38 | 12,675 | |
| September 1 | No. 18 (FCS) Nicholls | Kansas | David Booth Kansas Memorial Stadium • Lawrence, Kansas | 26–23 ^{OT} | 24,305 | |
| September 1 | Northern Arizona | UTEP | Sun Bowl • El Paso, Texas | 30–10 | 17,271 | |
| September 1 | No. 19 (FCS) Villanova | Temple | Lincoln Financial Field • Philadelphia, Pennsylvania (Mayor's Cup) | 19–17 | 32,357 | |
| September 2 | No. 14 (FCS) North Carolina A&T | East Carolina | Dowdy–Ficklen Stadium • Greenville, North Carolina | 28–23 | 38,640 | |
| September 8 | No. 22 (FCS) Maine | Western Kentucky | Houchens Industries–L. T. Smith Stadium • Bowling Green, Kentucky | 31–28 | 15,178 | |
| September 22 | No. 16 (FCS) Illinois State | Colorado State | Canvas Stadium • Fort Collins, Colorado | 35–19 | 26,259 | |
^{#}Rankings from AP Poll released prior to game.

== Postseason ==
=== Bowl selections ===
There were 39 team-competitive post-season bowl games, with two teams advancing to a 40th – the CFP National Championship game. Normally, a team is required to have a .500 minimum winning percentage during the regular season to become bowl-eligible (six wins for an 11- or 12-game schedule, and seven wins for a 13-game schedule). If there are not enough winning teams to fulfill all open bowl slots, teams with losing records may be chosen to fill all 78 bowl slots. Additionally, on the rare occasion in which a conference champion does not meet eligibility requirements, they are usually still chosen for bowl games via tie-ins for their conference.

==== Bowl–eligible teams ====
- ACC (11): Boston College, Clemson, Duke, Georgia Tech, Miami, NC State, Pittsburgh, Syracuse, Virginia, Virginia Tech, Wake Forest
- American (7): Cincinnati, Houston, Memphis, South Florida, Temple, Tulane, UCF
- Big Ten (9): Iowa, Michigan, Michigan State, Minnesota, Northwestern, Ohio State, Penn State, Purdue, Wisconsin
- Big 12 (7): Baylor, Iowa State, Oklahoma, Oklahoma State, TCU, Texas, West Virginia
- C-USA (7): FIU, Louisiana Tech, Marshall, Middle Tennessee, North Texas, Southern Miss, UAB
- Independent (3): Army, BYU, Notre Dame
- MAC (7): Buffalo, Eastern Michigan, Miami (OH), Northern Illinois, Ohio, Toledo, Western Michigan
- Mountain West (7): Boise State, Fresno State, Hawaii, Nevada, San Diego State, Utah State, Wyoming
- Pac-12 (7): Arizona State, California, Oregon, Stanford, Utah, Washington, Washington State
- SEC (11): Alabama, Auburn, Florida, Georgia, Kentucky, LSU, Mississippi State, Missouri, South Carolina, Texas A&M, Vanderbilt
- Sun Belt (6): Appalachian State, Arkansas State, Georgia Southern, Louisiana, Louisiana–Monroe, Troy

Number of bowl berths available: 78
Number of bowl-eligible teams: 82

==== Bowl-eligible teams that were not invited ====
- C-USA (1): Southern Miss (6–5)
- MAC (1): Miami (Ohio) (6–6)
- Mountain West (1): Wyoming (6–6)
- Sun Belt (1): Louisiana–Monroe (6–6)

==== Bowl–ineligible teams ====
- American (5): Connecticut, East Carolina, Navy, Tulsa, SMU
- ACC (3): Florida State, Louisville, North Carolina
- Big Ten (5): Illinois, Indiana, Maryland, Nebraska, Rutgers
- Big 12 (3): Kansas, Kansas State, Texas Tech
- C-USA (7): Charlotte, Florida Atlantic, Old Dominion, Rice, UTEP, UTSA, Western Kentucky
- Independent (3): Liberty*, New Mexico State, UMass
- MAC (5): Akron, Ball State, Bowling Green, Central Michigan, Kent State
- Mountain West (5): Air Force, Colorado State, New Mexico, San Jose State, UNLV
- Pac-12 (5): Arizona, Colorado, Oregon State, UCLA, USC
- SEC (3): Arkansas, Ole Miss**, Tennessee
- Sun Belt (4): Coastal Carolina, Georgia State, South Alabama, Texas State

Number of bowl-ineligible teams: 48

* Liberty was not bowl-eligible until 2019 due to their transition from FCS to FBS. If Liberty had at least six wins and there were not enough bowl-eligible teams, they could have requested an NCAA waiver to participate in a bowl; Liberty did reach six wins, but there were more than enough bowl-eligible teams to fill the available bids.

** Ole Miss, who finished their regular season with a 5–7 record, was under a self-imposed two-year bowl ban that applied for the 2017 and 2018 seasons.

=== College Football Playoff ===
Starting with the 2014–15 postseason, six College Football Playoff (CFP) bowl games took turns hosting two semifinal playoff games on a rotating basis. For this season, the Cotton Bowl and the Orange Bowl hosted the semifinal games, with the winners advancing to the 2019 College Football Playoff National Championship at Levi's Stadium in Santa Clara, California.

Semifinals
December 29 – Orange Bowl Hard Rock Stadium, Miami Gardens
1 | Alabama | 45
4 | Oklahoma | 34
December 29 – Cotton Bowl AT&T Stadium, Arlington
2 | Clemson | 30
3 | Notre Dame | 3

Championship
January 7 – National Championship Levi's Stadium, Santa Clara
1 | Alabama | 16
2 | Clemson | 44

=== Conference performance in bowl games ===
| Conference | Total games | Wins | Losses | Pct. |
|---|---|---|---|---|
| SEC | 12 (11) | 6 | 5 | .545 |
| ACC | 12 | 6 | 6 | .500 |
| Big Ten | 9 | 5 | 4 | .556 |
| Pac-12 | 7 | 3 | 4 | .429 |
| Big 12 | 7 | 4 | 3 | .571 |
| MW | 6 (5) | 3 | 2 | .600 |
| The American | 7 | 2 | 5 | .286 |
| C-USA | 6 | 4 | 2 | .667 |
| MAC | 6 | 1 | 5 | .167 |
| Independents | 3 | 2 | 1 | .667 |
| Sun Belt | 5 | 3 | 2 | .600 |

== Awards and honors ==
=== Heisman Trophy voting ===
The Heisman Trophy is given to the year's most outstanding player

| Player | School | Position | 1st | 2nd | 3rd | Total |
|---|---|---|---|---|---|---|
| Kyler Murray | Oklahoma | QB | 517 | 278 | 60 | 2,167 |
| Tua Tagovailoa | Alabama | QB | 299 | 431 | 122 | 1,871 |
| Dwayne Haskins | Ohio State | QB | 46 | 111 | 423 | 783 |
| Will Grier | West Virginia | QB | 4 | 17 | 80 | 126 |
| Gardner Minshew | Washington State | QB | 6 | 15 | 74 | 122 |
| McKenzie Milton | UCF | QB | 4 | 4 | 19 | 39 |
| Travis Etienne | Clemson | RB | 0 | 6 | 17 | 29 |
| Quinnen Williams | Alabama | DT | 1 | 4 | 16 | 27 |
| Jonathan Taylor | Wisconsin | RB | 1 | 2 | 19 | 26 |
| Darrell Henderson | Memphis | RB | 0 | 3 | 15 | 21 |

=== Other overall ===
- Archie Griffin Award (MVP):Trevor Lawrence, QB, Clemson
- AP Player of the Year: Kyler Murray, QB, Oklahoma
- Chic Harley Award (Player of the Year): Dwayne Haskins, QB, Ohio State
- Maxwell Award (top player): Tua Tagovailoa, QB, Alabama
- SN Player of the Year: Tua Tagovailoa, QB, Alabama
- Walter Camp Award (top player): Tua Tagovailoa, QB, Alabama

=== Special overall ===
- Burlsworth Trophy (top player who began as walk-on): Hunter Renfrow, WR, Clemson
- Paul Hornung Award (most versatile player): Rondale Moore, WR/RS, Purdue
- Jon Cornish Trophy (top Canadian player): Nathan Rourke, QB, Ohio
- Campbell Trophy ("academic Heisman"): Christian Wilkins, DT, Clemson
- Wuerffel Trophy (humanitarian-athlete): Drue Tranquill, LB, Notre Dame
- Senior CLASS Award (senior student-athlete):
  - Joe Dineen Jr., LB, Kansas
  - Will Grier, QB, West Virginia
  - Hale Hentges, TE, Alabama
  - Patrick Laird, RB, California
  - Drew Lock, QB, Missouri
  - Bryce Love, RB, Stanford
  - Dalton Risner, OL, Kansas State
  - Cameron Smith, LB, USC
  - Christian Wilkins, DT, Clemson
  - Khari Willis, S, Michigan State

=== Offense ===
Quarterback

- Davey O'Brien Award: Kyler Murray, Oklahoma
- Johnny Unitas Award (senior/4th year quarterback): Gardner Minshew, Washington State
- Manning Award: Kyler Murray, Oklahoma
- Sammy Baugh Trophy (passing quarterback): Dwayne Haskins, Ohio State

Running back

- Doak Walker Award: Jonathan Taylor, Wisconsin

Wide receiver

- Fred Biletnikoff Award: Jerry Jeudy, Alabama

Tight end

- John Mackey Award: T. J. Hockenson, Iowa

Lineman:

- Dave Rimington Trophy (center): Garrett Bradbury, NC State
- Joe Moore Award (offensive line): Oklahoma

=== Defense ===
- Bronko Nagurski Trophy (defensive player): Josh Allen, LB, Kentucky
- Chuck Bednarik Award (defensive player): Josh Allen, Kentucky
- Lott Trophy (defensive impact): Josh Allen, Kentucky

Defensive front

- Bill Willis Award (defensive lineman): Quinnen Williams, Alabama
- Dick Butkus Award (linebacker): Devin White, LSU
- Jack Lambert Trophy (linebacker): Josh Allen, Kentucky
- Ted Hendricks Award (defensive end): Clelin Ferrell, Clemson

Defensive back

- Paycom Jim Thorpe Award: Deandre Baker, Georgia
- Jack Tatum Trophy: Grant Delpit, LSU

=== Special teams ===
- Lou Groza Award (placekicker): Andre Szmyt, Syracuse
- Ray Guy Award (punter): Braden Mann, Texas A&M
- Jet Award (return specialist): Savon Scarver, Utah State
- Peter Mortell Award (holder): Mac Loudermilk, UCF

=== Other positional awards ===
- Outland Trophy (interior lineman on either offense or defense): Quinnen Williams, Alabama

=== Coaches ===
- AFCA Coach of the Year: Mike Leach, Washington State
- AP Coach of the Year: Brian Kelly, Notre Dame
- Bobby Dodd Coach of the Year: Brian Kelly, Notre Dame
- Eddie Robinson Coach of the Year: Bill Clark, UAB
- George Munger Collegiate Coach of the Year: Jeff Monken, Army
- Home Depot Coach of the Year: Brian Kelly, Notre Dame
- Paul "Bear" Bryant Award: Dabo Swinney, Clemson
- Sporting News Coach of the Year: Bill Clark, UAB
- Walter Camp Coach of the Year: Nick Saban, Alabama

==== Assistants ====
- AFCA Assistant Coach of the Year: Jeff Faris, TE, Duke
- Broyles Award: Mike Locksley, OC, Alabama

== Rankings ==
=== CFB Playoff final rankings ===
On December 2, 2018, the College Football Playoff selection committee announced its final team rankings for the year.

| Rank | Team | W–L | Conference and standing | Bowl game |
|---|---|---|---|---|
| 1 | Alabama | 13–0 | SEC Champions | Orange Bowl (CFP Semifinal No. 1) |
| 2 | Clemson | 13–0 | ACC Champions | Cotton Bowl (CFP Semifinal No. 2) |
| 3 | Notre Dame | 12–0 | Independent | Cotton Bowl (CFP Semifinal No. 2) |
| 4 | Oklahoma | 12–1 | Big 12 Champions | Orange Bowl (CFP Semifinal No. 1) |
| 5 | Georgia | 11–2 | SEC East Division champions | Sugar Bowl |
| 6 | Ohio State | 12–1 | Big Ten Champions | Rose Bowl |
| 7 | Michigan | 10–2 | Big Ten East Division co-champions | Peach Bowl |
| 8 | UCF | 12–0 | AAC Champions | Fiesta Bowl |
| 9 | Washington | 10–3 | Pac-12 Champions | Rose Bowl |
| 10 | Florida | 9–3 | SEC East Division second place (tie) | Peach Bowl |
| 11 | LSU | 9–3 | SEC West Division second place (tie) | Fiesta Bowl |
| 12 | Penn State | 9–3 | Big Ten East Division third place | Citrus Bowl |
| 13 | Washington State | 10–2 | Pac-12 North Division co-champions | Alamo Bowl |
| 14 | Kentucky | 9–3 | SEC East Division second place (tie) | Citrus Bowl |
| 15 | Texas | 9–4 | Big 12 second place | Sugar Bowl |
| 16 | West Virginia | 8–3 | Big 12 third place (tie) | Camping World Bowl |
| 17 | Utah | 9–4 | Pac-12 South Division champions | Holiday Bowl |
| 18 | Mississippi State | 8–4 | SEC fourth place | Outback Bowl |
| 19 | Texas A&M | 8–4 | SEC second place (tie) | Gator Bowl |
| 20 | Syracuse | 9–3 | ACC Atlantic Division second place | Camping World Bowl |
| 21 | Fresno State | 11–2 | MW champions | Las Vegas Bowl |
| 22 | Northwestern | 8–5 | Big Ten West Division champions | Holiday Bowl |
| 23 | Missouri | 8-5 | SEC East Division fourth place (tie) | Liberty Bowl |
| 24 | Iowa State | 8–4 | Big 12 third place (tie) | Alamo Bowl |
| 25 | Boise State | 10–3 | MW Mountain Division champions | First Responder Bowl |

=== Final rankings ===
| Rank | Associated Press | Coaches' Poll |
|---|---|---|
| 1 | Clemson | Clemson |
| 2 | Alabama | Alabama |
| 3 | Ohio State | Ohio State |
| 4 | Oklahoma | Oklahoma |
| 5 | Notre Dame | Notre Dame |
| 6 | LSU | Florida |
| 7 | Florida | LSU |
| 8 | Georgia | Georgia |
| 9 | Texas | Texas |
| 10 | Washington State | Washington State |
| 11 | UCF | Kentucky |
| 12 | Kentucky | UCF |
| 13 | Washington | Washington |
| 14 | Michigan | Michigan |
| 15 | Syracuse | Syracuse |
| 16 | Texas A&M | Texas A&M |
| 17 | Penn State | Penn State |
| 18 | Fresno State | Fresno State |
| 19 | Army | Northwestern |
| 20 | West Virginia | Army |
| 21 | Northwestern | Utah State |
| 22 | Utah State | West Virginia |
| 23 | Boise State | Cincinnati |
| 24 | Cincinnati | Boise State |
| 25 | Iowa | Mississippi State |

== Coaching changes ==
=== Preseason and in-season ===
This is restricted to coaching changes taking place on or after May 1, 2018. For coaching changes that occurred earlier in 2018, see 2017 NCAA Division I FBS end-of-season coaching changes.

| Team | Outgoing coach | Date | Reason | Replacement |
|---|---|---|---|---|
| Bowling Green | Mike Jinks | October 14 | Fired | Carl Pelini (interim) |
| Maryland | D. J. Durkin | October 31 | Fired | Matt Canada (interim) |
| Louisville | Bobby Petrino | November 11 | Fired | Lorenzo Ward (interim) |
| Colorado | Mike MacIntyre | November 18 | Fired | Kurt Roper (interim) |
| Texas State | Everett Withers | November 18 | Fired | Chris Woods (interim) |
| East Carolina | Scottie Montgomery | November 29 | Fired | David Blackwell (interim) |
| Utah State | Matt Wells | November 29 | Hired as head coach by Texas Tech | Frank Maile (interim, bowl) |
| Appalachian State | Scott Satterfield | December 4 | Hired as head coach by Louisville | Mark Ivey (interim, bowl) |
| Temple | Geoff Collins | December 7 | Hired as head coach by Georgia Tech | Ed Foley (interim, bowl) |

=== End of season ===
This list includes coaching changes announced during the season that did not take effect until the end of the season.

| Team | Conf. | Outgoing coach | Date | Reason | Replacement |
|---|---|---|---|---|---|
| Kansas | Big 12 | David Beaty | November 4 | Fired (effective at end of season) | Les Miles |
| Charlotte | C-USA | Brad Lambert | November 18 | Fired (effective at end of season) | Will Healy |
| UMass | Independent | Mark Whipple | November 20 | Agreed to part ways | Walt Bell |
| Central Michigan | MAC | John Bonamego | November 23 | Fired | Jim McElwain |
| North Carolina | ACC | Larry Fedora | November 25 | Fired | Mack Brown |
| Texas Tech | Big 12 | Kliff Kingsbury | November 25 | Fired | Matt Wells |
| Western Kentucky | C-USA | Mike Sanford | November 25 | Fired | Tyson Helton |
| Bowling Green | MAC | Carl Pelini (interim) | November 28 | Permanent replacement | Scot Loeffler |
| Georgia Tech | ACC | Paul Johnson | November 28 | Retired (effective after Georgia Tech's bowl game) | Geoff Collins |
| Texas State | Sun Belt | Chris Woods (interim) | November 28 | Permanent replacement | Jake Spavital |
| Kansas State | Big 12 | Bill Snyder | December 2 | Retired | Chris Klieman |
| Akron | MAC | Terry Bowden | December 2 | Fired | Tom Arth |
| East Carolina | American | David Blackwell (interim) | December 3 | Permanent replacement | Mike Houston |
| Liberty | Independent | Turner Gill | December 3 | Retired | Hugh Freeze |
| Ohio State | Big Ten | Urban Meyer | December 4 | Retired (effective at end of season) | Ryan Day |
| Louisville | ACC | Lorenzo Ward (interim) | December 4 | Permanent replacement | Scott Satterfield |
| Maryland | Big Ten | Matt Canada (interim) | December 4 | Permanent replacement | Mike Locksley |
| Colorado | Pac-12 | Kurt Roper (interim) | December 5 | Permanent replacement | Mel Tucker |
| Utah State | MW | Frank Maile (interim) | December 9 | Permanent replacement | Gary Andersen |
| Appalachian State | Sun Belt | Mark Ivey (interim) | December 13 | Permanent replacement | Eliah Drinkwitz |
| Temple | American | Ed Foley (interim) | December 13 | Permanent replacement | Rod Carey |
| Houston | American | Major Applewhite | December 30 | Fired | Dana Holgorsen |
| Miami | ACC | Mark Richt | December 30 | Retired | Manny Diaz |
| West Virginia | Big 12 | Dana Holgorsen | January 1 | Hired as head coach by Houston | Neal Brown |
| Troy | Sun Belt | Neal Brown | January 4 | Hired as head coach by West Virginia | Chip Lindsey |
| Northern Illinois | MAC | Rod Carey | January 10 | Hired as head coach by Temple | Thomas Hammock |
| Coastal Carolina | Sun Belt | Joe Moglia | January 18 | Resigned | Jamey Chadwell |

== Television viewers and ratings ==
=== Most watched regular-season games ===
All times Eastern. Rankings are from the AP Poll (before 10/30) and CFP Rankings (thereafter).

| Rank | Date | Matchup | | | | Network | Viewers (millions) | TV Rating | Significance |
|---|---|---|---|---|---|---|---|---|---|
| 1 | November 24, 12:00pm | No. 4 Michigan | 39 | No. 10 Ohio State | 62 | FOX | 13.20 | 7.5 | College GameDay/Rivalry |
| 2 | November 3, 8:00pm | No. 1 Alabama | 29 | No. 3 LSU | 0 | CBS | 11.54 | 6.6 | College GameDay/Rivalry |
| 3 | September 29, 7:30pm | No. 4 Ohio State | 27 | No. 9 Penn State | 26 | ABC | 9.14 | 5.3 | College GameDay/Rivalry |
| 4 | November 24, 3:30pm | No. 1 Alabama | 52 | Auburn | 21 | CBS | 9.13 | 5.1 | Rivalry |
| 5 | December 8, 3:00pm | Navy | 10 | Army | 17 | CBS | 8.05 | 5.0 | College GameDay/Rivalry |
| 6 | November 24, 8:00pm | No. 3 Notre Dame | 24 | USC | 17 | ABC | 7.74 | 4.4 | Rivalry |
| 7 | September 15, 8:00pm | No. 4 Ohio State | 40 | No. 15 TCU | 28 | ABC | 7.23 | 4.25 | College GameDay |
| 8 | September 1, 7:30pm | No. 14 Michigan | 17 | No. 12 Notre Dame | 24 | NBC | 7.09 | 4.0 | College GameDay/Rivalry |
| 9 | September 2, 7:30pm | No. 8 Miami (FL) | 17 | No. 25 LSU | 33 | ABC | 6.56 | 3.8 | Advocare Classic |
| 10 | October 27, 3:30pm | No. 9 Florida | 17 | No. 7 Georgia | 36 | CBS | 6.35 | 3.9 | College GameDay/Rivalry |

=== Conference championship games ===
All times Eastern. Rankings are from the CFP Rankings.

| Rank | Date | Matchup | | | | Network | Viewers (millions) | TV Rating | Conference | Location |
|---|---|---|---|---|---|---|---|---|---|---|
| 1 | December 1, 4:00pm | No. 1 Alabama (West) | 35 | No. 4 Georgia (East) | 28 | CBS | 17.5 | 10.1 | SEC | Mercedes-Benz Stadium, Atlanta, GA |
| 2 | December 1, 12:00pm | No. 14 Texas (No. 2 seed) | 27 | No. 5 Oklahoma (No. 1 seed) | 39 | ABC | 10.2 | 6.2 | Big 12 | AT&T Stadium, Arlington, TX |
| 3 | December 1, 8:00pm | No. 21 Northwestern (West) | 21 | No. 6 Ohio State (East) | 45 | FOX | 8.7 | 5.0 | Big Ten | Lucas Oil Stadium, Indianapolis, IN |
| 4 | December 1, 8:00pm | No. 2 Clemson (Atlantic) | 42 | Pittsburgh (Coastal) | 10 | ABC | 4.2 | 2.5 | ACC | Bank of America Stadium, Charlotte, NC |
| 5 | November 30, 8:00pm | No. 17 Utah (South) | 3 | No. 11 Washington (North) | 10 | FOX | 4.1 | 2.6 | Pac-12 | Levi's Stadium, Santa Clara, CA |
| 6 | December 1, 3:30pm | Memphis (West) | 41 | No. 8 UCF (East) | 56 | ABC | 3.3 | 2.1 | American | Spectrum Stadium, Orlando, FL |
| 7 | December 1, 7:45pm | No. 25 Fresno State (West) | 19 | No. 22 Boise State (Mountain) | 16 | ESPN | 1.0 | 0.6 | MW | Albertsons Stadium, Boise, ID |
| 8 | December 1, 12:00pm | Louisiana (West) | 19 | Appalachian State (East) | 30 | ESPN | 0.90 | 0.6 | Sun Belt | Kidd Brewer Stadium, Boone, NC |
| 9 | November 30, 7:00pm | Northern Illinois (West) | 30 | Buffalo (East) | 29 | ESPN2 | 0.59 | 0.4 | MAC | Ford Field, Detroit, MI |
| 10 | December 1, 1:30pm | UAB (West) | 27 | Middle Tennessee (East) | 25 | CBSSN | n.a | n.a | C-USA | Johnny "Red" Floyd Stadium, Murfreesboro, TN |

=== Most watched non-CFP bowl games ===
All times Eastern. Rankings are from the CFP Rankings.

| Rank | Game | Date | Matchup | | | | Network | Viewers (millions) | TV Rating | Location |
|---|---|---|---|---|---|---|---|---|---|---|
| 1 | Rose Bowl | January 1, 2019, 5:00pm | No. 9 Washington | 23 | No. 6 Ohio State | 28 | ESPN/ESPN2 | 16.8 | 8.9 | Rose Bowl, Pasadena, CA |
| 2 | Sugar Bowl | January 1, 2019, 8:30pm | No. 15 Texas | 28 | No. 5 Georgia | 21 | ESPN/ESPN2 | 13.3 | 7.3 | Mercedes-Benz Superdome, New Orleans, Louisiana |
| 3 | Fiesta Bowl | January 1, 2019, 1:00pm | No. 11 LSU | 40 | No. 8 UCF | 32 | ESPN | 8.5 | 4.7 | State Farm Stadium, Glendale, Arizona |
| 4 | Peach Bowl | December 29, 2018, 12:00pm | No. 10 Florida | 41 | No. 7 Michigan | 15 | ESPN | 8.4 | 5.0 | Mercedes-Benz Stadium, Atlanta, Georgia |
| 5 | Citrus Bowl | January 1, 2019 1:00pm | No. 14 Kentucky | 27 | No. 12 Penn State | 24 | ABC | 7.7 | 4.4 | Camping World Stadium, Orlando, Florida |
| 6 | Alamo Bowl | December 28, 2018, 9:00pm | No. 24 Iowa State | 26 | No. 13 Washington State | 28 | ESPN | 5.5 | 3.2 | Alamodome, San Antonio, Texas |
| 7 | Gator Bowl | December 31, 2018, 8:00pm | NC State | 13 | No. 19 Texas A&M | 52 | ESPN | 5.1 | 2.7 | TIAA Bank Field, Jacksonville, Florida |
| 8 | Camping World Bowl | December 28, 2018, 5:15pm | No. 18 West Virginia | 18 | No. 20 Syracuse | 34 | ESPN | 4.8 | 2.8 | Camping World Stadium, Orlando, Florida |
| 9 | Liberty Bowl | December 31, 2018, 3:45pm | No. 23 Missouri | 33 | Oklahoma State | 38 | ESPN | 3.8 | 2.3 | Liberty Bowl, Memphis, Tennessee |
| 10 | Pinstripe Bowl | December 27, 2018, 5:15pm | Miami | 3 | Wisconsin | 35 | ESPN | 3.8 | 2.3 | Yankee Stadium, New York, New York |

=== College Football Playoff ===
All times Eastern. Rankings are from the CFP Rankings.

| Game | Date | Matchup | | | | Network | Viewers (millions) | TV Rating | Location |
|---|---|---|---|---|---|---|---|---|---|
| Cotton Bowl (semifinal) | December 29, 2018, 4:00pm | No. 3 Notre Dame | 3 | No. 2 Clemson | 30 | ESPN | 16.9 | 9.4 | AT&T Stadium, Arlington, TX |
| Orange Bowl (semifinal) | December 29, 2018, 8:00pm | No. 4 Oklahoma | 34 | No. 1 Alabama | 45 | ESPN | 19.1 | 9.9 | Hard Rock Stadium, Miami Gardens, FL |
| National Championship | January 7, 2019, 8:00pm | No. 2 Clemson | 44 | No. 1 Alabama | 16 | ESPN | 25.3 | 13.6 | Levi's Stadium, Santa Clara, CA |

== Attendances ==
| Team | G | Total | Average |
|---|---|---|---|
| Air Force | 6 | 166,205 | 27,701 |
| Akron | 5 | 92,575 | 18,515 |
| Alabama | 7 | 710,931 | 101,562 |
| Appalachian State | 6 | 131,716 | 21,953 |
| Arizona | 7 | 318,051 | 45,436 |
| Arizona State | 6 | 291,091 | 48,515 |
| Arkansas | 7 | 419,186 | 59,884 |
| Arkansas State | 6 | 119,001 | 19,834 |
| Army West Point | 6 | 190,156 | 31,693 |
| Auburn | 7 | 591,236 | 84,462 |
| Ball State | 6 | 61,725 | 10,288 |
| Baylor | 6 | 248,017 | 41,336 |
| Boise State | 7 | 231,474 | 33,068 |
| Boston College | 7 | 263,363 | 37,623 |
| Bowling Green | 6 | 90,264 | 15,044 |
| Buffalo | 6 | 110,280 | 18,380 |
| BYU | 6 | 314,855 | 52,476 |
| California | 7 | 300,061 | 42,866 |
| Central Michigan | 6 | 77,038 | 12,840 |
| Charlotte | 6 | 70,263 | 11,711 |
| Cincinnati | 6 | 183,112 | 30,519 |
| Clemson | 7 | 562,799 | 80,400 |
| Coastal Carolina | 5 | 52,313 | 10,463 |
| Colorado | 6 | 274,852 | 45,809 |
| Colorado State | 6 | 177,025 | 29,504 |
| Duke | 6 | 159,878 | 26,646 |
| East Carolina | 7 | 230,356 | 32,908 |
| Eastern Michigan | 6 | 95,632 | 15,939 |
| FIU | 7 | 109,797 | 15,685 |
| Florida Atlantic | 6 | 102,308 | 17,051 |
| Florida | 7 | 576,299 | 82,328 |
| Florida State | 7 | 478,013 | 68,288 |
| Fresno State | 6 | 189,016 | 31,503 |
| Georgia Southern | 6 | 100,814 | 16,802 |
| Georgia | 7 | 649,222 | 92,746 |
| Georgia State | 6 | 99,691 | 16,615 |
| Georgia Tech | 6 | 258,523 | 43,087 |
| Hawaii | 8 | 205,455 | 25,682 |
| Houston | 6 | 179,029 | 29,838 |
| Illinois | 6 | 216,907 | 36,151 |
| Indiana | 7 | 286,753 | 40,965 |
| Iowa | 7 | 476,302 | 68,043 |
| Iowa State | 7 | 392,072 | 56,010 |
| Kansas | 6 | 116,544 | 19,424 |
| Kansas State | 7 | 348,165 | 49,738 |
| Kent State | 5 | 65,590 | 13,118 |
| Kentucky | 7 | 385,820 | 55,117 |
| Louisiana–Monroe | 5 | 71,048 | 14,210 |
| Louisiana | 6 | 111,303 | 18,551 |
| Louisiana Tech | 5 | 87,623 | 17,525 |
| Louisville | 7 | 351,755 | 50,251 |
| LSU | 7 | 705,733 | 100,819 |
| Marshall | 6 | 144,377 | 24,063 |
| Maryland | 6 | 201,562 | 33,594 |
| Massachusetts | 6 | 62,312 | 10,385 |
| Memphis | 7 | 211,247 | 30,178 |
| Miami Hurricanes | 6 | 368,814 | 61,469 |
| Miami RedHawks | 6 | 85,518 | 14,253 |
| Michigan | 7 | 775,156 | 110,737 |
| Michigan State | 7 | 508,088 | 72,584 |
| Middle Tennessee | 6 | 93,462 | 15,577 |
| Minnesota | 7 | 265,407 | 37,915 |
| Mississippi State | 7 | 406,401 | 58,057 |
| Missouri | 7 | 360,261 | 51,466 |
| Navy | 5 | 157,320 | 31,464 |
| NC State | 7 | 397,982 | 56,855 |
| Nebraska | 7 | 623,240 | 89,034 |
| Nevada | 6 | 103,085 | 17,181 |
| New Mexico | 6 | 99,523 | 16,587 |
| New Mexico State | 5 | 68,529 | 13,706 |
| North Carolina | 5 | 218,111 | 43,622 |
| North Texas | 6 | 140,131 | 23,355 |
| Northern Illinois | 5 | 52,019 | 10,404 |
| Northwestern | 7 | 307,112 | 43,873 |
| Notre Dame | 6 | 465,732 | 77,622 |
| Ohio | 6 | 97,374 | 16,229 |
| Ohio State | 7 | 713,630 | 101,947 |
| Oklahoma | 7 | 607,146 | 86,735 |
| Oklahoma State | 7 | 374,793 | 53,542 |
| Old Dominion | 6 | 117,798 | 19,633 |
| Ole Miss | 7 | 389,794 | 55,685 |
| Oregon | 7 | 371,114 | 53,016 |
| Oregon State | 6 | 211,252 | 35,209 |
| Penn State | 7 | 738,396 | 105,485 |
| Pittsburgh | 6 | 250,178 | 41,696 |
| Purdue | 7 | 357,839 | 51,120 |
| Rice | 6 | 121,029 | 20,172 |
| Rutgers | 7 | 264,596 | 37,799 |
| San Diego State | 7 | 220,071 | 31,439 |
| San Jose State | 5 | 71,276 | 14,255 |
| SMU | 6 | 116,299 | 19,383 |
| South Alabama | 6 | 96,383 | 16,064 |
| South Carolina | 7 | 515,396 | 73,628 |
| South Florida | 6 | 231,102 | 38,517 |
| Southern California | 6 | 332,692 | 55,449 |
| Southern Miss | 6 | 129,690 | 21,615 |
| Stanford | 6 | 227,052 | 37,842 |
| Syracuse | 6 | 222,260 | 37,043 |
| TCU | 6 | 257,205 | 42,868 |
| Temple | 6 | 170,821 | 28,470 |
| Tennessee | 7 | 650,887 | 92,984 |
| Texas | 6 | 586,277 | 97,713 |
| Texas A&M | 7 | 698,908 | 99,844 |
| Texas State | 6 | 78,689 | 13,115 |
| Texas Tech | 6 | 336,203 | 56,034 |
| Toledo | 7 | 149,462 | 21,352 |
| Troy | 6 | 147,160 | 24,527 |
| Tulane | 6 | 108,090 | 18,015 |
| Tulsa | 6 | 102,590 | 17,098 |
| UAB | 6 | 145,747 | 24,291 |
| UCF | 8 | 352,148 | 44,019 |
| UCLA | 7 | 358,147 | 51,164 |
| UConn | 6 | 125,543 | 20,924 |
| UNLV | 6 | 100,935 | 16,823 |
| Utah | 6 | 277,992 | 46,332 |
| Utah State | 6 | 112,302 | 18,717 |
| UTEP | 6 | 84,931 | 14,155 |
| UTSA | 6 | 148,257 | 24,710 |
| Vanderbilt | 7 | 196,313 | 28,045 |
| Virginia | 6 | 238,232 | 39,705 |
| Virginia Tech | 7 | 417,019 | 59,574 |
| Wake Forest | 7 | 187,892 | 26,842 |
| Washington | 6 | 414,405 | 69,068 |
| Washington State | 7 | 210,637 | 30,091 |
| West Virginia | 6 | 348,947 | 58,158 |
| Western Kentucky | 5 | 71,157 | 14,231 |
| Western Michigan | 6 | 109,756 | 18,293 |
| Wisconsin | 7 | 540,072 | 77,153 |
| Wyoming | 6 | 113,277 | 18,880 |

== See also ==
- 2018 NCAA Division I FCS football season
- 2018 NCAA Division II football season
- 2018 NCAA Division III football season
- 2018 NAIA football season
