= Thomas Durkin =

Thomas Durkin may refer to:

- Thomas Durkin (rugby league) (1895–1958), rugby league footballer of the 1920s
- Thomas Anthony Durkin (1946/47–2025), American criminal defense attorney
- Thomas M. Durkin (born 1953), judge on the United States District Court for the Northern District of Illinois

== See also ==
- Tom Durkin (disambiguation)
