= 2018 Maryland Terrapins football team =

American college football season

2018 Maryland Terrapins football
- Conference: Big Ten Conference
- East Division
- Record: 5–7 (3–6 Big Ten)
- Head coach: Matt Canada (interim; 1st season)
- Offensive scheme: Multiple pro-style
- Defensive coordinator: Andy Buh (3rd season)
- Base defense: 4–2–5
- Home stadium: Byrd Stadium

2018 Big Ten Conference football standings
| | Conf. | | | Overall |
| Team | W | | L | W | | L |
|---|---|---|---|---|---|---|
East Division
| No. 3 Ohio State xy$ | 8 | – | 1 | 13 | – | 1 |
| No. 14 Michigan x | 8 | – | 1 | 10 | – | 3 |
| No. 17 Penn State | 6 | – | 3 | 9 | – | 4 |
| Michigan State | 5 | – | 4 | 7 | – | 6 |
| Maryland | 3 | – | 6 | 5 | – | 7 |
| Indiana | 2 | – | 7 | 5 | – | 7 |
| Rutgers | 0 | – | 9 | 1 | – | 11 |
West Division
| No. 21 Northwestern xy | 8 | – | 1 | 9 | – | 5 |
| Wisconsin | 5 | – | 4 | 8 | – | 5 |
| No. 25 Iowa | 5 | – | 4 | 9 | – | 4 |
| Purdue | 5 | – | 4 | 6 | – | 7 |
| Minnesota | 3 | – | 6 | 7 | – | 6 |
| Nebraska | 3 | – | 6 | 4 | – | 8 |
| Illinois | 2 | – | 7 | 4 | – | 8 |
Championship: Ohio State 45, Northwestern 24
$ – Conference champion; x – Division champion/co-champions; y – Championship game participant; Rankings from AP Poll

The 2018 Maryland Terrapins football team represented the University of Maryland during the 2018 NCAA Division I FBS football season. The Terrapins played their home games at Maryland Stadium in College Park, Maryland and competed in the East Division of the Big Ten Conference.

Following the death of offensive lineman Jordan McNair during a spring football practice, significant scrutiny was laid on head coach D. J. Durkin and his football staff. Following an investigation, Durkin was suspended and offensive coordinator Matt Canada was named interim coach. Durkin was fired on October 31, despite an internal investigation finding that the team did not have a "toxic culture".

In the Terrapins' first game of the year, they defeated then-No. 23 Texas in a game played at Northwest Stadium, home of the Washington Commanders. In the team's home opener two weeks later, the team was upset by Temple. In Big Ten Conference play, the team secured wins against Minnesota, Rutgers, and Illinois. In a late-November game against eventual Big Ten champion Ohio State, Maryland took the Buckeyes to overtime, but lost on an unsuccessful two-point conversion attempt that would have won the game. Maryland finished in fifth in the East Division with a record of 5–7, 3–6 in conference play.

Kasim Hill started at quarterback for the Terrapins until he suffered a torn ACL in the game against Indiana on November 10. Tyrell Pigrome started the remainder of the season. Running back Anthony McFarland Jr. led the team with over 1,000 yards rushing. On defense, linebacker Tre Watson led the Big Ten Conference with five interceptions and was named first team all-conference by the media.

== Player death and culture controversy ==
On May 29, Jordan McNair, a 19-year-old offensive lineman for Maryland, collapsed during a strenuous practice. He was hospitalized after visibly showing signs of extreme exhaustion with a body temperature of 106 °F (41 °C) recorded upon arrival. He was later airlifted to the R Adams Cowley Shock Trauma Center to receive an emergency liver transplant, where he died on June 13. Though no cause of death was initially listed for McNair, findings published by ESPN in August show that he likely died of a heat stroke, with teammates and medical staff noticing an apparent seizure one hour before a 911 call was placed. This corroborated a statement made by his parents a month earlier.

An investigation started immediately after his death showed that McNair first showed signs of heat illness at 4:59 p.m. but did not arrive at the hospital for treatment until 6:36 p.m. A second investigation, into the culture of the Maryland football program, was started after ESPN published an investigative article in August 2018. Multiple staffers were suspended and the strength and conditioning coach named as the main abuser in the ESPN report, Rick Court, resigned almost immediately after being suspended. Head coach D.J. Durkin was also suspended and Matt Canada was named interim coach; after the second investigation concluded that Maryland football did not have, by definition, a toxic culture, Durkin was reinstated on October 30. Following intense uproar and protest over his return, Durkin was personally fired the next day by University President Wallace Loh.

== Preseason ==
=== Award watch lists ===
| Award | Player | Position | Year |
|---|---|---|---|
| Rimington Trophy | Brendan Moore | C | SR |
| Maxwell Award | Ty Johnson | RB | SR |
| Ray Guy Award | Wade Lees | P | JR |
| Paul Hornung Award | Ty Johnson | RB/KR | SR |
| Wuerffel Trophy | Taivon Jacobs | WR | SR |
| Earl Campbell Tyler Rose Award | Brendon Moore | C | SR |

== Schedule ==
| Date | Time | Opponent | Site | TV | Result | Attendance |
|---|---|---|---|---|---|---|
| September 1 | 12:00 p.m. | vs. No. 23 Texas* | FedExField; Landover, MD | FS1 | W 34–29 | 47,641 |
| September 8 | 6:00 p.m. | at Bowling Green* | Doyt Perry Stadium; Bowling Green, OH | ESPN+ | W 45–14 | 16,142 |
| September 15 | 12:00 p.m. | Temple* | Maryland Stadium; College Park, MD | BTN | L 14–35 | 32,057 |
| September 22 | 12:00 p.m. | Minnesota | Maryland Stadium; College Park, MD | BTN | W 42–13 | 36,211 |
| October 6 | 12:00 p.m. | at No. 15 Michigan | Michigan Stadium; Ann Arbor, MI | ABC | L 21–42 | 110,452 |
| October 13 | 12:00 p.m. | Rutgers^{†} | Maryland Stadium; College Park, MD | BTN | W 34–7 | 32,995 |
| October 20 | 12:00 p.m. | at No. 19 Iowa | Kinnick Stadium; Iowa City, IA | ESPN2 | L 0–23 | 69,250 |
| October 27 | 3:30 p.m. | Illinois | Maryland Stadium; College Park, MD | BTN | W 63–33 | 30,387 |
| November 3 | 12:00 p.m. | Michigan State | Maryland Stadium; College Park, MD | ESPN2 | L 3–24 | 31,735 |
| November 10 | 12:00 p.m. | at Indiana | Memorial Stadium; Bloomington, IN | BTN | L 32–34 | 35,264 |
| November 17 | 12:00 p.m. | No. 9 Ohio State | Maryland Stadium; College Park, MD | ABC | L 51–52 ^{OT} | 38,117 |
| November 24 | 3:30 p.m. | at No. 15 Penn State | Beaver Stadium; University Park, PA (rivalry) | ABC | L 3–38 | 98,422 |
*Non-conference game; ^{†}Homecoming; Rankings from AP Poll released prior to the game; All times are in Eastern time

== Game summaries ==
=== vs Texas ===
| | 1 | 2 | 3 | 4 | Total |
|---|---|---|---|---|---|
| No. 23 Longhorns | 7 | 15 | 7 | 0 | 29 |
| Terrapins | 14 | 10 | 0 | 10 | 34 |

After a tumultuous offseason, Maryland emerged victorious against Texas 34-29 after shaking off a 30+ minute thunder delay. In Matt Canada's debut as interim head coach, Maryland forced three turnovers in the final 6:09 of the game after losing a 24-7 lead. Freshman Jeshaun Jones, in his first career game, completed the trifecta by passing for a touchdown, receiving a touchdown, and rushing for a touchdown. Most notably, the Terrapins paid tribute to the late Jordan McNair by lining up with 10 players on their first offensive play. Maryland waited for a delay of game penalty and Texas declined the penalty in a show of good sportsmanship.

=== At Bowling Green ===
| | 1 | 2 | 3 | 4 | Total |
|---|---|---|---|---|---|
| Terrapins | 0 | 10 | 7 | 28 | 45 |
| Falcons | 7 | 7 | 0 | 0 | 14 |

=== Temple ===
| | 1 | 2 | 3 | 4 | Total |
|---|---|---|---|---|---|
| Owls | 7 | 14 | 7 | 7 | 35 |
| Terrapins | 0 | 7 | 0 | 7 | 14 |

=== Minnesota ===
| | 1 | 2 | 3 | 4 | Total |
|---|---|---|---|---|---|
| Golden Gophers | 0 | 10 | 3 | 0 | 13 |
| Terrapins | 14 | 7 | 14 | 7 | 42 |

=== At Michigan ===
| | 1 | 2 | 3 | 4 | Total |
|---|---|---|---|---|---|
| Terrapins | 7 | 0 | 0 | 14 | 21 |
| No. 15 Wolverines | 3 | 14 | 10 | 15 | 42 |

=== Rutgers ===
| | 1 | 2 | 3 | 4 | Total |
|---|---|---|---|---|---|
| Scarlet Knights | 0 | 0 | 0 | 7 | 7 |
| Terrapins | 10 | 14 | 10 | 0 | 34 |

=== At Iowa ===
| | 1 | 2 | 3 | 4 | Total |
|---|---|---|---|---|---|
| Terrapins | 0 | 0 | 0 | 0 | 0 |
| No. 19 Hawkeyes | 3 | 10 | 10 | 0 | 23 |

=== Illinois ===
| | 1 | 2 | 3 | 4 | Total |
|---|---|---|---|---|---|
| Fighting Illini | 3 | 6 | 10 | 14 | 33 |
| Terrapins | 14 | 14 | 21 | 14 | 63 |

=== Michigan State ===
| | 1 | 2 | 3 | 4 | Total |
|---|---|---|---|---|---|
| Spartans | 10 | 0 | 7 | 7 | 24 |
| Terrapins | 0 | 3 | 0 | 0 | 3 |

=== At Indiana ===
| | 1 | 2 | 3 | 4 | Total |
|---|---|---|---|---|---|
| Terrapins | 6 | 9 | 8 | 9 | 32 |
| Hoosiers | 0 | 21 | 10 | 3 | 34 |

=== Ohio State ===
| | 1 | 2 | 3 | 4 | OT | Total |
|---|---|---|---|---|---|---|
| No. 9 Buckeyes | 3 | 14 | 7 | 21 | 7 | 52 |
| Terrapins | 17 | 7 | 7 | 14 | 6 | 51 |

=== At Penn State ===
| | 1 | 2 | 3 | 4 | Total |
|---|---|---|---|---|---|
| Terrapins | 3 | 0 | 0 | 0 | 3 |
| No. 15 Nittany Lions | 14 | 3 | 7 | 14 | 38 |

== Roster ==
2018 Maryland Terrapins football team roster
Players
Coaches
Offense

| Pos. | # | Name | Class |
|---|---|---|---|
| WR | 1 | D. J. Turner | Jr |
| RB | 2 | Lorenzo Harrison III | Jr |
| QB | 3 | Tyrrell Pigrome | So |
| QB | 4 | Brian Clarkin | Fr |
| RB | 5 | Anthony McFarland Jr. | Fr |
| WR | 6 | Jeshaun Jones | Fr |
| WR | 7 | Dontay Demus | Fr |
| RB | 8 | Tayon Fleet-Davis | So |
| WR | 9 | Jahrvis Davenport | Sr |
| WR | 10 | Jayden Comma | Fr |
| QB | 11 | Kasim Hill | Fr |
| WR | 12 | Tavion Jacobs | Sr |
| QB | 13 | Tyler Desue | Fr |
| WR | 14 | Tahj Capehart | So |
| QB | 15 | Legend Brumbaugh | So |
| WR | 15 | Brian Cobbs | Fr |
| QB | 16 | Brayden Hawkins | Fr |
| TE | 17 | Chig Okonkwo | Fr |
| QB | 18 | Max Bortenschlager | Jr |
| WR | 19 | M. J. Jarrell | Fr |
| RB | 20 | Javon Leake | So |
| WR | 21 | Darryl Jones | Fr |
| RB | 23 | Ikechukwu Ogwuegbu | Jr |
| RB | 6 | Ty Johnson | Jr |
| WR | 26 | Justin Brown | Fr |
| RB | 34 | Jake Funk | Jr |
| TE | 45 | Zack Roski | So |
| TE | 46 | Robert Schwob | So |
| OL | 52 | Evan Gregory | Fr |
| OL | 54 | Spencer Anderson | Fr |
| OL | 55 | Derwin Gray | Jr |
| OL | 57 | T. J. Bradley | So |
| OL | 58 | Damian Prince | Sr |
| OL | 63 | Tyler Hamilton | So |
| OL | 64 | Brendan Moore | Sr |
| OL | 67 | Tyran Hunt | Fr |
| OL | 68 | Ellis McKennie | Jr |
| OL | 69 | Gabriel Matthews | Fr |
| OL | 70 | Sean Christie | Sr |
| OL | 71 | Jaelyn Duncan | Fr |
| OL | 72 | Marcus Minor | So |
| OL | 73 | Johnny Jordan | So |
| OL | 74 | Brian Plummer | So |
| OL | 75 | Terrence Davis | Jr |
| OL | 76 | Jack Wagman | So |
| OL | 79 | Jordan McNair | So |
| TE | 80 | Noah Barnes | So |
| TE | 82 | Avery Edwards | Sr |
| WR | 83 | Carlos Carriere | Fr |
| WR | 84 | Chris Jones | Sr |
| WR | 85 | Sean Nelson | Fr |
| TE | 87 | Michael Cornwell | Sr |
| TE | 89 | Andrew Park | Fr |

Defense

| Pos. | # | Name | Class |
|---|---|---|---|
| DB | 2 | Ravon Davis | Sr |
| DB | 3 | Qwuantrezz Knight | Jr |
| DB | 4 | Darnell Savage | Sr |
| DL | 6 | Jesse Aniebonam | Sr |
| DB | 7 | Tino Ellis | Jr |
| DB | 8 | Marcus Lewis | Jr |
| DL | 9 | Byron Cowart | Jr |
| DL | 10 | Tyler Baylor | Fr |
| DB | 11 | Fofie Bazzie | Fr |
| DB | 12 | Vincent Flythe | Fr |
| DB | 13 | Rayshad Lewis | So |
| DB | 14 | Deon Jones | Fr |
| DB | 15 | Ken Montgomery | Fr |
| LB | 16 | Ayinde Eley | Fr |
| LB | 18 | Jordan Mosley | Fr |
| LB | 19 | Ahmad McCullough | Fr |
| DB | 20 | Antwaine Richardson | Jr |
| DB | 21 | Raymond Boone | Fr |
| ILB | 22 | Isaiah Davis | Jr |
| DB | 23 | Fa′Najae Gotay | Fr |
| DB | 24 | Kenny Bennett | Fr |
| DB | 25 | Antoine Brooks | Jr |
| DB | 26 | Chigozie Onyekwere | Sr |
| DL | 27 | Bryce Brand | So |
| LB | 30 | Durell Nchami | Fr |
| LB | 31 | Nnamdi Egbuaba | Sr |
| DL | 32 | Antonio Dicerbo | So |
| LB | 32 | Bruce Miller | Sr |
| LB | 33 | Tre Watson | Sr |
| DB | 38 | Freddie Montgomery | Fr |
| LB | 39 | Steve Baca | Jr |
| LB | 40 | Tanyi Makia | Fr |
| LB | 42 | Nick Underwood | Jr |
| LB | 43 | Wyatt Cook | Sr |
| LB | 44 | Chance Campbell | Fr |
| LB | 48 | Oladimeji Olayinka | Fr |
| LB | 49 | David Brownlee | Fr |
| DL | 52 | Oluwaseun Oluwatimi | Jr |
| DL | 55 | Cam Spence | Fr |
| DL | 59 | Keiron Howard | Jr |
| DL | 77 | Cherokee Glasgow | Fr |
| DL | 88 | Jalen Alexander | Fr |
| DL | 90 | B'Ahmad Miller | Fr |
| DL | 91 | Adam McLean | Jr |
| DL | 92 | Austin Fontaine | Fr |
| DL | 93 | Oseh Saine | Jr |
| DL | 95 | Lawtez Rogers | Fr |
| DL | 96 | Brett Kulka | Sr |
| DL | 97 | Celso Rivera | Sr |
| DL | 98 | Brandon Gaddy | Fr |
| DL | 99 | Breyon Gaddy | Fr |

Special teams

| Pos. | # | Name | Class |
|---|---|---|---|
| K | 27 | Joseph Petrino | Fr |
| K, P | 32 | Matt Barber | Sr |
| LS | 36 | Matt Oliveira | Sr |
| K | 38 | Paul Inzerillo | So |
| K | 41 | Mike Shinsky | Jr |
| LS | 47 | James Rosenberry | Fr |
| P | 88 | Wade Lees | Jr |
| K, P | 97 | Bentley Faulkner | Fr |

Head coach

- D. J. Durkin

Coordinators/assistant coaches

- Andy Buh (defensive coordinator)
- Matt Canada (offensive coordinator / quarterbacks)
- Chris Beatty (Associate head coach / wide receivers)
- Jimmy Brumbaugh (co-defensive coordinator / Defensive Line)
- Dave Bucar (tight ends)
- Bryan Stinespring (offensive line)
- Aazaar Abdul-Rahim (cornerbacks)
- Chuck Heater (safeties)
- Matt Barnes (Linebackers / special teams coordinator)
- Jafar Williams (running backs)
- Alex Garwig (graduate assistant)
- Desmond Morgan (graduate assistant)

Legend

- (C) Team captain
- (S) Suspended
- (I) Ineligible
- Injured
- Redshirt

Roster
Last update: September 15, 2018

== Awards and honors ==
All-Big Ten
| Player | Position | Coaches | Media |
|---|---|---|---|
| Tre Watson | LB | 2 | 1 |
| Darnell Savage | DB | 2 | 2 |
| Anthony McFarland Jr. | RB | 3 | 2 |
| Antoine Brooks | DB | 2 | HM |
| Damian Prince | OT | – | 3 |
| Brendan Moore | C | HM | HM |
| Derwin Gray | OT | HM | HM |
| Byron Cowart | DL | HM | HM |
| Tino Ellis | DB | HM | HM |
| Wade Lees | P | HM | HM |
| Ty Johnson | KR | HM | HM |
| Joseph Petrino | K | HM | HM |
HM = Honorable mention. Reference:

== 2019 NFL draft ==
| Round | Pick | Player | Position | NFL Club |
|---|---|---|---|---|
| 1 | 21 | Darnell Savage | S | Green Bay Packers |
| 5 | 159 | Byron Cowart | DE | New England Patriots |
| 6 | 186 | Ty Johnson | RB | Detroit Lions |
| 7 | 219 | Derwin Gray | OG | Pittsburgh Steelers |
| UDFA | | Jesse Aniebonam | DE | Houston Texans |
| UDFA | | RaVon Davis | DB | Pittsburgh Steelers |
| UDFA | | Taivon Jacobs | WR | Baltimore Ravens |
| UDFA | | Brendan Moore | OL | San Francisco 49ers |
| UDFA | | Damian Prince | OG | Indianapolis Colts |
| UDFA | | Tre Watson | LB | Miami Dolphins |

== Notes ==
1.First name spelled as "Brendon" in the reference and as "Brendan" in the team roster.
