= Durcan =

Durcan, together with Durkan and Durkin, is an anglicised form of the Irish surnames Ó Duarcáin or Mac Duarcáin. Notable people who spell the surname Durcan include:

- James Durcan (born 1994), Gaelic footballer
- Liam Durcan, Canadian neurologist
- Mark Durcan (born 1961), American CEO
- Paddy Durcan (born 1994), Gaelic footballer
- Patrick Durcan (politician) (born 1951), Irish judge and politician
- Patrick Durcan (bishop) (1790–1875), Irish Roman Catholic clergyman
- Paul Durcan (1944–2025), Irish poet
- Paul Durcan (Gaelic footballer) (born 1984), Irish Gaelic footballer and coach
- Peter Durcan (born 1986), Irish rugby union player
- Ted Durcan (born 1973), Irish jockey
- Thomas Durcan (1920–1998), Singaporean sailor

== See also ==
- Dorkin, another variation of the surname Durkin
