= Dworkin =

Dworkin may refer to:

- Andrea Dworkin, American feminist writer and activist
- Dworkin (surname)
- Dworkin Barimen, fictional character from The Chronicles of Amber
- Dworkin's Game Driver, LPMud server

== See also ==
- Dorkin
