= John Durkin =

John Durkin may refer to:

- John A. Durkin (1936–2012), U.S. senator
- John Durkin (footballer) (1930–1983), Scottish association football player
