= John Adams Project =

The John Adams Project was established by the American Civil Liberties Union and the National Association of Criminal Defense Lawyers to "support military counsel at Guantanamo Bay." The United States government has detained hundreds of men at the Guantanamo Bay detention camp following the September 11 attacks and the war in Afghanistan.

On November 13, 2009, with the U.S. Justice Department's announcement that the cases for five high value detainees will be transferred to federal court, the ACLU announced that the John Adams Project will be formally discontinued.

== CIA photos controversy ==
In August 2009 claims were made that three military lawyers associated with the project had shown pictures of Central Intelligence Agency (CIA) officers to their clients, Guantanamo captives. The captives were among the "high value detainee" program who had spent years in secret CIA interrogation centers.

The photos were taken of the CIA officers when they were in public.

Joshua Dratel, one of the officers of the Project, defended the actions of the attorneys saying "If you get information in the public record, it doesn't become classified just because the government feels it is embarrassing or that they would prefer you not to show it to anyone. There is no prohibition on gathering public-source information and showing it to your client."
