= Tom Durkin =

Tom Durkin may refer to:

- Tom Durkin (sportscaster) (born 1950), American sportscaster and public address announcer
- Tom Durkin (artist) (1853–1902), Australian caricaturist and cartoonist
- Tom Durkin (soccer), American soccer coach

== See also ==
- Thomas Durkin (disambiguation)
