= Thomas Anthony Durkin =

American defense attorney (1946–2025)

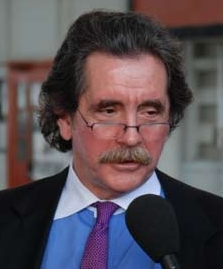
- Durkin speaking in the Guantanamo Bay Naval Base in 2008
- Born: September 3, 1946; Chicago, Illinois, U.S.
- Died: July 21, 2025 (aged 78); Chicago, Illinois, U.S.
- Education: University of Notre Dame (BA); University of San Francisco School of Law (JD)
- Occupation: Criminal defense attorney
- Spouse: Janis D. Roberts (m. 1987)
- Children: 6

Thomas Anthony Durkin (September 3, 1946 – July 21, 2025) was an American criminal defense attorney based in Chicago. He specialized in civil rights and domestic terrorism cases. Durkin's pro bono efforts to defend several Guantanamo Bay detainees attracted national attention. He was also a law professor and Distinguished Practitioner in Residence at Loyola University Chicago School of Law.

== Early life ==
Durkin was born on September 3, 1946, on the South Side of Chicago, and graduated from Leo Catholic High School in 1964. He received a Bachelor of Arts degree from the University of Notre Dame in 1968. He attended the University of San Francisco School of Law from 1970 to 1973, and received the degree of Juris Doctor in June 1973.

== Legal career ==
From April 1978 to March 1984, he served as an Assistant United States Attorney for the Northern District of Illinois under United States Attorneys Thomas P. Sullivan and Dan K. Webb. Beginning in September 2010, he was a Graduate Student at Large and a Returning Scholar at the University of Chicago.

Durkin was admitted by the U.S. Department of Defense to The Pool of Qualified Civilian Defense Counsel to Practice Before the Military Commissions, and at the time of his death was serving on the National Association of Criminal Defense Lawyer's Select Committee on National Security. He also served as a member of the Advisory Committee of the Center for Civil and Human Rights of the University of Notre Dame Law School. Durkin served until his death as a panel attorney for the Federal Defender Program, Inc., for the United States District Court for the Northern District of Illinois in Chicago; and was a member of the National Association of Criminal Defense Lawyers, the American Bar Association's Committees on Criminal Justice and International Law, the Illinois State Bar Association's Human Rights Section Council and the Union League Club of Chicago's Public Affairs Subcommittee on the Administration of Justice. Durkin was a fellow of the American College of Trial Lawyers. He also taught National Security Law, and was the Distinguished Practitioner in Residence at Loyola University Chicago School of Law, where he served as Co-Founder and Co-Director of its National Security and Civil Rights Program.

He was notable for representing detainees at Guantanamo Bay. He would appear in national interviews where he would advocate on behalf of the families of detainees at Guantanamo. Durkin was selected in 2008 to be a participant in the John Adams Project, a joint effort of the American Civil Liberties Union and the National Association of Criminal Defense Lawyers to provide civilian defense counsel to assist the military lawyers in the trial of the five High Value Detainees charged in U.S. v. Khalid Sheikh Mohammed, et al., in the Military Commissions at Guantanamo Bay, Cuba with conspiring to orchestrate the September 11 attacks of the World Trade Center and Pentagon. Durkin was civilian counsel for defendant Ramzi bin Alshibh.

In 2009, Durkin represented Bobby DeLaughter, the former Hinds County, Mississippi, Circuit Judge in a mail fraud case pertaining to alleged judicial misconduct. In May 2008, Durkin obtained an acquittal on all counts for Michael J. Mahoney, the former Executive Director of the John Howard Association, on charges of bribery involving health care contracts with the Illinois Department of Corrections.

Durkin was the lead trial counsel for Matthew F. Hale, the self-proclaimed Pontifex Maximus of the World Church of the Creator, an avowed white supremacist organization, on widely publicized domestic terrorism charges that Hale solicited the murder of U.S. District Court Judge Joan Lefkow. He also served as co-counsel for the Global Relief Foundation, Inc., of Bridgeview, Illinois, one of the Islamic charities whose assets were blocked after September 11, 2001, under provisions of the U.S. PATRIOT Act by the Treasury Department's Office of Foreign Assets Control.

In January 2014, Durkin represented Jared Chase, one of the NATO 3 defendants, in the first prosecution under Illinois' terrorism statute, wherein the three defendants were acquitted on all terrorism charges. In 2012, Durkin represented a group of University of Chicago graduate students arrested following the mass arrests of the Occupy Chicago protesters in Grant Park, Chicago. In 2017, he was one of the lawyers who made it possible for a Syrian resident doctor at a Chicago hospital to return to Chicago after being refused re-entry to the United States following his wedding as a result of E.O. 59447v.8.

== Personal life and death ==
In 1987, Durkin married his law partner, Janis D. Roberts. They opened their firm, Durkin & Roberts, in 1984. The couple had six children and lived in Chicago.

Durkin died at Northwestern Memorial Hospital in Chicago on July 21, 2025, at the age of 78, weeks after being diagnosed with metastatic lung cancer.
