= Matt Canada =

American football coach (born 1972)

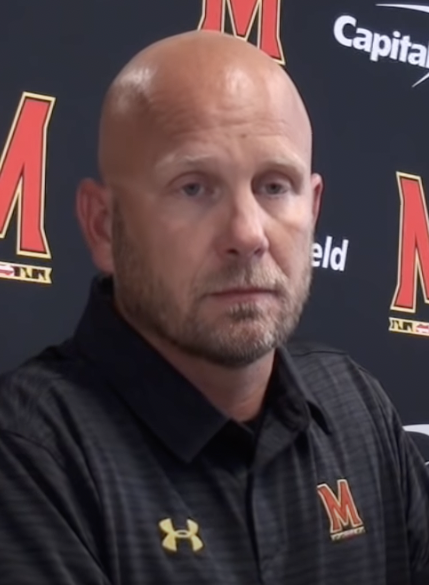
- Canada in 2019

Personal information
- Born: January 19, 1972 (age 54); New Palestine, Indiana, U.S.

Career information
- High school: New Palestine
- College: Indiana

Career history
- Indiana (1994–1996) Graduate assistant; Butler (1997) Offensive coordinator & quarterbacks coach; Northern Illinois (1998–2000) Running backs coach; Northern Illinois (2001–2002) Quarterbacks coach; Northern Illinois (2003) Offensive coordinator & quarterbacks coach; Indiana (2004) Quarterbacks coach; Indiana (2005–2006) Passing game coordinator & quarterbacks coach; Indiana (2007–2010) Offensive coordinator & quarterbacks coach; Northern Illinois (2011) Offensive coordinator & quarterbacks coach; Wisconsin (2012) Offensive coordinator & quarterbacks coach; NC State (2013–2015) Offensive coordinator & quarterbacks coach; Pittsburgh (2016) Offensive coordinator & quarterbacks coach; LSU (2017) Offensive coordinator & quarterbacks coach; Maryland (2018) Offensive coordinator & quarterbacks coach; Maryland (2018) Interim head coach; Pittsburgh Steelers (2020) Quarterbacks coach; Pittsburgh Steelers (2021–2023) Offensive coordinator

Head coaching record
- Career: NCAA: 5–7 (.417)
- Coaching profile at Pro Football Reference

Matthew Canada (born January 19, 1972) is an American football coach who most recently served as the offensive coordinator for the Pittsburgh Steelers of the National Football League (NFL). He previously was the offensive coordinator and quarterbacks coach for Maryland, LSU, Pittsburgh, NC State, Wisconsin, Northern Illinois, Butler, and Indiana.

== Early life and education ==
Canada attended New Palestine High School in New Palestine, Indiana. He spent two years as the starting quarterback, throwing for 1,736 yards while leading his team to a 20–3 record. Canada then attended Indiana University Bloomington where he became a student assistant for the football program during his sophomore year.

== Coaching career ==
=== Early career ===
Canada's coaching career includes early stints at Indiana, Butler, Northern Illinois and Wisconsin. In 2011, Canada served an integral role in leading Northern Illinois to the MAC championship, and in 2012, he helped lead Wisconsin to the 2012 Big Ten Championship Game.

=== NC State ===
In 2013, Canada became offensive coordinator at NC State working under head coach Dave Doeren. Canada had previously worked under Doeren at Northern Illinois in 2011. After the 2014 season, Canada agreed to a new 3-year contract with NC State shortly after interviewing for the offensive coordinator job at Tennessee. He was subsequently let go by NC State following the 2015 season.

=== Pitt ===
In 2016, Canada was hired as offensive coordinator at Pitt. For his work during the 2016 season, he was named one of five finalists for the Broyles Award, given annually to the top assistant coach in college football.

=== LSU ===
On December 14, 2016, Canada was hired to become the offensive coordinator and quarterbacks coach at LSU. He held those positions for the 2017 season and on January 5, 2018, LSU and Canada mutually agreed to part ways.

=== Maryland ===
On January 22, 2018, Canada agreed to become the offensive coordinator at the University of Maryland.

On August 11, 2018, Canada became interim head coach for the Maryland Terrapins after D.J. Durkin was put on administrative leave following the death of Jordan McNair, an offensive lineman for the Maryland Terrapins. On November 17, 2018, Maryland came close to knocking off #3 ranked Ohio State, narrowly losing 52–51 in overtime. Maryland finished the season 5–7, failing to qualify for a bowl game. After Mike Locksley was hired as the permanent head coach at Maryland going forward, Canada was relieved of the day-to-day head coaching responsibilities. Canada was then replaced by Scottie Montgomery as offensive coordinator.

=== Pittsburgh Steelers ===
On January 15, 2020, Canada was hired by the Pittsburgh Steelers as their quarterbacks coach. On January 25, 2021, Canada was promoted to offensive coordinator of the Steelers, replacing Randy Fichtner. During his tenure with the Steelers, Canada was the source of scrutiny, largely due to his playcalling, as the Steelers offense was ranked near the bottom of the league. On November 21, 2023, Canada was fired by the Steelers; this was the first time since 1941 that the Steelers had made a mid-season coaching change.

== Personal life ==
Canada earned his bachelor's in Business and master's degree in Sports Administration at Indiana University. He is married to Erin Canada.

== Head coaching record ==
=== College ===
Year	Team	Overall	Conference	Standing	Bowl/playoffs
Maryland Terrapins (Big Ten Conference) (2018)
2018	Maryland	5–7	3–6	5th (East)	
Maryland:		5–7	3–6		
Total:		5–7			
