= Dork Sahagian =

Dork Sahagian is an Armenian American climate scientist. He is the Director of the Environmental Initiative at Lehigh University in Bethlehem, Pennsylvania. He invented a technique for calculating the Earth's air pressure in the past, based on the difference in the size of the bubbles in cooled volcanic lava. He received Nobel Peace Prize in 2007 as a part of IPCC.
