= Peter Durcan =

Irish rugby union player

- Born: Peter Durcan; 27 July 1986 (age 40) Sligo, Ireland
- Height: 1.83 m (6 ft 0 in)
- Weight: 86 kg (13 st 8 lb)
- School: Cistercian College
- University: NUI Galway

Rugby union career
- Position: Fly-half
Amateur team(s)
Years	Team	Apps	(Points)
- Ballina
–	Galwegians		
Senior career
Years	Team	Apps	(Points)
2006–2008	Connacht	10	(7)
2008–2009	La Rochelle	11	(27)
2009–2011	Limoges	44	(506)
2011–2013	Montauban	41	(230)
2013–2016	Limoges	50	(57)
International career
Years	Team	Apps	(Points)
2006	Ireland U21	6	(0)

Peter Durcan (born 27 July 1986) is an Irish rugby union player, whose position is usually Flyhalf although he has played at Centre/ Fullback and on the Wing. Originally from Ballina in County Mayo, Ireland, Durcan was born in neighbouring Sligo, Ireland.

== Career ==
In his professional career he formerly played for Connacht Rugby which he joined as part of the Academy before earning a development contract. Opportunities were fairly limited during his career with Connacht as he only made eight appearances in his two years with the club. He was released after season 2007–08.

He joined former Connacht colleague David McGowan at La Rochelle in the French Rugby Pro D2 for season 2008–09. In June 2009 he was released from his contract with La Rochelle.

In 2009 Peter joined Federale 1 side Limoges where he played for two seasons 2009–2011, before he joined another Fed 1 side Montauban for the 2011–12 season. After the 2012–13 season with Montauban, Durcan rejoined Limoges.
