= Howard Dvorkin =

American writer and philanthropist

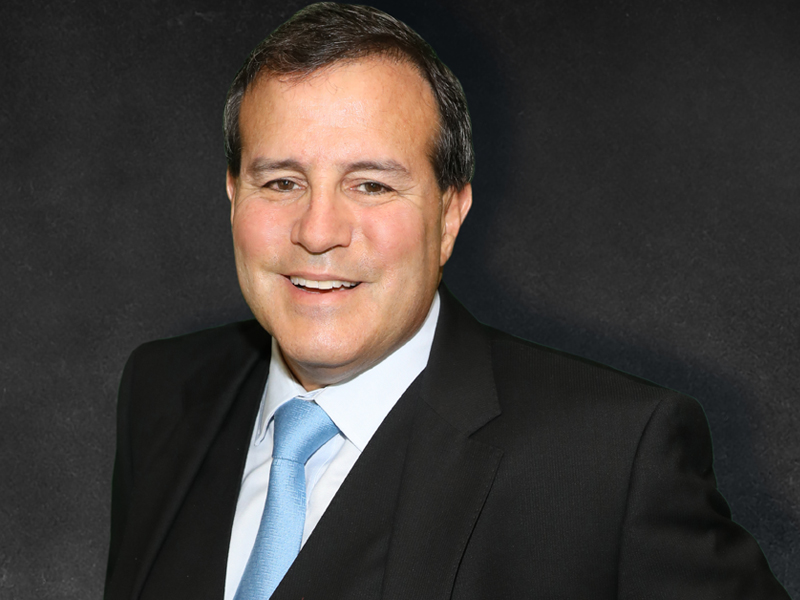
- Howard S. Dvorkin in 2020
- Born: April 7, 1965 (age 61); Toms River, New Jersey, U.S.
- Education: American University, University of Miami
- Occupations: Chairman of debt.com, author
- Website: howarddvorkin.com

Howard Dvorkin (born April 7, 1965) is a CPA, author, national columnist, philanthropist, and founder of the nation's largest credit counseling agency. The chairman of Debt.com, he has advocated a cash-only lifestyle without credit cards.

== Career ==
Dvorkin founded Consolidated Credit in 1993 in Fort Lauderdale, Florida. It earned an A-plus rating from the Better Business Bureau and eventually grew to be one to the largest counseling and consolidation firms.

After watching the organization and clients struggle with credit card debt, Dvorkin concluded, "Learning to live without a credit card is an integral part of financial empowerment....It’s about cash and discipline. Those who don’t use credit cards take money much more seriously than credit card users. The act of physically handing over the dollars and cents to a cashier or waitress generates a feeling of loss."

In reaction to U.S. consumers' increasing credit card debt and lack of financial education, Dvorkin announced in 2013 that he was stepping down as Consolidated Credit's spokesperson to launch Debt.com, an educational and news site covering consumer debt with the goal to "build an Angie’s List or a Better Business Bureau solely focused on debt, debt relief products, for all types of debt relief." In 2014, Dvorkin was named to the Junior Achievement Business Hall of Fame.

=== Authorship ===
Dvorkin has written two books: Credit Hell (Wiley, 2005) and Power Up (Wiley, 2013). He is a regular personal finance contributor to Entrepreneur and Fox Business, and he has been quoted as a financial expert by The New York Times, NBC News, CNN, Bankrate, and other national media outlets.

== Philanthropy ==
Dvorkin is the founder of Parkland Cares, which funded $1 million to provide immediate and long-term funding and awareness for mental health counseling for the Marjory Stoneman Douglas High School shooting survivors, their families and the community-at-large. Parkland Cares has since broadened its mission to serve the greater South Florida area helping to fund nonprofit mental health and trauma counseling agencies. He was formerly on the executive board of the United Way of Broward County and the former chairman elect for the board of directors of the Better Business Bureau of Southeast Florida. He was a founding member of the South Florida American Heart Association board of directors as well as on the board of governors of The H. Wayne Huizenga School of Business and Entrepreneurship at Nova Southeastern University.
