= Cora Dvorkin =

Argentine physicist

Professor Cora Dvorkin
- Education: University of Chicago (PhD); University of Buenos Aires (BSc)
- Scientific career
- Fields: Theoretical cosmology
- Workplaces: Harvard University; Institute for Advanced Study (IAS)
- Thesis: On the imprints of inflation in the Cosmic Microwave Background. (2011)
- Doctoral advisor: Prof. Wayne Hu
- Website: www.physics.harvard.edu/people/facpages/dvorkin http://dvorkin.physics.harvard.edu/Home.html

Cora Dvorkin is an Argentine physicist, who is a full Professor at the Physics Department at Harvard University. Dvorkin is a theoretical cosmologist. Her areas of research are: the nature of dark matter, neutrinos and other light relics, and the physics of the early universe. Dvorkin is the Harvard Representative at the newly NSF-funded Institute for Artificial Intelligence and Fundamental Interactions (IAIFI)'s Board. In 2022, she was voted "favorite professor" by the Harvard senior Class of 2023. She has been awarded the 2019 DOE Early Career award and has been named the "2018 Scientist of the year" by the Harvard Foundation for "Salient Contributions to Physics, Cosmology and STEM Education". She has also been awarded a Radcliffe Institute Fellowship and a Shutzer Professorship at the Radcliffe Institute. In 2018 she was awarded a Star Family Challenge prize for Promising Scientific Research, which supports high-risk, high-impact scientific research at Harvard. In 2020, Dvorkin gave a talk on machine learning applied to the search for dark matter as part of the TEDx Río de la Plata event.

== Early life and education ==
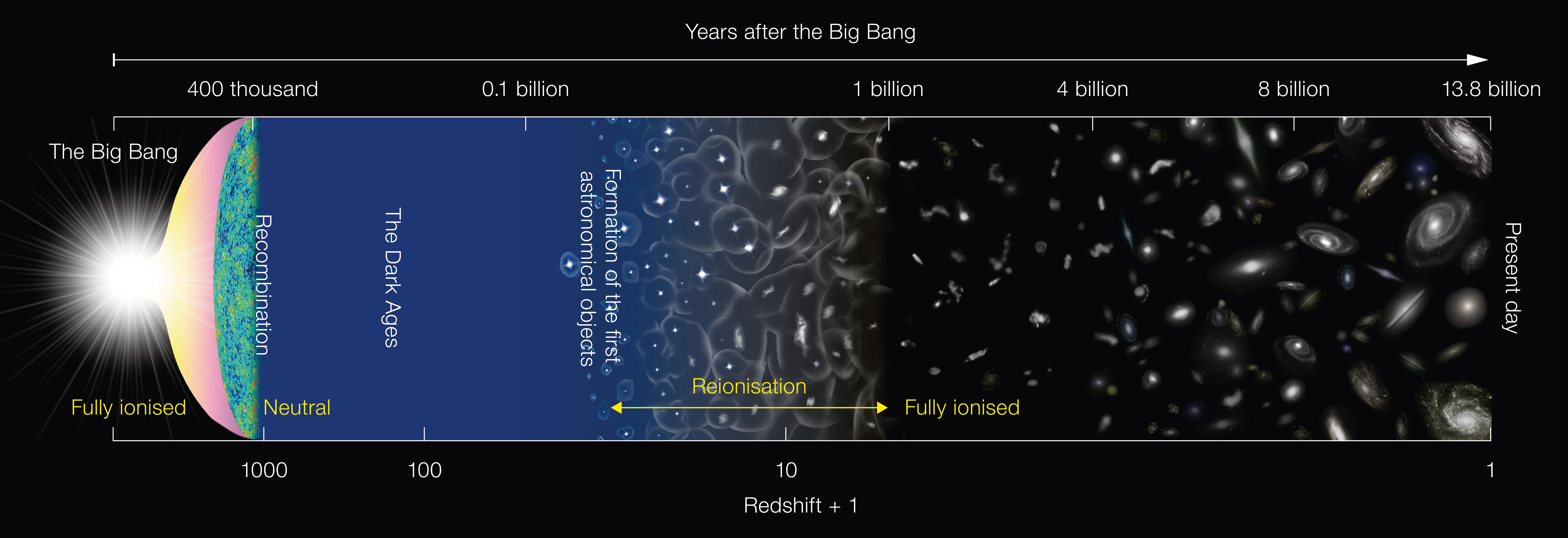

Dvorkin was born and raised in Buenos Aires, Argentina. She received her diploma in Physics at the University of Buenos Aires. She moved to the University of Chicago for her graduate studies, where she earned her Ph.D. in the department of physics in 2011 and where she won the "Sydney Bloomenthal Fellowship" for "outstanding performance in her research". She has conducted postdoctoral research at the School of Natural Sciences at the Institute for Advanced Study in Princeton (2011-2014) and at the Institute for Theory and Computation (ITC) at the Center for Astrophysics | Harvard & Smithsonian (2014-2015), where she was both a Hubble Fellow and an ITC fellow.

== Research and career ==
Dvorkin joined the faculty at Harvard University in fall 2015. She makes use of Cosmic microwave background observations, gravitational lensing and the Large-scale structure of the Universe of the universe to better understand the nature of the dark sector and the physics of the early universe. She has pushed the frontiers of sub-GeV dark matter using CMB and large-scale structure data. She has been involved in leading the science goals for the DOE-funded next-generation CMB experiment ("CMB-S4"), for which these scenarios are being proposed as the main driver of the dark matter science case. She has developed with her research group a novel formalism aimed at probing dark matter at small scales using gravitational lensing, by means of statistical measurements of dark matter substructure. She has also pioneered the use of machine learning techniques to find dark matter subhalos in lensing systems.

Dvorkin has pioneered a model-independent method for probing the shape of the inflationary potential. She has also constructed new theoretical templates for higher-order correlation functions of the initial curvature perturbations that could shed light on the physical properties of particles with non-zero spin during inflation as well as possible phase transitions during the early universe. She developed statistical tools to look for these correlation functions in the Cosmic Microwave Background and the large-scale structure data measured by current and future surveys. In 2014-2015, she joined the joint analysis between BICEP2, the Keck array, and Planck collaboration. She worked on the likelihood analysis of a multi-component model that included Galactic foregrounds and a possible contribution from inflationary gravity waves. No statistically significant evidence for primordial gravitational waves and a strong evidence for galactic dust were reported in this work.

Dvorkin is also extremely dedicated to supporting underrepresented minorities and women in science.

== Awards and honors ==
- 2022 Voted "favorite professor" at Harvard University by the Harvard senior Class of 2023
- 2019 United States Department of Energy Early Career Award
- 2018 Harvard Scientist of the Year, awarded by the Harvard Foundation
- 2018 Radcliffe Institute Fellowship and a Shutzer Professorship
- 2018 Star Family Challenge prize recipient for Promising Scientific Research, seed funding for high-risk and high-impact research projects at Harvard University.
- 2014 Kavli Frontiers of Science Fellowship, awarded by the US National Academy of Sciences and the Kavli Foundation
- 2014-2017 Hubble Fellowship, awarded by NASA
- 2014-2017 ITC Fellowship, awarded by Harvard University
- 2012 Martin and Beate Block Award, awarded to the best young physicist by the Aspen Center for Physics
- 2009 "Sidney Bloomenthal Fellowship", awarded for "outstanding performance in research", by the University of Chicago, Department of Physics
