= Dorking (disambiguation) =

Dorking is a market town in Surrey, England.

Dorking may also refer to:

== Places ==
- Dorking (UK Parliament constituency), a former parliamentary constituency centred on the town of Dorking, Surrey
  - Dorking railway station, one of three stations that serve the town of Dorking in Surrey, England
- Dorking, Ontario, Canada, a community
- Dorking Tye, Suffolk, England

== Sport ==
- Dorking F.C., a football club based in Dorking, Surrey
- Dorking R.F.C., a rugby union football club originally based in Dorking, Surrey

== Other uses ==
- Dorking chicken, a breed of chicken
- Google dorking, the use of advanced search parameters on Google
- HMS Dorking (1918), a Hunt-class minesweeper
- The Battle of Dorking: Reminiscences of a Volunteer (1871), a novella by George Tomkyns Chesney
- Portmanteau of door-knocking, a political campaign activity

== See also ==
- Dorkin
