= David Dworkin =

American conductor, clarinetist, and educator (born 1934)

David Dworkin (born 1934) is an American conductor, clarinetist, and educator.

Much of his career focused on work with young people:

- Conductor of the University of Vermont Summer Music Session for 15 years
- Music Director of the Vermont Youth Orchestra
- Conductor and clarinet teacher of Pre-College Division Orchestra of the Manhattan School of Music, 10 years
- Conductor of the Philharmonic on the Hudson 15 years

He has also conducted the New Jersey, Vermont, and Manhattan Symphony Orchestras.

He was Conductor and Artistic Consultant to the PBS Television series, Grow Old With Me series, and conducted Kurt Weill's Threepenny Opera on CBS Television.

He performed with of the American Symphony Orchestra under Leopold Stokowski and with the orchestra of the Metropolitan Opera, and as a soloist in concerts around the world.

He graduated Juilliard School, where he studied clarinet with Daniel Bonade and Robert McGinnis, and conducting with Jean Morel and earned graduate degrees from Columbia University.

He now promotes his music-based exercise program Conductorcise, which combines an aerobics workout with basic conducting and listening skills. The program is popular with senior citizens in the United States. A recent collaboration with Chamber Music Charleston brought the program to a new level with the addition of live classical music
