= John Durkin (footballer) =

Scottish footballer (1930–1983)

Personal information
- Full name: John Durkin
- Date of birth: 18 April 1930
- Place of birth: Hill of Beath, Scotland
- Date of death: 3 July 1983 (aged 53)
- Place of death: Ottawa, Canada
- Position: Inside forward

Senior career*
Years	Team	Apps	(Gls)
1951–1952	Heart of Midlothian	9	(0)
1952–1953	Dunfermline Athletic	12	(2)
1953–1955	Gillingham	30	(5)
- Ramsgate Athletic
- * Club domestic league appearances and goals

John Durkin (18 April 1930 – 3 July 1983) was a Scottish footballer who had a career in the 1950s. He began his senior career in his native Scotland with Heart of Midlothian, but never gained a regular place in the team. He later played for English club Gillingham, where he made 30 appearances in The Football League.

== Career ==
Born in Hill of Beath, Fife Durkin joined Edinburgh-based club Heart of Midlothian from local club Hill of Beath Ramblers in 1948, but did not make his Scottish Football League debut until 1951. He remained at Tynecastle Stadium until 1952, but played only sporadically, and joined Dunfermline Athletic in December of that year. In August 1953, he joined Gillingham of the Football League Third Division South. He signed for his new club on 21 August and made his Football League debut the following day in a match against Reading, during which he scored two goals in a 3–0 victory. He missed only one first team match between his debut and the following January, but then missed the remainder of the 1953–54 season. The following season, he could not gain a place in the team, managing only three appearances when key players were injured, although on his first appearance for ten months he scored a goal in a 3–1 victory over Newport County. He left at the end of the 1954–55 season to join non-league club Ramsgate Athletic of the Kent League in May 1955. No further details of his career are known.

== Outside football ==
Durkin was a chemistry student when he signed for Gillingham. He went on to combine playing for the club with a job at an East Kent coal mine. Durkin died in Ottawa, Canada on 3 July 1983, at the age of 53.
