= Jordan McNair =

American football player (1999–2018)

Profile
- Position: Offensive lineman

Personal information
- Born: March 3, 1999; Baltimore, Maryland, US
- Died: June 13, 2018 (aged 19); Baltimore, Maryland, US
- Listed height: 6 ft 4 in (1.93 m)
- Listed weight: 325 lb (147 kg)

Career information
- High school: McDonogh School (Owings Mills, Maryland)
- College: Maryland (2017)

Jordan Martin McNair (March 3, 1999 – June 13, 2018) was an American football player from Randallstown, Maryland, who played on the offensive line. In May 2018, following an offseason workout with the Maryland Terrapins football team, McNair was hospitalized with heat stroke; despite an emergency liver transplant, McNair died fifteen days later on June 13, 2018. Following the ensuing investigation of the culture of the University of Maryland football program, head coach D. J. Durkin was fired on October 31.

== Early life and playing career ==
McNair was the son of Marty McNair and Tonya Wilson. He was touted as a four-star recruit, ranked in the top 25 nationally for offensive linemen, according to ESPN and Scout. During his high school career, when he played offensive tackle for McDonogh School in Owings Mills, McNair was named to the American Family Insurance All-USA Maryland Football Team (2016) and the Baltimore Sun All-Metro first team (2015, 2016). McNair was also considering attending Ohio State, Penn State, or Rutgers, and had been extended offers from Alabama, Auburn, Boston College, and Duke, but chose to attend the University of Maryland. He played in one game for the Maryland Terrapins as a true freshman in 2017.

== Death ==
On May 29, 2018, McNair collapsed during a strenuous afternoon practice. He was hospitalized that evening after visibly showing signs of extreme exhaustion with a body temperature of 106 °F (41 °C) recorded upon arrival. He was airlifted later that night to the R Adams Cowley Shock Trauma Center to receive an emergency liver transplant, where he died on June 13. Though no cause of death was initially listed for McNair, on July 16 his parents stated that he died from heat stroke. This was corroborated by a report published by ESPN in August, with teammates and medical staff noticing that McNair suffered an apparent seizure at approximately 5 pm, one hour before a 911 call was placed. University officials dispute the time of the seizure.

An investigation started immediately after his death showed that McNair first complained of cramps, an early sign of heat illness, at 4:59 pm but did not arrive at the hospital for treatment until 6:36 pm and that trainers failed to recognize the signs of heat illness, nor did they take aggressive measures to cool him. A second investigation, this one covering the culture of the Maryland football program, was started after ESPN published an investigative article on August 10, 2018. Initially, one coach and two trainers were suspended after the ESPN article, including Rick Court, the strength and conditioning coach named as the primary source of abuse. Court resigned almost immediately after being suspended. Head coach D.J. Durkin was suspended one day later; after the second investigation concluded that Maryland football did not have, by definition, a toxic culture, Durkin was reinstated on October 30. Following intense uproar and protest over his return, Durkin was fired the next day by University President Wallace Loh.

=== Walters Report ===
An independent report was commissioned from Walters Inc., a South Carolina-based sports medicine consulting firm, in June 2018 following the death of McNair, and the report was released on September 21. During the investigation, the board of regents of the University System of Maryland assumed control from the campus. The Walters report found that trainers failed to identify the symptoms of exertional heat illness, did not take sufficiently aggressive measures to treat McNair's elevated core temperature, and the University's catastrophic incident guideline was not followed. When questioned for the development of the Walters report, the head trainer stated he was afraid McNair could have drowned if they had attempted immersing him in cold water to lower his body temperature.

Starting at 4:41 pm, McNair ran the first of 10 timed 110 yd (100 m) runs; athletes in his group were allotted 19 seconds to complete each run, and McNair successfully completed seven repetitions. By the eighth repetition, McNair was visibly laboring to complete the training and by 4:59 PM, trainers began to assist McNair, who had described symptoms of cramping. A witness recalled a coach forcing McNair to finish the sequence of sprints despite struggling mightily, telling his teammates to "drag his ass across the field".

McNair was taken from the field at 5:22 pm for further treatment, including cooling with cold towels, until he exhibited a mental status change at 5:50 pm. Trainers then called the team physician at 5:52 pm and, at the physician's direction, followed up with an emergency call to 9-1-1 at 5:55 pm. At approximately the same time, McNair experienced a seizure. The 9-1-1 records indicate the first call was recorded at approximately 5:57 pm and the caller only stated that McNair was "hyperventilating" and "unable to control his breathing" without mentioning a seizure. At 6:02 pm, the head trainer called campus security to report respiratory distress experienced during the seizure, to ensure that paramedics would be available.

The first ambulance arrived at 6:03 pm. No one had been sent to meet the first ambulance and direct it to the Gossett Football Team House, where McNair was being treated. In addition, in Prince George's County, first responder ambulances do not carry paramedics, so a second ambulance was dispatched with paramedics at approximately 6:07 pm. The second ambulance arrived at 6:11 pm and, after an intravenous line was secured, departed at 6:27 pm; McNair was transported to Washington Adventist Hospital, arriving at 6:36 pm.

At the hospital, McNair's body temperature cooled to 102 °F (39 °C) after 12 minutes of immersion in ice and water, but medical experts commenting after his death believed that cooling occurred too late. Doctors at Washington Adventist noted "patient improving" by 8:32 PM before he was airlifted to R Adams Cowley.

== Resulting investigation of Maryland football program ==
=== Toxic culture reported ===
After McNair's death, ESPN questioned current and former players for Maryland football as well as people close to the program, going on to publish an investigative report on August 10, 2018. In the report, ESPN found evidence of a toxic culture instilled by the coaching staff led by head coach D.J. Durkin and strength and conditioning coach Rick Court, who Durkin had once called his "most important hire" in an interview shortly after accepting the position of head coach in December 2015. Players interviewed in August 2016 after the first full offseason with Court agreed, and a comparison of Terrapin player weights between the Spring 2016 and Fall 2016 media guides showed notable differences. Players reported the intensity of voluntary workouts in June and July 2018 decreased after McNair's death was announced, but resumed normal intensity in August.

It's so important, I believe, that the strength coach and the head coach are directly in line with one another in terms of what's important, what's the message we're delivering, and Rick and I are. We're totally synchronized in that and so he's huge. He's critical to all we do.

— Maryland head coach D.J. Durkin, quoted in Carroll County Times article published on August 9, 2016

In general, the strength and conditioning coach has been named "perhaps the most important person on a school's coaching roster besides the head coach" because of NCAA rules that prohibit head and position coaches from holding offseason practices, but permit up to eight hours of strength and conditioning activities per week during those times. This in turn means the strength and conditioning coach essentially is responsible for the team during the offseason. Michael Baumann, a sportswriter for The Ringer, characterized Court's behavior as "bullying" and pointed out there are no protections afforded to college football players who were at the mercy of their coaches' authority: "[C]ollege football coaches are afforded broad power over their players. They frequently determine the class schedule and course of study for the players in their charge. They control how much an individual student-athlete plays, and under what circumstances. Those decisions could have million-dollar consequences on a player’s NFL career."

Many of the individuals interviewed described the coaches carrying out questionable behaviors such as:

- Belittling and humiliating certain players, including forcing an overweight player to eat candy bars while watching his teammates work out
- Fear and intimidation tactics such as excessive verbal abuse for players who fail to complete workouts, including one who passed out
- Extreme punishments such as forcing an injured lineman to compete in a tug of war competition by himself with one hand against all the defensive backs
- Endorsing unhealthy eating habits such as forcing underweight players to binge eat to gain weight

In the wake of these allegations, the University accepted responsibility for McNair's death and placed several athletic staffers, including Court, on administrative leave. President Loh and director of athletics Damon Evans met privately with McNair's parents in the morning of August 14 to apologize personally before making a public admission of responsibility and follow-up actions later that afternoon.

=== Culture investigation ===
The university also commissioned an independent panel to investigate the toxic culture allegations; the panel initially was made up of four members appointed by Loh: two retired judges, a former federal prosecutor, and an unfilled position for a former football coach and athletic administrator. After the board of regents took over responsibility for both investigations on August 17, it was modified to eight members: five were appointed by the board of regents, and the remaining three had been originally appointed to the four-member panel by Loh (Legg, Scheeler, and Williams).

The panel consisted of:

- Frederick M. Azar, M.D.
- Bonnie Lynn Bernstein
- Robert L. Ehrlich, Jr.
- Hon. Benson Everett Legg
- Hon. C. Thomas McMillen
- Charles P. Scheeler
- Hon. Alexander Williams Jr.
- Douglas Lee Williams

In a letter sent to parents of Maryland players before the ESPN report's publication, Durkin stated that he was aware of the investigation and that he is fully cooperating with it. Court resigned from his position on August 13, 2018, shortly after being suspended.

On August 11, 2018, Durkin was also placed on administrative leave and Matt Canada was named interim head coach until the culture investigation was completed. Punishments would be determined upon the investigation's conclusion. Members of the Champions Club, an athletic booster organization at Maryland, expressed their support for Durkin in a letter sent to the board of regents later in August. Members of the Champions Club stated there was no evidence of a toxic culture and that Durkin could be "welcomed back by the fans, by the players, by the donors with open arms." Champions Club member Rick Jaklitsch faulted McNair for improper hydration: "As much as we hate to say this, Jordan didn't do what Jordan was supposed to do. A trainer like Wes Robinson thinks a kid's properly hydrated and runs a drill set up for kids that are properly hydrated, and when the kid didn't drink the gallon [of water] he knew he had to drink, that's going to send the wrong signal to the person running the drill." When the football team traveled to play Michigan, Jaklitsch was removed from the team's flight after his remarks were made public.

The report leaked ahead of its public release; according to a copy obtained by the Associated Press in late October, it faulted the Athletics Department for not adequately supporting Durkin, blamed Court for unacceptably abusive behavior, and concluded that "Maryland's football culture was not toxic" by definition. Despite a claimed open door policy, players and assistants "feared retribution and dismissal of their concerns because of the closeness of Mr. Durkin and Mr. Court", and "players rarely felt comfortable sharing concerns with [Durkin]". The conclusion that the culture was "not toxic" was ridiculed by sports writers Claire McNear (for The Ringer), Tom Ley (for Deadspin), Richard Johnson (for SB Nation), and Jeff Seidel (for Forbes).

=== Consequences ===
The board of regents of the University System of Maryland, acting on the conclusions of the independent culture investigation, recommended the reinstatement of Coach Durkin on October 30, 2018, over the objections of university president Wallace Loh. Although Loh had recommended Durkin to be dismissed, the Board urged Loh to retain Durkin and Evans. Loh fired Durkin one day later, on October 31. The Board also recommended reinstating the two trainers who had been suspended in August. However, after Durkin's firing, those two trainers, Wes Robinson and Steve Nordwall, also were subsequently terminated on November 6.

President Loh announced his resignation, effective June 2019, on October 30, the same day he accepted the recommendations of the board. In response to Loh's resignation, many state lawmakers gave open support to his decisions against the board and expressed a desire to see him continue as president. The chair of the board of regents, James T. Brady, announced his immediate resignation on November 1, following the outcry that ensued after Durkin was reinstated. In a statement released on November 7, the new chair of the board, Linda R. Gooden, apologized "to the McNair family, the University of Maryland, College Park community, and to the citizens of our state" because the Board had "lost sight of its responsibility to the university system" and that "everyone on the board now understands that the board's personnel recommendations were wrong."

In January 2021, University of Maryland has agreed on a $3.5 million settlement with his parents, Marty McNair and Tonya Wilson.

== Legacy ==
McNair's family started the Jordan McNair Foundation in July 2018. On May 31, 2019, the Jordan McNair Foundation held the first annual Jordan McNair Golf Classic tournament at Turf Valley Resort in Howard County, Maryland. Events included an auction to raise funds for the Foundation, whose mission is to raise awareness of heat-related illnesses.

In August 2018, before the start of the 2018 season, the University of Maryland football team announced they have temporarily retired McNair's jersey number 79 until 2020. In addition, the Terrapins will wear No. 79 as a helmet patch, and will seal McNair's locker with glass through 2020. McDonogh School retired McNair's jersey number 70 in September.

On June 13, 2019, the one-year anniversary of McNair's death, the National Center for Children and Families arranged Jordan McNair Field Day at J.C. Nalle Elementary School in Washington, D.C. Dozens of Maryland football players attended the athletic event while wearing white t-shirts bearing McNair's jersey number 79. Later that day, the remainder of the team joined the Jordan McNair Foundation at a health and wellness clinic at McDonogh School.

== See also ==
- Korey Stringer
- List of American football players who died during their careers
