= National Association of Criminal Defense Lawyers =

American criminal defense organization

- Abbreviation: NACDL
- Formation: 1958
- Type: Professional group
- Legal status: Association
- Purpose: Provide a forum for important legal issues
- Headquarters: Washington, D.C.
- Region served: United States
- Members: 90 groups Approx. 9,000 individuals
- Official language: English
- President: Michael P. Heiskell
- Executive Director: Lisa M. Wayne
- Affiliations: American Bar Association
- Website: www.nacdl.org

The National Association of Criminal Defense Lawyers (NACDL) is an American criminal defense organization.

Members include private criminal defense lawyers, public defenders, active U.S. military defense counsel, law professors, judges, and defense counsel in international criminal tribunals, including the International Criminal Tribunal for the former Yugoslavia.

NACDL was founded in 1958 and is headquartered in Washington, D.C. The organization has nearly 9,000 direct members and 90 state, local, and international affiliate criminal defense lawyer organizations comprising about 40,000 members.

== Description ==
The organization has worked to build coalitions of legal organizations in order to provide a forum for important legal issues. Groups involved have included the American Bar Association, American Civil Liberties Union, the Constitution Project, the Federalist Society, The Heritage Foundation, and the Washington Legal Foundation.

NACDL often submits amicus curiae, or friend of the court, briefs in support of litigants at both the federal and state level in those cases that present issues of importance to criminal defendants, criminal defense lawyers, and/or the criminal justice system as a whole.

In 2012, NACDL launched The Criminal Docket podcast. It features a rundown of criminal justice news stories and interviews with "leaders in the legal practice, public policy, journalism, academia, and others whose lives intersect with the criminal justice system."

== Publications and reports ==
The Champion magazine is the official journal of NACDL and offers timely, informative articles written for and by criminal defense lawyers, featuring the latest developments in search and seizure laws, DUI/DWI, grand jury proceedings, habeas corpus, the exclusionary rule, death penalty, Racketeer Influenced and Corrupt Organizations Act (RICO), federal sentencing guidelines, forfeiture, white-collar crime, and other topics.

NACDL regularly issues news releases on a variety of topics of interest to its membership and the public. Topics include pertinent legislation and regulations, report releases, adopted resolutions, and U.S. Supreme Court case activity.

The Association also writes reports and white papers on critical issues facing the American criminal justice system. Some examples include Collateral Damage: America’s Failure to Forgive or Forget in the War on Crime – A Roadmap to Restore Rights and Status After Arrest and Conviction (2014) and Summary Injustice: A Look at Constitutional Deficiencies in South Carolina’s Summary Courts (2016).
