= Thomas Durkin (rugby league) =

English rugby league footballer

Personal information
- Full name: Thomas Durkin
- Born: 18 April 1895
- Died: March 1958 (aged 62); St. Helens, England

Playing information
- Position: Forward
Club
Years	Team	Pld	T	G	FG	P
1913–21	St. Helens	86	17	0	0	51
1921–22/23	Wakefield Trinity	40	6	0	0	18
	Total	126	23	0	0	69

Thomas Durkin (18 April 1895 – March 1958) was an English professional rugby league footballer who played in the 1910s and 1920s. He played at club level St. Helens and Wakefield Trinity, as a forward.

== Background ==
Thomas Durkin worked as a labourer at Pilkington's plate glassworks, and he died aged 62 in St. Helens, Lancashire, England.

== Playing career ==
=== Challenge Cup Final appearances ===
Thomas Durkin played as a forward in St. Helens' 3-37 defeat by Huddersfield in the 1915 Challenge Cup Final during the 1914–15 season at Watersheddings, Oldham on Saturday 1 May 1915, in front of a crowd of 8,000.

=== Notable tour matches ===
Thomas Durkin played as a forward in Wakefield Trinity's 3-29 defeat by Australia in the 1921–22 Kangaroo tour of Great Britain match during the 1921–22 season at Belle Vue, Wakefield on Saturday 22 October 1921.

=== Club career ===
Thomas Durkin made his dêbut for St. Helens in the 17-0 victory over Swinton at Knowsley Road, St. Helens on Saturday 25 January 1913, he played his last match for St. Helens in the 15-8 victory over Leigh at Knowsley Road, St. Helens on Friday 22 April 1921, he was transferred from St. Helens to Wakefield Trinity prior to the 1921–22 season, he made his dêbut for Wakefield Trinity during October 1921, and he played his last match for Wakefield Trinity during the 1922–23 season.
