= Dorkin =

Dorkin is a surname. Notable people with the surname include:

- Evan Dorkin (born 1965), American cartoonist
- Jack Dorkin (born 1866), professional footballer
- Viktor Dorkin (1953–2006), Russian politician

== See also ==
- Dorking, a town in England
  - Dorking (disambiguation)
- Durkin
- Dworkin (disambiguation); includes Dvorkin
