= D. J. Durkin =

American football coach (born 1978)

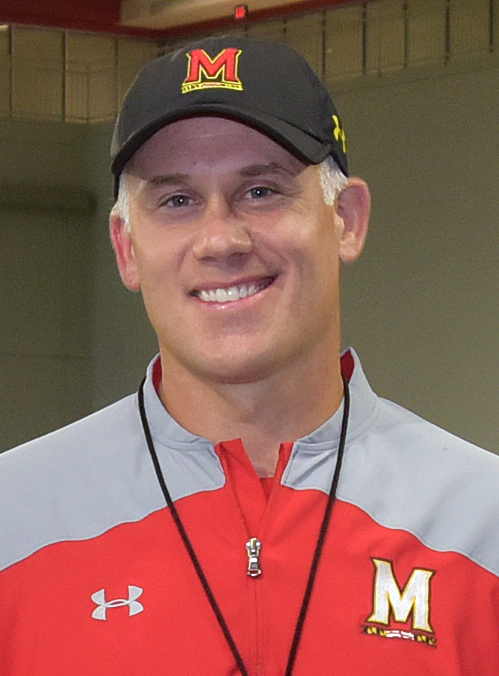
- Durkin in 2017

Current position
- Title: Defensive coordinator & Linebackers coach
- Team: Auburn
- Conference: SEC

Biographical details
- Born: January 15, 1978 (age 48); Boardman, Ohio, U.S.

Playing career
- 1997–2000: Bowling Green
- Positions: Defensive end, outside linebacker

Coaching career (HC unless noted)
- 2001–2002: Bowling Green (GA)
- 2003–2004: Notre Dame (GA)
- 2005: Bowling Green (DE)
- 2006: Bowling Green (LB/ST)
- 2007–2009: Stanford (DE/ST)
- 2010–2012: Florida (LB/ST)
- 2013–2014: Florida (DC/LB)
- 2014: Florida (interim HC)
- 2015: Michigan (DC/LB)
- 2016–2018: Maryland
- 2019: Atlanta Falcons (consultant)
- 2020–2021: Ole Miss (co-DC/LB)
- 2022–2023: Texas A&M (DC/LB)
- 2024–present: Auburn (DC/LB)
- 2025: Auburn (interim HC)
- 2026: Auburn (DC)

Head coaching record
- Overall: 12–17
- Bowls: 1–1

Daniel John Durkin (born January 15, 1978) is an American college football coach who is the defensive coordinator at Auburn. He was formerly the head coach for the University of Maryland. Durkin began serving as the head coach of the University of Maryland football team in 2015. Following the practice-related death of player Jordan McNair, Durkin was placed on leave in August 2018. Matt Canada was named acting head coach until further notice.

The University System of Maryland Board of Regents reinstated Durkin on October 30, 2018, instigating protests and uproar. University of Maryland president Wallace Loh fired Durkin the next day.

== Playing career ==
A native of Youngstown, Ohio, Durkin attended Boardman High School where he was an all-conference and all-Northeast Ohio selection.

Durkin played wide receiver and outside linebacker at Bowling Green from 1997 to 2000, and served as a team captain his final two seasons. He started a total of 33 games in his career and recorded 131 tackles, including 28 for loss. Durkin led the team in sacks in 1998 and finished second in that category in 2000. He earned a bachelor's degree in business marketing in 2001, and a master's degree in educational administration and supervision in 2004.

== Coaching career ==
Durkin began a career in coaching immediately following his playing career. He worked as a graduate assistant at Bowling Green under new head coach Urban Meyer in 2001 and 2002, and at Notre Dame under head coach Tyrone Willingham in 2003 and 2004. He returned to Bowling Green in 2005, where he coached defensive ends, linebackers, and special teams on the staff of Gregg Brandon. In 2007, he moved to Stanford on the first staff of Jim Harbaugh, where he served for three seasons as the Cardinal defensive ends coach and special teams coordinator. In 2010, Durkin was reunited with Meyer when he joined the Florida Gators as linebackers coach and special teams coordinator. He remained on Florida's staff when Will Muschamp took over as head coach in 2010, and in 2013 was promoted to defensive coordinator, replacing Dan Quinn.

Durkin has a reputation as a strong national recruiter and was named the 2012 Rivals.com Recruiter of the Year.

On November 22, 2014, Durkin was named interim head coach for Florida's bowl game after the previous head coach, Will Muschamp, announced he would step down following the regular season. Durkin led Florida to a 28–20 victory in the 2015 Birmingham Bowl against East Carolina.

On January 5, 2015, sources confirmed that Durkin was hired as the defensive coordinator of Michigan. The hire reunited Durkin with new Michigan head coach Jim Harbaugh. Michigan confirmed the hire on January 8, and announced that Durkin would also coach linebackers.

On December 2, 2015 ESPN's Joe Schad announced that Durkin was expected to be named head coach of the Maryland Terrapins football team, which was confirmed later that day. Durkin would lead the team to a bowl game appearance in his first year. Following a scandal involving the death of a player and reports of a toxic team culture, Durkin was fired by Maryland midway through the 2018 season.

On January 2, 2020, Ole Miss announced it had hired Durkin as an assistant to head coach Lane Kiffin, along with Chris Partridge and Joe Jon Finley.

On January 5, 2022, it was announced Durkin would become the new defensive coordinator at Texas A&M under Jimbo Fisher.

On January 31, 2024, Auburn had announced that it had hired Durkin as their next defensive coordinator.

On November 2, 2025, Durkin was named Auburn's interim head coach after the firing of Hugh Freeze, going 1-2. After Alex Golesh was hired as the program's head coach on November 30, Durkin was retained as defensive coordinator.

== Player death at Maryland and resulting scandal ==
On August 11, 2018, Durkin was placed on administrative leave after Maryland was placed under investigation amid toxic culture allegations against the team after the death of player Jordan McNair. McNair was hospitalized on May 29, 2018 after showing signs of heatstroke and exhaustion while participating in a team workout, and later died at the age of 19.

Durkin returned from leave 80 days later, following the Board of Regents recommendation for him to stay. Damon Evans, the athletic director, announced the Board of Regents' decision to the team with Durkin present; Durkin later held a meeting with the team without other coaches, and several players walked out of that meeting. Due to intense backlash, Durkin was fired one day later.

== Head coaching record ==
Year	Team	Overall	Conference	Standing	Bowl/playoffs
Florida Gators (Southeastern Conference) (2014)
2014	Florida	1–0 (Note: Durkin coached the 2015 Birmingham Bowl after head coach Will Muschamp was fired following a 6–5 (4–4 SEC) regular season.)			W Birmingham
Florida:		1–0			
Maryland Terrapins (Big Ten Conference) (2016–2017)
2016	Maryland	6–7	3–6	5th (East)	L Quick Lane
2017	Maryland	4–8	2–7	6th (East)	
Maryland:		10–15	5-13		
Auburn Tigers (Southeastern Conference) (2025)
2025	Auburn	1–2	0–2	T–13th	
Auburn:		1–2	0–2		
Total:		12–17			
