= Jaylon Ferguson =

American football player (1995–2022)

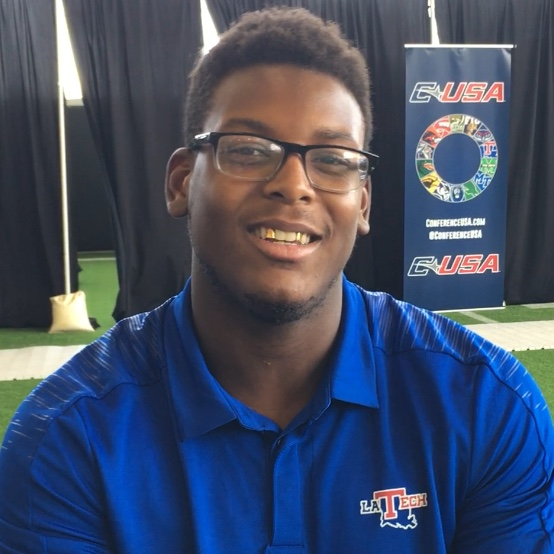
- Ferguson at 2018 C-USA Kickoff

No. 45
- Position: Linebacker

Personal information
- Born: December 14, 1995; Zachary, Louisiana, U.S.
- Died: June 21, 2022 (aged 26); Baltimore, Maryland, U.S.
- Listed height: 6 ft 5 in (1.96 m)
- Listed weight: 270 lb (122 kg)

Career information
- High school: West Feliciana (Bains, Louisiana)
- College: Louisiana Tech (2014–2018)
- NFL draft: 2019: 3rd round, 85th overall pick

Career history
- Baltimore Ravens (2019–2021)

Awards and highlights
- C-USA Defensive Player of the Year (2018); 2× First-team All-C-USA (2017, 2018)

Career NFL statistics
- Total tackles: 67
- Sacks: 4.5
- Pass deflections: 2
- Fumble Recoveries: 2
- Stats at Pro Football Reference

Jaylon O'Neal Ferguson (December 14, 1995 – June 21, 2022) was an American professional football player who was a linebacker in the National Football League (NFL). He played college football for the Louisiana Tech Bulldogs before being selected by the Baltimore Ravens in the third round of the 2019 NFL draft. He played three seasons with the Ravens.

== Early life ==
Ferguson attended West Feliciana High School in St. Francisville, Louisiana, where he played football and basketball for four years.

== College career ==
Ferguson redshirted his first year at Louisiana Tech University in 2014. In 2015, he played in 12 games with five starts and recorded 35 tackles and six sacks. As a sophomore in 2016, he set the school record for sacks in a season with 14.5. As a junior in 2017, Ferguson had 38 tackles and seven sacks. He returned to Louisiana Tech for his senior year in 2018. During the season he broke the school record for career sacks and broke his own school record for sacks in a single-season with 17.5. Ferguson became the Football Bowl Subdivision career sack leader during the 2018 Hawaii Bowl, and was also named winning-team MVP of that game.

In February 2019, the National Football League (NFL) rescinded their invitation to Ferguson to attend the NFL Scouting Combine after discovering his misdemeanor simple battery conviction from 2015.

=== College statistics ===
Jaylon Ferguson			Defense					
Season	Team	GP	Cmb	TfL	Sck	Int	PD	FF
2015	Louisiana Tech	12	35	15.0	6.0	0	1	2
2016	Louisiana Tech	14	49	14.0	14.5	0	2	3
2017	Louisiana Tech	11	38	12.5	7.0	0	0	0
2018	Louisiana Tech	13	65	26.0	17.5	0	3	2
Totals		50	187	67.5	45.0	0	6	7

== Professional career ==
Pre-draft measurables
Height	Weight	Arm length	Hand span	40-yard dash	10-yard split	20-yard split	20-yard shuttle	Three-cone drill	Vertical jump	Broad jump	Bench press
6 ft 4 3/4 in (1.95 m)	271 lb (123 kg)	34 1/2 in (0.88 m)	9 1/8 in (0.23 m)	4.82 s	1.69 s	2.78 s	5.12 s	8.08 s	32.0 in (0.81 m)	9 ft 9 in (2.97 m)	24 reps
All values from NFL Combine/Pro Day

Ferguson was selected by the Baltimore Ravens in the third round (85th overall) of the 2019 NFL draft. On July 19, 2019, Ferguson was placed on the reserve/NFI list with a hamstring injury. He was removed two days later. On September 22, 2019, Ferguson made his NFL debut, recording 18 snaps against the Kansas City Chiefs. He recorded his first-career tackle two weeks later against the Pittsburgh Steelers. He made his first NFL start on November 3 against the New England Patriots. On November 17, Ferguson recorded his first-career sack against the Houston Texans, bringing down Deshaun Watson in the second quarter. Three weeks later, he recorded his second sack against the Buffalo Bills, sacking Josh Allen.

In Week 4 of the 2020 season against the Washington Football Team, Ferguson recorded his first sack of the season on Dwayne Haskins during the 31–17 win. Ferguson was placed on the reserve/COVID-19 list by the Ravens on November 28, 2020, and activated two days later. In the 2020 season, Ferguson started in one game and appeared in 14 total, finishing the season with 2.0 sacks and 30 tackles. In 2021, Ferguson appeared in 10 games, recording six tackles but no sacks.

== Personal life and death ==
Ferguson had a son and two daughters with his fiancée.

Ferguson died in Baltimore on June 21, 2022, at the age of 26. Police indicated that while the death was "questionable", there were initially no signs of foul play or trauma. The next day, the Ravens released a statement stating: "We are profoundly saddened by the tragic passing of Jaylon Ferguson. He was a kind, respectful young man with a big smile and infectious personality. We express our heartfelt condolences to Jaylon's family and friends as we mourn a life lost much too soon." His death was later declared to be caused by the combined effects of fentanyl and cocaine, and it was ruled that the death was accidental.

Ferguson's brother, Jazz Ferguson, formerly played for the DC Defenders of the XFL.

== See also ==
- List of gridiron football players who died during their careers
