= USS Hart =

Two ships of the United States Navy have borne the name USS Hart. The first Hart was named for Midshipman Ezekiel Hart, who died in the War of 1812, and Lieutenant Commander John E. Hart, who died in the Civil War. The second Hart was named for Lieutenant Patrick H. Hart (1915–1942), who died in the Battle of Midway.

- USS Hart (DD-110), was a Wickes-class destroyer, launched in 1918 and struck in 1931
- USS Hart (DD-594), was a Fletcher-class destroyer, launched in 1944 and struck in 1973
