= Warren Davis Folkes =

American politician (1898–1997)

Louisiana State Representative
- In office 1944–1955
- Preceded by: Thomas D. Gilmore
- Succeeded by: James P. Leake
- Constituency: West Feliciana Parish

Louisiana State Senator
- In office 1955–1968
- Preceded by: E. M. Toler
- Succeeded by: J. E. Jumonville Sr.
- Constituency: Ascension, Assumption, East Baton Rouge, Iberville, Pointe Coupee, West Baton Rouge, and West Feliciana parishes

Louisiana State Representative
- In office 1968–1976
- Preceded by: James P. Leake
- Succeeded by: Joe Allen Fudge
- Constituency: West Feliciana and East Baton Rouge parishes

Personal details
- Born: January 4, 1898 St. Francisville, Louisiana, U.S.
- Died: June 13, 1997 (aged 99)
- Resting place: Grace Episcopal Church Cemetery in St. Francisville
- Party: Democratic
- Spouse: Alice Winfield Pipes Folkes
- Children: Alice Folkes Bankston; Four grandchildren
- Parent(s): Cheston and Jessie Davis Folkes
- Education: University of Louisiana at Lafayette
- Occupation: Farmer

Warren Davis Folkes (January 4, 1898 – June 14, 1997) was a Louisiana politician who served in the Louisiana House of Representatives from 1944 to 1955, and from 1968 to 1976, and in the Louisiana State Senate from 1955 to 1968.

Preceded by Thomas D. Gilmore	Louisiana State Representative for West Feliciana Parish; 1944–1955	Succeeded by James R. Leake
Preceded by E. M. Toler	Louisiana State Senator for now District 17 (Ascension, Assumption, East Baton Rouge, Iberville, Pointe Coupee, West Baton Rouge, and West Feliciana parishes); 1955–1968	Succeeded by J. E. Jumonville Sr.
Preceded by James R. Leake	Louisiana State Representative for West Feliciana and East Baton Rouge parishes 1968–1976	Succeeded by Joe Allen Fudge
