= Senator Leake (disambiguation) =

Walter Leake (1762–1825) was a U.S. Senator from Mississippi from 1817 to 1820. Senator Leake may also refer to:

- Joseph Bloomfield Leake (1828–1918), Iowa State Senate
- William Walter Leake (1833–1912), Louisiana State Senate
