= Cat Island National Wildlife Refuge =

Protected area of Louisiana, United States

- IUCN category IV (habitat/species management area)
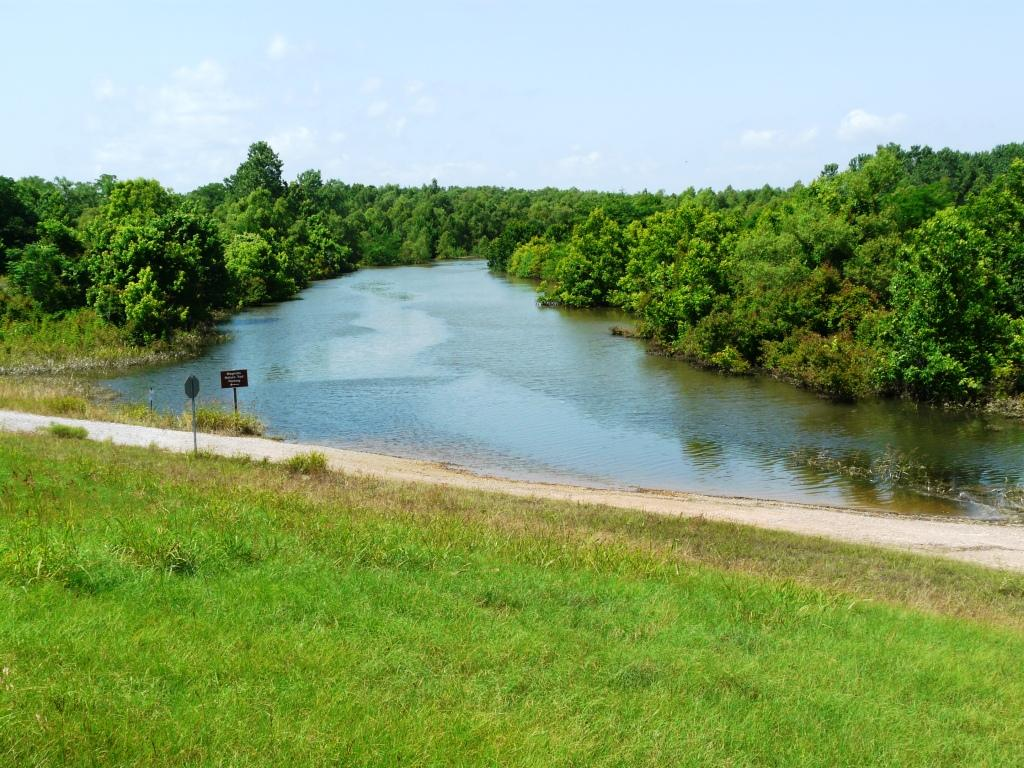

- Location within the United States Location within Louisiana
- Location: West Feliciana Parish, Louisiana, United States
- Nearest city: St. Francisville, Louisiana
- Coordinates: 30°47′30″N 91°29′30″W
- Area: 9,623 acres (38.9 km^{2})
- Established: 2000
- Governing body: U.S. Fish and Wildlife Service
- Website: Cat Island National Wildlife Refuge

Cat Island National Wildlife Refuge

Cat Island National Wildlife Refuge was established on October 27, 2000, as the 526th refuge in the United States National Wildlife Refuge System. It is located near the town of St. Francisville, Louisiana, which is 30 miles (48 km) north of Baton Rouge. The refuge was established to conserve, restore, and manage native forested wetland habitats for migratory birds, aquatic resources, and endangered and threatened plants and animals. Additionally, it was created to encourage the use of volunteers and facilitate partnerships among the U.S. Fish and Wildlife Service, local communities, and conservation organizations to promote public awareness of resources of the refuge and the National Wildlife Refuge System.

== Establishment ==
In 2000, The Nature Conservancy of Louisiana purchased the land that would become Cat Island National Wildlife Refuge. The land was acquired, in stages, by the United States Fish and Wildlife Service. By 2003, the refuge grew to its current size of 9,623 acres (38.9 km^{2}). The congressionally approved acquisition boundary is 36,500 acres (148 km^{2}).

== Natural history ==
Cat Island National Wildlife Refuge is along the southernmost portion of the lower Mississippi River, which does not have levees. It experiences floods most years. The refuge is home to many species, including the federally listed Louisiana black bear. The Mississippi River is a major bird migration corridor; it is located within an area of high importance for neotropical migratory birds, including the swallow-tailed kite, which is a species of special concern. Other wildlife found in the area include white-tailed deer, bobcat, mink, river otter, wild turkey, black-crowned night-heron, wood duck, blue-winged teal, woodcock, solitary sandpiper, greater yellowlegs, prothonotary warbler, northern parula, pileated woodpecker, green tree frog, and red-eared slider.

The refuge includes several habitat types, including overcup oak-bitter pecan, hackberry-elm-ash, nuttall oak-ash-sweetgum, and shrub-scrub swamp. The most unusual habitat type is old growth baldcypress-tupelo. Many of the baldcypress trees are estimated to be 500 to 1,000 years old. The National Champion baldcypress, which is the largest tree of any species east of the Sierra Nevada mountain range, is found in the refuge about 4.8 miles (7.7 km) from the entrance gate. The tree has a buttressed trunk that splits into two canopies, and the buttresses are deep enough for a human being to hide inside.

== Access ==
The refuge is inundated by the river to varying degrees, generally between January and June. The refuge is accessible by vehicle when the Mississippi River gauge reading in Baton Rouge is under approximately 26 feet (7.9 m). A series of gates have been installed along the road, which allow access as the river rises and falls. No access to the National Champion baldcypress tree is available once the Baton Rouge gauge reaches 26 feet (7.9 m). All vehicular access to the refuge ends at 31 feet (9.4 m).
