= 2018 Conference USA football season =

- League: NCAA Division I Football Bowl Subdivision
- Sport: Football
- Duration: August 25, 2018 through December 22, 2019
- Teams: 14
- TV partner(s): CBS Sports Network, Stadium, beIN Sports, ESPN

2019 NFL Draft
- Top draft pick: RB Devin Singletary, FAU
- Picked by: Buffalo Bills, 74th overall

Regular season
- Season MVP: QB Brent Stockstill, MTSU
- East champions: Middle Tennessee
- West champions: UAB

Championship Game
- Champions: UAB
- Runners-up: Middle Tennessee
- Finals MVP: RB Spencer Brown, UAB

Seasons
- 2017 2019

2018 Conference USA football standings
	Conf.			Overall
Team	W		L	W		L
East Division
Middle Tennessee x	7	–	1	8	–	6
FIU	6	–	2	9	–	4
Marshall	6	–	2	9	–	4
Charlotte	4	–	4	5	–	7
Florida Atlantic	3	–	5	5	–	7
Old Dominion	2	–	6	4	–	8
Western Kentucky	2	–	6	3	–	9
West Division
UAB x$	7	–	1	11	–	3
North Texas	5	–	3	9	–	4
Louisiana Tech	5	–	3	8	–	5
Southern Miss	5	–	3	6	–	5
UTSA	2	–	6	3	–	9
UTEP	1	–	7	1	–	11
Rice	1	–	7	2	–	11
Championship: UAB 27, Middle Tennessee 25
$ – Conference champion; x – Division champion/co-champions

The 2018 Conference USA football season is the 23rd season of Conference USA football and part of the 2018 NCAA Division I FBS football season. The season began on August 25 and concluded on November 24. This marked the fourth season since the 2014 realignment that took place in 2014 NCAA Division I FBS football season which added the 14 member Charlotte from the Atlantic 10 Conference. C-USA is a "Group of Five" conference under the College Football Playoff format along with the American Athletic Conference, the Mid–American Conference, the Mountain West Conference and the Sun Belt Conference. The entire schedule was released on January 23.

The conference consisted of 14 members. The C-USA Football Championship game was played on December 1.

== Preseason ==
=== Preseason awards ===
The conference preseason awards were released on July 16.

- Preseason Offensive Player of the Year: Devin Singletary, Junior, RB, Florida Atlantic
- Preseason Defensive Player of the Year: Azeez Al-Shaair, Senior, LB, Florida Atlantic
- Preseason Special Teams Player of the Year: Parker Shaunfield, Senior, K, Southern Miss

Offense
Position	Player	Class	Team
QB	Mason Fine	Junior	North Texas
QB	Brent Stockstill	Senior	Middle Tennessee
WR	Tyre Brady	Senior	Marshall
WR	Jalen Guyton	Senior	North Texas
WR	Ty Lee	Junior	Middle Tennessee
WR	Teddy Veal	Senior	Louisiana Tech
RB	Spencer Brown	Sophomore	UAB
RB	Devin Singletary	Junior	Florida Atlantic
OL	Reggie Bain	Senior	Florida Atlantic
OL	Chandler Brewer	Senior	Middle Tennessee
OL	Jordan Budwig	Senior	FIU
OL	Levi Brown	Junior	Marshall
OL	O'Shea Dugas	Senior	Louisiana Tech
TE	Harrison Bryant	Junior	Florida Atlantic

Defense
Position	Player	Class	Team
DL	Jaylon Ferguson	Sophomore	Louisiana Tech
DL	Fermin Silva	Senior	FIU
DL	Kevin Strong Jr.	Senior	UTSA
DL	Oshane Ximines	Senior	Old Dominion
LB	Azeez Al-Shaair	Senior	Florida Atlantic
LB	Khalil Brooks	Junior	Middle Tennessee
LB	Josiah Tauaefa	Junior	UTSA
LB	Chase Hancock	Senior	Marshall
DB	Ben DeLuca	Junior	Charlotte
DB	Malik Gant	Junior	Marshall
DB	Shelton Lewis	Senior	Florida Atlantic
DB	Amik Robertson	Sophomore	Louisiana Tech
DB	Jalen Young	Senior	Florida Atlantic

Specialists
Position	Player	Class	Team
P	Jack Fox	Senior	Rice
K	Parker Shaunfield	Senior	Southern Miss
KR	Isaiah Harper	Senior	Old Dominion
PR	Darrell Brown	Junior	Old Dominion
LS	Matt Beardall	Junior	Marshall

=== Media predictions ===
The 2018 preseason media football poll was released on July 17.

East Division
1. Florida Atlantic (22 first-place votes)
2. Marshall (4)
3. Middle Tennessee
4. FIU
5. Western Kentucky
6. Old Dominion
7. Charlotte
West Division
1. North Texas (18)
2. Louisiana Tech (4)
3. UAB (3)
4. Southern Miss (1)
5. UTSA
- T6. Rice
- T6. UTEP

== Head coaches ==
Note: All stats shown are before the beginning of the season.

Team	Head coach	Years at school	Overall record	Record at school	CUSA record
Charlotte	Brad Lambert	6	17–41	17–41	4–20
FIU	Butch Davis	2	71–48	8–5	5–3
Florida Atlantic	Lane Kiffin	2	46–24	11–3	8–0
Louisiana Tech	Skip Holtz	6	126–99	38–28	26–14
Marshall	Doc Holliday	9	61–42	61–42	39–25
Middle Tennessee	Rick Stockstill	13	79–72	79–72	26–14
North Texas	Seth Littrell	3	14–13	14–13	10–6
Old Dominion	Bobby Wilder	10	72–37	72–37	17–15
Rice	Mike Bloomgren	1	0–0	0–0	0–0
Southern Miss	Jay Hopson	3	47–28	15–11	10–6
UAB	Bill Clark	3	25–15	14–11	10–6
UTEP	Dana Dimel	1	30–39	0–0	0–0
UTSA	Frank Wilson	3	12–12	12–12	8–8
Western Kentucky	Mike Sanford Jr.	2	6–7	6–7	4–4

== Schedule ==
=== Regular season ===
Index to colors and formatting
C-USA member won
C-USA member lost
C-USA teams in **bold**

==== Week Zero ====
Date	Time	Visiting team	Home team	Site	TV	Result	Attendance	Ref.
August 25	6:00 p.m.	Prairie View A&M	**Rice**	Rice Stadium • Houston, TX	ESPN+	**W** 31–28	20,050	
^{#}Rankings from AP Poll released prior to game. All times are in Eastern Time.

==== Week One ====
Date	Time	Visiting team	Home team	Site	TV	Result	Attendance	Ref.
August 30	7:00 p.m.	Savannah State	**UAB**	Legion Field • Birmingham, AL	ESPN+	**W** 52–0	27,124	
August 31	8:00 p.m.	**Western Kentucky**	No. 4 Wisconsin	Camp Randall Stadium • Madison, WI	ESPN	**L** 3–34	74,145	
September 1	12:00 p.m.	**Florida Atlantic**	No. 7 Oklahoma	Gaylord Family Oklahoma Memorial Stadium • Norman, OK	FOX	**L** 14–63	86,402	
September 1	12:00 p.m.	Houston	**Rice**	Rice Stadium • Houston, TX (rivalry)	CBSSN	**L** 27–45	26,390	
September 1	3:30 p.m.	**Marshall**	Miami (OH)	Yager Stadium • Oxford, OH	ESPN+	**W** 35–28	15,827	
September 1	6:00 p.m.	Fordham	**Charlotte**	Jerry Richardson Stadium • Charlotte, NC	ESPN+	**W** 34–10	9,240	
September 1	6:00 p.m.	**Old Dominion**	Liberty	Williams Stadium • Lynchburg, VA	ESPN3	**L** 10–52	20,425	
September 1	7:00 p.m.	Indiana	**FIU**	Riccardo Silva Stadium • Miami, FL	CBSSN	**L** 28–38	17,082	
September 1	7:00 p.m.	**Louisiana Tech**	South Alabama	Ladd–Peebles Stadium • Mobile, AL	ESPN+	**W** 30–26	13,457	
September 1	7:00 p.m.	Jackson State	**Southern Miss**	M. M. Roberts Stadium • Hattiesburg, MS	ESPN+	**W** 55–7	29,176	
September 1	7:30 p.m.	**Middle Tennessee**	Vanderbilt	Vanderbilt Stadium • Nashville, TN	SECN	**L** 7–35	25,348	
September 1	7:30 p.m.	SMU	**North Texas**	Apogee Stadium • Denton, TX (Safeway Bowl)	Stadium	**W** 46–23	29,519	
September 1	7:30 p.m.	Northern Arizona	**UTEP**	Sun Bowl • El Paso, TX	ESPN3	**L** 10–30	17,271	
September 1	10:30 p.m.	**UTSA**	Arizona State	Sun Devil Stadium • Tempe, AZ	FS1	**L** 7–49	50,188	
^{#}Rankings from AP Poll released prior to game. All times are in Eastern Time.

==== Week Two ====
Date	Time	Visiting team	Home team	Site	TV	Result	Attendance	Ref.
September 8	2:00 p.m.	Air Force	**Florida Atlantic**	FAU Stadium • Boca Raton, FL	CBSSN	**W** 33–27	24,101	
September 8	6:00 p.m.	Appalachian State	**Charlotte**	Jerry Richardson Stadium • Charlotte, NC	ESPN+	**L** 9–45	19,151	
September 8	6:00 p.m.	UT Martin	**Middle Tennessee**	Johnny "Red" Floyd Stadium • Murfreesboro, TN	ESPN+	**W** 61–37	16,227	
September 8	6:30 p.m.	Eastern Kentucky	**Marshall**	Joan C. Edwards Stadium • Huntington, WV	ESPN+	**W** 32–16	24,304	
September 8	6:30 p.m.	Maine	**Western Kentucky**	Houchens Industries–L. T. Smith Stadium • Bowling Green, KY	ESPN+	**L** 28–31	15,178	
September 8	7:00 p.m.	Southern	**Louisiana Tech**	Joe Aillet Stadium • Ruston, LA	ESPN+	**W** 54–17	22,926	
September 8	7:00 p.m.	Louisiana–Monroe	**Southern Miss**	M. M. Roberts Stadium • Hattiesburg, MS	ESPN3	**L** 20–21	19,579	
September 8	7:00 p.m.	**UAB**	Coastal Carolina	Brooks Stadium • Conway, SC	ESPN+	**L** 24–47	9,776	
September 8	7:00 p.m.	Baylor	**UTSA**	Alamodome • San Antonio, TX	CBSSN	**L** 20–37	42,071	
September 8	7:30 p.m.	**FIU**	**Old Dominion**	Foreman Field • Norfolk, VA	beIN	**FIU** 28–20	19,243	
September 8	7:30 p.m.	Incarnate Word	**North Texas**	Apogee Stadium • Denton, TX	ESPN+	**W** 58–16	18,538	
September 8	8:00 p.m.	**UTEP**	UNLV	Sam Boyd Stadium • Whitney, NV	ATTSN	**L** 24–52	14,122	
September 9	12:00 a.m.	**Rice**	Hawaii	Aloha Stadium • Honolulu, HI	SPEC HI	**L** 29–43	23,112	
^{#}Rankings from AP Poll released prior to game. All times are in Eastern Time.

==== Week Three ====
Date	Time	Visiting team	Home team	Site	TV	Result	Attendance	Ref.
September 13 (Note: This game was originally scheduled for September 15. It was moved up two days in anticipation of Hurricane Florence.)	4:00 p.m.	**Old Dominion**	**Charlotte**	Jerry Richardson Stadium • Charlotte, NC	ESPN3	**CHAR** 28–25	8,204	
September 15	12:00 p.m.	**Middle Tennessee**	No. 3 Georgia	Sanford Stadium • Athens, GA	ESPNews	**L** 7–49	92,746	
September 15	12:00 p.m.	**UTEP**	Tennessee	Neyland Stadium • Knoxville, TN	SECN	**L** 0–24	87,074	
September 15	1:00 p.m.	Tulane	**UAB**	Legion Field • Birmingham, AL	Stadium	**W** 31–24	21,991	
~~September 15~~	~~3:30 p.m.~~	~~**Southern Miss**~~	~~Appalachian State~~	~~Kidd Brewer Stadium~~ • ~~Boone, NC~~	~~ESPN+~~	**Cancelled** (Note: This game has been cancelled in anticipation of Hurricane Florence.)		
September 15	4:00 p.m.	**North Texas**	Arkansas	Donald W. Reynolds Razorback Stadium • Fayetteville, AR	SECN	**W** 44–17	62,355	
September 15	4:00 p.m.	**UTSA**	Kansas State	Bill Snyder Family Football Stadium • Manhattan, KS	FSN	**L** 17–41	50,618	
September 15	6:00 p.m.	Bethune–Cookman	**Florida Atlantic**	FAU Stadium • Boca Raton, FL	Stadium	**W** 49–28	19,017	
September 15	7:30 p.m.	UMass	**FIU**	Ricardo Silva Stadium • Miami, FL	beIN	**W** 63–24	14,695	
~~September 15~~	~~7:30 p.m.~~	~~**Marshall**~~	~~South Carolina~~	~~Williams–Brice Stadium~~ • ~~Columbia, SC~~	~~ESPNU~~	**Cancelled**		
September 15	7:30 p.m.	**Western Kentucky**	Louisville	Cardinal Stadium • Louisville, KY	ACCRSN	**L** 17–20	54,923	
^{#}Rankings from AP Poll released prior to game. All times are in Eastern Time.

==== Week Four ====
Date	Time	Visiting team	Home team	Site	TV	Result	Attendance	Ref.
September 21	7:00 p.m.	**Florida Atlantic**	No. 16 UCF	Spectrum Stadium • Orlando, FL	ESPN	**L** 36–56	44,257	
September 22	2:00 p.m.	**Western Kentucky**	Ball State	Scheumann Stadium • Muncie, IN	ESPN3	**W** 28–20	15,873	
September 22	3:30 p.m.	**Charlotte**	UMass	McGuirk Stadium • Amherst, MA	ELVN	**L** 31–49	10,086	
September 22	3:30 p.m.	No. 13 Virginia Tech	**Old Dominion**	Forman Field • Norfolk, VA	CBSSN	**W** 49–35	20,532	
September 22	3:30 p.m.	**FIU**	No. 21 Miami (FL)	Hard Rock Stadium • Miami Gardens, FL	ESPN2	**L** 17–31	59,814	
September 22	6:00 p.m.	**North Texas**	Liberty	Williams Stadium • Lynchburg, VA	ESPN3	**W** 47–7	14,112	
September 22	6:00 p.m.	**Louisiana Tech**	No. 6 LSU	Tiger Stadium • Baton Rouge, LA	ESPNU	**L** 21–38	102,321	
September 22	7:00 p.m.	NC State	**Marshall**	Joan C. Edwards Stadium • Huntington, WV	CBSSN	**L** 37–20	32,349	
September 22	7:00 p.m.	**Rice**	**Southern Miss**	M. M. Roberts Stadium • Hattiesburg, MS	ESPN+	**USM** 40–22	20,159	
September 22	7:00 p.m.	Texas State	**UTSA**	Alamodome • San Antonio, TX (I-35 Rivalry)	ESPN+	**W** 25–21	29,205	
September 22	7:30 p.m.	New Mexico State	**UTEP**	Sun Bowl • El Paso, TX (Battle of I-10)	ESPN3	**L** 20–27	19,412	
^{#}Rankings from AP Poll released prior to game. All times are in Eastern Time.

==== Week Five ====
Date	Time	Visiting team	Home team	Site	TV	Result	Attendance	Ref.
September 29	3:30 p.m.	**Old Dominion**	East Carolina	Dowdy–Ficklen Stadium • Greenville, NC	ESPN3	**L** 35–37	35,047	
September 29	3:30 p.m.	**Rice**	Wake Forest	BB&T Field • Winston-Salem, NC	ACCN	**L** 24–56	24,519	
September 29	4:00 p.m.	**Southern Miss**	No. 10 Auburn	Jordan–Hare Stadium • Auburn, AL	SECN	**L** 13–24	83,792	
September 29	7:00 p.m.	**Florida Atlantic**	**Middle Tennessee**	Johnny "Red" Floyd Stadium • Murfreesboro, TN	Stadium	**MTSU** 25–24	17,299	
September 29	7:00 p.m.	**UTEP**	**UTSA**	Alamodome • San Antonio, TX	ESPN+	**UTSA** 30–21	20,176	
September 29	7:00 p.m.	**Charlotte**	**UAB**	Legion Field • Birmingham, AL	ESPN3	**UAB** 28–7	25,395	
September 29	7:30 p.m.	Arkansas–Pine Bluff	**FIU**	Riccardo Silva Stadium • Miami, FL	ESPN+	**W** 55–9	14,937	
September 29	7:30 p.m.	**Marshall**	**Western Kentucky**	Houchens Industries–L. T. Smith Stadium • Bowling Green, KY	Stadium	**MARSH** 20–17	20,176	
September 29	7:30 p.m.	**Louisiana Tech**	**North Texas**	Apogee Stadium • Denton, TX	beIN	**LT** 29–27	30,105	
^{#}Rankings from AP Poll released prior to game. All times are in Eastern Time.

==== Week Six ====
Date	Time	Visiting team	Home team	Site	TV	Result	Attendance	Ref.
October 5	7:30 p.m.	**Middle Tennessee**	**Marshall**	Joan C. Edwards Stadium • Huntington, WV	CBSSN	**MTSU** 34–24	25,979	
October 6	5:00 p.m.	**Old Dominion**	**Florida Atlantic**	FAU Stadium • Boca Raton, FL	Stadium	**FAU** 52–33	18,204	
October 6	7:00 p.m.	**UAB**	**Louisiana Tech**	Joe Aillet Stadium • Ruston, LA	Stadium	**UAB** 28–7	18,983	
October 6	7:00 p.m.	**UTSA**	**Rice**	Rice Stadium • Houston, TX	ESPN3	**UTSA** 20–3	19,170	
October 6	7:30 p.m.	**North Texas**	**UTEP**	Sun Bowl • El Paso, TX	beIN	**UNT** 27–24	12,809	
^{#}Rankings from AP Poll released prior to game. All times are in Eastern Time.

==== Week Seven ====
Date	Time	Visiting team	Home team	Site	TV	Result	Attendance	Ref.
October 13	1:00 p.m.	UAB	Rice	Rice Stadium • Houston, TX	ESPN+	**UAB** 42–0	18,916	
October 13	2:00 p.m.	Southern Miss	North Texas	Apogee Stadium • Denton, TX	ESPN3	**UNT** 30–7	18,252	
October 13	3:30 p.m.	Western Kentucky	Charlotte	Jerry Richardson Stadium • Charlotte, NC	ESPN+	**CHAR** 40–14	11,610	
October 13	3:30 p.m.	Marshall	Old Dominion	Foreman Field • Norfolk, VA	Stadium	**MARSH** 42–20	20,118	
October 13	7:00 p.m.	Louisiana Tech	UTSA	Alamodome • San Antonio, TX	ESPN+	**LT** 31–3	20,057	
October 13	7:30 p.m.	Middle Tennessee	FIU	Riccardo Silva Stadium • Miami, FL	beIN	**FIU** 24–21	16,002	
^{#}Rankings from AP Poll released prior to game. All times are in Eastern Time.

==== Week Eight ====
Date	Time	Visiting team	Home team	Site	TV	Result	Attendance	Ref.
October 20	2:30 p.m.	Florida Atlantic	Marshall	Joan C. Edwards Stadium • Huntington, WV	CBSSN	**MARSH** 31–7	23,825	
October 20	3:00 p.m.	Charlotte	Middle Tennessee	Johnny "Red" Floyd Stadium • Murfreesboro, TN	ESPN3	**MTSU** 21–13	23,825	
October 20	3:30 p.m.	UTEP	Louisiana Tech	Joe Aillet Stadium • Ruston, LA	ESPN+	**LT** 31–24	18,972	
October 20	7:00 p.m.	UTSA	Southern Miss	M. M. Roberts Stadium • Hattiesburg, MS	ESPN+	**USM** 27–17	21,259	
October 20	7:30 p.m.	Rice	FIU	Riccardo Silva Stadium • Miami, FL	ESPN+	**FIU** 36–17	13,741	
October 20	7:30 p.m.	Old Dominion	Western Kentucky	Houchens Industries–L. T. Smith Stadium • Bowling Green, Kentucky	ESPN+	**ODU** 37–34	13,269	
October 20	7:30 p.m.	North Texas	UAB	Legion Field • Birmingham, AL	beIN	**UAB** 29–21	28,014	
^{#}Rankings from AP Poll released prior to game. All times are in Eastern Time.

==== Week Nine ====
Date	Time	Visiting team	Home team	Site	TV	Result	Attendance	Ref.
October 26	6:30 p.m.	Louisiana Tech	Florida Atlantic	FAU Stadium • Boca Raton, FL	CBSSN	**LT** 21–13	14,948	
October 27	2:00 p.m.	Southern Miss	Charlotte	Jerry Richardson Stadium • Charlotte, NC	ESPN3	**CHAR** 20–17	8,687	
October 27	3:30 p.m.	Middle Tennessee	Old Dominion	Foreman Field • Norfolk, VA	ESPN+	**MTSU** 51–17	19,725	
October 27	4:00 p.m.	Rice	North Texas	Apogee Stadium • Denton, TX	ESPN+	**UNT** 41–17	25,379	
October 27	7:30 p.m.	FIU	Western Kentucky	Houchens Industries–L. T. Smith Stadium • Bowling Green, KY	beIN	**FIU** 38–17	15,138	
October 27	7:30 p.m.	UAB	UTEP	Sun Bowl • El Paso, TX	ESPN+	**UAB** 19–0	10,787	
^{#}Rankings from AP Poll released prior to game. All times are in Eastern Time.

==== Week Ten ====
Date	Time	Visiting team	Home team	Site	TV	Result	Attendance	Ref.
November 2	8:00 p.m.	Western Kentucky	**Middle Tennessee**	Johnny "Red" Floyd Stadium • Murfreesboro, TN (100 Miles of Hate)	CBSSN	**MTSU** 29–10	16,617	
November 3	3:00 p.m.	Marshall	**Southern Miss**	M. M. Roberts Stadium • Hattiesburg, MS	Stadium	**USM** 26–24	20,375	
November 3	3:30 p.m.	UTEP	**Rice**	Rice Stadium • Houston, TX	ESPN3	**UTEP** 34–26	18,420	
November 3	4:00 p.m.	Charlotte	Tennessee	Neyland Stadium • Knoxville, TN	SECN	**L** 3–14	86,753	
November 3	7:30 p.m.	Florida Atlantic	**FIU**	Riccardo Silva Stadium • Miami, FL (Shula Bowl)	Stadium	**FAU** 49–14	18,478	
November 3	7:30 p.m.	UTSA	**UAB**	Legion Field • Birmingham, AL	beIN	**UAB** 52–3	17,605	
November 3	7:30 p.m.	Louisiana Tech	No. 21 Mississippi State	Davis Wade Stadium • Starkville, MS	SECN	**L** 3–45	58,709	
^{#}Rankings from AP Poll released prior to game. All times are in Eastern Time.

==== Week Eleven ====
Date	Time	Visiting team	Home team	Site	TV	Result	Attendance	Ref.
November 10	2:30 p.m.	Charlotte	Marshall	Joan C. Edwards Stadium • Huntington, WV	ESPN+	**MARSH** 30–13	19,418	
November 10	3:00 p.m.	Middle Tennessee	UTEP	Sun Bowl • El Paso, TX	ESPN+	**MTSU** 48–32	9,690	
November 10	3:30 p.m.	North Texas	Old Dominion	Foreman Field • Norfolk, VA	ESPN3	**ODU** 34–31	18,062	
November 10	3:30 p.m.	Southern Miss	UAB	Legion Field • Birmingham, AL	beIN	**UAB** 26–23 ^{OT}	25,618	
November 10	5:00 p.m.	Western Kentucky	Florida Atlantic	FAU Stadium • Boca Raton, FL	Stadium	**FAU** 24–15	14,400	
November 10	7:00 p.m.	FIU	UTSA	Alamodome • San Antonio, TX	ESPN+	**FIU** 45–7	16,874	
November 10	7:00 p.m.	Rice	Louisiana Tech	Joe Aillet Stadium • Ruston, LA	ESPN+	**LT** 28–13	15,283	
^{#}Rankings from AP Poll released prior to game. All times are in Eastern Time.

==== Week Twelve ====
Date	Time	Visiting team	Home team	Site	TV	Result	Attendance	Ref.
November 15	9:30 p.m.	**Florida Atlantic**	**North Texas**	Apogee Stadium • Denton, TX	CBSSN	**UNT** 41–38	18,338	
November 17	12:00 p.m.	**Middle Tennessee**	No. 20 Kentucky	Kroger Field • Lexington, KY	SECN	**L** 23–34	47,535	
November 17	2:00 p.m.	**FIU**	**Charlotte**	Jerry Richardson Stadium • Charlotte, NC	ESPN3	**FIU** 42–35	13,371	
November 17	2:00 p.m.	VMI	**Old Dominion**	Foreman Field • Norfolk, VA	ESPN+	**W** 77–14	20,118	
November 17	2:30 p.m.	**UTSA**	**Marshall**	Joan C. Edwards Stadium • Huntington, WV	Stadium	**MARSH** 23–0	18,502	
November 17	3:30 p.m.	**Louisiana Tech**	**Southern Miss**	M. M. Roberts Stadium • Hattiesburg, MS (Rivalry in Dixie)	Stadium	**USM** 21–20	19,142	
November 17	7:00 p.m.	**UAB**	Texas A&M	Kyle Field • College Station, TX	ESPN2	**L** 20–41	97,584	
November 17	7:30 p.m.	**UTEP**	**Western Kentucky**	Houchens Industries–L. T. Smith Stadium • Bowling Green, KY	beIN	**WKU** 40–16	6,221	
November 17	7:30 p.m.	**Rice**	No. 10 LSU	Tiger Stadium • Baton Rouge, LA	ESPNU	**L** 10–42	100,323	
^{#}Rankings from AP Poll released prior to game. All times are in Eastern Time.

==== Week Thirteen ====
Date	Time	Visiting team	Home team	Site	TV	Result	Attendance	Ref.
November 24	12:00 p.m.	Marshall	FIU	Riccardo Silva Stadium • Miami, FL	Stadium	**MARSH** 28–25	14,862	
November 24	12:00 p.m.	Western Kentucky	Louisiana Tech	Joe Aillet Stadium • Ruston, LA	CBSSN	**WKU** 30–15	11,459	
November 24	1:00 p.m.	Old Dominion	Rice	Rice Stadium • Houston, TX	ESPN+	**RICE** 27–13	18,083	
November 24	3:00 p.m.	UAB	Middle Tennessee	Johnny "Red" Floyd Stadium • Murfreesboro, TN	ESPN3	**MTSU** 27–3	14,411	
November 24	3:00 p.m.	Southern Miss	UTEP	Sun Bowl • El Paso, TX	ESPN+	**USM** 39–7	14,962	
November 24	6:00 p.m.	Charlotte	Florida Atlantic	FAU Stadium • Boca Raton, FL	Stadium	**CHAR** 27–24	11,638	
November 24	7:00 p.m.	North Texas	UTSA	Alamodome • San Antonio, TX	ESPN+	**UNT** 24–21	19,874	
^{#}Rankings from AP Poll released prior to game. All times are in Eastern Time.

==== Week Fourteen ====
Date	Time	Visiting team	Home team	Site	TV	Result	Attendance	Ref.
December 1	12:00 p.m.	**Marshall**	Virginia Tech	Lane Stadium • Blacksburg, VA	ACCN Extra	**L** 20–41	31,336	
^{#}Rankings from AP Poll released prior to game. All times are in Eastern Time.

This game was added after both teams lost a game due to being canceled by Hurricane Florence. Virginia Tech was to play East Carolina while Marshall was to play South Carolina.

==== Conference USA Championship Game ====
Date	Time	Visiting team	Home team	Site	TV	Result	Attendance	Ref.
December 1	1:30 p.m.	UAB	Middle Tennessee	Johnny "Red" Floyd Stadium • Murfreesboro, TN	CBSSN	**UAB** 27–25	15,806	
^{#}Rankings from AP Poll released prior to game. All times are in Eastern Time.

== Postseason ==
=== Bowl games ===
Legend
C-USA win
C-USA loss

Bowls based on contractual tie-ins. Actual bowls attended by C-USA members may vary and will be announced following the regular season.

Bowl game	Date	Site	Television	Time (EST)	C-USA Team	Opponent	Score	Attendance
New Mexico Bowl	December 15	Dreamstyle Stadium • Albuquerque, NM	ESPN	2:00 p.m.	North Texas	Utah State	13–52	25,387
New Orleans Bowl	December 15	Mercedes-Benz Superdome • New Orleans, LA	ESPN	9:00 p.m.	Middle Tennessee	Appalachian State	13–45	23,942
Boca Raton Bowl	December 18	FAU Stadium • Boca Raton, FL	ESPN	7:00 p.m.	UAB	Northern Illinois	37–13	22,614
Gasparilla Bowl	December 20	Raymond James Stadium • Tampa, FL	ESPN	8:00 p.m.	Marshall	South Florida	38–20	14,135
Bahamas Bowl	December 21	Thomas Robinson Stadium • Nassau, Bahamas	ESPN	12:30 p.m.	FIU	Toledo	35–32	13,510
Hawaii Bowl	December 22	Aloha Stadium • Honolulu, HI	ESPN	10:30 p.m.	Louisiana Tech	Hawaii	31–14	30,911

=== Awards and honors ===
==== All conference teams ====
First team
Position	Player	Class	Team
First team offense
QB	Brent Stockstill	Gr.	Middle Tennessee
RB	Devin Singletary	Jr.	Florida Atlantic
RB	Spencer Brown	So.	UAB
WR	Tyre Brady	RSr.	Marshall
WR	Rico Bussey	Jr.	North Texas
WR	Quez Watkins	So.	Southern Miss
TE	Harrison Bryant	Jr.	Florida Atlantic
OL	Reggie Bain	RSr.	Florida Atlantic
OL	O’Shea Dugas	Sr.	Louisiana Tech
OL	Levi Brown	RJr.	Marshall
OL	Chandler Brewer	Sr.	Middle Tennessee
OL	Justice Powers	Sr.	UAB
First Team defense
DL	Alex Highsmith	RJr.	Charlotte
DL	Jaylon Ferguson	RSr.	Louisiana Tech
DL	LaDarius Hamilton	Jr.	North Texas
DL	Oshane Ximines	Sr.	Old Dominion
DL	Jacques Turner	RJr.	Southern Miss
LB	Sage Lewis	RJr.	FIU
LB	Darius Harris	RSr.	Middle Tennessee
LB	EJ Ejiya	RSr.	North Texas
DB	Amik Robertson	So.	Louisiana Tech
DB	Malik Gant	RJr.	Marshall
DB	Reed Blankenship	So.	Middle Tennessee
DB	Kemon Hall	Sr.	North Texas
First Team Special Teams
PK	Cole Hedlund	Gr.	North Texas
P	Jack Fox	Sr.	Rice
RT	Isaiah Harper	Sr.	Old Dominion
RT	Maurice Alexander	RJr.	FIU
ST	Matt Beardall	Jr.	Marshall

== Non-conference records ==
=== Power Five conferences ===
Power 5 Conferences	Record
ACC	1–3
Big Ten	0–2
Big 12	0–3
Pac-12	0–1
SEC	1–10
Power 5 Total	2–19

=== Group of Five conferences ===
Group of 5 Conferences	Record
American	2–3
Mountain West	2–3
MAC	2–0
Sun Belt	2–4
Group of 5 Total	8–10

=== FBS independents ===
FBS Independents	Record
FBS Independents	2–3

=== FCS conferences ===
FCS Opponents	Record
Football Championship Subdivision	11–2

== Home game attendance ==
Team	Stadium	Capacity	Game 1	Game 2	Game 3	Game 4	Game 5	Game 6	Game 7	Total	Average	% of Capacity
Charlotte	Jerry Richardson Stadium	15,314	9,240	**19,151** †	8,204	11,610	8,687	13,371		61,023	10,171	66.4%
FIU	Riccardo Silva Stadium	20,000	17,082	14,695	14,937	16,002	13,741	18,478 †	14,862	109,797	15,685	78.4%
Florida Atlantic	FAU Stadium	29,419	24,101 †	19,017	18,205	14,948	14,400	11,638		102,309	17,052	58.0%
Louisiana Tech	Joe Aillet Stadium	28,562	22,926 †	18,983	18,972	15,283	11,459			87,623	17,525	61.4%
Marshall	Joan C. Edwards Stadium	38,227	24,304	32,349 †	25,979	23,825	19,418	18,502		144,377	24,063	62.9%
Middle Tennessee	Johnny "Red" Floyd Stadium	30,788	16,227	17,299	23,825 †	16,617	14,411			88,379	17,676	57.4%
North Texas	Apogee Stadium	30,850	29,519	18,538	30,105 †	18,252	25,379	18,338		140,131	23,355	75.7%
Old Dominion	Foreman Field	20,118	19,243	**20,532** †	20,118	19,725	18,062	20,118		117,798	19,633	97.6%
Rice	Rice Stadium	47,000	20,050	26,390 †	19,170	18,916	18,420	18,083		121,029	20,172	42.9%
Southern Miss	M. M. Roberts Stadium	36,000	29,176 †	19,579	20,159	21,259	20,375	19,142		129,690	21,615	60.0%
UAB	Legion Field	71,594	27,124 †	21,991	25,395	28,014	17,605	25,618		145,747	24,291	33.9%
UTEP	Sun Bowl Stadium	51,500	17,271	19,412 †	12,809	10,787	9,690	14,962		84,931	14,155	27.5%
UTSA	Alamodome	65,000	42,071 †	29,205	20,176	20,057	16,874	19,874		148,257	24,710	38.0%
WKU	Houchens Industries–L. T. Smith Stadium	22,113	15,178	20,176 †	13,269	15,138	6,221			69,982	13,996	63.3%

Bold – Exceed capacity
†Season High

== Weekly Awards ==
Players of the Week
Date	Offense	Defense	Special Teams
Sept 3	Mason Fine, QB, North Texas	James Jackson, S, Louisiana Tech	Quez Watkins, PR, Southern Miss.
Sept 10	Chris Robison, QB, Florida Atlantic	Rashad Smith, LB, Florida Atlantic	Jonathan Cruz, K, Charlotte
Sept 17	Mason Fine, QB, North Texas	Nate Brooks, CB, North Texas	Keegan Brewer, PR, North Texas
Sept 22	Blake LaRussa, QB, Old Dominion	Oshane Ximines, DE, Old Dominion	Jared Sacket, K, UTSA
Sept 29	Tyre Brady, WR, Marshall; Brent Stockstill, QB, Middle Tennessee	Jaylon Ferguson, DE, Louisiana Tech	Bailey Hale, K, Louisiana Tech
Oct 6	Brent Stockstill, QB, Middle Tennessee	Jovante Moffatt, S, Middle Tennessee	Kerrith Whyte, KR, Florida Atlantic
Oct 13	Tyler King, RB, Marshall; Xavier Ubosi, WR, UAB	Juwan Foggie, LB, Charlotte	José Borregales, K, FIU
Oct 20	Spencer Brown, RB, UAB	Malik Thompson, DL, Marshall	Isaiah Harper, KR, Old Dominion
Oct 27	DeAndre Torrey, RB, North Texas	Reed Blankenship, S, Middle Tennessee	Jonathan Cruz, K, Charlotte
Nov 3	Devin Singletary, RB, Florida Atlantic	Alex Highsmith, DE, Charlotte	Crews Holt, K, Middle Tennessee
Nov 10	Brent Stockstill, QB, Middle Tennessee	Tre’ Crawford, LB, UAB	Nick Rice, K, Old Dominion
Nov 17	DeAndre Torrey, RB, North Texas	Sage Lewis, LB, FIU; Omari Cobb, LB, Marshall	Isaiah Harper, KR, Old Dominion
Nov 24	Juma Otoviano, RB, Rice	DQ Thomas, LB, Middle Tennessee	Jonathan Cruz, K, Charlotte
