= Wakefield, Louisiana =

Wakefield
- Unincorporated community
- Location within the state of Louisiana
- Coordinates: 30°53′22″N 91°21′0″W
- Country: United States
- State: Louisiana
- Parish: West Feliciana
- Elevation: 246 ft (75 m)
- Time zone: UTC-6 (Central (CST))
  - Summer (DST): UTC-5 (CDT)
- ZIP code: 70784
- GNIS feature ID: 556342

Wakefield is an unincorporated community in West Feliciana Parish, Louisiana, United States. Its elevation is 246 feet (75 m).

The United States Postal Service, along U.S. Highway 61, serves the community.

== Education ==
West Feliciana Parish Public Schools serves the community. All residents are zoned to Bains Lower Elementary School, Bains Elementary School, West Feliciana Middle School, and West Feliciana High School.

== Notable person ==
- Isaac D. Smith, United States Army major general
