= West Feliciana Parish, Louisiana =

Parish in Louisiana, United States

West Feliciana Parish
- Parish
- Parish of West Feliciana; Paroisse de Feliciana Ouest (French); Parroquia de Feliciana Occidental (Spanish)
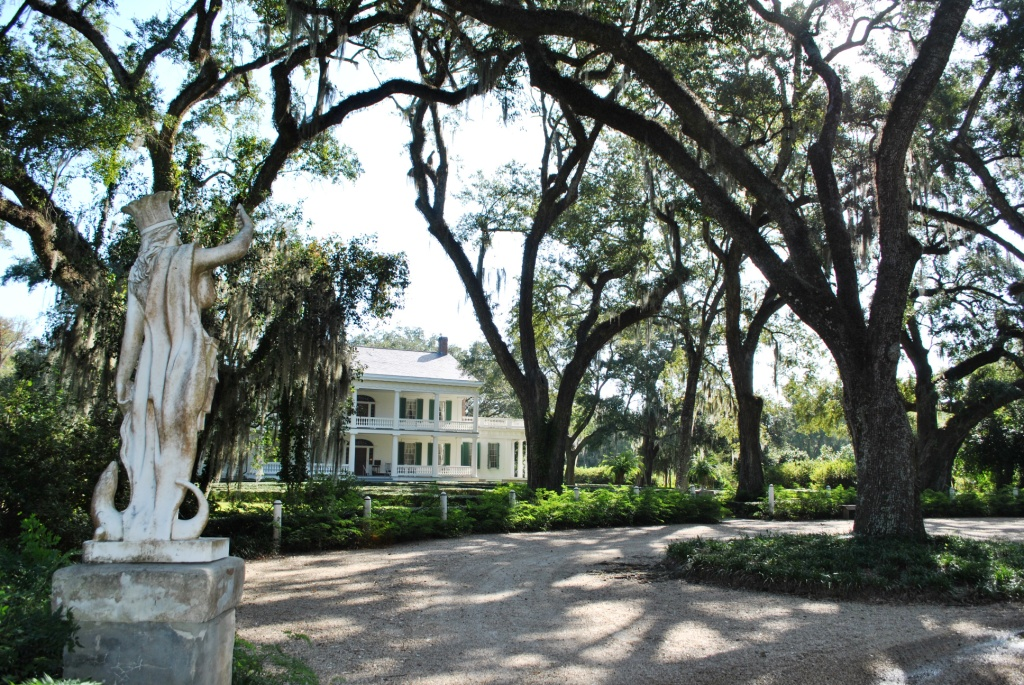
- Rosedown Plantation

- Seal

- Location within the U.S. state of Louisiana
- Coordinates: 30°52′N 91°25′W
- Country: United States
- State: Louisiana
- Founded: 1824
- Named for: Marie Félicité de Gálvez
- Seat: St. Francisville
- Largest town: St. Francisville

Area
  - Total: 426 sq mi (1,100 km^{2})
  - Land: 403 sq mi (1,040 km^{2})
  - Water: 23 sq mi (60 km^{2}) 5.3%

Population (2020)
  - Total: 15,310
  - Estimate (2025): 15,134 ▼
  - Density: 38.0/sq mi (14.7/km^{2})
- Time zone: UTC−6 (Central)
  - Summer (DST): UTC−5 (CDT)
- Congressional district: 5th
- Website: wfparish.org

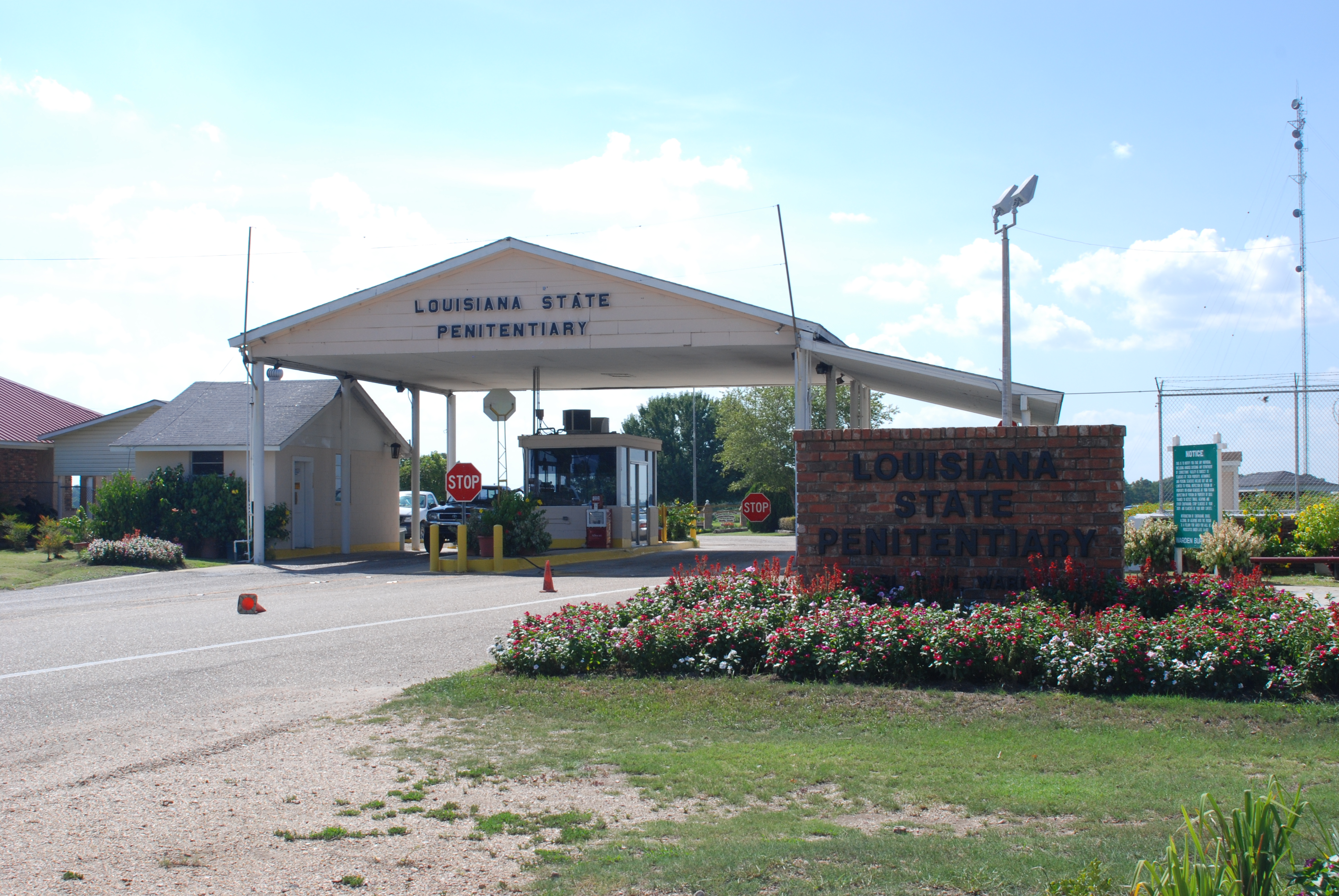
Louisiana State Penitentiary entrance

West Feliciana Parish (French: Paroisse de Feliciana Ouest; Spanish: Parroquia de Feliciana Occidental) is a civil parish located in the U.S. state of Louisiana. At the 2020 census, the population was 15,310. The parish seat is St. Francisville. The parish was established in 1824.

In 1824 Feliciana Parish was divided into East Feliciana Parish and West Feliciana Parish, in recognition of the increases in population throughout the parish. West Feliciana Parish is part of the Baton Rouge metropolitan statistical area.

The River Bend Nuclear Generating Station, operated by Entergy Nuclear, is located in West Feliciana Parish below St. Francisville. It produces approximately 10 percent of the total electric power demand in Louisiana. The Louisiana State Penitentiary is also located in the parish, in Angola. It occupies 18,000 acres at a site in a river bend, surrounded on three sides by water.

== History ==
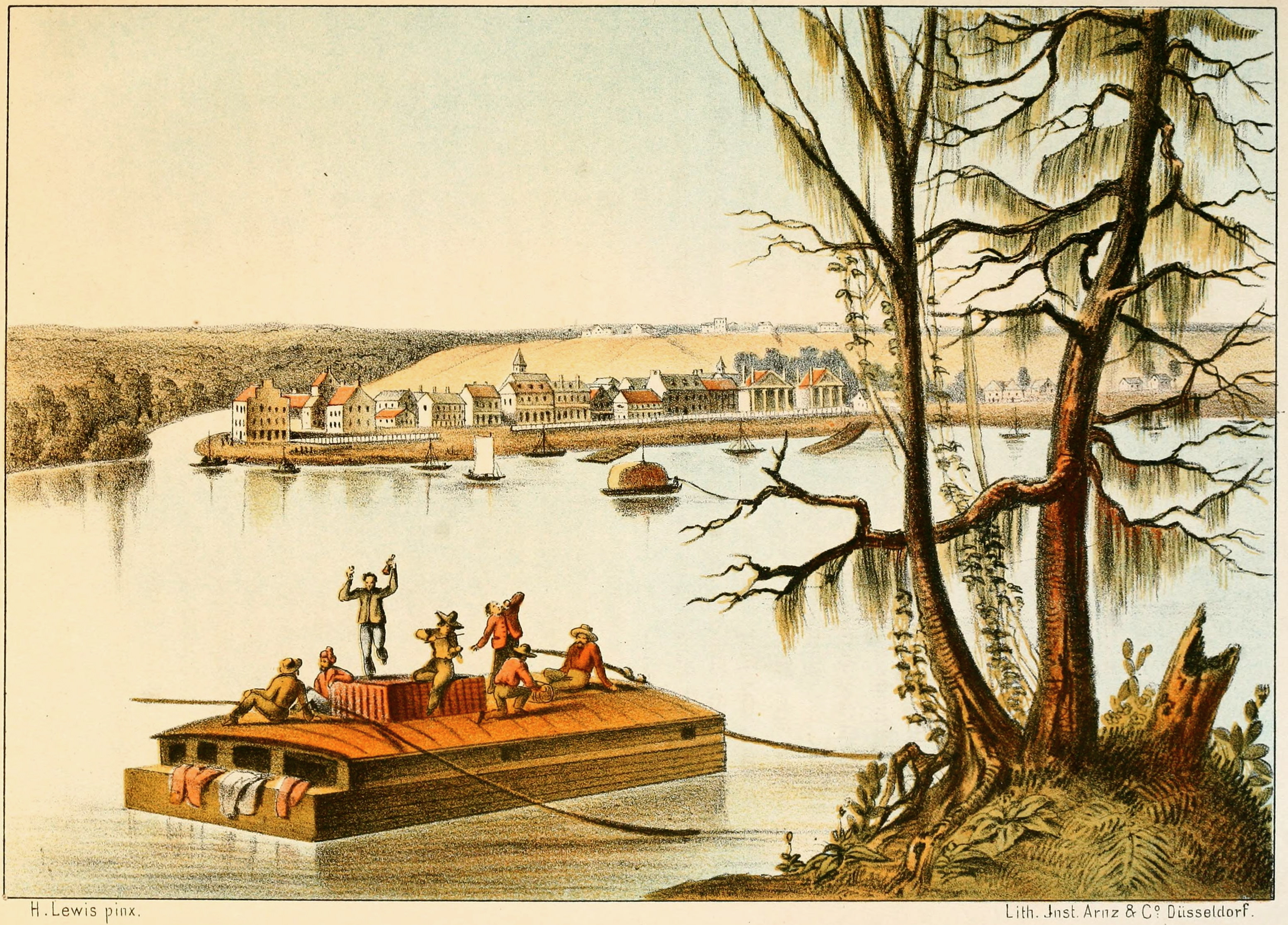
Bayou Sara seen from the Mississippi, late 1840s; St. Francisville on the rise in the background.

=== 18th and 19th centuries ===
Following the founding of the Bayou Sara settlement by French Franciscan/Capuchin monks in the late 17th century, the area was explored further by France, Spain, and Great Britain. The original settlement was flooded repeatedly and finally lost to the waters of the Mississippi River.

After 1763, when France was defeated by Britain in the Seven Years' War, it ceded its territories of La Louisiane east of the Mississippi River to Great Britain, which included it in its West Florida province. Spain gained control of the area in about 1780 – during the American Revolutionary War – and maintained its authority in the area for the next three decades.

In 1810, the colonists, many of whom were of British descent, rebelled against the Spanish colonial regime and established the short-lived independent Republic of West Florida. Within a few months, the United States declared the area to be part of the territory included in the Louisiana Purchase of 1803. (Today this region is called the Florida Parishes).

Feliciana Parish was established in 1810, in the Territory of Orleans, which was admitted to the Union two years later as the state of Louisiana. With continued growth of population, in 1824 Feliciana Parish was divided into the East Feliciana and West Feliciana parishes.

During the American Civil War, West Feliciana Parish provided financial assistance to the families of soldiers fighting for the Confederate States of America. Wives and children of soldiers were to receive from $10 to $40 per month, depending on family size.

=== West Feliciana and national politics ===
Since before the Civil War, white conservative voters in West Feliciana historically supported the Democratic Party. After Louisiana effectively disenfranchised most black voters under provisions of its 1898 constitution, the state joined others in the South as being a one-party state. The white-dominated legislature passed increasingly stringent Jim Crow and segregation legislation.

But after passage of Federal civil rights legislation in the mid-1960s, including protection of constitutional voting rights, many white conservatives in the South began to shift to the Republican Party, at least in terms of supporting Presidential candidates. In 1972, the year of Richard Nixon's re-election as President, after widespread anti-war protests and other cultural changes, West Feliciana was the only Louisiana parish to support the Democratic ticket of George McGovern and Sargent Shriver. During the same period, most African Americans in the South began to support the national Democratic Party, which had helped their drive for civil rights.

Since 2000, voters in the parish have supported the Republican Party candidates in Presidential elections. That year Bush-Cheney polled 2,512 votes (55 percent), compared to 2,187 (45 percent) for Democrats Al Gore and Joe Lieberman. West Feliciana voters helped to re-elect George W. Bush and Dick Cheney in 2004, with 2,932 (56 percent) to 2,214 (42 percent) over Democratic candidates John Kerry and John Edwards. Republicans John McCain and Sarah Palin won the parish in 2008, but they lost the Presidential/Vice-Presidential contest to Democrats Barack Obama and Joe Biden.

== Geography ==
According to the U.S. Census Bureau, the parish has a total area of 426 square miles (1,100 km^{2}), of which 403 square miles (1,040 km^{2}) is land and 23 square miles (60 km^{2}) (5.3%) is water.

The parish is located on the Mississippi River, and is bordered by Pointe Coupee Parish to the west and East Feliciana Parish to the east. The parish is about 30 miles (48 km) north of Baton Rouge and about 60 miles (97 km) south of Natchez, Mississippi.

The area—including references to the loess soil and Louisiana State Penitentiary—was used by author Walker Percy as the setting for his last novel, The Thanatos Syndrome.

=== Major highways ===
- U.S. Highway 61
- Louisiana Highway 10
- Louisiana Highway 15
- Louisiana Highway 66
- Louisiana Highway 421
- Louisiana Highway 964
- Louisiana Highway 965
- Louisiana Highway 966
- Louisiana Highway 967
- Louisiana Highway 968
- Louisiana Highway 969
- Louisiana Highway 3190

=== Adjacent parishes and counties ===
- Wilkinson County, Mississippi (north)
- East Feliciana Parish (east)
- East Baton Rouge Parish (south)
- West Baton Rouge Parish (south)
- Pointe Coupee Parish (southwest)
- Avoyelles Parish (northwest)
- Concordia Parish (northwest)

=== National protected area ===
- Cat Island National Wildlife Refuge

== Communities ==
=== Town ===
- St. Francisville (parish seat and only municipality)

=== Unincorporated communities ===
- Louisiana State Penitentiary (Angola)
- Bains
- Tunica
- Wakefield

== Demographics ==
Historical population
Census	Pop.	Note	%±
1820	12,732		—
1830	8,629		−32.2%
1840	10,910		26.4%
1850	13,245		21.4%
1860	11,671		−11.9%
1870	10,499		−10.0%
1880	12,809		22.0%
1890	15,062		17.6%
1900	15,994		6.2%
1910	13,449		−15.9%
1920	12,303		−8.5%
1930	10,924		−11.2%
1940	11,720		7.3%
1950	10,169		−13.2%
1960	12,395		21.9%
1970	11,376		−8.2%
1980	12,186		7.1%
1990	12,915		6.0%
2000	15,111		17.0%
2010	15,625		3.4%
2020	15,310		−2.0%
2025 (est.)	15,134	▼	−1.1%
U.S. Decennial Census; 1790–1960 1900–1990; 1990–2000 2010

West Feliciana Parish, Louisiana – Racial and ethnic composition Note: the US Census treats Hispanic/Latino as an ethnic category. This table excludes Latinos from the racial categories and assigns them to a separate category. Hispanics/Latinos may be of any race.
Race / Ethnicity (NH = Non-Hispanic)	Pop 1980	Pop 1990	Pop 2000	Pop 2010	Pop 2020	% 1980	% 1990	% 2000	% 2010	% 2020
White alone (NH)	5,037	5,562	7,263	8,002	10,585	41.33%	43.07%	48.06%	51.21%	69.14%
Black or African American alone (NH)	6,914	7,090	7,575	7,235	3,589	56.74%	54.90%	50.13%	46.30%	23.44%
Native American or Alaska Native alone (NH)	17	42	30	20	95	0.14%	0.33%	0.20%	0.13%	0.62%
Asian alone (NH)	20	12	25	31	30	0.16%	0.09%	0.17%	0.20%	0.20%
Native Hawaiian or Pacific Islander alone (NH)	x	x	3	3	5	x	x	0.02%	0.02%	0.03%
Other race alone (NH)	2	6	1	7	32	0.02%	0.05%	0.01%	0.04%	0.21%
Mixed race or Multiracial (NH)	x	x	57	76	323	x	x	0.38%	0.49%	2.11%
Hispanic or Latino (any race)	196	203	157	251	651	1.61%	1.57%	1.04%	1.61%	4.25%
Total	12,186	12,915	15,111	15,625	15,310	100.00%	100.00%	100.00%	100.00%	100.00%

As of the 2020 United States census, there were 15,310 people, 3,869 households, and 2,497 families residing in the parish. The 2019 American Community Survey estimated 15,428 people lived in the parish, down from 15,625 at the 2010 United States census, and up from 15,111 at the 2000 U.S. census. Among the population, the median age was 41.4. In 2000, the parish the population was spread out, with 20.30% under the age of 18, 8.70% from 18 to 24, 40.00% from 25 to 44, 23.80% from 45 to 64, and 7.20% who were 65 years of age or older. The median age was 37 years. For every 100 females, there were 191.10 males. For every 100 females age 18 and over, there were 223.60 males.

The racial and ethnic makeup was 53.5% non-Hispanic White, 44.5% Black and African American, 0.2% American Indian and Alaska Native, 0.6% Asian alone, 0.1% some other race, 1.1% two or more races, and 1.2% Hispanic and Latin American of any race. In 2000, the racial makeup of the parish was 50.51% Black or African American, 48.63% White, 0.20% Native American, 0.17% Asian, 0.02% Pacific Islander, 0.03% from other races, and 0.44% from two or more races; 1.04% of the population were Hispanic or Latin American of any race.

In 2019, there were 3,869 households and 5,446 housing units. The parish had a home-ownership rate of 73.2%, and the median housing value was $229,500. Median gross rent was $785, and the median household income was $59,637. Approximately 23.6% of the population lived at or below the poverty line. At the 2000 census, the median income for a household in the parish was $39,667, and the median income for a family was $47,239. Males had a median income of $35,046 versus $21,922 for females. The per capita income for the parish was $16,201. About 15.00% of families and 19.90% of the population were below the poverty line, including 25.30% of those under age 18 and 23.40% of those age 65 or over.

In January 2007, the state of Louisiana estimated that 15,318 people lived in the parish, with 5,000 of them being prisoners at Louisiana State Penitentiary (Angola).

== Government and infrastructure ==
=== Parish government ===
West Feliciana Parish operates under a Home Rule Charter form of government, which replaced the former Police Jury system in 2013. Executive authority is vested in an elected Parish President, while legislative authority resides with a five-member Parish Council.

==== Executive leadership ====
- Kevin Couhig served as the parish's first Parish President from 2013 until his resignation in December 2018. Couhig oversaw the structural transition from the police jury governance model to the Home Rule Charter structure and initiated key economic development projects, including the establishment of the West Feliciana Parish Industrial Park.
- Kenny Havard, a former member of the Louisiana House of Representatives, was elected in November 2018 to succeed Couhig. Assuming office in 2019, Havard was re-elected to full terms in 2019 and 2023. His administration has focused on parish infrastructure development, commercial utility expansion, balanced fiscal budgeting, and local business recruitment.

Louisiana State Penitentiary of the Louisiana Department of Public Safety and Corrections is located in unincorporated West Feliciana Parish.

United States presidential election results for West Feliciana Parish, Louisiana
Year	Republican		Democratic		Third party(ies)	
Year	No.	%	No.	%	No.	%
1912	3	0.96%	281	89.49%	30	9.55%
1916	8	2.92%	261	95.26%	5	1.82%
1920	34	8.72%	356	91.28%	0	0.00%
1924	15	4.14%	347	95.86%	0	0.00%
1928	90	17.61%	421	82.39%	0	0.00%
1932	49	8.09%	557	91.91%	0	0.00%
1936	76	11.88%	564	88.13%	0	0.00%
1940	127	16.71%	633	83.29%	0	0.00%
1944	178	29.47%	426	70.53%	0	0.00%
1948	102	17.53%	101	17.35%	379	65.12%
1952	503	64.32%	279	35.68%	0	0.00%
1956	442	56.38%	296	37.76%	46	5.87%
1960	196	22.00%	271	30.42%	424	47.59%
1964	897	80.09%	223	19.91%	0	0.00%
1968	296	11.08%	1,303	48.76%	1,073	40.16%
1972	1,001	42.13%	1,079	45.41%	296	12.46%
1976	990	33.83%	1,890	64.59%	46	1.57%
1980	1,237	33.23%	2,341	62.90%	144	3.87%
1984	2,097	47.38%	2,296	51.88%	33	0.75%
1988	1,854	45.34%	2,146	52.48%	89	2.18%
1992	1,501	34.32%	2,328	53.22%	545	12.46%
1996	1,616	35.86%	2,416	53.62%	474	10.52%
2000	2,512	51.69%	2,187	45.00%	161	3.31%
2004	2,932	56.19%	2,214	42.43%	72	1.38%
2008	3,150	56.05%	2,415	42.97%	55	0.98%
2012	3,257	56.38%	2,441	42.25%	79	1.37%
2016	3,390	58.46%	2,248	38.77%	161	2.78%
2020	3,863	61.63%	2,298	36.66%	107	1.71%
2024	3,923	65.30%	2,004	33.36%	81	1.35%

== Education ==
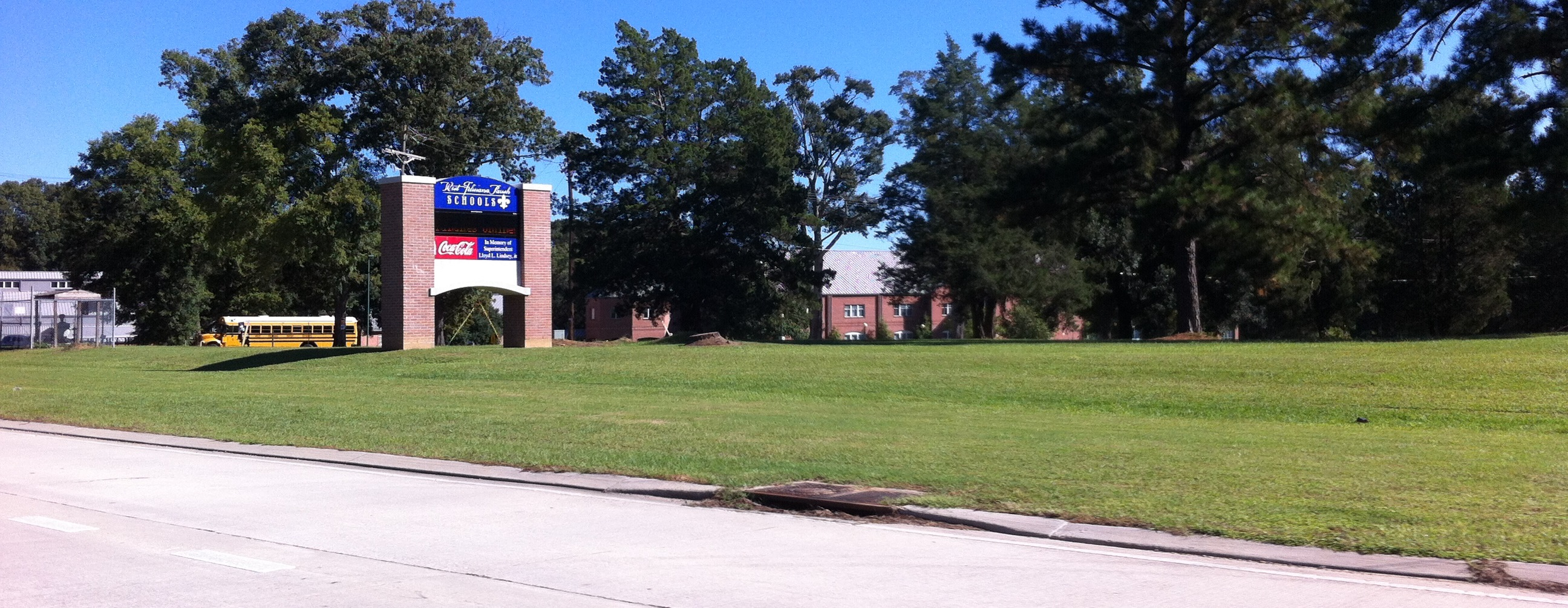
The entrance to the West Feliciana Parish Public Schools schools complex in Bains

West Feliciana Parish Public Schools serves the parish. All residents are zoned to Bains Lower Elementary School, Bains Elementary School, West Feliciana Middle School, and West Feliciana High School. Tunica Elementary School, a parish elementary school, was closed after the parish school board voted to close the school in May 2011.

Some students in the parish attend Wilkinson County Christian Academy in Wilkinson County, Mississippi.

The West Feliciana Parish Library is located in St. Francisville. The library, previously a part of the Audubon Regional Library System, became independent in January 2004.

The parish's proximity to Baton Rouge offers access to Louisiana State University, Southern University, and Baton Rouge Community College. It is in the service area of Baton Rouge Community College.

== News media ==
Founded in 1892, the St. Francisville Democrat was the parish's local newspaper and served as the official journal for the parish's governmental bodies. The paper, founded by W. W. Leake and his wife May, was originally called "The True Democrat." Over the years others continued publication of the newspaper. On October 1, 2014, the Democrat was sold by Louisiana State Newspapers to Capital City Press Inc., owner of The Advocate (a major newspaper of Baton Rouge) and of other newspapers in the region.

Founded in 1976, The Angolite is a news magazine created and published at the Louisiana State Penitentiary. Each year, it publishes six issues.

== Notable people ==
- General Robert Hilliard Barrow, the 27th Commandant of the United States Marine Corps (USMC) from 1979 to 1983.
- Cheston Folkes, Louisiana state representative from West Feliciana Parish, 1908–1920, 1924–1932, and 1936–1940
- John Richard Rarick, attorney and U.S. Representative from St. Francisville.
- Sheadrick Turner (1869–1927), Illinois state representative, newspaper editor, and lawyer

== See also ==
- Louisiana State Penitentiary
- National Register of Historic Places listings in West Feliciana Parish, Louisiana
- River Bend Nuclear Generating Station
- Louisville, New Orleans and Texas Railway – West Feliciana Railway
