= Hattie Moseley Austin =

African-American restaurateur

- Born: c. 1900; Saint Francisville, Louisiana, U.S.
- Died: 1998 (aged 97–98)
- Spouses: Willie Moseley (before 1971): Bill Austin
- Culinary career
- Cooking style: Southern cuisine Cuisine of New Orleans
- Current restaurant(s): Hattie's Chicken Shack

Hattie Moseley Austin (c. 1900—April 23, 1998) was an American chef and restaurateur. She was the founder-owner-chef of Hattie's Chicken Shack in Saratoga Springs, New York.

== Early life and personal background ==
Hattie Moseley Austin, born Hattie Gray around 1900 in Saint Francisville, Louisiana, lost her mother Lydia during childbirth. Raised by her father, Harry, she received additional support from Hattie Leopold, the wife of a local rabbi who had employed Lydia. In honor of her, Hattie was named after Mrs. Leopold.

She later moved to New Orleans for school and then to Chicago, where she worked as a cook for A.E. Staley, founder of the Staley corn processing company. The Staleys maintained homes in Chicago, Miami, and Saratoga Springs, and Hattie traveled with them between cities. This experience exposed her to various social environments and helped shape the inclusive, welcoming spirit that would define her future restaurant.

Hattie was married twice—first to Willie Moseley, and after his death in 1971, to Bill Austin.

Her Southern upbringing influenced her cooking style, especially her iconic fried chicken, which became a symbol of her culinary legacy.

== Founding of Hattie's Chicken Shack ==
In 1938, Hattie settled permanently in Saratoga Springs and opened Hattie’s Chicken Shack on Federal Street with a $33 investment. Located in a racially mixed neighborhood, the restaurant served her signature fried chicken alongside New Orleans-inspired dishes like shrimp, scallops, and barbecue.

Saratoga Springs at the time was known for its vibrant nightlife, especially during the summer racing season. Hattie ran her restaurant 24/7 during these peak months, serving a diverse clientele—from wealthy gamblers to backstretch workers from the Saratoga Race Course. Hattie was well-known for feeding anyone who was hungry, regardless of their ability to pay.

The restaurant remained on Federal Street until 1968 when urban renewal efforts destroyed the neighborhood. Hattie then moved the restaurant to Phila Street, where it still operates today. She sold the business in 1993.

== See also ==
- A. E. Staley
