= Cheston Folkes =

American politician

Louisiana State Representative for West Feliciana Parish
- In office 1908–1920
- Preceded by: W. L. Stirling
- Succeeded by: W. L. Stirling
- In office 1924–1932
- Preceded by: W. L. Stirling
- Succeeded by: George M. Lester
- In office 1936–1940
- Preceded by: George M. Lester
- Succeeded by: Thomas D. Gilmore

Personal details
- Born: September 27, 1863 Louisiana, U.S.
- Died: June 10, 1941 (aged 77)
- Resting place: Grace Episcopal Church Cemetery in St. Francisville
- Spouse: Jessie Davis Folkes (married 1888-1938, her death)
- Children: 7
- Occupation: Farmer

Cheston Folkes (September 27, 1863 – June 10, 1941) was a farmer from St. Francisville, Louisiana, who served in the Louisiana House of Representatives for West Feliciana Parish in three nonconsecutive stints from 1908 to 1920, 1924 to 1932, and 1936 to 1940.

His son, Warren Davis Folkes of St. Francisville, also served in the state House, nonconsecutively, from 1944 to 1955 and 1968 to 1976, and in the Louisiana State Senate from 1955 to 1968.

| Preceded by W. L. Stirling | Louisiana State Representative for West Feliciana Parish; 1908–1920 | Succeeded by W. L. Stirling |
| Preceded by W. L. Stirling | Louisiana State Representative for West Feliciana Parish; 1924–1932 | Succeeded by George M. Lester |
| Preceded by George M. Lester | Louisiana State Representative for West Feliciana Parish; 1936–1940 | Succeeded by Thomas D. Gilmore |
