= Chandler Brewer =

American football player (born 1997)

Profile
- Position: Offensive tackle

Personal information
- Born: June 12, 1997 (age 29); Florence, Alabama, U.S.
- Listed height: 6 ft 6 in (1.98 m)
- Listed weight: 320 lb (145 kg)

Career information
- High school: Florence
- College: Middle Tennessee (2015–2018)
- NFL draft: 2019: undrafted

Career history
- Los Angeles Rams (2019–2022); Jacksonville Jaguars (2023); New Orleans Saints (2024)*; Tennessee Titans (2024–2025)
- * Offseason or practice squad member only

Awards and highlights
- Super Bowl champion (LVI); First-team All-Conference USA (2018); Third-team All-Conference USA (2017)

Career NFL statistics
- Games played: 15
- Games started: 4
- Stats at Pro Football Reference

Chandler Wade Brewer (born June 12, 1997) is an American professional football offensive tackle. He played college football for the Middle Tennessee Blue Raiders, and has previously played in the NFL for the Los Angeles Rams and Jacksonville Jaguars.

== College career ==
Brewer was a member of the Middle Tennessee Blue Raiders for four seasons, playing in 52 games. As a senior, he started all 14 of Middle Tennessee's games and was named first-team All-Conference USA. Following the end of the season, he announced that he had been diagnosed with non-Hodgkin lymphoma during the summer going into his senior year and had to undergo radiation treatment in-between games.

== Professional career ==
Pre-draft measurables
Height	Weight	Arm length	Hand span	40-yard dash	10-yard split	20-yard split	20-yard shuttle	Three-cone drill	Vertical jump	Broad jump	Bench press
6 ft 5 1/4 in (1.96 m)	320 lb (145 kg)	34 1/4 in (0.87 m)	10 1/8 in (0.26 m)	5.13 s	1.84 s	2.94 s	4.82 s	7.75 s	26.5 in (0.67 m)	8 ft 9 in (2.67 m)	34 reps
All values from Pro Day

=== Los Angeles Rams ===
Brewer signed with the Los Angeles Rams as an undrafted free agent on April 27, 2019. Brewer was waived at the end of training camp during final roster cuts, but was re-signed by the Rams to their practice squad on September 1. Brewer was promoted to the Rams' active roster on November 13. Brewer made his NFL debut on November 17, against the Chicago Bears. Brewer played in seven games during his rookie season.

Brewer exercised his option to opt-out of the 2020 season due to the COVID-19 pandemic on July 31, 2020.

On August 31, 2021, Brewer was waived by the Rams and re-signed to the practice squad the next day. Brewer won his first Super Bowl ring when the Rams defeated the Cincinnati Bengals in Super Bowl LVI.

On February 15, 2022, Brewer signed a reserve/future contract with the Rams. He was waived on August 30, and was re-signed to the practice squad the next day. He was elevated to the active roster on October 3, via a standard elevation which caused him to revert back to the practice squad after the game. He was promoted to the active roster on November 5. Brewer was placed on injured reserve eleven days later with an MCL sprain. He was activated on December 31. Brewer played six games during the 2022 season, including four starts.

=== Jacksonville Jaguars ===
On April 5, 2023, Brewer signed a contract with the Jacksonville Jaguars. He was released on August 29, and re-signed to the practice squad. Brewer was signed to the active roster on November 27, and played in the team's Week 14 game. Brewer was waived on December 30 and re-signed to the practice squad. He signed a reserve/future contract with Jacksonville on January 8, 2024. On June 14, Brewer was placed on injured reserve with an undisclosed injury, then released a month later.

=== New Orleans Saints ===
On July 27, 2024, Brewer signed with the New Orleans Saints. He was waived with an injury designation on August 6.

=== Tennessee Titans ===
On November 12, 2024, Brewer was signed to the Tennessee Titans practice squad, and played one game during the 2024 season as a gameday elevation. He signed a reserve/future contract with Tennessee on January 6, 2025. On August 7, Brewer was placed on injured reserve and subsequently released by the Titans on August 14.

On November 25, 2025, Brewer was re-signed to the Titans' practice squad.
