= Isaac D. Smith =

United States Army general

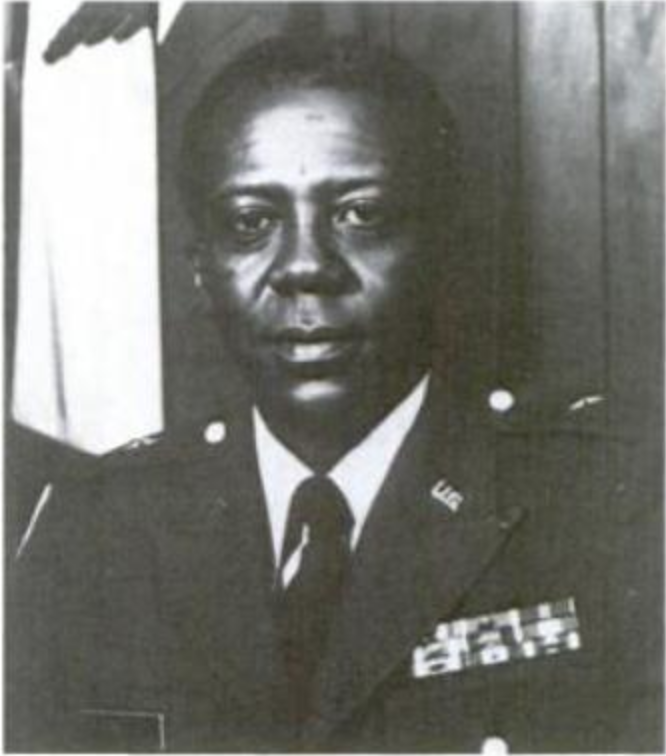
- Smith pictured as a brigadier general
- Born: 2 May 1932 (age 94); Wakefield, Louisiana, U.S.
- Military career
- Allegiance: United States
- Branch: United States Army
- Service years: 1950s–1989
- Rank: Major general

Isaac D. Smith (born 2 May 1932) was a major general in the United States Army.

== Education ==
Smith was in the Reserve Officers Training Corps at Southern University and A&M College, where he earned a B.S. in Agriculture. He also earned a Masters in Public Administration from Shippensburg State College. He also completed several military education courses and attended the U.S. Army War College.

== Assignments ==
According to The Rocks, inc., website:

He has held a wide variety of important command and staff positions to include Deputy Chief of Staff, Personnel, U.S. Army, Europe and Seventh Army; Deputy Chief of Staff for Operations and Intelligence, Allied Forces Central Europe; Chief, Doctrine and Systems Integration Division, Requirements Directorate, Office of the Deputy Chief of Staff for Operations and Plans, U.S. Army, Washington, D.C.; Chief, Reserve Forces Division, Office of the Assistant Secretary of the Army (Manpower and Reserve Affairs), Washington, D.C.; Commanding General, U.S. Army Second Reserve Officer Training Corps Region, Fort Knox, Kentucky; and Assistant Division Commander, 1st Armored Division, U.S. Army Europe.

— The Rocks, Inc.

In 1983, when Smith was a Brigadier general, The Crisis named him one of the "top blacks in the Armed Forces." At the time, he held the same rank as Colin Powell. He was noted in Blacks in American armed forces: 1776-1983, as well as African American generals and flag officers.

Smith was the author of a major Army report on THE DEPENDENTS SCHOOLS SYSTEM IN USAREUR, about the education of "army brats" in Europe.

== Awards ==
Smith won several DOD awards and decorations including the Distinguished Service Medal, the Silver Star, Defense Superior Service Medal, the Legion of Merit (with Oak Leaf Cluster), Bronze Star Medal, the Meritorious Service Medal (with Oak Leaf Cluster), and the Army Commendation Medal (with two Oak Leaf Clusters).

In 1999, Smith was named "Rock of the Year" by The Rocks, Inc., an association of ROTC officers.

In 2006, Smith, by then a retired major general, received a citation from the Louisiana House of Representatives for his service to the United States, which was also passed by the Louisiana Senate.
