= Bains, Louisiana =

Bains
- Unincorporated community
- Location within the state of Louisiana
- Coordinates: 30°49′51″N 91°23′12″W
- Country: United States
- State: Louisiana
- Parish: West Feliciana
- Elevation: 187 ft (57 m)
- Time zone: UTC-6 (Central (CST))
  - Summer (DST): UTC-5 (CDT)
- GNIS feature ID: 532281

Bains is an unincorporated community in West Feliciana Parish, Louisiana, United States. Its elevation is 187 feet (57 m).

== History ==
Bains was named for Dr. Henry Bains, a plantation owner.

== Education ==
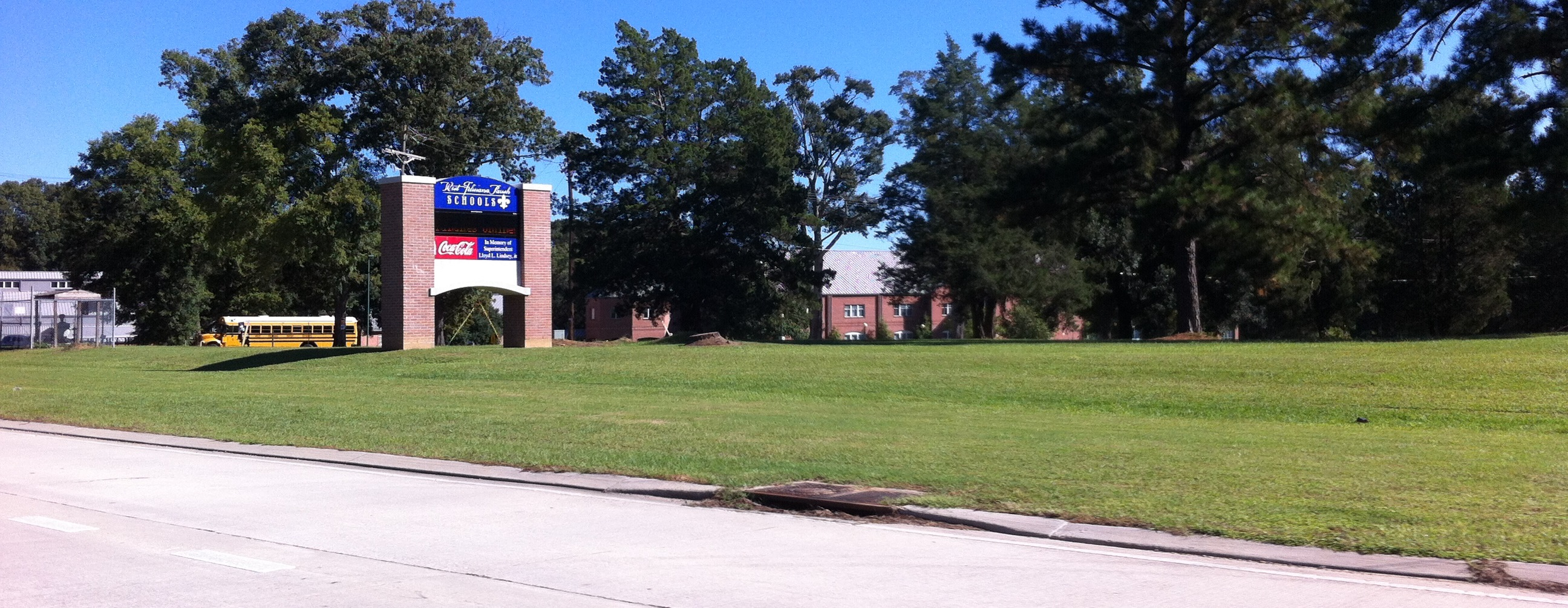
The entrance to the West Feliciana Parish Public Schools schools complex in Bains

Residents are zoned to West Feliciana Parish Public Schools. Elementary school children attend Bains Lower Elementary School and Bains Elementary School in Bains. Secondary schools serving Bains are West Feliciana Middle School and West Feliciana High School in Bains.

The West Feliciana Parish Library is located in St. Francisville. The library, previously a part of the Audubon Regional Library System, became independent in January 2004.

West Feliciana Parish is in the service area of Baton Rouge Community College.
