= USS Hart (DD-110) =

Wickes-class destroyer

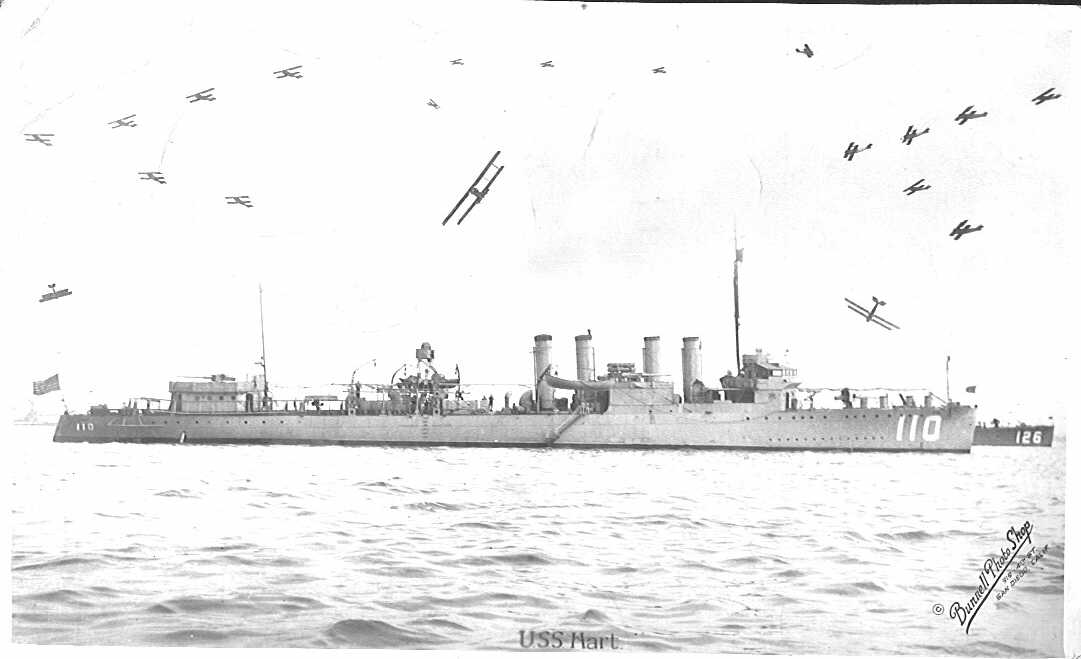
- USS Hart (DD-110)

History

United States
- Namesake: Ezekiel Hart and John E. Hart
- Builder: Union Iron Works, San Francisco, California
- Laid down: 8 January 1918
- Launched: 4 July 1918
- Commissioned: 26 May 1919
- Decommissioned: 1 June 1931
- Reclassified: 17 July 1920, DM-8.
- Stricken: 11 November 1931
- Fate: Sold for scrap, 25 February 1932

General characteristics
- Class & type: Wickes-class destroyer
- Displacement: 1,202–1,208 long tons (1,221–1,227 t) (standard); 1,295–1,322 long tons (1,316–1,343 t) (deep load)
- Length: 314 ft 4 in (95.8 m)
- Beam: 30 ft 11 in (9.42 m)
- Draught: 9 ft 10 in (3.0 m)
- Installed power: 27,000 shp (20,000 kW); 4 water-tube boilers
- Propulsion: 2 shafts, 2 steam turbines
- Speed: 35 knots (65 km/h; 40 mph) (design)
- Range: 2,500 nautical miles (4,600 km; 2,900 mi) at 20 knots (37 km/h; 23 mph) (design)
- Complement: 6 officers, 108 enlisted men
- Armament: 4 × single 4-inch (102 mm) guns; 2 × single 1-pounder AA guns; 4 × triple 21 inch (533 mm) torpedo tubes; 2 × depth charge rails

USS Hart (DD-110) was a Wickes-class destroyer built for the United States Navy during World War I.

== Namesakes ==
Ezekiel Bishop Hart was born c. 1795. He entered the Navy as a Midshipman on 30 April 1814. He was killed in the action of Commodore Isaac Chauncey's squadron on Lake Ontario on 26 August 1814.

John E. Hart was appointed a Midshipman on 23 February 1841. He served on various ships of the fleet, and was appointed Lieutenant Commander in July 1862. Commanding USS Albatross, Hart served in the West Gulf Blockading Squadron during the American Civil War and engaged two Confederate steamers in the Red River near Fort DeRussy on 4 May 1863. He died of fever contracted on duty on the Mississippi River on 11 June 1863.

== Description ==
The Wickes class was an improved and faster version of the preceding Caldwell-class. Two different designs were prepared to the same specification that mainly differed in the turbines and boilers used. The ships built to the Bethlehem Steel design, built in the Fore River and Union Iron Works shipyards, mostly used Yarrow boilers that deteriorated badly during service and were mostly scrapped during the 1930s. The ships displaced 1,202–1,208 long tons (1,221–1,227 t) at standard load and 1,295–1,322 long tons (1,316–1,343 t) at deep load. They had an overall length of 314 feet 4 inches (95.8 m), a beam of 30 feet 11 inches (9.4 m) and a draught of 9 feet 10 inches (3.0 m). They had a crew of 6 officers and 108 enlisted men.

Performance differed radically between the ships of the class, often due to poor workmanship. The Wickes class was powered by two steam turbines, each driving one propeller shaft, using steam provided by four water-tube boilers. The turbines were designed to produce a total of 27,000 shaft horsepower (20,000 kW) intended to reach a speed of 35 knots (65 km/h; 40 mph). The ships carried 225 long tons (229 t) of fuel oil which was intended gave them a range of 2,500 nautical miles (4,600 km; 2,900 mi) at 20 knots (37 km/h; 23 mph).

The ships were armed with four 4-inch (102 mm) guns in single mounts and were fitted with two 1-pounder guns for anti-aircraft defense. Their primary weapon, though, was their torpedo battery of a dozen 21 inch (533 mm) torpedo tubes in four triple mounts. In many ships a shortage of 1-pounders caused them to be replaced by 3-inch (76 mm) anti-aircraft (AA) guns. They also carried a pair of depth charge rails. A "Y-gun" depth charge thrower was added to many ships.

== Construction and career ==
Hart, named in honor of Ezekiel Hart and John E. Hart, was launched 4 July 1918; by Union Iron Works of San Francisco, California, sponsored by Mrs. Daniel C. Nutting; and commissioned 26 May 1919. Hart joined the destroyer force and operated off the California coast until 17 July 1920, when she was reclassified as a light minelayer, DM-8, and proceeded to Mare Island Navy Yard for installation of minelaying equipment. Following her conversion, Hart was assigned to Mine Detachment, Asiatic Fleet, and sailed for the Philippine Islands in November 1920. She subsequently operated in waters off the Philippine Islands and China in peacetime operations.

Ordered to San Diego, California, for deactivation, Hart sailed from Manila, 12 December 1930 and arrived at San Diego 24 January 1931. She decommissioned 1 June 1931, and her name was struck from the Navy List 11 November. Hart was sold for scrap 25 February 1932 in accordance with the London Treaty for the limitation of naval armaments.
