= West Feliciana Parish Public Schools =

School district in Louisiana, United States

West Feliciana High School
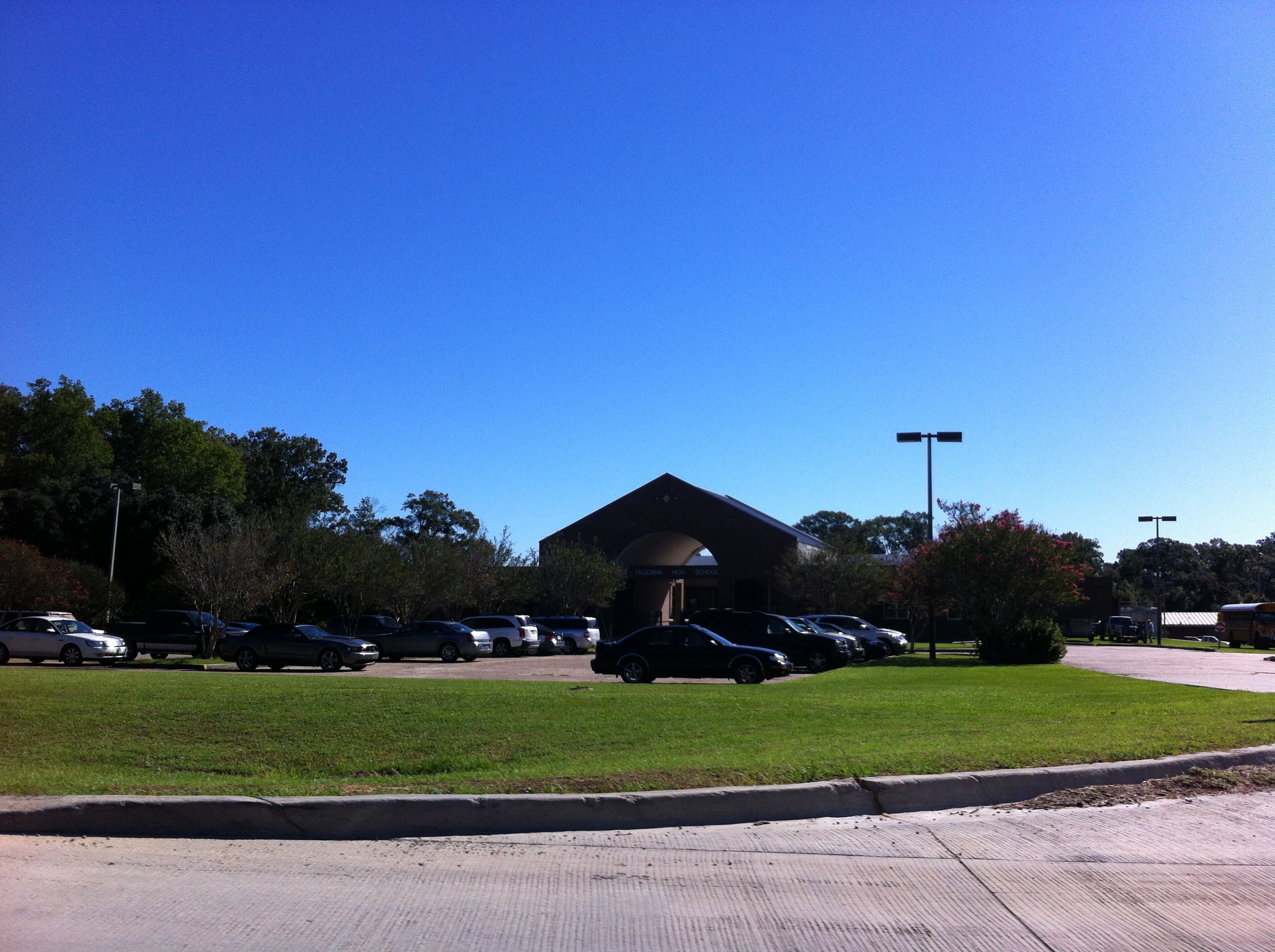

Location
- 8604 U.S. Highway 61; St. Francisville, (West Feliciana Parish), Louisiana 70775; United States; 30.826292°N 91.384202°W

Information
- Type: Public high school
- Principal: Karolyn Taylor
- Staff: 41.13 (FTE)
- Enrollment: 615 (2023-24)
- Student to teacher ratio: 14.95
- Colors: Royal blue and white
- Nickname: Saints
- Website: West Feliciana High School

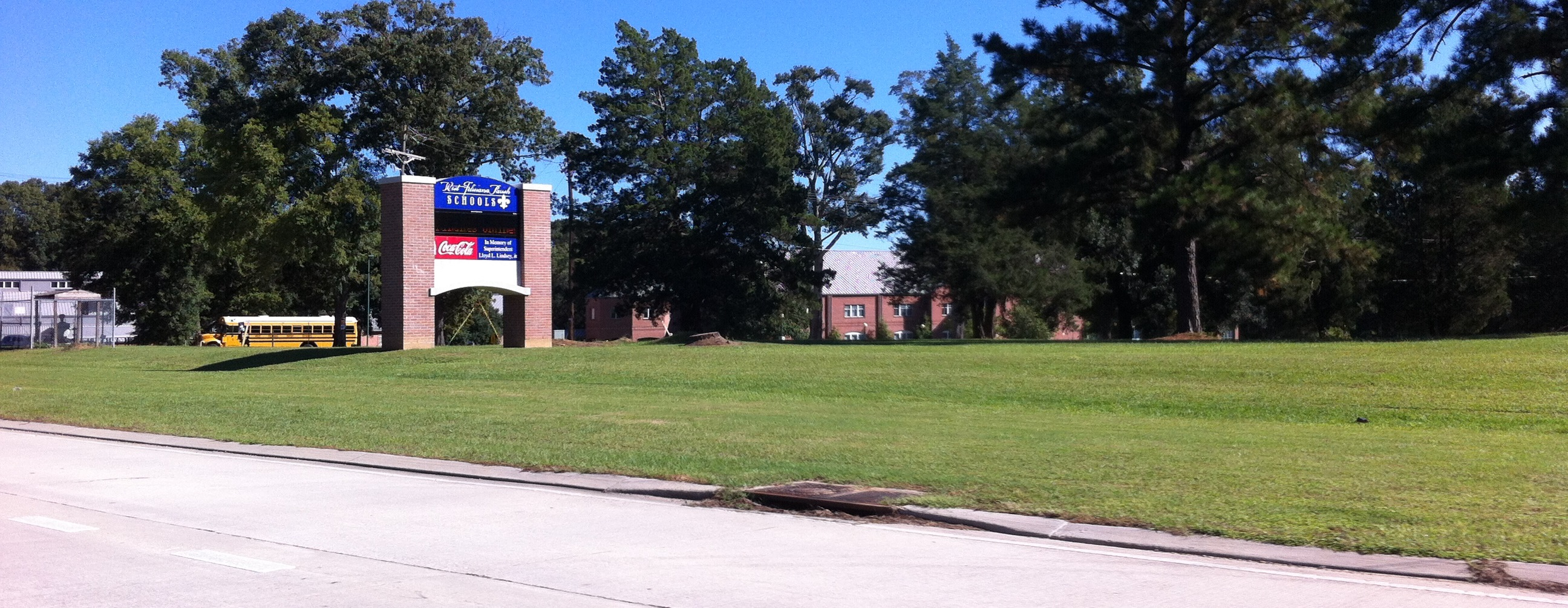
The entrance to the West Feliciana schools complex in Bains

West Feliciana Parish Public Schools (WFPPS) or West Feliciana Parish School Board (WFPSB) is a school district headquartered in St. Francisville, Louisiana, United States.

The district serves residents of West Feliciana Parish, including St. Francisville, Bains, Tunica, Wakefield, and the residences of the Louisiana State Penitentiary (Angola).

As of 2012 it was the school district in Louisiana with the third-highest level of academic performance, after the Zachary Community School Board and the New Orleans Public Schools campuses not within the Recovery School District.

== School uniforms ==
All WFPPS schools have mandatory school uniforms.

== Schools ==
All of the schools are located in unincorporated areas.

Secondary schools

- West Feliciana High School (Bains)
- West Feliciana Middle (Bains)
  - The newest school, WFMS opened in 1999. Upon opening it was accredited by the Southern Association of Colleges and Schools.

Primary schools

- 2nd Grade-5th Grade: Bains Elementary School (Bains)
  - The school is adjacent to Bains Lower Elementary. It is 13 miles (21 km) south of the Tunica Elementary School building in Tunica.
- Preschool-1st Grade: Bains Lower Elementary School (Bains)

Former schools

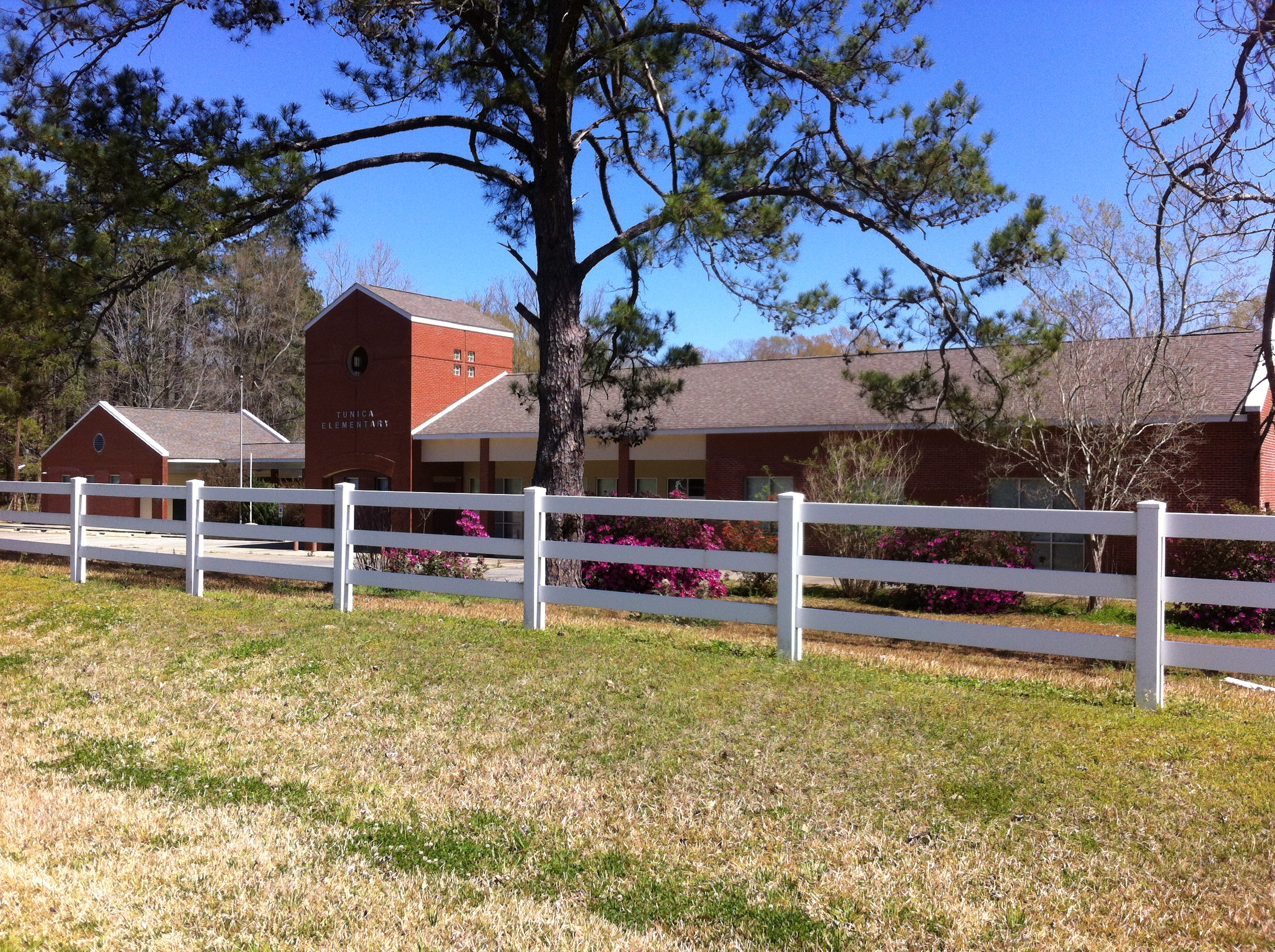
Tunica Elementary School

- Preschool-5th Grade: Tunica Elementary School (Tunica)
  - The Tunica Elementary building is in proximity to the Louisiana State Penitentiary (LSP), being 4 miles (6.4 km) from the facility. During its life about 125 students attended the school. Before its closure, it had 110 students. Many Tunica Elementary students lived on the premises of LSP. On May 18, 2011, due to budget cuts, the parish school board voted to close Tunica Elementary.
