= John E. Hart =

John Elliot Hart
- Born: April 4, 1824; New York City, New York
- Died: June 11, 1863 (aged 39); St. Francisville, Louisiana
- Occupation: Union Navy Officer

John Elliot Hart (April 4, 1824 – June 11, 1863) was an officer in the Union Navy during the American Civil War. He died in June 1863 on board his ship USS Albatross while taking part in the Union attempt to blockade the Mississippi River. He is best known for the unusual circumstances of his burial in Louisiana, which the town of St. Francisville, Louisiana, commemorates every year in a three-day festival called "The Day the War Stopped."

== Early life ==
Hart was born in 1824 in New York City to a family with 200-year roots there. His father was Benjamin Franklin Hart and his mother was Sarah Ann Copp. The family had a strong Navy tradition. His grandfather John Elliot Copp, for whom he was named, and his uncle Ezekiel Bishop Hart were both killed serving in the Navy during the War of 1812.

He moved to Schenectady, New York, in the 1850s, and in 1855 he married Harriet "Hattie" Van Vorst, the mayor's daughter. They had one surviving child, Abraham Elliot Hart, as well as a son and daughter who died in infancy. In 1857 he joined the local Masonic lodge and rose to the rank of Master.

== Naval career ==
Hart was appointed a midshipman in the Navy on February 2, 1841. He served in the Brazil Squadron aboard USS Marion and USS John Adams, and in 1846 he circumnavigated the globe aboard USS Constitution. In late 1846 he was admitted to the newly opened United States Naval Academy and graduated as a Passed Midshipman in the class of 1847.

He served on various ships including USS St. Lawrence, USS Michigan, and USS Jamestown. While serving on Jamestown he was promoted to Lieutenant. He took a leave of absence in the late 1850s, then served in the Mediterranean aboard USS Iroquois.

Following the outbreak of the Civil War he served aboard USS Vincennes, and was part of the West Gulf Blockading Squadron on the Mississippi River under Admiral David Farragut. He was appointed a Lieutenant Commander on July 16, 1862. In August 1862 he was transferred to the gunship USS Albatross, and in October 1862 he was put in command of Albatross when the captain was relieved of his post. The Albatross and other ships engaged two Confederate steamers in the Red River near Fort DeRussey on May 4, 1863. It was later claimed that Albatross had shelled St. Francisville under Hart's command, but no such incident can be found in the ship's log, and the historic shelling of St. Francisville actually took place in January 1864, six months after his death.

== Death and burial ==
In June 1863, while Albatross was stationed above Port Hudson, Louisiana, he contracted yellow fever. A few days later he became delusional, and on June 11, 1863, he committed suicide in his cabin with his own revolver. He was officially listed as "killed in battle."

His officers were unable to send his body home to Schenectady for burial, and knowing he would wish a Masonic burial, Executive Officer Theodore B. Dubois went ashore under a flag of truce to ask if there were any Masons in the area who would conduct a funeral. They were put in contact with Confederate Army Captain William Walter Leake, a company commander with the 1st Louisiana Cavalry, who was home on furlough. Leake was Senior Warden of Feliciana Lodge No. 31 in the nearby town of St. Francisville, and he made arrangements for Hart to be buried at Grace Episcopal Church there. A truce was arranged so that the Union officers could bring his body ashore, attend the funeral, and return to their ship to resume their blockade. A joint party of Union and Confederate officers, all Masons, participated in the funeral on June 12, 1863. The pastor of Grace Church, Rev. Daniel S. Lewis, conducted an Episcopal service, and Leake as acting Master of the lodge led the Masonic service.

Leake, who later became Master of the St. Francisville lodge, maintained Hart's grave and decorated it with flowers for the next 49 years, until his own death in 1912. Leake was buried near Hart, and the two former enemies are commemorated with a single marble slab, placed in 1955 by the Grand Lodge of the State of Louisiana and "dedicated to the universality of Freemasonry."

In 1906 Hart's son Abraham Elliot Hart, who had been 7 when his father died, learned from his mother about his father's burial by a Confederate officer. The son, who went by the name A. Elliot Hart, wrote to Leake, who still lived in St. Francisville, to thank him for his service to his fallen father. He said he had only then learned about it and that Leake's kindness had made a profound impression on him.

Frank Karwowski, the historian of the Masonic lodge in Schenectady, became interested in the story and began researching it. In 1999 he and the St. Francisville lodge cooperated in staging a reenactment of the truce and burial, billed as "The Day the War Stopped;" the tradition has been continued annually in June ever since. It is now a three-day festival with lectures and a parade in addition to the re-enactments. Karwowski himself plays Hart for a talk on Friday night and Hart's second-in-command Dubois for the funeral re-enactment on Saturday. Members of the St. Francisville lodge portray Leake; past portrayers have included a U.S. Congressman and Leake's great-great-grandson. During the 2000s Karwowski began to contact descendants of Hart and Leake, inviting them to attend the re-enactment weekend, and several have done so, particularly in 2013 for the 150th anniversary of the event.

== Namesake ==
USS Hart (DD-110) was named for him and his uncle Ezekiel B. Hart.
