= E. M. Toler =

Enoch McLain Toler (1874–1954) was a doctor and politician in Louisiana. He served eight years in the Louisiana House of Representatives for East Feliciana Parish. He then represented East Feliciana and West Feliciana Parishes for 10 years in the Louisiana Senate.

He was a medical doctor in Clinton, Louisiana. His son Enoch McLain Toler II became doctor.
