= William Walter Leake =

American politician

- Born: April 22, 1833; West Feliciana Parish, Louisiana, US
- Died: January 20, 1912 (aged 78); St. Francisville, Louisiana, US
- Occupation: attorney
- Known for: Confederate Army officer
- Spouse: Margaret Mumford
- Children: 11
- Military career
- Allegiance: Confederate States of America
- Branch: Confederate States Army
- Rank: Captain
- Unit: 1st Louisiana Cavalry
- Conflicts: American Civil War

William Walter Leake (April 22, 1833 – January 20, 1912) was an officer in the Confederate States Army in the American Civil War. He was also an attorney, a member of the Louisiana State Senate, a circuit court judge, a bank president, and a newspaper publisher. He is best known for his role in burying a Union Navy officer in Louisiana, an event now commemorated as "The Day the War Stopped".

== Early life and education ==
Leake was born April 22, 1833, in West Feliciana Parish, Louisiana. He attended Kentucky Military Institute and Centenary College of Louisiana. He then studied law and was admitted to the bar in 1857. He went into practice in St. Francisville, Louisiana. He became a Freemason in 1854, joining Feliciana Lodge No. 31.

== Civil War ==
When war broke out in April 1861 Leake volunteered and was commissioned a captain. In September 1861 he was named captain of Company C of the First Louisiana Cavalry Regiment under Col. John Simms Scott. The regiment took part in various engagements, including the Battle of Shiloh in April 1862, where they were part of the cavalry forces under General Nathan Bedford Forrest. After a poorly managed river crossing and other incidents, the regiment's officers questioned Scott's leadership, accusing him of incompetence and reckless endangerment of his men. In May 1862 nine company commanders went to General P. G. T. Beauregard's headquarters and resigned their commissions. Beauregard refused to accept their resignations and had them arrested for "abandoning their commands in the face of the enemy". They were later ordered to report back to the First Louisiana Cavalry. In October 1862 Leake again resigned his commission and returned home to St. Francisville, where he was commissioned a captain in the Third Battalion, State Guard, Louisiana Cavalry. He subsequently raised another company of cavalry that served as part of Cochrane's Brigade in the Army of Tennessee until the end of the war.

== Post-war career ==
Following the war Leake returned to his law practice in St. Francisville. He served in the Louisiana State Senate from 1880 to 1882, and was a member of the Louisiana Constitutional Convention in 1882. From 1896 to 1904 he served as a circuit court judge. From 1906 until his death in 1912 he served as president of the People's Bank in St. Francisville. Leake and his wife May founded the local newspaper, the True Democrat (now the St. Francisville Democrat), in 1892.

== "The day the war stopped" ==
In June 1863, while Leake was home on furlough, a Union navy commander who was part of the West Gulf Blockading Squadron on the Mississippi River near St. Francisville died on board his ship. (Decades later a story developed that the ship had been shelling St. Francisville, but no such record can be found in the ship's log, and the historic shelling of St. Francisville actually took place in January 1864.) The officer, John E. Hart, was a Mason, and his second officer went ashore under flag of truce to ask if there were any Masons in the area who would conduct a funeral. He was directed to Leake, who was then senior warden in the St. Francisville Masonic lodge. Leake made arrangements for Hart to be buried at Grace Episcopal Church there. A truce was arranged so that the Union officers could bring his body ashore, attend the funeral, and return to their ship to resume their blockade. A joint party of Union and Confederate officers, all Masons, participated in the funeral on June 12, 1863. The pastor of Grace Church, Rev. Daniel S. Lewis, conducted an Episcopal service, and Leake as acting master of the lodge led the Masonic service.

For the rest of his life Leake, who later became Master of the lodge, tended Hart's grave and decorated it with flowers. Leake was buried near Hart, and the two former enemies (who never met in life) are commemorated with a single marble slab, placed in 1955 by the Grand Lodge of the state of Louisiana and "dedicated to the universality of Freemasonry." Since 1999 there has been an annual commemoration and re-enactment of the incident, sponsored jointly by the St. Francisville Masonic lodge and Hart's home lodge in Schenectady, New York, and attended by descendants of both men. During the re-enactment, members of the St. Francisville lodge portray Leake; past portrayers have included a U.S. Congressman and Leake's great-great-grandson.

== Personal ==
He married Margaret Mumford on December 10, 1857. They had eleven children.

He died January 20, 1912.
