= St. Francisville, Louisiana =

St. Francisville
- Town
- Town of St. Francisville
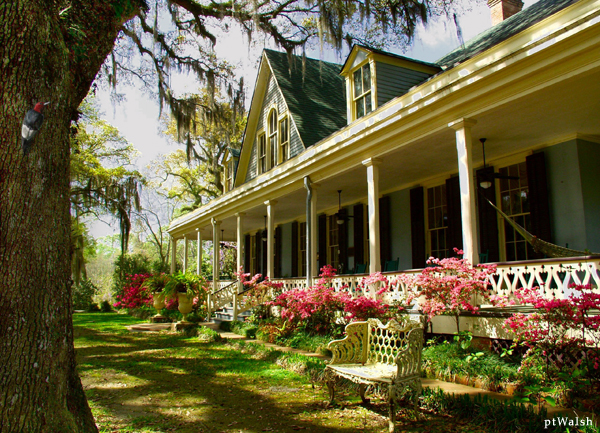
- One of several former plantation houses near St. Francisville

- Location of St. Francisville in West Feliciana Parish, Louisiana.

- Location of Louisiana in the United States
- Coordinates: 30°47′05″N 91°22′50″W
- Country: United States
- State: Louisiana
- Parish: West Feliciana
- Established: 1807

Government
  - Mayor: Andrew D’Aquilla

Area
  - Total: 1.84 sq mi (4.77 km^{2})
  - Land: 1.83 sq mi (4.73 km^{2})
  - Water: 0.019 sq mi (0.05 km^{2})
- Elevation: 148 ft (45 m)

Population (2020)
  - Total: 1,557
  - Density: 852.9/sq mi (329.32/km^{2})
- Time zone: UTC-6 (CST)
  - Summer (DST): UTC-5 (CDT)
- ZIP Code: 70775
- Area code: 225
- FIPS code: 22-67215
- GNIS feature ID: 2407267
- Website: stfrancisville.net

St. Francisville is a town in and the parish seat of West Feliciana Parish, Louisiana, United States. The population was 1,557 at the 2020 census. It is part of the Baton Rouge metropolitan statistical area.

== History ==
The current town of St. Francisville was established on May 11, 1807, by John H. Johnson, and was originally known as the Villa of St. Francis. A number of historic structures from that period still exist. Called "the town two miles long and two yards wide" because it was developed atop a narrow ridge overlooking the Mississippi River, it was the commercial and cultural center of the surrounding plantation country. Below St. Francisville's bluffs, another early settlement called Bayou Sara had been established by French colonists in the early 1790s. It was at one time the largest antebellum Mississippi River port between New Orleans and Memphis, but was superseded by Natchez. The settlement was gradually destroyed by repeated flooding and fires, and nothing exists of Bayou Sara today. A few of its surviving structures were hauled up the hill into St. Francisville in the 1920s. This area and other former French-controlled territories east of the Mississippi River was taken over by Great Britain after it defeated France in the Seven Years' War in 1763.

At the end of the American Revolutionary War, Great Britain ceded what it called West Florida to Spain in 1783, as part of the Treaty of Paris. There were years of contention as to exactly where the eastern boundary of the 1803 Louisiana Purchase was—depending on which treaty was cited, as France, Great Britain, and Spain had redrawn the boundaries among themselves during the second half of the 18th century. Spain continued to claim territory on the eastern side of the Mississippi River until it and the United States settled this issue in the Pinckney Treaty. This region is today called the Florida Parishes.

In 1810, St. Francisville served as the capital of the Republic of West Florida, when area planters ousted the Spanish government of the Baton Rouge District and set up their own independent republic for 74 days, before being annexed to the Territory of Orleans, as a possession of the United States.

In 1824, when Feliciana Parish was split into East and West, St. Francisville became the seat of West Feliciana Parish's government.

In June 1863, Confederate Army officer William Walter Leake arranged for the burial here of Union Navy officer John E. Hart, who had died aboard his ship while taking part in the Union blockade of the Mississippi River. This event is re-enacted every June during a three-day commemoration called "The Day the War Stopped."

After the American Civil War, some Jewish emigrants fleeing religious persecution in Germany settled here. They made important contributions to commerce in the lean years following the war. Becoming successful merchants, they provided credit when the banks failed and built impressive Victorian homes, such as the Wolf-Schlessinger House. It is now operated as the St. Francisville Inn Bed and Breakfast.

=== 2000 to present ===
In recent years, community efforts have focused on restoration and preservation of the town's historic homes. St. Francisville is a popular tourist destination, with a number of restored historic plantations open for tours, including Rosedown Plantation State Historic Site, Audubon State Historic Site, Butler Greenwood Plantation, the Myrtles, and the Cottage Plantation, as well as several antebellum gardens.

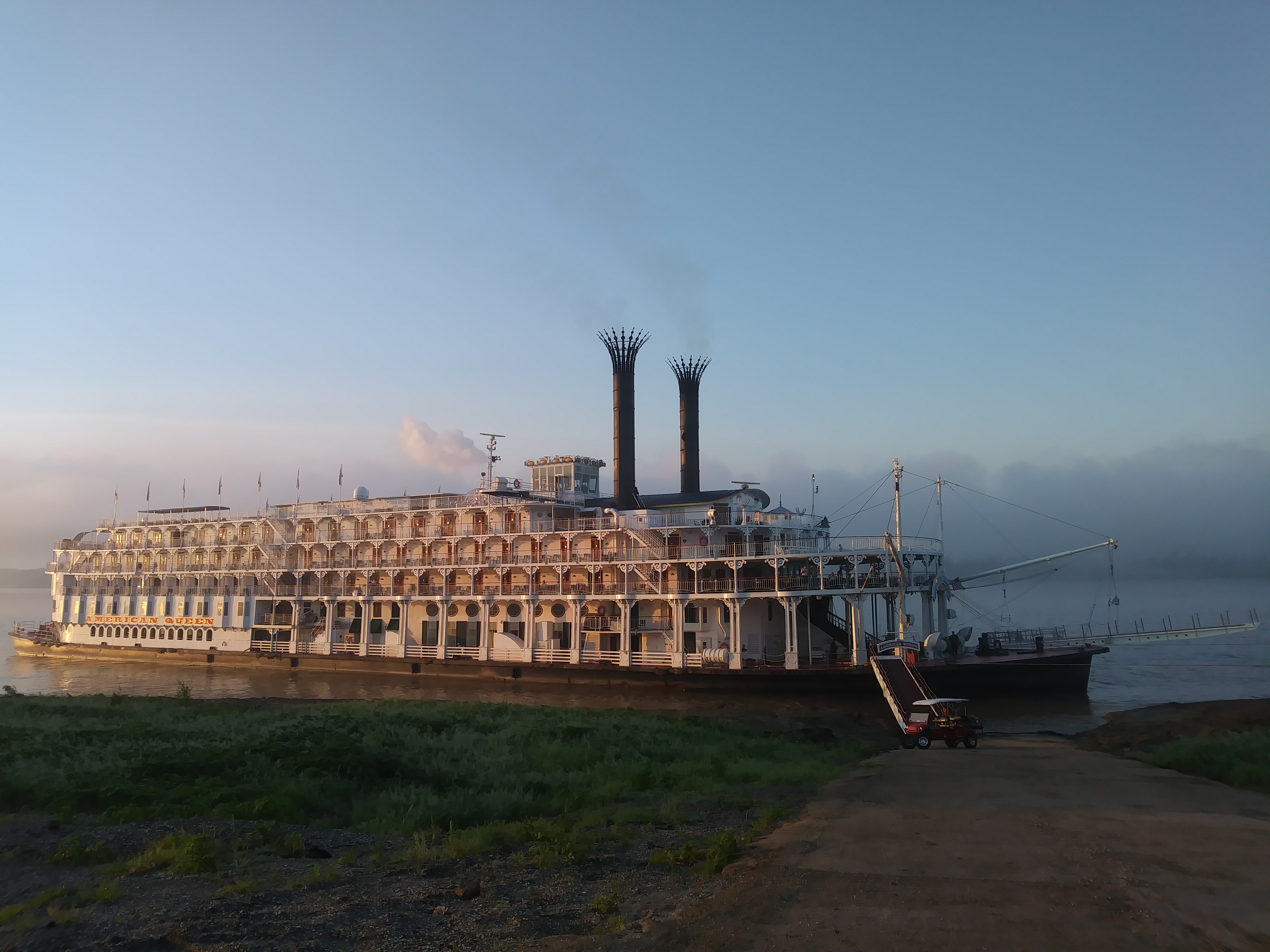
American Queen steamboat docked at the boat ramp located at the end of Ferdinand Street.

In June 2011, the John James Audubon Bridge was constructed as the new crossing of the Mississippi River. This was the successor to the ferry three miles up-river. It connected New Roads to St. Francisville via Louisiana Highway 10. Louisiana 10 then connected to US-61, three miles south of St. Francisville. On the opposite side of the bridge, Louisiana 10 crosses into Pointe Coupee Parish and connects with Louisiana Highway 1 to connect New Roads to St. Francisville.

In May 2011, low-lying parts of Saint Francisville flooded in the Mississippi River floods of that year.

== Geography ==
According to the United States Census Bureau, the town has a total area of 1.8 square miles (4.7 km^{2}), all land.

== Demographics ==
Historical population
Census	Pop.	Note	%±
1850	405		—
1880	721		—
1890	950		31.8%
1900	1,059		11.5%
1910	966		−8.8%
1920	673		−30.3%
1930	830		23.3%
1940	821		−1.1%
1950	936		14.0%
1960	1,661		77.5%
1970	1,603		−3.5%
1980	1,471		−8.2%
1990	1,700		15.6%
2000	1,712		0.7%
2010	1,765		3.1%
2020	1,557		−11.8%
2025 (est.)	1,484	▼	−4.7%
U.S. Decennial Census

St. Francisville racial composition as of 2020
Race	Number	Percentage
White (non-Hispanic)	1,061	68.14%
Black or African American (non-Hispanic)	339	21.77%
Native American	3	0.19%
Asian	10	0.64%
Pacific Islander	2	0.13%
Other/Mixed	76	4.88%
Hispanic or Latino	66	4.24%

St. Francisville first appeared in the 1850 U.S. census with a total recorded population of 405.

At the 2020 United States census, there were 1,557 people, 762 households, and 395 families residing in the town. The racial and ethnic makeup of the town was 71.0% White, 27.0% Black and African American, 0.6% some other race, and 1.4% two or more races at the 2019 American Community Survey. The median household income was $53,864 and 14.8% of the population lived at or below the poverty line.

At the 2000 United States census, there were 1,712 people, 693 households, and 456 families residing in the town. The population density was 936.9 inhabitants per square mile (361.7/km^{2}). There were 783 housing units at an average density of 428.5 per square mile (165.4/km^{2}). The racial makeup of the town was 71.03% White, 27.22% African American, 0.29% Native American, 0.53% Asian, 0.06% from other races, and 0.88% from two or more races. Hispanic or Latino of any race were 0.93% of the population.

There were 693 households, out of which 34.2% had children under the age of 18 living with them, 44.6% were married couples living together, 17.2% had a female householder with no husband present, and 34.1% were non-families. 30.3% of all households were made up of individuals, and 11.4% had someone living alone who was 65 years of age or older. The average household size was 2.42 and the average family size was 3.04.

In the town, the population was spread out, with 27.3% under the age of 18, 8.8% from 18 to 24, 29.2% from 25 to 44, 22.5% from 45 to 64, and 12.1% who were 65 years of age or older. The median age was 35 years. For every 100 females, there were 95.9 males. For every 100 females age 18 and over, there were 91.4 males.

The median income for a household in the town was $42,262, and the median income for a family was $54,333. Males had a median income of $41,563 versus $25,083 for females. The per capita income for the town was $21,639. About 5.8% of families and 8.8% of the population were below the poverty line, including 8.2% of those under the age of 18 and 12.4% of those 65 and older.

== Education ==
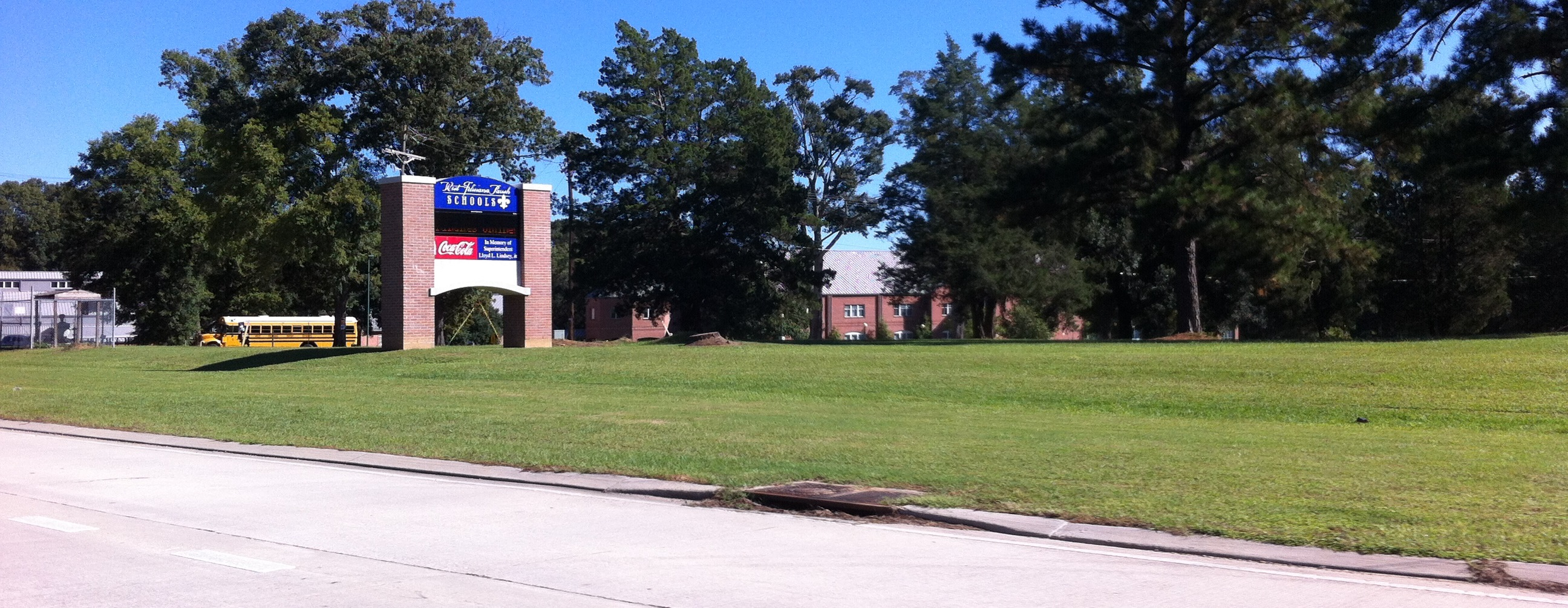
The entrance to the West Feliciana Parish Public Schools complex in Bains

West Feliciana Parish Public Schools serves the city. All of the public schools in the parish are located in unincorporated areas.

- West Feliciana High School West Feliciana High School - Welcome
- West Feliciana Middle School
- 2nd Grade-5th Grade: Bains Elementary School
- Preschool-1st Grade: Bains Lower Elementary

Julius Freyhan High School, the first public school in St. Francisville, was named after Jewish businessman Julius Freyhan. After his 1904 death, Freyhan bequeathed $8,000 (about $290,000 in today's currency) to have it built.) Freyhan High was built in 1907. The school was later rebuilt and renamed after him and it served the community until the early 1950s. In 2025, restoration efforts completed for the building to serve as a community center and a museum.

The West Feliciana Parish Library is located in St. Francisville. In 1996 the library moved into its current facility, a former U.S. post office at 11865 Ferdinand Street. The library, previously a part of the Audubon Regional Library System, became independent in January 2004.

West Feliciana Parish is in the service area of Baton Rouge Community College.

== Government and infrastructure ==
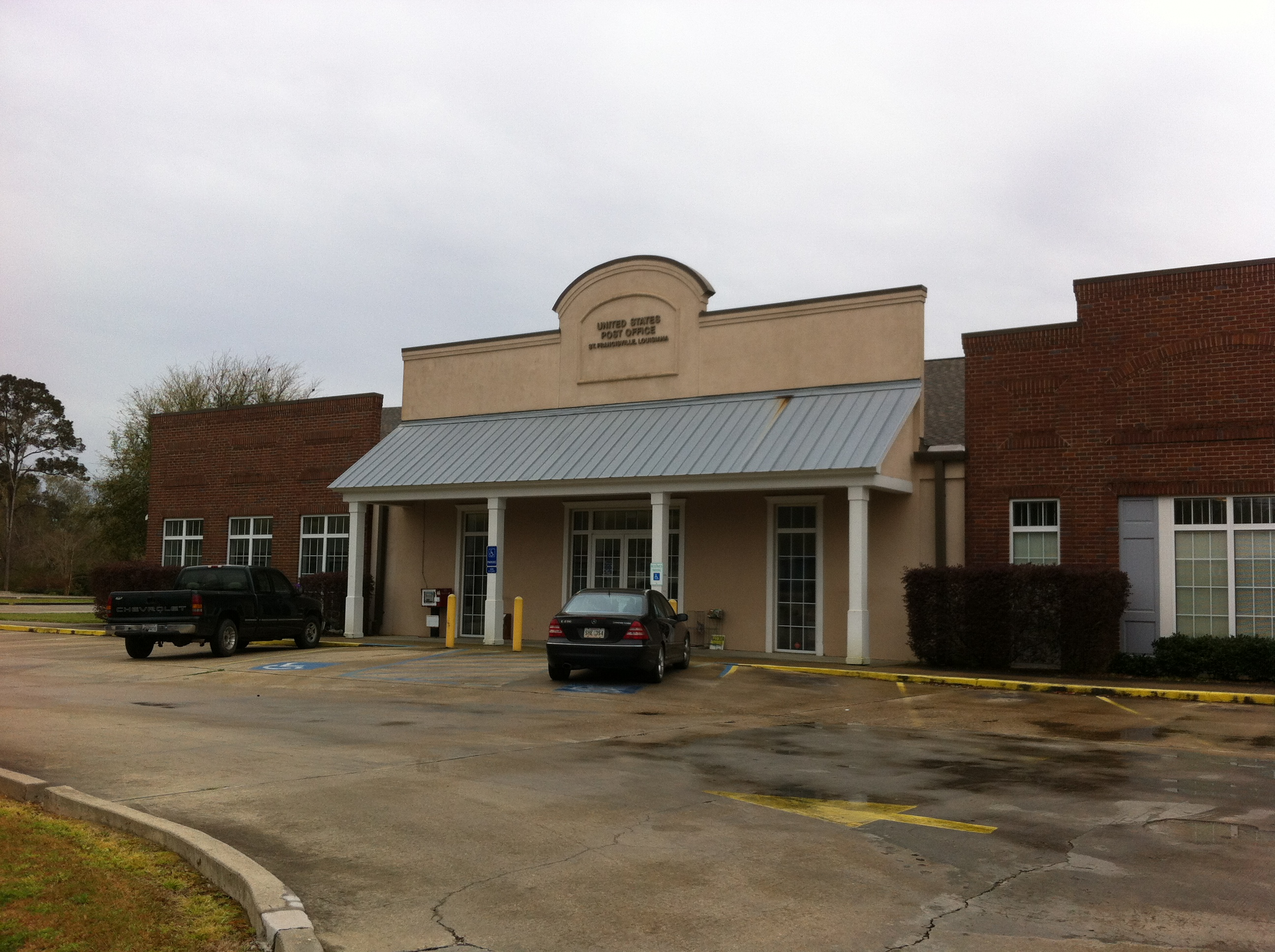
St. Francisville Post Office

The United States Postal Service operates the St. Francisville Post Office.

== Sports and recreation ==
West Feliciana Sports Park, part of West Feliciana Parish Parks and Recreation, is a 250-acre area that offers baseball, basketball, cross country, soccer, softball and tennis. The facility also has a rodeo area, walking paths, hiking paths and bike paths. The park hosts the home course for the Southern Jaguars and Lady Jaguars cross country teams.

== Notable people ==
- Hayley Arceneaux, SpaceX Inspiration4 astronaut
- Hattie Moseley Austin, born Hattie Gray in St. Francisville in 1900, founder of Hattie's Chicken Shack in Saratoga Springs, New York.
- Robert H. Barrow, 27th Commandant of the Marine Corps
- Chris Broadwater, current District 86 state representative, was born in St. Francisville in 1972.
- Billy Cannon, Heisman Trophy winner for LSU football and a dentist in St. Francisville
- Gil Dozier, former state commissioner of the Dept. of Agriculture and Forestry; practiced law in St. Francisville prior to 2011.
- Rod Dreher, author and journalist
- Cheston Folkes, state representative from West Feliciana Parish, 1908–1920, 1924–1932, and 1936–1940
- Kenny Havard, current District 62 state representative from East and West Feliciana parishes and for part of East Baton Rouge Parish
- William Walter Leake, Confederate Army officer, state senator, circuit court judge
- Derrick Todd Lee (November 5, 1968 – January 21, 2016), known as the Baton Rouge Serial Killer
- Max Raisin (1881–1957), rabbi
- John Rarick, former state district judge and U.S. Representative; lived most of his adult life in St. Francisville.
- Albert Voorhies, 10th Lieutenant Governor of Louisiana and former Louisiana Supreme Court Justice, was born in St. Francisville in 1829.

== See also ==
- National Register of Historic Places listings in West Feliciana Parish, Louisiana
- The St. Francisville Experiment (2000), a horror movie
