= 2018 Tulane Green Wave football team =

American college football season

2018 Tulane Green Wave football

AAC West Division co-champion Cure Bowl champion

Cure Bowl, W 41–24 vs. Louisiana
- Conference: American Athletic Conference
- West Division
- Record: 7–6 (5–3 The American)
- Head coach: Willie Fritz (3rd season)
- Offensive coordinator: Doug Ruse (3rd season)
- Offensive scheme: Spread option
- Defensive coordinator: Jack Curtis (3rd season)
- Base defense: 4–2–5
- Home stadium: Yulman Stadium

2018 American Athletic Conference football standings
	Conf.			Overall
Team	W		L	W		L
East Division
No. 11 UCF x$	8	–	0	12	–	1
Temple	7	–	1	8	–	5
No. 24 Cincinnati	6	–	2	11	–	2
South Florida	3	–	5	7	–	6
East Carolina	1	–	7	3	–	9
UConn	0	–	8	1	–	11
West Division
Memphis xy	5	–	3	8	–	6
Houston x	5	–	3	8	–	5
Tulane x	5	–	3	7	–	6
SMU	4	–	4	5	–	7
Navy	2	–	6	3	–	10
Tulsa	2	–	6	3	–	9
Championship: UCF 56, Memphis 41
$ – Conference champion; x – Division champion/co-champions; y – Championship game participant; Rankings from AP Poll

The 2018 Tulane Green Wave football team represented Tulane University in the 2018 NCAA Division I FBS football season. The Green Wave played their home games at Yulman Stadium in New Orleans, Louisiana, and competed in the West Division of the American Athletic Conference. They were led by third-year head coach Willie Fritz. They finished the season 7–6, 5–3 in AAC play to finish in a three way tie for the West Division championship. After tiebreakers, they did not represent the West Division in the AAC Championship Game. They were invited to the Cure Bowl where they defeated Louisiana to win their first bowl game since 2002.

== Preseason ==
=== Award watch lists ===
Listed in the order that they were released

Award	Player	Position	Year
Fred Biletnikoff Award	Terren Encalade	WR	SR
John Mackey Award	Charles Jones	TE	SR

=== AAC media poll ===
The AAC media poll was released on July 24, 2018, with the Green Wave predicted to finish in fifth place in the AAC West Division.

Media poll (West)
Predicted finish	Team	Votes (1st place)
1	Memphis	171 (23)
2	Houston	146 (4)
3	Navy	129 (3)
4	SMU	72
5	Tulane	68
6	Tulsa	44

== Roster ==
2018 Tulane Green Wave football team roster
Players
Coaches
Offense

Pos.	#	Name	Class
QB	1	Jonathan Banks	Sr
QB	2	Dane Ledford	Fr
WR	3	Darnell Mooney	Jr
QB	4	P.J. Hurst	So
WR	5	Terren Encalade	Sr
RB	6	Corey Dauphine	Jr
RB	7	Devin Glenn	Sr
QB	9	Keon Howard	Jr
RB	10	Darius Bradwell	Jr
RB	11	Amare Jones	Fr
QB	12	Justin McMillan	Sr
WR	13	Brian Newman	Sr
QB	14	Christian Daniels	Fr
WR	15	Jacob Robertson Jr.	So
QB	16	John Sakos	Fr
WR	17	Jorien Vallien	Fr
QB	19	Josh Holl	Fr
RB	20	Cameron Carroll	Fr
RB	21	James Poche	Fr
RB	22	Stephon Huderson	So
WR	23	Ryan Thompson	Fr
RB	27	Ygenio Booker	Fr
RB	30	Logan Ammons	Fr
RB	34	Jared Bertrand	Sr
TE	40	Connor Prouet	Fr
TE	46	Will Wallace	Fr
RB	47	Andrew Zuckerman	Jr
WR	48	Johnathon Keller	So
OL	50	Tyler Johnson	Jr
OL	51	Stephen Lewerenz	Fr
OL	52	Dominique Briggs	Sr
OL	53	Keyshawn McLeod	Jr
OL	57	Noah Fisher	Sr
OL	63	Cameron Jackel	Fr
OL	64	Corey Dublin	So
OL	66	Nik Hogan	Fr
OL	69	Hunter Knighton	Sr
OL	70	Timothy Shafter	Fr
OL	71	Ben Bratcher	Fr
OL	72	John Leglue	Sr
OL	74	Devon Johnson	Sr
OL	75	Max Wattenmaker	Fr
OL	76	Michael Remondet	Fr
OL	79	Joey Claybrook	Fr
TE	80	Tyrick James	Fr
WR	82	Jaetavian Toles	So
WR	83	Nick Toppino	Fr
TE	84	Charles Jones	Sr
WR	86	Sorrell Brown	Fr
WR	87	Kevin Ledee	Fr
WR	88	Jabril Clewis	Sr
TE	89	Kendall Ardoin	Sr

Defense

Pos.	#	Name	Class
CB	1	Donnie Lewis	Sr
S	2	Roderic Teamer	Sr
S	3	Larry Bryant	Jr
CB	8	Willie Langham	Fr
CB	9	Jaylon Monroe	So
S	12	Sean Harper	Jr
S	13	Quentin Brown	Fr
S	16	P. J. Hall	Jr
S	19	Taris Shenall	Sr
DB	21	Chris Joyce	Fr
S	25	Will Harper	Jr
CB	26	BoPete Keyes	Jr
LB	27	Nick Martorell	Fr
LB	28	Marvin Moody Jr.	So
LB	29	Keitha Jones Jr.	Fr
DE	30	Alfred Thomas	Fr
S	31	Larry Brooks	Fr
S	32	Grant Hamel	Fr
S	33	Tirise Barge	So
DE	34	Patrick Johnson	So
LB	35	Lawrence Graham	Jr
S	36	Chase Kuerschen	So
S	37	Macon Clark	Fr
LB	38	KJ Vault	Fr
LB	40	Zachery Harris	Sr
DE	42	Torri Singletary Jr.	Fr
DE	44	Juan Monjarres	Fr
NT	48	De'Andre Williams	So
DE	54	Carlos Hatcher	Fr
DE	55	Cameron Sample	So
DE	57	Peter Woullard	Sr
LB	59	Sam Bruchhaus	Fr
NT	68	Henry Stern	Jr
NT	77	Jeffery Johnson	Fr
DE	78	Davon Wright	Fr
DE	90	Robert Kennedy	Sr
DE	91	Noah Seiden	Fr
NT	93	Jamiran Jones	Fr
NT	95	Avery Jenkins	Fr
DE	98	Nick Kubiet	Fr
DE	99	Justin Walton	Fr

Special teams

Pos.	#	Name	Class
K/P	43	Coby Neenan	So
K	45	Randy Harvey	Jr
K/P	49	Zachary Block	Sr
LS	56	Austin Streaty	Fr
LS	60	Geron Eatherly	Jr
K	61	Davis Walker	Fr
K	62	Merek Glover	Jr
K	92	Sterling Stockwell	Fr
K	96	Casey Glover	Fr
P	97	Ryan Wright	Fr

Head coach

- Willie Fritz (Pittsburg State)

Coordinators/assistant coaches

- Will Hall (North Alabama)
  Offensive coordinator
- Jack Curtis (Evangel)
  Defensive coordinator/safeties
- Jamaal Fobbs (Oklahoma State)
  Running backs
- Kevin Peoples (Carroll College)
  Defensive line
- Slade Nagle (McNeese State)
  Tight ends
- Michael Mutz (Colorado Mesa)
  Linebackers
- Chris Hampton (South Carolina)
  Defensive backs
- Jeff Conway (Northwest Missouri State)
  Wide receivers
- J. J. McCleskey (Tennessee)
  Secondary Coach
- Cody Kennedy (Southeastern Louisiana)
  Offensive line

Legend

- (C) Team captain
- (S) Suspended
- (I) Ineligible
- Injured
- Redshirt

Roster
Last update: May 5, 2019

== Schedule ==
Date	Time	Opponent	Site	TV	Result	Attendance
August 30	7:00 p.m.	Wake Forest*	Yulman Stadium; New Orleans, LA	CBSSN	L 17–23 ^{OT}	15,478
September 8	7:00 p.m.	No. 11 (FCS) Nicholls*	Yulman Stadium; New Orleans, LA	ESPN3	W 42–17	21,092
September 15	12:00 p.m.	at UAB*	Legion Field; Birmingham, AL	Stadium	L 24–31	21,991
September 22	2:30 p.m.	at No. 4 Ohio State*	Ohio Stadium; Columbus, OH	BTN	L 6–49	103,336
September 28	7:00 p.m.	Memphis	Yulman Stadium; New Orleans, LA	ESPN2	W 40–24	16,631
October 6	11:00 a.m.	at Cincinnati	Nippert Stadium; Cincinnati, OH	ESPNU	L 21–37	32,200
October 20	2:30 p.m.	SMU	Yulman Stadium; New Orleans, LA	ESPNU	L 23–27	13,987
October 27	6:00 p.m.	at Tulsa	H. A. Chapman Stadium; Tulsa, OK	ESPNU	W 24–17	16,133
November 3	2:30 p.m.	at South Florida	Raymond James Stadium; Tampa, FL	CBSSN	W 41–15	31,388
November 10	3:00 p.m.	East Carolina^{†}	Yulman Stadium; New Orleans, LA	ESPNews	W 24–18	20,860
November 15	7:00 p.m.	at Houston	TDECU Stadium; Houston, TX	ESPN	L 17–48	24,209
November 24	11:00 a.m.	Navy	Yulman Stadium; New Orleans, LA	ESPNU	W 29–28	20,042
December 15	12:30 p.m.	vs. Louisiana*	Camping World Stadium; Orlando, FL (Cure Bowl)	CBSSN	W 41–24	19,066
*Non-conference game; ^{†}Homecoming; Rankings from AP Poll released prior to the game; All times are in Central time

Schedule source:

== Game summaries ==
=== Wake Forest ===
Wake Forest at Tulane – Game summary

Quarter	1	2	3	4	OT	Total
Demon Deacons	0	7	3	7	6	23
Green Wave	0	0	14	3	0	17

at Yulman Stadium, New Orleans, LA

- Date: August 30
- Game time: 7:00 p.m. CST
- Game weather: 78 °F (26 °C); cloudy
- Game attendance: 15,478
- Referee: Mike Roche
- TV announcers (CBS Sports Network): Ben Holden (play-by-play), Jay Feely (color analyst)

Game information

Second quarter

- WF - Alex Bachman 10-yard TD pass from Sam Hartman, Nick Sciba kick good, 6:45 (WF 7-0)

Third quarter

- TULN - Terren Encalade 52-yard TD pss from Jonathan Banks, Merek Glover kick good, 10:58 (TIE 7-7)
- WF - Nick Sciba 34-yard field goal, 7:29 (WF 10-7)
- TULN - Encalade 74-yard TD pass from Banks, Glover kick good, 1:42 (TULN 14-10)

Fourth quarter

- WF - Bachman 19-yard TD pass from Hartman, Sciba kick good, 14:35 (WF 17-14)
- TULN - Glover 39-yard field goal, 3:27 (TIE 17-17)

First overtime

- WF - Cade Carney 1-yard TD run, (WF 23-17)

Top passers

- WF - Sam Hartman - 31/51, 378 yards, 2 TD, 2 INT
- TULN - Jonathan Banks - 18/37, 281 yards, 2 TD

Top rushers

- WF - Sam Hartman - 13 carries, 64 yards
- TULN - Terren Encalade - carry, 38 yards

Top receivers

- WF - Sage Surratt - 11 receptions, 150 yards
- TULN - Terren Encalade - 8 receptions, 189 yards, 2 TD

=== Nicholls State ===
Nicholls at Tulane – Game summary

Quarter	1	2	3	4	Total
No. 11 (FCS) Colonels	3	7	0	7	17
Green Wave	7	14	7	14	42

at Yulman Stadium, New Orleans, LA

- Date: September 8
- Game time: 7:00 p.m. CST
- Game weather: 83 °F (28 °C); cloudy
- Game attendance: 21,092
- Referee: Henry Wimberg
- TV: ESPN3

Game information

First quarter

- TULN - Corey Dauphine 38-yard TD run, Merek Glover kick good, 6:12 (TULN 7-0)
- NICH - Lorran Fonseca 21-yard field goal, 0:07 (TULN 7-3)

Second quarter

- TULN - Dauphine 69-yard TD run, Glover kick good, 14:46 (TULN 14-3)
- TULN - Jonathan Banks 5-yard TD run, Glover kick good, 8:46 (TULN 21-3)
- NICH - Gabee Fuselier 7-yard TD pass from Chase Fourcade, Fonseca kick good, 0:23 (TULN 21-10)

Third quarter

- TULN - Darnell Mooney 12-yard TD pass from Banks, Glover kick good, 0:50 (TULN 28-10)

Fourth quarter

- NICH - Taylor 32-yard TD run, Fonseca kick good, 12:47 (TULN 28-17)
- TULN - Dauphine 35-yard TD run, Glover kick good, 8:47 (TULN 35-17)
- TULN - Amare Jones 1-yard TD run, Glover kick good, 2:00 (TULN 42-17)

Top passers

- TULN - Jonathan Banks - 12/16, 190 yards, TD
- NICH - Chase Fourcade - 17/31, 239 yards, TD, 2 INT

Top rushers

- TULN - Corey Dauphine - 6 carries, 152 yards, 3 TD
- NICH - Chase Fourcade - 14 carries, 53 yards

Top receivers

- TULN - Darnell Mooney - 6 receptions, 111 yards, TD
- NICH - Dai'Jean Dixon - 4 receptions, 112 yards

=== At UAB ===
Tulane at UAB – Game summary

Quarter	1	2	3	4	Total
Green Wave	0	7	14	3	24
Blazers	7	14	3	7	31

at Legion Field, Birmingham, AL

- Date: September 15
- Game time: 12:00 p.m. CST
- Game weather: 90 °F (32 °C); sunny
- Game attendance: 21,991
- Referee: Tony Calabrese
- TV: Facebook Live

Game information

First quarter

- UAB - A. J. Erdely 8-yard TD run, Nick Vogel kick good, 11:18 (UAB 7-0)

Second quarter

- UAB - Spencer Brown 2-yard TD run, Vogel kick good, 12:25 (UAB 14-0)
- TULN - Darius Bradwell 3-yard TD run, Merek Glover kick good, 9:29 (UAB 14-7)
- UAB - Garrett Marino 48-yard fumble return for TD, Vogel kick good, 2:31 (UAB 21-7)

Third quarter

- TULN - Darnell Mooney 44-yard TD pass from Jonathan Banks, Glover kick good, 13:12 (UAB 21-14)
- UAB - Vogel 37-yard field goal, 8:49 (UAB 24-14)
- TULN - Mooney 24-yard TD pass from Banks, Glover kick good, 6:12 (UAB 24-21)

Fourth quarter

- TULN - Glover 40-yard field goal, 10:01 (TIE 24-24)
- UAB - Logan Scott 14-yard TD pass from Erdely, Vogel kick good, 2:19 (UAB 31-24)

Top passers

- UAB - A. J. Erdely - 12/27, 180 yards, TD, 2 INT
- TULN - Jonathan Banks - 7/24, 180 yards, 2 TD, INT

Top rushers

- UAB - Spencer Brown - 24 carries, 101 yards, TD
- TULN - Darius Bradwell - 15 carries, 90 yards, TD

Top receivers

- UAB - Kailon Carter - 2 receptions, 49 yards
- TULN - Darnell Mooney - 4 receptions, 123 yards, 2 TD

=== At Ohio State ===
Tulane at Ohio State – Game summary

Quarter	1	2	3	4	Total
Green Wave	0	6	0	0	6
No. 4 Buckeyes	21	21	0	7	49

at Ohio Stadium, Columbus, OH

- Date: September 22
- Game time: 2:30 p.m. CST
- Game weather: 67 °F (19 °C); mostly cloudy
- Game attendance: 103,336
- Referee: Jeff Servinski
- TV announcers (Big Ten Network): Kevin Kugler and Matt Millen

Game information

First quarter

- OSU - Parris Campbell 14-yard TD pass from Dwayne Haskins, Sean Nuernberger kick good, 11:19 (OSU 7-0)
- OSU - Terry McLaurin 17-yard TD pass from Haskins, Nuernberger kick good, 6:56 (OSU 14-0)
- OSU - Campbell 37-yard TD pass from Haskins, Nuernberger kick good, 0:32 (OSU 21-0)

Second quarter

- TULN - Darius Bradwell 2-yard TD run, Merek Glover kick no good, 10:36 (OSU 21-6)
- OSU - Binjimen Victor 31-yard TD pass from Haskins, Nuernberger kick good, 7:55 (OSU 28-6)
- OSU - J. K. Dobbins 8-yard TD run, Nuernberger kick good, 3:31 (OSU 35-6)
- OSU - Austin Mack 14-yard TD pass from Haskins, Nuernberger kick good, 0:52 (OSU 42-6

Fourth quarter

- OSU - Tate Martell 1-yard TD run, Nuernberger kick good, 1:01 (OSU 49-6)

Top passers

- OSU - Dwayne Haskins - 21/24, 304 yards, 5 TD
- TULN - Jonathan Banks - 8/14, 141 yards

Top rushers

- OSU - J. K. Dobbins - 11 carries, 55 yards, TD
- TULN - Corey Dauphine - 6 carries, 53 yards

Top receivers

- OSU - Parris Campbell - 8 receptions, 147 yards, 2 TD
- TULN - Darnell Mooney - 4 receptions, 77 yards

=== Memphis ===
Memphis at Tulane – Game summary

Quarter	1	2	3	4	Total
Tigers	7	0	7	10	24
Green Wave	14	3	7	16	40

at Yulman Stadium, New Orleans, LA

- Date: September 28
- Game time: 7:00 p.m. CST
- Game weather: 77 °F (25 °C); rain
- Game attendance: 16,631
- Referee: Chs. Lamertina
- TV: ESPN2

Game information

First quarter

- TULN - Corey Dauphine 2-yard TD run, Merek Glover kick good, 9:16 (TULN 7-0)
- MEM - Darrell Henderson 47-yard TD run, Riley Patterson kick good, 9:04 (TIE 7-7)
- TULN - Darius Bradwell 53-yard TD run, Glover kick good, 5:40 (TULN 14-7)

Second quarter

- TULN - Glover 20-yard field goal, 0:00 (TULN 17-7)

Third quarter

- MEM - Henderson 43-yard TD pass from Brady White, Patterson kick good, 12:50 (TULN 17-14)
- TULN - Darnell Mooney 51-yard TD pass from Justin McMillan, Glover kick good, 0:00 (TULN 24-14)

Fourth quarter

- TULN - Team safety, 14:37 (TULN 26-14)
- TULN - Dauphine 46-yard TD run, Glover kick good, 11:50 (TULN 33-14)
- TULN - Bradwell 25-yard TD run, Glover kick good, 8:56 (TULN 40-14)
- MEM - Tony Pollard 2-yard TD pass from White, Patterson kick good, 7:05 (TULN 40-21)
- MEM - Riley Patterson 43-yard field goal, 2:01 (TULN 40-24)

Top passers

- TULN - Jonathan Banks - 12/21, 127 yards
- MEM - Brady White - 14/30, 246 yards, 2 TD

Top rushers

- TULN - Darius Bradwell - 19 carries, 143 yards, 2 TD
- MEM - Darrell Henderson - 7 carries, 51 yards, TD

Top receivers

- TULN - Darnell Mooney - 4 receptions, 94 yards, TD
- MEM - Damonte Coxie - 5 receptions, 67 yards

=== At Cincinnati ===
Tulane at Cincinnati – Game summary

Quarter	1	2	3	4	Total
Green Wave	7	7	0	7	21
Bearcats	3	21	6	7	37

at Nippert Stadium, Cincinnati, OH

- Date: October 6
- Game time: 11:00 a.m. CST
- Game weather: 82 °F (28 °C); partly cloudy, warm
- Game attendance: 32,200
- Referee: Adam Savoie
- TV: ESPNU

Game information

First quarter

- CIN - Cole Smith 28-yard field goal, 5:55 (CIN 3-0)
- TULN - Darnell Mooney 17-yard TD pass from Justin McMillan, Merek Glover kick good, 2:01 (TULN 7-3)

Second quarter

- CIN - Michael Warren II 81-yard TD run, Smith kick good, 13:38 (CIN 10-7)
- CIN - Kahlil Lewis 25-yard TD pass from Desmond Ridder, Smith kick good, 4:20 (CIN 17-7)
- TULN - Darius Bradwell 19-yard TD run, Glover kick good, 2:51 (CIN 17-14)
- CIN - Ridder 28-yard TD run, Smith kick good, 0:41 (CIN 24-14)

Third quarter

- CIN - Lewis 15-yard Td pass from Ridder, Smith kick no good, 12:25 (CIN 30-14)

Fourth quarter

- CIN - Tavion Thomas 25-yard TD run, Smith kick good, 6:15 (CIN 37-14)
- TULN - Terren Encalade 14-yard TD pass from McMillan, Glover kick good, 4:26 (CIN 37-21)

Top passers

- CIN - Desmond Ridder - 15/25, 174 yards, 2 TD, INT
- TULN - Justin McMillan - 11/26, 130 yards, 2 TD

Top rushers

- CIN - Michael Warren II - 18 carries, 123 yards, TD
- TULN - Darius Bradwell - 16 carries, 88 yards, TD

Top receivers

- CIN - Josiah Deguara - 3 receptions, 49 yards
- TULN - Darnell Mooney - 4 receptions, 65 yards, TD

=== SMU ===
Southern Methodist at Tulane – Game summary

Quarter	1	2	3	4	Total
Mustangs	0	7	7	13	27
Green Wave	2	7	7	7	23

at Yulman Stadium, New Orleans, LA

- Date: October 20
- Game time: 2:30 p.m. CST
- Game weather: 85 °F (29 °C); rain
- Game attendance: 13,987
- Referee: Riley Johnson
- TV: ESPNU

Game information

First quarter

- TULN - Team safety, 3:47 (TULN 2-0)

Second quarter

- TULN - Darius Bradwell 10-yard TD run, Merek Glover kick good, 14:55 (TULN 9-0)
- SMU - Xavier Jones 55-yard TD pass from Ben Hicks, Kevin Robledo kick good, 11:38 (TULN 9-7)

Third quarter

- TULN - Donnie Lewis Jr. 49-yard interception returned for TD, Glover kick good, 13:05 (TULN 16-7)
- SMU - Reggie Roberson 16-yard TD pass from Hicks, Robledo kick good, 8:08 (TULN 16-14)

Fourth quarter

- TULN - Jonathan Banks 3-yard TD run, Glover kick good, 12:58 (TULN 23-14)
- SMU - Braeden West 29-yard TD run, Robledo kick good, 11:29 (TULN 23-21)
- SMU - James Proche 67-yard TD pass from Hicks, two-point conversion pass no good, 1:15 (SMU 27-23)

Top passers

- SMU - Ben Hicks - 21/40, 291 yards, 3 TD, INT
- TULN - Jonathan Banks - 14/22, 153 yards, INT

Top rushers

- SMU - Braeden West - 12 carries, 51 yards, TD
- TULN - Darius Bradwell - 13 carries, 72 yards, TD

Top receivers

- SMU - Reggie Roberson - 7 receptions, 99 yards, TD
- TULN - Terren Encalade - 4 receptions, 39 yards

=== At Tulsa ===
Tulane at Tulsa – Game summary

Quarter	1	2	3	4	Total
Green Wave	0	7	7	10	24
Golden Hurricane	3	7	7	0	17

at Skelly Field at H. A. Chapman Stadium, Tulsa, OK

- Date: October 27
- Game time: 6:00 p.m. CST
- Game weather: 75 °F (24 °C); clear
- Game attendance: 16,133
- Referee: Tracy Jones
- TV: ESPNU

Game information

First quarter

- TUL - Nathan Walker 35-yard field goal, 5:25 (TUL 3-0)

Second quarter

- TUL - Keylon Stokes 28-yard TD pass from Seth Boomer, John Parker Romo kick good, 9:58 (TUL 10-0)
- TULN - Darius Bradwell 1-yard TD run, Merek Glover kick good, 0:47 (TUL 10-7)

Third quarter

- TUL - Stokes 14-yard TD run, Romo kick good, 7:47 (TUL 17-7)
- TULN - Justin McMillan 1-yard TD run, Glover kick good, 4:16 (TUL 17-14)

Fourth quarter

- TULN - Glover 20-yard field goal, 12:06 (TIE 17-17)
- TULN - McMillan 39-yard TD run, Glover kick good, 3:46 (TULN 24-17)

Top passers

- TULN - Justin McMillan - 10/19, 92 yards
- TUL - Seth Boomer - 12/26, 180 yards, TD

Top rushers

- TULN - Corey Dauphine - 18 carries, 107 yards
- TUL - Shamari Brooks - 18 carries, 57 yards

Top receivers

- TULN - Terren Encalade - 4 receptions, 44 yards
- TUL - Keenen Johnson - 2 receptions, 49 yards

=== At South Florida ===
Tulane at South Florida – Game summary

Quarter	1	2	3	4	Total
Green Wave	7	20	7	7	41
Bulls	3	0	6	6	15

at Raymond James Stadium, Tampa, FL

- Date: November 3
- Game time: 2:30 p.m. CST
- Game weather: ;
- Game attendance: 31,388
- Referee: Anthony Calabre
- TV: CBS Sports Network

Game information

First quarter

- USF - Coby Weiss 27-yard field goal, 7:40 (USF 3-0)
- TULN - Justin McMillan 33-yard TD run, Merek Glover kick good, 2:49 (TULN 7-3)

Second quarter

- TULN - Glover 38-yard field goal, 13:31 (TULN 10-3)
- TULN - Corey Dauphine 1-yard TD run, Glover kick good, 11:23 (TULN 17-3)
- TULN - Dauphine 21-yard TD run, Glover kick good, 5:57 (TULN 24-3)
- TULN - Glover 24-yard field goal, 0:08 (TULN 27-3)

Third quarter

- TULN - Darius Bradwell 73-yard TD run, Glover kick good, 3:48 (TULN 34-3)
- USF - Johnny Ford 5-yard TD run, Weiss kick no good, 0:45 (TULN 34-9)

Fourth quarter

- USF - Blake Barnett 1-yard TD run, Barnett two-point conversion pass no good, 9:26 (TULN 34-15)
- TULN - Amare Jones 8-yard TD run, Glover kick good, 1:52 (TULN 41-15)

Top passers

- TULN - Justin McMillan - 4/11, 61 yards
- USF - Blake Barnett - 29/49, 338 yards, INT

Top rushers

- TULN - Darius Bradwell - 15 carries, 135 yards, TD
- USF - Blake Barnett - 16 carries, 51 yards, TD

Top receivers

- TULN - Darnell Mooney - reception, 39 yards
- USF - Tyre McCants - 9 receptions, 85 yards

=== East Carolina ===
East Carolina at Tulane – Game summary

Quarter	1	2	3	4	Total
Pirates	3	7	0	8	18
Green Wave	7	7	7	3	24

at Yulman Stadium, New Orleans, LA

- Date: November 10
- Game time: 3:00 p.m. CST
- Game weather: 54 °F (12 °C); sunny
- Game attendance: 20,860
- Referee: Mike Roche
- TV: ESPNews

Game information

First quarter

- ECU - Jake Verity 46-yard field goal, 10:31 (ECU 3-0)
- TULN - Darnell Mooney 86-yard TD pass from Justin McMillan, Merek Glover kick good, 6:50 (TULN 7-3)

Second quarter

- TULN - Terren Encalade 73-yard TD pass from McMillan, Glover kick good, 5:13 (TULN 14-3)
- ECU - Trevon Brown 80-yard TD pass from Holton Ahlers, Verity kick good, 2:31 (TULN 14-10)

Third quarter

- TULN - Mooney 79-yard TD pass from McMillan, Glover kick good, 12:19 (TULN 21-10)

Fourth quarter

- ECU - Brown 31-yard TD pass from Ahlers, Ahlers two-point conversion pass to Brown good, 11:54 (TULN 21-18)
- TULN - Glover 33-yard field goal, 7:35 (TULN 24-18)

Top passers

- TULN - Justin McMillan - 12/28, 372 yards, 3 TD
- ECU - Holton Ahlers - 21/67, 360 yards, 2 TD, INT

Top rushers

- TULN - Darius Bradwell - 19 carries, 77 yards
- ECU - Holton Ahlers - 16 carries, 67 yards

Top receivers

- TULN - Darnell Mooney - 6 receptions, 217 yards, 2 TD
- ECU - Trevon Brown - 8 receptions, 161 yards, 2 TD

=== At Houston ===
Tulane at Houston – Game summary

Quarter	1	2	3	4	Total
Green Wave	6	3	0	8	17
Cougars	14	17	10	7	48

at TDECU Stadium, Houston, TX

- Date: November 15
- Game time: 7:00 p.m. CST
- Game weather: 53 °F (12 °C); clear
- Game attendance: 24,209
- Referee: Tracy Jones
- TV: ESPN

Game information

First quarter

- HOU - Patrick Carr 21-yard TD run, Dalton Witherspoon kick good, 6:26 (HOU 7-0)
- TULN - Darius Bradwell 20-yard TD run, Merek Glover kick no good, 5:39 (HOU 7-6)
- HOU - Carr 3-yard TD run, Witherspoon kick good, 4:21 (HOU 14-6)

Second quarter

- TULN - Glover 40-yard field goal, 14:08 (HOU 14-9)
- HOU - Romello Brooker 11-yard TD pass from D'Eriq King, Witherspoon kick good, 9:07 (HOU 21-9)
- HOU - King 3-yard TD run, Witherspoon kick good, 3:25 (HOU 28-9)
- HOU - Witherspoon 29-yard field goal, 0:22 (HOU 31-9)

Third quarter

- HOU - Jeremy Singleton 37-yard TD pass from Clayton Tune, Witherspoon kick good, 9:34 (HOU 38-9)
- HOU - Witherspoon 27-yard field goal, 4:21 (HOU 41-9)

Fourth quarter

- TULN - Amare Jones 1-yard TD run, McMillan two-point conversion run good, 14:28 (HOU 41-17)
- HOU - Parker Eichenberger 2-yard TD pass from Tune, Witherspoon kick good, 6:10 (HOU 48-17)

Top passers

- HOU - Clayton Tune - 6/15, 108 yards, 2 TD, INT
- TULN - Justin McMillan - 10/20, 147 yards, 2 INT

Top rushers

- HOU - Patrick Carr - 18 carries, 139 yards, 2 TD
- TULN - Darius Bradwell - 14 carries, 89 yards, TD

Top receivers

- HOU - Romello Brooker - 5 receptions, 57 yards, TD
- TULN - Terren Encalade - 2 receptions, 52 yards

=== Navy ===
Navy at Tulane – Game summary

Quarter	1	2	3	4	Total
Midshipmen	0	3	18	7	28
Green Wave	0	21	0	8	29

at Yulman Stadium, New Orleans, LA

- Date: November 24
- Game time: 11:00 a.m. CST
- Game weather: 63 °F (17 °C); cloudy; 5 MPH
- Game attendance: 20,042
- Referee: Charles Lamerti
- TV announcers (ESPNU): Rene Ingoglia and Mike Corey

Game information

Second quarter

- TULN - Darnell Mooney 55-yard TD pass from Justin McMillan, Merek Glover kick good, 14:53 (TULN 7-0)
- NAVY - Bennett Moehring 48-yard field goal, 7:40 (TULN 7-3)
- TULN - McMillan 5-yard TD run, Glover kick good, 4:26 (TULN 14-3)
- TULN - Jabril Clewis 52-yard TD pass from McMillan, Glover kick good, 1:00 (TULN 21-3)

Third quarter

- NAVY - Moehring 19-yard field goal, 9:42 (TULN 21-6)
- NAVY - Zach Abey 37-yard TD pass from Malcolm Perry, Moehring kick good, 4:02 (TULN 21-13)
- NAVY - Perry 73-yard TD pass from Abey, Abey two-point conversion pass to Taylor Jackson good, 2:47 (TIE 21-21)

Fourth quarter

- NAVY - Tazh Maloy 9-yard TD run, Moehring kick good, 3:44 (NAVY 28-21)
- TULN - Jaetavian Toles 26-yard TD pass from McMillan, McMillan two-point conversion pass to Charles Jones II good, 1:27 (TULN 29-28)

Top passers

- TULN - Justin McMillan - 18/29, 291 yards, 3 TD, INT
- NAVY - Zach Abey - 7/13, 167 yards, TD

Top rushers

- TULN - Darius Bradwell - 15 carries, 66 yards
- NAVY - Anthony Gargiulo - 12 carries, 44 yards

Top receivers

- TULN - Darnell Mooney - 5 receptions, 135 yards, TD
- NAVY - Malcolm Perry - reception, 73 yards, TD

=== Vs. Louisiana (Cure Bowl) ===
Tulane vs. Louisiana – Game summary

Quarter	1	2	3	4	Total
Green Wave	21	3	3	14	41
Ragin' Cajuns	7	3	7	7	24

at Camping World Stadium, Orlando, FL

- Date: December 15
- Game time: 12:30 p.m. CST
- Game weather: Cloudy • Temperature: 57 °F (14 °C) • Wind: 9 WSW MPH
- Game attendance: 19,066
- Referee: Jon Noli
- TV: CBS Sports Network

Game information

First quarter

- LA - Raymond Calais 38-yard TD run, Kyle Pfau kick good, 12:25 (LA 7-0)
- TULN - Darius Bradwell 15-yard TD run, Merek Glover kick good, 9:49 (TIE 7-7)
- TULN - Terren Encalade 38-yard TD pass from Justin McMillan, Glover kick good, 5:21 (TULN 14-7)
- TULN - Amare Jones 1-yard TD run, Glover kick good, 0:48 (TULN 21-7)

Second quarter

- TULN - Glover 38-yard field goal, 10:14 (TULN 24-7)
- LA - Pfau 43-yard field goal, 0:00 (TULN 24-10)

Third quarter

- LA - Elijah Mitchell 3-yard TD run, Pfau kick good, 9:46 (TULN 24-17)
- TULN - Glover 26-yard field goal, 2:58 (TULN 27-17)

Fourth quarter

- LA - Jarrod Jackson 13-yard TD pas from Andre Nunez, Pfau kick good, 10:16 (TULN 27-24)
- TULN - Bradwell 4-yard TD run, Glover kick good, 3:49 (TULN 34-24)
- TULN - McMillan 16-yard TD run, Glover kick good, 3:06 (TULN 41-24)

Top passers

- TULN - Justin McMillan - 11/18, 145 yards, TD, INT
- LA - Andre Nunez - 8/17, 136 yards, TD

Top rushers

- TULN - Darius Bradwell - 35 carries, 150 yards, 2 TD
- LA - Raymond Calais - 3 carries, 41 yards, TD

Top receivers

- TULN - Terren Encalade - 5 receptions, 93 yards, TD
- LA - Ryheem Malone - 3 receptions, 59 yards

== Players drafted into the NFL ==
Round	Pick	Player	Position	NFL club
7	221	Donnie Lewis	CB	Cleveland Browns
