= 2018 Houston Cougars football team =

American college football season

2018 Houston Cougars football

AAC West Division co-champion

Armed Forces Bowl, L 14–70 vs. Army
- Conference: American Athletic Conference
- West Division
- Record: 8–5 (5–3 American)
- Head coach: Major Applewhite (2nd season)
- Offensive coordinator: Kendal Briles (1st season)
- Offensive scheme: Hurry-up, no-huddle spread
- Defensive coordinator: Mark D'Onofrio (2nd season)
- Base defense: 4–3
- Home stadium: TDECU Stadium

2018 American Athletic Conference football standings
	Conf.			Overall
Team	W		L	W		L
East Division
No. 11 UCF x$	8	–	0	12	–	1
Temple	7	–	1	8	–	5
No. 24 Cincinnati	6	–	2	11	–	2
South Florida	3	–	5	7	–	6
East Carolina	1	–	7	3	–	9
UConn	0	–	8	1	–	11
West Division
Memphis xy	5	–	3	8	–	6
Houston x	5	–	3	8	–	5
Tulane x	5	–	3	7	–	6
SMU	4	–	4	5	–	7
Navy	2	–	6	3	–	10
Tulsa	2	–	6	3	–	9
Championship: UCF 56, Memphis 41
$ – Conference champion; x – Division champion/co-champions; y – Championship game participant; Rankings from AP Poll

The 2018 Houston Cougars football team represented the University of Houston in the 2018 NCAA Division I FBS football season. The Cougars played their home games at TDECU Stadium in Houston, Texas, and competed in the West Division of the American Athletic Conference. They were led by second-year head coach Major Applewhite. They finished the season 8–5, 5–3 in AAC play to finish in a three-way tie for the West Division championship. After tiebreakers, they did not represent the West Division in the AAC Championship Game. They were invited to the Armed Forces Bowl where they lost to Army by a score of 14–70, in the process tying records for the most points given up (70) and the largest margin-of-loss (56) in NCAA bowl game history.

On December 30, Houston fired Applewhite after 2 seasons.

== Preseason ==
=== Award watch lists ===
Listed in the order that they were released

Award	Player	Position	Year
Lott Trophy	Ed Oliver	DT	JR
Rimington Trophy	Will Noble	C	SR
Chuck Bednarik Award	Ed Oliver	DT	JR
Maxwell Award	Ed Oliver	DT	JR
Bronko Nagurski Trophy	Ed Oliver	DT	JR
Outland Trophy	Will Noble	C	SR
Outland Trophy	Ed Oliver	DT	JR
Ray Guy Award	Dane Roy	P	JR
Wuerffel Trophy	Mulbah Car	RB	JR
Walter Camp Award	Ed Oliver	DT	JR
Earl Campbell Tyler Rose Award	D'Eriq King	QB	JR

=== AAC media poll ===
The AAC media poll was released on July 24, 2018, with the Cougars predicted to finish in second place in the AAC West Division.

Media poll (West)
Predicted finish	Team	Votes (1st place)
1	Memphis	171 (23)
2	Houston	146 (4)
3	Navy	129 (3)
4	SMU	72
5	Tulane	68
6	Tulsa	44

== Schedule ==
Date	Time	Opponent	Site	TV	Result	Attendance
September 1	11:00 a.m.	at Rice*	Rice Stadium; Houston, TX (rivalry)	CBSSN	W 45–27	26,390
September 8	11:00 a.m.	Arizona*	TDECU Stadium; Houston, TX	ABC/ESPN2	W 45–18	32,534
September 15	3:00 p.m.	at Texas Tech*	Jones AT&T Stadium; Lubbock, TX (rivalry)	FOX	L 49–63	53,484
September 22	7:00 p.m.	Texas Southern*	TDECU Stadium; Houston, TX	ESPN3	W 70–14	29,970
October 4	7:00 p.m.	Tulsa	TDECU Stadium; Houston, TX	ESPN	W 41–26	29,823
October 13	6:00 p.m.	at East Carolina	Dowdy–Ficklen Stadium; Greenville, NC	CBSSN	W 42–20	29,851
October 20	2:30 p.m.	at Navy	Navy–Marine Corps Memorial Stadium; Annapolis, MD	CBSSN	W 49–36	33,924
October 27	2:30 p.m.	No. 21 South Florida	TDECU Stadium; Houston, TX	ABC/ESPN2	W 57–36	31,631
November 3	6:00 p.m.	at SMU	Gerald J. Ford Stadium; Dallas, TX (rivalry)	ESPNU	L 31–45	23,654
November 10	6:00 p.m.	Temple^{†}	TDECU Stadium; Houston, TX	CBSSN	L 49–59	30,862
November 15	7:00 p.m.	Tulane	TDECU Stadium; Houston, TX	ESPN	W 48–17	24,209
November 23	11:00 a.m.	at Memphis	Liberty Bowl Memorial Stadium; Memphis, TN	ABC	L 31–52	27,790
December 22	2:30 p.m.	vs. Army*	Amon G. Carter Stadium; Fort Worth, TX (Armed Forces Bowl)	ESPN	L 14–70	44,738
*Non-conference game; ^{†}Homecoming; Rankings from AP Poll (and CFP Rankings, after October 30) - Released prior to game; All times are in Central time

Schedule source:

== Roster ==
2018 Houston Cougars football team roster
Players
Coaches
Offense

Pos.	#	Name	Class
QB	1	Bryson Smith	Fr
WR	2	Keith Corbin	Jr
QB	3	Clayton Tune	Fr
QB	4	D'Eriq King	Jr
WR	5	Marquez Stevenson	So
WR	6	Kinte Hatton	Sr
WR	9	Courtney Lark	Jr
WR	10	Jeremy Singleton	Fr
QB	12	Quinten Dormady	Sr
QB	14	Ike Ogbogu	Fr
WR	15	Raelon Singleton	Sr
WR	17	Terry Mark	Jr
WR	19	Julon Williams	Fr
RB	21	Patrick Carr	Jr
RB	22	Terence Williams	Sr
RB	23	Chandler Smith	So
RB	25	Kelan Walker	Fr
WR	26	Ja'Kori Morgan	Fr
WR	27	Henry Thomas	Fr
RB	28	Josh Burrell	Jr
WR	30	Timon Nolan	Jr
RB	32	Kevrin Justice	Jr
RB	34	Mulbah Car	Jr
WR	36	James Homan	Sr
WR	37	Payton Pardee	Jr
WR	39	Andrew Segovia	Jr
TE	45	Spencer Wells	Fr
OL	52	Braylon Jones	Jr
OL	53	Hayden Mark	So
OL	56	Dixie Wooten III	Fr
OL	60	Kordell Snyder	So
OL	62	Jarrid Williams	Jr
OL	64	Dennis Bardwell	So
OL	65	Bo Alexander	Jr
OL	66	Cole Miller	So
OL	69	Will Noble	Sr
OL	70	Jordan Boatman	Fr
OL	71	Max Banes	Fr
OL	72	Mason Denley	Sr
OL	73	Kameron Lewis	Fr
OL	74	Josh Jones	Jr
OL	75	Jack Freeman	Fr
OL	76	Kameron Eloph	Jr
OL	77	Keenan Murphy	So
WR	80	Colton Cerday	Jr
WR	81	Tre'von Bradley	Fr
TE	82	Romello Brooker	Sr
WR	83	Peyton Sawyer	Fr
WR	84	Cole McGowan	So
TE	85	Christian Trahan	Fr
TE	86	Payton Haslam	Sr
TE	87	Sid Turnbull-Frazier	Jr
TE	88	Shane Creamer	Fr
TE	89	Parker Eichenberger	Fr

Defense

Pos.	#	Name	Class
DB	1	Garrett Davis	Sr
DB	2	Deontay Anderson	So
DB	3	Grant Stuard	So
LB	4	Leroy Godfrey	Jr
LB	5	Darrion Owens	Sr
DB	6	Khari Dotson	Sr
LB	8	Emeke Egbule	Sr
CB	9	Nick Watkins	Sr
DT	10	Ed Oliver	Jr
LB	12	David Anenih	So
CB	13	Joeal Williams	Sr
CB	14	Isaiah Johnson	Sr
CB	16	Ka'Darian Smith	Jr
CB	18	Alexander Myres	Sr
CB	19	Javian Smith	So
LB	20	Roman Brown	Sr
DB	21	Gleson Sprewell	So
LB	22	Austin Robinson	Sr
DE	23	Willie Smith III	Fr
LB	24	Donavan Mutin	Fr
DB	25	D. J. Small	So
LB	26	Elijah Gooden	So
LB	27	Amaud Willis-Dalton	Fr
DB	29	Darius Gilbert	Jr
LB	30	Alexander Duke	Fr
LB	31	Derek Parish	Fr
DB	33	Garrison Vaughn	Fr
DB	35	Johnathan Phenix	Fr
CB	36	Zaire Taylor	Fr
LB	37	Zamar Kirven	Fr
DB	39	Shaun Lewis	Fr
LB	40	Jordan Carmouche	So
DB	41	Bradley Mbu	Jr
LB	43	Dekalen Goodson	Fr
LB	45	Jordan Milburn	Jr
LB	46	Melvin Larkins	Fr
DB	48	Torrey Richardson	Fr
DT	50	Aymiel Fleming	Jr
DL	51	Tariq Freeny	So
DE	52	Jerard Carter	Sr
LB	59	Jacob Daulong	Fr
DL	80	Noah Jones	Fr
DE	90	Zach Vaughan	Sr
DE	91	Tahj Brown	Fr
DL	92	Logan Hall	Fr
DL	94	Isaiah Chambers	So
DL	98	Payton Turner	So
DL	99	Blake Young	Jr

Special teams

Pos.	#	Name	Class
P	38	Dane Roy	Jr
K	42	Caden Novikoff	Sr
LS	44	Anthony Cantu	Jr
K	47	Dalton Witherspoon	So
LS	97	Nick Wildberger	Jr

Head coach

- Major Applewhite (Texas)

Coordinators/assistant coaches

- Kendal Briles (Houston)
  Offensive coordinator/quarterbacks
- Mark D'Onofrio (Penn State)
  Defensive coordinator
- James Casey (Rice)
  Special teams coordinator/tight ends
- Randy Clements (Stephen F. Austin)
  Run game coordinator/offensive line
- A. J. Blum (Ashland)
  Defensive line
- Dan Carrel (West Liberty)
  Outside linebackers
- Kenny Guiton (Ohio State)
  Wide receivers
- Lamar Morgan (Louisiana–Lafayette)
  Safeties
- Kenith Pope (Oklahoma)
  Running backs
- Paul Williams (Delaware)
  Cornerbacks
- Thomas Dunson (LSU)
  Defensive football analyst
- Kyle Robinson (Alabama)
  Special teams football analyst
- Malcolm Kelly (Oklahoma)
  Offensive football analyst
- Mason McClendon (Houston)
  Analyst
- Colton Freeman (Houston)
  Analyst

Legend

- (C) Team captain
- (S) Suspended
- (I) Ineligible
- Injured
- Redshirt

Roster
Last update: May 13, 2020

== Game summaries ==
=== At Rice ===
	1	2	3	4	Total
Cougars	3	14	14	14	45
Owls	7	17	3	0	27

=== Arizona ===
	1	2	3	4	Total
Wildcats	0	0	10	8	18
Cougars	21	10	7	7	45

=== At Texas Tech ===
	1	2	3	4	Total
Cougars	21	7	14	7	49
Red Raiders	14	21	14	14	63

=== Texas Southern ===
	1	2	3	4	Total
Tigers	0	0	7	7	14
Cougars	14	28	7	21	70

=== Tulsa ===
	1	2	3	4	Total
Golden Hurricane	13	0	10	3	26
Cougars	7	10	0	24	41

=== At East Carolina ===
	1	2	3	4	Total
Cougars	14	7	7	14	42
Pirates	0	3	3	14	20

=== At Navy ===
	1	2	3	4	Total
Cougars	7	14	14	14	49
Midshipmen	10	14	0	12	36

=== South Florida ===
	1	2	3	4	Total
No. 21 Bulls	0	21	15	0	36
Cougars	14	14	15	14	57

=== At SMU ===
	1	2	3	4	Total
No. 17 Cougars	0	14	3	14	31
Mustangs	10	21	7	7	45

=== Temple ===
	1	2	3	4	Total
Owls	14	14	21	10	59
Cougars	7	7	21	14	49

=== Tulane ===
	1	2	3	4	Total
Green Wave	6	3	0	8	17
Cougars	14	17	10	7	48

=== At Memphis ===
	1	2	3	4	Total
Cougars	7	14	10	0	31
Tigers	3	14	14	21	52

=== Vs. Army (Armed Forces Bowl) ===
	1	2	3	4	Total
Cougars	0	7	0	7	14
No. 22 Black Knights	14	28	14	14	70

== Players drafted into the NFL ==
Round	Pick	Player	Position	NFL Club
1	9	Ed Oliver	DT	Buffalo Bills
4	129	Isaiah Johnson	CB	Oakland Raiders
6	200	Emeke Egbule	LB	Los Angeles Chargers

== Rankings ==
Ranking movements Legend: ██ Increase in ranking ██ Decrease in ranking — = Not ranked RV = Received votes
	Week															
Poll	Pre	1	2	3	4	5	6	7	8	9	10	11	12	13	14	Final
AP	RV	RV	RV	—	—	—	—	RV	RV	RV	17	RV	—	RV	—	—
Coaches	RV	RV	RV	RV	—	—	—	RV	RV	RV	17	RV	—	—	—	
CFP	Not released										—	—	—	—	—	Not released
