= 2018 Army Black Knights football team =

American college football season

2018 Army Black Knights football

Lambert-Meadowlands Trophy Armed Forces Bowl champion

Armed Forces Bowl, W 70–14 vs. Houston
- Conference: Independent

Ranking
- Coaches: No. 20
- AP: No. 19
- Record: 11–2
- Head coach: Jeff Monken (5th season)
- Offensive coordinator: Brent Davis (5th season)
- Offensive scheme: Triple option
- Defensive coordinator: Jay Bateman (5th season)
- Base defense: 3–4
- Captains: Cole Christiansen; Bryce Holland; Darnell Woolfolk
- Home stadium: Michie Stadium

2018 NCAA Division I FBS independents football records
	Conf.			Overall
Team	W		L	W		L
No. 5 Notre Dame ^		–		12	–	1
No. 19 Army		–		11	–	2
BYU		–		7	–	6
Liberty		–		6	–	6
UMass		–		4	–	8
New Mexico State		–		3	–	9
^ – College Football Playoff participant; Rankings from AP Poll

The 2018 Army Black Knights football team represented the United States Military Academy as an independent in the 2018 NCAA Division I FBS football season. The Black Knights were led by fifth-year head coach Jeff Monken and played their home games at Michie Stadium. Following their 28–14 victory over Colgate in Week 12, Army entered the AP Poll at No. 23 and the Coaches' Poll at No. 24, the first time Army had entered the national rankings since finishing the 1996 season at No. 25 in the AP and No. 24 in the Coaches'. On December 2, Army accepted an invite to participate in the Armed Forces Bowl against the Houston Cougars of the American Athletic Conference. On December 8, Army defeated its archrival Navy by a score of 17–10, increasing their Army–Navy Game win streak to three in a row and winning the Commander-in-Chief's Trophy for the second straight year. With the win the Black Knights also secured their second straight 10-win season, the first time that had been accomplished in the Academy's long and storied history. In the Armed Forces Bowl, they defeated Houston by a score of 70–14 to tie NCAA bowl game records for points scored and margin of victory. Their 11 wins are the most in one season in program history. As a result of his team's 2018 accomplishments, Coach Monken was awarded the George Munger Collegiate Coach of the Year Award by the Maxwell Football Club, the Vince Lombardi College Football Coach of the Year Award by the Lombardi Foundation, and the President's Award by the Touchdown Club of Columbus. Army finished the season with a ranking of No. 19 in the AP Poll and No. 20 in the Coaches' Poll, their highest finish in both polls since Pete Dawkins's Heisman Trophy-winning season in 1958 where the Cadets finished No. 3 in both polls. Following the completion of the season, the Black Knights were awarded the 2018 Lambert Trophy by the Eastern College Athletic Conference (ECAC) and Metropolitan New York Football Writers, signifying them as the best team in the East in Division I FBS. This was the eighth overall time the Lambert Trophy had been awarded to Army, and the first since 1958.

== Preseason ==
=== Award watch lists ===
Listed in the order that they were released

Award	Player	Position	Year
Rimington Trophy	Bryce Holland	C	SR
Maxwell Award	Darnell Woolfolk	FB	SR
Bronko Nagurski Trophy	James Nachtigal	LB	SR
Paul Hornung Award	Kell Walker	SB/KR	JR
Walter Camp Award	Darnell Woolfolk	FB	SR

== Personnel ==
=== Roster ===
2018 Army Black Knights roster
Quarterbacks: 2 Tyhier Tyler, Freshman; 4 Cam Thomas, Sophomore; 7 Matthew Armstrong, Freshman; 8 Kelvin Hopkins Jr., Junior; 9 Luke Langdon, Senior; 11 Jabari Laws, Freshman; 13 Christian Anderson, Sophomore; 17 Clay Czyzynski, Freshman; 18 Mike Mbony, Freshman; Slot backs: 3 Jordan Asberry, Senior; 5 Kell Walker, Junior; 10 Jordan Blackman, Sophomore; 15 JC Watson, Freshman; 16 Malik Hancock, Junior; 19 Dominic Distefano, Sophomore; 20 David Woodward, Freshman; 21 Zack Boobas, Sophomore; 21 Donnell Diego, Sophomore; 27 Brandon Walters, Freshman; 29 A.J. Howard, Freshman; 32 Artice Hobbs IV, Sophomore; 36 Krys Kyle, Freshman; 38 Ton Evans, Freshman; 42 Landry Songer, Freshman; 43 Markens Pierre, Freshman; 44 Chambo Liddell-Patacsil, Sophomore; Fullbacks: 22 Calen Holt, Senior; 25 Connor Slomka, Junior; 26 Cade Barnard, Freshman; 31 Sandon McCoy, Sophomore; 33 Darnell Woolfolk, Senior; 34 Rashaad Bolton, Junior; 40 Andy Davidson, Senior; 48 Kaelin Byrd, Freshman; Wide receivers: 6 Glen Coates, Junior; 14 Michael Roberts, Freshman; 30 Cameron Johnson, Freshman; 37 Sean Eckert, Freshman; 45 Daniel Zuloaga, Freshman; 80 Chris Gregg, Junior; 81 Ke'Shaun Wells, Sophomore; 82 Kjetil Cline, Junior; 84 Kevin Hamilton, Freshman; 86 Christian Hayes, Junior; 87 Kraig Hamilton, Freshman; 88 Camden Harrison, Sophomore; 89 Jalen Moy, Freshman; Long snappers: 40 Paul Lawless, Sophomore; 45 Brendan Knoespel, Freshman; 48 Kyle O'Connor, Sophomore; 49 Gavyn Jones, Freshman; 89 Scott Flanick, Senior	Tight ends: 39 Bryton Belvin, Freshman; 42 Ted Wages IV, Sophomore; 46 Chris Cameron, Freshman; 47 Jake Lauer, Sophomore; 83 Zach Saum, Senior; 85 Quinten Parker, Senior; Offensive Lineman: 50 Will Schumacher, Sophomore; 51 Kyle Perry, Freshman; 52 Sam Backenstoe, Freshman; 52 Nick Kotok, Freshman; 53 Jeff Panara, Senior; 54 Mason Kolinchak, Freshman; 55 JB Hunter, Sophomore; 56 Aaron Baudoux, Freshman; 57 Andrew Kraatz, Freshman; 58 Harmon Saint Germain, Freshman; 59 Mike Johnson, Junior; 60 Alex Herndon, Junior; 62 Jack Topping, Freshman; 63 Jake Baumert, Junior; 64 Will Huff, Junior; 65 Bryce Holland, Senior; 66 Noah Knapp, Freshman; 67 Dean Powell, Freshman; 68 Luke McCleery, Sophomore; 69 Dan Lord, Freshman; 70 Zack Ward, Freshman; 72 Kamaron Holloway, Freshman; 73 Jaxson Deaton, Junior; 74 Austin Schuffert, Senior; 75 Jack Sides, Junior; 76 Peyton Reeder, Sophomore; 77 Noah Utley, Junior; 79 Holton Greenfield, Freshman; Defensive line: 55 Edriece Patterson, Sophomore; 57 Jacob Covington, Junior; 59 Ke'Shawn Sullivan, Freshman; 60 Hunter Richard, Freshman; 63 Jon King, Sophomore; 65 Nolan Cockrill, Freshman; 66 Ryan Duran III, Freshman; 68 Scott Murphy, Freshman; 71 Nick Stokes, Sophomore; 77 Raymond Wright, Senior; 78 Ryan Matz, Freshman; 90 Jack Hough, Sophomore; 91 Wunmi Oyetuga, Senior; 92 Eddie Crutchfield, Freshman; 93 Rod Stoddard, Junior; 94 Alex Crawford, Sophomore; 95 Emmanuel Ukhueligbe, Sophomore; 96 Mackay Phillips, Sophomore; 97 Kwabena Bonsu, Freshman; 98 Connor Smith, Sophomore; 99 Cordarrell Davis, Senior	Linebackers: 11 Donavan Lynch, Junior; 15 Ryan Parker, Junior; 18 Jake Ellington, Junior; 19 James Nachtigal, Senior; 29 Chandler Ramirez, Senior; 34 Jack King, Junior; 36 Nate Jones, Freshman; 37 Aaron Jones, Sophomore; 39 Duncan Van Kouteren, Freshman; 40 Ray Gonzalez, Freshman; 43 Jeremiah Lowery, Sophomore; 44 Gavin Bassett, Sophomore; 45 Hayden Bollinger, Freshman; 46 Briar Bearss, Freshman; 47 Jon Rhattigan, Sophomore; 48 Wilson Catoe, Freshman; 49 Jake Killian, Freshman; 51 Kemonte Yow, Freshman; 52 Amadeo West, Junior; 53 Arik Smith, Freshman; 54 Cole Christiansen, Junior; 56 Kenneth Brinson, Senior; 58 Paul Stanley, Freshman; Defensive backs: 2 James Gibson, Senior; 4 Max Regan, Senior; 5 Ryan Velez, Junior; 6 Akyah Miranda, Freshman; 7 Jaylon McClinton, Junior; 8 Javhari Bourdeau, Sophomore; 10 Mike Reynolds, Senior; 13 Chris Skyers, Sophomore; 14 Jalen Sharp, Senior; 16 Tavores Pearson, Freshman; 20 Cam Jones, Junior; 21 Malkelm Morrison, Freshman; 21 Dean Ngendakuriyo, Sophomore; 22 Julian McDuffie, Freshman; 23 Elijah Riley, Junior; 25 Caleb John, Freshman; 26 Cameron Clarke, Freshman; 27 Wallace Barrett, Sophomore; 30 Morgan Ernst, Freshman; 31 Joe Stephenson, Sophomore; 32 Jonathan Andrews, Freshman; 33 Cedrick Cunningham Jr., Freshman; 38 Michael Williams, Freshman; 46 Luke Cameron, Freshman; 50 Chido Rwakonda, Freshman; Kickers: 1 Landon Salyers, Sophomore; 31 John Abercrombie, Senior; 38 Nick Schrage, Senior; 44 Miller Kronk, Freshman; 97 David Cooper, Junior; 98 Michael Leisle, Sophomore; 99 Bailey Schroeder, Freshman; Punters: 17 Zach Potter, Junior; 43 Brooks Hosea, Freshman; 46 Zach Harding, Freshman; 80 J.D. Mote, Senior; 96 Will Hetzinger, Freshman

== Schedule ==
Date	Time	Opponent	Rank	Site	TV	Result	Attendance
August 31	7:00 p.m.	at Duke		Wallace Wade Stadium; Durham, NC	ESPNU	L 14–34	26,017
September 8	12:00 p.m.	Liberty		Michie Stadium; West Point, NY	CBSSN	W 38–14	25,133
September 15	12:00 p.m.	Hawaii		Michie Stadium; West Point, NY	CBSSN	W 28–21	31,133
September 22	7:00 p.m.	at No. 5 Oklahoma		Gaylord Family Oklahoma Memorial Stadium; Norman, OK	FSN PPV	L 21–28 ^{OT}	87,177
September 29	12:00 p.m.	at Buffalo		University at Buffalo Stadium; Amherst, NY	CBSSN	W 42–13	23,671
October 13	3:30 p.m.	vs. San Jose State		Levi's Stadium; Santa Clara, CA	ESPNU	W 52–3	15,627
October 20	12:00 p.m.	Miami (OH)^{†}		Michie Stadium; West Point, NY	CBSSN	W 31–30 ^{2OT}	38,016
October 27	12:00 p.m.	at Eastern Michigan		Rynearson Stadium; Ypsilanti, MI	CBSSN	W 37–22	22,627
November 3	12:00 p.m.	Air Force		Michie Stadium; West Point, NY (Commander-in-Chief's Trophy)	CBSSN	W 17–14	38,502
November 10	12:00 p.m.	Lafayette		Michie Stadium; West Point, NY	CBSSN	W 31–13	31,286
November 17	12:00 p.m.	No. 8 (FCS) Colgate		Michie Stadium; West Point, NY	CBSSN	W 28–14	26,086
December 8	3:00 p.m.	vs. Navy	No. 22	Lincoln Financial Field; Philadelphia, PA (Army–Navy Game, Commander-in-Chief's Trophy, College GameDay)	CBS	W 17–10	66,729
December 22	3:30 p.m.	vs. Houston	No. 22	Amon G. Carter Stadium; Fort Worth, TX (Armed Forces Bowl)	ESPN	W 70–14	44,738
^{†}Homecoming; Rankings from AP Poll released prior to the game; All times are in Eastern time

== Rankings ==
Ranking movements Legend: ██ Increase in ranking ██ Decrease in ranking — = Not ranked RV = Received votes
	Week															
Poll	Pre	1	2	3	4	5	6	7	8	9	10	11	12	13	14	Final
AP	—	—	—	—	—	—	—	—	—	RV	RV	RV	23	23	22	19
Coaches	RV	—	—	—	RV	RV	RV	RV	RV	RV	RV	RV	24	25	25	20
CFP	Not released									—	—	—	—	—	—	Not released

== Game summaries ==
=== At Duke ===
Army Black Knights at Duke Blue Devils

Quarter	1	2	3	4	Total
Black Knights	0	0	14	0	14
Blue Devils	3	14	7	10	34

at Wallace Wade Stadium, Durham, NC

- Date: September 1, 2018
- Game time: 7:00 p.m. EDT
- Game weather: Temperature: 92 F • Wind: E 2 mph • Weather: Partly Cloudy
- Game attendance: 26,017
- Referee: Tra Blake
- TV announcers (ESPNU): Roy Philpott (Play-by-play) & Tom Ramsey (color)
- ESPN – Jones, Brown lead Duke past Army, 34–14, in opener /// Box Score, Army at Duke

Game information

First Quarter

- (09:54) DUKE FG: Collin Wareham 25-yard field goal; 7 plays, 25 yards, 2:57

Second Quarter

- (13:54) DUKE TD: Brittain Brown 12-yard rush (Collin Wareham kick); 9 plays, 80 yards, 3:37
- (08:27) DUKE TD: Daniel Jones 1-yard rush (Collin Wareham kick); 3 plays, 71 yards, 1:05

Third Quarter

- (05:44) ARMY TD: Kelvin Hopkins Jr. 3-yard rush (Landon Salyers kick); 11 plays, 55 yards, 6:14
- (03:13) DUKE TD: Deon Jackson 7-yard rush (Collin Wareham kick); 7 plays, 68 yards, 2:23
- (00:57) ARMY TD: Cam Harrison 45-yard pass from Kelvin Hopkins Jr. (Landon Salyers kick); 5 plays, 75 yards, 2:16

Fourth Quarter

- (13:27) DUKE TD: Aaron Young 25-yard pass from Daniel Jones (Collin Wareham kick); 6 plays, 69 yards, 2:27
- (03:59) DUKE FG: Collin Wareham 30-yard field goal; 5 plays, 56 yards, 2:48

Passing

- ARMY – Kelvin Hopkins Jr.: 10/21, 197 yds, 1 TD
- DUKE – Daniel Jones: 13/18, 197 yds, 1 TD

Rushing

- ARMY – Calen Holt: 7 att, 54 yds
- DUKE – Brittain Brown: 11 att, 75 yds, 1 TD

Receiving

- ARMY – Cam Harrison: 3 rec, 92 yds, 1 TD
- DUKE – Aaron Young: 4 rec, 114 yds, 1 TD

Statistics	ARMY	DUKE
First downs	18	19
3rd down efficiency	5–14	2–9
4th down efficiency	4–4	1–1
Plays–yards	68–365	52–381
Rushes–yards	47–168	35–184
Passing yards	197	197
Passing: Comp–Att–Int	10–21–0	13–17–0
Penalties–yards	7–69	4–30
Turnovers	2	1
Time of possession	36:06	23:54

=== Liberty ===
Liberty Flames at Army Black Knights

Quarter	1	2	3	4	Total
Flames	0	0	14	0	14
Black Knights	14	3	7	14	38

at Michie Stadium, West Point, NY

- Date: September 8, 2018
- Game time: 12:00 p.m. EDT
- Game weather: Temperature: 65 F • Wind: NNE 9 mph • Weather: Partly Cloudy
- Game attendance: 25,133
- Referee: Jeff Flanagan
- TV announcers (CBSSN): Ben Holden (Play-by-play), Jay Feely (color) & Tina Cervasio (sideline)
- ESPN – Army rushes for 449 yards, squashes Liberty 38–14 /// Box Score, Liberty at Army

Game information

First Quarter

- (03:11) ARMY TD: Calen Holt 25-yard rush (Landon Salyers kick); 8 plays, 81 yards, 4:09
- (01:27) ARMY TD: Darnell Woolfolk 26-yard rush (Landon Salyers kick); 2 plays, 31 yards, 0:43

Second Quarter

- (00:00) ARMY FG: Landon Salyers 42-yard field goal; 12 plays; 19 yards; 3:29

Third Quarter

- (13:40) ARMY TD: Christian Hayes 44-yard pass from Kelvin Hopkins Jr. (Landon Salyers kick); 3 plays, 75 yards, 1:20
- (13:05) LIBERTY TD: Damian King 28-yard pass from Stephen Calvert (Aaron Peart kick); 2 plays, 78 yards, 0:28
- (05:39) LIBERTY TD: B.J. Farrow 28-yard pass from Stephen Calvert (Aaron Peart kick); 13 plays, 85 yards, 3:50

Fourth Quarter

- (11:47) ARMY TD: Darnell Woolfolk 2-yard rush (Landon Salyers kick); 10 plays, 80 yards, 4:16
- (07:13) ARMY TD: Connor Slomka 2-yard rush (Landon Salyers kick); 9 plays, 51 yards, 4:28

Passing

- LIBERTY – Stephen Calvert: 19/37, 307 yds, 2 TD, 1 INT
- ARMY – Kelvin Hopkins Jr.: 2/7, 61 yds, 1 TD

Rushing

- LIBERTY – Kentory Matthews: 9 att, 81 yds
- ARMY – Darnell Woolfolk: 17 att, 98 yds, 2 TD

Receiving

- LIBERTY – Damian King: 8 rec, 172 yds, 1 TD
- ARMY – Christian Hayes: 1 rec, 44 yds, 1 TD

Statistics	LIB	ARMY
First downs	21	28
3rd down efficiency	5–12	6–14
4th down efficiency	0–1	2–2
Plays–yards	60–417	82–510
Rushes–yards	23–110	74–449
Passing yards	307	61
Passing: Comp–Att–Int	19–37–1	2–8–0
Penalties–yards	6–27	7–100
Turnovers	3	0
Time of possession	18:30	41:30

=== Hawaii ===
Hawaii Rainbow Warriors at Army Black Knights

Quarter	1	2	3	4	Total
Rainbow Warriors	7	7	0	7	21
Black Knights	7	14	0	7	28

at Michie Stadium, West Point, NY

- Date: September 15, 2018
- Game time: 12:00 p.m. EDT
- Game weather: Temperature: 72 F • Wind: S 1 mph • Weather: Clear
- Game attendance: 31,133
- Referee: Matt Overton
- TV announcers (CBSSN): Ben Holden (Play-by-play), Jay Feely (color) & Tina Cervasio (sideline)
- ESPN – Hopkins, Army knock off previously unbeaten Hawaii 28–21 /// Box Score, Hawai'i at Army

Game information

First Quarter

- (13:08) UH TD: John Ursua 12-yard pass from Cole McDonald (Ryan Meskell kick); 5 plays, 75 yards, 1:52
- (06:17) ARMY TD: Kelvin Hopkins Jr. 1-yard rush (Landon Salyers kick); 5 plays, 66 yards, 2:42

Second Quarter

- (12:47) ARMY TD: Kelvin Hopkins Jr. 1-yard rush (Landon Salyers kick); 14 plays, 64 yards, 7:28
- (07:05) UH TD: John Ursua 1-yard rush (Ryan Meskell kick); 9 plays, 65 yards, 5:32
- (03:46) ARMY TD: Connor Slomka 48-yard rush (Landon Salyers kick); 6 plays, 75 yards, 3:19

Third Quarter

No Scoring

Fourth Quarter

- (09:01) ARMY TD: Darnell Woolfolk 3-yard rush (Landon Salyers kick); 12 plays, 73 yards, 5:59
- (08:42) UH TD: John Ursua 80-yard pass from Cole McDonald (Ryan Meskell kick); 1 play, 80 yards, 0:13

Passing

- UH – Cole McDonald: 20/32, 321 yds, 2 TD
- ARMY – Kelvin Hopkins Jr.: 6/10, 162 yds

Rushing

- UH – Dayton Furuta: 3 att, 21 yds
- ARMY – Kelvin Hopkins Jr.: 20 att, 110 yds, 2 TD

Receiving

- UH – John Ursua: 6 rec, 123 yds, 2 TD
- ARMY – Christian Hayes: 2 rec, 43 yds

Statistics	HAW	ARMY
First downs	15	18
3rd down efficiency	1–7	11–19
4th down efficiency	0–2	3–4
Plays–yards	45–362	76–465
Rushes–yards	13–41	66–303
Passing yards	321	162
Passing: Comp–Att–Int	20–32–0	6–10–0
Penalties–yards	5–30	5–70
Turnovers	0	0
Time of possession	18:42	41:18

=== At Oklahoma ===
Army Black Knights at No. 5 Oklahoma Sooners

Quarter	1	2	3	4	OT	Total
Black Knights	7	7	7	0	0	21
No. 5 Sooners	14	7	0	0	7	28

at Gaylord Family Oklahoma Memorial Stadium, Norman, OK

- Date: September 22, 2018
- Game time: 6:05 p.m. CDT
- Game weather: Temperature: 71 F • Wind: NE 10 mph • Weather: Overcast
- Game attendance: 87,177
- Referee: Jerry Magallanes
- TV announcers (FSOK PPV): Brendan Burke (Play-by-play), Gary Reasons (color) & Christian Steckel (sideline)
- ESPN – No. 5 Oklahoma escapes with 28–21 OT win over Army /// Box Score, Army at #5 Oklahoma

Game information

First Quarter

- (12:20) OU TD: Carson Meier 11-yard pass from Kyler Murray (Austin Seibert kick); 6 plays, 68 yards, 2:40
- (02:49) ARMY TD: Connor Slomka 1-yard rush (John Abercrombie kick); 16 plays, 75 yards, 9:31
- (00:13) OU TD: CeeDee Lamb 11-yard pass from Kyler Murray (Austin Seibert kick); 6 plays, 65 yards, 2:36

Second Quarter

- (06:19) ARMY TD: Kelvin Hopkins Jr. 5-yard rush (John Abercrombie kick); 16 plays, 75 yards, 8:54
- (04:25) OU TD: Kyler Murray 33-yard rush (Austin Seibert kick); 4 plays, 66 yards, 1:54

Third Quarter

- (01:51) ARMY TD: Andy Davidson 3-yard rush (John Abercrombie kick); 19 plays, 85 yards, 10:47

Fourth Quarter

No Scoring

Overtime

- OU TD: CeeDee Lamb 10-yard pass from Kyler Murray (Austin Seibert kick); 2 plays, 30 yards

Passing

- ARMY – Kelvin Hopkins Jr.: 3/8, 40 yds, 2 INT
- OU – Kyler Murray: 11/15, 165 yds, 3 TD, 1 INT

Rushing

- ARMY – Kelvin Hopkins Jr.: 25 att, 102 yds, 1 TD
- OU – Trey Sermon: 18 att, 119 yds

Receiving

- ARMY – Kell Walker: 3 rec, 40 yds
- OU – Grant Calcaterra: 2 rec, 47 yds

Statistics	ARMY	OU
First downs	26	19
3rd down efficiency	13–21	1–3
4th down efficiency	4–5	0–1
Plays–yards	87–379	40–355
Rushes–yards	78–339	25–190
Passing yards	40	165
Passing: Comp–Att–Int	3–9–2	11–15–1
Penalties–yards	6–50	4–20
Turnovers	2	1
Time of possession	44:41	15:19

=== At Buffalo ===
Army Black Knights at Buffalo Bulls

Quarter	1	2	3	4	Total
Black Knights	7	14	7	14	42
Bulls	7	0	6	0	13

at University at Buffalo Stadium, Amherst, NY

- Date: September 29, 2018
- Game time: 12:00 p.m. EDT
- Game weather: Temperature: 58 F • Wind: WSW 10 mph • Weather: Overcast
- Game attendance: 23,671
- Referee: Tom Stapleton
- TV announcers (CBSSN): Dave Ryan (Play-by-play) & Corey Chavous (color)
- ESPN – Army's ground attack hands Buffalo its first loss, 42–13 /// Box Score, Army at Buffalo

Game information

First Quarter

- (13:49) UB TD: K. J. Osborn 53-yard pass from Tyree Jackson (Adam Mitcheson kick); 4 plays, 81 yards, 1:11
- (02:12) ARMY TD: Calen Holt 5-yard rush (John Abercrombie kick); 11 plays, 74 yards, 5:44

Second Quarter

- (07:53) ARMY TD: Connor Slomka 3-yard rush (John Abercrombie kick); 12 plays, 77 yards, 6:55
- (04:05) ARMY TD: Elijah Riley 80-yard blocked field goal return (John Abercrombie kick)

Third Quarter

- (07:55) UB TD: Kevin Marks 1-yard rush (Adam Mitcheson kick failed); 12 plays, 87 yards, 5:02
- (02:49) ARMY TD: Jordan Asberry 25-yard pass from Kelvin Hopkins Jr. (John Abercrombie kick); 10 plays, 75 yards, 5:06

Fourth Quarter

- (09:17) ARMY TD: Darnell Woolfolk 2-yard rush (John Abercrombie kick); 13 plays, 81 yards, 7:44
- (06:57) ARMY TD: Luke Langdon 27-yard rush (John Abercrombie kick); 3 plays, 31 yards, 0:52

Passing

- ARMY – Kelvin Hopkins Jr.: 4/5, 91 yds, 1 TD, 1 INT
- UB – Tyree Jackson: 10/24, 152 yds, 1 TD

Rushing

- ARMY – Kelvin Hopkins Jr.: 19 att, 89 yds
- UB – Emmanuel Reed: 16 att, 63 yds

Receiving

- ARMY – Cam Harrison: 1 rec, 37 yds
- UB – K. J. Osborn: 4 rec, 82 yds, 1 TD

Statistics	ARMY	UB
First downs	25	14
3rd down efficiency	9–14	2–11
4th down efficiency	3–3	0–2
Plays–yards	69–372	55–255
Rushes–yards	64–281	31–103
Passing yards	91	152
Passing: Comp–Att–Int	4–5–1	10–24–0
Penalties–yards	7–73	7–78
Turnovers	1	0
Time of possession	37:34	22:26

=== Vs. San Jose State ===
Army Black Knights vs. San Jose State Spartans

Quarter	1	2	3	4	Total
Black Knights	0	14	24	14	52
Spartans	3	0	0	0	3

at Levi's Stadium, Santa Clara, CA

- Date: October 13, 2018
- Game time: 12:30 p.m. PDT
- Game weather: Temperature: 77 F • Wind: N 5 mph • Weather: Sunny
- Game attendance: 15,627
- Referee: Kevin Hassell
- TV announcers (ESPNU): Mike Corey (Play-by-play) & Rene Ingoglia (color)
- ESPN – Hopkins scores 4 TDs to lead Army past San Jose State 52–3 /// Box Score, Army at San Jose State

Game information

First Quarter

- (04:14) SJSU FG: Bryce Crawford 49-yard field goal; 13 plays, 46 yards, 6:37

Second Quarter

- (14:53) ARMY TD: Jordan Asberry 41-yard pass from Kelvin Hopkins Jr. (John Abercrombie kick); 8 plays, 75 yards, 4:21
- (00:12) ARMY TD: Kelvin Hopkins Jr. 1-yard rush (John Abercrombie kick); 12 plays, 57 yards, 6:22

Third Quarter

- (09:06) ARMY TD: Kelvin Hopkins Jr. 24-yard rush (John Abercrombie kick); 11 plays, 75 yards, 5:54
- (07:39) ARMY FG: John Abercrombie 33-yard field goal; 4 plays, 3 yards, 1:22
- (06:18) ARMY TD: Darnell Woolfolk 1-yard rush (John Abercrombie kick); 2 plays, 10 yards, 1:12
- (01:44) ARMY TD: Kelvin Hopkins Jr. 4-yard rush (John Abercrombie kick); 8 plays, 35 yards, 3:31

Fourth Quarter

- (14:32) ARMY TD: James Nachtigal 52-yard fumble recovery (John Abercrombie kick)
- (05:05) ARMY TD: Cam Thomas 28-yard rush (John Abercrombie kick); 9 plays, 80 yards, 4:59

Passing

- ARMY – Kelvin Hopkins Jr.: 2/5, 54 yds, 1 TD
- SJSU – Montel Aaron: 12/17, 118 yds

Rushing

- ARMY – Kelvin Hopkins Jr.: 18 att, 99 yds, 3 TD
- SJSU – Tyler Nevens: 11 att, 43 yds

Receiving

- ARMY – Jordan Asberry: 1 rec, 41 yds, 1 TD
- SJSU – Thai Cottrell: 3 rec, 27 yds

Statistics	ARMY	SJSU
First downs	23	10
3rd down efficiency	10–16	4–11
4th down efficiency	3–3	0–0
Plays–yards	70–395	48–171
Rushes–yards	65–341	30–36
Passing yards	54	135
Passing: Comp–Att–Int	2–5–0	13–18–0
Penalties–yards	3–15	7–55
Turnovers	0	4
Time of possession	37:17	22:43

=== Miami (OH) ===
Miami (OH) RedHawks at Army Black Knights

Quarter	1	2	3	4	OT	2OT	Total
RedHawks	0	7	0	14	3	6	30
Black Knights	7	7	7	0	3	7	31

at Michie Stadium, West Point, NY

- Date: October 20, 2018
- Game time: 12:00 p.m. EDT
- Game weather: Temperature: 58 F • Wind: W 9 mph • Weather: Clear
- Game attendance: 38,016
- Referee: Amanda Sauer
- TV announcers (CBSSN): Ben Holden (Play-by-play), Jay Feely (color) & Tina Cervasio (sideline)
- ESPN – Army holds off Miami of Ohio 31–30 in double overtime /// Box Score, Miami (OH) at Army

Game information

First Quarter

- (07:05) ARMY TD: Darnell Woolfolk 2-yard rush (John Abercrombie kick); 12 plays, 54 yards, 6:51

Second Quarter

- (09:55) ARMY TD: Andy Davidson 11-yard rush (John Abercrombie kick); 15 plays, 74 yards, 8:30
- (07:40) MIAMI TD: Kenny Young 34-yard pass from Gus Ragland (Sam Sloman kick); 4 plays, 52 yards, 2:00

Third Quarter

- (00:08) ARMY TD: Cam Thomas 1-yard rush (John Abercrombie kick); 8 plays, 80 yards, 4:23

Fourth Quarter

- (04:23) MIAMI TD: Dom Robinson 3-yard pass from Gus Ragland (Sam Sloman kick); 8 plays, 68 yards, 1:54
- (00:17) MIAMI TD: Nate Becker 5-yard pass from Gus Ragland (Sam Sloman kick); 16 plays, 82 yards, 3:11

1st Overtime

- MIAMI FG: Sam Sloman 33-yard field goal; 7 plays, 10 yards
- ARMY FG: John Abercrombie 37-yard field goal; 7 plays, 5 yards

2nd Overtime

- ARMY TD: Darnell Woolfolk 7-yard rush (John Abercrombie kick); 4 plays, 25 yards
- MIAMI TD: Luke Mayock 18-yard pass from Gus Ragland (Gus Ragland pass failed); 6 plays, 25 yards

Passing

- MIAMI – Gus Ragland: 30/53, 329 yds, 4 TD
- ARMY – Cam Thomas: 0/2, 0 yds

Rushing

- MIAMI – Gus Ragland: 14 att, 56 yds
- ARMY – Cam Thomas: 26 att, 137 yds, 1 TD

Receiving

- MIAMI – Jack Sorenson: 5 rec, 75 yds
- ARMY – No Receptions

Statistics	MIAMI	ARMY
First downs	23	20
3rd down efficiency	5–18	8–17
4th down efficiency	7–9	3–4
Plays–yards	80–406	76–347
Rushes–yards	27–77	74–347
Passing yards	329	0
Passing: Comp–Att–Int	30–53–0	0–2–0
Penalties–yards	8–56	1–5
Turnovers	0	0
Time of possession	23:52	36:08

=== At Eastern Michigan ===
Army Black Knights at Eastern Michigan Eagles

Quarter	1	2	3	4	Total
Black Knights	3	13	7	14	37
Eagles	0	0	14	8	22

at Rynearson Stadium, Ypsilanti, MI

- Date: October 27, 2018
- Game time: 12:00 p.m. EDT
- Game weather: Temperature: 45 F • Wind: N 5 mph • Weather: Sunny
- Game attendance: 22,627
- Referee: Curt Johnson
- TV announcers (CBSSN): Ben Holden (Play-by-play) & Ross Tucker (color)
- ESPN – Army bowl eligible for record 3rd straight season /// Box Score, Army at Eastern Michigan

Game information

First Quarter

- (02:56) ARMY FG: John Abercrombie 24-yard field goal; 19 plays, 64 yards, 10:28

Second Quarter

- (08:37) ARMY FG: John Abercrombie 23-yard field goal; 12 plays, 74 yards, 6:43
- (02:25) ARMY FG: John Abercrombie 27-yard field goal; 8 plays, 48 yards, 4:40
- (00:18) ARMY TD: Jordan Asberry 3-yard rush (John Abercrombie kick); 5 plays, 62 yards, 1:17

Third Quarter

- (11:20) EMU TD: Mathew Sexton 4-yard pass from Tyler Wiegers (Tyler Wiegers pass from Isaac Holder); 6 plays, 46 yards, 1:44
- (09:00) EMU TD: Blake Banham 58-yard pass from Tyler Wiegers (Tyler Wiegers pass failed); 3 plays, 58 yards, 0:20
- (03:40) ARMY TD: Jordan Asberry 26-yard pass from Kelvin Hopkins Jr. (John Abercrombie kick); 10 plays, 75 yards, 5:20

Fourth Quarter

- (11:26) ARMY TD: Kell Walker 2-yard pass from Kelvin Hopkins Jr. (John Abercrombie kick); 11 plays, 43 yards, 6:49
- (07:03) EMU TD: Blake Banham 1-yard rush (Blake Banham pass from Tyler Wiegers); 11 plays, 75 yards, 4:23
- (00:45) ARMY TD: Darnell Woolfolk 9-yard rush (John Abercrombie kick); 12 plays, 84 yards, 6:18

Passing

- ARMY – Kelvin Hopkins Jr.: 7/8, 126 yds, 2 TD
- EMU – Tyler Wiegers: 19/29, 201 yds, 2 TD

Rushing

- ARMY – Kelvin Hopkins Jr.: 23 att, 100 yds
- EMU – Tyler Wiegers: 5 att, 26 yds

Receiving

- ARMY – Jordan Asberry: 2 rec, 57 yds, 1 TD
- EMU – Blake Banham: 7 rec, 104 yds, 1 TD

Statistics	ARMY	EMU
First downs	27	10
3rd down efficiency	10–19	1–7
4th down efficiency	4–4	1–2
Plays–yards	81–415	40–235
Rushes–yards	73–289	11–34
Passing yards	126	201
Passing: Comp–Att–Int	7–8–0	19–29–0
Penalties–yards	3–25	8–75
Turnovers	0	1
Time of possession	45:42	14:18

=== Air Force ===
Air Force Falcons at Army Black Knights

Quarter	1	2	3	4	Total
Falcons	0	0	6	8	14
Black Knights	7	7	0	3	17

at Michie Stadium, West Point, NY

- Date: November 3, 2018
- Game time: 12:00 p.m. EDT
- Game weather: Temperature: 53 F • Wind: W 19 mph • Weather: Cloudy, chilly
- Game attendance: 38,502
- Referee: Mike Defee
- TV announcers (CBSSN): Ben Holden (Play-by-play), Jay Feely (color) & Tina Cervasio (sideline)
- ESPN – Army holds off Air Force 17-14, 11th straight win at home /// Box Score, Air Force at Army

Game information

First Quarter

- (02:05) ARMY TD: Darnell Woolfolk 1-yard rush (John Abercrombie kick); 21 plays, 75 yards, 12:55

Second Quarter

- (04:03) ARMY TD: Kelvin Hopkins Jr. 6-yard rush (John Abercrombie kick); 11 plays, 89 yards, 6:47

Third Quarter

- (00:54) AFA TD: Donald Hammond III 1-yard rush (Jake Koehnke kick failed); 9 plays, 34 yards, 3:50

Fourth Quarter

- (08:35) ARMY FG: John Abercrombie 30-yard field goal; 13 plays, 62 yards, 7:19
- (05:27) AFA TD: Joseph Saucier 6-yard rush (Joseph Saucier rush); 10 plays, 75 yards, 3:08

Passing

- AFA – Donald Hammond III: 7/15, 120 yds
- ARMY – Kelvin Hopkins Jr.: 3/5, 44 yds

Rushing

- AFA – Cole Fagan: 10 att, 37 yds
- ARMY – Darnell Woolfolk: 21 att, 117 yds, 1 TD

Receiving

- AFA – Geraud Sanders: 3 rec, 55 yds
- ARMY – Jordan Asberry: 2 rec, 35 yds

Statistics	AFA	ARMY
First downs	17	16
3rd down efficiency	3–9	8–16
4th down efficiency	1–3	3–3
Plays–yards	57–322	64–286
Rushes–yards	35–125	59–242
Passing yards	197	44
Passing: Comp–Att–Int	12–22–1	3–5–0
Penalties–yards	5–55	5–69
Turnovers	1	0
Time of possession	22:28	37:32

=== Lafayette ===
Lafayette Leopards at Army Black Knights

Quarter	1	2	3	4	Total
Leopards	3	3	0	7	13
Black Knights	3	14	14	0	31

at Michie Stadium, West Point, NY

- Date: November 10, 2018
- Game time: 12:00 p.m. EST
- Game weather: Temperature: 43 F • Wind: WNW 11 mph • Weather: Partly cloudy
- Game attendance: 31,286
- Referee: Riley Johnson
- TV announcers (CBSSN): Ben Holden (Play-by-play), Jay Feely (color) & Tina Cervasio (sideline)
- ESPN – Woolfolk scores twice, Army beats Lafayette 31-13 /// Box Score, Lafayette at Army

Game information

First Quarter

- (04:41) ARMY FG: John Abercrombie 25-yard field goal; 16 plays, 67 yards, 10:19
- (02:22) LAFAYETTE FG: Jeffrey Kordenbrock 42-yard field goal; 4 plays, -2 yards, 1:15

Second Quarter

- (12:26) ARMY TD: Darnell Woolfolk 1-yard rush (John Abercrombie kick); 10 plays, 75 yards, 4:56
- (00:41) ARMY TD: Calen Holt 8-yard rush (John Abercrombie kick); 12 plays, 94 yards, 6:35
- (00:00) LAFAYETTE FG: Jeffrey Kordenbrock 43-yard field goal; 6 plays, 35 yards, 0:35

Third Quarter

- (09:27) ARMY TD: Darnell Woolfolk 1-yard rush (John Abercrombie kick); 1 play, 1 yard, 0:05
- (01:47) ARMY TD: Kelvin Hopkins Jr. 2-yard rush (John Abercrombie kick); 11 plays, 77 yards, 6:27

Fourth Quarter

- (09:40) LAFAYETTE TD: Will Eisler 3-yard pass from Sean O'Malley (Jeffrey Kordenbrock kick); 12 plays, 75 yards, 7:07

Passing

- LAFAYETTE – Sean O'Malley: 9/16, 76 yds, 1 TD
- ARMY – Kelvin Hopkins Jr.: 5/6, 95 yds

Rushing

- LAFAYETTE – C.J. Amill: 12 att, 43 yds
- ARMY – Darnell Woolfolk: 12 att, 69 yds, 2 TD

Receiving

- LAFAYETTE – C.J. Amill: 4 rec, 26 yds
- ARMY – Glen Coates: 2 rec, 43 yds

Statistics	LAF	ARMY
First downs	9	23
3rd down efficiency	2–8	12–13
4th down efficiency	1–1	0–0
Plays–yards	40–159	63–408
Rushes–yards	24–83	57–313
Passing yards	76	95
Passing: Comp–Att–Int	9–16–0	5–6–0
Penalties–yards	1–5	6–40
Turnovers	0	1
Time of possession	21:58	38:02

=== Colgate ===
No. 8 (FCS) Colgate Raiders at Army Black Knights

Quarter	1	2	3	4	Total
No. 8 (FCS) Raiders	0	0	7	7	14
Black Knights	7	7	0	14	28

at Michie Stadium, West Point, NY

- Date: November 17, 2018
- Game time: 12:00 p.m. EST
- Game weather: Temperature: 44 F • Wind: W 11 mph • Weather: Overcast
- Game attendance: 26,086
- Referee: Jeff Maconaghy
- TV announcers (CBSSN): Ben Holden (Play-by-play), Jay Feely (color) & Tina Cervasio (sideline)
- ESPN – Woolfolk scores 3 times, Army holds off Colgate 28-14 /// Box Score, #8 (FCS) Colgate at Army

Game information

First Quarter

- (08:14) ARMY TD: Kelvin Hopkins Jr. 3-yard rush (John Abercrombie kick); 8 plays, 51 yards, 4:39

Second Quarter

- (08:05) ARMY TD: Darnell Woolfolk 2-yard rush (John Abercrombie kick); 16 plays, 76 yards, 9:27

Third Quarter

- (05:52) COLGATE TD: Tyler Castillo 35-yard fumble recovery (Chris Puzzi kick)

Fourth Quarter

- (14:58) ARMY TD: Darnell Woolfolk 1-yard rush (John Abercrombie kick); 11 plays, 63 yards, 5:45
- (09:26) COLGATE TD: James Holland 10-yard rush (Chris Puzzi kick); 10 plays, 79 yards, 5:24
- (02:06) ARMY TD: Darnell Woolfolk 3-yard rush (John Abercrombie kick); 13 plays, 75 yards, 7:20

Passing

- COLGATE – Sage Attwood: 11/16, 63 yds
- ARMY – Kelvin Hopkins Jr.: 2/6, 25 yds

Rushing

- COLGATE – James Holland: 18 att, 166 yds, 1 TD
- ARMY – Kelvin Hopkins Jr.: 19 att, 90 yds, 1 TD

Receiving

- COLGATE – Thomas Ives: 3 rec, 27 yds
- ARMY – Jordan Asberry: 1 rec, 17 yds

Statistics	GATE	ARMY
First downs	13	21
3rd down efficiency	2–8	8–12
4th down efficiency	0–2	1–1
Plays–yards	44–251	65–286
Rushes–yards	28–188	59–261
Passing yards	63	25
Passing: Comp–Att–Int	11–16–0	2–6–0
Penalties–yards	7–55	3–25
Turnovers	1	1
Time of possession	24:04	35:56

=== Vs. Navy ===
No. 22 Army Black Knights vs. Navy Midshipmen (119th Army–Navy Game)

Quarter	1	2	3	4	Total
Midshipmen	0	0	0	10	10
No. 22 Black Knights	7	0	3	7	17

at Lincoln Financial Field, Philadelphia, PA

- Date: December 8, 2018
- Game time: 3:00 p.m. EST
- Game weather: Temperature: 36 F • Wind: - mph • Weather: Partly cloudy
- Game attendance: 66,729
- Referee: Jerry Magallanes
- TV announcers (CBS): Brad Nessler (Play-by-play), Gary Danielson (color) & Jamie Erdahl (sideline)
- ESPN – Army earns victory over Navy as Trump looks on /// Box Score, #22 Army vs. Navy (119th Army-Navy Game)

Game information

First Quarter

- (12:34) ARMY TD: Kelvin Hopkins Jr. 10-yard rush (John Abercrombie kick); 5 plays, 82 yards, 2:26

Second Quarter

No Scoring

Third Quarter

- (04:33) ARMY FG: John Abercrombie 33-yard field goal; 14 plays, 64 yards, 8:19

Fourth Quarter

- (07:10) NAVY TD: Garret Lewis 1-yard rush (Bennett Moehring kick); 4 plays, 48 yards, 1:52
- (01:28) ARMY TD: Kelvin Hopkins Jr. 1-yard rush (John Abercrombie kick); 4 plays, 22 yards, 1:34
- (00:29) NAVY FG: Bennett Moehring 46-yard field goal; 10 plays, 47 yards, 0:59

Passing

- NAVY – Garret Lewis: 5/11, 81 yds
- ARMY – Kelvin Hopkins Jr.: 4/9, 61 yds

Rushing

- NAVY – Malcolm Perry: 6 att, 52 yds
- ARMY – Kelvin Hopkins Jr.: 18 att, 64 yds, 2 TD

Receiving

- NAVY – Keoni Makekau: 2 rec, 52 yds
- ARMY – Kell Walker: 2 rec, 30 yds

Statistics	NAVY	ARMY
First downs	11	12
3rd down efficiency	3–13	5–14
4th down efficiency	2–3	1–3
Plays–yards	54–208	59–283
Rushes–yards	37–127	50–222
Passing yards	81	61
Passing: Comp–Att–Int	5–17–2	4–9–0
Penalties–yards	5–30	3–25
Turnovers	4	0
Time of possession	25:39	34:21

=== Vs. Houston – Armed Forces Bowl ===
Houston Cougars vs. No. 22 Army Black Knights (2018 Lockheed Martin Armed Forces Bowl)

Quarter	1	2	3	4	Total
Cougars	0	7	0	7	14
No. 22 Black Knights	14	28	14	14	70

at Amon G. Carter Stadium, Fort Worth, TX

- Date: December 22, 2018
- Game time: 2:30 p.m. CST
- Game weather: Temperature: 65 F • Wind: W 12 mph • Weather: Partly cloudy
- Game attendance: 44,738
- Referee: Luke Richmond
- TV announcers (ESPN): Chris Cotter (play-by-play), Jim L. Mora (color), Emmanuel Acho (field analyst) & Quint Kessenich (sideline)
- ESPN – Army ties bowl blowout record in 56-point rout /// Box Score, Houston vs #22 Army (2018 Lockheed Martin Armed Forces Bowl)

Game information

First Quarter

- (03:58) ARMY TD: Kelvin Hopkins Jr. 1-yard rush (John Abercrombie kick); 14 plays, 80 yards, 7:47
- (00:00) ARMY TD: Kelvin Hopkins Jr. 77-yard rush (John Abercrombie kick); 2 plays, 80 yards, 0:51

Second Quarter

- (14:46) ARMY TD: Cameron Jones 23-yard fumble return (John Abercrombie kick)
- (12:04) HOU TD: Romello Brooker 3-yard pass from Clayton Tune (Dalton Witherspoon kick); 9 plays, 77 yards, 2:34
- (10:46) ARMY TD: Kelvin Hopkins Jr. 1-yard rush (John Abercrombie kick); 3 plays, 62 yards, 1:18
- (07:24) ARMY TD: Kelvin Hopkins Jr. 2-yard rush (John Abercrombie kick); 3 plays, 8 yards, 1:22
- (00:51) ARMY TD: Artice Hobbs IV 11-yard rush (John Abercrombie kick); 8 plays, 69 yards, 4:33

Third Quarter

- (12:09) ARMY TD: Kelvin Hopkins Jr. 1-yard rush (John Abercrombie kick); 5 plays, 47 yards, 2:43
- (01:21) ARMY TD: Connor Slomka 3-yard rush (John Abercrombie kick); 6 plays, 35 yards, 3:21

Fourth Quarter

- (10:31) ARMY TD: Jordan Asberry 15-yard pass from Cam Thomas (John Abercrombie kick); 8 plays, 54 yards, 4:59
- (06:25) HOU TD: Clayton Tune 6-yard rush (Dalton Witherspoon kick); 13 plays, 74 yards, 4:03
- (01:58) ARMY TD: Cam Thomas 20-yard rush (John Abercrombie kick); 7 plays, 75 yards, 4:27

Passing

- HOU – Clayton Tune: 21/32, 230 yds, 1 TD
- ARMY – Kelvin Hopkins Jr.: 3/3, 70 yds

Rushing

- HOU – Patrick Carr: 9 att, 52 yds
- ARMY – Kelvin Hopkins Jr.: 11 att, 170 yds, 5 TD

Receiving

- HOU – Marquez Stevenson: 8 rec, 72 yds
- ARMY – Kjetil Cline: 1 rec, 54 yds

Statistics	HOU	ARMY
First downs	23	27
3rd down efficiency	3–13	7–7
4th down efficiency	2–3	0–0
Plays–yards	73–320	62–592
Rushes–yards	41–90	58–507
Passing yards	230	85
Passing: Comp–Att–Int	21–32–0	4–4–0
Penalties–yards	5–33	7–60
Turnovers	2	1
Time of possession	24:55	35:05
