= 2018 Armed Forces Bowl =

College football bowl game

2018 Lockheed Martin Armed Forces Bowl
- 16th Armed Forces Bowl
| Houston Cougars | Army Black Knights |
| (8–4) | (10–2) |
| The American | Independent |
| 14 | 70 |
| Head coach: Major Applewhite | Head coach: Jeff Monken |
| | AP / Coaches; 22 / 25 |
| | 1 | 2 | 3 | 4 | Total |
|---|---|---|---|---|---|
| Houston | 0 | 7 | 0 | 7 | 14 |
| Army | 14 | 28 | 14 | 14 | 70 |
- Date: December 22, 2018
- Season: 2018
- Stadium: Amon G. Carter Stadium
- Location: Fort Worth, Texas
- MVP: Kelvin Hopkins (QB, Army) & Romello Brooker (TE, Houston)
- Favorite: Army by 3
- Referee: Luke Richmond (MAC)
- Attendance: 44,738
- Payout: US$900,000

United States TV coverage
- Network: ESPN
- Announcers: Chris Cotter, Emmanuel Acho, Jim Mora and Quint Kessenich

International TV coverage
- Network: ESPN Deportes

The 2018 Armed Forces Bowl was a college football bowl game played on December 22, 2018. It was the 16th edition of the Armed Forces Bowl, and one of the 2018–19 bowl games concluding the 2018 FBS football season. The game was officially named the Lockheed Martin Armed Forces Bowl after its corporate sponsor Lockheed Martin. On December 18, it was announced that the game had officially sold out of tickets, the first such sellout in the Armed Forces Bowl's 16-year history.

Army's 70–14 victory tied the then largest margin of victory in a bowl game, 56, set by Tulsa in the 2008 GMAC Bowl when they defeated Bowling Green 63–7. Army's 70 points tied the record for most points in an FBS bowl game, set by West Virginia in the 2012 Orange Bowl, when they defeated Clemson 70–33. The then-tied record of largest margin of victory in a bowl game would go on to be broken in the 2023 National Championship game, where Georgia would defeat TCU by a final score of 65–7.

== Teams ==
The bowl originally planned to invite teams from the Big 12 Conference and the American Athletic Conference (The American). When fourth-ranked Oklahoma was selected for the College Football Playoff, a Big 12 bowl tie-in was left open. Army, an FBS Independent, was selected to fill this opening, facing off with The American member Houston.

=== Army Black Knights ===
Army received and accepted a bid to the Armed Forces Bowl on December 2. The Black Knights subsequently won the Army–Navy Game on December 8, and entered the bowl with a 10–2 record.

=== Houston Cougars ===
Houston received and accepted a bid to the Armed Forces Bowl on December 2. The Cougars entered the bowl with a 8–4 record (5–3 in conference).

== Game summary ==
=== Scoring summary ===
Scoring summary

| Quarter | Time | Drive | | | Team | Scoring information | Score | |
| Quarter | Time | Plays | Yards | TOP | Team | Scoring information | HOU | ARMY |
|---|---|---|---|---|---|---|---|---|
| 1 | 3:58 | 14 | 80 | 7:47 | ARMY | Kelvin Hopkins Jr. 1-yard touchdown run, John Abercrombie kick good | 0 | 7 |
| 1 | 0:00 | 2 | 80 | 0:50 | ARMY | Kelvin Hopkins Jr. 77-yard touchdown run, John Abercrombie kick good | 0 | 14 |
| 2 | 14:46 | | | | ARMY | Fumble recovery returned 23 yards for touchdown by Cameron Jones, John Abercrombie kick good | 0 | 21 |
| 2 | 12:04 | 9 | 77 | 2:42 | HOU | Romello Booker 3-yard touchdown reception from Clayton Tune, Dalton Witherspoon kick good | 7 | 21 |
| 2 | 10:46 | 3 | 62 | 1:18 | ARMY | Kelvin Hopkins Jr. 1-yard touchdown run, John Abercrombie kick good | 7 | 28 |
| 2 | 7:24 | 3 | 8 | 1:22 | ARMY | Kelvin Hopkins Jr. 2-yard touchdown run, John Abercrombie kick good | 7 | 35 |
| 2 | 0:51 | 8 | 69 | 4:33 | ARMY | Artice Hobbs IV 11-yard touchdown run, John Abercrombie kick good | 7 | 42 |
| 3 | 12:09 | 5 | 47 | 2:51 | ARMY | Kelvin Hopkins Jr. 1-yard touchdown run, John Abercrombie kick good | 7 | 49 |
| 3 | 1:21 | 6 | 35 | 3:21 | ARMY | Connor Slomka 3-yard touchdown run, John Abercrombie kick good | 7 | 56 |
| 4 | 10:31 | 8 | 54 | 4:59 | ARMY | Jordan Asberry 15-yard touchdown reception from Cam Thomas, John Abercrombie kick good | 7 | 63 |
| 4 | 6:25 | 13 | 74 | 4:06 | HOU | Clayton Tune 6-yard touchdown run, Dalton Witherspoon kick good | 14 | 63 |
| 4 | 1:58 | 7 | 75 | 4:27 | ARMY | Cam Thomas 20-yard touchdown run, John Abercrombie kick good | 14 | 70 |
| "TOP" = time of possession. For other American football terms, see Glossary of American football. | | | | | | | 14 | 70 |

=== Statistics ===
| | 1 | 2 | 3 | 4 | Total |
|---|---|---|---|---|---|
| Cougars | 0 | 7 | 0 | 7 | 14 |
| No. 22 Black Knights | 14 | 28 | 14 | 14 | 70 |

| Statistics | HOU | ARMY |
|---|---|---|
| First downs | 23 | 27 |
| Plays–yards | 73–317 | 62–592 |
| Rushes–yards | 41–87 | 58–507 |
| Passing yards | 230 | 85 |
| Passing: Comp–Att–Int | 21–32–0 | 4–4–0 |
| Time of possession | 24:55 | 35:05 |

| Team | Category | Player | Statistics |
|---|---|---|---|
| Houston | Passing | Clayton Tune | 21/32, 230 yds, 1 TD |
| Houston | Rushing | Patrick Carr | 9 car, 52 yds |
| Houston | Receiving | Marquez Stevenson | 8 rec, 72 yds |
| Army | Passing | Kelvin Hopkins Jr. | 3/3, 70 yds |
| Army | Rushing | Kelvin Hopkins Jr. | 11 car, 170 yds, 5 TD |
| Army | Receiving | Jordan Asberry | 2 rec, 22 yds, 1 TD |

== Records set or tied ==
NCAA FBS

- Margin of victory in a bowl game (tied): 56 points by Army (tied with Tulsa in its 63–7 win over Bowling Green in the 2008 GMAC Bowl)
- Most points scored by a single team in a bowl game (tied): 70 points by Army (tied with West Virginia in its 70–33 win over Clemson in the 2012 Orange Bowl)

Armed Forces Bowl

- Most points scored: 70, Army vs. Houston
- Largest margin of victory: 56, Army vs. Houston
- Most team total yards: 592, Army vs. Houston
- Most team rushing yards: 507, Army vs. Houston
- Most team sacks: 10, Army vs. Houston
- Most rushing touchdowns by an individual: 5, by Kelvin Hopkins Jr. of Army
- Most sacks by an individual: 3.5, by James Nachtigal of Army
- Largest attendance of Armed Forces Bowl Game: 44,738

Army (football program)

- Most wins in a season: 11
- Most rushing TDs by an individual in a game (tied): 5 by Kelvin Hopkins Jr.
- Most rushing TDs by an individual in a season (tied): 17 by Kelvin Hopkins Jr.
- Most TDs responsible for by an individual in a season (tied): 23 (6 passing, 17 rushing) by Kelvin Hopkins Jr.
- Total offense by an individual in a season: 2,143 yards (1,026 passing, 1,117 rushing) by Kelvin Hopkins Jr.
