= 2018 Navy Midshipmen football team =

American college football season

2018 Navy Midshipmen football
- Conference: American Athletic Conference
- West Division
- Record: 3–10 (2–6 AAC)
- Head coach: Ken Niumatalolo (11th season)
- Offensive coordinator: Ivin Jasper (11th season)
- Offensive scheme: Triple option
- Defensive coordinator: Dale Pehrson (3rd season)
- Base defense: Multiple
- MVP: Malcolm Perry
- Captains: Anthony Gargiulo; Sean Williams
- Home stadium: Navy–Marine Corps Memorial Stadium

2018 American Athletic Conference football standings
	Conf.			Overall
Team	W		L	W		L
East Division
No. 11 UCF x$	8	–	0	12	–	1
Temple	7	–	1	8	–	5
No. 24 Cincinnati	6	–	2	11	–	2
South Florida	3	–	5	7	–	6
East Carolina	1	–	7	3	–	9
UConn	0	–	8	1	–	11
West Division
Memphis xy	5	–	3	8	–	6
Houston x	5	–	3	8	–	5
Tulane x	5	–	3	7	–	6
SMU	4	–	4	5	–	7
Navy	2	–	6	3	–	10
Tulsa	2	–	6	3	–	9
Championship: UCF 56, Memphis 41
$ – Conference champion; x – Division champion/co-champions; y – Championship game participant; Rankings from AP Poll

The 2018 Navy Midshipmen football team represented the United States Naval Academy in the 2018 NCAA Division I FBS football season. The Midshipmen were led by eleventh-year head coach Ken Niumatalolo and played their home games at Navy–Marine Corps Memorial Stadium. Navy was a member of the American Athletic Conference (AAC) in the West Division. The Midshipmen finished the season 3–10, the team's worst record since 2002. They went 2–6 in AAC play to tie fifth place in the West Division.

== Preseason ==
=== Award watch lists ===
Listed in the order that they were released

Award	Player	Position	Year
Lott Trophy	Sean Williams	S	SR
Maxwell Award	Malcolm Perry	QB	JR
Paul Hornung Award	Malcolm Perry	QB	JR
Wuerffel Trophy	Andrew Wood	OL	SR
Walter Camp Award	Malcolm Perry	QB	JR

=== AAC media poll ===
The AAC media poll was released on July 24, 2018, with the Midshipmen predicted to finish in third place in the AAC West Division.

Media poll (West)
Predicted finish	Team	Votes (1st place)
1	Memphis	171 (23)
2	Houston	146 (4)
3	Navy	129 (3)
4	SMU	72
5	Tulane	68
6	Tulsa	44

== Schedule ==
Date	Time	Opponent	Site	TV	Result	Attendance
September 1	11:00 p.m.	at Hawaii*	Aloha Stadium; Honolulu, HI	CBSSN	L 41–59	29,702
September 8	3:30 p.m.	Memphis	Navy–Marine Corps Memorial Stadium; Annapolis, MD	CBSSN	W 22–21	31,762
September 15	3:30 p.m.	Lehigh*	Navy–Marine Corps Memorial Stadium; Annapolis, MD	CBSSN	W 51–21	30,011
September 22	12:00 p.m.	at SMU	Gerald J. Ford Stadium; Dallas, TX (Gansz Trophy)	ESPNews	L 30–31 ^{OT}	17,531
October 6	3:30 p.m.	at Air Force*	Falcon Stadium; Colorado Springs, CO (Commander-in-Chief's Trophy)	CBSSN	L 7–35	40,175
October 13	3:30 p.m.	Temple	Navy–Marine Corps Memorial Stadium; Annapolis, MD	CBSSN	L 17–24	30,106
October 20	3:30 p.m.	Houston	Navy–Marine Corps Memorial Stadium; Annapolis, MD	CBSSN	L 36–49	33,924
October 27	8:00 p.m.	vs. No. 3 Notre Dame*	SDCCU Stadium; San Diego, CA (rivalry)	CBS	L 22–44	63,626
November 3	3:30 p.m.	at Cincinnati	Nippert Stadium; Cincinnati, OH	ESPNU	L 0–42	36,318
November 10	12:00 p.m.	at No. 11 UCF	Spectrum Stadium; Orlando, FL	ESPN2	L 24–35	44,738
November 17	3:30 p.m.	Tulsa	Navy–Marine Corps Memorial Stadium; Annapolis, MD	CBSSN	W 37–29	31,517
November 24	12:00 p.m.	at Tulane	Yulman Stadium; New Orleans, LA	ESPNU	L 28–29	20,042
December 8	3:00 p.m.	vs. No. 22 Army*	Lincoln Financial Field; Philadelphia, PA (Army–Navy Game, College GameDay)	CBS	L 10–17	66,729
*Non-conference game; Rankings from AP Poll released prior to the game; All times are in Eastern time

== Personnel ==
=== Coaching staff ===
Name	Position	Seasons at Navy	Alma mater
Ken Niumatalolo	Head coach	21 (11 as HC)	Hawaii (1989)
Ivin Jasper	Offensive coordinator / quarterbacks coach	19	Hawaii (1994)
Dale Pehrson	Defensive coordinator / defensive line coach	23	Utah (1976)
Joe DuPaix	Slotbacks coach	4	Southern Utah (1998)
Justin Davis	Outside Linebackers coach	12	Maine (2001)
Lt. Col. Robert Green, USMC	Outside Linebackers coach	6	Navy (1998)
Ashley Ingram	Running Game Coordinator / offensive line coach	11	North Alabama (1996)
Steve Johns	Inside Linebackers	11	Occidental College (1991)
Dan O'Brien	Safeties coach	5	Boston College (2005)
Mike Judge	Fullbacks coach	11	Springfield College (2005)
Sione Po'uha	Defensive tackles coach	1	Utah (2016)
Danny O'Rourke	Special Teams Coordinator / offensive line coach	17	West Georgia (2000)
Napoleon Sykes	Outside Linebackers coach	5	Wake Forest (2006)
Mick Yokitis	Wide Receivers coach	8	Hawaii (2006)
Tony Grantham	Defensive Ends coach	11	Radford (2000)

=== Depth chart ===
Defense

FS
Sean Williams
Kerrick Jones
Mike Cabrera

WLB	ILB	ILB	SLB
Hudson Sullivan	Nizaire Cromartie	Taylor Heflin	Elan Nash
Pepe Tanuvasa	Carter Bankston	Diego Fagot	⋅
Tyler Pistorio	Tory Delmonico	Paul Carothers	Forrest Forte

SS
Jacob Springer
Juan Hailey
Brady Petersen

CB
Khaylan Williams
Micah Farrer
Elijah Jones

DE	NT	DE
Jarvis Polu	Jackson Pittman	Josh Webb
Marcus Edwards	Alema Kapoi	Anthony Villaobos
Corbin Heyward	Dave Tolentino	Denzel Polk

CB
⋅
⋅
⋅

Offense

WR
Ryan Mitchell
Zack Abey*
O.J. Davis

SB
Keoni-Kordell Makekau
C.J. Williams
Mason Plante

LT	LG	C	RG	RT
Jake Hawk	David Forney	Ford Higgins	Chris Gesell	Andrew Wood
Kendel Wright	Laurent Njiki	Bryan Barrett	Steve Satchell	Adam Amosa-Tagovailoa
Alec Keener	Lance Angulo	Sean Rattay	Billy Honaker	Peter Nestrowitz

SB
Tre Walker
Alekesi Yaramus*
Kody Crider

WR
Taylor Jackson
Alekesi Yaramus
Kody Crider*

QB
Malcolm Perry
Garrett Lewis
Dalen Morris

Key reserves
Zach Abey (QB)

FB
Anthony Gargiulo
Mike Martin
Nelson Smith

Special teams
PK Bennett Moehring & J.R. Osborn
P Owen White & J.R. Osborn
KR Tre Walker & Keoni-Kordell Makekau
PR Jarid Ryan & Jake Springer
LS Michael Pifer & Kyle Gibbs
H Garrett Lewis

Depth Chart 2018
True Freshman
Double Position : *

== Game summaries ==
=== At Hawaii ===
Navy Midshipmen at Hawaii Rainbow Warriors

Quarter	1	2	3	4	Total
Midshipmen	0	14	14	13	41
Rainbow Warriors	14	24	0	21	59

at Aloha Stadium, Honolulu, HI

- Date: September 1, 2018
- Game time: 11:00 p.m. EDT
- Game weather: Temp: 82 F • Wind: NNE 13 MPH • Weather: Fair, humid
- Game attendance: 29,703
- Referee: Steve Baron
- TV announcers (CBSSN): John Sadak, Randy Cross, and Amanda Balionis (sideline)

Game information

First Quarter

HAW – QB Cole Macdonald 7 yard TD pass to WR Cedric Byrd. K Ryan Meskell point-after TD kick (12 plays, 75 yards).

HAW – RB F. Holly III 1 yard TD run. Ryan Meskell PAT kick (10 plays, 71 yards).

Second Quarter

HAW – Cole MacDonald 34 yard TD pass to WR JoJo Ward. Ryan Meskell PAT kick, (4 plays, 40 yards).

HAW – PR M. Hendrie 19 yard TD punt return, Ryan Meskell PAT kick.

NAVY – WR/QB Zach Abey 3 yard TD run, K Bennett Moehring PAT kick, (8 plays, 75 yards).

HAW – Cole MacDonald 50 yard pass to John Ursua 50 yard pass, Ryan Meskell PAT kick. (6 plays, 75 yards).

NAVY – QB Malcolm Perry 75 yard TD run, Bennett Moehring PAT kick, (1 play, 75 yards).

HAW – Ryan Meskell 23 yard field goal, (12 plays, 71 yards).

Third Quarter

NAVY – Zach Abey 1 TD yard run, Bennett Moehring PAT kick, (12 plays, 75 yards).

NAVY – Zach Abey 7 TD yard run, Bennett Moehring PAT kick, (3 plays, 9 yards).

Fourth Quarter

HAW – Cole MacDonald 31 yard TD pass to Cedric Byrd, Ryan Meskell PAT kick, (7 plays, 71 yards)

NAVY – Malcolm Perry 19 yard TD pass to SB Tre Walker, Bennett Moehring PAT kick, (6 plays, 75 yards).

HAW – Cole MacDonald 75 yard pass to JoJo Ward, Ryan Meskell PAT kick, (2 plays, 78 yards).

HAW – Cole MacDonald 9 yard TD pass to WR John Ursua, Ryan Meskell PAT kick, (9 plays, 60 yards).

NAVY – Zach Abey 2 yard TD run, QB Garret Lewis 2-point conversion rush failed, (11 plays, 75 yards).

Passing

- NAVY – 85 yards
- HAW – 436 yards

Rushing

- NAVY – 236 yards
- HAW – 86 yards

Receiving

- NAVY – 6/13 (completed/attempted)
- HAW – 31/42 (completed/attempted)

=== Memphis ===
Memphis Tigers at Navy Midshipmen

Quarter	1	2	3	4	Total
Tigers	0	7	14	0	21
Midshipmen	3	6	0	13	22

at Navy–Marine Corps Memorial Stadium, Annapolis, MD

- Date: September 8, 2018
- Game time: 3:30 p.m. EDT
- Game weather: Temp: 72 F • Wind: E 15-20 MPH • Weather: overcast, rain
- Game attendance: 31,762
- Referee: Todd LaPenta
- TV announcers (CBSSN): John Sadak, Randy Cross, and Amanda Balionis (sideline)

Game information

First Quarter

NAVY – Kicker Bennett Moehring 23 yard field goal (12 plays, 32 yards).

Second Quarter

MEM – RB Darrell Henderson 2 yard TD run. Kicker Riley Patterson point-after TD kick (12 plays, 86 yards).

NAVY – QB Malcolm Perry 7 yard TD run. QB Gerret Lewis failed 2-point conversion (11 plays, 75 yards).

Third Quarter

MEM – Darrell Henderson 78 yard TD run. Riley Patterson PAT kick (2 plays, 78 yards).

MEM – Darrell Henderson 59 TD run. Riley Patterson PAT kick (1 play, 54 yards).

Fourth Quarter

NAVY – Malcolm Perry 19 yard TD run. Bennett Moehring PAT kick (2 plays, 27 yards).

NAVY – WR/QB Zach Abey 3 yard TD run. Zach Abey 2-point conversion failed (13 plays, 56 yards).

Passing

- MEM – 145 yards
- NAVY – 52 yards

Rushing

- MEM – 233 yards
- NAVY – 264 yards

Receiving

- MEM – 15/25 (completed/attempted) 1 INT
- NAVY – 4/6 (completed/attempted)

=== Lehigh ===
Lehigh Mountain Hawks at Navy Midshipmen

Quarter	1	2	3	4	Total
Mountain Hawks	7	0	0	14	21
Midshipmen	21	13	14	3	51

at Navy–Marine Corps Memorial Stadium, Annapolis, MD

- Date: September 15, 2018
- Game time: 3:30 p.m. EDT
- Game weather: Temp: 82 F • Wind: NE 9 MPH • Weather: Overcast
- Game attendance: 30,011
- Referee: Hank Johns
- TV announcers (CBSSN): John Sadak, Randy Cross, and Sheehan Stanwick-Burch (sideline)

Game information

First Quarter

NAVY – QB Malcolm Perry 5 yard TD run. Kicker Bennett Moehring point-after TD kick. (7 plays, 67 yards)

LEH – RB Rashawn Allen 75 yard TD run. Kicker Ed Mish PAT kick. (1 play, 75 yards)

Second Quarter

NAVY – Malcolm Perry 24 yard TD run. Bennett Moehring PAT kick. (2 plays, 28 yards)

NAVY – WR/QB Zach Abey 1 yard TD run. Bennett Moehring PAT kick. (4 plays, 73 yards)

NAVY – SB Myles Felles 52 yards TD run. Bennett Moehring PAT kick. (7 plays, 83 yards)

NAVY – Bennett Moehring 29 yard field goal. (8 plays, 32 yards)

NAVY – Bennett Moehring 37 yard field goal kick. (3 plays, 24 yards)

Third Quarter

NAVY – Malcolm Perry 30 yard TD run. Bennett Moehring PAT kick. (10 plays, 85 yards)

NAVY – QB Garrett Lewis 4 yard TD run. Bennett Moehring PAT kick. (4 plays, 52 yards)

Fourth Quarter

LEH – Allen Rashawn 26 yard TD run. Ed Mish PAT kick. (10 plays, 75 yards)

NAVY – Bennett Moehring 45 yard field goal kick. (9 plays, 50 yards)

LEH – QB Tyler Monaco 2 yard TD pass to WR Cam Richardson. Ed Mish PAT kick. (9 plays, 32 yards)

Passing

- LEH – 174 yards
- NAVY – 145 yards

Rushing

- LEH – 162 yards
- NAVY – 484 yards

Receiving

- LEH – 22/40 (completed/attempted) 3 INT
- NAVY – 6/14 (completed/attempted) 1 INT

=== At SMU ===
Battle for the Gansz Trophy: Navy Midshipmen at SMU Mustangs

Quarter	1	2	3	4	OT	Total
Midshipmen	0	7	7	9	7	30
Mustangs	3	7	7	6	8	31

at Gerald J. Ford Stadium, Dallas, TX

- Date: September 22, 2018
- Game time: 12:00
- Game weather: Temperature: 75 F • Wind: E5 MPH • Weather: light rain
- Game attendance: 17,531
- Referee: Adam Savoie
- TV announcers (ESPNews): Bill Roth and Mike Golic Jr.

Game information

First Quarter

SMU – Kicker Kevin Robledo 26 yard field goal. (14 plays, 72 yards)

Second Quarter

NAVY – QB/WR Zach Abey 1 yard TD run. Kicker Bennett Moehring point-after TD kick. (18 plays, 78 yards)

SMU – QB William Brown 20 yard TD pass to RB Roberson Jr. Kevin Robledo PAT kick. (6 plays, 36 yards)

Third Quarter

NAVY – QB Garrett Lewis 25 yard TD pass to WR Mychal Cooper. Bennett Moehring PAT kick. (7 plays, 62 yards)

SMU – PR Roberson Jr. 98 yard TD kickoff return. Kevin Robledo PAT kick.

Fourth Quarter

SMU – QB William Brown 2 yard TD pass to WR M. Gailliard. Kevin Robledo blocked kick. (4 plays, 2 yards)

NAVY – CB Jarid Ryan 98 yard TD PAT return.

NAVY – SB C.J. Williams 52 yard. Bennett Moehring PAT kick. (5 plays, 81 yards)

Overtime

NAVY – QB Garrett Lewis 1 yard TD run. Bennett Moehring PAT kick. (9 plays, 25 yards)

SMU – QB Ben Hicks 4 yard TD pass to WR James Proche. Ben Hicks 2-point conversion pass to WR Hunter Thedford 2-point. (7 plays, 25 yards)

Passing

- NAVY – 25 yards
- SMU – 166 yards

Rushing

- NAVY – 349 yards
- SMU – 158 yards

Receiving

- NAVY – 1/4 (completed/attempted)
- SMU – 24/32 (completed/attempted)

=== At Air Force ===
Battle for the Commander-in-Chief's Trophy: Navy Midshipmen at Air Force Falcons

Quarter	1	2	3	4	Total
Midshipmen	0	7	0	0	7
Falcons	0	14	14	7	35

at Falcon Stadium, Colorado Springs, CO

- Date: October 6, 2018
- Game time: 3:30 p.m. EDT
- Game weather: Temperature: 42 F • Wind: 12 MPH • Weather: cloudy
- Game attendance: 40,175
- Referee: Mike Roche
- TV announcers (CBSSN): Carter Blackburn, Aaron Taylor, and Sheehan Stanwick-Burch (sideline)

Game information

First Quarter

NAVY – QB Garrett Lewis 2 yard TD run to. Kicker Bennett Moehring PAT kick. (9 plays, 34 yards).

Second Quarter

AF – QB Donald Hammond III 61 yard TD pass to WR Ronald Cleveland. Kicker Jake Koehke PAT kick. (3 plays, 65 yards).

AF – Joseph Saucier 48 yard TD run. Jake Koehke PAT kick. (2 plays, 63 yards).

Third Quarter

AF – Donald Hammond III 5 yard TD run. Jake Koehke PAT kick. (7 plays, 75 yards).

AF – Donald Hammond III 1 yard TD run. Jake Koehke PAT kick. (14 plays, 75 yards).

Fourth Quarter

AF – Donald Hammond III 2 yard TD run. Jake Koehke PAT kick. (8 plays, 44 yards).

Passing

- NAVY – 49 yards. Malcolm Perry – 2/6, 36 yards
- AF – 142 yards. Donald Hammond III – 6/10, 142 yards, 1 TD

Rushing

- NAVY – 129 yards. Malcolm Perry – 19 carries, 54 yards
- AF – 257 yards. Joseph Saucier – 3 carries, 62 yards, 1 TD

Receiving

- NAVY – 3/12 (completed/attempted). Mychal Cooper – 1 reception, 27 yards
- AF – 6/10 (completed/attempted). Ronald Cleveland – 2 receptions, 72 yards, 1 TD

=== Temple ===
Temple Owls at Navy Midshipmen

Quarter	1	2	3	4	Total
Owls	0	7	10	7	24
Midshipmen	0	10	7	0	17

at Navy–Marine Corps Memorial Stadium, Annapolis, MD

- Date: October 13, 2018
- Game time: 3:30 p.m. EDT
- Game weather: Temperature: 58 F • Wind: N 10-15 MPH • Weather: partly cloudy
- Game attendance: 30,106
- Referee: Anthony Calabrese
- TV announcers (CBSSN): John Sadak, Randy Cross, and Sheehan Stanwick-Burch (sideline)

Game information

First Quarter

No scoring drives.

Second Quarter

NAVY – Kicker Bennett Moehring 24 yard field goal. (17 plays, 71 yards).

TEM – RB Tyliek Raynor 15 yard TD run. Kicker Will Mobley point-after kick. (9 plays, 77 yards).

NAVY – QB Garrett Lewis 1 yard TD run. Bennett Moehring PAT kick. (11 plays, 75 yards).

Third Quarter

NAVY – FB Nelson Smith 12 yard TD run. Bennett Moehring PAT kick. (4 plays, 75 yards).

TEM – Will Mobley 31 yard field goal. (6 plays, 31 yards).

TEM – RB Rob Ritrovato 1 yard TD run. Will Mobley PAT kick. (8 plays, 65 yards).

Fourth Quarter

TEM – QB Anthony Russo 62 yard TD pass to WR Ventell Bryant. Will Mobley PAT kick. (1 play, 62 yards).

Passing

- TEM – 21 yards
- NAVY – 18 yards

Rushing

- TEM – 109 yards
- NAVY – 270 yards

Receiving

- TEM – 23/32 (completed/attempted) 1 INT
- NAVY – 3/11 (completed/attempted)

=== Houston ===
Houston Cougars at Navy Midshipmen

Quarter	1	2	3	4	Total
Cougars	7	14	14	14	49
Midshipmen	10	14	0	12	36

at Navy–Marine Corps Memorial Stadium, Annapolis, MD

- Date: October 20, 2018
- Game weather: Temperature: 64 F • Wind: W 7 MPH • Weather: mostly sunny, clear
- Game attendance: 33,924
- Referee: C. Lamertina
- TV announcers (CBSSN): John Sadak, Randy Cross, and Sheehan Stanwick-Burch (sideline)

Game information

First Quarter

NAVY – Kicker Bennett Moehring 43 yard field goal. (9 plays, 22 yards).

HOU – RB Patrick Carr 22 yard TD run. Kicker David Witherspoon point-after kick. (8 plays, 75 yards).

NAVY – SB Malcolm Perry 32 yard TD run. Bennett Moehring PAT kick. (9 plays, 75 yards).

Second Quarter

NAVY – QB/WR Zach Abey 1 yard TD run. Bennett Moehring PAT kick. (12 plays, 76 yards).

HOU – QB D'Eriq King 17 yard TD run. David Witherspoon PAT kick. (8 plays, 75 yards).

NAVY – SB Tazh Malloy 32 yard TD run. Bennett Moehring PAT kick. (2 plays, 75 yards).

HOU – QB D'Eriq Malloy 65 yard TD pass to WR Courtney Lark. David Witherspoon PAT kick. (2 plays, 75 yards).

Third Quarter

HOU – QB D'Eriq Malloy 14 yard TD pass to WR Romello Booker. David Witherspoon PAT kick. (10 plays, 88 yards).

HOU – RB Marquez Stevenson 1 yard TD run. David Witherspoon PAT kick. (5 plays, 71 yards).

Fourth Quarter

HOU – QB D'Eriq Malloy 2 yard TD pass to WR Keith Corbin. David Witherspoon PAT kick. (9 plays, 54 yards).

HOU – LB Nick Watkins 50 yard INT. (David Witherspoon PAT kick.)

NAVY – SB Myles Fells 14 yard TD run. Bennett Moehring PAT kick. (15 plays, 75 yards).

NAVY – WR Taylor Jackson 14 yard TD run. Bennett Moehring PAT kick. (3 plays, 65 yards).

Passing

- HOU – 413 yards
- NAVY – 178 yards

Rushing

- HOU – 157 yards
- NAVY – 344 yards

Receiving

- HOU – 25/39 (completed/attempted) 1 INT
- NAVY – 10/16 (completed/attempted) 1 INT

=== Vs. Notre Dame ===
Battle for the Rip Miller Trophy: Navy Midshipmen vs. Notre Dame Fighting Irish

Quarter	1	2	3	4	Total
No. 3 Fighting Irish	13	14	10	7	44
Midshipmen	0	0	14	8	22

at SDCCU Stadium, San Diego, CA

- Date: October 27, 2018
- Game time: 8:00 p.m.
- Game weather: Temperature: 71 F • Wind: W 3 MPH • Weather: clear
- Game attendance: 63,626
- Referee: Jeff Heaser
- TV announcers (CBS): Carter Blackburn, Rick Neuheisel, Aaron Taylor, and John Schriffen (sideline)

Game information

First Quarter

ND – RB Jafar Armstrong 1 yard TD run. Kicker Jonathan Doerer PAT kick failed. (8 plays, 73 yards).

ND – RB Dexter Williams 12 yard TD run. Jonathan Doerer PAT kick. (4 plays, 80 yards).

Second Quarter

ND – Dexter Williams 9 yard TD run. Jonathan Doerer PAT kick. (13 plays, 67 yards).

ND – Dexter Williams 2 yard TD run. Jonathan Doerer PAT kick. (10 plays, 83 yards).

Third Quarter

NAVY – QB/WR Zach Abey 1 yard TD run. Kicker Bennett Moehring PAT kick. (4 plays, 75 yards).

ND – Jonathan Doerer 30 yard field goal. (11 plays, 61 yards)

NAVY – Zach Abey 1 yard TD run. Bennett Moehring PAT kick. (7 plays, 75 yards).

ND – QB Ian Book 4 yard TD pass to WR Miles Boykin. Jonathan Doerer PAT kick. (9 plays, 75 yards).

Fourth Quarter

NAVY – SB Mike Martin 33 yard TD run. Bennett Moehring PAT kick. (O.J. Davis pass). (2 plays, 39 yards).

ND – Ian Book 22 yard TD pass to Miles Boykin. Jonathan Doerer PAT kick. (8 plays, 75 yards).

Passing

- NAVY – 52 yards
- ND – 330 yards

Rushing

- NAVY – 292 yards
- ND – 254 yards

Receiving

- NAVY – 4/12 (completed/attempted) 1 INT
- ND – 27/33 (completed/attempted) 1 INT

=== At Cincinnati ===
Navy Midshipmen at Cincinnati Bearcats

Quarter	1	2	3	4	Total
Midshipmen	0	0	0	0	0
Bearcats	7	21	7	7	42

at Nippert Stadium, Cincinnati, OH

- Date: November 3, 2018
- Game time: 3:30 p.m. EDT
- Game weather: Temperature 55 F • Wind SSW MPH • Weather: Sunny, intermittent clouds
- Game attendance: 36,318
- Referee: Jeff Maconaghy
- TV announcers (ESPNU): Roy Philpott and Tom Ramsey

Game information

First Quarter

CIN – RB Michael Warren 8 yard TD run. Kicker Cole Smith PAT kick. (6 plays, 60 yards).

Second Quarter

CIN – QB Desmond Ridder 7 yards TD run. Cole Smith PAT kick. (14 plays, 89 yards).

CIN – Michael Warren 1 yard TD run. Cole Smith PAT kick. (12 plays, 75 yards).

CIN – QB Haden Moore 11 yard TD pass to WR Josiah Deguara. Cole Smith PAT kick. (5 plays, 47 yards).

Third Quarter

CIN – Desmond Ridder 55 yard TD pass to WR Rashad Medaris. Cole Smith PAT kick. (6 plays, 76 yards).

Fourth Quarter

CIN – RB Charles McClelland 40 yard TD run. Cole Smith PAT kick. (1 play, 40 yards).

Passing

- NAVY – 47 yards
- CIN – 189 yards

Rushing

- NAVY – 124 yards
- CIN – 262 yards

Receiving

- NAVY – 3/4 (completed/attempted)
- CIN – 14/20 (completed/attempted)

=== At UCF ===
Navy Midshipmen at UCF Knights

Quarter	1	2	3	4	Total
Midshipmen	0	3	7	14	24
No. 11 Knights	14	7	7	7	35

at Spectrum Stadium, Orlando, FL

- Date: November 10, 2018
- Game time: 12 p.m.
- Game weather: Temperature: 79 F • Wind: N 7 MPH • Weather: Sunny
- Game attendance: 44,738
- Referee: Tracey Jones
- TV announcers (ESPN2): Anish Shroff, Ahmad Brooks, and Roddy Jones (sideline)

Game information

First Quarter

UCF – RB Greg McCrae 11 yard TD run. Kicker Matthew Wright PAT kick. (11 plays, 86 yards).

UCF – Taj McGowan 2 yard TD run. Matthew Wright PAT kick. (11 plays, 62 yards).

Second Quarter

UCF – QB McKenzie Milton 34 yard TD pass to WR D. Snelson. Matthew Wright PAT kick. (6 plays, 66 yards).

NAVY – Kicker Bennett Moehring 24-yard field goal. (10 plays, 58 yards).

Third Quarter

NAVY – QB/WR Zach Abey 5 yard TD run. Bennett Moehring PAT kick. (11 plays, 75 yards).

UCF – McKenzie Milton 1 yard TD run. Matthew Wright PAT kick. (12 plays, 75 yards).

Fourth Quarter

NAVY – SB Mike Martin 14 yard TD run. Bennett Moehring PAT kick. (10 plays, 75 yards).

UCF – McKenzie Milton 12 yard TD pass to D. Snelson. Matthew Wright PAT kick. (10 plays, 85 yards).

NAVY – Zach Abey 8 yard TD run. Bennett Moehring PAT kick. (8 plays, 51 yards).

Passing

- NAVY – 0 yards
- UCF – 200 yards

Rushing

- NAVY – 374 yards
- UCF – 297 yards

Receiving

- NAVY – 0/2 (completed/attempted)
- UCF – 17/21 (completed/attempted)

=== Tulsa ===
Tulsa Golden Hurricane at Navy Midshipmen

Quarter	1	2	3	4	Total
Golden Hurricane	7	9	0	13	29
Midshipmen	7	20	3	7	37

at Navy–Marine Corps Memorial Stadium, Annapolis, MD

- Date: November 17, 2018
- Game weather: Temperature: 51 F • Weather: clear, sunny • Wind: N 10–15 MPH
- Game attendance: 31,517
- Referee: Anthony Calabrese
- TV announcers (CBSSN): John Sadak, Randy Cross, and Amanda Balionis (sideline)

Game information

First Quarter

TLSA – RB Corey Taylor II 1 yard TD run. Kicker John Parker Romo PAT kick. (14 plays, 51 yards).

NAVY – SB Nelson Smith 10 yard TD run. Kicker Bennett Moehring PAT kick. (11 plays, 69 yards).

Second Quarter

NAVY – Nelson Smith 26 yard TD run. Bennett Moehring PAT kick. (5 plays, 60 yards).

TLSA – Reggie Robinson 98 yard PAT run. (2 point score)

NAVY – QB Zach Abey 2 yard TD run. Bennett Moehring PAT kick. (6 plays, 31 yards)

TLSA – RB Keylon Stokes 19 yard TD run. John Parker Romo PAT kick. (5 plays, 61 yards).

NAVY – Zach Abey 2 yard TD run. Bennett Moehring PAT kick. (12 plays, 70 yards).

Third Quarter

NAVY – Bennett Moehring 21 yard field goal. (8 plays, 93 yards).

Fourth Quarter

TLSA – Corey Taylor II 3 yard TD run. John Parker Romo PAT kick blocked. (10 plays, 76 yards).

NAVY – SB Tre Walker 33 yard TD run. Bennett Moehring PAT kick. (9 plays, 74 yards).

TLSA – Corey Taylor II 1 yard TD run. J. Romo PAT kick. (7 plays, 45 yards).

Passing

- TLSA – 206 yards
- NAVY – 15 yards

Rushing

- TLSA – 164 yards
- NAVY – 389 yards

Receiving

- TLSA – 19/28 (completed/attempted) 1 INT
- NAVY – 1/2 (completed/attempted)

=== At Tulane ===
Navy Midshipmen at Tulane Green Wave

Quarter	1	2	3	4	Total
Midshipmen	0	3	18	7	28
Green Wave	0	21	0	8	29

at Yulman Stadium, New Orleans, LA

- Date: November 24, 2018
- Game time: 12:00 p.m.
- Game weather: Temperature: 63 F • Wind: 5 MPH • Weather: cloudy
- Game attendance: 20,042
- Referee: Charles Lamerti
- TV announcers (ESPNU): Mike Corey and Rene Ingoglia

Game information

First Quarter

No scoring drives

Second Quarter

- TULN – QB Justin McMillan 55 yard TD pass to WR Darnell Mooney. Kicker M. Glover PAT kick. (3 plays, 80 yards).
- NAVY – Kicker Bennett Moehring 48 yard field goal. (13 plays, 44 yards).
- TULN – Justin McMillan 5 yard TD run. M. Glover PAT kick. (7 plays, 77 yards).
- TULN – Justin McMillan 52 yard TD pass to WR J. Clewis. M. Glover PAT kick. (4 plays, 75 yards).

Third Quarter

- NAVY – Bennett Moehring 19 yard field goal. (4 plays, 4 yards).
- NAVY – SB Malcolm Perry 37 yard TD pass to QB Zach Abey (trick play). Bennett Moehring PAT kick. (4 plays, 61 yards).
- NAVY – Zach Abey 73 yard TD pass to Malcolm Perry. Bennett Moehring PAT kick. (1 play, 73 yards).

Fourth Quarter

- NAVY – SB Tazh Malloy 9 yard TD run. Bennett Moehring PAT kick. (14 plays, 80 yards).
- TULN – Justin McMillan 26 yard TD pass to WR J. Toles. WR Charles Jones pass 2-point conversion. (7 plays, 71 yards).

Passing

- NAVY – 204 yards
- TULN – 291 yards

Rushing

- NAVY – 117 yards
- TULN – 129 yards

Receiving

- NAVY – 8/16 (completed/attempted)
- TULN – 18/29 (completed/attempted) 1 INT

=== Vs. Army ===
Battle for the Commander-in-Chief's Trophy: No. 22 Army Black Knights vs. Navy Midshipmen

Quarter	1	2	3	4	Total
No. 22 Black Knights	7	0	3	7	17
Midshipmen	0	0	0	10	10

at Lincoln Financial Field, Philadelphia, PA

- Date: December 8, 2018
- Game time: 3:00 p.m.
- Game weather: Temperature: 38 F • Wind: 5 MPH • Weather: clear
- Game attendance: 66,729
- Referee: J. Magallanes
- TV announcers (CBS): Brad Nessler (play-by-play), Gary Danielson (color), & Jamie Erdahl (sideline)

Game information

First Quarter

ARMY – QB Kelvin Hopkins Jr. 10 yard TD run. Kicker John Abercrombie PAT kick. (5 plays, 82 yards).

Second Quarter

No scoring drives

Third Quarter

ARMY – John Abercrombie 33 yard field goal. (14 plays, 64 yards).

Fourth Quarter

NAVY – QB Garrett Lewis 1 yard TD run. Kicker Bennett Moehring PAT kick. (4 plays, 48 yards).

ARMY – Kelvin Hopkins Jr. 1 yard TD run. John Abercrombie PAT kick. (4 plays, 22 yards).

NAVY – Bennett Moehring 46 yard field goal. (10 plays, 47 yards).

Passing

- ARMY – 61 yards
- NAVY – 81 yards

Rushing

- ARMY – 222 yards
- NAVY – 127 yards

Receiving

- ARMY – 4/9 (completed/attempted)
- NAVY – 5/17 (completed/attempted) 2 INT
