= 2018 Cure Bowl =

American college football game

2018 AutoNation Cure Bowl
- 4th Cure Bowl
Tulane Green Wave	Louisiana Ragin' Cajuns
(6–6)	(7–6)
The American	Sun Belt
41	24
Head coach: Willie Fritz	Head coach: Billy Napier
	1	2	3	4	Total
Tulane	21	3	3	14	41
Louisiana	7	3	7	7	24
- Date: December 15, 2018
- Season: 2018
- Stadium: Camping World Stadium
- Location: Orlando, Florida
- MVP: Darius Bradwell (RB, Tulane)
- Favorite: Tulane by 3.5
- National anthem: Girl Scouts Citrus Singers
- Referee: Jonathan Noli (Conference USA)
- Attendance: 19,066
- Payout: US$751,000

United States TV coverage
- Network: CBSSN and Touchdown Radio
- Announcers: Carter Blackburn, Aaron Taylor and John Schriffen (CBSSN); JP Shadrick, Gino Torretta and Jamie Seh (Touchdown Radio)

The 2018 Cure Bowl was a college football bowl game played on December 15, 2018, with kickoff scheduled for 1:30 p.m. EST. It was the fourth edition of the Cure Bowl, and one of the 2018–19 bowl games concluding the 2018 FBS football season. Sponsored by automotive retailer AutoNation, the game was officially known as the AutoNation Cure Bowl.

== Teams ==
The game was played between the Tulane Green Wave from the American Athletic Conference (AAC) and the Louisiana Ragin’ Cajuns from the Sun Belt Conference. Both teams made their first appearance in a Cure Bowl. This game was the 27th all time meeting against the Ragin' Cajuns and the Green Wave, with Tulane leading the series 22–4; this was their second meeting in a bowl.

=== Louisiana ===
Louisiana won the Sun Belt West Division title, earning a berth in the inaugural Sun Belt Championship, where they lost to Appalachian State. The Ragin' Cajuns entered the bowl with a 7–6 record (5–3 in conference).

=== Tulane ===
Tulane received and accepted a bid to the Cure Bowl on December 2. The Green Wave, who were co-champions of the West Division of the AAC, entered the bowl with a 6–6 record (5–3 in conference).

== Game summary ==
=== Scoring summary ===
Scoring summary

Quarter	Time	Drive			Team	Scoring information	Score	
Quarter	Time	Plays	Yards	TOP	Team	Scoring information	TUL	LA
1	12:25	6	75	2:35	LA	Raymond Calais 38-yard touchdown run, Kyle Pfau kick good	0	7
1	9:49	7	75	2:36	TUL	Darius Bradwell 15-yard touchdown run, Merek Glover kick good	7	7
1	5:21	6	55	2:59	TUL	Terren Encalade 38-yard touchdown reception from Justin McMillan, Merek Glover kick good	14	7
1	0:48	8	63	2:36	TUL	Amare Jones 1-yard touchdown run, Merek Glover kick good	21	7
2	10:14	9	35	4:32	TUL	38-yard field goal by Merek Glover	24	7
2	0:00	4	11	0:23	LA	43-yard field goal by Kyle Pfau	24	10
3	9:46	6	62	1:50	LA	Elijah Mitchell 3-yard touchdown run, Kyle Pfau kick good	24	17
3	2:58	12	73	4:51	TUL	26-yard field goal by Merek Glover	27	17
4	10:16	4	56	1:04	LA	Jarrod Jackson 13-yard touchdown reception from Andre Nunez, Kyle Pfau kick good	27	24
4	3:49	13	75	6:27	TUL	Darius Bradwell 4-yard touchdown run, Merek Glover kick good	34	24
4	3:06	4	19	0:22	TUL	Justin McMillan 16-yard touchdown run, Merek Glover kick good	41	24
"TOP" = time of possession. For other American football terms, see Glossary of American football.							41	24

=== Statistics ===
	1	2	3	4	Total
Green Wave	21	3	3	14	41
Ragin' Cajuns	7	3	7	7	24

Statistics	TUL	LA
First downs	28	11
Plays–yards	86–482	55–258
Rushes–yards	68–337	30–84
Passing yards	145	174
Passing: Comp–Att–Int	11–18–1	11–25–1
Time of possession	40:31	19:29

Team	Category	Player	Statistics
Tulane	Passing	Justin McMillan	11/18, 145 yds, 1 TD, 1 INT
Tulane	Rushing	Darius Bradwell	35 car, 150 yds, 2 TD
Tulane	Receiving	Terren Encalade	5 rec, 93 yds, 1 TD
Louisiana	Passing	Andre Nunez	8/17, 136 yds
Louisiana	Rushing	Raymond Calais	3 car, 41 yds, 1 TD
Louisiana	Receiving	Ryheem Malone	3 rec, 59 yds
