= Charles Jones (tight end) =

American football player (born 1996)

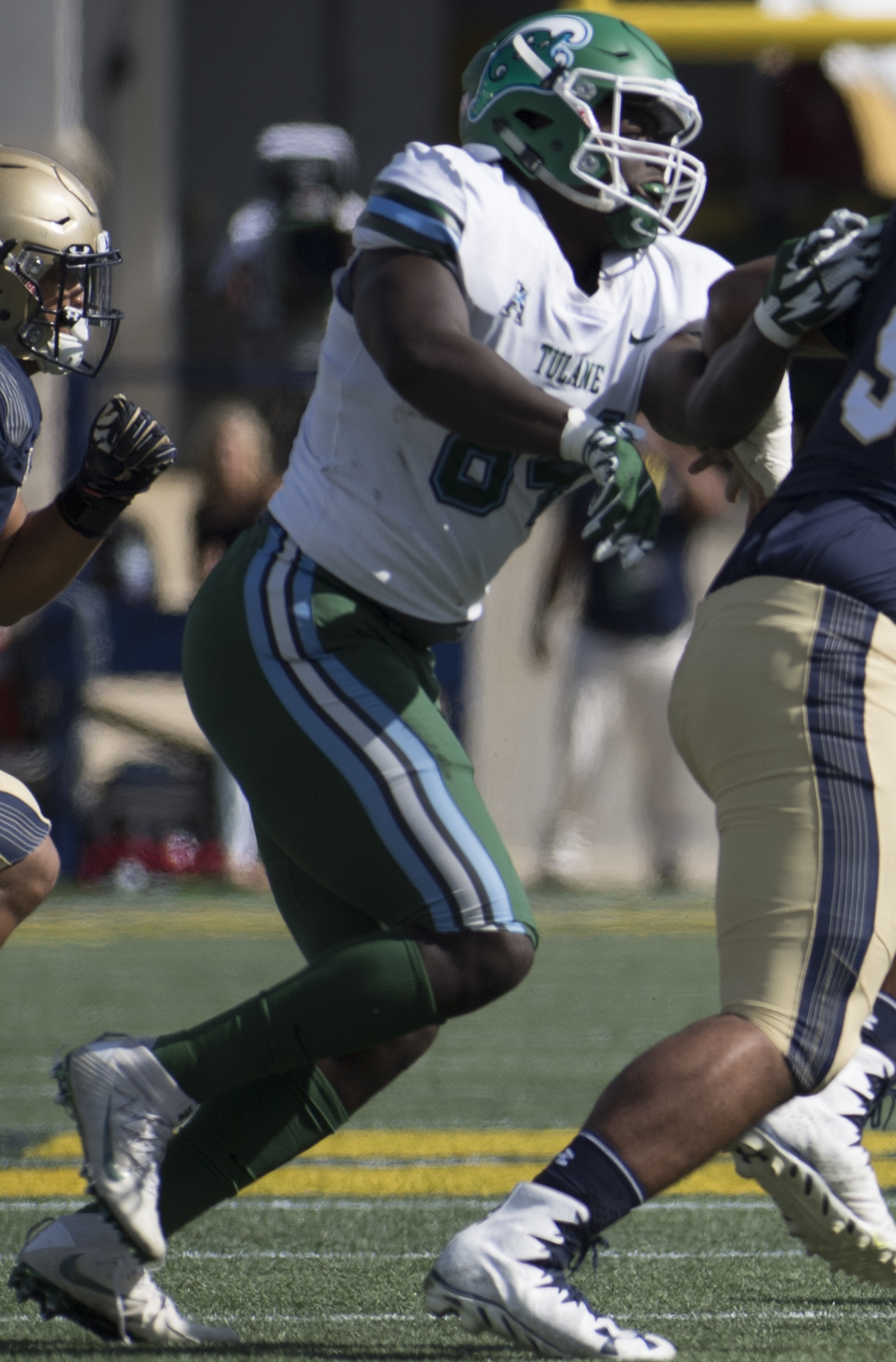
- Jones with Tulane in 2017

No. 84
- Position: Tight end

Personal information
- Born: August 5, 1996 (age 30); New Orleans, Louisiana, U.S.
- Listed height: 6 ft 4 in (1.93 m)
- Listed weight: 255 lb (116 kg)

Career information
- High school: St. Augustine (New Orleans)
- College: Tulane (2014–2018)
- NFL draft: 2019: undrafted

Career history
- Jacksonville Jaguars (2019); Buffalo Bills (2020)*; Pittsburgh Steelers (2020–2021)*; New Jersey Generals (2023)
- * Offseason or practice squad member only

Career NFL statistics
- Receptions: 1
- Receiving yards: 5
- Stats at Pro Football Reference

Charles Jones II (born August 5, 1996) is an American former professional football player who was a tight end in the National Football League (NFL). He played college football for the Tulane Green Wave.

== Early life ==
Jones attended St. Augustine High School in New Orleans. In high school, he was teammates with Leonard Fournette.

== College career ==
Jones played college football for the Tulane Green Wave. During his time for the Green Wave, he appeared in 40 games with 22 starts, and totaled 40 receptions for 268 yards and five touchdowns.

== Professional career ==
Pre-draft measurables
Height	Weight	Arm length	Hand span	40-yard dash	10-yard split	20-yard split	20-yard shuttle	Three-cone drill	Vertical jump	Broad jump	Bench press
6 ft 3 in (1.91 m)	254 lb (115 kg)	32 1/2 in (0.83 m)	9 3/4 in (0.25 m)	4.90 s	1.67 s	2.83 s	4.70 s	7.83 s	33.0 in (0.84 m)	9 ft 9 in (2.97 m)	24 reps
All values from Pro Day

=== Jacksonville Jaguars ===
After going undrafted in the 2019 NFL draft, Jones was signed by the Jacksonville Jaguars. He was waived on August 31, 2019, and was signed to the practice squad the next day. He was promoted to the active roster on November 18, 2019.

Jones was placed on the reserve/COVID-19 list by the Jaguars on July 30, 2020. He was activated from the list on the morning of August 2, 2020, but was re-added to the list later that day. He was activated from the list again on August 7. He was waived/injured on August 22, 2020, and subsequently reverted to the team's injured reserve list the next day. He was waived from injured reserve with an injury settlement on September 1, 2020.

=== Buffalo Bills ===
On October 28, 2020, Jones was signed to the Buffalo Bills practice squad, but was released three days later.

=== Pittsburgh Steelers ===
On November 17, 2020, the Pittsburgh Steelers signed Jones to their practice squad. He signed a reserve/future contract on January 21, 2021. He was waived on May 3.

=== New Jersey Generals ===
Jones signed with the New Jersey Generals of the USFL on January 11, 2023. He was placed on the injured reserve list before the start of the regular season on March 26. The Generals folded when the XFL and USFL merged to create the United Football League (UFL).
