= Patrick Carr (American football) =

American gridiron football player (born 1995)

Profile
- Position: Running back

Personal information
- Born: September 22, 1995 (age 31); The Woodlands, Texas, U.S.
- Listed height: 5 ft 10 in (1.78 m)
- Listed weight: 207 lb (94 kg)

Career information
- High school: The Woodlands
- College: Colorado (2015); Houston (2016–2019)
- NFL draft: 2020: undrafted

Career history
- Seattle Seahawks (2020)*; Ottawa Redblacks (2021)*; Seamen Milano (2024)
- * Offseason or practice squad member only
- Stats at Pro Football Reference

Patrick Carr (born September 22, 1995) is an American football running back. He last played for the Seamen Milano in the European League of Football before being released. Carr signed with the Seattle Seahawks as an undrafted free agent following the 2020 NFL draft. He has also been a member of the Ottawa Redblacks of the Canadian Football League (CFL). He played college football for the Colorado Buffaloes and the Houston Cougars.

== Early life ==
Carr played tailback for The Woodlands High School in The Woodlands, Texas. Wearing jersey #1, Carr was a four-year letterer and a three-year starter for the Highlanders football team. During his career, he rushed for 5,202 yards and 51 touchdowns, breaking the previous school record made by future NFL player Daniel Lasco. He received multiple honors, including All-County Sophomore MVP, second-team all-state, District Most Valuable Player, and first-team all-district at some point in his high school career. Carr was ranked the 93rd best player in the nation and was listed as a 4-star recruit by the end of his senior season. He committed to the University of Colorado over offers from Arkansas, Arizona State, Iowa, Kentucky, Oklahoma State, Oregon, Texas A&M, Texas Tech, TCU, and Wake Forest. Carr also played football alongside fellow NFL player Antoine Winfield Jr., who played safety for The Woodlands.

He was also a four-year letterer in track, where he received state honors in the 100-meter dash, the 4x100 relay race, the 4x200 relay race, and the field event long jump. Carr additionally lettered in soccer as a freshman but left the team before the end of the season to focus on other sports.

== College career ==
Carr played in all 12 games as a true freshman for the Colorado Buffaloes and had 272 rushing yards on 66 carries with four touchdowns. Carr finished the season being named Colorado's freshman player of the year and was on the all-NCAA 2nd team freshman roster. However, Carr transferred to the University of Houston following a family incident that left him wanting to return to his hometown.

After sitting out a season due to NCAA transfer regulations, Carr played sparingly as a reserve tailback for the Houston Cougars, rushing 26 yards on 4 carries in his sophomore year. He was bumped to a shared starting position with Mulbah Car as a junior, seeing time in all games and leading his team in rushing yards with 868 yards for 5 touchdowns on 151 carries, averaging 5.7 yards per carry. He reclaimed his starting role at the beginning of his senior year, but ended up missing most of the season due to injury and was only able to start three games. Regardless, he recorded 380 yards and 5 touchdowns on 67 carries, again averaging 5.7 yards per carry. He was also a selection for the 2017-2018 All-American academic team. He finished his career with 1,546 yards for 13 touchdowns on 227 carries, averaging 6.0 yards per carry.

== Professional career ==
=== Seattle Seahawks ===
Although Carr ultimately went undrafted, he agreed to sign with the Seattle Seahawks hours following the 2020 NFL draft. He officially signed with the team on May 4, 2020. He was waived on July 26, 2020, but was re-signed on August 14, 2020. He was waived/injured on August 31, 2020, and subsequently reverted to the team's injured reserve list the next day.

=== Ottawa Redblacks ===
On October 10, 2021, Carr signed with the Ottawa Redblacks of the Canadian Football League (CFL). On January 13, 2022, he was released by the Redblacks following the 2021 season.

=== Seamen Milano ===
On Novembre 27, 2023, Carr signed with the Seamen Milano, italian side of the European League of Football. He will play with the italian franchise in the 2024 season. Carr was released by the Seamen on June 13, 2024.
