= 2018 American Athletic Conference football season =

- League: NCAA Division I Football Bowl Subdivision)
- Sport: Football
- Duration: August 30, 2018 through January 2019
- Teams: 12
- TV partner(s): ABC, ESPN, ESPN2, ESPNU, and CBS Sports Network

2019 NFL Draft
- Top draft pick: Ed Oliver (Houston)
- Picked by: Buffalo Bills, 9th overall

Regular season

The American Championship
- Venue: Spectrum Stadium
- Champions: UCF Knights
- Runners-up: Memphis Tigers
- Finals MVP: Darriel Mack Jr.

Football seasons
- 2017 2019

2018 American Athletic Conference football standings
| | Conf. | | | Overall |
| Team | W | | L | W | | L |
|---|---|---|---|---|---|---|
East Division
| No. 11 UCF x$ | 8 | – | 0 | 12 | – | 1 |
| Temple | 7 | – | 1 | 8 | – | 5 |
| No. 24 Cincinnati | 6 | – | 2 | 11 | – | 2 |
| South Florida | 3 | – | 5 | 7 | – | 6 |
| East Carolina | 1 | – | 7 | 3 | – | 9 |
| UConn | 0 | – | 8 | 1 | – | 11 |
West Division
| Memphis xy | 5 | – | 3 | 8 | – | 6 |
| Houston x | 5 | – | 3 | 8 | – | 5 |
| Tulane x | 5 | – | 3 | 7 | – | 6 |
| SMU | 4 | – | 4 | 5 | – | 7 |
| Navy | 2 | – | 6 | 3 | – | 10 |
| Tulsa | 2 | – | 6 | 3 | – | 9 |
Championship: UCF 56, Memphis 41
$ – Conference champion; x – Division champion/co-champions; y – Championship game participant; Rankings from AP Poll

The 2018 American Athletic Conference football season was the 27th NCAA Division I FBS Football season of the American Athletic Conference (The American). The season was the sixth since the former Big East Conference dissolved and became the American Athletic Conference, (Note: The American is the legal all-sports successor to the Big East Conference (1979–2013). The Big East was rebranded and reorganized as the American Athletic Conference on July 1, 2013.) and the fifth season with the College Football Playoff in place. The American is considered a member of the "Group of Five" (G5), (Note: The other conferences in the "Group of Five are Conference USA (C–USA), the Mid–American Conference (MAC), the Mountain West Conference and the Sun Belt Conference.) meaning that the conference shares with the other G5 conferences one automatic spot in the New Year's Six bowl games.

== Preseason ==
=== Recruiting classes ===
National Rankings
| Team | ESPN | Rivals | 24/7 |
|---|---|---|---|
| Cincinnati | 75 | 47 | 47 |
| Connecticut | | 89 | 104 |
| East Carolina | | 85 | 87 |
| Houston | 75 | 60 | 72 |
| Memphis | | 81 | 88 |
| Navy | | 91 | 102 |
| SMU | | 81 | 86 |
| South Florida | 55 | 56 | 64 |
| Temple | | 76 | 80 |
| Tulane | 72 | 65 | 68 |
| Tulsa | | 86 | 97 |
| UCF | 70 | 67 | 70 |

== American Athletic Conference Media Day ==
The American Athletic Conference Media Day took place July 18 in Newport, Rhode Island.

=== Preseason Media Poll ===
AAC Champion Voting

- UCF – 19
- Memphis – 7
- USF – 3
- Houston – 1

East

1. UCF (175 pts., 25 votes)
2. USF (140 pts., 5 votes)
3. Temple (132 pts.)
4. Cincinnati (91 pts.)
5. Connecticut (51 pts.)
6. East Carolina (41 pts.)

West

1. Memphis (171 pts., 23 votes)
2. Houston (146 pts., 4 votes)
3. Navy (129 pts., 3 votes)
4. SMU (72 pts.)
5. Tulane (68 pts.)
6. Tulsa (44 pts.)

=== Fifth Anniversary Football Team ===
with 2018 marking the Fifth Year of American Athletic Conference Football under the new league, the Conference announced the Fifth Anniversary Team

FIFTH ANNIVERSARY FOOTBALL TEAM; AMERICAN ATHLETIC CONFERENCE
| Offense | Defense |
| QB – Keenan Reynolds, Navy; RB – D'Angelo Brewer, Tulsa; RB – Marlon Mack, USF; WR – Zay Jones, ECU; WR – Anthony Miller, Memphis; WR – Courtland Sutton, SMU; TE – Jordan Akins, UCF; OT – Kofi Amichia, USF; OT – Dion Dawkins, Temple; OT – Eric Lefeld, Cincinnati; OG – E.K. Binns, Navy; OG – Adam West, Navy; C – Kyle Friend, Temple | DL – Matt Ioannidis, Temple; DL – Justin Lawler, USF; DL – Ed Oliver, Houston; DL – Haason Reddick, Temple; DL – Marcus Smith, Louisville; LB – Genard Avery, UCF; LB – Shaquem Griffin, UCF; LB – Tyler Matakevich, Temple; LB – Auggie Sanchez, USF; CB – Jacoby Glenn, USF; CB – Mike Hughes, UCF; CB – Parry Nickerson, Tulane; S – Clayton Geathers, UCF; S – Obi Melifonwu, UConn; PK – Jake Elliott, Memphis; P – Tom Hornsey, Memphis; RS – Tony Pollard, Memphis |

== Head coaches ==
=== Coaching changes ===
There were two coaching changes after the regular season ended, On December 2, 2017 Scott Frost left UCF to take the Nebraska job, but stayed on to coach in the AAC Championship game and Peach Bowl, UCF ended up hiring Missouri Offensive Coordinator Josh Heupel. On December 7, 2017, SMU coach Chad Morris left to take the Arkansas job, on December 12, 2017, former Cal coach Sonny Dykes was hired as the new SMU coach.

=== Coaches ===
Note: All stats current through the completion of the 2017 season

| Team | Head coach | Years at school | Overall record | Record at school | AAC record |
|---|---|---|---|---|---|
| Cincinnati | Luke Fickell | 2 | 10–15 (.400) | 4–8 (.333) | 2–6 (.250) |
| Connecticut | Randy Edsall | 14 | 99–113 (.467) | 77–79 (.494) | 24–32 (.429) |
| East Carolina | Scottie Montgomery | 3 | 6–18 (.250) | 6–18 (.250) | 3–13 (.188) |
| Houston | Major Applewhite | 2 | 7–6 (.538) | 7–6 (.538) | 5–3 (.625) |
| Memphis | Mike Norvell | 2 | 18–8 (.692) | 18–8 (.692) | 12–4 (.750) |
| Navy | Ken Niumatalolo | 11 | 84–48 (.636) | 84–48 (.636) | 18–6 (.750) |
| SMU | Sonny Dykes | 2 | 41–46 (.471) | 0–1 (.000) | 0–0 (–) |
| South Florida | Charlie Strong | 2 | 63–39 (.618) | 10–2 (.833) | 26–11 (.703) |
| Temple | Geoff Collins | 2 | 7–6 (.538) | 7–6 (.538) | 4–4 (.500) |
| Tulane | Willie Fritz | 3 | 163–84 (.660) | 9–15 (.375) | 4–12 (.250) |
| Tulsa | Philip Montgomery | 4 | 18–20 (.474) | 18–20 (.474) | 10–15 (.400) |
| UCF | Josh Heupel | 1 | 0–0 (–) | 0–0 (–) | 0–0 (–) |

== Rankings ==
Legend
| | Increase in ranking |
| | Decrease in ranking |
| | Not ranked previous week |
| RV | Received votes but were not ranked in Top 25 of poll |

| | | Pre | Wk 2 | Wk 3 | Wk 4 | Wk 5 | Wk 6 | Wk 7 | Wk 8 | Wk 9 | Wk 10 | Wk 11 | Wk 12 | Wk 13 | Wk 14 | Wk 15 | Final |
|---|---|---|---|---|---|---|---|---|---|---|---|---|---|---|---|---|---|
| Cincinnati | AP | | | | | RV | RV | 25 | 20 | RV | RV | 25 | 19 | RV | RV | RV | 24 |
| Cincinnati | C | RV | RV | RV | RV | RV | RV | 25 | 21 | RV | RV | 23 | 20 | RV | RV | RV | 23 |
| Cincinnati | CFP | Not released | | | | | | | | | | | 24 | | | | |
| Connecticut | AP | | | | | | | | | | | | | | | | |
| Connecticut | C | | | | | | | | | | | | | | | | |
| Connecticut | CFP | Not released | | | | | | | | | | | | | | | |
| East Carolina | AP | | | | | | | | | | | | | | | | |
| East Carolina | C | | | | | | | | | | | | | | | | |
| East Carolina | CFP | Not released | | | | | | | | | | | | | | | |
| Houston | AP | RV | RV | RV | | | | | RV | RV | 17 | RV | | RV | | | |
| Houston | C | RV | RV | RV | RV | | | | RV | RV | 17 | RV | | | | | |
| Houston | CFP | Not released | | | | | | | | | | | | | | | |
| Memphis | AP | RV | RV | | | | | | | | | | | | | | |
| Memphis | C | RV | RV | RV | | | | | | | | | | | RV | | |
| Memphis | CFP | Not released | | | | | | | | | | | | | | | |
| Navy | AP | | | | | | | | | | | | | | | | |
| Navy | C | | | | | | | | | | | | | | | | |
| Navy | CFP | Not released | | | | | | | | | | | | | | | |
| SMU | AP | | | | | | | | | | | | | | | | |
| SMU | C | | | | | | | | | | | | | | | | |
| SMU | CFP | Not released | | | | | | | | | | | | | | | |
| South Florida | AP | | | RV | RV | RV | RV | 23 | 21 | 21 | RV | | | | | | |
| South Florida | C | RV | RV | RV | RV | RV | RV | 23 | 20 | 20 | RV | RV | | | | | |
| South Florida | CFP | Not released | | | | | | | | | | | | | | | |
| Temple | AP | | | | | | | | | | | | | | | | |
| Temple | C | | | | | | | | | | | | | | | | |
| Temple | CFP | Not released | | | | | | | | | | | | | | | |
| Tulane | AP | | | | | | | | | | | | | | | | |
| Tulane | C | | | | | | | | | | | | | | | | |
| Tulane | CFP | Not released | | | | | | | | | | | | | | | |
| Tulsa | AP | | | | | | | | | | | | | | | | |
| Tulsa | C | | | | | | | | | | | | | | | | |
| Tulsa | CFP | Not released | | | | | | | | | | | | | | | |
| UCF | AP | 21 | 19 | 18 | 16 | 13 | 12 | 10 | 10 | 10 | 9 | 11 | 11 | 8 | 7 | 7 | 11 |
| UCF | C | 23 | 20 | 18 | 18 | 14 | 13 | 9 | 9 | 10 | 9 | 11 | 11 | 9 | 7 | 7 | 12 |
| UCF | CFP | Not released | | | | | | | | | 12 | 12 | 11 | 9 | 8 | 8 | |

== Schedule ==
Index to colors and formatting
American member won
American member loss
American teams in **bold**

=== Week 1 ===
| Date | Time | Visiting team | Home team | Site | TV | Result | Attendance | Ref. |
|---|---|---|---|---|---|---|---|---|
| August 30 | 7:00 p.m. | No. 21 **UCF** | **Connecticut** | Rentschler Field • East Hartford, CT | ESPNU | **UCF** 56–17 | 23,081 | |
| August 30 | 8:00 p.m. | Wake Forest | **Tulane** | Yulman Stadium • New Orleans, LA | CBSSN | **L** 17–23 ^{OT} | 15,478 | |
| September 1 | Noon | Villanova | **Temple** | Lincoln Financial Field • Philadelphia, PA (Mayor's Cup) | ESPNews | **L** 17–19 | 32,357 | |
| September 1 | Noon | **Houston** | Rice | Rice Stadium • Houston, TX (rivalry) | CBSSN | **W** 45–27 | 26,390 | |
| September 1 | 6:00 p.m. | Elon | **South Florida** | Raymond James Stadium • Tampa, FL | ESPN3 | **W** 34–14 | 31,217 | |
| September 1 | 7:00 p.m. | Central Arkansas | **Tulsa** | H. A. Chapman Stadium • Tulsa, OK | ESPN3 | **W** 38–27 | 18,356 | |
| September 1 | 7:00 p.m. | Mercer | **Memphis** | Liberty Bowl Memorial Stadium • Memphis, TN | ESPN3 | **W** 66–14 | 33,697 | |
| September 1 | 7:00 p.m. | **Cincinnati** | UCLA | Rose Bowl • Pasadena, CA | ESPN | **W** 26–17 | 54,116 | |
| September 1 | 7:30 pm | **SMU** | North Texas | Apogee Stadium • Deton, TX (Safeway Bowl) | Stadium | **L** 23–46 | 29,519 | |
| September 1 | 11:00 p.m. | **Navy** | Hawaii | Aloha Stadium • Honolulu, HI | CBSSN | **L** 41–59 | 29,702 | |
| September 2 | 3:30 p.m. | No. 14 (FCS) North Carolina A&T | **East Carolina** | Dowdy–Ficklen Stadium • Greenville, NC | ESPN3 | **L** 23–28 | 38,640 | |
^{#}Rankings from AP Poll released prior to game. All times are in Eastern Time.

=== Week 2 ===
| Date | Time | Visiting team | Home team | Site | TV | Result | Attendance | Ref. |
|---|---|---|---|---|---|---|---|---|
| September 7 | 7:00 p.m. | No. 16 TCU | **SMU** | Gerald J. Ford Stadium • Dallas, TX (Rivalry) | ESPN2 | **L** 12–42 | 24,216 | |
| September 8 | Noon | Arizona | **Houston** | TDECU Stadium • Houston, TX | ABC/ESPN2 | **W** 45–18 | 32,534 | |
| September 8 | Noon | Georgia Tech | **South Florida** | Raymond James Stadium • Tampa, FL | ABC | **W** 49–38 | 34,182 | |
| September 8 | 3:30 p.m. | **Memphis** | **Navy** | Navy–Marine Corps Memorial Stadium • Annapolis, MD | CBSSN | **Navy** 22–21 | 31,762 | |
| September 8 | 3:30 p.m. | Buffalo | **Temple** | Lincoln Financial Field • Philadelphia, PA | ESPN3 | **L** 29–36 | 25,511 | |
| September 8 | 3:30 p.m. | North Carolina | **East Carolina** | Dowdy–Ficklen Stadium • Greenville, NC | ESPNU | **W** 41–19 | 39,298 | |
| September 8 | 6:00 pm | South Carolina State | No. 19 **UCF** | Spectrum Stadium • Orlando, FL | ESPN3 | **W** 38–0 | 43,269 | |
| September 8 | 8:00 p.m. | Miami (OH) | **Cincinnati** | Paul Brown Stadium • Cincinnati, OH (Victory Bell) | ESPN3 | **W** 21–0 | 65,515 | |
| September 8 | 8:00 p.m. | No. 11 (FCS) Nicholls State | **Tulane** | Yulman Stadium • New Orleans, LA | ESPN3 | **W** 42–17 | 21,092 | |
| September 8 | 8:00 p.m. | **Tulsa** | Texas | Darrell K Royal–Texas Memorial Stadium • Austin TX | LHN | **L** 21–28 | 90563 | |
| September 8 | 10:15 p.m. | **Connecticut** | No. 20 Boise State | Albertsons Stadium • Boise, ID | ESPNU | **L** 7–62 | 34,515 | |
^{#}Rankings from AP Poll released prior to game. All times are in Eastern Time.

=== Week 3 ===
| Date | Time | Visiting team | Home team | Site | TV | Result | Attendance | Ref. |
|---|---|---|---|---|---|---|---|---|
| September 14 | 7:00 p.m. | Georgia State | **Memphis** | Liberty Bowl Memorial Stadium • Memphis, TN | ESPN | **W** 59–22 | 27,678 | |
| ~~September 15~~ | ~~Noon~~ | ~~No. 18 **UCF**~~ | ~~North Carolina~~ | ~~Kenan Memorial Stadium~~ • ~~Chapel Hill, NC~~ | ~~ESPNU~~ | **Cancelled** (Note: This game has been cancelled in anticipation of Hurricane Florence.) | | |
| September 15 | Noon | Rhode Island | **Connecticut** | Rentschler Field • East Hartford, CT (Rivalry) | SNY/ESPN3 | **W** 56–49 | 20,691 | |
| September 15 | Noon | **Temple** | Maryland | Maryland Stadium • College Park, MD | BTN | **W** 35–14 | 32,057 | |
| September 15 | Noon | **Tulane** | UAB | Legion Field • Birmingham, AL | Stadium | **L** 24–31 | 21,991 | |
| ~~September 15~~ | ~~12:20 p.m.~~ | ~~**East Carolina**~~ | ~~No. 13 Virginia Tech~~ | ~~Lane Stadium~~ • ~~Blacksburg, VA~~ | ~~ACCN~~ | **Cancelled** | | |
| September 15 | 3:30 p.m. | **South Florida** | Illinois | Soldier Field • Chicago, IL | BTN | **W** 25–19 | 21,725 | |
| September 15 | 3:30 p.m. | Lehigh | **Navy** | Navy–Marine Corps Memorial Stadium • Annapolis, MD | CBSSN | **W** 51–21 | 30,011 | |
| September 15 | 3:30 p.m. | **SMU** | No. 19 Michigan | Michigan Stadium • Ann Arbor, MI | BTN | **L** 20–45 | 110,549 | |
| September 15 | 4:00 p.m. | **Houston** | Texas Tech | Jones AT&T Stadium • Lubbock, TX | FOX | **L** 49–63 | 53,484 | |
| September 15 | 7:00 p.m. | Alabama A&M | **Cincinnati** | Nippert Stadium • Cincinnati, OH | ESPN3 | **W** 63–7 | 28,834 | |
| September 15 | 7:00 p.m. | Arkansas State | **Tulsa** | H. A. Chapman Stadium • Tulsa, OK | CBSSN | **L** 20–29 | 17,349 | |
^{#}Rankings from AP Poll released prior to game. All times are in Eastern Time.

=== Week 4 ===
| Date | Time | Visiting team | Home team | Site | TV | Result | Attendance | Ref. |
|---|---|---|---|---|---|---|---|---|
| September 20 | 7:30 p.m. | **Tulsa** | **Temple** | Lincoln Financial Field • Philadelphia, PA | ESPN | **TEM** 31–17 | 24,217 | |
| September 21 | 7:00 p.m. | Florida Atlantic | No. 16 **UCF** | Spectrum Stadium • Orlando, FL | ESPN | **W** 56–36 | 44,257 | |
| September 22 | Noon | **Navy** | **SMU** | Gerald J. Ford Stadium • Dallas, TX (Gansz Trophy) | ESPNews | **SMU** 31–30 | 17,531 | |
| September 22 | Noon | Ohio | **Cincinnati** | Nippert Stadium • Cincinnati, OH | ESPNU | **W** 34–30 | 35,220 | |
| September 22 | 3:30 p.m. | **Tulane** | No. 4 Ohio State | Ohio Stadium • Columbus, OH | BTN | **L** 6–49 | 103,336 | |
| September 22 | 4:00 p.m. | **Connecticut** | Syracuse | Carrier Dome • Syracuse, NY | ESPNews | **L** 21–51 | 36,632 | |
| September 22 | 8:00 p.m. | Texas Southern | **Houston** | TDECU Stadium • Houston, TX | ESPN3 | **W** 70–14 | 29,970 | |
| September 22 | 8:00 p.m. | South Alabama | **Memphis** | Liberty Bowl Memorial Stadium • Memphis, TN | WMC/ESPN3 | **W** 52–35 | 27,765 | |
| September 22 | 8:00 p.m. | **East Carolina** | **South Florida** | Raymond James Stadium • Tampa, FL | ESPNews | **USF** 20–13 | 34,562 | |
^{#}Rankings from AP Poll released prior to game. All times are in Eastern Time.

=== Week 5 ===
| Date | Time | Visiting team | Home team | Site | TV | Result | Attendance | Ref. |
|---|---|---|---|---|---|---|---|---|
| September 28 | 8:00 p.m. | **Memphis** | **Tulane** | Yulman Stadium • New Orleans, LA | ESPN2 | **TULN** 40–24 | 16,631 | |
| September 29 | Noon | **Temple** | Boston College | Alumni Stadium • Chestnut Hill, MA | ESPNU | **L** 35–45 | 40,111 | |
| September 29 | 3:30 p.m. | Pittsburgh | No. 13 **UCF** | Gerald J. Ford Stadium • Dallas, TX | ESPNU | **W** 45–14 | 44,904 | |
| September 29 | 3:30 p.m. | Old Dominion | **East Carolina** | Dowdy–Ficklen Stadium • Greenville, NC | ESPN3 | **W** 37–35 | 35,047 | |
| September 29 | 3:30 p.m. | **Cincinnati** | **Connecticut** | Rentschler Field • East Hartford, CT | CBSSN | **CINCI** 49–7 | 20,322 | |
| September 29 | 7:00 p.m. | Houston Baptist | **SMU** | Gerald J. Ford Stadium • Dallas, TX | ESPN3 | **W** 63–27 | 18,983 | |
^{#}Rankings from AP Poll released prior to game. All times are in Eastern Time.

| Date | Bye Week |
|---|---|
| Sept. 29 | Tulsa, Navy, Houston, South Florida |

=== Week 6 ===
| Date | Time | Visiting team | Home team | Site | TV | Result | Attendance | Ref. |
|---|---|---|---|---|---|---|---|---|
| October 4 | 8:00 p.m. | Tulsa | **Houston** | TDECU Stadium • Houston, TX | ESPN | **HOU** 41–26 | 29,823 | |
| October 6 | Noon | Tulane | **Cincinnati** | Nippert Stadium • Cincinnati, OH | ESPNU | **CIN** 37–21 | 32,200 | |
| October 6 | Noon | East Carolina | **Temple** | Lincoln Financial Field • Philadelphia, PA | ESPNews | **TEM** 49–6 | 26,681 | |
| October 6 | 3:30 p.m | Navy | Air Force | Falcon Stadium • Colorado Springs, CO (Commander-in-Chief's Trophy) | CBSSN | **L** 7–35 | 40,175 | |
| October 6 | 3:30 p.m. | South Florida | Massachusetts | Warren McGuirk Alumni Stadium • Hadley, MA | ELVN | **W** 58–42 | 7,988 | |
| October 6 | 7:00 p.m. | Connecticut | **Memphis** | Liberty Bowl Memorial Stadium • Memphis, TN | CBSSN | **MEM** 55–14 | 27,581 | |
| October 6 | 7:00 p.m. | SMU | No. 12 **UCF** | Spectrum Stadium • Orlando, FL | ESPNU | **UCF** 48–20 | 40,856 | |
^{#}Rankings from AP Poll released prior to game. All times are in Eastern Time.

=== Week 7 ===
| Date | Time | Visiting team | Home team | Site | TV | Result | Attendance | Ref. |
|---|---|---|---|---|---|---|---|---|
| October 12 | 7:00 p.m. | No. 23 **South Florida** | **Tulsa** | H. A. Chapman Stadium • Tulsa, OK | ESPN | **USF** 25–24 | 16,142 | |
| October 13 | 3:30 p.m. | **Temple** | **Navy** | Navy–Marine Corps Memorial Stadium • Annapolis, MD | CBSSN | **TEM** 24–17 | 30,106 | |
| October 13 | 3:30 p.m. | No. 10 **UCF** | **Memphis** | Liberty Bowl Memorial Stadium • Memphis, TN | ABC/ESPN2 | **UCF** 31–30 | 38,831 | |
| October 13 | 7:00 p.m. | **Houston** | **East Carolina** | Dowdy–Ficklen Stadium • Greenville, NC | CBSSN | **HOU** 42–20 | 29,851 | |
^{#}Rankings from AP Poll released prior to game. All times are in Eastern Time.

| Date | Bye Week |
|---|---|
| Oct. 13 | Tulane, SMU, Cincinnati, Connecticut |

=== Week 8 ===
| Date | Time | Visiting team | Home team | Site | TV | Result | Attendance | Ref. |
|---|---|---|---|---|---|---|---|---|
| October 20 | Noon | **Tulsa** | Arkansas | Donald W. Reynolds Razorback Stadium • Fayetteville, AR | SECN | **L** 0–23 | 56,691 | |
| October 20 | Noon | No. 20 **Cincinnati** | **Temple** | Lincoln Financial Field • Philadelphia, PA | ESPNU | **TEM** 24–17 ^{OT} | 33,026 | |
| October 20 | 3:30 p.m. | **SMU** | **Tulane** | Yulman Stadium • New Orleans, LA | ESPNU | **SMU** 27–23 | 13,987 | |
| October 20 | 3:30 p.m. | **Houston** | **Navy** | Navy–Marine Corps Memorial Stadium • Annapolis, MD | CBSSN | **HOU** 49–36 | 33,924 | |
| October 20 | 4:00 p.m. | **Memphis** | Missouri | Faurot Field • Columbia, MO | SECN | **L** 33–65 | 52,917 | |
| October 20 | 7:00 p.m. | No. 10 **UCF** | **East Carolina** | Dowdy–Ficklen Stadium • Greenville, NC (Rivalry) | ESPN2 | **UCF** 37–10 | 31,159 | |
| October 20 | 7:00 p.m. | **Connecticut** | No. 21 **South Florida** | Raymond James Stadium • Tampa, FL | CBSSN | **USF** 38–30 | 42,127 | |
^{#}Rankings from AP Poll released prior to game. All times are in Eastern Time.

=== Week 9 ===
| Date | Time | Visiting team | Home team | Site | TV | Result | Attendance | Ref. |
|---|---|---|---|---|---|---|---|---|
| October 27 | Noon | Massachusetts | **Connecticut** | Rentschler Field • East Hartford, CT (Rivalry) | ESPNU | **L** 17–22 | 24,150 | |
| October 27 | 3:30 p.m. | **Cincinnati** | **SMU** | Gerald J. Ford Stadium • Dallas, TX | CBSSN | **CIN** 26–20 ^{OT} | 16,121 | |
| October 27 | 3:30 p.m. | No. 21 **South Florida** | **Houston** | TDECU Stadium • Houston, TX | ABC/ESPN2 | **HOU** 57–36 | 31,631 | |
| October 27 | 7:00 p.m. | **Tulane** | **Tulsa** | H. A. Chapman Stadium • Tulsa, OK | ESPNU | **TULN** 24–17 | 16,133 | |
| October 27 | 8:00 p.m. | No. 3 Notre Dame | **Navy** | SDCCU Stadium • San Diego, CA (Rip Miller Trophy) | CBS | **L** 22–44 | 63,626 | |
^{#}Rankings from AP Poll released prior to game. All times are in Eastern Time.

| Date | Bye Week |
|---|---|
| Oct. 27 | Memphis, UCF, Temple, East Carolina |

=== Week 10 ===
| Date | Time | Visiting team | Home team | Site | TV | Result | Attendance | Ref. |
|---|---|---|---|---|---|---|---|---|
| November 1 | 7:30 p.m. | **Temple** | No. 9 **UCF** | Spectrum Stadium • Orlando, FL | ESPN | **UCF** 52–40 | 41,153 | |
| November 3 | Noon | **Memphis** | **East Carolina** | Dowdy–Ficklen Stadium • Greenville, NC | ESPNU | **MEM** 59–41 | 29,127 | |
| November 3 | 3:30 p.m. | **Tulane** | **South Florida** | Raymond James Stadium • Tampa, FL | CBSSN | **TULN** 41–15 | 31,388 | |
| November 3 | 3:30 p.m. | **Navy** | **Cincinnati** | Nippert Stadium • Cincinnati, OH | ESPNU | **CIN** 42–0 | 36,318 | |
| November 3 | 7:00 p.m. | **Connecticut** | **Tulsa** | H. A. Chapman Stadium • Tulsa, OK | CBSSN | **TULSA** 49–19 | 17,451 | |
| November 3 | 7:00 p.m. | No. 17 **Houston** | **SMU** | Gerald J. Ford Stadium • Dallas, TX (rivalry) | ESPNU | **SMU** 45–31 | 23,654 | |
^{#}Rankings from AP Poll released prior to game. All times are in Eastern Time.

=== Week 11 ===
| Date | Time | Visiting team | Home team | Site | TV | Result | Attendance | Ref. |
|---|---|---|---|---|---|---|---|---|
| November 10 | 12:00 p.m. | Tulsa | **Memphis** | Liberty Bowl Memorial Stadium • Memphis, TN | ESPNU | **MEM** 47–21 | 27,905 | |
| November 10 | 12:00 p.m. | SMU | **Connecticut** | Rentschler Field • East Hartford, CT | ESPN3 | **SMU** 62–50 | 19,096 | |
| November 10 | 12:00 p.m. | Navy | No. 11 **UCF** | Spectrum Stadium • Orlando, FL | ESPN2 | **UCF** 35–24 | 44,738 | |
| November 10 | 4:00 p.m. | East Carolina | **Tulane** | Yulman Stadium • New Orleans, LA | ESPNews | **TULN** 24–18 | 20,860 | |
| November 10 | 7:00 p.m. | Temple | **Houston** | TDECU Stadium • Houston, TX | CBSSN | **TEMP** 59–49 | 30,862 | |
| November 10 | 7:00 p.m. | South Florida | No. 25 **Cincinnati** | Nippert Stadium • Cincinnati, OH | ESPNU | **CIN** 25–23 | 29,310 | |
^{#}Rankings from AP Poll released prior to game. All times are in Eastern Time.

=== Week 12 ===
| Date | Time | Visiting team | Home team | Site | TV | Result | Attendance | Ref. |
|---|---|---|---|---|---|---|---|---|
| November 15 | 8:00 p.m. | Tulane | **Houston** | TDECU Stadium • Houston, TX | ESPN | **HOU** 48–17 | 24,209 | |
| November 16 | 9:00 p.m. | Memphis | **SMU** | Gerald J. Ford Stadium • Dallas, TX | ESPN2 | **MEM** 28–18 | 15,794 | |
| November 17 | Noon | South Florida | **Temple** | Lincoln Financial Field • Philadelphia, PA | ESPNews | **TEM** 27–17 | 21,029 | |
| November 17 | 3:30 p.m. | Tulsa | **Navy** | Navy–Marine Corps Memorial Stadium • Annapolis, MD | CBSSN | **NAVY** 37–29 | 31,517 | |
| November 17 | 7:00 p.m. | Connecticut | **East Carolina** | Dowdy-Ficklin Stadium • Greenville, NC | CBSSN | **ECU** 55–21 | 27,234 | |
| November 17 | 8:00 p.m. | Cincinnati | No. 11 **UCF** | Spectrum Stadium • Orlando, FL | ABC | **UCF** 38–13 | 47,795 | |
^{#}Rankings from AP Poll released prior to game. All times are in Eastern Time.

=== Week 13 ===
| Date | Time | Visiting team | Home team | Site | TV | Result | Attendance | Ref. |
|---|---|---|---|---|---|---|---|---|
| November 23 | Noon | **Houston** | Memphis | Liberty Bowl Memorial Stadium • Memphis, TN | ABC | **MEM** 52–31 | 27,790 | |
| November 23 | 3:30 p.m. | **East Carolina** | Cincinnati | Nippert Stadium • Cincinnati, OH | CBSSN | **CIN** 56–6 | 21,230 | |
| November 23 | 4:15 p.m. | No. 8 **UCF** | South Florida | Raymond James Stadium • Tampa, FL (War on I–4) | ESPN | **UCF** 38–10 | 57,626 | |
| November 24 | Noon | **Navy** | Tulane | Yulman Stadium • New Orleans, LA | ESPNU | **TULN** 29–28 | 20,042 | |
| November 24 | 3:30 p.m. | **Temple** | Connecticut | Rentschler Field • East Hartford, CT | ESPNU | **TEM** 57–7 | 18,203 | |
| November 24 | 3:30 p.m. | **SMU** | Tulsa | H. A. Chapman Stadium • Tulsa, OK | CBSSN | **TLSA** 27–24 | 17,159 | |
^{#}Rankings from AP Poll released prior to game. All times are in Eastern Time.

=== Week 14 ===
| Date | Time | Visiting team | Home team | Site | TV | Result | Attendance | Ref. |
|---|---|---|---|---|---|---|---|---|
| December 1 | Noon | **East Carolina** | NC State | Carter–Finley Stadium • Raleigh, NC | ACCN Extra | **L** 3–58 | 57,223 | |
^{#}Rankings from AP Poll released prior to game. All times are in Eastern Time.

==== AAC Championship game ====
| Date | Time | Visiting team | Home team | Site | TV | Result | Attendance | Ref. |
|---|---|---|---|---|---|---|---|---|
| December 1 | 3:30 pm | **Memphis** | No. 7 **UCF** | Spectrum Stadium • Orlando, FL | ABC | **UCF** 56–41 | 45,176 | |
^{#}Rankings from AP Poll released prior to game. All times are in Eastern Time.

=== Week 15 ===
| Date | Time | Visiting team | Home team | Site | TV | Result | Attendance | Ref. |
|---|---|---|---|---|---|---|---|---|
| December 8 | 3:00 p.m. | No. 22 Army | **Navy** | Lincoln Financial Field • Philadelphia, PA (Commander-in-Chief's Trophy) | CBS | **L** 10–17 | 66,729 | |
^{#}Rankings from AP Poll released prior to game. All times are in Eastern Time.

== Bowl games ==
Legend
| The American win |
| The American loss |

| Bowl game | Date | Site | Television | Time | American team | Opponent | Score | Attendance |
|---|---|---|---|---|---|---|---|---|
| Cure Bowl | December 15 | Camping World Stadium • Orlando, FL | CBSSN | 2:30 p.m. | Tulane | Louisiana | 41–24 | 19,066 |
| Gasparilla Bowl | December 20 | Raymond James Stadium • Tampa, FL | ESPN | 8:00 p.m. | South Florida | Marshall | 20–38 | 14,135 |
| Birmingham Bowl | December 22 | Legion Field • Birmingham, AL | ESPN | Noon | Memphis | Wake Forest | 34–37 | 25,717 |
| Armed Forces | December 22 | Amon G. Carter Stadium • Fort Worth, TX | ESPN | 3:30 p.m. | Houston | Army | 14–70 | 44,738 |
| Independence | December 27 | Independence Stadium • Shreveport, LA | ESPN | 1:30 p.m. | Temple | Duke | 27–56 | 27,492 |
| Military Bowl | December 30 | Navy–Marine Corps Memorial Stadium • Annapolis, MD | ESPN | Noon | Cincinnati | Virginia Tech | 35–31 | 32,832 |
New Years Six bowl games
| Fiesta Bowl | January 1 | State Farm Stadium • Glendale, AZ | ESPN | 1:00 p.m. | No. 8 UCF | No. 11 LSU | 32–40 | 57,246 |

(Rankings from final CFP Poll; All times Eastern)

== American vs other conferences ==
=== American vs Power conference matchups ===
This is a list of the power conference teams (ACC, Big 10, Big 12, Notre Dame, Pac-12 and SEC) The American will playing during the 2018 season.

| Date | Visitor | Home | Site | Score |
|---|---|---|---|---|
| August 30 | Wake Forest | Tulane | Yulman Stadium • New Orleans, LA | 17–23 ^{OT} |
| September 1 | Cincinnati | UCLA | Rose Bowl • Pasadena, CA | 26–17 |
| September 7 | TCU | SMU | Ford Staduium • Dallas, TX | 12–42 |
| September 8 | Arizona | Houston | TDECU Stadium • Houston, TX | 45–18 |
| September 8 | North Carolina | East Carolina | Dowdy-Ficklen Stadium • Greenville, NC | 41–19 |
| September 8 | Georgia Tech | South Florida | Raymond James Stadium • Tampa, FL | 49–38 |
| September 8 | Tulsa | Texas | Darrell K Royal–Texas Memorial Stadium • Austin, TX | 21–28 |
| September 15 | Temple | Maryland | Maryland Stadium • College Park, MD | 35–14 |
| September 15 | South Florida | Illinois | Soldier Field • Chicago, IL | 25–19 |
| September 15 | SMU | Michigan | Michigan Stadium • Ann Arbor, MI | 20–45 |
| September 15 | Houston | Texas Tech | Jones AT&T Stadium • Lubbock, TX | 49–63 |
| September 22 | Tulane | Ohio State | Ohio Stadium • Columbus, OH | 6–49 |
| September 22 | Connecticut | Syracuse | Carrier Dome • Syracuse, NY | 21–51 |
| September 29 | Pittsburgh | No. 13 UCF | Spectrum Stadium • Orlando, FL | 45–14 |
| September 29 | Temple | Boston College | Alumni Stadium • Chestnut Hill, MA | 35–45 |
| October 20 | Memphis | Missouri | Faurot Field • Columbia, MO | 33–65 |
| October 20 | Tulsa | Arkansas | Donald W. Reynolds Razorback Stadium • Fayetteville, AR | 0–23 |
| October 27 | Notre Dame | Navy | SDCCU Stadium • San Diego, CA | 22–44 |
| December 1 | East Carolina | NC State | Carter–Finley Stadium • Raleigh, NC | 3–58 |

=== Records against other conferences ===
Regular Season

| Power Conferences | Record |
|---|---|
| ACC | 3–4 |
| Big Ten | 2–2 |
| Big 12 | 0–3 |
| Notre Dame | 0–1 |
| Pac-12 | 2–0 |
| SEC | 0–2 |
| Power Conference Total | 7–12 |
| Other FBS Conferences | Record |
| C-USA | 3–2 |
| Independents (excluding Notre Dame) | 1–1 |
| MAC | 2–1 |
| Mountain West | 0–3 |
| Sun Belt | 2–2 |
| Other FBS Total | 8–8 |
| FCS Opponents | Record |
| CAA | 2–1 |
| MEAC | 1–1 |
| Patriot | 1–0 |
| Southland | 3–0 |
| Southern | 1–0 |
| SWAC | 2–0 |
| FCS Total | 10–2 |
| Total Non-Conference Record | 25–22 |

Post Season

| Power Conferences | Record |
|---|---|
| ACC | 1–2 |
| SEC | 0–1 |
| Power Conferences Total | 1–3 |
| Other FBS Conferences | Record |
| C-USA | 0–1 |
| Independent | 0–1 |
| Sun Belt | 1–0 |
| Other FBS Total | 1–2 |
| Total Bowl Record | 2–5 |

== Awards and honors ==
=== Players of the week ===
| Week | Offensive | | | Defensive | | | Special Teams | | |
| Week | Player | Position | Team | Player | Position | Team | Player | Position | Team |
|---|---|---|---|---|---|---|---|---|---|
| Week 1 | McKenzie Milton | QB | UCF | Bryan Wright; Ed Oliver | LB; DT | Cincinnati; Houston | Thomas Bennett | P | Tulsa |
| Week 2 | D'Eriq King | QB | Houston | Sean Williams | S | Memphis | Terrence Horne Jr. | KR | South Florida |
| Week 3 | Darrell Henderson; Blake Barnett | RB; QB | Memphis; South Florida | Michael Dogbe | DT | Temple | Bennett Moehring | K | Navy |
| Week 4 | McKenzie Milton | QB | UCF | Quincy Roche | DE | Temple | Reggie Roberson Jr. | WR/KR | SMU |
| Week 5 | McKenzie Milton | QB | UCF | Nate Harvey | DE | East Carolina | Jake Verity | K | East Carolina |
| Week 6 | Jordan Cronkrite | RB | USF | Titus Davis | DE | UCF | Isaiah Wright | WR | Temple |
| Week 7 | McKenzie Milton | QB | UCF | Ed Oliver | DT | Houston | Matthew Wright; Coby Weiss | K K | UCF; USF |
| Week 8 | D'Eriq King | QB | Houston | Nate Evans; Austin Robinson | LB; LB | UCF; Houston | Matthew Wright | K | UCF |
| Week 9 | D'Eriq King | QB | Houston | James Wiggins | S | Cincinnati | Cole Smith | K | Cincinnati |
| Week 10 | Ben Hicks | QB | SMU | Cortez Broughton; Kyran Mitchell | DT; LB | Cincinnati; SMU | Merek Glover | K | SMU |
| Week 11 | Ryquell Armstead | RB | Temple | Roderic Teamer | S | Tulane | Pop Williams | WR | Memphis |
| Week 12 | Holton Ahlers | QB | East Carolina | Titus Davis | DE | UCF | Isaiah Wright | WR | Temple |
| Week 13 | Justin McMillian | QB | Tulane | Arquon Bush | CB | Cincinnati | Isaiah Wright | WR | Temple |

=== Conference awards ===
The following individuals received postseason honors as voted by the American Athletic Conference football coaches at the end of the season

2018 American Athletic Conference Individual Awards
| Award | Recipient(s) |
| Offensive Player of the Year | McKenzie Milton |
| Defensive Player of the Year | Nate Harvey |
| Special Teams Player of the Year | Isaiah Wright |
| Rookie of the Year | Desmond Ridder |
| Coach of the Year | Luke Fickell |

2018 All-American Athletic Conference Football Teams
| First Team | | Second Team | |
| Offense | Defense | Offense | Defense |
| WR – Trevon Brown, ECU; WR – Marquez Stevenson, Houston; WR – James Proche, SMU; OT – Dino Boyd, Cincinnati; OT – Jake Brown, UCF; OG – Cole Schneider, UCF; OG – Dustin Woodard, Memphis; C – Jordan Johnson, UCF; TE – Mitchell Wilcox, USF; QB – McKenzie Milton, UCF; RB – Darrell Henderson^, Memphis; RB – Ryquell Armstead, Temple; K – Jake Verity, ECU; RS – John Williams, Memphis; RS – Isaiah Wright, Temple | DL – Cortez Broughton, Cincinnati; DL – Nate Harvey, ECU; DL – Ed Oliver, Houston; DL – Michael Dogbe, Temple; LB – Nate Evans, UCF; LB – Perry Young, Cincinnati; LB – Austin Robinson, Houston; LB – Shaun Bradley, Temple; CB – Nevelle Clarke, UCF; CB – Rock Ya-Sin, Temple; S – Richie Grant, UCF; S – Delvon Randall, Temple; P – James Smith, Cincinnati | WR – Gabe Davis, UCF; WR – Damonte Coxie, Memphis; WR – Ventell Bryant, Temple; OT – Wyatt Miller, UCF; OT – Trevon Tate, Memphis; OG – Jovahn Fair, Temple; OG – Tyler Bowling, Tulsa; C – Garrett Campbell, Cincinnati; TE – Josiah Deguara, Cincinnati; QB – D'Eriq King, Houston; RB – Michael Warren II, Cincinnati; RB – Adrian Killins, UCF; K – Matthew Wright, UCF; RS – Adrian Killins, UCF | DL – Titus Davis, UCF; DL – Marquise Copeland, Cincinnati; DL – Brendon Hayes, UCF; DL – Kimoni Fitz, Cincinnati; DL – Patrick Johnson, Tulane; LB – Pat Jasinski, UCF; LB – Bryce Huff, Memphis; LB – Khalid McGee, USF; LB – Zachery Harris, Tulane; CB – TJ Carter, Memphis; CB – Donnie Lewis, Tulane; S – James Wiggins, Cincinnati; S – Roderic Teamer, Tulane; P – Thomas Bennett, Tulsa |
^{^} - denotes unanimous selection Additional players added to the All-American teams due to ties in the voting

== NFL draft ==
The following list includes all AAC players who were drafted in the 2019 NFL draft.

| Player | Position | School | Draft Round | Round Pick | Overall Pick | Team |
|---|---|---|---|---|---|---|
| Ed Oliver | DT | Houston | 1 | 9 | 9 | Buffalo Bills |
| Rock Ya-Sin | CB | Temple | 2 | 2 | 34 | Indianapolis Colts |
| Trysten Hill | DT | UCF | 2 | 26 | 58 | Dallas Cowboys |
| Darrell Henderson | RB | Memphis | 3 | 6 | 70 | Los Angeles Rams |
| Tony Pollard | RB | Memphis | 4 | 26 | 128 | Dallas Cowboys |
| Isaiah Johnson | CB | Houston | 4 | 27 | 129 | Oakland Raiders |
| Ryquell Armstead | RB | Temple | 5 | 2 | 140 | Jacksonville Jaguars |
| Emeke Egbule | LB | Houston | 6 | 27 | 200 | Los Angeles Chargers |
| Donnie Lewis | CB | Tulane | 7 | 7 | 221 | Cleveland Browns |
| Cortez Broughton | DT | Cincinnati | 7 | 28 | 242 | Los Angeles Chargers |
| Michael Dogbe | DE | Temple | 7 | 35 | 249 | Arizona Cardinals |
