= 2018 Cincinnati Bearcats football team =

American college football season

2018 Cincinnati Bearcats football

Military Bowl champion

Military Bowl, W 35–31 vs. Virginia Tech
- Conference: American Athletic Conference
- East Division

Ranking
- Coaches: No. 23
- AP: No. 24
- Record: 11–2 (6–2 The American)
- Head coach: Luke Fickell (2nd season)
- Offensive coordinator: Mike Denbrock (2nd season)
- Offensive scheme: Multiple
- Defensive coordinator: Marcus Freeman (2nd season)
- Base defense: 4–2–5
- Home stadium: Nippert Stadium

2018 American Athletic Conference football standings
	Conf.			Overall
Team	W		L	W		L
East Division
No. 11 UCF x$	8	–	0	12	–	1
Temple	7	–	1	8	–	5
No. 24 Cincinnati	6	–	2	11	–	2
South Florida	3	–	5	7	–	6
East Carolina	1	–	7	3	–	9
UConn	0	–	8	1	–	11
West Division
Memphis xy	5	–	3	8	–	6
Houston x	5	–	3	8	–	5
Tulane x	5	–	3	7	–	6
SMU	4	–	4	5	–	7
Navy	2	–	6	3	–	10
Tulsa	2	–	6	3	–	9
Championship: UCF 56, Memphis 41
$ – Conference champion; x – Division champion/co-champions; y – Championship game participant; Rankings from AP Poll

The 2018 Cincinnati Bearcats football team represented the University of Cincinnati in the 2018 NCAA Division I FBS football season. The Bearcats play their home games at Nippert Stadium, and are members of the East Division in the American Athletic Conference. They were led by second-year head coach Luke Fickell.

== Recruits ==
The Bearcats signed a total of 23 recruits.

College recruiting information (2018)
Name	Hometown	School	Height	Weight	Commit date
Ty Van Fossen; LB	Columbus, Ohio	St. Francis DeSales High School	6 ft 2 in (1.88 m)	205 lb (93 kg)	Mar 1, 2017
Ty Van Fossen; LB	Recruit ratings: Scout: Rivals: 247Sports: ESPN:				
Blake Bacevich; DE	Cincinnati, Ohio	St. Xavier High School	6 ft 4 in (1.93 m)	215 lb (98 kg)	Mar 25, 2017
Blake Bacevich; DE	Recruit ratings: Scout: Rivals: 247Sports: ESPN:				
Josh Whyle; TE	Cincinnati, Ohio	La Salle High School	6 ft 6 in (1.98 m)	215 lb (98 kg)	Apr 6, 2017
Josh Whyle; TE	Recruit ratings: Scout: Rivals: 247Sports: ESPN:				
Colin Woodside; OT	Lancaster, Ohio	Fairfield Union High School	6 ft 5 in (1.96 m)	265 lb (120 kg)	Apr 14, 2017
Colin Woodside; OT	Recruit ratings: Scout: Rivals: 247Sports: ESPN:				
Malik Vann; DE	Fairfield, Ohio	Fairfield High School	6 ft 3 in (1.91 m)	245 lb (111 kg)	Apr 18, 2017
Malik Vann; DE	Recruit ratings: Scout: Rivals: 247Sports: ESPN:				
Ja'Von Hicks; S	Cincinnati, Ohio	Colerain High School	6 ft 2 in (1.88 m)	185 lb (84 kg)	Apr 23, 2017
Ja'Von Hicks; S	Recruit ratings: Scout: Rivals: 247Sports: ESPN:				
Jayshon Jackson; WR	Chicago, Illinois	Simeon Career Academy	5 ft 10 in (1.78 m)	165 lb (75 kg)	May 26, 2017
Jayshon Jackson; WR	Recruit ratings: Scout: Rivals: 247Sports: ESPN:				
Arquon Bush; CB	Euclid, Ohio	Euclid High School	5 ft 11 in (1.80 m)	167 lb (76 kg)	Jun 19, 2017
Arquon Bush; CB	Recruit ratings: Scout: Rivals: 247Sports: ESPN:				
Taj Ward; CB	Solon, Ohio	Solon High School	6 ft 0 in (1.83 m)	170 lb (77 kg)	Jun 19, 2017
Taj Ward; CB	Recruit ratings: Scout: Rivals: 247Sports: ESPN:				
Jeremy Cooper; OG	Chicago, Illinois	Mount Carmel High School	6 ft 3 in (1.91 m)	295 lb (134 kg)	Jun 26, 2017
Jeremy Cooper; OG	Recruit ratings: Scout: Rivals: 247Sports: ESPN:				
Ben Bryant; QB	LaGrange, Illinois	Lyons Township High School	6 ft 3 in (1.91 m)	190 lb (86 kg)	Jun 27, 2017
Ben Bryant; QB	Recruit ratings: Scout: Rivals: 247Sports: ESPN:				
Darnell Shields; S	Cleveland, Ohio	St. Edward High School	6 ft 0 in (1.83 m)	180 lb (82 kg)	Jun 27, 2017
Darnell Shields; S	Recruit ratings: Scout: Rivals: 247Sports: ESPN:				
Yanez Rogers; WR	Pompano Beach, Florida	Blanche Ely High School	6 ft 2 in (1.88 m)	179 lb (81 kg)	Jun 27, 2017
Yanez Rogers; WR	Recruit ratings: Scout: Rivals: 247Sports: ESPN:				
Daeshon Martin; DE	Akron, Ohio	Archbishop Hoban High School	6 ft 3 in (1.91 m)	240 lb (110 kg)	Jul 25, 2017
Daeshon Martin; DE	Recruit ratings: Scout: Rivals: 247Sports: ESPN:				
Charles McClelland; RB	Homerville, Georgia	Clinch County High School	5 ft 11 in (1.80 m)	180 lb (82 kg)	Aug 5, 2017
Charles McClelland; RB	Recruit ratings: Scout: Rivals: 247Sports: ESPN:				
Ryan Montgomery; RB	Franklin, Ohio	Franklin High School	5 ft 11 in (1.80 m)	190 lb (86 kg)	Oct 4, 2017
Ryan Montgomery; RB	Recruit ratings: Scout: Rivals: 247Sports: ESPN:				
Dylan O'Quinn; TE	Millbury, Ohio	Lake High School	6 ft 5 in (1.96 m)	255 lb (116 kg)	Oct 8, 2017
Dylan O'Quinn; TE	Recruit ratings: Scout: Rivals: 247Sports: ESPN:				
Alec Pierce; WR	Glen Ellyn, Illinois	Glenbard West High School	6 ft 3 in (1.91 m)	196 lb (89 kg)	Dec 11, 2017
Alec Pierce; WR	Recruit ratings: Scout: Rivals: 247Sports: ESPN:				
Lorenz Metz; OT	Kirchdorf am Inn, Germany	Kirchdorf Wildcats	6 ft 9 in (2.06 m)	280 lb (130 kg)	Dec 20, 2017
Lorenz Metz; OT	Recruit ratings: Scout: Rivals: 247Sports: ESPN:				
Meechi Harris; WR	Xenia, Ohio	Xenia High School	6 ft 2 in (1.88 m)	188 lb (85 kg)	Dec 20, 2017
Meechi Harris; WR	Recruit ratings: Scout: Rivals: 247Sports: ESPN:				
Myjai Sanders; DE	Jacksonville, Florida	Raines High School	6 ft 4 in (1.93 m)	223 lb (101 kg)	Jan 22, 2018
Myjai Sanders; DE	Recruit ratings: Scout: Rivals: 247Sports: ESPN:				
Leonard Taylor; TE	Springfield, Ohio	Springfield High School	6 ft 5 in (1.96 m)	240 lb (110 kg)	Feb 7, 2018
Leonard Taylor; TE	Recruit ratings: Scout: Rivals: 247Sports: ESPN:				
Tavion Thomas; RB	Dayton, Ohio	Dunbar High School	6 ft 2 in (1.88 m)	225 lb (102 kg)	Feb 7, 2018
Tavion Thomas; RB	Recruit ratings: Scout: Rivals: 247Sports: ESPN:				
Overall recruit ranking:
Note: In many cases, Scout, Rivals, 247Sports, On3, and ESPN may conflict in their listings of height and weight.; In these cases, the average was taken. ESPN grades are on a 100-point scale.; Sources: "2018 Team Ranking". Rivals.com.

=== Incoming transfers ===
Cincinnati added five transfers to the 2018 roster.

Name	Pos.	Height	Weight	Year	Hometown	Prev. School
Dino Boyd	OT	6'4"	300	Senior	Newark, NJ	Rhode Island
Darius Harper	OT	6'7"	325	Sophomore	Springfield, OH	Miami (OH)
Aulden Knight	WR	5'9"	162	Sophomore	Akron, OH	Hampton
Tinashe Bere	LB	6'1"	235	Senior	Cincinnati, OH	Duke
Cam Jefferies	CB	5'10"	188	Junior	Painesville, OH	Bowling Green

== Preseason ==
=== Award watch lists ===
Listed in the order that they were released

Award	Player	Position	Year
Nagurski Trophy	Marquise Copeland	DT	SR
Outland Trophy	Marquise Copeland	DT	SR
Wuerffel Trophy	Garrett Campbell	OL	SR
Johnny Unitas Golden Arm Award	Hayden Moore	QB	SR

=== AAC media poll ===
The AAC media poll was released on July 24, 2018, with the Bearcats predicted to finish fourth in the AAC East Division.

Media poll (East)
Predicted finish	Team	Votes (1st place)
1	UCF	175 (25)
2	USF	140 (5)
3	Temple	132
4	Cincinnati	91
5	UConn	51
6	East Carolina	41

== Schedule ==
The Bearcats' 2018 schedule would consist of six home games and six away games. Cincinnati would host two of its four non-conference games; against Alabama A&M from the Southwestern Athletic Conference, and Ohio from the Mid-American Conference. They would take on long time rival Miami (OH) for their annual Victory Bell game at Paul Brown Stadium. They would travel to UCLA for the first ever meeting between the Bearcats and Bruins.

The Bearcats would play eight conference games; hosting East Carolina, Navy, South Florida and Tulane. They would travel to UCF, UConn, SMU, and Temple.

Date	Time	Opponent	Rank	Site	TV	Result	Attendance
September 1	7:00 p.m.	at UCLA*		Rose Bowl; Pasadena, CA	ESPN	W 26–17	54,116
September 8	8:00 p.m.	vs. Miami (OH)*		Paul Brown Stadium; Cincinnati, OH (Victory Bell)	ESPN3/FOX 19	W 21–0	16,062
September 15	7:00 p.m.	Alabama A&M*		Nippert Stadium; Cincinnati, OH	ESPN3	W 63–7	28,834
September 22	12:00 p.m.	Ohio*		Nippert Stadium; Cincinnati, OH	ESPNU	W 34–30	35,220
September 29	3:30 p.m.	at UConn		Rentschler Field; East Hartford, CT	CBSSN	W 49–7	20,322
October 6	12:00 p.m.	Tulane^{†}		Nippert Stadium; Cincinnati, OH	ESPNU	W 37–21	32,200
October 20	12:00 p.m.	at Temple	No. 20	Lincoln Financial Field; Philadelphia, PA	ESPNU	L 17–24 ^{OT}	33,026
October 27	3:30 p.m.	at SMU		Gerald J. Ford Stadium; University Park, TX	CBSSN	W 26–20 ^{OT}	16,121
November 3	3:30 p.m.	Navy		Nippert Stadium; Cincinnati, OH	ESPNU	W 42–0	36,318
November 10	7:00 p.m.	South Florida		Nippert Stadium; Cincinnati, OH	ESPNU	W 35–23	29,310
November 17	8:00 p.m.	at No. 11 UCF	No. 24	Spectrum Stadium; Orlando, FL (rivalry, College GameDay)	ABC	L 13–38	47,795
November 23	3:30 p.m.	East Carolina		Nippert Stadium; Cincinnati, OH	CBSSN	W 56–6	21,230
December 31	12:00 p.m.	vs. Virginia Tech*		Navy–Marine Corps Memorial Stadium; Annapolis, MD (Military Bowl)	ESPN	W 35–31	32,832
*Non-conference game; ^{†}Homecoming; Rankings from AP Poll (and CFP Rankings, after October 30) - Released prior to game; All times are in Eastern time

== Game summaries ==
=== at UCLA ===
	1	2	3	4	Total
Bearcats	0	17	0	9	26
Bruins	10	0	7	0	17

Expected to be an easy warmup opponent in the UCLA debut of Chip Kelly, the Bearcats were rude guests stunning the double digit favorite Bruins in the Rose Bowl. Michael Warren II rushed for 141 yards and 3 touchdowns, as the Bearcats rallied from an early 10–0 deficit to win. The Bearcats clinching touchdown came after the Bruins were called for a penalty during a Bearcats field goal attempt leading 19–17. Bearcats head coach Luke Fickell boldly gambled that the Bearcats could convert a 4th and 1 deep in Bruins territory and accepted the penalty, which took the field goal off the board. The Bearcats converted the 4th down and Warren scored a touchdown a few plays later to ice the game.

=== Vs. Miami (OH) ===
	1	2	3	4	Total
Bearcats	7	0	0	14	21
RedHawks	0	0	0	0	0

Played in a steady downpour, the Bearcats ground out a 21–0 win over the RedHawks to retain possession of the Victory Bell for the 13th straight season. This was the Bearcats' first shutout since blanking the Redhawks in 2013. Utilizing a ground attack, the Bearcats were led by redshirt freshman Desmond Ridder who had 117 yards rushing, and Michael Warren II with 94 yards rushing and 2 touchdowns. Though the game was played in soggy conditions, there was only one turnover committed by both teams combined. The game was played at Paul Brown Stadium in front of only 16,089 fans.

=== Alabama A&M ===
	1	2	3	4	Total
Bulldogs	0	0	7	0	7
Bearcats	28	14	14	7	63

In their home opener, The Bearcats scored on their first six possessions, led by Desmond Ridder's 9 for 10 passing and 3 touchdowns in the first quarter (the only quarter he played) as the Bearcats throttled the 1-AA Bulldogs. The Bearcats scored 49 points before the visitors from Huntsville could get a score.

=== Ohio ===
	1	2	3	4	Total
Bobcats	14	10	3	3	30
Bearcats	0	7	14	13	34

The Bearcats rallied from a 7–24 deficit to defeat the Bobcats. James Wiggins' goal-line interception in the 4th quarter snuffed out a late Bobcat drive and sealed the win.

=== at UConn ===
	1	2	3	4	Total
Bearcats	7	14	21	7	49
Huskies	7	0	0	0	7

The Bearcats spotted the Huskies an opening touchdown then ripped off 49 unanswered points to win their conference opener. Desmond Ridder threw for 270 yards, two touchdowns and ran for another score as the Bearcats rolled up 659 yards on offense.

=== Tulane ===
	1	2	3	4	Total
Green Wave	7	7	0	7	21
Bearcats	3	21	6	7	37

Michael Warren rushed for 123 yards including a career long 81 yarder for a touchdown that gave the Bearcats the lead for good, and it was a happy Homecoming as the Bearcats improved to 2–0 in conference. The Bearcats broke the game open by scoring 27 straight points between the 2nd and 4th quarters. With the win, the Bearcats not only stayed unbeaten, they also became Bowl-eligible for the first time since 2015.

=== at Temple ===
	1	2	3	4	OT	Total
No. 20 Bearcats	7	3	7	0	0	17
Owls	10	0	0	7	7	24

Ranked in the regular season for the first time since 2013, the Bearcats were now in the role of the hunted and it did not suit them well, as numerous late gaffes by the Bearcats allowed the Owls to rally from a 17-10 4th quarter deficit to win 24–17 in overtime. The Owls scored first in the extra session and Bearcats quarterback Desmond Ridder was intercepted to end the game. The loss was Cincinnati's third straight to Temple.

=== at SMU ===
	1	2	3	4	OT	Total
Bearcats	7	0	10	3	6	26
Mustangs	7	0	7	6	0	20

The Bearcats bounced back from their first loss to win a taut game in Dallas. Again the Bearcats raced out to a lead and again let the opponent rally back. The Bearcats were staked to a 17–7 lead in the third quarter from a pair of 32 yard Ridder to Kahlil Lewis touchdown passes and a Cole Smith field goal. The Mustangs rallied with 13 unanswered points in the third and fourth quarters to take a 20–17 lead. Smith's second field goal with no time left in regulation forced overtime. SMU had first possession in overtime when SMU quarterback Ben Hicks was intercepted by James Wiggins who returned the stolen pass 86 yards for a touchdown to give the Bearcats a walk-off win. Desmond Ridder threw for 352 yards and 2 touchdowns. The win avenged the homecoming loss to SMU from the previous season, ruining the Mustangs' homecoming in kind. The win moved the Bearcats to 7–1, their best start since the 2011 team also started 7–1.

=== Navy ===
	1	2	3	4	Total
Midshipmen	0	0	0	0	0
Bearcats	7	21	7	7	42

Cincinnati's previous meeting with Navy was a 42–32 loss, as the Bearcats could not slow much less stop the Midshipmen's triple option. This meeting, Navy's first ever in Cincinnati, the Bearcats were determined not to let the scenario repeat. Holding the Middies to 57 first half yards (all rushing) the Bearcats got a pair of touchdowns from Michael Warren II to go with a pair of touchdowns from Desmond Ridder (1 rush, 1 pass) as the Bearcats thrashed Navy 42–0, the Bearcats' second shutout of the season. The win moved the Bearcats to 8-1 their best start since 2009.

=== South Florida ===
	1	2	3	4	Total
Bulls	9	7	7	0	23
No. 25 Bearcats	7	7	21	0	35

The Bearcats returned to nationally ranked status at 25 and this time did not squander its ranking. Michael Warren II scored 4 TDs as the Bearcats broke open a tight game in the third quarter and pulled away to a 35–23 win over South Florida. The Bearcats were trailing 16–14 in the third when Warren broke loose for a 57-yard touchdown run, his second of the day after catching a touchdown pass from Desmond Ridder. Warren would add two more scores in the third quarter and finish with 151 rushing yards. The win moved Cincinnati to 9-1 and set up a showdown with defending conference champ University of Central Florida. It was announced shortly after the game that the matchup with UCF the upcoming Saturday would not only be nationally televised as the College Football Saturday Night Game of the Week on ABC, but also be the focus of the ESPN College Gameday.

=== at UCF ===
	1	2	3	4	Total
No. 19 Bearcats	6	0	0	7	13
No. 11 Knights	7	14	7	10	38

With its highest regular season ranking (19) in seven years, the Bearcats traveled to Orlando to face unbeaten and 11th ranked UCF. In front a rowdy Spectrum Stadium crowd and a nationally televised audience, the Bearcats started strong. A Kimoni Fitz strip-sack/fumble in the end zone gave the Bearcats a 6–0 lead and quieted the UCF crowd, but Cole Smith missed the extra point and the Knights promptly raced back down the field to take the lead on McKenzie Milton's short run. The Knights were never headed again, scoring 35 straight points and rolling to a 38–13 win. The Bearcat offense never got on track and the Knights clinched the AAC Eastern Division title.

=== East Carolina ===
	1	2	3	4	Total
Pirates	0	6	0	0	6
Bearcats	21	21	7	7	56

Desmond Ridder threw for 335 yards and four touchdowns in the first half as the Bearcats steamrolled the Pirates on Senior Day 56–6. Khalil Lewis finished with a career high 202 yards on 9 catches and 3 touchdowns. With top running back Michael Warren sidelined with a shoulder injury, Charles McClelland filled in capably with 114 yards rushing which included a 55-yard touchdown run in the second quarter. The Bearcats scored the game's first 35 points and were never threatened. The defense got in on the scoring as well with Arquon Bush intercepting a fourth quarter pass and taking the stolen loaf 36 yards back for the game's final score. The 56 points marked the fourth time this season the Bearcats topped 40 points in a game. The Bearcats honored 14 seniors, who were sent out with a home finale win before a Thanksgiving Friday afternoon crowd. With this win, Cincinnati completed its first unbeaten home schedule since 2009, and its first double-digit win season since 2012. The 10 wins before the bowl game was the most since the 2009 team completed an unbeaten 12–0 season. The Bearcats accepted a bid from the Military Bowl against Virginia Tech, their first bowl bid since the 2015 season and looked to claim their first bowl win since the 2012 Belk Bowl.

=== Vs. Virginia Tech (Military Bowl) ===
	1	2	3	4	Total
Bearcats	7	7	7	14	35
Hokies	7	7	10	7	31

The Bearcats won their first bowl game since the 2012 Belk Bowl and avenged a previous Military Bowl loss to the Hokies with a thrilling win. Michael Warren's 8 yard touchdown run in the fourth quarter proved to be the winning score. The game was not sealed until James Wiggins' acrobatic interception at his own 30 late in the fourth quarter. The University of Cincinnati Bearcats completed their best season since 2011 and finished in the national rankings 23rd in the Coaches poll and 24th in the AP Poll.

== Personnel ==
=== Roster and staff ===
2018 Cincinnati Bearcats football team roster
Players
Coaches
Offense

Pos.	#	Name	Class
WR	1	Kahlil Lewis	Sr
RB	3	Michael Warren II	So
RB	5	Tavion Thomas	Fr
QB	6	Ben Bryant	Fr
WR	7	Javan Hawes	So
QB	8	Hayden Moore	Sr
QB	9	Desmond Ridder	Fr
RB	10	Charles McClelland	Fr
QB	10	Jake Sopko	So
TE	11	Leonard Taylor	Fr
WR	12	Alec Pierce	Fr
WR	13	Trent Cloud	Fr
WR	14	Yanez Rogers	Fr
RB	15	Taylor Boose	Jr
QB	16	John Keller	Fr
WR	17	Rashad Medaris	Jr
WR	18	Meechi Harris	Fr
WR	19	Tyrin Summers	So
WR	20	Aulden Knight	So
WR	21	Jayshon Jackson	Fr
RB	23	Gerrid Doaks	So
WR	25	Casey Kirk	Fr
WR	26	Jerron Rollins	Jr
RB	29	Alex Dowds	Fr
RB	30	Michael Kopaygorodsky	Fr
RB	41	Colin Thurman	Fr
TE	44	Mick Oakes	Fr
OL	50	Dylan O'Quinn	Fr
OL	51	Lorenz Metz	Fr
OL	53	Tyler McGarr	Jr
OL	54	Keith Minor	Sr
OL	55	Alex Heil	Jr
OL	56	Kyle Trout	Sr
OL	58	Darius Harper	So
OL	59	Colin Truett	Fr
OL	60	Zach Bycznski	So
OL	62	Mason Garrison	Jr
OL	65	Cody Lamb	Fr
OL	66	Ethan Voelker	Fr
OL	68	Doug Bates	So
OL	70	Jakari Robinson	Fr
OL	71	Colin Woodside	Fr
OL	72	Garrett Campbell	Sr
OL	73	Blake Yager	Jr
OL	74	Jeremy Cooper	Fr
OL	75	Chris Ferguson	Sr
OL	76	Dino Boyd	Sr
OL	77	Vincent McConnell	Fr
OL	78	Morgan James	Jr
OL	79	Drew Hartmann	Fr
WR	80	Malick Mbodj	So
TE	81	Josh Whyle	Fr
TE	82	Wilson Huber	Fr
TE	83	Josiah Deguara	Jr
WR	84	Wyatt Fischer	Fr
WR	85	Thomas Geddis	Jr
WR	86	Jack Peterson	Fr
TE	87	Bruno Labelle	So
WR	88	Braxton Neal	Jr
WR	89	Jake Peterson	Fr

Defense

Pos.	#	Name	Class
CB	2	Tyrell Gilbert	Sr
S	3	Ja'von Hicks	Fr
LB	4	Malik Clements	Sr
LB	6	Perry Young	Jr
CB	7	Coby Bryant	So
LB	8	Jarell White	So
CB	9	Arquon Bush	Fr
CB	10	Christian Angulo	Jr
LB	11	Bryan Wright	Jr
CB	12	TJ Johnson	So
LB	13	Ty Van Fossen	Fr
CB	14	Cameron Jeffries	Jr
CB	15	Taj Ward	Fr
S	16	Darrick Forrest	So
CB	18	Josiah Robey	Fr
DE	19	Ethan Tucky	So
DE	21	Myjai Sanders	Fr
S	22	Collin Widecan	So
LB	23	RJ Potts	Fr
CB	24	Noah Hamlin	Fr
S	27	Will Adams	Fr
S	30	Chris Murphy	Sr
CB	31	Marquis Smith	So
S	32	James Wiggins	So
DE	33	Blake Bacevich	Fr
LB	34	Kyle Bolden	Fr
LB	35	Ryan Royer	Fr
CB	38	Jake Tewart	Fr
LB	40	Ty Sponseller	So
LB	41	Joel Dublanko	So
DE	42	Malik Vann	Fr
DE	43	Michael Pitts	So
DT	44	Marquise Copeland	Sr
LB	47	Nate Lawler	Fr
LB	48	Kevin Mouhon	Sr
DE	51	Kimoni Fitz	Sr
DL	52	Daeshon Martin	Fr
DE	86	Angelo Howze	Fr
DT	89	Nick Staderman	So
DT	90	Jabari Taylor	Fr
DT	92	Curtis Brooks	So
DT	93	Elijah Ponder	So
DT	94	Chase Brown	Fr
DT	95	Joe Schroer	Jr
DT	96	Cortez Broughton	Sr
DE	97	Zane Wilson	Fr
DE	98	Mychal Keys	Fr
DT	99	Marcus Brown	So

Special teams

Pos.	#	Name	Class
K	19	Cole Smith	Fr
P	37	James Smith	So
LS	57	Cory Armstrong	So
LS	59	Zach Wood	Jr
LS	74	Blake Bammann	Fr
K	97	Ryan Jones	Jr

Head coach

- Luke Fickell (Ohio State) – 2nd year

Coordinators/assistant coaches

- Mike Denbrock (Grand Valley State)
  2nd year – (Offensive Coordinator/ Tight Ends)
- Marcus Freeman (Ohio State)
  2nd year – (Defensive Coordinator/ Linebackers)
- Brian Mason (Denison)
  1st year – (Special Teams Coordinator)
- Ron Crook (West Liberty State)
  2nd year – (Offensive Line)
- Gino Guidugli (Cincinnati)
  2nd year – (Quarterbacks)
- Mike Mickens (Cincinnati)
  1st year – (Cornerbacks)
- Doug Phillips (Toledo)
  2nd year – (Running Backs)
- Joker Phillips (Kentucky)
  2nd year (4th overall) – (Wide Receivers)
- Steve Stripling (Colorado)
  4th year – (Defensive Line)
- Jon Tenuta (Virginia)
  2nd year – (Safeties)

Legend

- (C) Team captain
- (S) Suspended
- (I) Ineligible
- Injured
- Redshirt

Roster

=== Depth chart ===
Defense

FS
James Wiggins
Chris Murphy
⋅

WLB	MLB	SLB
Perry Young	Bryan Wright	Malik Clements
⋅	Joel Dublanko	Jarell White
⋅	⋅	⋅

SS
Darrick Forrest
Ja'von Hicks
⋅

CB
Tyrell Gilbert
Noah Hamlin
Christian Angulo

DE	DT	DT	DE
Kimoni Fitz	Marquise Copeland	Cortez Broughton	Michael Pitts
Malik Vann	Markus Brown	Curtis Brooks	Ethan Tucky
⋅	⋅	⋅	⋅

CB
Coby Bryant
Cameron Jeffries
Arquon Bush

Offense

WR
Kahlil Lewis
Trent Cloud
Malick Mbodj

WR
Thomas Geddis
Javon Hawes
Alec Pierce

LT	LG	C	RG	RT
Dino Boyd	Kyle Trout	Garrett Campbell	Morgan James	Chris Ferguson
Vincent McConnell	Zach Bycznski	Jakari Robinson	Jeremy Cooper	Blake Yager
⋅	⋅	⋅	⋅	⋅

TE
Josiah Deguara
Bruno Labelle
Wilson Huber

WR
Rashad Medaris
Jerron Rollins
Jayshon Jackson

QB
Desmond Ridder
Hayden Moore
Ben Bryant

RB
Michael Warren II
Gerrid Doaks
Charles McClelland

== Rankings ==
Ranking movements Legend: ██ Increase in ranking ██ Decrease in ranking — = Not ranked RV = Received votes
	Week															
Poll	Pre	1	2	3	4	5	6	7	8	9	10	11	12	13	14	Final
AP	—	—	—	—	RV	RV	25	20	RV	RV	25	19	RV	RV	RV	24
Coaches	—	—	RV	RV	RV	RV	25	21	RV	RV	23	20	RV	RV	RV	23
CFP	Not released									—	—	24	—	—	—	Not released

== Awards and milestones ==
Weekly Awards
Player	Award	Date Awarded	Ref.
Bryan Wright	Co-Defensive Player of the Week	September 3, 2018	
James Wiggins	Defensive Player of the Week	October 29, 2018	
Cole Smith	Special Teams Player of the Week	October 29, 2018	
Cortez Broughton	Defensive Player of the Week	October 29, 2018	
Arquon Bush	Defensive Player of the Week	November 26, 2018	

Individual Awards
Award	Recipient	Ref.
AAC Rookie of the Year	Desmond Ridder	
AAC Coach of the Year	Luke Fickell	
Ray Guy Award (finalist)	James Smith	

All-American
Player	AP	AFCA	FWAA	TSN	WCFF
James Smith	2		2		
The NCAA recognizes a selection to all five of the AP, AFCA, FWAA, TSN and WCFF first teams for unanimous selections and three of five for consensus selections.

All-AAC
Player	Position	Team
Dino Boyd	OT	1
Cortez Broughton	DT	1
Perry Young	LB	1
James Smith	P	1
Garrett Campbell	C	2
Josiah Deguara	TE	2
Michael Warren II	RB	2
Marquise Copeland	DT	2
Kimoni Fitz	DE	2
James Wiggins	S	2

== 2019 NFL draft ==
The following Bearcat player was selected in the 2019 NFL draft.

Rnd.	Pick No.	NFL team	Player	Pos.	College	Conf.	Notes
7	242	Los Angeles Chargers	Cortez Broughton	DT	Cincinnati	The American	
