= 2018–19 NCAA football bowl games =

Series of college football bowl games following the 2018 season

- Season: 2018
- Regular season: August 25, 2018 – December 8, 2018
- Number of bowls: 41 (Note: 40 FBS bowl games, including the College Football Playoff National Championship Game, and 1 FCS bowl game.)
- All-star games: 4
- Bowl games: December 15, 2018 – January 7, 2019 (Note: Dates exclude all-star games.)
- National Championship: 2019 College Football Playoff; National Championship
- Location of Championship: Levi's Stadium; Santa Clara, CA
- Champions: Clemson Tigers
- Bowl Challenge Cup winner: Conference USA
Bowl record by conference
Conference	Bowls	Record	Number of teams in final AP poll
ACC	12 (11)	6–5 (0.545)	2
SEC	12	6–6 (0.500)	6
Big Ten	9	5–4 (0.556)	5
Big 12	7	4–3 (0.571)	3
Pac-12	7	3–4 (0.429)	2
AAC	7	2–5 (0.286)	2
Conference USA	6	4–2 (0.667)	0
Mountain West	6 (5)	3–2 (0.600)	3
MAC	6	1–5 (0.167)	0
Sun Belt	5	3–2 (0.600)	0
Independents	3	2–1 (0.667)	2
- Note: The ACC versus Mountain West First Responder Bowl was a no-contest due to lightning.

The 2018–19 NCAA football bowl games were a series of college football bowl games completing the 2018 NCAA Division I FBS football season. The games began on December 15, 2018, and, aside from the all-star games that follow, ended with the 2019 College Football Playoff National Championship, which was played on January 7, 2019.

The total of 40 team-competitive bowls in FBS, including the national championship game, was unchanged from the previous year. To fill the 78 available bowl slots, a total of 10 teams (13% of all participants) with non-winning records (6–6) were invited to bowl games. This was the second consecutive year, and only the third time in eight years, that no teams with losing seasons (6–7 or 5–7) were invited to fill available bowl berths.

Only 39 of the 40 bowls were played, with the First Responder Bowl becoming the first ever postseason game at the FBS-level (or its predecessors) to be cancelled, as a severe lightning storm lingered for over two hours near the Cotton Bowl Stadium. The game was scored as a no-contest for the teams involved.

The three all-star games were the East–West Shrine Game and NFLPA Collegiate Bowl, played on January 19, and the Senior Bowl, played on January 26.

== Schedule ==
The schedule for the 2018–19 bowl games is below. All times are EST (UTC−5).

=== College Football Playoff and Championship Game ===
The College Football Playoff system is used to determine a national championship of Division I FBS college football. A 13-member committee of experts ranked the top 25 teams in the nation after each of the last seven weeks. The top four teams in the final ranking play in a single-elimination semifinal round, with the winners advancing to the National Championship game.

The semifinal games for the 2018–19 season were the Cotton Bowl and the Orange Bowl. Both were played on December 29 as part of a yearly rotation of three pairs of six bowls, commonly referred to as the New Year's Six bowl games. The winners advanced to the 2019 College Football Playoff National Championship at Levi's Stadium in Santa Clara, California, on January 7.

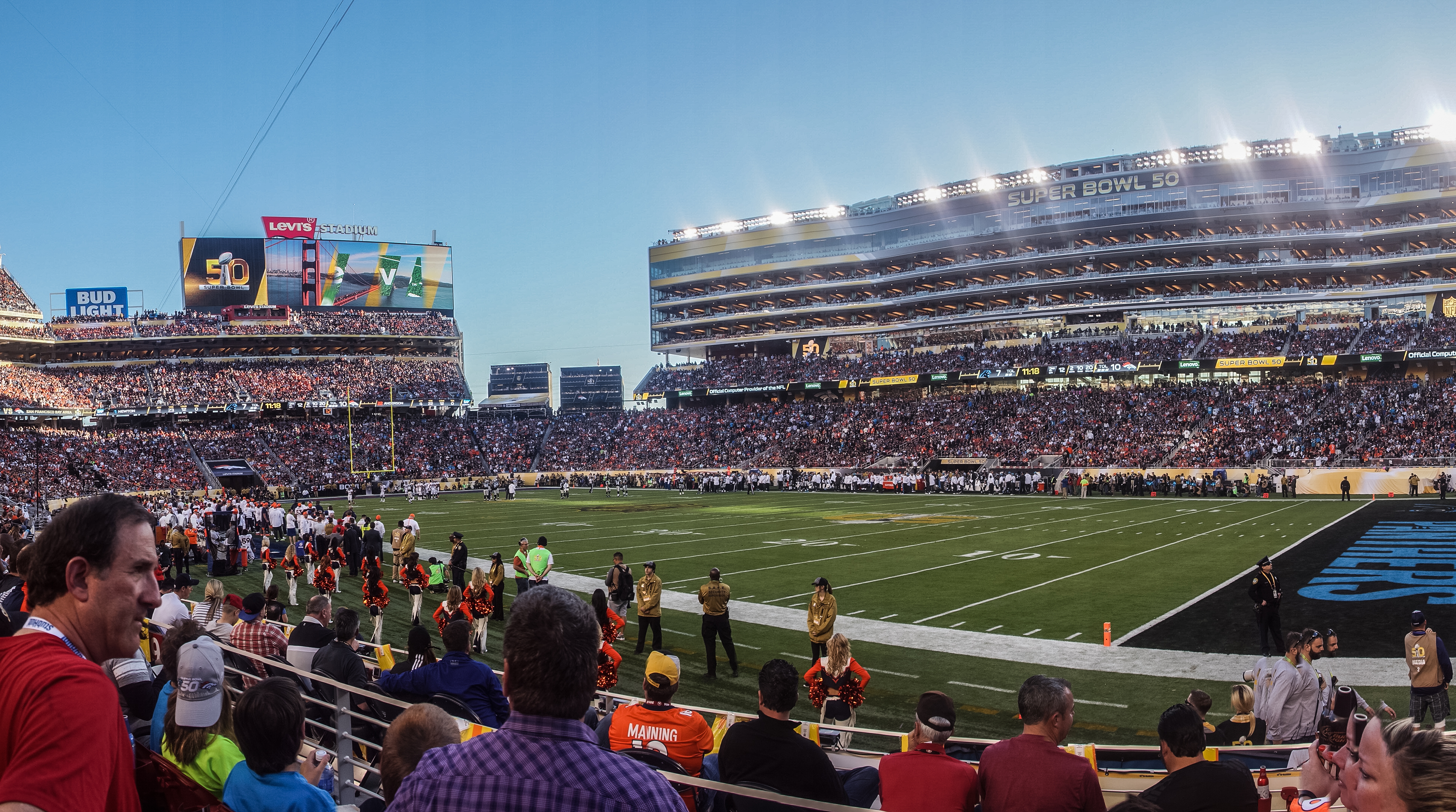
Levi's Stadium, site of the National Championship game

Semifinals
December 29 – Orange Bowl Hard Rock Stadium, Miami Gardens
1	Alabama	45
4	Oklahoma	34
December 29 – Cotton Bowl AT&T Stadium, Arlington
2	Clemson	30
3	Notre Dame	3

Championship
January 7 – National Championship Levi's Stadium, Santa Clara
1	Alabama	16
2	Clemson	44

Each of the games in the following table was televised by ESPN.

Date	Time (EST)	Game	Site	Teams	Affiliations	Results
Dec. 29	12:00 p.m.	Peach Bowl	Mercedes-Benz Stadium; Atlanta, Georgia	No. 10 Florida Gators (9–3); No. 7 Michigan Wolverines (10–2)	SEC; Big Ten	Florida 41; Michigan 15
Dec. 29	4:00 p.m.	Cotton Bowl Classic (Playoff Semifinal Game)	AT&T Stadium; Arlington, Texas	No. 2 Clemson Tigers (13–0); No. 3 Notre Dame Fighting Irish (12–0)	ACC; Independent	Clemson 30; Notre Dame 3
Dec. 29	8:00 p.m.	Orange Bowl (Playoff Semifinal Game)	Hard Rock Stadium; Miami Gardens, Florida	No. 1 Alabama Crimson Tide (13–0); No. 4 Oklahoma Sooners (12–1)	SEC; Big 12	Alabama 45; Oklahoma 34
Jan. 1	1:00 p.m.	Fiesta Bowl	State Farm Stadium; Glendale, Arizona	No. 11 LSU Tigers (9–3); No. 8 UCF Knights (12–0)	SEC; American	LSU 40; UCF 32
Jan. 1	5:00 p.m.	Rose Bowl	Rose Bowl; Pasadena, California	No. 6 Ohio State Buckeyes (12–1); No. 9 Washington Huskies (10–3)	Big Ten; Pac-12	Ohio State 28; Washington 23
Jan. 1	8:45 p.m.	Sugar Bowl	Mercedes-Benz Superdome; New Orleans, Louisiana	No. 15 Texas Longhorns (9–4); No. 5 Georgia Bulldogs (11–2)	Big 12; SEC	Texas 28; Georgia 21
Jan. 7	8:00 p.m.	College Football Playoff National Championship (Cotton Bowl Winner vs. Orange Bowl Winner)	Levi's Stadium; Santa Clara, California	No. 2 Clemson Tigers (14–0); No. 1 Alabama Crimson Tide (14–0)	ACC; SEC	Clemson 44; Alabama 16

=== Non-CFP bowl games ===
For the 2018–19 bowl season, the Gasparilla Bowl was re-located from Tropicana Field to Raymond James Stadium (which already hosts the Outback Bowl). Under new sponsorship deals in comparison to the prior season's bowl games, the Cactus Bowl was renamed the Cheez-It Bowl, the Heart of Dallas Bowl was renamed the First Responder Bowl, and the Foster Farms Bowl was renamed the Redbox Bowl. The Gator Bowl name was reinstated for the first time since the 2013 season, as it had been known as the TaxSlayer Bowl for the four prior editions.

Date	Time (EST)	Game	Site	Television	Teams	Affiliations	Results
Dec. 15	1:30 p.m.	Cure Bowl	Camping World Stadium; Orlando, Florida	CBSSN	Tulane Green Wave (6–6); Louisiana Ragin' Cajuns (7–6)	American; Sun Belt	Tulane 41; Louisiana 24
Dec. 15	2:00 p.m.	New Mexico Bowl	Dreamstyle Stadium; Albuquerque, New Mexico	ESPN	Utah State Aggies (10–2); North Texas Mean Green (9–3)	MWC; C-USA	Utah State 52; North Texas 13
Dec. 15	3:30 p.m.	Las Vegas Bowl	Sam Boyd Stadium; Las Vegas, Nevada	ABC	No. 21 Fresno State Bulldogs (11–2); Arizona State Sun Devils (7–5)	MWC; Pac-12	Fresno State 31; Arizona State 20
Dec. 15	5:30 p.m.	Camellia Bowl	Cramton Bowl; Montgomery, Alabama	ESPN	Georgia Southern Eagles (9–3); Eastern Michigan Eagles (7–5)	Sun Belt; MAC	Georgia Southern 23; Eastern Michigan 21
Dec. 15	9:00 p.m.	New Orleans Bowl	Mercedes-Benz Superdome; New Orleans, Louisiana	ESPN	Appalachian State Mountaineers (10–2); Middle Tennessee Blue Raiders (8–5)	Sun Belt; C-USA	Appalachian State 45; Middle Tennessee 13
Dec. 18	7:00 p.m.	Boca Raton Bowl	FAU Stadium; Boca Raton, Florida	ESPN	UAB Blazers (10–3); Northern Illinois Huskies (8–5)	C-USA; MAC	UAB 37; Northern Illinois 13
Dec. 19	8:00 p.m.	Frisco Bowl	Toyota Stadium; Frisco, Texas	ESPN	Ohio Bobcats (8–4); San Diego State Aztecs (7–5)	MAC; MWC	Ohio 27; San Diego State 0
Dec. 20	8:00 p.m.	Gasparilla Bowl	Raymond James Stadium; Tampa, Florida	ESPN	Marshall Thundering Herd (8–4); South Florida Bulls (7–5)	C-USA; American	Marshall 38; South Florida 20
Dec. 21	12:30 p.m.	Bahamas Bowl	Thomas Robinson Stadium; Nassau, Bahamas	ESPN	FIU Panthers (8–4); Toledo Rockets (7–5)	C-USA; MAC	FIU 35; Toledo 32
Dec. 21	4:00 p.m.	Famous Idaho Potato Bowl	Albertsons Stadium; Boise, Idaho	ESPN	BYU Cougars (6–6); Western Michigan Broncos (7–5)	Independent; MAC	BYU 49; Western Michigan 18
Dec. 22	12:00 p.m.	Birmingham Bowl	Legion Field; Birmingham, Alabama	ESPN	Wake Forest Demon Deacons (6–6); Memphis Tigers (8–5)	ACC; American	Wake Forest 37; Memphis 34
Dec. 22	3:30 p.m.	Armed Forces Bowl	Amon G. Carter Stadium; Fort Worth, Texas	ESPN	Army Black Knights (10–2); Houston Cougars (8–4)	Independent; American	Army 70; Houston 14
Dec. 22	7:00 p.m.	Dollar General Bowl	Ladd–Peebles Stadium; Mobile, Alabama	ESPN	Troy Trojans (9–3); Buffalo Bulls (10–3)	Sun Belt; MAC	Troy 42; Buffalo 32
Dec. 22	10:30 p.m.	Hawaii Bowl	Aloha Stadium; Honolulu, Hawaii	ESPN	Louisiana Tech Bulldogs (7–5); Hawaii Rainbow Warriors (8–5)	C-USA; MWC	Louisiana Tech 31; Hawaii 14
Dec. 26	1:30 p.m.	First Responder Bowl	Cotton Bowl Stadium; Dallas, Texas	ESPN	Boston College Eagles (7–5); No. 25 Boise State Broncos (10–3)	ACC; MWC	No contest due to weather cancellation.
Dec. 26	5:15 p.m.	Quick Lane Bowl	Ford Field; Detroit, Michigan	ESPN	Minnesota Golden Gophers (6–6); Georgia Tech Yellow Jackets (7–5)	Big Ten; ACC	Minnesota 34; Georgia Tech 10
Dec. 26	9:00 p.m.	Cheez-It Bowl	Chase Field; Phoenix, Arizona	ESPN	TCU Horned Frogs (6–6); California Golden Bears (7–5)	Big 12; Pac-12	TCU 10; California 7 (OT)
Dec. 27	1:30 p.m.	Independence Bowl	Independence Stadium; Shreveport, Louisiana	ESPN	Duke Blue Devils (7–5); Temple Owls (8–4)	ACC; American	Duke 56; Temple 27
Dec. 27	5:15 p.m.	Pinstripe Bowl	Yankee Stadium; Bronx, New York	ESPN	Wisconsin Badgers (7–5); Miami (FL) Hurricanes (7–5)	Big Ten; ACC	Wisconsin 35; Miami (FL) 3
Dec. 27	9:00 p.m.	Texas Bowl	NRG Stadium; Houston, Texas	ESPN	Baylor Bears (6–6); Vanderbilt Commodores (6–6)	Big 12; SEC	Baylor 45; Vanderbilt 38
Dec. 28	1:30 p.m.	Music City Bowl	Nissan Stadium; Nashville, Tennessee	ESPN	Auburn Tigers (7–5); Purdue Boilermakers (6–6)	SEC; Big Ten	Auburn 63; Purdue 14
Dec. 28	5:15 p.m.	Camping World Bowl	Camping World Stadium; Orlando, Florida	ESPN	No. 20 Syracuse Orange (9–3); No. 16 West Virginia Mountaineers (8–3)	ACC; Big 12	Syracuse 34; West Virginia 18
Dec. 28	9:00 p.m.	Alamo Bowl	Alamodome; San Antonio, Texas	ESPN	No. 13 Washington State Cougars (10–2); No. 24 Iowa State Cyclones (8–4)	Pac-12; Big 12	Washington State 28; Iowa State 26
Dec. 29	12:00 p.m.	Belk Bowl	Bank of America Stadium; Charlotte, North Carolina	ABC	Virginia Cavaliers (7–5); South Carolina Gamecocks (7–5)	ACC; SEC	Virginia 28; South Carolina 0
Dec. 29	1:15 p.m.	Arizona Bowl	Arizona Stadium; Tucson, Arizona	CBSSN	Nevada Wolf Pack (7–5); Arkansas State Red Wolves (8–4)	MWC; Sun Belt	Nevada 16; Arkansas State 13 (OT)
Dec. 31	12:00 p.m.	Military Bowl	Navy–Marine Corps Memorial Stadium; Annapolis, Maryland	ESPN	Cincinnati Bearcats (10–2); Virginia Tech Hokies (6–6)	American; ACC	Cincinnati 35; Virginia Tech 31
Dec. 31	2:00 p.m.	Sun Bowl	Sun Bowl Stadium; El Paso, Texas	CBS	Stanford Cardinal (8–4); Pittsburgh Panthers (7–6)	Pac-12; ACC	Stanford 14; Pittsburgh 13
Dec. 31	3:00 p.m.	Redbox Bowl	Levi's Stadium; Santa Clara, California	Fox	Oregon Ducks (8–4); Michigan State Spartans (7–5)	Pac-12; Big Ten	Oregon 7 Michigan State 6
Dec. 31	3:45 p.m.	Liberty Bowl	Liberty Bowl Memorial Stadium; Memphis, Tennessee	ESPN	Oklahoma State Cowboys (6–6); No. 23 Missouri Tigers (8–4)	Big 12; SEC	Oklahoma State 38; Missouri 33
Dec. 31	7:00 p.m.	Holiday Bowl	SDCCU Stadium; San Diego, California	FS1	No. 22 Northwestern Wildcats (8–5); No. 17 Utah Utes (9–4)	Big Ten; Pac-12	Northwestern 31; Utah 20
Dec. 31	7:30 p.m.	Gator Bowl	TIAA Bank Field; Jacksonville, Florida	ESPN	No. 19 Texas A&M Aggies (8–4); NC State Wolfpack (9–3)	SEC; ACC	Texas A&M 52; NC State 13
Jan. 1	12:00 p.m.	Outback Bowl	Raymond James Stadium; Tampa, Florida	ESPN2	Iowa Hawkeyes (8–4); No. 18 Mississippi State Bulldogs (8–4)	Big Ten; SEC	Iowa 27; Mississippi State 22
Jan. 1	1:00 p.m.	Citrus Bowl	Camping World Stadium; Orlando, Florida	ABC	No. 14 Kentucky Wildcats (9–3); No. 12 Penn State Nittany Lions (9–3)	SEC; Big Ten	Kentucky 27; Penn State 24

=== FCS bowl game ===
The FCS has one bowl game; they also have a championship bracket that began on November 24 and ended on January 5.

Date	Time (EST)	Game	Site	Television	Participants	Affiliations	Results
Dec. 15	12:00 p.m.	Celebration Bowl	Mercedes-Benz Stadium; Atlanta, Georgia	ABC	North Carolina A&T Aggies (9–2); Alcorn State Braves (9–3)	MEAC; SWAC	North Carolina A&T 24; Alcorn State 22

=== All-star games ===
Date	Time (EST)	Game	Site	Television	Participants	Results
Jan. 13		Tropical Bowl	Daytona Stadium; Daytona Beach, Florida		American Team; National Team	American 24; National 16
Jan. 19	3:00 p.m.	East–West Shrine Game	Tropicana Field; St. Petersburg, Florida	NFL Network	West Team; East Team	West 21; East 17
Jan. 19	5:00 p.m.	NFLPA Collegiate Bowl	Rose Bowl; Pasadena, California	FS1	American Team; National Team	American 10; National 7
Jan. 26	2:30 p.m.	Senior Bowl	Ladd–Peebles Stadium; Mobile, Alabama	NFL Network	North Team; South Team	North 34; South 24

== Team selections ==
Generally, a team must have at least six wins to be considered bowl eligible. The College Football Playoff semi-final games are determined based on the top four seeds in the playoff committee's final rankings. The remainder of the bowl eligible teams are selected by each respective bowl based on conference tie-ins, order of selection, match-up considerations, and other factors.

=== CFP top 25 standings and bowl games ===
On December 2, 2018, the College Football Playoff selection committee announced their final team rankings for the season.

Three of the four semifinalists – Alabama, Clemson, and Oklahoma – had also been semifinalists the previous season.

Rank	Team	W–L	Conference and standing	Bowl game
1	Alabama Crimson Tide	13–0	SEC champions	Orange Bowl (CFP semifinal)
2	Clemson Tigers	13–0	ACC champions	Cotton Bowl (CFP semifinal)
3	Notre Dame Fighting Irish	12–0	Independent	Cotton Bowl (CFP semifinal)
4	Oklahoma Sooners	12–1	Big 12 champions	Orange Bowl (CFP semifinal)
5	Georgia Bulldogs	11–2	SEC East Division champions	Sugar Bowl (NY6)
6	Ohio State Buckeyes	12–1	Big Ten champions	Rose Bowl (NY6)
7	Michigan Wolverines	10–2	Big Ten East Division co-champions	Peach Bowl (NY6)
8	UCF Knights	12–0	AAC champions	Fiesta Bowl (NY6)
9	Washington Huskies	10–3	Pac-12 champions	Rose Bowl (NY6)
10	Florida Gators	9–3	SEC East Division second place (tie)	Peach Bowl (NY6)
11	LSU Tigers	9–3	SEC West Division second place (tie)	Fiesta Bowl (NY6)
12	Penn State Nittany Lions	9–3	Big Ten East Division third place	Citrus Bowl
13	Washington State Cougars	10–2	Pac-12 North Division co-champions	Alamo Bowl
14	Kentucky Wildcats	9–3	SEC East Division second place (tie)	Citrus Bowl
15	Texas Longhorns	9–4	Big 12 second place	Sugar Bowl (NY6)
16	West Virginia Mountaineers	8–3	Big 12 third place (tie)	Camping World Bowl
17	Utah Utes	9–4	Pac-12 South Division champions	Holiday Bowl
18	Mississippi State Bulldogs	8–4	SEC West Division fourth place	Outback Bowl
19	Texas A&M Aggies	8–4	SEC West Division second place (tie)	Gator Bowl
20	Syracuse Orange	9–3	ACC Atlantic Division second place	Camping World Bowl
21	Fresno State Bulldogs	11–2	Mountain West champions	Las Vegas Bowl
22	Northwestern Wildcats	8–5	Big Ten West Division champions	Holiday Bowl
23	Missouri Tigers	8–4	SEC East Division fourth place (tie)	Liberty Bowl
24	Iowa State Cyclones	8–4	Big 12 third place (tie)	Alamo Bowl
25	Boise State Broncos	10–3	MWC West Division champions	First Responder Bowl

=== Conference champions' bowl games ===
Three bowls will feature two conference champions playing against each other—the Boca Raton Bowl, Orange Bowl, and Rose Bowl. Rankings are per the above CFP standings.

Conference	Champion	W–L	Rank	Bowl game
ACC	Clemson Tigers	13–0	2	Cotton Bowl
American	UCF Knights	12–0	8	Fiesta Bowl
Big Ten	Ohio State Buckeyes	12–1	6	Rose Bowl
Big 12	Oklahoma Sooners	12–1	4	Orange Bowl
C-USA	UAB Blazers	10–3	—	Boca Raton Bowl
MAC	Northern Illinois Huskies	8–5	—	Boca Raton Bowl
Mountain West	Fresno State Bulldogs	11–2	21	Las Vegas Bowl
Pac-12	Washington Huskies	10–3	9	Rose Bowl
SEC	Alabama Crimson Tide	13–0	1	Orange Bowl
Sun Belt	Appalachian State Mountaineers	10–2	—	New Orleans Bowl

=== Bowl–eligible teams ===
- ACC (11): Boston College, Clemson, Duke, Georgia Tech, Miami (FL), NC State, Pittsburgh, Syracuse, Virginia, Virginia Tech, Wake Forest
- American (7): Cincinnati, Houston, Memphis, South Florida, Temple, Tulane, UCF
- Big Ten (9): Iowa, Michigan, Michigan State, Minnesota, Northwestern, Ohio State, Penn State, Purdue, Wisconsin
- Big 12 (7): Baylor, Iowa State, Oklahoma, Oklahoma State, TCU, Texas, West Virginia
- C-USA (7): FIU, Louisiana Tech, Marshall, Middle Tennessee, North Texas, Southern Miss, UAB
- MAC (7): Buffalo, Eastern Michigan, Miami (OH), Northern Illinois, Ohio, Toledo, Western Michigan
- Mountain West (7): Boise State, Fresno State, Hawaii, Nevada, San Diego State, Utah State, Wyoming
- Pac-12 (7): Arizona State, California, Oregon, Stanford, Utah, Washington, Washington State
- SEC (11): Alabama, Auburn, Florida, Georgia, Kentucky, LSU, Mississippi State, Missouri, South Carolina, Texas A&M, Vanderbilt
- Sun Belt (6): Appalachian State, Arkansas State, Georgia Southern, Louisiana, Louisiana–Monroe, Troy
- Independent (3): Army, BYU, Notre Dame

Number of bowl berths available: 78
Number of bowl-eligible teams: 82

=== Bowl-eligible teams that did not receive a berth ===
As there were more bowl-eligible teams than berths available, four teams that were bowl-eligible did not receive an invitation.

- Louisiana–Monroe (6–6)
- Miami (OH) (6–6)
- Southern Miss (6–5)
- Wyoming (6–6)

=== Bowl–ineligible teams ===
- ACC (3): Florida State, Louisville, North Carolina
- American (5): East Carolina, Navy, SMU, Tulsa, UConn
- Big Ten (5): Illinois, Indiana, Maryland, Nebraska, Rutgers
- Big 12 (3): Kansas, Kansas State, Texas Tech
- C-USA (7): Charlotte, Florida Atlantic, Old Dominion, Rice, UTEP, UTSA, Western Kentucky
- MAC (5): Akron, Ball State, Bowling Green, Central Michigan, Kent State
- Mountain West (5): Air Force, Colorado State, New Mexico, San Jose State, UNLV
- Pac-12 (5): Arizona, Colorado, Oregon State, UCLA, USC
- SEC (3): Arkansas, Ole Miss, (Note: Ole Miss had a two-year bowl ban which applied for the 2017 and 2018 seasons. However, they would have been ineligible under normal circumstances, as they finished with a 5–7 record.) Tennessee
- Sun Belt (4): Coastal Carolina, Georgia State, South Alabama, Texas State
- Independent (3): Liberty, (Note: Liberty is bowl ineligible until 2019, due to their transition from FCS to FBS. Liberty had six wins and could have requested an NCAA waiver, had there been insufficient bowl-eligible teams.) New Mexico State, UMass

Number of bowl-ineligible teams: 48

== Television ratings ==
=== Non-CFP bowl games ===
Rank	Date	Matchup				Network	Viewers (millions)	TV rating	Game	Location
1	January 1, 2019, 5:00 ET	#9 Washington	23	#6 Ohio State	28	ESPN	16.7	8.9	Rose Bowl	Rose Bowl, Pasadena, CA
2	January 1, 2019, 8:45 ET	#15 Texas	28	#5 Georgia	21	ESPN	13.3	7.3	Sugar Bowl	Mercedes-Benz Superdome, New Orleans, LA
3	January 1, 2019, 1:00 ET	#11 LSU	40	#8 UCF	32	ESPN	8.5	4.7	Fiesta Bowl	State Farm Stadium, Glendale, AZ
4	December 29, 2018, 12:00 ET	#10 Florida	41	#7 Michigan	15	ESPN	8.4	5.0	Peach Bowl	Mercedes-Benz Stadium. Atlanta, GA
5	January 1, 2019, 1:00 ET	#14 Kentucky	27	#12 Penn State	24	ABC	7.7	4.4	Citrus Bowl	Camping World Stadium, Orlando, FL
6	December 28, 2018, 9:00 ET	#24 Iowa State	26	#13 Washington State	28	ESPN	5.5	3.2	Alamo Bowl	Alamodome, San Antonio, TX
7	December 31, 2018, 7:30 ET	NC State	13	#19 Texas A&M	52	ESPN	5.1	2.7	Gator Bowl	TIAA Bank Field, Jacksonville, FL
8	December 28, 2018, 5:15 ET	#16 West Virginia	18	#20 Syracuse	34	ESPN	4.8	2.8	Camping World Bowl	Camping World Stadium, Orlando, FL
9	December 31, 2018, 3:45 ET	#23 Missouri	33	Oklahoma State	38	ESPN	3.8	2.3	Liberty Bowl	Liberty Bowl Memorial Stadium, Memphis, TN
10	December 27, 2018, 5:15 ET	Miami (FL)	3	Wisconsin	35	ESPN	3.8	2.3	Pinstripe Bowl	Yankee Stadium, Bronx, NY

#CFP Rankings.

=== College Football Playoff ===
Game	Date	Matchup				Network	Viewers (millions)	TV rating	Location
Cotton Bowl (semifinal)	December 29, 2018, 4:00 ET	#3 Notre Dame	3	#2 Clemson	30	ESPN	16.9	9.4	AT&T Stadium, Arlington, TX
Orange Bowl (semifinal)	December 29, 2018, 8:00 ET	#4 Oklahoma	34	#1 Alabama	45	ESPN	19.1	9.9	Hard Rock Stadium, Miami Gardens, FL
National Championship	January 7, 2019, 8:00 ET	#2 Clemson	44	#1 Alabama	16	ESPN	25.3	13.6	Levi's Stadium, Santa Clara, CA

== See also ==
- Bowl Challenge Cup
