= 2019 NCAA football bowl games =

In college football, 2019 NCAA football bowl games may refer to:

- 2018–19 NCAA football bowl games, for games played in January 2019 as part of the 2018 season.
- 2019–20 NCAA football bowl games, for games played in December 2019 as part of the 2019 season.
