= Isaiah Wright =

American football player (born 1997)

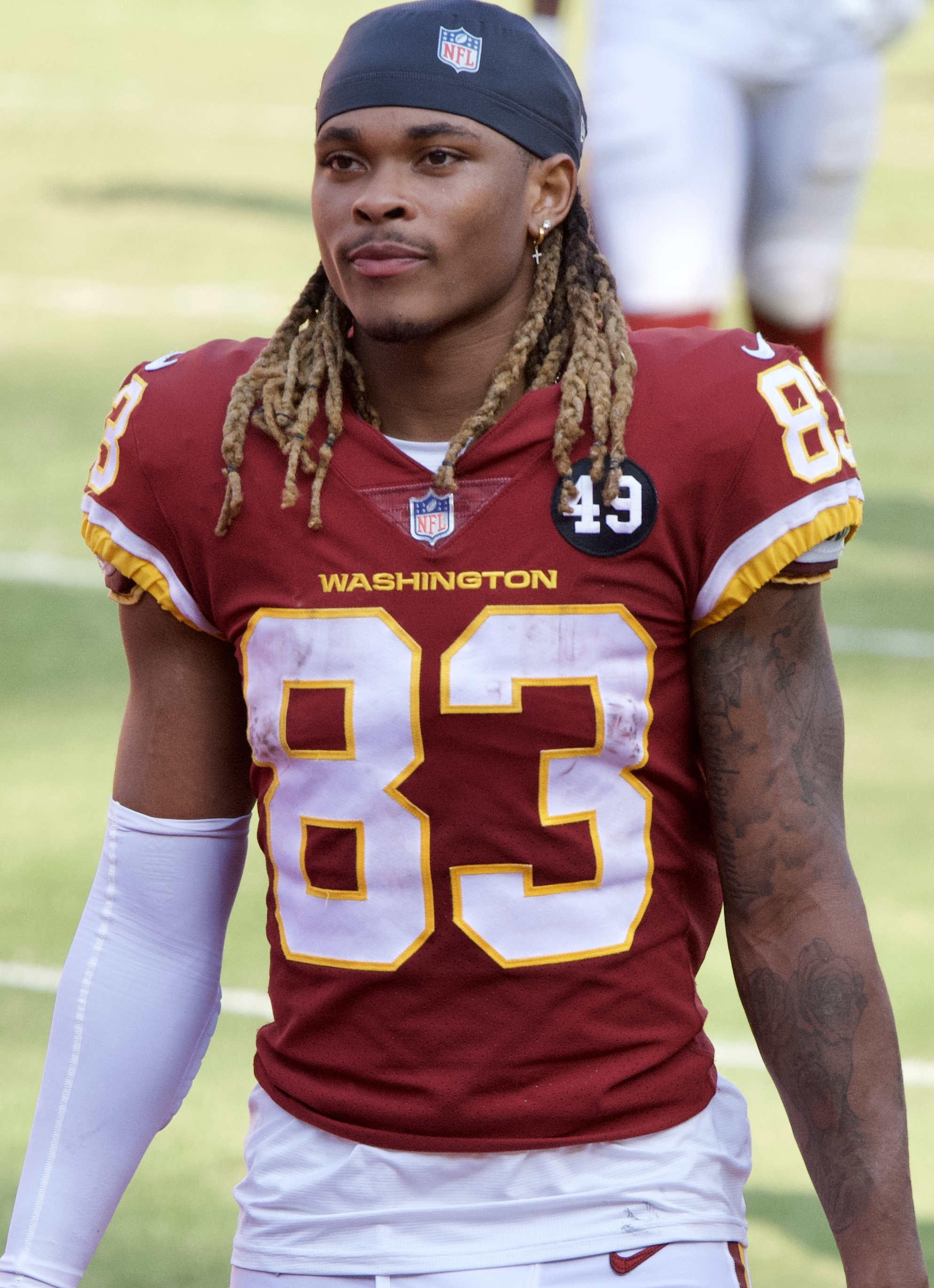
- Wright with the Washington Football Team in 2020

No. 83
- Position: Wide receiver

Personal information
- Born: January 13, 1997 (age 29); Waterbury, Connecticut, U.S.
- Listed height: 6 ft 1 in (1.85 m)
- Listed weight: 220 lb (100 kg)

Career information
- High school: Kingswood Oxford School (West Hartford, Connecticut)
- College: Temple
- NFL draft: 2020: undrafted

Career history
- Washington Football Team (2020); Toronto Argonauts (2022)

Awards and highlights
- First-team All-AAC (2018); AAC Special Teams Player of the Year (2018)

Career NFL statistics
- Receptions: 27
- Receiving yards: 197
- Rushing yards: 16
- Return yards: 45
- Stats at Pro Football Reference

Isaiah Wright (born January 13, 1997) is an American former professional football player who was a wide receiver in the National Football League (NFL) and Canadian Football League (CFL). He played college football for the Temple Owls and was signed by the Washington Football Team of the NFL as an undrafted free agent in 2020. He also played for the Toronto Argonauts of the CFL.

== Early life ==
Wright was born in Waterbury, Connecticut and grew up in West Hartford, Connecticut. He attended the Kingswood Oxford School, where he played wide receiver and defensive back on the football team. Wright was rated a three-star recruit and initially committed to play college football for the Rutgers Scarlet Knights going into his senior year over offers from Ohio State, Wisconsin, and Maryland but changed his commitment to Temple shortly before National Signing Day.

== College career ==
As a freshman, he rushed for 232 yards and scored one touchdown on 42 attempts while catching eight passes for 74 yards. He had 46 receptions for 668 yards and four touchdowns in his sophomore season. Wright also rushed for 188 yards and one touchdown as a wildcat quarterback and completed a pass for a two-point conversion. As a junior, he gained 368 yards and scored three touchdowns on 33 receptions and rushed for 84 yards and a touchdown while also returning 33 kickoffs for 873 yards and a touchdown and 19 punts for 249 yards and two touchdowns and was named a Sporting News First-team All-American, the AAC Special Teams Player of the Year, and First-team All-AAC. Wright caught 47 passes for 442 yards and five touchdowns in his senior season.

== Professional career ==
Pre-draft measurables
Height	Weight	Arm length	Hand span
6 ft 1 in (1.85 m)	216 lb (98 kg)	31 3/8 in (0.80 m)	8 1/8 in (0.21 m)
All values from Pro Day

=== Washington Football Team ===
Wright was signed by the Washington Football Team as an undrafted free agent on April 28, 2020. Wright made his NFL debut on September 13 in the team's season opener against the Philadelphia Eagles, playing ten snaps on special teams. Two weeks later, in a game against the Cleveland Browns, he recorded the first four catches of his NFL career, for a total of 24 yards. He finished his rookie season with 27 receptions for 197 yards.

On August 31, 2021, Wright was waived by Washington as a part of final roster cuts.

=== Toronto Argonauts ===
On April 6, 2022, Wright signed a contract with the Toronto Argonauts of the Canadian Football League (CFL). He was released by the Argonauts on September 27. Wright played in five games for the Argonauts, making two receptions for 26 yards. He also returned 10 punts for 58 yards and seven kickoffs for 169 yards.
