= 2018 Military Bowl =

College football bowl game

2018 Military Bowl presented by Northrop Grumman
- 11th Military Bowl
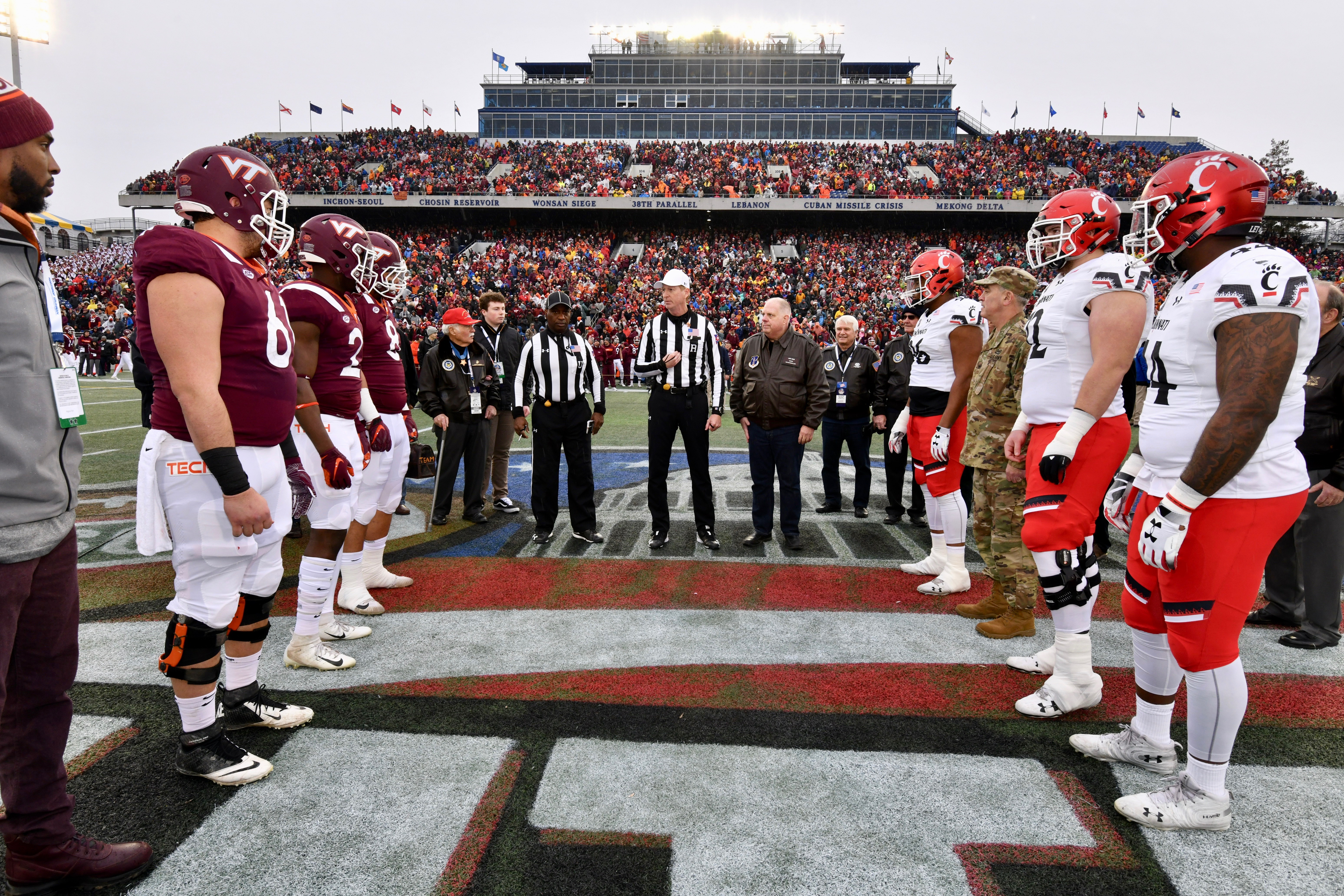
- Coin toss prior to the game
Cincinnati Bearcats	Virginia Tech Hokies
(10–2)	(6–6)
The American	ACC
35	31
Head coach: Luke Fickell	Head coach: Justin Fuente
	1	2	3	4	Total
Cincinnati	7	7	7	14	35
Virginia Tech	7	7	10	7	31
- Date: December 31, 2018
- Season: 2018
- Stadium: Navy–Marine Corps Memorial Stadium
- Location: Annapolis, Maryland
- MVP: Michael Warren II (RB, Cincinnati)
- Favorite: Cincinnati by 5
- Referee: Kevin Hassell (Mountain West)
- Attendance: 32,832
- Payout: US$2,067,000

United States TV coverage
- Network: ESPN & ESPN Radio
- Announcers: Mike Corey, Rene Ingoglia and Alex Corddry (ESPN); Marc Kestecher and Brad Edwards (ESPN Radio)

The 2018 Military Bowl was a college football bowl game that was played on December 31, 2018. It was the 11th edition of the Military Bowl, and was one of the 2018–19 bowl games concluding the 2018 FBS football season. Sponsored by defense contractor Northrop Grumman, the game was officially known as the Military Bowl presented by Northrop Grumman.

== Teams ==
The game was played between Virginia Tech of the Atlantic Coast Conference (ACC) and Cincinnati of the American Athletic Conference (The American). The two programs had previously met 11 times, with Virginia Tech holding a 6–5 lead in the series. It was their second meeting in the Military Bowl, having previously contested the 2014 edition, with Virginia Tech winning 33–17.

=== Virginia Tech Hokies ===
Virginia Tech received and accepted a bid to the Military Bowl on December 2. The Hokies entered the bowl with a 6–6 record (4–4 in conference). After starting the season 4–2, the Hokies lost four games in a row, then finished with two wins, giving them the six wins needed for bowl eligibility. This was Virginia Tech's 26th consecutive bowl appearance, having played in a bowl every season since the 1993 Independence Bowl.

=== Cincinnati Bearcats ===
Cincinnati received and accepted a bid to the Military Bowl on December 2. The Bearcats entered the bowl with a 10–2 record (6–2 in conference).

== Game summary ==
=== Scoring summary ===
Scoring summary

Quarter	Time	Drive			Team	Scoring information	Score	
Quarter	Time	Plays	Yards	TOP	Team	Scoring information	CIN	VT
1	10:22	10	63	4:38	VT	Eric Kumah 21-yard touchdown reception from Ryan Willis, Brian Johnson kick good	0	7
1	7:46	6	75	2:36	CIN	Charles McClelland 38-yard touchdown reception from Desmond Ridder, Ryan Jones kick good	7	7
2	11:22	7	50	3:31	CIN	Michael Warren (CIN) fumble recovered by Kahlil Lewis in the end zone, Ryan Jones kick good	14	7
2	7:04	12	84	4:18	VT	Steven Peoples 1-yard touchdown run, Brian Johnson kick good	14	14
3	10:21	8	69	3:43	VT	28-yard field goal by Brian Johnson	14	17
3	9:16	6	65	1:05	CIN	Michael Warren 40-yard touchdown run, Ryan Jones kick good	21	17
3	1:52	14	72	4:13	VT	Chris Cunningham 2-yard touchdown reception from Ryan Willis, Brian Johnson kick good	21	24
4	12:44	10	75	4:08	CIN	Hayden Moore 19-yard touchdown run, Ryan Jones kick good	28	24
4	10:32	4	45	2:12	VT	Ryan Willis 5-yard touchdown run, Brian Johnson kick good	28	31
4	1:29	5	64	2:16	CIN	Michael Warren 8-yard touchdown run, Ryan Jones kick good	35	31
"TOP" = time of possession. For other American football terms, see Glossary of American football.							35	31

=== Statistics ===
	1	2	3	4	Total
Bearcats	7	7	7	14	35
Hokies	7	7	10	7	31

Statistics	CIN	VT
First downs	23	24
Plays–yards	68–462	76–443
Rushes–yards	36–256	45–224
Passing yards	206	219
Passing: comp–att–int	15–32–1	20–31–1
Time of possession	28:55	31:05

Team	Category	Player	Statistics
Cincinnati	Passing	Hayden Moore	11/25, 120 yds, 1 INT
Cincinnati	Rushing	Michael Warren	20 car, 166 yds, 2 TD
Cincinnati	Receiving	Charles McClelland	2 rec, 47 yds, 1 TD
Virginia Tech	Passing	Ryan Willis	20/31, 219 yds, 2 TD, 1 INT
Virginia Tech	Rushing	Deshawn McClease	13 car, 102 yds
Virginia Tech	Receiving	Damon Hazelton	6 rec, 57 yds
