= Roderic Teamer =

American football player (born 1997)

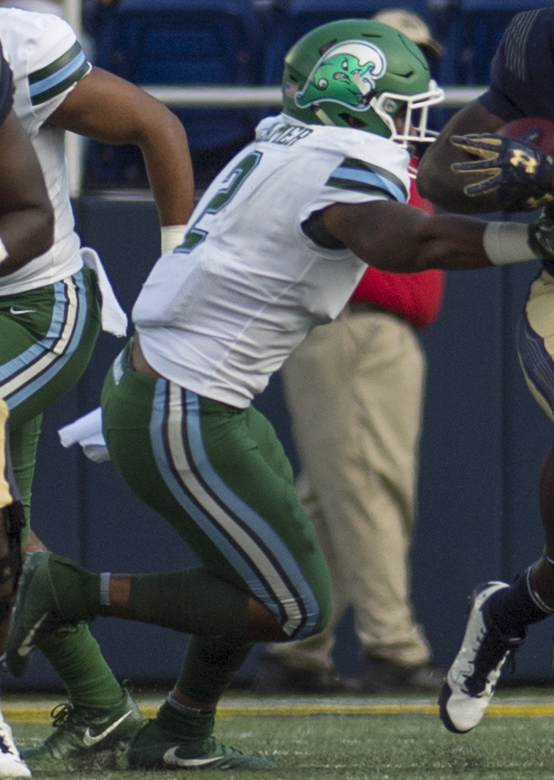
- Teamer with the Tulane Green Wave in 2017

Profile
- Position: Safety

Personal information
- Born: May 12, 1997 (age 29); New Orleans, Louisiana, U.S.
- Listed height: 5 ft 11 in (1.80 m)
- Listed weight: 187 lb (85 kg)

Career information
- High school: Brother Martin (New Orleans, Louisiana)
- College: Tulane
- NFL draft: 2019: undrafted

Career history
- Los Angeles Chargers (2019); Indianapolis Colts (2021)*; Las Vegas Raiders (2021–2023); New Orleans Saints (2024)
- * Offseason or practice squad member only

Awards and highlights
- Second-team All-AAC (2018)

Career NFL statistics
- Total tackles: 103
- Sacks: 1
- Forced fumbles: 0
- Pass deflections: 3
- Interceptions: 1
- Stats at Pro Football Reference

Roderic Fitzgerald Teamer Jr. (born May 12, 1997) is an American professional football safety. He has previously played in the National Football League (NFL) for the Los Angeles Chargers, Las Vegas Raiders, and New Orleans Saints. He played college football at Tulane.

== Early life ==
Teamer was born and grew up in New Orleans, Louisiana and attended Brother Martin High School. He was named first team All-Metro and first team All-State as a senior after recording 116 tackles, two interceptions and a sack.

== College career ==
Teamer played four seasons for the Tulane Green Wave. He became a starter at cornerback towards the end of his freshman season. He made 48 tackles (3.5 for loss) with two passes broken up, a blocked kick and a fumble recovery, which he returned 52 yards for a touchdown in his junior season. As a senior, Teamer finished second on the team with 72 tackles along with six passes broken up and an interception and was named second team All-American Athletic Conference. He finished his collegiate career with 197 tackles, 15 passes defensed, three interceptions and three sacks in 46 games played.

== Professional career ==
Pre-draft measurables
Height	Weight	Arm length	Hand span	40-yard dash	10-yard split	20-yard split	20-yard shuttle	Three-cone drill	Vertical jump	Broad jump	Bench press
5 ft 10 3/4 in (1.80 m)	187 lb (85 kg)	31 1/2 in (0.80 m)	9 1/4 in (0.23 m)	4.61 s	1.59 s	2.67 s	4.33 s	7.21 s	37.0 in (0.94 m)	10 ft 3 in (3.12 m)	6 reps
All values from Pro Day

=== Los Angeles Chargers ===
Teamer signed with the Los Angeles Chargers as an undrafted free agent on April 27, 2019. He made his NFL debut on September 22, 2019 against the Houston Texans, starting at strong safety and making seven tackles. Teamer recorded his first career interception on October 20, 2019 in a 20-23 loss to the Tennessee Titans, picking off a pass thrown by Ryan Tannehill. In Week 8 against the Chicago Bears, Teamer recorded a team high 8 tackles and sacked quarterback Mitch Trubisky once in the 17–16 win. Teamer finished his rookie season with 40 tackles, one sack, two passes defended and one interception in seven games played (six starts).

On July 13, 2020, Teamer was suspended for the first four games of the 2020 NFL season for violating the NFL's policy on substance abuse. He was waived on August 1, 2020.

=== Indianapolis Colts ===
On January 10, 2021, Teamer signed a reserve/futures contract with the Indianapolis Colts. He was waived on May 14, 2021.

=== Las Vegas Raiders ===
Teamer signed with the Las Vegas Raiders on June 3, 2021. He was placed on injured reserve on October 20. Teamer was activated on November 20. In Week 12 against the Dallas Cowboys, Teamer was ejected by the game for a fight on the sideline with Kelvin Joseph. Teamer finished his season playing in 10 games (two starts), recording 18 tackles.

In 2022, Teamer appeared in all 17 games for the first time in his career, with three starts, and recording 35 tackles (23 solo).

On March 15, 2023, Teamer re-signed with the Raiders. He was placed on injured reserve on October 18. He was activated on November 25.

On November 25, 2023, Teamer was arrested for driving under the influence (DUI) and speeding. He was waived by the Raiders on November 27.

=== New Orleans Saints ===
On June 20, 2024, Teamer signed with the New Orleans Saints. He was released on August 27. Teamer was re-signed to the practice squad on October 22. On December 4, Teamer was suspended 3 games after violating the NFL's substance–abuse policy. He was released by New Orleans on December 21.
