= Nate Harvey =

American gridiron football player (born 1996)

Profile
- Position: Linebacker

Personal information
- Born: September 15, 1996 (age 30); Williamston, North Carolina, U.S.
- Listed height: 5 ft 11 in (1.80 m)
- Listed weight: 237 lb (108 kg)

Career information
- High school: Knightdale (Knightdale, North Carolina)
- College: East Carolina
- NFL draft: 2019: undrafted

Career history
- New York Giants (2019); Hamilton Tiger-Cats (2021)*
- * Offseason or practice squad member only

Awards and highlights
- AAC Defensive Player of the Year (2018)
- Stats at Pro Football Reference

Nathaniel Harvey IV (born September 15, 1996) is an American former professional football linebacker. He played college football at East Carolina.

== College career ==
Harvey spent his freshman and sophomore seasons at Georgia Military Junior College and joined East Carolina as a walk-on transfer for his junior and senior seasons.

Harvey played running back for his freshman, sophomore, and junior seasons before switching to defensive end for his senior season.

After recording 14.5 sacks in his senior season, he was named the AAC Defensive Player of the Year.

Harvey was entered in the 2019 NFL draft after being denied a fifth year of eligibility by the NCAA.

== Professional career ==
=== New York Giants ===
After going undrafted in the 2019 NFL draft, Harvey signed with the New York Giants.

Harvey was placed on injured reserve after suffering a knee injury during mini camp. He was waived on April 8, 2020, with a failed physical designation.

=== Hamilton Tiger-Cats ===
Harvey signed with the Hamilton Tiger-Cats of the CFL on March 12, 2021. He was released on July 26, 2021.

== Personal life ==
Harvey is the son of Nathaniel Harvey III and Zelinka Harvey.
