= Hayden Moore =

American football player (born 1995)

No. 3
- Position: Quarterback

Personal information
- Born: July 5, 1995 (age 31); Clay, Alabama, U.S.
- Listed height: 6 ft 3 in (1.91 m)
- Listed weight: 215 lb (98 kg)

Career information
- High school: Clay-Chalkville (Pinson, Alabama)
- College: Cincinnati
- NFL draft: 2019: undrafted

Career history
- Hamilton Tiger-Cats (2019–2020)

Career CFL statistics
- Games played–started: 18–1
- Passing completions: 20
- Passing attempts: 30
- Passing yards: 222
- TD–INT: 0–4
- Stats at CFL.ca

Hayden Leon Moore (born July 5, 1995) is an American former professional football player who was a quarterback for the Hamilton Tiger-Cats of the Canadian Football League (CFL) in 2019.. He played college football for the Cincinnati Bearcats.

== College career ==
=== Statistics ===
In his first season as quarterback at the University of Cincinnati, Moore threw for 1,885 yards, helping the Bearcats secure third place in their conference. 2016 saw Moore play as starting QB for the first time, where he threw for 1,744, an effort that was only enough for Cincinnati to reach 4th in the division. 2017 was a breakout year for Moore; however, he was unable to convert his exemplary stats into wins for the Bearcats, with Cincinnati finishing the season with only 4 wins.

Year	Team	Games			Passing								Rushing			
Year	Team	GP	GS	Record	Cmp	Att	Pct	Yds	Avg	TD	Int	Rtg	Att	Yds	Avg	TD
2015	Cincinnati	8	3	1−2	133	225	59.1	1,885	8.4	9	11	132.9	56	22	0.4	2
2016	Cincinnati	7	7	2−5	146	255	57.3	1,744	6.8	11	7	123.4	53	45	0.8	2
2017	Cincinnati	12	12	4−8	239	424	56.4	2,562	6.0	20	9	118.4	92	312	3.4	4
2018	Cincinnati	6	2	2−0	27	51	52.9	327	6.8	2	1	115.8	24	124	5.2	2
Career		33	24	9−15	518	955	56.4	6,518	7.0	42	28	122.6	225	503	2.4	10

== Professional career ==
On May 2, 2019, Moore signed with the Hamilton Tiger-Cats as their third-string quarterback. He played during Week 2 of the CFL Preseason, playing the second half against the Ottawa Redblacks. Moore threw 176 yards and 2 touchdowns to win the game for Hamilton. Moore also played the last 8 minutes of Hamilton's Week 3 Preseason game against the Toronto Argonauts, throwing for 30 yards with 57% efficiency; however, Moore's efforts were not enough to overcome the Argos' defence, and the Ticats lost the game 30-23. He re-signed with the Tiger-Cats on January 7, 2021. He retired from football on June 28, 2021.
