= Kahlil Lewis =

American gridiron football player (born 1997)

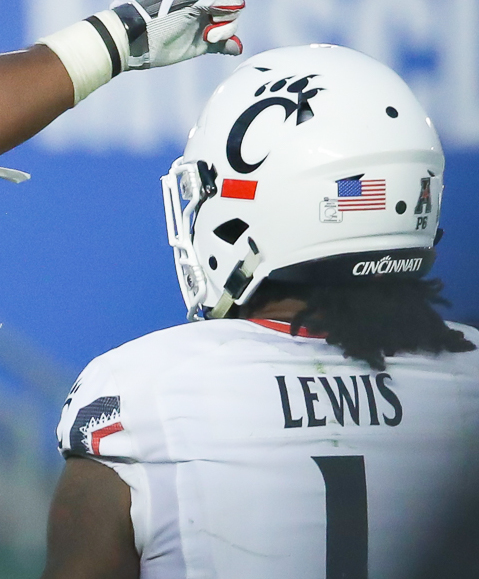
- Lewis with the Cincinnati Bearcats in 2018

Profile
- Position: Wide receiver

Personal information
- Born: August 31, 1997 (age 29); Miramar, Florida, U.S.
- Listed height: 5 ft 10 in (1.78 m)
- Listed weight: 190 lb (86 kg)

Career information
- High school: Miramar (Florida)
- College: Cincinnati
- NFL draft: 2019: undrafted

Career history
- Atlanta Falcons (2019)*; Seattle Seahawks (2019)*; Houston Roughnecks (2020); Hamilton Tiger-Cats (2021)*; Philadelphia Stars (2022); Hamilton Tiger-Cats (2023)*
- * Offseason or practice squad member only

Kahlil Lewis (born August 31, 1997) is an American former professional football wide receiver. He was selected with the 15th overall pick in the 2nd round of the 2020 XFL draft. In the summer after his senior year of college, he spent time on the Seattle Seahawks and Atlanta Falcons roster before being waived a week before the season began. Lewis played four years of college football at the University of Cincinnati from 2015 to 2019.

== Early life ==
Lewis grew up in Miami, Florida. His father died when he was three years old. Lewis attended Miramar High School, where he played football and basketball. He averaged 15 points per game on the basketball court but decided to focus on football in college. Rated a three star recruit, Lewis committed to Cincinnati over offers from Ohio State, West Virginia, Louisville, Nebraska and his hometown Miami Hurricanes.

== College career ==
As a freshman at Cincinnati, Lewis largely played backup wide receiver and caught three passes for 53 yards. In his sophomore season in 2016, Lewis made 48 receptions for 605 yards and five touchdowns. As a junior, he was the team's primary receiver and had 61 catches for 676 yards and seven touchdowns, though the team finished 4–8. As a senior, Lewis had 56 receptions for 782 yards and nine touchdowns. On October 27, 2018, Lewis had 12 catches for 174 yards and two touchdowns against SMU. In his final game at Nippert Stadium, Lewis caught nine passes for 203 yards and three touchdowns in a win against East Carolina. He helped the Bearcats defeat Virginia Tech 35–31 in the 2018 Military Bowl and scored a touchdown on a fumble recovery.

== Professional career ==
=== Atlanta Falcons ===
Lewis was briefly signed by the Atlanta Falcons but waived in the preseason.

=== Seattle Seahawks ===
He was picked up by the Seattle Seahawks but waived on September 2, 2019.

=== Houston Roughnecks ===
Lewis was selected 15th overall by the Houston Roughnecks in the 2020 XFL draft. On February 8, 2020, in his XFL debut for Houston against the Los Angeles Wildcats, Lewis had five catches for 45 yards and a touchdown but garnered attention for vomiting on the field. He finished the season with 24 receptions for 220 yards and a touchdown. He had his contract terminated when the league suspended operations on April 10, 2020.

=== Hamilton Tiger-Cats (first stint) ===
Lewis signed with the Hamilton Tiger-Cats of the CFL on February 2, 2021. He was released on June 10, 2021.

=== Philadelphia Stars ===
Lewis signed with the Philadelphia Stars of the United States Football League on April 30, 2022, and was subsequently transferred to the team's inactive roster. On February 23, 2023, Lewis was released by the Stars.

=== Hamilton Tiger-Cats (second stint) ===
On March 8, 2023, Lewis signed with the Tiger-Cats for his second stint with the team. On June 3, 2023, Lewis was released by the Tiger-Cats.
