= Marquise Copeland =

American football player (born 1997)

No. 51 – Hamilton Tiger-Cats
- Position: Defensive end
- Roster status: Suspended
- CFL status: American

Personal information
- Born: May 9, 1997 (age 29); Cleveland, Ohio, U.S.
- Listed height: 6 ft 2 in (1.88 m)
- Listed weight: 287 lb (130 kg)

Career information
- High school: Bedford (OH)
- College: Cincinnati
- NFL draft: 2019: undrafted

Career history
- Los Angeles Rams (2019–2023); Hamilton Tiger-Cats (2025–present)*
- * Offseason or practice squad member only

Awards and highlights
- Super Bowl champion (LVI); Second-team All-AAC (2018)

Career NFL statistics
- Total tackles: 43
- Sacks: 1
- Stats at Pro Football Reference

Marquise Copeland (born May 9, 1997) is an American professional football defensive end for the Hamilton Tiger-Cats of the Canadian Football League (CFL). He was signed by the Los Angeles Rams as an undrafted free agent in 2019 following his college football career at Cincinnati.

== Professional career ==
Pre-draft measurables
Height	Weight	Arm length	Hand span	Wingspan	40-yard dash	10-yard split	20-yard split	20-yard shuttle	Three-cone drill	Vertical jump	Broad jump	Bench press
6 ft 2 1/8 in (1.88 m)	281 lb (127 kg)	32 in (0.81 m)	9 3/8 in (0.24 m)	6 ft 5 1/4 in (1.96 m)	5.00 s	1.82 s	2.93 s	4.84 s	7.50 s	30.5 in (0.77 m)	9 ft 2 in (2.79 m)	26 reps
All values from Pro Day

=== Los Angeles Rams ===
Copeland signed with the Los Angeles Rams as an undrafted free agent following the 2019 NFL draft on May 14, 2019. He was waived during final roster cuts on August 31, 2019, and signed to the team's practice squad the next day.

Copeland was signed to a reserve/futures contract with the Rams on January 9, 2020. He was waived during final roster cuts on September 5, 2020, and signed to the team's practice squad the next day. He was elevated to the active roster on September 12 for the week 1 game against the Dallas Cowboys, and then reverted to the team's practice squad following the game. He was placed on the practice squad/COVID-19 list by the team on December 22, 2020, and restored to the practice squad on December 26. On January 18, 2021, Copeland signed a reserve/futures contract with the Rams.

On August 31, 2021, Copeland was waived by the Rams and re-signed to the practice squad the next day. He was promoted to the active roster on November 26, 2021. Copeland became a Super Bowl champion when the Rams defeated the Cincinnati Bengals.

On March 27, 2023, Copeland re-signed with the Rams. He was waived on August 29, 2023 and re-signed to the practice squad. He was not signed to a reserve/future contract after the season and thus became a free agent when his practice squad contract expired.

=== Hamilton Tiger-Cats ===
Deen signed with the Hamilton Tiger-Cats of the Canadian Football League (CFL) on April 28, 2025. He was placed on the team's reserve/suspended list on May 17, 2025.
