= Cortez Broughton =

American football player (born 1996)

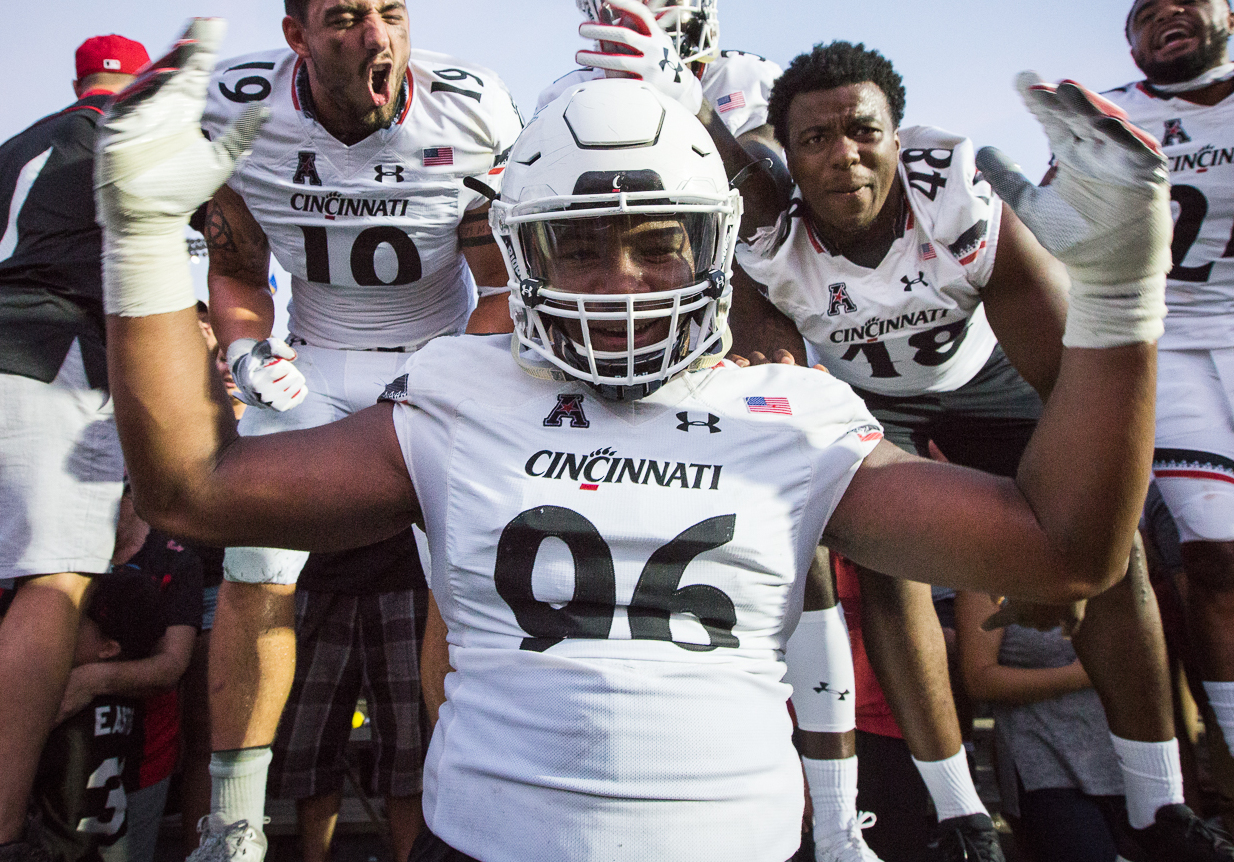
- Broughton with the Cincinnati Bearcats in 2018

No. 91, 79
- Position: Defensive tackle

Personal information
- Born: September 2, 1996 (age 30); Warner Robins, Georgia, U.S.
- Listed height: 6 ft 2 in (1.88 m)
- Listed weight: 293 lb (133 kg)

Career information
- High school: Veterans (Warner Robins)
- College: Cincinnati
- NFL draft: 2019: 7th round, 242nd overall pick

Career history
- Los Angeles Chargers (2019–2020); Kansas City Chiefs (2021–2022); Buffalo Bills (2022–2023)*
- * Offseason or practice squad member only

Awards and highlights
- First-team All-AAC (2018); Second-team All-AAC (2016)

Career NFL statistics
- Total tackles: 9
- Pass deflections: 1
- Stats at Pro Football Reference

Cortez A. Broughton (born September 2, 1996) is an American former professional football player who was a defensive tackle in the National Football League (NFL). He played college football for the Cincinnati Bearcats.

== Professional career ==
=== Los Angeles Chargers ===
Broughton was selected by the Los Angeles Chargers (242nd overall pick) in the seventh round of the 2019 NFL draft. On November 15, 2019, Broughton was placed on the non-football illness list.

On August 31, 2021, Broughton was waived by the Chargers.

=== Kansas City Chiefs ===
On September 3, 2021, Broughton was signed to the practice squad of the Kansas City Chiefs. He signed a reserve/future contract with the Chiefs on February 2, 2022. He was waived on July 27, 2022, after failing a physical. He was re-signed to the practice squad on September 27, 2022. He was released on October 11.

=== Buffalo Bills ===
On December 6, 2022, Broughton was signed to the Buffalo Bills practice squad. He signed a reserve/future contract on January 23, 2023. He was waived on August 27, 2023.
