= 2018 Virginia Tech Hokies football team =

American college football season

2018 Virginia Tech Hokies football

Military Bowl, L 31–35 vs. Cincinnati
- Conference: Atlantic Coast Conference
- Coastal Division
- Record: 6–7 (4–4 ACC)
- Head coach: Justin Fuente (3rd season)
- Offensive coordinator: Brad Cornelsen (3rd season)
- Offensive scheme: Spread
- Defensive coordinator: Bud Foster (24th season)
- Base defense: 4–4
- Home stadium: Lane Stadium

Uniform
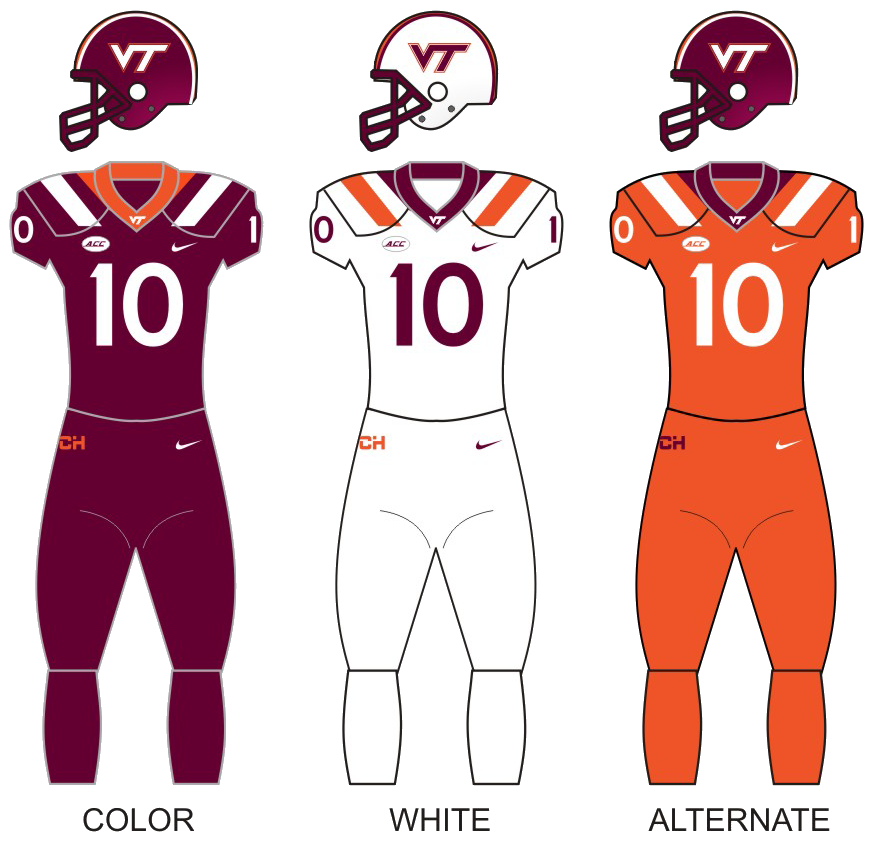

2018 Atlantic Coast Conference football standings
	Conf.			Overall
Team	W		L	W		L
Atlantic Division
No. 1 Clemson x$#^	8	–	0	15	–	0
No. 15 Syracuse	6	–	2	10	–	3
NC State	5	–	3	9	–	4
Boston College	4	–	4	7	–	5
Wake Forest	3	–	5	7	–	6
Florida State	3	–	5	5	–	7
Louisville	0	–	8	2	–	10
Coastal Division
Pittsburgh x	6	–	2	7	–	7
Georgia Tech	5	–	3	7	–	6
Miami (FL)	4	–	4	7	–	6
Virginia	4	–	4	8	–	5
Virginia Tech	4	–	4	6	–	7
Duke	3	–	5	8	–	5
North Carolina	1	–	7	2	–	9
Championship: Clemson 42, Pittsburgh 10
# – College Football Playoff champion; ^ – College Football Playoff participant; $ – Conference champion; x – Division champion/co-champions; Rankings from AP Poll

The 2018 Virginia Tech Hokies football team represented Virginia Tech during the 2018 NCAA Division I FBS football season. The Hokies were led by third-year head coach Justin Fuente and played their home games at Lane Stadium in Blacksburg, Virginia as members of the Coastal Division of the Atlantic Coast Conference (ACC). Virginia Tech finished the season with a losing record, the first season since the 1991 and 1992 football seasons when Virginia Tech experienced two such seasons back to back.

== Preseason ==
=== Award watch lists ===
Award	Player	Position	Year
Rimington Trophy	Kyle Chung	C	SR
Chuck Bednarik Award	Ricky Walker	DT	SR
Maxwell Award	Josh Jackson	QB	SO
Bronko Nagurski Trophy	Ricky Walker	DT	SR
Outland Trophy	Ricky Walker	DT	SR
Ray Guy Award	Oscar Bradburn	P	SO
Wuerffel Trophy	Ricky Walker	DT	SR
Manning Award	Josh Jackson	QB	SO

=== ACC media poll ===
The ACC media poll was released on July 24, 2018.

Media poll (Coastal)
Predicted finish	Team	Votes (1st place)
1	Miami	998 (122)
2	Virginia Tech	838 (16)
3	Georgia Tech	654 (8)
4	Duke	607 (1)
5	Pittsburgh	420
6	North Carolina	370 (1)
7	Virginia	257

== Schedule ==
Date	Time	Opponent	Rank	Site	TV	Result	Attendance	Source
September 3	8:00 p.m.	at No. 19 Florida State	No. 20	Doak Campbell Stadium; Tallahassee, FL	ESPN	W 24–3	75,237	
September 8	2:00 p.m.	William & Mary*	No. 12	Lane Stadium; Blacksburg, VA	ACCN Extra	W 62–17	65,632	
September 22	3:30 p.m.	at Old Dominion*	No. 13	Foreman Field; Norfolk, VA	CBSSN	L 35–49	20,532	
September 29	7:00 p.m.	at No. 22 Duke		Wallace Wade Stadium; Durham, NC	ESPN2	W 31–14	32,177	
October 6	8:00 p.m.	No. 6 Notre Dame*	No. 24	Lane Stadium; Blacksburg, VA	ABC	L 23–45	65,632	
October 13	7:00 p.m.	at North Carolina		Kenan Memorial Stadium; Chapel Hill, NC	ESPNU	W 22–19	50,500	
October 25	7:30 p.m.	Georgia Tech		Lane Stadium; Blacksburg, VA (rivalry)	ESPN	L 28–49	65,632	
November 3	3:45 p.m.	No. 24 Boston College^{†}		Lane Stadium; Blacksburg, VA (rivalry)	ACCN	L 21–31	65,632	
November 10	3:30 p.m.	at Pittsburgh		Heinz Field; Pittsburgh, PA	ESPNU	L 22–52	44,398	
November 17	3:30 p.m.	Miami (FL)		Lane Stadium; Blacksburg, VA (rivalry)	ESPN	L 14–38	62,379	
November 23	3:30 p.m.	Virginia		Lane Stadium; Blacksburg, VA (Commonwealth Cup)	ABC	W 34–31 ^{OT}	60,776	
December 1 (Note: The game between Virginia Tech and East Carolina, originally scheduled for September 15, 2018, was canceled in anticipation of Hurricane Florence. Seeking bowl eligibility, Tech scheduled Marshall, who also had a game canceled due to Hurricane Florence, which was contingent upon the Hokies defeating rival Virginia, which they did.)	12:00 p.m.	Marshall*		Lane Stadium; Blacksburg, VA	ACCN Extra	W 41–20	31,336	
December 31	12:00 p.m.	vs. Cincinnati*		Navy–Marine Corps Memorial Stadium; Annapolis, MD (Military Bowl)	ESPN	L 31–35	32,832	
*Non-conference game; ^{†}Homecoming; Rankings from AP Poll released prior to the game; All times are in Eastern time

== Coaching staff ==
Name	Title	Joined Staff
Justin Fuente	Head coach	2016
Bud Foster	Associate head coach, Defensive coordinator, & Linebackers	1987
Adam Lechtenberg	Assistant head coach, executive director of player development	2018
Zohn Burden	Running backs	2015
Brad Cornelsen	Offensive coordinator, Quarterbacks	2016
Brian Mitchell	Cornerbacks	2016
James Shibest	Special teams coordinator, Tight Ends	2016
Tyrone Nix	Safeties	2018
Vance Vice	Offensive line	2016
Holmon Wiggins	Wide receivers	2016
Charley Wiles	Defensive line	1996

== Game summaries ==
=== At Florida State ===
	1	2	3	4	Total
No. 20 Hokies	10	7	0	7	24
No. 19 Seminoles	0	3	0	0	3

=== William & Mary ===
	1	2	3	4	Total
Tribe	0	7	7	3	17
No. 12 Hokies	17	21	17	7	62

=== At Old Dominion ===
	1	2	3	4	Total
No. 13 Hokies	7	7	14	7	35
Monarchs	7	7	7	28	49

=== At Duke ===
	1	2	3	4	Total
Hokies	3	14	7	7	31
No. 22 Blue Devils	7	0	0	7	14

=== Notre Dame ===
	1	2	3	4	Total
No. 6 Fighting Irish	10	7	14	14	45
No. 24 Hokies	3	13	0	7	23

=== At North Carolina ===
	1	2	3	4	Total
Hokies	7	0	7	8	22
Tar Heels	6	3	7	3	19

=== Georgia Tech ===
	1	2	3	4	Total
Yellow Jackets	14	14	14	7	49
Hokies	14	7	0	7	28

Georgia Tech scored 7 touchdowns on the night, which is the most in Lane Stadium since the 1970s. They accomplished this feat 100% on the ground, racking up over 460 yards without completing a single pass. This game also marked the second straight time the backup QB for GT got the start on the road in the GT-VT series. GT is now 4–1 against the Hokies over the last 5 years.

=== Boston College ===
	1	2	3	4	Total
No. 24 Eagles	7	0	14	10	31
Hokies	7	7	0	7	21

=== At Pittsburgh ===
	1	2	3	4	Total
Hokies	0	7	8	7	22
Panthers	10	21	7	14	52

=== Miami (FL) ===
	1	2	3	4	Total
Hurricanes	3	14	21	0	38
Hokies	7	7	0	0	14

=== Virginia ===
	1	2	3	4	OT	Total
Cavaliers	0	0	14	17	0	31
Hokies	0	14	3	14	3	34

=== Marshall ===
	1	2	3	4	Total
Thundering Herd	6	0	0	14	20
Hokies	10	21	3	7	41

=== Vs. Cincinnati (Military Bowl) ===
	1	2	3	4	Total
Bearcats	7	7	7	14	35
Hokies	7	7	10	7	31

== Honorary #25 Beamer Jersey ==
Since the start of the 2016 season, during the week before each game, Head Coach Justin Fuente selects an outstanding player to wear the #25 jersey in honor of former head coach, Frank Beamer, who wore #25 as a player for Virginia Tech. The jersey represents hard work, toughness, good sportsmanship and being an exemplary teammate. At first, the distinction was intended strictly for special teams players, but has since been expanded to include all team members.

The players honored in the 2018 season are:

Game	Opponent	Player
Game 1	Florida State	Ricky Walker (2)
Game 2	William & Mary	Eric Kumah
Game 3	Old Dominion	Jovonn Quillen (2)
Game 4	Duke	Oscar Bradburn (2)
Game 5	Notre Dame	Khalil Ladler
Game 6	North Carolina	Chamarri Conner (Fr)
Game 7	Georgia Tech	Dax Hollifield (Fr)
Game 8	Boston College	Dalton Keene
Game 9	Pittsburgh	Divine Deablo
Game 10	Miami	Steven Peoples (2)
Game 11	Virginia	Ricky Walker (3)
Game 12	Marshall	Tré Turner (Fr)
Military Bowl	Cincinnati	Coleman Fox

== Rankings ==
Ranking movements Legend: ██ Increase in ranking ██ Decrease in ranking — = Not ranked RV = Received votes
	Week															
Poll	Pre	1	2	3	4	5	6	7	8	9	10	11	12	13	14	Final
AP	20	12	13	13	RV	24	—	—	—	—	—	—	—	—	—	
Coaches	17	14	11	10	24	23	RV	RV	RV	RV	—	—	—	—	—	
CFP	Not released									—	—	—	—	—	—	Not released
