= 2018 Birmingham Bowl =

College football bowl game

2018 Jared Birmingham Bowl
- 13th Birmingham Bowl
| Memphis Tigers | Wake Forest Demon Deacons |
| (8–5) | (6–6) |
| The American | ACC |
| 34 | 37 |
| Head coach: Mike Norvell | Head coach: Dave Clawson |
| | 1 | 2 | 3 | 4 | Total |
|---|---|---|---|---|---|
| Memphis | 14 | 14 | 0 | 6 | 34 |
| Wake Forest | 7 | 17 | 6 | 7 | 37 |
- Date: December 22, 2018
- Season: 2018
- Stadium: Legion Field
- Location: Birmingham, Alabama
- MVP: Jamie Newman (QB, Wake Forest)
- Favorite: Memphis by 4.5
- Referee: Rodney Burnette (Conference USA)
- Attendance: 25,717
- Payout: US$1,650,000

United States TV coverage
- Network: ESPN
- Announcers: Dave Neal, D.J. Shockley and Dawn Davenport

The 2018 Birmingham Bowl was a college football bowl game played on December 22, 2018. It was the 13th edition of the Birmingham Bowl, and one of the 2018–19 bowl games concluding the 2018 FBS football season. Sponsored by the Jared brand of Sterling Jewelers, the game was officially named the Jared Birmingham Bowl.

== Teams ==
The bowl was slated to invite teams from the Southeastern Conference (SEC) and the American Athletic Conference (The American). However, with four SEC teams selected for New Year's Six games, the Birmingham Bowl matchup announced on December 2 featured Wake Forest from the Atlantic Coast Conference (ACC), rather than an SEC team, to face Memphis from The American. The two programs previously met four times, each team winning twice, between 1964 and 1967.

=== Memphis Tigers ===
Memphis was defeated in the 2018 American Athletic Conference Football Championship Game played on December 1; they received and accepted a bid to the Birmingham Bowl on December 2. The Tigers entered the bowl with a 8–5 record (5–3 in conference).

=== Wake Forest Demon Deacons ===
Wake Forest received and accepted a bid to the Birmingham Bowl on December 2. The Demon Deacons entered the bowl with a 6–6 record (3–5 in conference).

== Game summary ==
=== Scoring summary ===
Scoring summary

| Quarter | Time | Drive | | | Team | Scoring information | Score | |
| Quarter | Time | Plays | Yards | TOP | Team | Scoring information | MEM | WF |
|---|---|---|---|---|---|---|---|---|
| 1 | 12:28 | 10 | 75 | 2:32 | WF | Sage Surratt 9-yard touchdown reception from Jamie Newman, Nick Sciba kick good | 0 | 7 |
| 1 | 10:06 | 6 | 76 | 2:22 | MEM | Tony Pollard 41-yard touchdown run, Riley Patterson kick good | 7 | 7 |
| 1 | 3:28 | 16 | 98 | 5:29 | MEM | Patrick Taylor Jr. 1-yard touchdown reception from Brady White, Nick Sciba kick good | 14 | 7 |
| 2 | 14:49 | | | | MEM | Interception returned 37 yards for touchdown by Chris Claybrooks, Riley Patterson kick good | 21 | 7 |
| 2 | 11:16 | 13 | 57 | 3:33 | WF | 36-yard field goal by Nick Sciba | 21 | 10 |
| 2 | 11:04 | | | | MEM | Kickoff returned 97 yards for touchdown by Tony Pollard, Nick Sciba kick good | 28 | 10 |
| 2 | 7:09 | 12 | 75 | 3:55 | WF | Jamie Newman 1-yard touchdown run, Nick Sciba kick good | 28 | 17 |
| 2 | 5:33 | 3 | 56 | 0:26 | WF | Jamie Newman 17-yard touchdown run, Nick Sciba kick good | 28 | 24 |
| 3 | 7:41 | 5 | 48 | 1:40 | WF | 49-yard field goal by Nick Sciba | 28 | 27 |
| 3 | 3:49 | 12 | 47 | 2:31 | WF | 39-yard field goal by Nick Sciba | 28 | 30 |
| 4 | 1:15 | 14 | 88 | 4:36 | MEM | Patrick Taylor Jr. 9-yard touchdown run, 2-point pass failed (intercepted) | 34 | 30 |
| 4 | 0:34 | 6 | 75 | 0:41 | WF | Jamie Newman 1-yard touchdown run, Nick Sciba kick good | 34 | 37 |
| "TOP" = time of possession. For other American football terms, see Glossary of American football. | | | | | | | 34 | 37 |

=== Statistics ===
| | 1 | 2 | 3 | 4 | Total |
|---|---|---|---|---|---|
| Tigers | 14 | 14 | 0 | 6 | 34 |
| Demon Deacons | 7 | 17 | 6 | 7 | 37 |

| Statistics | MEM | WF |
|---|---|---|
| First downs | 22 | 26 |
| Plays–yards | 82–378 | 90–529 |
| Rushes–yards | 53–207 | 50–201 |
| Passing yards | 171 | 328 |
| Passing: Comp–Att–Int | 15–29–1 | 22–40–1 |
| Time of possession | 30:38 | 29:22 |

| Team | Category | Player | Statistics |
|---|---|---|---|
| Memphis | Passing | Brady White | 15/27, 171 yds, 1 TD, 1 INT |
| Memphis | Rushing | Patrick Taylor | 30 car, 110 yds, 1 TD |
| Memphis | Receiving | Damonte Coxie | 6 rec, 70 yds |
| Wake Forest | Passing | Jamie Newman | 22/40, 328 yds, 1 TD, 1 INT |
| Wake Forest | Rushing | Jamie Newman | 23 car, 91 yds, 3 TD |
| Wake Forest | Receiving | Alex Bachman | 7 rec, 171 yds |
