= 2018 SMU Mustangs football team =

American college football season

2018 SMU Mustangs football
- Conference: American Athletic Conference
- West Division
- Record: 5–7 (4–4 The American)
- Head coach: Sonny Dykes (1st season)
- Offensive coordinator: Rhett Lashlee (1st season)
- Offensive scheme: Bear raid
- Defensive coordinator: Kevin Kane (1st season)
- Base defense: 3–4
- Home stadium: Gerald J. Ford Stadium

2018 American Athletic Conference football standings
	Conf.			Overall
Team	W		L	W		L
East Division
No. 11 UCF x$	8	–	0	12	–	1
Temple	7	–	1	8	–	5
No. 24 Cincinnati	6	–	2	11	–	2
South Florida	3	–	5	7	–	6
East Carolina	1	–	7	3	–	9
UConn	0	–	8	1	–	11
West Division
Memphis xy	5	–	3	8	–	6
Houston x	5	–	3	8	–	5
Tulane x	5	–	3	7	–	6
SMU	4	–	4	5	–	7
Navy	2	–	6	3	–	10
Tulsa	2	–	6	3	–	9
Championship: UCF 56, Memphis 41
$ – Conference champion; x – Division champion/co-champions; y – Championship game participant; Rankings from AP Poll

The 2018 SMU Mustangs football team represented Southern Methodist University in the 2018 NCAA Division I FBS football season. The Mustangs played their home games at Gerald J. Ford Stadium in Dallas, Texas and competed in the West Division of the American Athletic Conference. They were led by first-year coach Sonny Dykes and finished the season 5–7, 4–4 in American Athletic play to finish in fourth place in the West Division.

== Preseason ==
=== Award watch lists ===
Listed in the order that they were released

Award	Player	Position	Year
Maxwell Award	Xavier Jones	RB	JR
Doak Walker Award	Xavier Jones	RB	JR
Fred Biletnikoff Award	James Proche	WR	JR
Ray Guy Award	Jamie Sackville	P	JR
Paul Hornung Award	Braeden West	RB/KR	SR
Wuerffel Trophy	Jordan Wyatt	DB	SR
Manning Award	Ben Hicks	QB	JR
Earl Campbell Tyler Rose Award	Ben Hicks	QB	JR
Earl Campbell Tyler Rose Award	Xavier Jones	RB	SR

=== AAC media poll ===
The AAC media poll was released on July 24, 2018, with the Mustangs predicted to finish in fourth place in the AAC West Division.

Media poll (West)
Predicted finish	Team	Votes (1st place)
1	Memphis	171 (23)
2	Houston	146 (4)
3	Navy	129 (3)
4	SMU	72
5	Tulane	68
6	Tulsa	44

== Schedule ==
Date	Time	Opponent	Site	TV	Result	Attendance
September 1	6:30 p.m.	at North Texas*	Apogee Stadium; Denton, TX (Safeway Bowl)	Stadium	L 23–46	29,519
September 7	7:00 p.m.	No. 16 TCU*	Gerald J. Ford Stadium; Dallas, TX (rivalry)	ESPN2	L 12–42	24,216
September 15	2:30 p.m.	at No. 19 Michigan*	Michigan Stadium; Ann Arbor, MI	BTN	L 20–45	110,549
September 22	11:00 a.m.	Navy	Gerald J. Ford Stadium; Dallas, TX (Gansz Trophy)	ESPNews	W 31–30 ^{OT}	17,531
September 29	6:00 p.m.	Houston Baptist*	Gerald J. Ford Stadium; Dallas, TX	ESPN3	W 63–27	18,983
October 6	6:00 p.m.	at No. 12 UCF	Spectrum Stadium; Orlando, FL	ESPNU	L 20–48	40,856
October 20	2:30 p.m.	at Tulane	Yulman Stadium; New Orleans, LA	ESPNU	W 27–23	13,987
October 27	2:30 p.m.	Cincinnati	Gerald J. Ford Stadium; Dallas, TX	CBSSN	L 20–26 ^{OT}	16,121
November 3	6:00 p.m.	No. 17 Houston^{†}	Gerald J. Ford Stadium; Dallas, TX (rivalry)	ESPNU	W 45–31	23,654
November 10	11:00 a.m.	at UConn	Rentschler Field; East Hartford, CT	ESPN3	W 62–50	19,096
November 16	8:00 p.m.	Memphis	Gerald J. Ford Stadium; Dallas, TX	ESPN2	L 18–28	15,794
November 24	2:30 p.m.	at Tulsa	Chapman Stadium; Tulsa, OK	CBSSN	L 24–27	17,159
*Non-conference game; ^{†}Homecoming; Rankings from AP Poll released prior to the game; All times are in Central time

Schedule source:

== Roster ==
2018 SMU Mustangs football team roster
Players
Coaches
Offense

Pos.	#	Name	Class
WR	1	C. J. Sanders	Sr
RB	2	Ke'Mon Freeman	Jr
WR	3	James Proche	Jr
WR	4	Tyler Page	So
RB	5	Xavier Jones	Jr
RB	6	Braeden West	Sr
WR	7	Brandon Benson	So
QB	8	Ben Hicks	Jr
QB	9	William Brown	Fr
WR	10	Armanii Glaspie	Jr
WR	11	Jared Miles	Fr
QB	12	Derek Green	Fr
RB	13	TaMerik Williams	Fr
TE	14	Ryan Becker	Jr
QB	16	Christian McAnalley	Fr
QB	17	Austin Upshaw	Fr
QB	18	Jacob Oehrlein	Fr
WR	20	Jordan Brooks-Wess	Fr
WR	21	Reggie Roberson, Jr.	So
WR	22	Myron Gailliard	Jr
RB	31	Merek Pierce	Jr
RB	43	J. R. Griffin	Jr
WR	44	James Sowards	Fr
WR	46	Matt Dorrity	Fr
OL	56	Harrison Barton	So
OL	57	Chad Pursley	Sr
OL	64	Bryce Wilds	Jr
OL	65	Jordan Gipson	Fr
OL	68	Nick Natour	Sr
OL	69	Jacob Todora	So
OL	70	Kadarius Smith	So
OL	71	Jaylon Thomas	Fr
OL	72	Nick Dennis	Jr
OL	74	Braxton Webb	So
OL	75	Hayden Howerton	So
OL	76	Levon Livingston	Jr
OL	77	Alan Ali	Fr
OL	78	Beau Morris	So
OL	79	Larry Hughes	Sr
TE	81	Ben Redding	Fr
TE	82	Corey Rau	So
TE	83	Kylen Granson	Jr
WR	84	Judah Bell	Fr
TE	85	Thomas Mallak	Fr
WR	86	Conner Allen	Fr
WR	88	Joshua Shelmire	So
TE	88	Hunter Thedford	Jr

Defense

Pos.	#	Name	Class
CB	1	Eric Sutton	Jr
S	2	Patrick Nelson	Jr
LB	3	Delano Robinson	So
S	4	Mikial Onu	Jr
CB	5	Ar’mani Johnson	Fr
S	6	Elijah McQueen	So
CB	7	Robert Hayes, Jr.	Jr
DB	8	Rodney Clemons	Jr
LB	9	Shaine Hailey	So
DT	10	Demerick Gary	Jr
DT	11	Shabazz Dotson	Fr
LB	11	Kyran Mitchell	Sr
CB	12	Kevin Johnson	Jr
CB	13	Jourdan Blake	Sr
LB	14	Richard Moore	Jr
CB	15	Treveon Johnson	Fr
LB	16	Trevor Denbow	So
LB	17	Jordon Williams	Jr
LB	18	William Jeanlys	Sr
S	20	Collin Rock	So
S	21	Cole Sterns	Sr
DE	22	Tyeson Neals	Jr
CB	23	Jordan Wyatt	Sr
LB	24	Jimmy Phillips Jr.	Fr
LB	25	Myles Duke	So
S	26	Brent Freeman	Sr
S	27	Michael Salerno	Fr
CB	28	Christian Davis	Jr
CB	29	Justin Guy-Robinson	So
LB	30	Kyle Blaskovich	Fr
LB	31	Preston Ellison	Fr
LB	32	J. C. Rispress	Fr
LB	33	Jordan Ward	Jr
S	34	Brice Madison	So
DE	35	Delontae Scott	Jr
CB	36	Terry Keys III	Fr
DE	38	Toby Ndukwe	Fr
DT	39	Darren Brown	Fr
LB	40	Noah Spears	So
CB	41	Pedro Duran Silva	Fr
S	42	Ra-Sun Kazadi	Fr
S	43	Brady McCanles	Fr
DT	44	Harrison Loveless	Fr
LB	46	Andrew Adams	Jr
S	46	Jackson Weaver	Fr
S	47	Zak Folts	Fr
DE	50	Paka Davis	Sr
DT	51	Pono Davis	Jr
DE	52	Gerrit Choate	So
DE	55	Gary Wiley	Fr
DT	72	Patrick Jones	So
DT	90	Ken McLaurin	So
DT	94	Chris Biggurs	Jr
DT	95	Jake Hall	Sr
DE	96	Noah Westerfield	Sr
DE	97	Turner Coxe	Fr

Special teams

Pos.	#	Name	Class
K	32	Jack Hansing	So
K	45	Will Moore	So
P	47	Jamie Sackville	Jr
LS	49	Cole Voyles	Fr
LS	53	Michael Sehlinger	Jr
LS	54	Garrett Stotts	Sr
K, P	89	Kevin Robledo	Jr
P	99	Warren Scott	Fr

Head coach

- Sonny Dykes (Texas Tech)

Coordinators/assistant coaches

- Kevin Kane (Kansas)
  Defensive coordinator/LB
- Rhett Lashlee (Texas Tech)
  Offensive coordinator/QB
- Josh Martin (Tarleton State)
  Tight ends/fullbacks
- Chris Brasfield (TCU)
  Running backs/recruiting coordinator/RB
- Kevin Curtis (Texas Tech)
  Cornerbacks
- David Gru (California)
  Wide receivers
- Trey Haverty (TCU)
  Safeties
- Randall Joyner (SMU)
  Defensive ends
- Jamal Powell (Texas A&M)
  Offensive line
- Jonathan Brewer (Arkansas)
  Offensive quality control/Offensive analyst

Legend

- (C) Team captain
- (S) Suspended
- (I) Ineligible
- Injured
- Redshirt

Roster

== Game summaries ==
=== At North Texas ===
SMU Mustangs at North Texas Mean Green

Quarter	1	2	3	4	Total
Mustangs	0	0	0	23	23
Mean Green	14	6	16	10	46

at Apogee Stadium • Denton, TX

- Date: September 1
- Game time: 6:30 p.m.
- Game weather: Temperature: 93 °F (34 °C) • Weather: partly cloudy • Wind: SE 12 MPH
- Game attendance: 29,519
- Referee: Tracy Jones
- TV announcers (Stadium): Chris Hassel (play-by-play), A. J. Hawk (color), Kristen Balboni (reporter)

Game information

First Quarter

- UNT – Jalen Guyton 15-yard pass from Mason Fine (Cole Hedlund kick), 8:34. Mean Green 7–0. Drive: 10 plays, 49 yards, 5:12.
- UNT – Kemon Hall 36-yard interception return (Cole Hedlund kick), 5:37. Mean Green 14–0.

Second Quarter

- UNT – Cole Hedlund 40-yard field goal, 11:47. Mean Green 17–0. Drive: 17 plays, 59 yards, 7:08.
- UNT – Cole Hedlund 18-yard field goal, 0:00. Mean Green 20–0. Drive: 15 plays, 93 yards, 5:22.

Third Quarter

- UNT – Nic Smith 5-yard pass from Mason Fine (Cole Hedlund kick), 11:17. Mean Green 27–0. Drive: 9 plays, 75 yards, 3:43.
- UNT – Jalen Guyton 17-yard pass from Mason Fine (two-point conversion failed), 6:04. Mean Green 33–0. Drive: 9 plays, 95 yards, 4:02.
- UNT – Cole Hedlund 41-yard field goal, 0:19. Mean Green 36–0. Drive: 10 plays, 52 yards, 4:13.

Fourth Quarter

- SMU – Braeden West 5-yard run (Will Moore kick), 8:11. Mean Green 36–7. Drive: 6 plays, 63 yards, 1:39.
- UNT – Cole Hedlund 51-yard field goal, 3:29. Mean Green 39–7. Drive: 8 plays, 40 yards, 4:42.
- SMU – James Proche 59-yard pass from Ben Hicks (Hicks to Roberson for two-point conversion), 1:41. Mean Green 39–15. Drive: 4 plays, 74 yards, 1:48.
- UNT – DeAndre Torrey 96-yard kick return (Cole Hedlund kick), 1:28. Mean Green 46–15.
- SMU – Braeden West 71-yard pass from Ben Hicks (Hicks to Proche for two-point conversion), 1:09. Mean Green 46–23. Drive: 1 play, 71 yards, 0:00.

Top Passers

- SMU – Ben Hicks – 12/24, 252 yards, 2 TD, INT
- UNT – Mason Fine – 40/50, 444 yards, 3 TD

Top Rushers

- SMU – Braeden West – 8 carries, 26 yards, TD
- UNT – Loren Easly – 12 carries, 31 yards

Top Receiving

- SMU – Braeden West – 3 receptions, 81 yards, TD
- UNT – Rico Bussey, Jr. – 9 receptions, 109 yards

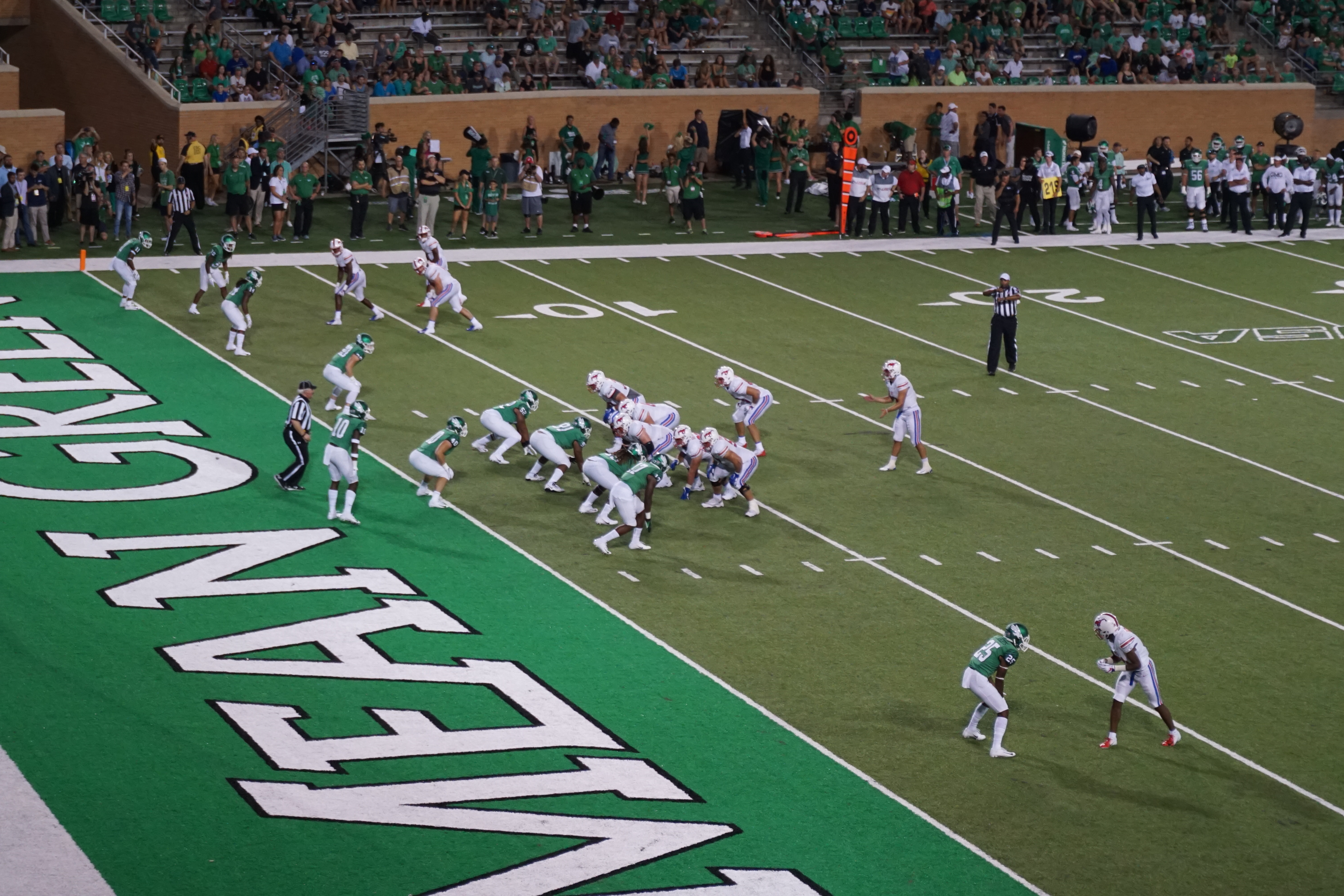
SMU in action against North Texas

To start the 2018 season, the Mustangs traveled to Denton, Texas to take on the Mean Green in the 38th Safeway Bowl.

SMU received the opening kickoff and started at their own 25-yard line. Ben Hicks completed a 6-yard pass to C. J. Sanders for the Mustangs' first offensive play. On the next play, SMU was backed up 5-yards after a false start penalty against Larry Hughes, making it 3rd and 9. On third down, Hicks was sacked by E.J. Ejiya for a 10-yard loss to bring up 4th and 19 and the Mustangs were forced to punt. Before the punt, SMU was backed up another 5-yards due to a delay of game penalty. Jaelon Darden received the punt for North Texas, returning it 4-yard to the SMU 49-yard line. Following a Mason Fine sack and an offensive holding penalty, the Mean Green were backed up to their own 49-yard line on 3rd and 25, but a personal foul against Trevor Denbow moved North Texas up to the SMU 36-yard line with an automatic first down. Three plays later, Mason Fine found Jalen Guyton for a 15-yard touchdown pass. The two teams punted on their next drives after both went three and out. On the first play following North Texas's punt, Hicks was intercepted by Kemon Hall who returned it 36-yard for a pick six touchdown. The Mustangs punted three more times before halftime, while the Mean Green punted once and scored six more points with Cole Hedlund making two field goals.

North Texas received the second half kickoff and started at their own 25-yard line. The Mean Green ended the drive with a 5-yard touchdown pass from Mason Fine to Nic Smith. The Mustangs punted on their next three drives, while North Texas scored another touchdown and made another field goal, extending the lead to 36–0. On their 4th drive of the game, the Mean Green turned the ball over on downs at the SMU 37-yard line. On the 5th play following the turnover on downs, Hicks found Jr. Robinson for a 37-yard pass, putting the Mustangs at the North Texas 5-yard line. On the next play, Braeden West found the end zone on a 5-yard run, giving SMU its first score of the game. On the next drive, Hedlund made a 51-yard field goal to make it 39–7. On the kickoff, Sanders returned the kick 23-yards to the SMU 26-yard line. On the 4th play of the drive, Hicks found James Proche for a 59-yard touchdown pass; the Mustangs made the two-point conversion to trail 15–39 with 1:41 left to play. On the following kickoff, DeAndre Torrey returned Kevin Roblebo's kick 96-yards for a touchdown. On the next drive, Hicks made another long touchdown pass, this time a 71-yard pass to West. Receiving the ball back, the Mean Green took a knee to end the game.

The Mustangs' offense was shutout through the first three quarters, getting their first score of the game on a five-yard run from Braeden West with just over 8 minutes left in the game. SMU only had 256 yards of total offense, while North Texas had 529. SMU's defense couldn't stop Mean Green quarterback Mason Fine, who threw for 444 yards and 3 touchdowns.

=== TCU ===
#16 TCU Horned Frogs at SMU Mustangs

Quarter	1	2	3	4	Total
No. 16 Horned Frogs	0	14	14	14	42
Mustangs	9	3	0	0	12

at Gerald J. Ford Stadium • Dallas, TX

- Date: September 7
- Game time: 7:00 p.m.
- Game weather: Temperature: 75 °F (24 °C) • Weather: steady rain • Wind: N 8 MPH
- Game attendance: 24,216
- Referee: Brandon Cruse
- TV announcers (ESPN2): Clay Matvick (play-by-play), Dan Orlovsky (color), Paul Carcaterra (reporter)

Game information

First Quarter

- SMU – Braeden West 51-yard run (Will Moore kick), 13:10. Mustangs 7–0. Drive: 5 plays, 75 yards, 1:50.
- SMU – Adam Nunez fumble, 5:00. Mustangs 9–0. Drive: 6 plays, -10 yards, 1:03.

Second Quarter

- TCU – KaVontae Turpin 78-yard punt return (Cole Bunce kick), 12:34. Mustangs 9–7.
- TCU – Jaelan Austin fumble recovery (Cole Bunce kick), 8:13. Horned Frogs 14–9. Drive: 6 plays, 70 yards, 2:27.
- SMU – Kevin Robledo 49-yard field goal, 0:00. Horned Frogs 14–12. Drive: 10 plays, 31 yards, 1:43.

Third Quarter

- TCU – Alec Dunham 25-yard fumble return (Cole Bunce kick), 10:50. Horned Frogs 21–12.
- TCU – Shawn Robinson 18-yard run (Cole Bunce kick), 7:28. Horned Frogs 28–12. Drive: 3 plays, 44 yards, 1:51.

Fourth Quarter

- TCU – KaVontae Turpin 42-yard pass from Shawn Robinson (Cole Bunce kick), 14:06. Horned Frogs 35–12. Drive: 3 plays, 49 yards, 1:29.
- TCU – Michael Collins 10-yard run (Cole Bunce kick), 6:47. Horned Frogs 42–12. Drive: 2 plays, 15 yards, 0:49.

Top Passers

- TCU – Shawn Robinson – 15/28, 146 yards, TD, INT
- SMU – Ben Hicks – 18/38, 111 yards

Top Rushers

- TCU – Darius Anderson – 9 carries, 69 yards
- SMU – Braeden West – 11 carries, 78 yards, TD

Top Receiving

- TCU – KaVontae Turpin – 4 receptions, 64 yards, TD
- SMU – James Proche – 6 receptions, 50 yards

Kickoff was scheduled for 7:00 p.m., but was delayed due to lightning in the area. The delay lasted for nearly 2 hours, with kickoff happening at 8:59 p.m.

The Mustangs received the opening kickoff, starting at their own 25-yard line. Following a 10-yard run, quarterback Ben Hicks had to sit out a play after losing his helmet. On the following play, running back Braeden West went 51-yards for a touchdown to take an early 7–0 lead following Will Moore's kick. The Horned Frogs started the following drive at their own 30-yard line. TCU made it to their own 45-yard line, but quarterback Shawn Robinson fumbled the ball on a play for a loss of 2-yards following the recovery. On 3rd and 14 at the TCU 41, Robinson threw an incomplete pass that was almost intercepted. Reggie Roberson Jr. returned Adam Nunez's punt to the TCU 10-yard line, but an illegal block in the back against SMU forced the offense to start at their own 25-yard line. Making it to the TCU 41-yard line, Hicks was sacked on 3rd and 10, forcing the Mustangs to punt. The Horned Frogs started their next drive at their own 10-yard line. TCU made it 18-yards to the 28-yard line, but were forced to punt. On the punt, Nunez fumbled the ball, with the ball rolling out of the end zone for a safety. Following the safety, the Mustangs' next drive ended in a punt. The Horned Frogs started at their own 2-yard line, making it to the SMU 31-yard line. On 4th and 7, TCU kicker Cole Bunce missed a 48-yard field goal, with the ball bouncing off of the center post. TCU got its first touchdown of the game in the 2nd quarter with a 78-yard punt return from KaVontae Turpin. The Horned Frogs scored on their next drive when running back Sewo Olonilua ran the ball 24-yards, but fumbled; the fumble was recovered in the end zone by Jaelan Austin for a touchdown, giving TCU its first lead of the game. To close out the first half, SMU kicker Kevin Robledo made a 49-yard field goal.

TCU received the second half kickoff and made it all the way to the SMU 24-yard line, but a Robinson pass was intercepted by Shaine Hailey. On the second play of the next drive, Hicks fumbled the football, which was recovered by Alec Dunham, who returned it 25-yards for a touchdown. The Horned Frogs continued to extend their lead on their next offensive drive, with Robinson running 18-yards for a touchdown. The Mustangs failed to score in the second half, while the Horned Frogs scored 28 points.

SMU only had 242 yards of total offense, while TCU had 387. The Horned Frogs turned the ball over twice, while the Mustangs only committed one turnover.

=== At Michigan ===
SMU Mustangs at #19 Michigan Wolverines

Quarter	1	2	3	4	Total
Mustangs	0	7	6	7	20
No. 19 Wolverines	0	21	14	10	45

at Michigan Stadium • Ann Arbor, MI

- Date: September 15
- Game time: 2:30 p.m.
- Game weather: Temperature: 85 °F (29 °C) • Weather: partly cloudy • Wind: NE 5 MPH
- Game attendance: 110,549
- Referee: Larry Smith
- TV announcers (BTN): Kevin Kugler (play-by-play), Matt Millen (color)

Game information

First Quarter

- No scoring plays

Second Quarter

- MICH – Ben Mason 1-yard run (Quinn Nordin kick), 6:56. Wolverines 7–0. Drive: 11 plays, 57 yards, 6:25.
- SMU – James Proche 50-yard pass from Ben Hicks (Will Moore kick), 5:16. Tied 7–7. Drive: 5 plays, 75 yards, 1:40.
- MICH – Donovan Peoples-Jones 35-yard pass from Shea Patterson (Quinn Nordin kick), 2:34. Wolverines 14–7. Drive: 5 plays, 60 yards, 2:42.
- MICH – Josh Metellus 73-yard interception return (Quinn Nordin kick), 0:00. Wolverines 21–7.

Third Quarter

- MICH – Donovan Peoples-Jones 7-yard pass from Shea Patterson (Quinn Nordin kick), 9:07. Wolverines 28–7. Drive: 8 plays, 62 yards, 4:48.
- SMU – Ryan Becker 2-yard pass from William Brown (Will Moore PAT failed), 1:36. Wolverines 28–13. Drive: 16 plays, 87 yards, 7:31.
- MICH – Donovan Peoples-Jones 41-yard pass from Shea Patterson (Quinn Nordin kick), 1:23. Wolverines 35–13. Drive: 2 plays, 41 yards, 0:13.

Fourth Quarter

- SMU – James Proche 2-yard pass from William Brown (Will Moore kick), 10:43. Wolverines 35–20. Drive: 12 plays, 80 yards, 5:40.
- MICH – Quinn Nordin 45-yard field goal, 8:03. Wolverines 38–20. Drive: 6 plays, 48 yards, 2:40.
- MICH – Tru Wilson 9-yard run (Quinn Nordin kick), 1:05. Wolverines 45–20. Drive: 8 plays, 68 yards, 5:08.

Top Passers

- SMU – Ben Hicks – 7/16, 113 yards, TD, INT
- MICH – Shea Patterson – 14/18, 237 yards, 3 TD, INT

Top Rushers

- SMU – Xavier Jones – 13 carries, 50 yards
- MICH – Chris Evans – 18 carries, 85 yards

Top Receiving

- SMU – James Proche – 11 receptions, 166 yards, 2 TD
- MICH – Zach Gentry – 4 receptions, 95 yards

=== Navy ===
Navy Midshipmen at SMU Mustangs

Quarter	1	2	3	4	OT	Total
Midshipmen	0	7	7	9	7	30
Mustangs	3	7	7	6	8	31

at Gerald J. Ford Stadium • Dallas, TX

- Date: September 22
- Game time: 11:00 a.m.
- Game weather: Temperature: 75 °F (24 °C) • Weather: light rain • Wind: E 5 MPH
- Game attendance: 17,531
- Referee: Adam Savoie
- TV announcers (ESPNews): Bill Roth (play-by-play), Mike Golic Jr. (color)

Game information

First Quarter

- SMU – Kevin Robledo 26-yard field goal, 9:37. Mustangs 3–0. Drive: 14 plays, 72 yards, 5:23.

Second Quarter

- NAVY – Zach Abey 1-yard run (Bennett Moehring kick), 13:10. Midshipmen 7–3. Drive: 18 plays, 78 yards, 11:21.
- SMU – Reggie Roberson, Jr. 20-yard pass from William Brown (Kevin Robledo kick), 4:36. Mustangs 10–7. Drive: 6 plays, 36 yards, 2:29.

Third Quarter

- NAVY – Mychal Cooper 25-yard pass from Garret Lewis (Bennett Moehring kick), 6:38. Midshipmen 14–10. Drive: 7 plays, 62 yards, 3:19.
- SMU – Reggie Roberson, Jr. 98-yard kick return (Kevin Robledo kick), 6:25. Mustangs 17–14.

Fourth Quarter

- SMU – Myron Galliard 2-yard from William Brown (PAT blocked), 12:25. Mustangs 23–14. Drive: 4 plays, 2 yards, 1:23.
- NAVY – Jarid Ryan defensive PAT, 12:25. Mustangs 23–16.
- NAVY – C.J. Williams 52-yard run (Bennett Moehring kick), 6:19. Tied 23–23. Drive: 5 plays, 81 yards, 2:06.

Overtime

- NAVY – Garret Lewis 1-yard run (Bennett Moehring kick). Midshipmen 30–23. Drive: 9 plays, 25 yards.
- SMU – James Proche 4-yard pass from Ben Hicks (Ben Hicks pass to Hunter Thedford for two-point conversion). Mustangs 31–30. Drive: 7 plays, 25 yards.

Top Passers

- NAVY – Garret Lewis – 1/3, 25 yards, TD
- SMU – William Brown – 21/29, 150 yards, 2 TD

Top Rushers

- NAVY – C.J. Williams – 6 carries, 82 yards, TD
- SMU – Braeden West – 26 carries, 145 yards

Top Receiving

- NAVY – Mychal Cooper – 1 reception, 25 yards, TD
- SMU – James Proche – 9 receptions, 64 yards, TD

=== Houston Baptist ===
Houston Baptist Huskies at SMU Mustangs

Quarter	1	2	3	4	Total
Huskies	3	7	10	7	27
Mustangs	21	14	14	14	63

at Gerald J. Ford Stadium • Dallas, TX

- Date: September 29
- Game time: 6:00 p.m.
- Game weather: Temperature: 78 °F (26 °C) • Weather: mostly cloudy • Wind: ESE 9 MPH
- Game attendance: 18,983
- Referee: Charles Lewis
- TV announcers (ESPN3): Drew Fellios (play-by-play), Forrest Conoly (color)

Game information

First Quarter

- SMU – Jared Miles 20-yard run (Kevin Robledo kick), 10:15. Mustangs 7–0. Drive: 6 plays, 64 yards, 2:12.
- SMU – Tyler Page 92-yard pass from William Brown (Kevin Robledo kick), 8:09. Mustangs 14–0. Drive: 2 plays, 94 yards, 0:38.'
- HBU – Alec Chadwick 35-yard field goal, 3:35. Mustangs 14–3. Drive: 8 plays, 24 yards, 2:31.
- SMU – James Proche 20-yard pass from William Brown (Kevin Robledo kick), 1:39. Mustangs 21–3. Drive: 5 plays, 64 yards, 1:48.

Second Quarter

- SMU – Braeden West 25-yard run (Kevin Robledo kick), 6:55. Mustangs 28–3. Drive: 7 plays, 60 yards, 2:33.
- HBU – LaDarius Dickens 95-yard kick return (Alec Chadwick kick), 6:41. Mustangs 28–10.
- SMU – Ben Redding 4-yard pass from Jamie Sackville (Kevin Robledo kick), 0:00. Mustangs 35–10. Drive: 8 plays, 92 yards, 2:56.

Third Quarter

- SMU – Braeden West 11-yard run (Kevin Robledo kick), 8:20. Mustangs 42–10. Drive: 10 plays, 80 yards, 3:30.
- HBU – Trevor Larkin 8-yard pass from Bailey Zappe (Alec Chadwick kick), 5:43. Mustangs 42–17. Drive: 12 plays, 65 yards, 2:37.
- SMU – Judah Bell 9-yard pass from Ben Hicks (Kevin Robledo kick), 2:58. Mustangs 49–17. Drive: 7 plays, 55 yards, 2:36.
- HBU – Alec Chadwick 29-yard field goal, 0:22. Mustangs 49–20. Drive: 8 plays, 53 yards, 2:36.

Fourth Quarter

- SMU – J.R. Griffith 1-yard run (Kevin Robledo kick), 12:18. Mustangs 56–20. Drive: 9 plays, 62 yards, 2:57.
- HBU – Jarreth Sterns 7-yard pass from Bailey Zappe (Alec Chadwick kick), 8:22. Mustangs 56–27. Drive: 10 plays, 75 yards, 3:56.
- SMU – Austin Upshaw 1-yard run (Kevin Robledo kick), 7:19. Mustangs 63–27. Drive: 3 plays, 12 yards, 0:49.

Top Passers

- HBU – Bailey Zappe – 27/50, 226 yards, 2 TD, INT
- SMU – William Brown – 12/20, 309 yards, 2 TD, INT

Top Rushers

- HBU – Dreshawn Minnieweather – 7 carries, 26 yards
- SMU – Braeden West – 12 carries, 69 yards, 2 TD

Top Receiving

- HBU – Nick Sexton – 5 receptions, 39 yards
- SMU – Reggie Roberson Jr. – 4 receptions, 104 yards

=== At UCF ===
SMU Mustangs at #12 UCF Golden Knights

Quarter	1	2	3	4	Total
Mustangs	3	7	3	7	20
No. 12 Knights	21	6	7	14	48

at Spectrum Stadium • Orlando, FL

- Date: October 6
- Game time: 6:00 p.m.
- Game weather: Temperature: 83 °F (28 °C) • Weather: mostly clear • Wind: E 10 MPH
- Game attendance: 40,856
- Referee: Charles Lamerti
- TV: ESPNU

Game information

First Quarter

- SMU – Kevin Robledo 31-yard field goal, 10:30. Mustangs 3–0. Drive: 12 plays, 62 yards, 4:30.
- UCF – Adrian Killins Jr. 15-yard run (Matthew Wright kick), 7:32. Knights 7–3. Drive: 9 plays, 65 yards, 2:58.
- UCF – Dredrick Snelson 14-yard pass from McKenzie Milton (Matthew Wright kick), 6:47. Knights 14–3. Drive: 3 plays, 18 yards, 0:45.
- UCF – Otis Anderson 4-yard run (Matthew Wright kick), 2:55. Knights 21–3. Drive: 7 plays, 70 yards, 1:58.

Second Quarter

- SMU – James Proche 5-yard pass from Ben Hicks (Kevin Robledo kick), 8:34. Knights 21–10. Drive: 3 plays, 9 yards, 1:07.
- UCF – Matthew Wright 45-yard field goal, 3:32. Knights 24–10. Drive: 13 plays, 47 yards, 5:11.
- UCF – Matthew Wright 34-yard field goal, 0:00. Knights 27–10. Drive: 10 plays, 63 yards, 2:21.

Third Quarter

- UCF – Trysten Hill 1-yard run (Matthew Wright kick), 11:16. Knights 34–10. Drive: 11 plays, 88 yards, 3:44.
- SMU – Kevin Robledo 21-yard field goal, 6:09. Knights 34–13. Drive: 11 plays, 57 yards, 5:07.

Fourth Quarter

- UCF – Tre Nixon 30-yard pass from McKenzie Milton (Matthew Wright kick), 14:54. Knights 41–13. Drive: 5 plays, 48 yards, 0:55.
- UCF – Otis Anderson 30-yard run (Matthew Wright kick), 9:55. Knights 48–13. Drive: 7 plays, 81 yards, 1:58.
- SMU – James Proche 19-yard pass from William Brown (Kevin Robledo kick), 0:36. Knights 48–20. Drive: 16 plays, 80 yards, 5:36.

Top Passers

- SMU – Ben Hicks – 15/23, 153 yards, TD
- UCF – McKenzie Milton – 18/34, 278 yards, 2 TD, INT

Top Rushers

- SMU – Braeden West – 17 carries, 69 yards
- UCF – Adrian Killins Jr. – 20 carries, 113 yards, TD

Top Receiving

- SMU – James Proche – 12 receptions, 100 yards, 2 TD
- UCF – Tre Nixon – 6 receptions, 97 yards, TD

=== At Tulane ===
SMU Mustangs at Tulane Green Wave

Quarter	1	2	3	4	Total
Mustangs	0	7	7	13	27
Green Wave	2	7	7	7	23

at Yulman Stadium • New Orleans, LA

- Date: October 20
- Game time: 2:30 p.m.
- Game weather: Temperature: 85 °F (29 °C) • Weather: rain • Wind: NW 6 MPH
- Game attendance: 13,987
- Referee: Riley Johnson
- TV: ESPNU

Game information

First Quarter

- TULN – SMU team safety, 3:47. Green Wave 2–0.

Second Quarter

- TULN – Darius Bradwell 10-yard run (Merek Glover kick), 14:55. Green Wave 9–0. Drive: 8 plays, 79 yards, 3:47.
- SMU – Xavier Jones 55-yard pass from Ben Hicks (Kevin Robledo kick), 11:38. Green Wave 9–7. Drive: 7 plays, 75 yards, 3:17.

Third Quarter

- TULN – Donnie Lewis Jr. 49-yard interception return (Merek Glover kick), 13:05. Green Wave 16–7.
- SMU – Reggie Roberson Jr. 16-yard pass from Ben Hicks (Kevin Robledo kick), 8:08. Green Wave 16–14. Drive: 9 plays, 58 yards, 4:48.

Fourth Quarter

- TULN – Jonathan Banks 3-yard run (Merek Glover kick), 12:58. Green Wave 23–14. Drive: 12 plays, 89 yards, 6:20.
- SMU – Braeden West 29-yard run (Kevin Robledo kick), 11:29. Green Wave 23–21. Drive: 6 plays, 75 yards, 1:29.
- SMU – James Proche 67-yard pass from Ben Hicks (two-point conversion failed), 1:15. Mustangs 27–23. Drive: 2 plays, 62 yards, 0:16.

Top Passers

- SMU – Ben Hicks – 21/40, 291 yards, 3 TD, INT
- TULN – Jonathan Banks – 14/22, 153 yards, INT

Top Rushers

- SMU – Braeden West – 12 carries, 51 yards, TD
- TULN – Darius Bradwell – 13 carries, 72 yards, TD

Top Receiving

- SMU – Reggie Roberson Jr. – 7 receptions, 99 yards, TD
- TULN – Terren Encalade – 4 receptions, 39 yards

=== Cincinnati ===
Cincinnati Bearcats at SMU Mustangs

Quarter	1	2	3	4	OT	Total
Bearcats	7	0	10	3	6	26
Mustangs	7	0	7	6	0	20

at Gerald J. Ford Stadium • Dallas, TX

- Date: October 27
- Game time: 2:30 p.m.
- Game weather: Temperature: 80 °F (27 °C) • Weather: sunny • Wind: WNW 5 MPH
- Game attendance: 16,121
- Referee: Adam Sovoie
- TV: CBSSN

Game information

First Quarter

- CIN – Khalil Lewis 32-yard pass from Desmond Ridder (Cole Smith kick), 13:37. Bearcats 7–0. Drive: 4 plays, 74 yards, 1:23.
- SMU – Reggie Roberson Jr. 8-yard pass from Ben Hicks (Kevin Robledo kick), 11:46. Tied 7–7. Drive: 1 play, 8 yards, 0:06.

Second Quarter

- No scoring plays

Third Quarter

- CIN – Khalil Lewis 32-yard pass from Desmond Ridder (Cole Smith kick), 13:13. Bearcats 14–7. Drive: 3 plays, 32 yards, 0:17.
- CIN – Cole Smith 24-yard field goal, 6:37. Bearcats 17–7. Drive: 10 plays, 68 yards, 5:03.
- SMU – Reggie Roberson Jr. 22-yard pass from Ben Hicks (Kevin Robledo kick), 4:05. Bearcats 17–14. Drive: 7 plays, 82 yards, 2:25.

Fourth Quarter

- SMU – Kevin Robledo 20-yard field goal, 12:46. Tied 17–17. Drive: 10 plays, 79 yards, 3:21.
- SMU – Kevin Robledo 36-yard field goal, 4:23. Mustangs 20–17. Drive: 10 plays, 49 yards, 3:26.
- CIN – Cole Smith 41-yard field goal, 0:00. Tied 20–20. Drive: 13 plays, 56 yards, 1:21.

Overtime

- CIN – James Wiggins 86-yard interception return. Bearcats 26–20.

Top Passers

- CIN – Desmond Ridder – 33/50, 352 yards, 2 TD, 2 INT
- SMU – Ben Hicks – 22/43, 328 yards, 2 TD, INT

Top Rushers

- CIN – Michael Warren II – 14 carries, 67 yards
- SMU – Braedon West – 11 carries, 16 yards

Top Receiving

- CIN – Khalil Lewis – 12 receptions, 174 yards, 2 TD
- SMU – Reggie Roberson Jr. – 7 receptions, 147 yards, 2 TD

=== Houston ===
Houston Cougars at SMU Mustang

Quarter	1	2	3	4	Total
No. 17 Cougars	0	14	3	14	31
Mustangs	10	21	7	7	45

at Gerald J. Ford Stadium • Dallas, TX

- Date: November 3
- Game time: 6:00 p.m.
- Game weather: Temperature: 72 °F (22 °C) • Wind: S 17 MPH • Weather: mostly cloudy
- Game attendance: 23,654
- Referee: C. Lamertina
- TV: ESPNU

Game information

First Quarter

Second Quarter

Third Quarter

Fourth Quarter

Top Passers

- HOU – D'Eriq King – 11/22, 175 yards, 2 TD
- SMU – Ben Hicks – 28/43, 318 yards, 4 TD

Top Rushers

- HOU – Patrick Carr – 17 carries, 75 yards
- SMU – Ke'Mon Freeman – 20 carries, 107 yards, 2 TD

Top Receiving

- HOU – Marquez Stevenson – 3 receptions, 104 yards, TD
- SMU – Reggie Roberson Jr. – 9 receptions, 134 yards, TD

=== At UConn ===
SMU Mustangs at UConn Huskies

Quarter	1	2	3	4	Total
Mustangs	17	14	14	17	62
Huskies	7	3	14	26	50

at Rentschler Field • East Hartford, CT

- Date: November 10
- Game time: 11:00 a.m.
- Game weather: Temperature: 45 °F (7 °C) • Wind: W 16 MPH • Weather: sunny and windy
- Game attendance: 19,096
- Referee: A. Calabrese
- TV: ESPN3

Game information

First Quarter

- SMU – Kevin Robledo 39-yard field goal, 11:31. Mustangs 3–0. Drive: 11 plays, 53 yards, 3:29.
- SMU – Ke'Mon Freeman 39-yard run (Kevin Robledo kick), 7:24. Mustangs 10–0. Drive: 6 plays, 82 yards, 2:11.
- UCONN – David Pindell 30-yard run (Michael Tarbutt kick), 4:38. Mustangs 10–7. Drive: 7 plays, 75 yards, 2:46.
- SMU – Ke'Mon Freeman 5-yard run (Kevin Robledo kick), 3:10. Mustangs 17–7. Drive: 5 plays, 76 yards, 1:28.

Second Quarter

- SMU – Ryan Becker 3-yard pass from Tyler Page (Kevin Robledo kick), 11:15. Mustangs 24–7. Drive: 11 plays, 72 yards, 3:49.
- UCONN – Michael Tarbutt 45-yard field goal, 8:33. Mustangs 24–10. Drive: 5 plays, 47 yards, 2:42.
- SMU – Braeden West 6-yard run (Kevin Robledo kick), 7:36. Mustangs 31–10. Drive: 3 plays, 55 yards, 0:57.

Third Quarter

- UCONN – Hergy Mayala 22-yard pass from David Pindell (Michael Tarbutt kick), 11:10. Mustangs 31–17. Drive: 9 plays, 81 yards, 3:50.
- SMU – Xavier Jones 52-yard run (Kevin Robledo kick), 10:40. Mustangs 38–17. Drive: 2 plays, 70 yards, 0:30.
- UCONN – Kyle Buss 15-yard pass from David Pindell (Michael Tarbutt kick), 6:50. Mustangs 38–24. Drive: 8 plays, 73 yards, 3:50.
- SMU – Reggie Roberson Jr. 6-yard pass from Ben Hicks (Kevin Robledo kick), 3:54. Mustangs 45–24. Drive: 11 plays, 75 yards, 2:56.

Fourth Quarter

- UCONN – Tyler Davis 5-yard pass from David Pindell (Michael Tarbutt kick), 14:57. Mustangs 45–31. Drive: 11 plays, 75 yards, 3:57.
- SMU – Xavier Jones 43-yard run (Kevin Robledo kick), 14:48. Mustangs 52–31. Drive: 1 play, 43 yards, 0:09.
- UCONN – David Pindell 48-yard run (PAT blocked), 13:41. Mustangs 52–37. Drive: 3 plays, 65 yards, 1:07.
- UCONN – Kevin Mensah 19-yard run (Michael Tarbutt kick), 10:18. Mustangs 52–44. Drive: 5 plays, 59 yards, 1:58.
- SMU – Ke'Mon Freeman 3-yard run (Kevin Robledo kick), 8:55. Mustangs 59–44. Drive: 4 plays, 62 yards, 1:23.
- SMU – Kevin Robledo 30-yard field goal, 3:35. Mustangs 62–44. Drive: 7 plays, 36 yards, 3:45.
- UCONN – Hergy Mayala 14-yard pass from David Pindell (pass failed), 0:36. Mustangs 62–50. Drive: 9 plays, 40 yards, 1:20.

Top Passers

- SMU – Ben Hicks – 19/29, 276 yards, TD
- UCONN – David Pindell – 25/38, 215 yards, 4 TD, INT

Top Rushers

- SMU – Xavier Jones – 11 carries, 133 yards, 2 TD
- UCONN – David Pindell – 21 carries, 184 yards, 2 TD

Top Receiving

- SMU – James Proche – 6 receptions, 101 yards
- UCONN – Aaron McLean – 7 receptions, 82 yards

=== Memphis ===
Memphis Tigers at SMU Mustangs

Quarter	1	2	3	4	Total
Tigers	0	7	7	14	28
Mustangs	3	2	7	6	18

at Gerald J. Ford Stadium • Dallas, TX

- Date: November 16
- Game time: 8:00 p.m.
- TV announcers (ESPN2): John Congemi, Anish Shroff, Roddy Jones

Game information

First Quarter

- SMU – Kevin Robledo 21-yard field goal, 0:22. Mustangs 3–0. Drive: 10 plays, 63 yards, 3:42.

Second Quarter

- MEM – Joey Magnifico 16-yard pass from Brady White (Riley Patterson kick), 9:26. Tigers 7–3. Drive: 3 plays, 21 yards, 1:06.
- SMU – Patrick Taylor Jr. -5-yard run, 2:00. Tigers 7–5. Drive: 3 plays, -7 yards, 0:35.

Third Quarter

- MEM – Patrick Taylor Jr. 9-yard run (Riley Patterson kick), 10:14. Tigers 14–5. Drive: 5 plays, 65 yards, 1:55.
- SMU – James Proche 31-yard pass from Ben Hicks (Kevin Robledo kick), 1:22. Tigers 14–12. Drive: 5 plays, 47 yards, 0:54.

Fourth Quarter

- MEM – Joey Magnifico 9-yard pass from Brady White (Riley Patterson kick), 13:19. Tigers 21–12. Drive: 9 plays, 63 yards, 3:03.
- MEM – Patrick Taylor Jr. 2-yard run (Riley Patterson kick), 8:44. Tigers 28–12. Drive: 6 plays, 53 yards, 2:32.
- SMU – James Proche 2-yard pass from Ben Hicks (pass failed), 6:14. Tigers 28–18. Drive: 5 plays, 75 yards, 2:30.

Top Passers

- MEM – Brady White – 18/31, 226 yards, 2 TD, 2 INT
- SMU – Ben Hicks – 29/55, 344 yards, 2 TD, INT

Top Rushers

- MEM – Patrick Taylor Jr. – 20 carries, 111 yards, 2 TD
- SMU – Braeden West – 10 carries, 20 yards

Top Receiving

- MEM – Damonte Coxie – 2 receptions, 90 yards
- SMU – James Proche – 12 receptions, 134 yards, 2 TD

=== At Tulsa ===
SMU Mustangs at Tulsa Golden Hurricane

Quarter	1	2	3	4	Total
Mustangs	0	7	7	10	24
Golden Hurricane	7	14	3	3	27

at Chapman Stadium • Tulsa, OK

- Date: November 24

Game information

First Quarter

Second Quarter

Third Quarter

Fourth Quarter

Top Passers

- SMU –
- TLSA –

Top Rushers

- SMU –
- TLSA –

Top Receiving

- SMU –
- TLSA –
