= 2018 Memphis Tigers football team =

American college football season

2018 Memphis Tigers football

AAC West Division co-champion

American Athletic Championship Game L 41–56 vs. UCF

Birmingham Bowl, L 34–37 vs. Wake Forest
- Conference: American Athletic Conference
- West Division
- Record: 8–6 (5–3 American)
- Head coach: Mike Norvell (3rd season)
- Offensive coordinator: Kenny Dillingham (1st season)
- Offensive scheme: Spread
- Defensive coordinator: Chris Ball (3rd season)
- Base defense: Multiple
- Home stadium: Liberty Bowl Memorial Stadium

2018 American Athletic Conference football standings
	Conf.			Overall
Team	W		L	W		L
East Division
No. 11 UCF x$	8	–	0	12	–	1
Temple	7	–	1	8	–	5
No. 24 Cincinnati	6	–	2	11	–	2
South Florida	3	–	5	7	–	6
East Carolina	1	–	7	3	–	9
UConn	0	–	8	1	–	11
West Division
Memphis xy	5	–	3	8	–	6
Houston x	5	–	3	8	–	5
Tulane x	5	–	3	7	–	6
SMU	4	–	4	5	–	7
Navy	2	–	6	3	–	10
Tulsa	2	–	6	3	–	9
Championship: UCF 56, Memphis 41
$ – Conference champion; x – Division champion/co-champions; y – Championship game participant; Rankings from AP Poll

The 2018 Memphis Tigers football team represented the University of Memphis in the 2018 NCAA Division I FBS football season. The Tigers played their home games at the Liberty Bowl Memorial Stadium in Memphis, Tennessee and competed in the West Division of the American Athletic Conference. They were led by third-year head coach Mike Norvell. They finished the season 8–6, 5–3 in AAC to finish in a three-way tie for the West Division championship. After tie-breakers, they represented the West Division in the AAC Championship Game where they lost to East Division champion UCF. They were invited to the Birmingham Bowl where they lost to Wake Forest.

== Preseason ==
=== Award watch lists ===
Listed in the order that they were released

Award	Player	Position	Year
Rimington Trophy	Drew Kyser	C	SR
Chuck Bednarik Award	Curtis Akins	LB	SR
Maxwell Award	Darrell Henderson	RB	JR
Maxwell Award	Tony Pollard	RB	JR
Doak Walker Award	Darrell Henderson	RB	JR
John Mackey Award	Joey Magnifico	TE	JR
Butkus Award	Curtis Akins	LB	JR
Jim Thorpe Award	T. J. Carter	DB	SO
Bronko Nagurski Trophy	T. J. Carter	DB	SO
Outland Trophy	Trevon Tate	OL	SR
Paul Hornung Award	Tony Pollard	RB/KR	JR
Wuerffel Trophy	Patrick Taylor	RB	JR
Walter Camp Award	Darrell Henderson	RB	JR
Johnny Unitas Golden Arm Award	Brady White	QB	JR
Earl Campbell Tyler Rose Award	Patrick Taylor	RB	JR

=== AAC media poll ===
The AAC media poll was released on July 24, 2018, with the Tigers predicted to win the AAC West Division.

Media poll (West)
Predicted finish	Team	Votes (1st place)
1	Memphis	171 (23)
2	Houston	146 (4)
3	Navy	129 (3)
4	SMU	72
5	Tulane	68
6	Tulsa	44

== Personnel ==
=== Depth chart ===
Defense

FS
La'Andre Thomas
Sanchez Blake Jr.

WLB	MLB	SLB
J. J. Russell	Cade Mashburn	Austin Hall
Tim Hart	Jaylon Allen	Thomas Pickens; Nehemiah Augustus

SS
Tyrez Lindsey
Josh Perry

CB
T. J. Carter
Jacobi Francis

DE	DT	DT	DE
Carlito Gonzalez	Ross Anderson	Emmanuel Cooper	Jonathan Wilson
Chris Claybrooks	Noah Arrindell	Khalil Johnson	Joseph Dorceus

CB
Tito Windham
Tamaurice Smith
Tim Gordon

Offense

"X" WR
John Williams
Kedarian Jones

"Z" WR
Sam Craft
Mechand Slade

LT	LG	C	RG	RT
Trevon Tate	Dylan Parham	Drew Kyser	Dustin Woodard	Roger Joseph
Obinna Eze	Manuel Orona-Lopez	Issac Ellis	Brytain Peddy; Titus Jones	Scottie Dill

"Y" TE
Joey Magnifico
Sean Dykes
Tyce Daniel

"S" WR
Damonte Coxie
Antonio Gibson
Tre'Von Hamilton

QB
Brady White
Brady McBride
Connor Adair

RB
Darrell Henderson
Patrick Taylor

Tony Pollard

Special teams
PK Riley Patterson
PK Mike Kroeze
P Adam Williams
P Mike Kroeze
KR Tony Pollard
Darrell Henderson
PR John Williams
T. J. Carter
H Preston Brady

== Schedule ==
Date	Time	Opponent	Site	TV	Result	Attendance
September 1	6:00 p.m.	Mercer*	Liberty Bowl Memorial Stadium; Memphis, TN	ESPN3	W 66–14	33,697
September 8	2:30 p.m.	at Navy	Navy–Marine Corps Memorial Stadium; Annapolis, MD	CBSSN	L 21–22	31,762
September 14	7:00 p.m.	Georgia State*	Liberty Bowl Memorial Stadium; Memphis, TN	ESPN	W 59–22	27,678
September 22	7:00 p.m.	South Alabama*	Liberty Bowl Memorial Stadium; Memphis, TN	WMC	W 52–35	27,765
September 28	7:00 p.m.	at Tulane	Yulman Stadium; New Orleans, LA	ESPN2	L 24–40	16,631
October 6	6:00 p.m.	UConn	Liberty Bowl Memorial Stadium; Memphis, TN	CBSSN	W 55–14	27,581
October 13	2:30 p.m.	No. 10 UCF	Liberty Bowl Memorial Stadium; Memphis, TN	ABC/ESPN2	L 30–31	38,831
October 20	3:00 p.m.	at Missouri*	Faurot Field; Columbia, MO	SECN	L 33–65	52,917
November 3	11:00 a.m.	at East Carolina	Dowdy–Ficklen Stadium; Greenville, NC	ESPNU	W 59–41	29,127
November 10	11:00 a.m.	Tulsa	Liberty Bowl Memorial Stadium; Memphis, TN	ESPNU	W 47–21	27,905
November 16	8:00 p.m.	at SMU	Gerald J. Ford Stadium; Dallas, TX	ESPN2	W 28–18	15,794
November 23	11:00 a.m.	Houston	Liberty Bowl Memorial Stadium; Memphis, TN	ABC	W 52–31	27,790
December 1	2:30 p.m.	at No. 7 UCF	Spectrum Stadium; Orlando, FL (The American Championship)	ABC	L 41–56	45,176
December 22	11:00 a.m.	vs. Wake Forest*	Legion Field; Birmingham, AL (Birmingham Bowl)	ESPN	L 34–37	25,717
*Non-conference game; Rankings from AP Poll released prior to the game; All times are in Central time

== Game summaries ==
=== Mercer ===
	1	2	3	4	Total
Bears	0	0	0	14	14
Tigers	28	28	0	10	66

=== At Navy ===
	1	2	3	4	Total
Tigers	0	7	14	0	21
Midshipmen	3	6	0	13	22

=== Georgia State ===
	1	2	3	4	Total
Panthers	3	7	6	6	22
Tigers	21	17	7	14	59

=== South Alabama ===
	1	2	3	4	Total
Jaguars	7	14	6	8	35
Tigers	7	14	10	21	52

=== At Tulane ===
	1	2	3	4	Total
Tigers	7	0	7	10	24
Green Wave	14	3	7	16	40

=== UConn ===
	1	2	3	4	Total
Huskies	7	7	0	0	14
Tigers	13	28	7	7	55

=== UCF ===
	1	2	3	4	Total
No. 10 Knights	7	10	7	7	31
Tigers	17	13	0	0	30

=== At Missouri ===
	1	2	3	4	Total
MEM Tigers	3	17	7	6	33
MIZZU Tigers	21	27	14	3	65

=== At East Carolina ===
	1	2	3	4	Total
Tigers	10	14	14	21	59
Pirates	14	3	17	7	41

=== Tulsa ===
	1	2	3	4	Total
Golden Hurricane	0	0	14	7	21
Tigers	17	10	7	13	47

=== At SMU ===
	1	2	3	4	Total
Tigers	0	7	7	14	28
Mustangs	3	2	7	6	18

=== Houston ===
	1	2	3	4	Total
Cougars	7	14	10	0	31
Tigers	3	14	14	21	52

=== At UCF (AAC Championship game) ===
	1	2	3	4	Total
Tigers	24	14	3	0	41
No. 7 Knights	7	14	14	21	56

=== Vs. Wake Forest (Birmingham Bowl) ===
	1	2	3	4	Total
Tigers	14	14	0	6	34
Demon Deacons	7	17	6	7	37

== Players drafted into the NFL ==
Round	Pick	Player	Position	NFL Club
3	70	Darrell Henderson	RB	Los Angeles Rams
4	128	Tony Pollard	RB	Dallas Cowboys
