= 2018 UConn Huskies football team =

American college football season

2018 UConn Huskies football
- Conference: American Athletic Conference
- East Division
- Record: 1–11 (0–8 AAC)
- Head coach: Randy Edsall (14th season)
- Offensive coordinator: John Dunn (1st season)
- Offensive scheme: Pro-style
- Defensive coordinator: Billy Crocker (2nd season)
- Base defense: 3–3–5
- Home stadium: Pratt & Whitney Stadium at Rentschler Field

2018 American Athletic Conference football standings
	Conf.			Overall
Team	W		L	W		L
East Division
No. 11 UCF x$	8	–	0	12	–	1
Temple	7	–	1	8	–	5
No. 24 Cincinnati	6	–	2	11	–	2
South Florida	3	–	5	7	–	6
East Carolina	1	–	7	3	–	9
UConn	0	–	8	1	–	11
West Division
Memphis xy	5	–	3	8	–	6
Houston x	5	–	3	8	–	5
Tulane x	5	–	3	7	–	6
SMU	4	–	4	5	–	7
Navy	2	–	6	3	–	10
Tulsa	2	–	6	3	–	9
Championship: UCF 56, Memphis 41
$ – Conference champion; x – Division champion/co-champions; y – Championship game participant; Rankings from AP Poll

The 2018 UConn Huskies football team represented the University of Connecticut (UConn) as a member of the American Athletic Conference (AAC) during the 2018 NCAA Division I FBS football season. Led by 14th-year head coach Randy Edsall, the Huskies compiled an overall record of 1–11 with a mark of 0–8 in conference play, placing last out of six teams the AAC's East Division. The team played home games at Pratt & Whitney Stadium at Rentschler Field in East Hartford, Connecticut.

UConn set NCAA Division I Football Bowl Subdivision (FBS) records for most yards and most points allowed in a single season. The Huskies gave up 50.42 points per game, breaking the record of 50.27 set by the 1997 Southwestern Louisiana Ragin' Cajuns football team, and allowed 617.4 yards per game, surpassing the mark of 560.8 set by the 2015 Kansas Jayhawks football team.

== Schedule ==
Date	Time	Opponent	Site	TV	Result	Attendance
August 30	7:00 p.m.	No. 21 UCF	Pratt & Whitney Stadium at Rentschler Field; East Hartford, CT (Civil Conflict)	ESPNU	L 17–56	23,081
September 8	10:15 p.m.	at No. 20 Boise State*	Albertsons Stadium; Boise, ID	ESPNU	L 7–62	34,515
September 15	12:00 p.m.	No. 25 (FCS) Rhode Island*	Pratt & Whitney Stadium at Rentschler Field; East Hartford, CT (rivalry)	SNY, ESPN3	W 56–49	20,691
September 22	4:00 p.m.	at Syracuse*	Carrier Dome; Syracuse, NY (rivalry)	ESPNews	L 21–51	36,632
September 29	3:30 p.m.	Cincinnati	Pratt & Whitney Stadium at Rentschler Field; East Hartford, CT	CBSSN	L 7–49	20,322
October 6	7:00 p.m.	at Memphis	Liberty Bowl Memorial Stadium; Memphis, TN	CBSSN	L 14–55	27,581
October 20	7:00 p.m.	at No. 21 South Florida	Raymond James Stadium; Tampa, FL	CBSSN	L 30–38	42,127
October 27	12:00 p.m.	UMass*	Pratt & Whitney Stadium at Rentschler Field; East Hartford, CT (rivalry)	ESPNU	L 17–22	24,150
November 3	7:00 p.m.	at Tulsa	Skelly Field at H. A. Chapman Stadium; Tulsa, OK	CBSSN	L 19–49	17,451
November 10	12:00 p.m.	SMU	Pratt & Whitney Stadium at Rentschler Field; East Hartford, CT	ESPN3	L 50–62	19,096
November 17	7:00 p.m.	at East Carolina	Dowdy–Ficklen Stadium; Greenville, NC	CBSSN	L 21–55	27,234
November 24	3:30 p.m.	Temple	Pratt & Whitney Stadium at Rentschler Field; East Hartford, CT	ESPNU	L 7–57	18,203
*Non-conference game; Rankings from AP Poll released prior to the game; All times are in Eastern time

== Preseason ==
=== Award watch lists ===
Listed in the order that they were released

Award	Player	Position	Year
Rimington Trophy	Ryan Crozier	C	SR

=== AAC media poll ===
The AAC media poll was released on July 24, 2018, with the Huskies predicted to finish fifth in the AAC East Division.

== Game summaries ==
=== UCF ===
UCF Knights at Connecticut Huskies – Game summary

Quarter	1	2	3	4	Total
No. 21 Knights	14	14	14	14	56
Huskies	0	10	0	7	17

at Pratt & Whitney Stadium at Rentschler Field • East Hartford, Connecticut

- Date: August 30, 2018
- Game time: 7:03 p.m. EST, Duration: 3:13
- Game weather: Temperature: 84 °F (29 °C) • Wind: W 2 • Weather: Unseasonably warm
- Game attendance: 23,081
- Referee: Adam Savoie • Umpire: William Thomas • Linesman: M. Fitzgerald • Line Judge: Jeffrey Cooney • Back Judge: Victor Firth • Field Judge: Mark Windham • Side Judge: Ryan Robinson • Center Judge: Ryan Wingers
- TV announcers (ESPNU): Clay Matvick (play-by-play), Dan Orlovsky (color analyst) & Paul Carcaterra (sideline)
- Box Score

Game information

First Quarter

- UCF • 11:01 • Adrian Killins 2 yd run (Matthew Wright kick) • UCF 7–0
- UCF • 09:00 • Tre Nixon 34 yd pass from M Milton (Matthew Wright kick) • UCF 14–0

Second Quarter

- UCONN • 09:17 • Mike Tarbutt 44 yd field goal • UCF 14–3
- UCF • 08:24 • Gabriel Davis 10 yd pass from M Milton (Matthew Wright kick) • UCF 21–3
- UCONN • 04:04 • Tyler Davis 5 yd pass from David Pindell (Mike Tarbutt kick) • UCF 21–10
- UCF • 02:35 • O Anderson 5 yd pass from M Milton (Matthew Wright kick) • UCF 28–10

Third Quarter

- UCF • 12:33 • O Anderson 10 yd run (Matthew Wright kick) • UCF 35–10
- UCF • 04:30 • Tre Nixon 11 yd pass from M Milton (Matthew Wright kick) • UCF 42–10

Fourth Quarter

- UCF • 14:47 • Greg McCrae 36 yd pass from M Milton (Matthew Wright kick) • UCF 49–10
- UCF • 10:04 • Darriel Mack 70 yd run (Matthew Wright kick) • UCF 56–10
- UCONN • 03:11 • David Pindell 14 yd run (Mike Tarbutt kick) • UCF 56–17

Top Passers

- UCF – M Milton – 24/32, 346 yds, 5 TDs
- UCONN – David Pindell – 27/41, 266 yds, 1 TD

Top Rushers

- UCF – Darriel Mack – 1 attempt, 70 yds, 1 TD
- UCONN – David Pindell – 22 attempts, 157 yds, 1 TD

Top Receiving

- UCF – Tre Nixon – 5 receptions, 101 yds, 2 TDs
- UCONN – Kyle Buss – 7 receptions, 113 yds

Top Tacklers

- UCF – Eric Mitchell – 10 tackles
- UCONN – Tyler Coyle – 10 tackles

=== At Boise State ===
Connecticut Huskies at Boise State Broncos – Game summary

Quarter	1	2	3	4	Total
Huskies	0	0	7	0	7
No. 20 Broncos	24	17	14	7	62

at Albertsons Stadium • Boise, Idaho

- Date: September 8, 2018
- Game time: 10:17 p.m. EST, Duration: 2:58
- Game weather: Temperature: 78 °F (26 °C) • Wind: SSE 5 • Weather: Clear skies
- Game attendance: 34,515
- Referee: C. Lamertina • Umpire: Mike Powell • Linesman: Jim Casey • Line Judge: Stephen Ray • Back Judge: Bryon Adams • Field Judge: Rick Santilli • Side Judge: Matt Waldron • Center Judge: Joe Clarkson
- TV announcers (ESPNU): Mike Couzens (play-by-play) and Kirk Morrison (color analyst)
- Box Score

Game information

First Quarter

- BSU • 09:42 • Haden Hoggarth 28 yd field goal • BSU 3–0
- BSU • 07:13 • J Hightower 67 yd pass from Brett Rypien (Haden Hoggarth kick) • BSU 10–0
- BSU • 04:25 • John Bates 24 yd pass from Brett Rypien (Haden Hoggarth kick) • BSU 17–0
- BSU • 00:45 • Alex Mattison 1 yd run (Haden Hoggarth kick) • BSU 24–0

Second Quarter

- BSU • 11:58 • J Hightower 55 yd run (Haden Hoggarth kick) • BSU 31–0
- BSU • 02:04 • Alex Mattison 9 yd run (Haden Hoggarth kick) • BSU 38–0
- BSU • 00:02 • Haden Hoggarth 44 yd field goal • BSU 41–0

Third Quarter

- BSU • 14:40 • AJ Richardson 74 yd pass from Brett Rypien (Haden Hoggarth kick) • BSU 48–0
- UCONN • 05:52 • Aaron McLean 15 yd pass from David Pindell (Michael Tarbutt kick) • BSU 48–7
- BSU • 03:11 • A Van Buren 3 yd run (Haden Hoggarth kick) • BSU 55–7

Fourth Quarter

- BSU • 10:12 • Akilian Butler 24 yd pass from Chase Cord (Haden Hoggarth kick) • BSU 62–7

Top Passers

- BSU – Brett Rypien – 21/28, 362 yds, 3 TDs
- UCONN – David Pindell – 11/21, 71 yds, 1 TD

Top Rushers

- BSU – Alex Mattison – 11 attempt, 115 yds, 2 TDs
- UCONN – Kevin Mensah – 10 attempts, 82 yds

Top Receiving

- BSU – J Hightower – 5 receptions, 119 yds, 1 TD
- UCONN – Hergy Mayala – 3 receptions, 24 yds

Top Tacklers

- BSU – Kekoa Nawahine – 5 tackles
- UCONN – Tyler Coyle – 14 tackles

=== Rhode Island ===
Rhode Island Rams at Connecticut Huskies – Game summary

Quarter	1	2	3	4	Total
No. 25 (FCS) Rams	7	21	14	7	49
Huskies	14	28	7	7	56

at Pratt & Whitney Stadium at Rentschler Field • East Hartford, Connecticut

- Date: September 15, 2018
- Game time: 12:06 p.m. EST, Duration: 3:23
- Game weather: Temperature: 76 °F (24 °C) • Wind: 2 SE • Weather: Sunny and pleasant
- Game attendance: 20,691
- Referee: Todd LaPenta • Umpire: Bill Lamkin • Linesman: Adam Loudin • Line Judge: Christian Keel • Back Judge: Eric Hartman • Field Judge: James Reif • Side Judge: Ken Bushey
- TV announcers (SNY): Eamon McAnaney (play-by-play), Andy Gresh (color) & Justine Ward (sideline)
- Box Score

Game information

First Quarter

- UCONN • 12:55 • David Pindell 17 yd run (Michael Tarbutt kick) • UCONN 7–0
- URI • 09:10 • Beauvais 22 yd pass from Lawson (Carrick kick) • TIED 7–7
- UCONN • 04:46 • Kevin Mensah 11 yd run (Michael Tarbutt kick) • UCONN 14–7

Second Quarter

- UCONN • 12:06 • Hergy Mayala 5 yd pass from David Pindell (Michael Tarbutt kick) • UCONN 21–7
- URI • 09:57 • A Parker 17 yd pass from Lawson (Carrick kick) • UCONN 21–14
- UCONN • 09:12 • Hero Mauriseau 74 yd pass from David Pindell (Michael Tarbutt kick) • UCONN 28–14
- URI • 07:08 • Lawson 37 yd run (Carrick kick) • UCONN 28–21
- UCONN • 02:55 • Hergy Mayala 13 yd pass from David Pindell (Michael Tarbutt kick) • UCONN 35–21
- URI • 01:26 • Coulter 15 yd pass from Lawson (Carrick kick) • UCONN 35–28
- UCONN • 00:13 • Aaron McLean 19 yd pass from David Pindell (Michael Tarbutt kick) • UCONN 42–28

Third Quarter

- URI • 08:33 • Lawson 16 yd run (Carrick kick) • UCONN 42–35
- URI • 06:04 • Burke 5 yd pass from Lawson (Carrick kick) • TIED 42–42
- UCONN • 00:55 • David Pindell 6 yd run (Michael Tarbutt kick) • UCONN 49–42

Fourth Quarter

- URI • 03:13 • Naim Jones 14 yd run (Carrick kick) • TIED 49–49
- UCONN • 00:57 • Kevin Mensah 22 yd run (Michael Tarbutt kick) • UCONN 56–49

Top Passers

- URI – Lawson – 23/34, 351 yds, 4 TDs
- UCONN – David Pindell – 20/27, 308 yds, 4 TDs

Top Rushers

- URI – Naim Jones – 11 attempts, 95 yds, 1 TD
- UCONN – Kevin Mensah – 25 attempts, 137 yds, 2 TDs

Top Receiving

- URI – Coulter – 10 receptions, 156 yds, 1 TD
- UCONN – Hero Mauriseau – 1 reception, 74 yds, 1 TD

Top Tacklers

- URI – D Stewart – 11 tackles
- UCONN – Tyler Coyle – 9 tackles

=== At Syracuse ===
Connecticut Huskies at Syracuse Orange – Game summary

Quarter	1	2	3	4	Total
Huskies	7	7	0	7	21
Orange	24	7	10	10	51

at Carrier Dome • Syracuse, New York

- Date: September 22, 2018
- Game time: 4:01 p.m. EST, Duration: 3:30
- Game attendance: 36,632
- Referee: A. Calabrese • Umpire: Jeff Akers • Linesman: Brian Perry • Line Judge: Colin Gaynor • Back Judge: James Sima • Field Judge: Glen Wilson • Side Judge: Bruce Williams
- TV announcers (ESPNews): Shawn Kenney (play-by-play) & Dustin Fox (color)
- Box Score

Game information

First Quarter

- SU • 09:15 • E Dungey 2 yd run (A Szmyt kick) • SU 7–0
- SU • 06:24 • E Dungey 9 yd run (A Szmyt kick) • SU 14–0
- SU • 03:53 • G Horan 7 yd pass from E Dungey (A Szmyt kick) • SU 21–0
- UCONN • 03:43 • David Pindell 75 yd run (Michael Tarbutt kick) • SU 21–7
- SU • 01:52 • A Szmyt 33 yd field goal • SU 24–7

Second Quarter

- UCONN • 11:41 • Zavier Scott 2 yd pass from David Pindell (Michael Tarbutt kick) • SU 24–14
- SU • 09:10 • E Dungey 1 yd run (A Szmyt kick) • SU 31–14

Third Quarter

- SU • 10:35 • S Riley 69 yd punt return (A Szmyt kick) • SU 38–14
- SU • 04:27 • A Szmyt 27 yd field goal • SU 41–14

Fourth Quarter

- UCONN • 14:18 • Tyler Davis 26 yd pass from Marvin Washington (Michael Tarbutt kick) • SU 41–21
- SU • 11:21 • S Riley 49 yd pass from E Dungey (A Szmyt kick) • SU 48–21
- SU • 07:43 • A Szmyt 25 yd field goal • SU 51–21

Top Passers

- SU – E Dungey – 21/27, 286 yds, 2 TDs
- UCONN – David Pindell – 17/24, 151 yds, 1 TD

Top Rushers

- SU – M Neal – 13 attempts, 116 yds
- UCONN – David Pindell – 12 attempts, 76 yds, 1 TD

Top Receiving

- SU – S Riley – 6 receptions, 120 yds, 1 TD
- UCONN – Tyler Davis – 3 reception, 44 yds, 1 TD

Top Tacklers

- SU – K Whitner – 9 tackles
- UCONN – Eddie Hahn – 11 tackles

=== Cincinnati ===
Cincinnati Bearcats at Connecticut Huskies – Game summary

Quarter	1	2	3	4	Total
Bearcats	7	14	21	7	49
Huskies	7	0	0	0	7

at Pratt & Whitney Stadium at Rentschler Field • East Hartford, Connecticut

- Date: September 29, 2018
- Game time: 3:32 p.m. EST, Duration: 3:19
- Game weather: Temperature: 70 °F (21 °C) • Wind: WNW 10 • Weather: Sunny and pleasant
- Game attendance: 20,322
- Referee: Mike Roche • Umpire: Hilbert Byers • Linesman: Adam Loudin • Line Judge: Lance Thompson • Back Judge: Mike Griffith • Field Judge: Ben Vasconcells • Side Judge: Jake Dishaw
- TV announcers (CBSSN): Rich Waltz (play-by-play), Aaron Murray (color)
- Box Score

Game information

First Quarter

- UCONN • 13:06 • Kyle Buss 5 yd pass from David Pindell (Michael Tarbutt kick) • UCONN 7–0
- CIN • 07:28 • Desmond Ridder 1 yd run (Cole Smith kick) • TIED 7–7

Second Quarter

- CIN • 14:16 • Michael Warren 2 yd run (Cole Smith kick) • CIN 14–7
- CIN • 00:23 • Rashad Medaris 15 yd pass from Desmond Ridder (Cole Smith kick) • CIN 21–7

Third Quarter

- CIN • 14:27 • Josiah Deguara 38 yd pass from Desmond Ridder (Cole Smith kick) • CIN 28–7
- CIN • 09:27 • Michael Warren 14 yd run (Cole Smith kick) • CIN 35–7
- CIN • 01:18 • Tavion Thomas 1 yd run (Cole Smith kick) • CIN 42–7

Fourth Quarter

- CIN • 12:11 • Hayden Moore 11 yd run (Cole Smith kick) • CIN 49–7

Top Passers

- CIN – Desmond Ridder – 20/26, 270 yds, 2 TDs
- UCONN – David Pindell – 9/23, 125 yds, 1 TD

Top Rushers

- CIN – Michael Warren – 13 attempts, 106 yds, 2 TDs
- UCONN – Zavier Scott – 4 attempts, 53 yds

Top Receiving

- CIN – Josiah Deguara – 5 receptions, 112 yds, 1 TD
- UCONN – Aaron McLean – 4 reception, 97 yds

Top Tacklers

- CIN – Perry Young – 8 tackles
- UCONN – Tyler Coyle – 14 tackles

=== At Memphis ===
Connecticut Huskies at Memphis Tigers – Game summary

Quarter	1	2	3	4	Total
Huskies	7	7	0	0	14
Tigers	13	28	7	7	55

at Liberty Bowl Memorial Stadium • Memphis, Tennessee

- Date: October 6, 2018
- Game time: 7:07 p.m. EST, Duration: 3:06
- Game weather: Temperature: 84 °F (29 °C) • Wind: S 5 • Weather: Clear
- Game attendance: 27,581
- Referee: Tracy Jones • Umpire: K. Huffhines • Linesman: Daniel Shelton • Line Judge: Baron Ballester • Back Judge: James E Downey • Field Judge: Chris Bikowski • Side Judge: Matt Waldron
- TV announcers (CBSSN): Dave Ryan (play-by-play) & Danny Kanell (color)
- Box Score

Game information

First Quarter

- MEM • 13:12 • Joey Magnifico 44 yd pass from Brady White (R Patterson kick) • MEM 7–0
- UCONN • 05:40 • David Pindell 4 yd run (Clayton Harris kick) • TIED 7–7
- MEM • 00:55 • D Henderson 2 yd run (R Patterson kick failed) • MEM 13–7

Second Quarter

- MEM • 11:23 • D Henderson 61 yd run (R Patterson kick) • MEM 20–7
- MEM • 08:15 • Patrick Taylor 35 yd run (R Patterson kick) • MEM 27–7
- MEM • 05:56 • Patrick Taylor 35 yd run (R Patterson kick) • MEM 34–7
- MEM • 03:10 • D Henderson 26 yd run (R Patterson kick) • MEM 41–7
- UCONN • 00:26 • Keyion Dixon 14 yd pass from David Pindell (Clayton Harris kick) • MEM 41–14

Third Quarter

- MEM • 08:21 • Patrick Taylor 12 yd run (R Patterson kick) • MEM 48–14

Fourth Quarter

- MEM • 05:59 • Antonio Gibson 17 yd pass from Connor Adair (R Patterson kick) • MEM 55–14

Top Passers

- MEM – Brady White – 16/18, 239 yds, 1 TD
- UCONN – David Pindell – 22/37, 190 yds, 1 TD

Top Rushers

- MEM – Darrell Henderson – 14 attempts, 174 yds, 3 TDs
- UCONN – Zavier Scott – 6 attempts, 44 yds

Top Receiving

- MEM – Sean Dykes – 3 receptions, 62 yds
- UCONN – Aaron McLean – 6 reception, 64 yds

Top Tacklers

- MEM – Curtis Akins – 8 tackles
- UCONN – Omar Fortt – 13 tackles

=== At South Florida ===
Connecticut Huskies at South Florida Bulls – Game summary

Quarter	1	2	3	4	Total
Huskies	7	0	7	16	30
No. 21 Bulls	0	7	17	14	38

at Raymond James Stadium • Tampa, Florida

- Date: October 20, 2018
- Game time: 7:00 p.m. EST, Duration: 3:18
- Game weather: Temperature: 80 °F (27 °C) • Wind: 7 • Weather: Partly cloudy
- Game attendance: 42,127
- Referee: Adam Savoie • Umpire: William Thomas • Linesman: Dan Harrington • Line Judge: Peter Beratta • Back Judge: Victor Firth • Field Judge: Mark Windham • Side Judge: Ryan Robinson
- TV announcers (CBSSN): Jason Horowitz (play-by-play) & David Diehl (color)
- Box score

Game information

First Quarter

- UCONN • 08:33 • Kevin Mensah 10 yd run (Clayton Harris kick) • UCONN 7–0

Second Quarter

- USF • 00:43 • Johnny Ford 15 yd run (Coby Weiss kick) • TIED 7–7

Third Quarter

- USF • 14:49 • R St. Felix 75 yd pass from Blake Barnett (Coby Weiss kick) • USF 14–7
- USF • 06:07 • Coby Weiss 30 yd field goal • USF 17–7
- UCONN • 03:14 • David Pindell 10 yd run (Clayton Harris kick) • USF 17–14
- USF • 02:34 • Blake Barnett 20 yd run (Coby Weiss kick) • USF 24–14

Fourth Quarter

- USF • 14:36 • Johnny Ford 15 yd run (Coby Weiss kick) • USF 31–14
- UCONN • 08:56 • Kevin Mensah 4 yd run (Clayton Harris kick blocked) • USF 31–20
- UCONN • 07:20 • Clayton Harris 38 yd field goal • USF 31–23
- USF • 04:46 • Johnny Ford 43 yd run (Coby Weiss kick) • USF 38–23
- UCONN • 02:24 • David Pindell 12 yd run (Clayton Harris kick) • USF 38–30

Top Passers

- USF – Blake Barnett – 20/28, 265 yds, 1 TD
- UCONN – David Pindell – 10/21, 133 yds

Top Rushers

- USF – Johnny Ford – 7 attempts, 164 yds, 3 TDs
- UCONN – David Pindell – 28 attempts, 197 yds, 2 TDs

Top Receiving

- USF – R St. Felix – 2 receptions, 123 yds, 1 TD
- UCONN – Hergy Mayala – 5 reception, 61 yds

Top Tacklers

- USF – Mekhi LaPointe – 11 tackles
- UCONN – Oneil Robinson – 9 tackles

=== UMass ===
UMass Minutemen at Connecticut Huskies – Game summary

Quarter	1	2	3	4	Total
Minutemen	3	0	6	13	22
Huskies	7	0	7	3	17

at Pratt & Whitney Stadium at Rentschler Field • East Hartford, Connecticut

- Date: October 27, 2018
- Game time: 12:02 p.m. EST, Duration: 2:49
- Game weather: Temperature: 43 °F (6 °C) • Wind: 15 NE • Weather: Nor'easter with rain
- Game attendance: 24,150
- Referee: C. Lamertina • Umpire: Jeff Akers • Linesman: Jim Casey • Line Judge: Stephen Ray • Back Judge: Byron Adams • Field Judge: Rick Santilli • Side Judge: Jim Smith
- TV announcers (ESPNU): Mike Corey (play-by-play) & Rene Ingoglia (color)
- Box Score

Game information

First Quarter

- UCONN • 11:24 • Kevin Mensah 1 yd run (Michael Tarbutt kick) • UCONN 7–0
- UMASS • 08:01 • Cooper Garcia 20 yd field goal • UCONN 7–3

Third Quarter

- UCONN • 11:17 • David Pindell 25 yd run (Michael Tarbutt kick) • UCONN 14–3
- UMASS • 08:43 • Andy Isabella 38 yd pass from Ross Comis (Mike Caggiano kick failed) • UCONN 14–9

Fourth Quarter

- UCONN • 12:27 • Michael Tarbutt 41 yd field goal • UCONN 17–9
- UMASS • 12:12 • Zak Simon 67 yd pass from Ross Comis (Ross Comis rush failed) • UCONN 17–15
- UMASS • 03:39 • Marquis Young 3 yd run (Cooper Garcia kick) • UMASS 22–17

Top Passers

- UMASS – Ross Comis – 8/15, 197 yds, 2 TD
- UCONN – David Pindell – 4/6, 15 yds

Top Rushers

- UMASS – Marquis Young – 26 attempts, 148 yds, 1 TD
- UCONN – David Pindell – 21 attempts, 120 yds, 1 TD

Top Receiving

- UMASS – Any Isabella – 4 receptions, 78 yds, 1 TD
- UCONN – Zavier Scott – 1 reception, 7 yds

Top Tacklers

- UMASS – Bryton Barr – 8 tackles
- UCONN – Marshe Terry – 11 tackles

=== At Tulsa ===
Connecticut Huskies at Tulsa Golden Hurricane – Game summary

Quarter	1	2	3	4	Total
Huskies	10	3	0	6	19
Golden Hurricane	0	28	21	0	49

at Skelly Field at H. A. Chapman Stadium • Tulsa, Oklahoma

- Date: November 3, 2018
- Game time: 7:02 p.m. EST, Duration: 3:23
- Game weather: Temperature: 66 °F (19 °C) • Wind: SSE 11 • Weather: Cloudy
- Game attendance: 17,451
- Referee: Mike Roche • Umpire: Hilbert Byers • Linesman: Adam Loudin • Line Judge: Lance Thompson • Back Judge: Byron Adams • Field Judge: Ben Vasconcells • Side Judge: Jake Dishaw
- TV announcers (CBSSN): John Sadek (play-by-play) & Randy Cross (color)
- Box Score

Game information

First Quarter

- UCONN • 07:21 • Kyle Buss 80 yd pass from David Pindell (Michael Tarbutt kick) • UCONN 7–0
- UCONN • 00:20 • Michael Tarbutt 44 yd field goal • UCONN 10–0

Second Quarter

- TLSA • 12:11 • K Stokes 3 yd pass from S Boomer (J Romo kick) • UCONN 10–7
- UCONN • 08:52 • Michael Tarbutt 50 yd field goal • UCONN 13–7
- TLSA • 06:40 • S Boomer 1 yd run (J Romo kick) • TLSA 14–13
- TLSA • 03:41 • K Johnson 26 yd pass from S Boomer (J Romo kick) • TLSA 21–13
- TLSA • 01:11 • C Taylor II 6 yd run (J Romo kick) • TLSA 28–13

Third Quarter

- TLSA • 11:47 • C Neph 38 yd pass from S Boomer (J Romo kick) • TLSA 35–13
- TLSA • 08:59 • J Hobbs 18 yd pass from S Boomer (J Romo kick) • TLSA 42–13
- TLSA • 02:15 • R Martin 11 yd run (T Lacey kick) • TLSA 49–13

Fourth Quarter

- UCONN • 07:21 • Tyler Davis 3 yd pass from David Pindell (David Pindell pass failed) • TLSA 49–19

Top Passers

- TLSA – S Boomer – 9/14, 168 yds, 4 TDs
- UCONN – David Pindell – 14/28, 232 yds, 2 TDs

Top Rushers

- TLSA – S Brooks – 17 attempts, 151 yds
- UCONN – David Pindell – 23 attempts, 150 yds

Top Receiving

- TLSA – C Neph – 2 receptions, 57 yds, 1 TD
- UCONN – Kyle Buss – 6 reception, 129 yds, 1 TD

Top Tacklers

- TLSA – C Edmiston – 10 tackles
- UCONN – Oneil Robinson – 15 tackles

=== SMU ===
SMU Mustangs at Connecticut Huskies – Game summary

Quarter	1	2	3	4	Total
Mustangs	17	14	14	17	62
Huskies	7	3	14	26	50

at Pratt & Whitney Stadium at Rentschler Field • East Hartford, Connecticut

- Date: November 10, 2018
- Game time: 12:06 p.m. EST, Duration: 3:40
- Game weather: Temperature: 45 °F (7 °C) • Wind: 16 W • Weather: Sunny and windy
- Game attendance: 19,096
- Referee: A. Calabrese • Umpire: Jeff Akers • Linesman: Brian Perry • Line Judge: Colin Gaynor • Back Judge: James Sima • Field Judge: Glen Wilson • Side Judge: Bruce Williams
- TV announcers (ESPN3): Drew Fellios (play-by-play) & Al Groh (color)
- Box Score

Game information

First Quarter

- SMU • 11:31 • Kevin Robledo 39 yd field goal • SMU 3–0
- SMU • 07:24 • Ke'Mon Freeman 39 yd run (Kevin Robledo kick) • SMU 10–0
- UCONN • 04:38 • David Pindell 30 yd run (Michael Tarbutt kick) • SMU 10–7
- SMU • 03:10 • Ke'Mon Freeman 5 yd run (Kevin Robledo kick) • SMU 17–7

Second Quarter

- SMU • 11:15 • Ryan Becker 3 yd pass from Tyler Page (Kevin Robledo kick) • SMU 24–7
- UCONN • 08:33 • Michael Tarbutt 45 yd field goal • SMU 24–10
- SMU • 07:36 • Braeden West 6 yd run (Kevin Robledo kick) • SMU 31–10

Third Quarter

- UCONN • 11:10 • Hergy Mayala 22 yd pass from David Pindell (Michael Tarbutt kick) • SMU 31–17
- SMU • 10:40 • Xavier Jones 52 yd run (Kevin Robledo kick) • SMU 38–17
- UCONN • 06:50 • Kyle Buss 15 yd pass from David Pindell (Michael Tarbutt kick) • SMU 38–24
- SMU • 03:54 • R Robertson Jr. 6 yd pass from Ben Hicks (Kevin Robledo kick) • SMU 45–24

Fourth Quarter

- UCONN • 14:57 • Tyler Davis 5 yd pass from David Pindell (Michael Tarbutt kick) • SMU 45–31
- SMU • 14:48 • Xavier Jones 43 yd run (Kevin Robledo kick) • SMU 52–31
- UCONN • 13:41 • David Pindell 48 yd run (Michael Tarbutt kick blocked) • SMU 52–37
- UCONN • 10:18 • Kevin Mensah 19 yd run (Michael Tarbutt kick) • SMU 52–44
- SMU • 08:55 • Ke'Mon Freeman 3 yd run (Kevin Robledo kick) • SMU 59–44
- SMU • 03:35 • Kevin Robledo 30 yd field goal • SMU 62–44
- UCONN • 00:36 • Hergy Mayala 14 yd pass from David Pindell (David Pindell pass intercepted) • SMU 62–50

Top Passers

- SMU – Ben Hicks – 19/29, 276 yds, 1 TD
- UCONN – David Pindell – 25/38, 215 yds, 4 TDs

Top Rushers

- SMU – Xavier Jones – 11 attempts, 133 yds, 2 TDs
- UCONN – Kevin Mensah – 28 attempts, 187 yds, 1 TD

Top Receiving

- SMU – James Proche – 6 receptions, 101 yds
- UCONN – Aaron McLean – 7 receptions, 82 yds

Top Tacklers

- SMU – Elijah McQueen – 12 tackles
- UCONN – Santana Sterling – 13 tackles

=== At East Carolina ===
Connecticut Huskies at East Carolina Pirates – Game summary

Quarter	1	2	3	4	Total
Huskies	7	14	0	0	21
Pirates	7	27	14	7	55

at Dowdy–Ficklen Stadium • Greenville, North Carolina

- Date: November 17, 2018
- Game time: 7:02 p.m. EST, Duration: 3:12
- Game weather: Temperature: 43 °F (6 °C) • Wind: Calm • Weather: Clear
- Game attendance: 27,234
- Referee: Adam Savoie • Umpire: William Thomas • Linesman: Dan Harrington • Line Judge: Brian Sakowski • Back Judge: James Sima • Field Judge: Mark Windham • Side Judge: Ryan Robinson
- TV announcers (CBSSN): Dave Ryan (play-by-play) & Corey Chavous (color)
- Box Score

Game information

First Quarter

- UCONN • 10:24 • Tyler Davis 41 yd pass from David Pindell (Michael Tarbutt kick) • UCONN 7–0
- ECU • 07:33 • Tyler Snead 6 yd pass from Holton Ahlers (Jake Verity kick) • TIED 7–7

Second Quarter

- UCONN • 14:55 • Tyler Davis 13 yd pass from David Pindell (Michael Tarbutt kick) • UCONN 14–7
- ECU • 12:57 • Tyler Snead 24 yd pass from Holton Ahlers (Jake Verity kick) • TIED 14–14
- UCONN • 11:16 • Hergy Mayala 6 yd pass from David Pindell (Michael Tarbutt kick) • UCONN 21–14
- ECU • 08:17 • Holton Ahlers 2 yd run (Jake Verity kick) • TIED 21–21
- ECU • 02:03 • Anthony Scott 5 yd run (Jake Verity kick) • ECU 28–21
- ECU • 00:51 • Jake Verity 26 yd field goal • ECU 31–21
- ECU • 00:00 • Jake Verity 39 yd field goal • ECU 34–21

Third Quarter

- ECU • 09:52 • Tyler Snead 5 yd pass from Holton Ahlers (Jake Verity kick) • ECU 41–21
- ECU • 02:28 • Trevon Brown 9 yd pass from Holton Ahlers (Jake Verity kick) • ECU 48–21

Fourth Quarter

- ECU • 10:14 • Trce Christian 8 yd run (Caleb Pratt kick) • ECU 55–21

Top Passers

- ECU – Holton Ahlers – 22/31, 242 yds, 4 TDs
- UCONN – David Pindell – 15/25, 156 yds, 3 TDs

Top Rushers

- ECU – Holton Ahlers – 12 attempts, 130 yds, 1 TD
- UCONN – Kevin Mensah – 14 attempts, 88 yds

Top Receiving

- ECU – Tyler Snead – 6 receptions, 62 yds, 3 TDs
- UCONN – Tyler Davis – 4 receptions, 66 yds, 2 TDs

Top Tacklers

- ECU – Ray Tillman – 10 tackles
- UCONN – Santana Sterling – 14 tackles

=== Temple ===
Temple Owls at Connecticut Huskies – Game summary

Quarter	1	2	3	4	Total
Owls	13	27	7	10	57
Huskies	7	0	0	0	7

at Pratt & Whitney Stadium at Rentschler Field • East Hartford, Connecticut

- Date: November 24, 2018
- Game time: 3:32 p.m. EST, Duration: 3:02
- Game weather: Temperature: 41 °F (5 °C) • Wind: 10 ENE • Weather: Cloudy and Gray
- Game attendance: 18,203
- Referee: Riley Johnson • Umpire: Bill Lamkin • Linesman: Todd Riddick • Line Judge: Jeffrey Cooney • Back Judge: Eric Hartman • Field Judge: James Reif • Side Judge: Ken Bushey
- TV announcers (ESPNU): Bill Roth (play-by-play) & Mike Golic Jr. (color)
- Box Score

Game information

First Quarter

- TEM • 13:00 • Isaiah Wright 18 yd run (Will Mobley kick) • TEM 7–0
- UCONN • 07:06 • Keyion Dixon 4 yd pass from David Pindell (Michael Tarbutt kick) • TIED 7–7
- TEM • 06:53 • Isaiah Wright 99 yd kickoff return (Rush fumbled) • TEM 13–7

Second Quarter

- TEM • 14:24 • Todd Centeio 3 yd run (Will Mobley kick) • TEM 20–7
- TEM • 05:19 • Chris Myarick 5 yd pass from Todd Centeio (Will Mobley kick) • TEM 27–7
- TEM • 03:57 • Will Mobley 18 yd field goal • TEM 30–7
- TEM • 02:38 • C Braswell 8 yd interception return (Will Mobley kick) • TEM 37–7
- TEM • 00:00 • Will Mobley 18 yd field goal • TEM 40–7

Third Quarter

- TEM • 10:20 • Jager Gardner 26 yd run (Will Mobley kick) • TEM 47–7

Fourth Quarter

- TEM • 08:09 • Travon Williams 10 yd run (Will Mobley kick) • TEM 54–7
- TEM • 03:35 • Will Mobley 27 yd field goal • TEM 57–7

Top Passers

- TEM – Frank Nutile – 9/12, 184 yds
- UCONN – David Pindell – 12/23, 89 yds, 1 TD

Top Rushers

- TEM – Jeremy Jennings – 4 attempts, 60 yds
- UCONN – Kevin Mensah – 24 attempts, 94 yds

Top Receiving

- TEM – Randle Jones – 1 reception, 63 yds
- UCONN – Hergy Mayala – 3 receptions, 32 yds

Top Tacklers

- TEM – Delvon Randall – 11 tackles
- UCONN – Santana Sterling – 8 tackles

== Roster ==
2018 Connecticut Huskies football team roster
Players
Coaches
Offense

Pos.	#	Name	Class
WR	1	Hergy Mayala	Sr
WR	2	Tyraiq Beals	Sr
WR	3	Garrison Burnett	Fr
QB	4	Steven Krajewski	Fr
QB	5	David Pindell	Sr
QB	7	Marvin Washington	Fr
TE	8	Aaron McLean	Sr
TE	9	Tyler Davis	Jr
RB	10	Zavier Scott	Fr
RB	11	Nate Hopkins	So
QB	12	Brandon Bisack	Jr
WR	15	Donovan Williams	Jr
QB	17	Jordan McAfee	Fr
WR	19	Quayvon Skanes	So
WR	23	Keyion Dixon	So
WR	26	Kyle Buss	Sr
QB	28	Lavarey Banton	Fr
RB	28	Dante Black	Fr
RB	30	Donevan O'Reilly	Jr
RB	34	Kevin Mensah	So
RB	36	Khyon Gillespie	Fr
OL	50	Dylan Niedrowski	Fr
OL	51	Peter Rooney Jr.	Fr
OL	54	Robert Holmes	Fr
OL	55	Stanley Hubbard III	Fr
OL	56	Nino Leone	So
OL	60	Ben Bonvicini	Jr
OL	61	Douglas Wardlaw	Fr
OL	62	Noel Ofori-Nyadu	Fr
OL	63	Ryan Crozier	Sr
OL	64	Christian Haynes	Fr
OL	65	Matt Peart	Jr
OL	67	Bryan Cespedes	Jr
OL	70	Cam DeGeorge	So
OL	71	James Tunstall	Fr
OL	73	Brendan Casey	Fr
OL	74	Ryan Van Demark	So
OL	76	Harrison Newman	So
OL	78	Ian Campbell	Jr
WR	80	Heron Maurisseau	Fr
WR	82	Mason Donaldson	So
WR	83	TJ Vernieri	Jr
WR	84	Elijah Jeffreys	Fr
WR	85	Justin Morehead	So
WR	87	Cameron Hairston	Fr
TE	90	Zordan Holman	Jr
TE	91	Jay Rose	So

Defense

Pos.	#	Name	Class
LB	6	Eddie Hahn	So
S	8	Jalon Ferrell	Fr
DB	13	Messiah Turner	Fr
DB	14	Tahj Herring-Wilson	So
LB	16	Malik Banks	Fr
DB	18	Abiola Olaniyan	Fr
DB	20	Robert King III	Fr
DB	21	Jeremy Lucien	Fr
LB	22	Eli Thomas	Jr
DB	24	Keyshawn Paul	Fr
DB	25	Tyler Coyle	So
LB	27	Omar Fortt	So
DB	28	Quimonei Bell-Hunter	Fr
DB	29	Jordan Morrison	Fr
DB	31	Oneil Robinson II	Fr
DB	32	Shamel Lazarus	Fr
LB	33	Hunter Webb	Fr
DB	35	Jarrell Chaney	Fr
DB	37	Kyle Williams	Jr
LB	38	Jeff Woodcock	Sr
DB	39	Ryan Carroll	Fr
LB	41	Marshé Terry	Jr
LB	42	T.J. Gardner	Fr
LB	43	Darrian Beavers	So
DB	44	Ian Swenson	Fr
LB	45	Ryan Gilmartin	So
DL	46	AJ Garson	So
LB	46	Anthony Repollet	Fr
LB	47	Justin Bryant	Fr
LB	47	Santana Sterling	Sr
LB	48	Kevon Jones	Fr
LB	49	Rhakim Williams	So
DL	52	Caleb Thomas	Fr
DL	57	Travis Jones	Fr
DL	58	Philippe Okounam	Jr
DL	59	Andrew Migliaccio	So
DL	69	Ryan Fines	Jr
DL	75	Tenzin Pharachesur	Fr
DL	88	Connor Freeborn	Jr
DL	92	Carlton Steer	Sr
DL	93	Pierce DeVaughn	Fr
DL	94	Kevin Murphy	Jr
DL	95	Noel Brouse	So
DL	96	James Atkins	Sr
DL	97	Jonathan Pace	Fr
DL	98	Lwal Uguak	Fr

Special teams

Pos.	#	Name	Class
K	40	Michael Tarbutt	Jr
K	49	Clayton Harris	Fr
LS	53	Brian Keating	So
LS	66	Jeffrey Sidebotham	So
P	81	Brett Graham	So
K	92	Noah Iden	Fr
P	99	Luke Magliozzi	Fr

Head coach

- Randy Edsall

Coordinators/assistant coaches

- John Dunn
  Offensive coordinator
- Billy Crocker
  Defensive coordinator
- Terry Richardson
  Running backs
- Corey Edsall
  Tight ends
- Curome Cox
  Defensive backs
- Dennis Dottin-Carter
  Defensive line
- Frank Giufre
  Offensive line
- Aaron Smith
  Wide receivers
- Jon Wholley
  Linebackers
- Eddie Allen
  Special teams coordinator

Legend

- (C) Team captain
- (S) Suspended
- (I) Ineligible
- Injured
- Redshirt

Roster
Last update: June 30, 2018
