= 2018 American Athletic Conference Football Championship Game =

- 4th AAC Championship Game
- Championship Game Logo
Memphis Tigers	UCF Knights
(8–4)	(11–0)
41	56
Head coach: Mike Norvell	Head coach: Josh Heupel
	AP / Coaches / CFP; 7 / 7 / 8
	1	2	3	4	Total
Memphis	24	14	3	0	41
UCF	7	14	14	21	56
- Date: December 1, 2018
- Season: 2018
- Stadium: Spectrum Stadium
- Location: Orlando, FL
- MVP: Darriel Mack Jr., QB, UCF
- Favorite: UCF by 1
- Attendance: 45,176

United States TV coverage
- Network: ABC
- Announcers: Bob Wischusen (Play-By-Play); Brock Huard (Analyst); Allison Williams (Sidelines)

2018 American Athletic Conference football standings
	Conf.			Overall
Team	W		L	W		L
East Division
No. 11 UCF x$	8	–	0	12	–	1
Temple	7	–	1	8	–	5
No. 24 Cincinnati	6	–	2	11	–	2
South Florida	3	–	5	7	–	6
East Carolina	1	–	7	3	–	9
UConn	0	–	8	1	–	11
West Division
Memphis xy	5	–	3	8	–	6
Houston x	5	–	3	8	–	5
Tulane x	5	–	3	7	–	6
SMU	4	–	4	5	–	7
Navy	2	–	6	3	–	10
Tulsa	2	–	6	3	–	9
Championship: UCF 56, Memphis 41
$ – Conference champion; x – Division champion/co-champions; y – Championship game participant; Rankings from AP Poll

The 2018 American Athletic Conference Football Championship Game was an NCAA Division I college football conference championship game for the American Athletic Conference (AAC) played on December 1, 2018. It was the 4th American Athletic Conference Championship, and was played at Spectrum Stadium in Orlando, Florida.

UCF hosted Memphis, the second consecutive year the Knights hosted the Tigers in the American Athletic Conference Football Championship Game, and fourth meeting between the two schools in the past two seasons. With starting quarterback McKenzie Milton out for the season, the Knights rallied from a 17-point halftime deficit behind back-up quarterback Darriel Mack Jr. and won the conference championship for the second year in a row, and fourth time overall.

== Teams ==
=== Memphis ===
Under the leadership of third-year head coach Mike Norvell, the Memphis Tigers entered the American Championship with a record of 8–4, 5–3 in conference play. They started the season 3–2, with both losses in-conference (at Navy, at Tulane). They rebounded by annihilating Connecticut at home, but then lost to No. 10 UCF. Following a non-conference loss the following week, the Tigers improved on their 4–4 record by winning all four of their remaining games, giving them a four-game win streak coming into their American title game rematch with the Knights.

=== UCF ===
With first-year head coach Josh Heupel at the helm, the No. 7 Knights entered the American title game riding a 24-game win streak dating back to the start of their 2017 season. Prior to the contest, their record stood at 11–0, 8–0 in conference play. The Knights opened the season ranked 21st in the AP poll, but steadily improved with wins over Connecticut, Pittsburgh, Memphis, Temple, No. 19 Cincinnati, and South Florida. The Knights entered the AAC Championship with a 12–1 record all-time against the Tigers; Memphis won their first meeting in 1990 and UCF took every matchup since. However, they faced a potentially devastating blow when the quarterback who had led them through their ongoing winning streak, McKenzie Milton, suffered a catastrophic knee injury in the South Florida game.

== Game summary ==
=== First quarter ===
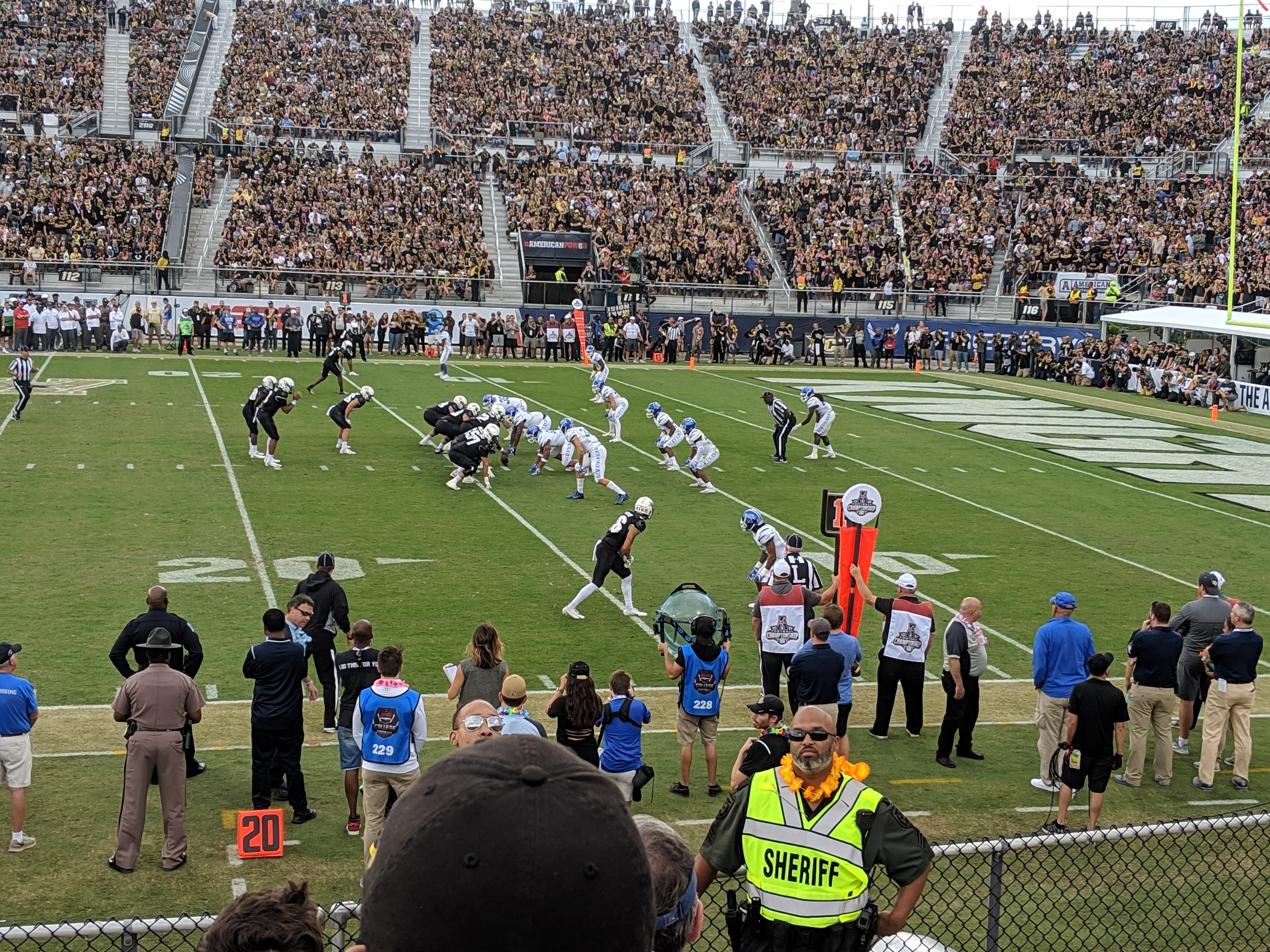
UCF inside the redzone in the first quarter

UCF won the coin toss and elected to defer to the second half. On the fourth play of the game, Tigers running back Darrell Henderson broke free for a 62-yard touchdown run, and a quick 7–0 lead for Memphis. Knights quarterback Darriel Mack Jr. then fumbled away the ball at the UCF 27, leading to Henderson's second touchdown. The Knights finally got on the board, going 65 yards in 7 plays, with a 14-yard touchdown run by Greg McCrae. The Memphis rushing attack struck again quickly. Facing 3rd & 4 at their own 30 yard line, Patrick Taylor Jr. broke free for a 70-yard touchdown, and 21–7 lead. The miscues for the Knights continued, as Mack was sacked and fumbled, leading to a Tigers field goal and a shocking 24–7 lead at the end of the first quarter.

=== Second quarter ===
As the second quarter began, the Knights were driving into Tigers territory. A 20-yard completion from Mack to Gabe Davis sparked the drive, and UCF eventually reached the red zone. Facing 3rd & Goal at the 6, Mack ran up the middle for an apparent touchdown, but the ball was fumbled and bouncing live into the endzone, dangerously close to going out-of-bounds. Michael Colubiale fell on the ball and recovered it for the UCF touchdown.

Darrell Henderson continued to punish the Knights defense. On the second play of their next drive, he blasted for an 82-yard touchdown run, and a 31–14 Tigers lead. With under 4 minutes left in the half, a Memphis punt set UCF deep at their own 6 yard line. Mack threw a 44-yard pass to Gabe Davis, then Greg McCrae broke free for a 47-yard run all the way to the 3 yard line. Mack's 4-yard touchdown pass to Jake Hescock made the score 31–21. The Knights forced a 3-and-out and Memphis punted with 1:50 remaining. But Otis Anderson muffed the punt, and Memphis recovered. With 21 seconds left in the half, Darrell Henderson connected with Sean Dykes for a 4-yard touchdown pass, and the Tigers led 38–21 at halftime.

=== Third quarter ===
UCF received the ball to start the third quarter, and proceeded to dominate the second half. The Knights would score five touchdowns on five consecutive drives, erasing a 17-point deficit, and held the Tigers to only three points in the second half. Darrell Henderson was held to only 3 yards in the second half, while Darriel Mack Jr. threw for a touchdown, and rushed for four more. Mack sparked the rally with a 54-yard touchdown to a wide-open Otis Anderson, who ran untouched to the endzone. Later, Memphis managed to drive to the UCF 2 yard line, but Brady White's pass to the endzone fell incomplete off the fingertips of Damonte Coxie as he hit the ground. The Tigers settled for a field goal, and clung to a 41–35 lead.

=== Fourth quarter ===
The Knights took their first lead of the game (42–41) with a touchdown in the opening seconds of the fourth quarter. With 9:26 remaining, Memphis kicker Riley Patterson missed a 36-yard field goal attempt, and the Knights held their lead. UCF iced the game with two more touchdown, and an interception in the endzone with 33 seconds to go.

Quarterback Darriel Mack Jr., in only his second start for the Knights, finished with 348 yard passing, 2 touchdown passes, 59 yards rushing, and 4 rushing touchdowns, to claim the game's MVP honors. The Knights extended their winning streak to 25 games, and set a new NCAA Division I FBS record with their 25th consecutive game scoring 30 or more points.

== Scoring summary ==
Scoring summary

Quarter	Time	Drive			Team	Scoring information	Score	
Quarter	Time	Plays	Yards	TOP	Team	Scoring information	MEM	UCF
1	13:13	4	77	1:47	MEM	Darrell Henderson 62-yard touchdown run, Riley Patterson kick good	7	0
1	11:55	2	27	0:29	MEM	Darrell Henderson 12-yard touchdown run, Riley Patterson kick good	14	0
1	9:48	7	65	2:07	UCF	Greg McCrae 14-yard touchdown run, Matthew Wright kick good	14	7
1	8:22	3	76	1:26	MEM	Patrick Taylor 70-yard touchdown run, Riley Patterson kick good	21	7
1	1:30	11	32	4:58	MEM	36-yard field goal by Riley Patterson	24	7
2	11:52				UCF	Fumble recovery returned 0 yards for touchdown by Michael Colubiale, Matthew Wright kick good	24	14
2	11:24	2	81	0:28	MEM	Darrell Henderson 82-yard touchdown run, Riley Patterson kick good	31	14
2	2:41	4	94	1:04	UCF	Jake Hescock 4-yard touchdown reception from Darriel Mack, Jr., Matthew Wright kick good	31	21
2	0:21	5	31	1:29	MEM	Sean Dykes 4-yard touchdown reception from Darrell Henderson, Riley Patterson kick good	38	21
3	12:21	7	79	2:39	UCF	Otis Anderson 54-yard touchdown reception from Darriel Mack, Jr., Matthew Wright kick good	38	28
3	6:55	8	45	3:24	UCF	Darriel Mack, Jr. 4-yard touchdown run, Matthew Wright kick good	38	35
3	2:13	11	78	4:42	MEM	19-yard field goal by Riley Patterson	41	35
4	14:28	8	76	2:45	UCF	Darriel Mack, Jr. 2-yard touchdown run, Matthew Wright kick good	41	42
4	6:37	8	71	2:49	UCF	Darriel Mack, Jr. 2-yard touchdown run, Matthew Wright kick good	41	49
4	2:29	8	82	2:37	UCF	Darriel Mack, Jr. 5-yard touchdown run, Matthew Wright kick good	41	56
"TOP" = time of possession. For other American football terms, see Glossary of American football.							41	56

=== Statistics ===
	1	2	3	4	Total
Tigers	24	14	3	0	41
No. 7 Knights	7	14	14	21	56

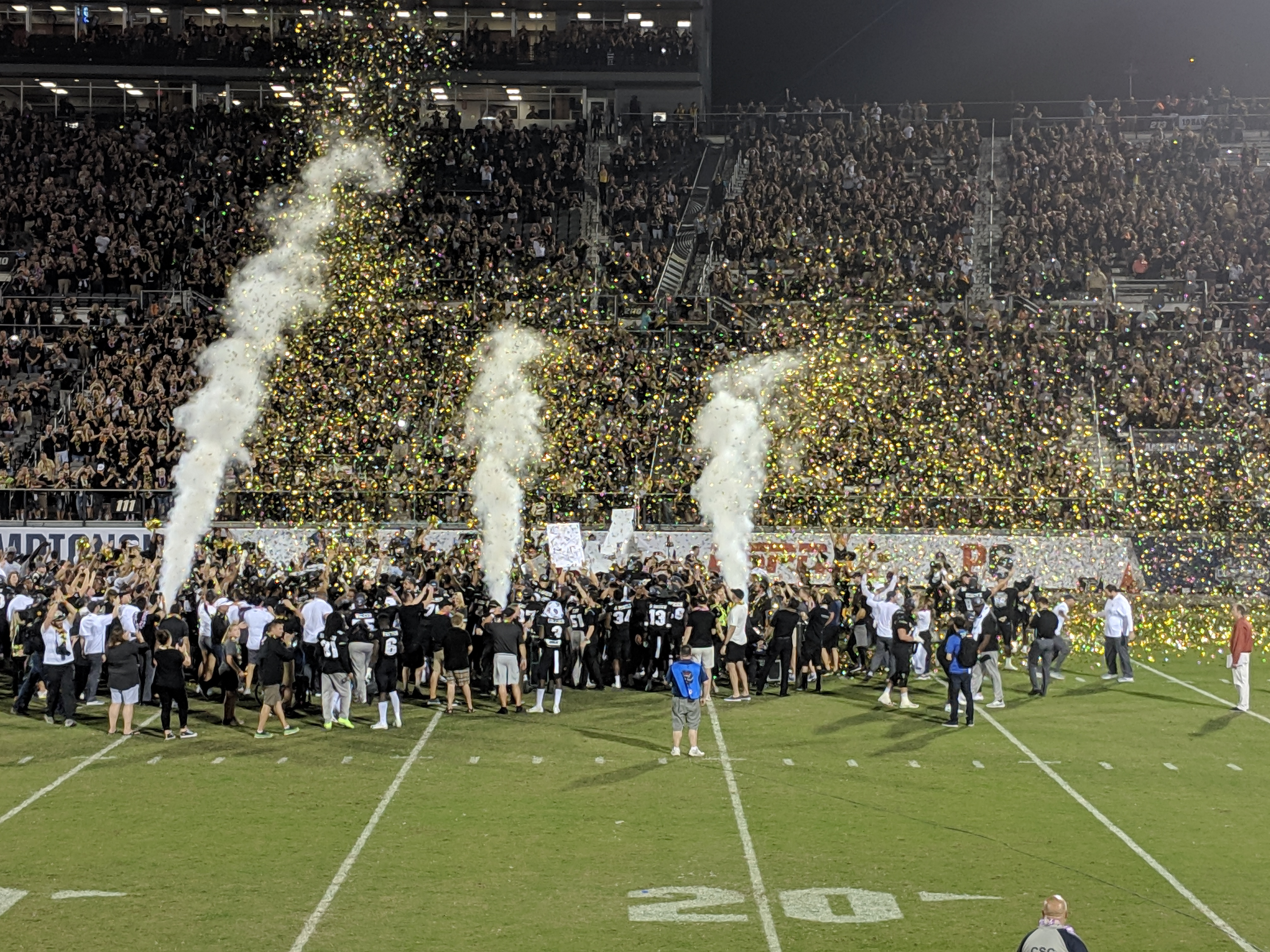
UCF celebrates their victory over Memphis in the AAC Championship Game.

Statistics	MEM	UCF
First downs	23	34
Plays–yards	75–583	90–698
Rushes–yards	45–401	62–350
Passing yards	182	348
Passing: Comp–Att–Int	18–30–1	19–28–0
Time of possession	31:12	28:48

Team	Category	Player	Statistics
Memphis	Passing	Brady White	17/29, 178 yds, 1 INT
Memphis	Rushing	Darrell Henderson	16 car, 210 yds, 3 TD
Memphis	Receiving	Patrick Taylor	4 rec, 23 yds
UCF	Passing	Darriel Mack Jr.	19/27, 348 yds, 2 TD
UCF	Rushing	Greg McCrae	24 car, 208 yds, 1 TD
UCF	Receiving	Gabe Davis	6 rec, 101 yds
