= 2018 South Florida Bulls football team =

American college football season

2018 South Florida Bulls football

Gasparilla Bowl, L 20–38 vs. Marshall
- Conference: American Athletic Conference
- Record: 7–6 (3–5 AAC)
- Head coach: Charlie Strong (2nd season)
- Offensive coordinator: Sterlin Gilbert (2nd season)
- Offensive scheme: Veer and shoot
- Defensive coordinator: Brian Jean-Mary (2nd season)
- Base defense: 3–3–5
- Home stadium: Raymond James Stadium

2018 American Athletic Conference football standings
	Conf.			Overall
Team	W		L	W		L
East Division
No. 11 UCF x$	8	–	0	12	–	1
Temple	7	–	1	8	–	5
No. 24 Cincinnati	6	–	2	11	–	2
South Florida	3	–	5	7	–	6
East Carolina	1	–	7	3	–	9
UConn	0	–	8	1	–	11
West Division
Memphis xy	5	–	3	8	–	6
Houston x	5	–	3	8	–	5
Tulane x	5	–	3	7	–	6
SMU	4	–	4	5	–	7
Navy	2	–	6	3	–	10
Tulsa	2	–	6	3	–	9
Championship: UCF 56, Memphis 41
$ – Conference champion; x – Division champion/co-champions; y – Championship game participant; Rankings from AP Poll

The 2018 South Florida Bulls football team represented the University of South Florida (USF) in the 2018 NCAA Division I FBS football season. They played their home games at Raymond James Stadium in Tampa, Florida, and were led by second-year head coach Charlie Strong. The Bulls competed as members of the East Division of the American Athletic Conference. They finished the season 7–6, 3–5 in AAC play to finish in fourth place in the East Division. They were invited to the Gasparilla Bowl where they lost to Marshall.

The 2018 Bulls became the first team in college football history to start a season 7–0 and lose their final six games.

== Preseason ==
The Bulls replaced 11 starters from a 10-2 season in 2017. One of the biggest storylines of the offseason was the addition of graduate transfer Blake Barnett who was named the starting quarterback following stints at Alabama and Arizona State.

=== Award watch lists ===
Listed in the order that they were released

Award	Player	Position	Year
John Mackey Award	Mitchell Wilcox	TE	JR
Outland Trophy	Marcus Norman	T	JR
Wuerffel Trophy	Jaymon Thomas	DB	SR

=== AAC media poll ===
The AAC media poll was released on July 24, 2018, with the Bulls predicted to finish in second place in the AAC East Division.

Media poll (East)
Predicted finish	Team	Votes (1st place)
1	UCF	175 (25)
2	USF	140 (5)
3	Temple	132
4	Cincinnati	91
5	UConn	51
6	East Carolina	41

== Schedule ==
Date	Time	Opponent	Rank	Site	TV	Result	Attendance
September 1	6:00 p.m.	No. 12 (FCS) Elon*		Raymond James Stadium; Tampa, FL	ESPN3	W 34–14	31,217
September 8	12:00 p.m.	Georgia Tech*		Raymond James Stadium; Tampa, FL	ABC/ESPN2	W 49–38	34,182
September 15	3:30 p.m.	vs. Illinois*		Soldier Field; Chicago, IL	BTN	W 25–19	21,725
September 22	8:00 p.m.	East Carolina		Raymond James Stadium; Tampa, FL	ESPNews	W 20–13	34,562
October 6	3:30 p.m.	at Massachusetts*		Warren McGuirk Alumni Stadium; Hadley, MA	ELVN	W 58–42	7,988
October 12	7:00 p.m.	at Tulsa	No. 23	H. A. Chapman Stadium; Tulsa, OK	ESPN	W 25–24	16,142
October 20	7:00 p.m.	UConn	No. 21	Raymond James Stadium; Tampa, FL	CBSSN	W 38–30	42,127
October 27	3:30 p.m.	at Houston	No. 21	TDECU Stadium; Houston, TX	ABC/ESPN2	L 36–57	31,631
November 3	3:30 p.m.	Tulane		Raymond James Stadium; Tampa, FL	CBSSN	L 15–41	31,388
November 10	7:00 p.m.	at No. 25 Cincinnati		Nippert Stadium; Cincinnati, OH	ESPNU	L 23–35	29,310
November 17	12:00 a.m.	at Temple		Lincoln Financial Field; Philadelphia, PA	ESPNews	L 17–27	21,029
November 23	4:00 p.m.	No. 8 UCF		Raymond James Stadium; Tampa, FL (War on I–4)	ESPN	L 10–38	57,626
December 20	8:00 p.m.	Marshall*		Raymond James Stadium; Tampa, FL (Gasparilla Bowl)	ESPN	L 20–38	14,135
*Non-conference game; Rankings from AP Poll released prior to the game; All times are in Eastern time

Schedule source:

== Game summaries ==
=== Elon ===
	1	2	3	4	Total
No. 12 (FCS) Phoenix	0	0	7	7	14
Bulls	7	17	7	3	34

=== Georgia Tech ===
	1	2	3	4	Total
Yellow Jackets	17	0	14	7	38
Bulls	14	7	7	21	49

=== At Illinois ===
	1	2	3	4	Total
Bulls	7	0	0	18	25
Fighting Illini	10	6	3	0	19

=== East Carolina ===
	1	2	3	4	Total
Pirates	7	3	3	0	13
Bulls	6	7	0	7	20

=== At Massachusetts ===
	1	2	3	4	Total
Bulls	10	10	28	10	58
Minutemen	7	7	14	14	42

=== At Tulsa ===
	1	2	3	4	Total
No. 23 Bulls	3	0	7	15	25
Golden Hurricane	7	3	14	0	24

=== UConn ===
	1	2	3	4	Total
Huskies	7	0	7	16	30
No. 21 Bulls	0	7	17	14	38

=== At Houston ===
	1	2	3	4	Total
No. 21 Bulls	0	21	15	0	36
Cougars	14	14	15	14	57

=== Tulane ===
	1	2	3	4	Total
Green Wave	7	20	7	7	41
Bulls	3	0	6	6	15

=== At Cincinnati ===
	1	2	3	4	Total
Bulls	9	7	7	0	23
No. 25 Bearcats	7	7	21	0	35

=== At Temple ===
	1	2	3	4	Total
Bulls	7	10	0	0	17
Owls	0	0	10	17	27

=== UCF ===
	1	2	3	4	Total
No. 8 Knights	7	10	7	14	38
Bulls	0	3	7	0	10

=== Marshall (Gasparilla Bowl) ===
	1	2	3	4	Total
Thundering Herd	21	7	3	7	38
Bulls	7	3	10	0	20

== Rankings ==
Ranking movements Legend: ██ Increase in ranking ██ Decrease in ranking — = Not ranked RV = Received votes
	Week															
Poll	Pre	1	2	3	4	5	6	7	8	9	10	11	12	13	14	Final
AP	—	—	RV	RV	RV	RV	23	21	21	RV	—	—	—	—	—	—
Coaches	RV	RV	RV	RV	RV	RV	23	20	20	RV	RV	—	—	—	—	—
CFP	Not released									—	—	—	—	—	—	Not released
