= John Dunn (American football) =

American football coach

Green Bay Packers
- Title: Tight ends coach

Personal information
- Born: August 7, 1983 (age 43); Shelby, North Carolina, U.S.
- Listed height: 6 ft 5 in (1.96 m)
- Listed weight: 254 lb (115 kg)

Career information
- Position: Tight end
- College: North Carolina (2001–2003)

Career history
- North Carolina (2004) Senior analyst; North Carolina (2005) Offensive quality control; North Carolina (2006–2007) Graduate assistant; LSU (2008–2010) Graduate assistant; Maryland (2011–2015) Tight ends coach; Chicago Bears (2016) Offensive quality control; Chicago Bears (2017) Offensive assistant; UConn (2018) Associate head coach, offensive coordinator, & quarterbacks coach; New York Jets (2019–2020) Tight ends coach; Green Bay Packers (2021) Senior analyst; Green Bay Packers (2022–present) Tight ends coach

John Dunn (born August 7, 1983) is an American football coach and former player who is the tight ends coach for the Green Bay Packers of the National Football League (NFL). He is the former offensive coordinator at the University of Connecticut. From 2011 to 2015, he was the tight ends coach and recruiting coordinator for former UConn head coach Randy Edsall at the University of Maryland. Dunn has also had stops with the Chicago Bears, LSU, and North Carolina.

== Coaching career ==
=== North Carolina ===
After Dunn's playing career at North Carolina was cut short due to injury, he stayed involved with the program, and the game, as a student assistant as he finished his ungraduated studies in 2004. The next year, in 2005, he served in an offensive quality control role. Dunn then served as an offensive graduate assistant for the 2006 and 2007 seasons.

=== LSU ===
From 2008 to 2010, Dunn served as an offensive graduate assistant for the LSU football team. He worked with offensive line and quarterbacks during his time there.

=== Maryland ===
In 2011, Randy Edsall was hired as the new head coach at Maryland. Edsall hired Dunn as his tight ends coach. Dunn also served as the recruiting coordinator. Dunn was instrumental in Maryland signing two top 35 signing classes in the staffs final three years.

=== Chicago Bears ===
In 2016, Dunn joined the Chicago Bears organization. In his first year, he served as an offensive quality control assistant, and in 2017 he was promoted to an offensive assistant. During his time with the Bears, Dunn assisted with the quarterbacks and wide receivers, as well as self scouting and pass protection game planning.

=== UConn ===
In December 2017, Dunn was announced as the new associate head coach, offensive coordinator, and quarterback coach at UConn, re-uniting him with Head coach Randy Edsall. Dunn was originally on a two-year contract, earning $300,000 per year. After the 2018 season, Randy Edsall took a $150,000 pay cut, in order to give Dunn a $150,000 pay raise.

=== New York Jets ===
On February 8, 2019, Footballscoop.com reported that Dunn was leaving UConn to rejoin new Jets head coach, Adam Gase.

=== Green Bay Packers ===
On March 1, 2021, the Green Bay Packers hired Dunn as a senior analyst, working closely with defensive coordinator Joe Barry and the team’s inside linebackers, in addition to self-scouting the team’s defense. On February 5, 2022, Dunn was promoted to tight ends coach.

== Playing career ==
Dunn was a walk-on quarterback at North Carolina before moving to tight end. He played from 2001 to 2003 and lettered in 2003, before a neck injury ended his playing career.

== Personal life ==
Dunn and his wife, Lindsay, have two children, Carter and Emerson.
