= Darrell Henderson =

American football player (born 1997)

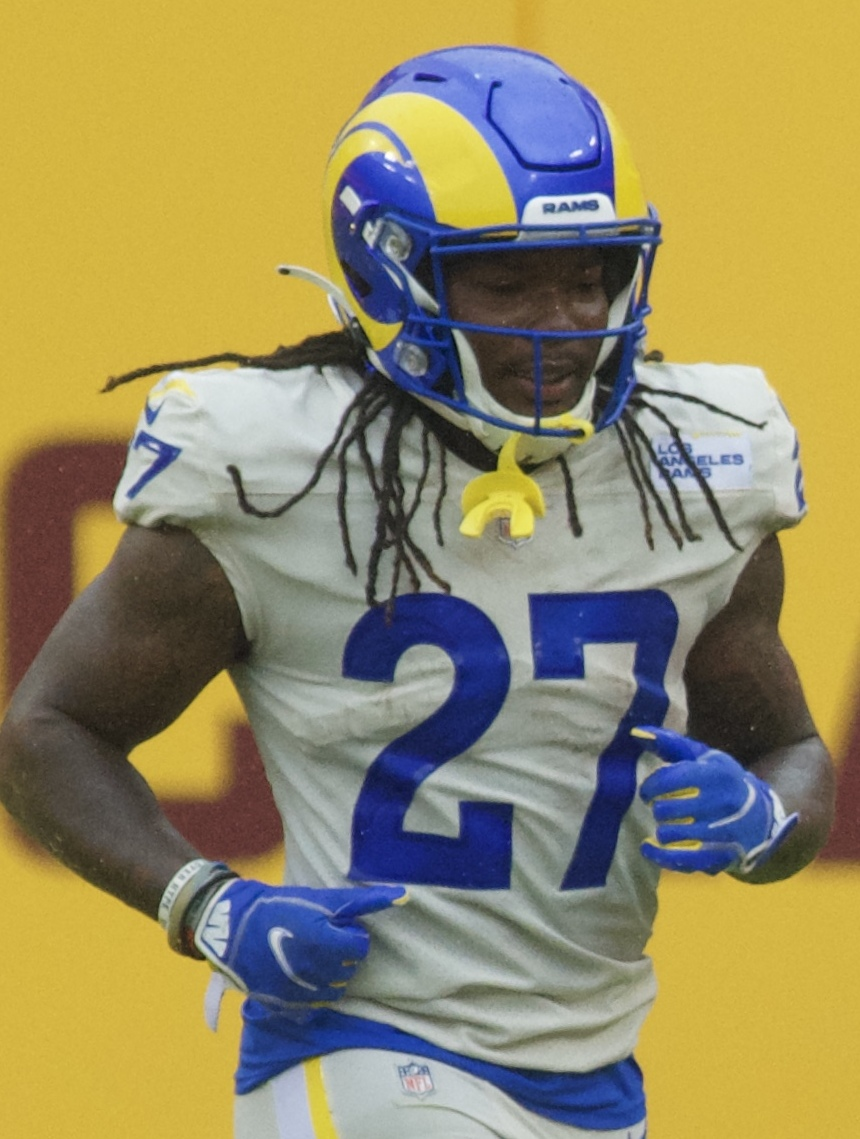
- Henderson with the Los Angeles Rams in 2020

No. 27
- Position: Running back

Personal information
- Born: August 19, 1997 (age 29); Batesville, Mississippi, U.S.
- Listed height: 5 ft 8 in (1.73 m)
- Listed weight: 208 lb (94 kg)

Career information
- High school: South Panola (MS)
- College: Memphis (2016–2018)
- NFL draft: 2019: 3rd round, 70th overall pick

Career history
- Los Angeles Rams (2019–2022); Jacksonville Jaguars (2022); Los Angeles Rams (2023); Saskatchewan Roughriders (2026)*
- * Offseason or practice squad member only

Awards and highlights
- Super Bowl champion (LVI); Consensus All-American (2018); Jim Brown Award (2018); First-team All-AAC (2018); Second-team All-AAC (2017)

Career NFL statistics
- Rushing yards: 1,854
- Rushing average: 4.2
- Rushing touchdowns: 15
- Receptions: 76
- Receiving yards: 577
- Receiving touchdowns: 4
- Stats at Pro Football Reference

Darrell Henderson Jr. (born August 19, 1997) is an American professional football running back who is a free agent. He played college football for the Memphis Tigers, and was selected by the Los Angeles Rams in the third round of the 2019 NFL draft.

== Early life ==
Henderson attended South Panola High School in Batesville, Mississippi. During his high school football career, he rushed for 5,801 yards and scored 68 touchdowns. He committed to the University of Memphis to play college football.

== College career ==
As a freshman at Memphis in 2016, Henderson played in all 13 games with six starts. He finished the season with 482 yards on 87 carries with five touchdowns.

As a sophomore in 2017, Henderson played in 12 games with 10 starts and rushed for 1,154 yards on 130 carries with nine touchdowns. He missed the 2017 Liberty Bowl due to an injury. Henderson returned as the starter for Memphis in 2018. Henderson had a breakout season in 2018, rushing for 1,909 yards and 22 touchdowns on 214 carries. He finished 10th in Heisman Trophy, becoming the first Memphis player in 13 years to finish in the top ten in votes. On December 12, 2018, Henderson opted to forgo the remainder of his collegiate career and declared for the 2019 NFL draft.

== Professional career ==
Pre-draft measurables
Height	Weight	Arm length	Hand span	40-yard dash	10-yard split	20-yard split	20-yard shuttle	Three-cone drill	Vertical jump	Broad jump	Bench press
5 ft 8 3/8 in (1.74 m)	208 lb (94 kg)	31 in (0.79 m)	8 5/8 in (0.22 m)	4.49 s	1.59 s	2.48 s	4.41 s	7.03 s	33.5 in (0.85 m)	10 ft 1 in (3.07 m)	22 reps
All values from NFL Combine/Pro Day

=== Los Angeles Rams (first stint) ===
Henderson was selected by the Los Angeles Rams in the third round with the 70th overall pick in the 2019 NFL Draft. He was placed on injured reserve on December 28, 2019. He finished the season with 39 carries for 147 rushing yards and no touchdowns along with four catches for 37 yards through 13 games.

In Week 2 of the 2020 season against the Philadelphia Eagles, he rushed for 81 yards on 12 carries and his first career rushing touchdown in the 37–19 win. In Week 3, against the Buffalo Bills, he had 20 carries for 114 rushing yards and one rushing touchdown in the 35–32 loss. In Week 16, Henderson suffered a high ankle sprain and was placed on injured reserve on December 29, 2020. He finished the season as the Rams second leading rusher with 624 rushing yards and five rushing touchdowns along with 16 receptions for 159 yards and one receiving touchdown through 15 games and 11 starts.

Henderson entered the 2021 season as the Rams' starting running back. In Week 1, he rushed for 70 yards and one touchdown. In Week 6, he rushed for 78 yards and a touchdown along with two catches for 29 yards and a touchdown. In Week 8, he rushed for a season-high 90 yards and one touchdown along with a three-yard touchdown reception. He suffered an MCL sprain in Week 16 and was placed on injured reserve on December 28. He finished the regular season with a career-high 688 yards and five rushing touchdowns and 29 catches for 176 yards and three touchdowns. He was activated off injured reserve on February 11, 2022 in time for Super Bowl LVI. In the Super Bowl, Henderson had four carries for seven yards and caught three receptions for 43 yards in the 23–20 win against the Cincinnati Bengals.

Henderson entered the 2022 season as the Rams starting running back. He was waived by the Rams on November 22, 2022.

=== Jacksonville Jaguars ===
On November 23, 2022, Henderson was claimed off waivers by the Jacksonville Jaguars. He was waived on December 9, 2022.

=== Los Angeles Rams (second stint) ===
On October 17, 2023, Henderson was signed to the Rams practice squad. He was signed to the active roster on November 1, 2023. He was waived on November 21, 2023, and was re-signed to the practice squad the next day. Henderson was released on December 26.

=== Saskatchewan Roughriders ===
On February 13, 2026, Henderson signed with the Saskatchewan Roughriders in the Canadian Football League after his cousin Jermarcus Hardrick convinced him to try out. Henderson was cut during training camp on May 13, 2026.
