= Brady White =

American football player (born 1996)

Florida State Seminoles
- Title: Assistant wide receivers coach

Personal information
- Born: August 15, 1996 (age 30); Santa Clarita, California, U.S.
- Listed height: 6 ft 1 in (1.85 m)
- Listed weight: 215 lb (98 kg)

Career information
- High school: Hart (Santa Clarita)
- College: Arizona State (2015–2017); Memphis (2018–2020)
- NFL draft: 2021: undrafted

Career history

Playing
- TSL Alphas (2021); Tampa Bay Bandits (2022); Memphis Showboats (2023)

Coaching
- Memphis (2022) Graduate Assistant; Arizona State (2024–2025) Assistant wide receivers coach; Florida State (2026–present) Assistant wide receivers coach

Awards and highlights
- William V. Campbell Trophy (2020); Second-team All-AAC (2019)
- Stats at Pro Football Reference

Brady White (born August 15, 1996) is an American professional football quarterback. He began his college football career with the Arizona State Sun Devils, before becoming a graduate transfer to the Memphis Tigers.

== Early life ==
White was unanimously rated a four-star recruit and a top-10 national quarterback prospect by every major publication. Selected to participate in the U.S. Army All-American Bowl, White was the starting quarterback for the West. He was one of 16 nominees for the U.S. Army National Player of the Year in 2014 and threw for 3,725 yards with 45 passing touchdowns in 12 games as a senior, earning Second-Team All-America honors by MaxPreps as a junior. He is regarded as one of ASU's highest recruits.

== College career ==
=== Arizona State ===
As a freshman White was injured and missed most of his first and all of his second season. He earned his bachelor's degree in business from Arizona State in December 2017.

=== Memphis ===
After graduating from Arizona State, White announced on January 16, 2018, that he was going to be a graduate transfer to the University of Memphis. In May 2019, he was granted an extra year of eligibility due to his injury at ASU. Earning his master's degree in sports commerce in August 2019, White enrolled in the university's doctoral program in liberal studies in Fall 2019.

In 2020, White led the Tigers to an 8–3 record and a Montgomery Bowl victory. Starting all 11 games of the season, he completed 254 of 420 passes for 3,380 yards, with 31 touchdowns and 10 interceptions.

For his career at Memphis, White set career school records in wins as a starting quarterback (28), passing yards (10,690) and passing touchdowns (90).

On January 6, 2021, the National Football Foundation (NFF) and College Football Hall of Fame awarded White the William V. Campbell Trophy as the top college football scholar-athlete in the nation.

=== Statistics ===
Year	Team	Games			Passing								Rushing			
Year	Team	GP	GS	Record	Cmp	Att	Pct	Yds	Avg	TD	INT	Rtg	Att	Yds	Avg	TD
2015	Arizona State	Redshirt														
2016	Arizona State	4	1	1–0	25	49	51.0	259	5.3	2	1	104.8	3	3	1.0	0
2017	Arizona State	Medical redshirt														
2018	Memphis	14	14	8–6	246	392	62.8	3,296	8.4	26	9	150.7	53	-43	-0.8	1
2019	Memphis	14	14	12–2	269	420	64.0	4,014	9.6	33	11	165.0	61	-71	-1.2	4
2020	Memphis	11	11	8–3	254	420	60.5	3,380	8.0	31	10	147.7	63	88	1.4	2
Career		43	40	29–11	794	1,281	62.0	10,949	8.5	92	31	152.6	180	-23	-0.1	7

== Professional career ==
Pre-draft measurables
Height	Weight	Arm length	Hand span	40-yard dash	10-yard split	20-yard split	20-yard shuttle	Three-cone drill	Vertical jump
6 ft 1 in (1.85 m)	210 lb (95 kg)	31 1/2 in (0.80 m)	10 1/8 in (0.26 m)	4.84 s	1.70 s	2.74 s	4.33 s	6.97 s	29.0 in (0.74 m)
All values from Pro Day

After going undrafted in the 2021 NFL draft, White received an invitation to the Tennessee Titans rookie minicamp, but did not receive a contract.

=== Tampa Bay Bandits ===
White was selected with the seventh pick of the 12th round of the 2022 USFL draft by the Tampa Bay Bandits.

=== Memphis Showboats ===
On November 15, 2022, when the USFL announced the Memphis Showboats, White, and every other Tampa Bay Bandit player was transferred to the Showboats. In the leadup to the opening week of play, White was announced as the team's starting quarterback. He became a free agent after the 2023 season.

== Coaching career ==
In January 2024, White was announced to be the assistant wide receivers coach for the Arizona State Sun Devils, rejoining his former college quarterback coach and now Arizona State head coach, Kenny Dillingham.

On January 12, 2026, White was announced to be the assistant wide receivers coach for the Florida State Seminoles.
