= 2017 Peach Bowl =

The 2017 Peach Bowl may refer to one of the following college football bowl games:

- 2016 Peach Bowl, played between the Washington Huskies and the Alabama Crimson Tide.
- 2018 Peach Bowl (January), played between the UCF Knights and the Auburn Tigers.
