= 2017 Auburn Tigers football team =

American college football season

2017 Auburn Tigers football

SEC Western Division co-champion

SEC Championship Game, L 7–28 vs. Georgia

Peach Bowl, L 27–34 vs. UCF
- Conference: Southeastern Conference
- Western Division

Ranking
- Coaches: No. 12
- AP: No. 10
- Record: 10–4 (7–1 SEC)
- Head coach: Gus Malzahn (5th season)
- Offensive coordinator: Chip Lindsey (1st season)
- Co-offensive coordinator: Kodi Burns (2nd season)
- Offensive scheme: Multiple offense, Hurry-up offense
- Defensive coordinator: Kevin Steele (2nd season)
- Home stadium: Jordan Hare Stadium

2017 Southeastern Conference football standings
	Conf.			Overall
Team	W		L	W		L
Eastern Division
No. 2 Georgia x$^	7	–	1	13	–	2
South Carolina	5	–	3	9	–	4
Kentucky	4	–	4	7	–	6
Missouri	4	–	4	7	–	6
Florida	3	–	5	4	–	7
Vanderbilt	1	–	7	5	–	7
Tennessee	0	–	8	4	–	8
Western Division
No. 10 Auburn xy	7	–	1	10	–	4
No. 1 Alabama x#^	7	–	1	13	–	1
No. 18 LSU	6	–	2	9	–	4
No. 19 Mississippi State	4	–	4	9	–	4
Texas A&M	4	–	4	7	–	6
Ole Miss*	3	–	5	6	–	6
Arkansas	1	–	7	4	–	8
Championship: Georgia 28, Auburn 7
# – College Football Playoff champion; ^ – College Football Playoff participant; $ – Conference champion; x – Division champion/co-champions; y – Championship game participant; * Ole Miss ineligible for postseason due to NCAA sanctions; Rankings from AP Poll

The 2017 Auburn Tigers football team represented Auburn University in the 2017 NCAA Division I FBS football season. The Tigers played their home games at Jordan–Hare Stadium in Auburn, Alabama and competed in the Western Division of the Southeastern Conference (SEC). They were led by fifth-year head coach Gus Malzahn. Auburn finished the season 10–4 overall and 7–1 in SEC play to win a share of the Western Division title with Alabama. Due to their head-to-head win over Alabama, they represented the Western Division in the SEC Championship Game where they lost to Georgia. They were invited to the Peach Bowl, where they lost to American Athletic Conference champion UCF.

== Recruiting ==
=== Position key ===
Back	B	Center	C	Cornerback	CB	Defensive back	DB
Defensive end	DE	Defensive lineman	DL	Defensive tackle	DT	End	E
Fullback	FB	Guard	G	Halfback	HB	Kicker	K
Kickoff returner	KR	Offensive tackle	OT	Offensive lineman	OL	Linebacker	LB
Long snapper	LS	Punter	P	Punt returner	PR	Quarterback	QB
Running back	RB	Safety	S	Tight end	TE	Wide receiver	WR

=== Recruits ===
The Tigers signed a total of 23 recruits.

College recruiting information (2017)
Name	Hometown	School	Height	Weight	Commit date
Calvin Ashley; OT	Washington, D.C.	St. John's College HS	6 ft 6 in (1.98 m)	310 lb (140 kg)	May 30, 2015
Calvin Ashley; OT	Recruit ratings: Scout: Rivals: 247Sports: ESPN:				
Alaric Williams; RB	Gadsden, Alabama	Southside HS	6 ft 0 in (1.83 m)	195 lb (88 kg)	Jul 25, 2015
Alaric Williams; RB	Recruit ratings: Scout: Rivals: 247Sports: ESPN:				
Carlito Gonzalez; S	Stone Mountain, Georgia	Stephenson HS	6 ft 1 in (1.85 m)	188 lb (85 kg)	Aug 8, 2015
Carlito Gonzalez; S	Recruit ratings: Scout: Rivals: 247Sports: ESPN:				
Tadarian Moultry; LB	Birmingham, Alabama	Jackson-Olin HS	6 ft 2 in (1.88 m)	225 lb (102 kg)	May 6, 2016
Tadarian Moultry; LB	Recruit ratings: Scout: Rivals: 247Sports: ESPN:				
Chandler Wooten; LB	Kennesaw, Georgia	North Cobb HS	6 ft 3 in (1.91 m)	227 lb (103 kg)	May 13, 2016
Chandler Wooten; LB	Recruit ratings: Scout: Rivals: 247Sports: ESPN:				
Malcolm Askew; CB	Birmingham, Alabama	McAdory HS	5 ft 10 in (1.78 m)	176 lb (80 kg)	Jun 4, 2016
Malcolm Askew; CB	Recruit ratings: Scout: Rivals: 247Sports: ESPN:				
Bill Taylor; LS	Tuscaloosa, Alabama	American Christian Academy	6 ft 4 in (1.93 m)	235 lb (107 kg)	Jun 13, 2016
Bill Taylor; LS	Recruit ratings: Scout: Rivals: 247Sports: ESPN:				
Austin Troxell; OT	Madison, Alabama	Madison Academy	6 ft 7 in (2.01 m)	335 lb (152 kg)	Jun 18, 2016
Austin Troxell; OT	Recruit ratings: Scout: Rivals: 247Sports: ESPN:				
Anders Carlson; K	Colorado Springs, Colorado	The Classic Academy	6 ft 3 in (1.91 m)	185 lb (84 kg)	Jun 25, 2016
Anders Carlson; K	Recruit ratings: Scout: Rivals: 247Sports: ESPN:				
Nick Brahms; OG	Navarre, Florida	Navarre HS	6 ft 4 in (1.93 m)	285 lb (129 kg)	Jul 9, 2016
Nick Brahms; OG	Recruit ratings: Scout: Rivals: 247Sports: ESPN:				
Devan Barrett; RB	Tampa, Florida	Tampa Catholic HS	6 ft 0 in (1.83 m)	190 lb (86 kg)	Jul 28, 2016
Devan Barrett; RB	Recruit ratings: Scout: Rivals: 247Sports: ESPN:				
Jordyn Peters; S	Muscle Shoals, Alabama	Muscle Shoals HS	6 ft 2 in (1.88 m)	185 lb (84 kg)	Aug 19, 2016
Jordyn Peters; S	Recruit ratings: Scout: Rivals: 247Sports: ESPN:				
K. J. Britt; LB	Oxford, Alabama	Oxford HS	6 ft 0 in (1.83 m)	232 lb (105 kg)	Oct 31, 2016
K. J. Britt; LB	Recruit ratings: Scout: Rivals: 247Sports: ESPN:				
Noah Igbinoghene; WR	Birmingham, Alabama	Hewitt-Trussville HS	6 ft 0 in (1.83 m)	190 lb (86 kg)	Nov 24, 2016
Noah Igbinoghene; WR	Recruit ratings: Scout: Rivals: 247Sports: ESPN:				
Jarrett Stidham; QB	Stephenville, Texas	McLennan Community College	6 ft 6 in (1.98 m)	330 lb (150 kg)	Dec 10, 2016
Jarrett Stidham; QB	Recruit ratings: Scout: Rivals: 247Sports: ESPN:				
Traivon Leonard; CB	West Palm Beach, Florida	Oxbridge Academy	6 ft 0 in (1.83 m)	188 lb (85 kg)	Dec 12, 2016
Traivon Leonard; CB	Recruit ratings: Scout: Rivals: 247Sports: ESPN:				
Salvatore Cannella; TE	Chicago	Scottsdale Community College	6 ft 6 in (1.98 m)	230 lb (100 kg)	Dec 14, 2016
Salvatore Cannella; TE	Recruit ratings: Scout: Rivals: 247Sports: ESPN:				
Alec Jackson; DT	Montgomery, Alabama	Jefferson Davis HS	6 ft 5 in (1.96 m)	270 lb (120 kg)	Dec 25, 2016
Alec Jackson; DT	Recruit ratings: Scout: Rivals: 247Sports: ESPN:				
Malik Willis; QB	Roswell, Georgia	Roswell HS	6 ft 2 in (1.88 m)	188 lb (85 kg)	Dec 30, 2016
Malik Willis; QB	Recruit ratings: Scout: Rivals: 247Sports: ESPN:				
John Samuel Shenker; TE	Moultrie, Georgia	Colquitt County HS	6 ft 3 in (1.91 m)	245 lb (111 kg)	Jan 29, 2017
John Samuel Shenker; TE	Recruit ratings: Scout: Rivals: 247Sports: ESPN:				
Tyrone Truesdell; DT	Augusta, Georgia	Laney HS	6 ft 3 in (1.91 m)	325 lb (147 kg)	Feb 1, 2017
Tyrone Truesdell; DT	Recruit ratings: Scout: Rivals: 247Sports: ESPN:				
JaTarvious Whitlow; RB	LaFayette, Alabama	LaFayette HS	6 ft 0 in (1.83 m)	205 lb (93 kg)	Feb 1, 2017
JaTarvious Whitlow; RB	Recruit ratings: Scout: Rivals: 247Sports: ESPN:				
Markaviest Bryant; DE	Cordele, Georgia	Crisp County HS	6 ft 4 in (1.93 m)	226 lb (103 kg)	Feb 1, 2017
Markaviest Bryant; DE	Recruit ratings: Scout: Rivals: 247Sports: ESPN:				
Overall recruit ranking:
Note: In many cases, Scout, Rivals, 247Sports, On3, and ESPN may conflict in their listings of height and weight.; In these cases, the average was taken. ESPN grades are on a 100-point scale.; Sources: "Auburn Football Commitments". Rivals.; "2017 Auburn Football Commits". Scout.; "ESPN". ESPN.; "Scout.com Team Recruiting Rankings". Scout.; "2017 Team Ranking". Rivals.com.

== Schedule ==
Auburn's 2017 schedule was announced on September 13, 2016. It consisted of 7 home games and 5 away games in the regular season. Auburn hosted SEC opponents Alabama, Georgia, Mississippi State, and Ole Miss, and the Tigers traveled to Arkansas, LSU, Missouri, and Texas A&M. The Tigers hosted three of their four non–conference games: Mercer from the Southern Conference and Georgia Southern and Louisiana–Monroe, both from the Sun Belt Conference. Auburn traveled to Clemson of the Atlantic Coast Conference. Auburn had seven home games during this season because it was playing non-conference Clemson on the road, a return date for Clemson's visit to Jordan–Hare in 2016.

Date	Time	Opponent	Rank	Site	TV	Result	Attendance
September 2	6:30 p.m.	Georgia Southern*	No. 12	Jordan–Hare Stadium; Auburn, AL	SECN	W 41–7	87,451
September 9	6:00 p.m.	at No. 3 Clemson*	No. 13	Memorial Stadium; Clemson, SC (rivalry)	ESPN	L 6–14	81,799
September 16	3:00 p.m.	Mercer*^{†}	No. 15	Jordan–Hare Stadium; Auburn, AL	SECN	W 24–10	87,033
September 23	6:30 p.m.	at Missouri	No. 15	Faurot Field; Columbia, MO	ESPNU	W 51–14	54,574
September 30	5:00 p.m.	No. 24 Mississippi State	No. 13	Jordan–Hare Stadium; Auburn, AL	ESPN	W 49–10	86,901
October 7	11:00 a.m.	Ole Miss	No. 12	Jordan–Hare Stadium; Auburn, AL (rivalry)	SECN	W 44–23	86,700
October 14	2:30 p.m.	at LSU	No. 10	Tiger Stadium; Baton Rouge, LA (rivalry)	CBS	L 23–27	101,601
October 21	6:30 p.m.	at Arkansas	No. 21	Donald W. Reynolds Razorback Stadium; Fayetteville, AR	SECN	W 52–20	71,961
November 4	11:00 a.m.	at Texas A&M	No. 14	Kyle Field; College Station, TX	ESPN	W 42–27	100,257
November 11	2:30 p.m.	No. 1 Georgia	No. 10	Jordan–Hare Stadium; Auburn, AL (Deep South's Oldest Rivalry, SEC Nation)	CBS	W 40–17	87,451
November 18	11:00 a.m.	Louisiana–Monroe*	No. 6	Jordan–Hare Stadium; Auburn, AL	ESPN2	W 42–14	82,133
November 25	2:30 p.m.	No. 1 Alabama	No. 6	Jordan–Hare Stadium; Auburn, AL (Iron Bowl, College GameDay)	CBS	W 26–14	87,451
December 2	3:00 p.m.	vs. No. 6 Georgia	No. 2	Mercedes–Benz Stadium; Atlanta, GA (SEC Championship Game, SEC Nation)	CBS	L 7–28	76,534
January 1	11:30 a.m.	vs. No. 12 UCF*	No. 7	Mercedes–Benz Stadium; Atlanta, GA (Peach Bowl)	ESPN	L 27–34	71,109
*Non-conference game; ^{†}Homecoming; Rankings from AP Poll and CFP Rankings after October 31 released prior to game; All times are in Central time

== Game summaries ==
=== Georgia Southern ===
Georgia Southern Eagles at #12 Auburn Tigers – Game summary

Quarter	1	2	3	4	Total
Georgia Southern	7	0	0	0	7
#12 Auburn	10	14	10	7	41

at Jordan–Hare Stadium • Auburn, Alabama

- Date: September 2, 2017
- Game time: 6:39 p.m.
- Game weather: Temperature: 85° • Wind: NW4 • Weather: Sunny
- Game attendance: 87,451
- Referee: Ken Williamson
- TV announcers (SEC Network): Tom Hart (play-by-play), Jordan Rodgers (analyst), Cole Cubelic (sideline reporter)

Game information

First Quarter

- AUB – Daniel Carlson 50 yd field goal, 12:01 (AUB 3–0)
- AUB – Kerryon Johnson 60 yd run (Daniel Carlson kick), 5:11 (AUB 10–0)
- GASO – Tomarcio Reese 22 yd fumble return (Tyler Bass kick), 0:36 (AUB 10–7)

Second Quarter

- AUB – Jarrett Stidham 14 yd run (Daniel Carlson kick), 8:36 (AUB 17–7)
- AUB – Kam Martin 36 yd run (Daniel Carlson kick), 4:52 (AUB 24–7)

Third Quarter

- AUB – Ryan Davis 19 yd pass from Jarrett Stidham (Daniel Carlson kick), 10:56 (AUB 31–7)
- AUB – Daniel Carlson 37 yd field goal, 5:20 (AUB 34–7)

Fourth Quarter

- AUB – Will Hastings 19 yd pass from Jarrett Stidham (Daniel Carlson kick), 9:18 (AUB 41–7)

Top Passers

- GASO − Shai Werts - 4–8, 8 yds, 1 INT
- AUB – Jarrett Stidham - 14–24, 185 yds, 2 TD, 1 INT

Top Rushers

- GASO – L.A. Ramsby - 11 carries, 33 yds
- AUB – Kerryon Johnson - 16 carries, 136 yds, 1 TD

Top Receivers

- GASO – Obe Fortune - 1 reception, 7 yds
- AUB – Will Hastings - 4 receptions, 68 yds, 1 TD

Auburn opened the season against Georgia Southern. Prior to this meeting, the two teams had only met once, a 32–17 victory for Auburn in the 1991 season. Auburn suspended QB Sean White, RB Kamryn Pettway, and WR Kyle Davis prior to this game. The Tigers struggled on offense early, turning the ball over 3 times in the first half. However, in the second half the Tigers started to find their rhythm. On defense, however, the Tigers never struggled. The Tigers held the Eagles to 78 yards and no third down conversions on 15 attempts and allowed no points (the only Georgia Southern score was a fumble return). Auburn now leads the all-time series 2–0 and has never lost to a Sun Belt Conference team (26–0).

=== Clemson ===
#13 Auburn Tigers at #3 Clemson Tigers – Game summary

Quarter	1	2	3	4	Total
#13 Auburn	3	3	0	0	6
#3 Clemson	0	7	7	0	14

at Memorial Stadium • Clemson, South Carolina

- Date: September 9, 2017
- Game time: 6:05 p.m.
- Game weather: Temperature: 75 °F (24 °C) • Wind: ENE 9 mph (14 km/h) • Weather: Clear
- Game attendance: 81,799
- Referee: Matt Loeffler
- TV announcers (ESPN): Steve Levy (play-by-play), Brian Griese (analyst), Todd McShay (sideline reporter)

Game information

First Quarter

- AUB – Daniel Carlson 24 yd field goal. 7:13 (AUB 3–0)

Second Quarter

- AUB – Daniel Carlson 28 yd field goal, 14:17 (AUB 6–0)
- CLEM – Kelly Bryant 3 yd run (Greg Huegel kick), 0:48 (CLEM 7–6)

Third Quarter

- CLEM – Kelly Bryant 27 yd run (Greg Huegel kick), 11:48 (CLEM 14–6)

Fourth Quarter

Top Passers

- AUB – Jarrett Stidham - 13–24, 79 yds
- CLEM – Kelly Bryant - 19–29, 181 yds

Top Rushers

- AUB – Kamryn Pettway - 22 carries, 74 yds
- CLEM – Kelly Bryant - 19 carries, 59 yds, 2 TD

Top Receivers

- AUB – Ryan Davis - 8 receptions, 32 yds
- CLEM – Hunter Renfrow - 9 receptions, 62 yds

Auburn had one of their worst offensive performances in recent memory in a 14–6 loss at the defending national champions, Clemson. The Tigers only mustered 117 yards of offense. The offensive line allowed 11 sacks on the night, one short of the Clemson record of 12 in a game. The defense was a bright spot, though, as Auburn held Clemson to its lowest point total since November 15, 2014 and stopped Clemson's run game effectively, though Clemson was able to convert on third down many times due to the passing game. The Tigers' 6 points were the fewest since they were shut out at Alabama in 2012.

=== Mercer ===
Mercer Bears at #15 Auburn Tigers – Game summary

Quarter	1	2	3	4	Total
Mercer	0	3	0	7	10
#15 Auburn	7	3	7	7	24

at Jordan–Hare Stadium • Auburn, Alabama

- Date: September 16, 2017
- Game time: 3:01 p.m.
- Game weather: Temperature: 85° • Wind: 4 mph NE • Weather: Cloudy
- Game attendance: 87,033
- Referee: David Smith
- TV announcers (SEC Network Alternate): Joel Meyers (play-by-play), Brian Kinchen (analyst), Gabe Gross (sideline reporter)

Game information

First Quarter

- AUB – Kamryn Pettway 4 yd run (Daniel Carlson kick), 1:03 (AUB 7–0)

Second Quarter

- MER – Cole Fisher 21 yd field goal, 5:09 (AUB 7–3)
- AUB – Daniel Carlson 29 yd field goal, 0:37 (AUB 10–3)

Third Quarter

- AUB – Kamryn Pettway 9 yd run (Daniel Carlson kick), 8:06 (AUB 17–3)

Fourth Quarter

- MER – Marquise Irvin 7 yd pass from Kaelan Riley (Cole Fisher kick), 13:48 (AUB 17–10)
- AUB – Kamryn Pettway 4 yd run (Daniel Carlson kick), 4:50 (AUB 24–10)

Top Passers

- MER – Kaelan Riley – 20–32, 146 yds, 1 TD
- AUB – Jarrett Stidham – 32–37, 364 yds

Top Rushers

- MER – CJ Leggett – 11 carries, 39 yds
- AUB – Kamryn Pettway – 34 carries, 128 yds, 3 TD

Top Receivers

- MER – Marquise Irvin – 6 receptions, 65 yds, 1 TD
- AUB – Ryan Davis – 9 receptions, 68 yds

The third game of the season was against the Mercer Bears. It was Auburn's first game against Mercer since the 1922 season. Many people expected it to be a blowout, but Mercer kept it close throughout the game. Auburn's offense performed much better than the previous game, totaling 510 yards, and quarterback Jarrett Stidham had his best game completing 32 of 37 passes for 364 yards, which was the second most completions thrown by an Auburn quarterback in a game, only behind Patrick Nix against Arkansas in 1995. Turnovers, however, plagued the offense, which committed 5 turnovers, including 4 fumbles (2 of which were in the red zone). The defense once again played well, holding the Bears to just 10 points, just 246 total yards, and only 3.7 yards per play.

=== Missouri ===
#15 Auburn Tigers at Missouri Tigers – Game summary

Quarter	1	2	3	4	Total
#15 Auburn	14	17	17	3	51
Missouri	0	7	0	7	14

at Faurot Field • Columbia, Missouri

- Date: September 23, 2017
- Game time: 6:35 p.m.
- Game weather: Temperature: 82° • Wind: S 10–15 • Weather: Warm
- Game attendance: 54,574
- Referee: Matt Austin
- TV announcers (ESPNU): Mark Neely (play-by-play), Ray Bentley (analyst)

Game information

First Quarter

- AUB – Kerryon Johnson 1 yd run (Daniel Carlson kick), 10:44 (AUB 7–0)
- AUB – Kerryon Johnson 2 yd run (Daniel Carlson kick), 8:07 (AUB 14–0)

Second Quarter

- AUB – Kerryon Johnson 1 yd run (Daniel Carlson kick), 13:32 (AUB 21–0)
- AUB – Kerryon Johnson 7 yd run (Daniel Carlson kick), 7:45 (AUB 28–0)
- MIZZ – Damarea Crockett 19 yd pass from Drew Lock (Tucker McCann kick), 4:06 (AUB 28–7)
- AUB – Daniel Carlson 41 yd field goal, 1:45 (AUB 31–7)

Third Quarter

- AUB – Kerryon Johnson 1 yd run (Daniel Carlson kick), 10:35 (AUB 38–7)
- AUB – Nate Craig-Myers 57 yd pass from Jarrett Stidham (Daniel Carlson kick), 9:21 (AUB 45–7)
- AUB – Daniel Carlson 52 yd field goal, 2:25 (AUB 48–7)

Fourth Quarter

- AUB – Daniel Carlson 54 yd field goal, 13:24 (AUB 51–7)
- MIZZ – J'Mon Moore 25 yd pass from Drew Lock (Tucker McCann kick), 12:15 (AUB 51–14)

Top Passers

- AUB – Jarrett Stidham - 13–17, 218 yds, 1 TD
- MIZZ – Drew Lock - 23–39, 216 yds, 2 TD

Top Rushers

- AUB – Kam Martin - 9 carries, 74 yds
- MIZZ – Damarea Crockett - 13 carries, 57 yds

Top Receivers

- AUB – Ryan Davis - 4 receptions, 21 yds
- MIZZ – Johnathon Johnson - 10 receptions, 85 yds

The fourth game of the season was the first conference game for Auburn. In their most complete performance of the year, the visiting Tigers routed Missouri 51–14. Kerryon Johnson, in his first game back from an injury sustained in the first game, rushed for 5 touchdowns, one off the Auburn single game record of 6 held by Cadillac Williams. Daniel Carlson, after some early season struggles, made 3 field goals, including 2 from longer than 50 yards. It was Auburn's first game ever in the state of Missouri.

=== Mississippi State ===
#24 Mississippi State Bulldogs at #13 Auburn Tigers – Game summary

Quarter	1	2	3	4	Total
#24 Mississippi State	3	7	0	0	10
#13 Auburn	14	7	7	21	49

at Jordan–Hare Stadium • Auburn, Alabama

- Date: September 30, 2017
- Game time: 5:01 p.m.
- Game weather: Temperature: 81° • Wind: 7 mph E • Weather: Partly sunny
- Game attendance: 86,901
- Referee: James Carter
- TV announcers (ESPN): Dave Flemming (play-by-play), Brian Griese (analyst), Todd McShay (sideline reporter)

Game information

First Quarter

- AUB – Kerryon Johnson 1 yd run (Daniel Carlson kick), 12:00 (AUB 7–0)
- MSU – Jace Christmann 40 yd field goal, 6:41 (AUB 7–3)
- AUB – Ryan Davis 7 yd pass from Jarrett Stidham (Daniel Carlson kick), 4:55 (AUB 14–3)

Second Quarter

- AUB – Will Hastings 47 yd pass from Jarrett Stidham (Daniel Carlson kick), 13:38 (AUB 21–3)
- MSU – Justin Johnson 5 yd pass from Nick Fitzgerald (Jace Christmann kick), 0:59 (AUB 21–10)

Third Quarter

- AUB – Kerryon Johnson 2 yd run (Daniel Carlson kick), 9:02 (AUB 28–10)

Fourth Quarter

- AUB – Kerryon Johnson 1 yd run (Daniel Carlson kick), 12:03 (AUB 35–10)
- AUB – Javaris Davis 37 yd interception return (Daniel Carlson kick), 10:42 (AUB 42–10)
- AUB – Malik Willis 67 yd run (Daniel Carlson kick), 3:04 (AUB 49–10)

Top Passers

- MSU – Nick Fitzgerald 13–33, 157 yds, 1 TD
- AUB – Jarrett Stidham 13–16, 264 yds, 2 TD

Top Rushers

- MSU – Nick Fitzgerald 13 carries, 56 yds
- AUB – Kerryon Johnson 23 carries, 116 yds, 3 TD

Top Receivers

- MSU – Justin Johnson 3 receptions, 9 yds, 1 TD
- AUB – Ryan Davis 6 receptions, 32 yds, 1 TD

In the fifth game of the season, it was a battle of teams in the top 25 as Auburn came in ranked #13 and Mississippi State was ranked #24. The Tigers dominated from the start, scoring a touchdown on their opening possession. After a Jarrett Stidham fumble, Mississippi State scored a field goal. However, Auburn used the long pass effectively, using it to set up their next touchdown and scoring their 3rd touchdown on a long pass. At halftime, it was Auburn 21, Mississippi State 10. Auburn then shut out Mississippi State out in the 2nd half and scored 4 more times, giving them a 49–10 victory. In this game, Mississippi State had 7 false start penalties, which coach Gus Malzahn credited to the nearly 87 thousand fans in attendance. Also in this game, Daniel Carlson set the SEC record for most consecutive extra points made with 162 in a row.

=== Ole Miss ===
Ole Miss Rebels at #12 Auburn Tigers – Game summary

Quarter	1	2	3	4	Total
Ole Miss	3	0	7	13	23
#12 Auburn	14	21	6	3	44

at Jordan–Hare Stadium • Auburn, Alabama

- Date: October 7, 2017
- Game time: 11:01 a.m.
- Game weather: Temperature: 84° • Wind: 8 mph SE • Weather: Cloudy
- Game attendance: 86,700
- Referee: Hubert Owens
- TV announcers (SEC Network): Tom Hart (play-by-play), Jordan Rodgers (analyst), Cole Cubelic (sideline reporter)

Game information

First Quarter

- AUB – Kerryon Johnson 17 yd run (Daniel Carlson kick), 7:31 (AUB 7–0)
- MISS – Gary Wunderlich 27 yd field goal, 4:19 (AUB 7–3)
- AUB – Ryan Davis 75 yd pass from Jarrett Stidham (Daniel Carlson kick), 4:04 (AUB 14–3)

Second Quarter

- AUB – Darius Slayton 19 yd pass from Jarrett Stidham (Daniel Carlson kick), 14:53 (AUB 21–3)
- AUB – Kerryon Johnson 48 yd run (Daniel Carlson kick), 12:24 (AUB 28–3)
- AUB – Kerryon Johnson 5 yd run (Daniel Carlson kick), 6:38 (AUB 35–3)

Third Quarter

- AUB – Daniel Carlson 49 yd field goal, 13:53 (AUB 38–3)
- MISS – DK Metcalf 9 yd pass from Shea Patterson, 11:07 (AUB 38–10)
- AUB – Daniel Carlson 25 yd field goal, 3:05 (AUB 41–10)

Fourth Quarter

- MISS – DK Metcalf 8 yd pass from Shea Patterson, 12:27 (AUB 41–17)
- AUB – Daniel Carlson 35 yd field goal, 6:32 (AUB 44–17)
- MISS – Jordan Wilkins 1 yd run (2 pt conversion failed), 2:57 (AUB 44–23)

Top Passers

- MISS – Shea Patterson - 34–51, 346 yds, 2 TD
- AUB – Jarrett Stidham - 14–21, 235 yds, 2 TD

Top Rushers

- MISS – Jordan Wilkins - 13 carries, 65 yds, 1 TD
- AUB – Kerryon Johnson - 28 carries, 204 yds, 3 TD

Top Receivers

- MISS – A. J. Brown - 10 receptions, 109 yds
- AUB – Eli Stove - 3 receptions, 17 yds

The sixth game of the season was a home game against Ole Miss. Ole Miss received the opening kickoff. The Rebels drove down the field but the Auburn defense forced them to a field goal attempt which hit the upright and fell no good. The Tigers then drove down the field and scored on their first drive. The Tigers then allowed a field goal, but scored 4 more touchdowns for the 35–3 halftime lead. In the second half, the Tigers played more sloppily, but won going away 44–23. This was the first game of the season that Auburn allowed more than 14 points. Also, Auburn kicker Daniel Carlson became the SEC's all-time leading scorer after scoring his 413th point, breaking the record of 412 held by Georgia's Blair Walsh.

=== LSU ===
#10 Auburn Tigers at LSU Tigers – Game summary

Quarter	1	2	3	4	Total
#10 Auburn	17	6	0	0	23
LSU	0	14	0	13	27

at Tiger Stadium • Baton Rouge, Louisiana

- Date: October 14, 2017
- Game time: 2:39 p.m.
- Game weather: Temperature: 90° • Wind: ESE 9 mph • Weather: Partly Cloudy
- Game attendance: 101,601
- Referee: John McDaid
- TV announcers (CBS): Brad Nessler (play-by-play), Gary Danielson (analyst), Allie LaForce (sideline reporter)

Game information

First Quarter

- AUB – Daniel Carlson 46 yd field goal, 13:07 (AUB 3–0)
- AUB – Will Hastings 49 yd pass from Jarrett Stidham (Daniel Carlson kick), 11:31 (AUB 10–0)
- AUB – Kerryon Johnson 4 yd run (Daniel Carlson kick), 3:30 (AUB 17–0)

Second Quarter

- AUB – Daniel Carlson 48 yd field goal, 12:50 (AUB 20–0)
- LSU – Stephen Sullivan 1 yd run (Connor Culp kick), 9:19 (AUB 20–7)
- AUB – Daniel Carlson 26 yd field goal, 2:16 (AUB 23–7)
- LSU – Russell Gage 14 yd pass from Danny Etling (Connor Culp kick), 0:32 (AUB 23–14)

Third Quarter
Fourth Quarter

- LSU – D. J. Chark 75 yd punt return (Connor Culp kick), 14:33 (AUB 23–21)
- LSU – Connor Culp 42 yd field goal, 2:36 (LSU 24–23)
- LSU – Connor Culp 36 yd field goal, 0:38 (LSU 27–23)

Top Passers

- AUB – Jarrett Stidham - 9–26, 165 yds, 1 TD
- LSU – Danny Etling - 13–24, 206 yds, 1 TD

Top Rushers

- AUB – Kerryon Johnson - 31 carries, 156 yds, 1 TD
- LSU – Derrius Guice - 20 carries, 71 yds

Top Receivers

- AUB – Will Hastings - 3 receptions, 65 yds, 1 TD
- LSU – D. J. Chark - 5 receptions, 150 yds

After building a 20–0 lead, Auburn was stunned by LSU as they allowed the Fighting Tigers to go on a 27–3 scoring run and fell 27–23. The Auburn Tigers came into the game ranked in the top 10, but the unranked LSU Tigers prevailed. Jarrett Stidham had one of the worst games of his career after a hot start. He had completed 7 of 8 passes to begin the game, he only completed 2 more the remainder of the game, although his receivers had many drops during the game. The key plays for the LSU comeback were a dropped interception by Auburn's Daniel Thomas, which lead to an LSU touchdown later in the drive, and a punt return for a touchdown early in the fourth quarter to cut Auburn's lead to 23–21. The Auburn Tigers only had 73 yards of offense the entire second half, which was a big part of the loss.

=== Arkansas ===
#21 Auburn Tigers at Arkansas Razorbacks – Game summary

Quarter	1	2	3	4	Total
#21 Auburn	10	7	28	7	52
Arkansas	3	3	7	7	20

at Donald W. Reynolds Razorback Stadium • Fayetteville, Arkansas

- Date: October 21, 2017
- Game time: 6:39 p.m.
- Game weather: Temperature: 74° • Wind: SE 10 mph • Weather: Partly Cloudy
- Game attendance: 71,961
- Referee: David Smith
- TV announcers (SEC Network): Tom Hart (play-by-play), Jordan Rodgers (analyst), Cole Cubelic (sideline reporter)

Game information

First Quarter

- AUB – Jarrett Stidham 15 yd run (Daniel Carlson kick), 11:39 (AUB 7–0)
- ARK – Connor Limpert 34 yd field goal, 7:57 (AUB 7–3)
- AUB – Daniel Carlson 21 yd field goal, 1:04 (AUB 10–3)

Second Quarter

- AUB – Kerryon Johnson 2 yd run (Daniel Carlson kick), 3:07 (AUB 17–3)
- ARK – Connor Limpert 38 yd field goal, 0:40 (AUB 17–6)

Third Quarter

- AUB – Kamryn Pettway 2 yd run (Daniel Carlson kick), 12:10 (AUB 24–6)
- AUB – Kamryn Pettway 38 yd run (Daniel Carlson kick), 7:33 (AUB 31–6)
- AUB – Darius Slayton 62 yd pass from Ryan Davis (Daniel Carlson kick), 4:13 (AUB 38–6)
- ARK – De'Vion Warren 100 kickoff return (Connor Limpert kick), 3:57 (AUB 38–13)
- AUB – Kamryn Pettway 11 yd run (Daniel Carlson kick), 0:28 (AUB 45–13)

Fourth Quarter

- AUB – Devan Barrett 4 yd pass from Malik Willis (Daniel Carlson kick), 9:44 (AUB 52–13)
- ARK – Devwah Wailey 2 yd run (Connor Limpert kick), 3:07 (AUB 52–20)

Top Passers

- AUB – Jarrett Stidham 19–28, 218 yds, 1 INT
- ARK – Cole Kelley 15–26, 163 yds

Top Rushers

- AUB – Kamryn Pettway 11 carries, 90 yds, 3 TD
- ARK – David Williams 14 carries, 86 yds

Top Receivers

- AUB – Ryan Davis 8 receptions, 63 yds
- ARK – Jonathan Nance 3 receptions, 25 yds

In the eighth game of the season, Auburn became bowl eligible with their sixth win of the year, a dominating 52–20 victory over Arkansas. The Tigers started fast on offense scoring on their first two drives. The defense started slow, but improved as the game went on, only allowing 13 points, only 6 of which were allowed by the first team (Arkansas scored on a kickoff return for an additional touchdown that was not allowed by the defense). It was only the second time Auburn had won at Arkansas since 2009. The key play came late in the first half when Arkansas fumbled a punt which was recovered by Auburn. The Tigers scored on the ensuing drive to make their lead 17–3 and shift the momentum of the game. This was the second game of a three-game road stretch for the Tigers, as they preceded this game with a loss at LSU, and a game at Texas A&M after a bye week followed this game. This was the Tigers' fourth SEC victory of the season, as well as the fourth SEC game they won by at least 20 points and the fourth time they scored 40 or more points in an SEC contest.

=== Texas A&M ===
#16 Auburn Tigers at Texas A&M Aggies – Game summary

Quarter	1	2	3	4	Total
#16 Auburn	0	21	14	7	42
Texas A&M	3	10	7	7	27

at Kyle Field • College Station, Texas

- Date: November 4, 2017
- Game time: 11:03 a.m.
- Game weather: Temperature: 76° • Wind: 9 mph S • Weather: Cloudy
- Game attendance: 100,257
- Referee: James Carter
- TV announcers (ESPN): Beth Mowins (play-by-play), Anthony Becht (analyst), Rocky Boiman (sideline reporter)

Game information

First Quarter

- TA&M – Daniel LaCamera 39 yd field goal, 12:02 (TA&M 3–0)

Second Quarter

- AUB – Kerryon Johnson 2 yd pass from Jarrett Stidham (Daniel Carlson kick), 10:50 (AUB 7–3)
- TA&M – Keith Ford 2 yd run (Daniel LaCamera kick), 4:01 (TA&M 10–7)
- TA&M – Daniel LaCamera 25 yd field goal, 2:39 (TA&M 13–7)
- AUB – Darius Slayton 53 yd pass from Jarrett Stidham (Daniel Carlson kick), 1:36 (AUB 14–13)
- AUB – Malik Miller 0 yd blocked punt return (Daniel Carlson kick), 0:20 (AUB 21–13)

Third Quarter

- AUB – Ryan Davis 4 yd pass from Jarrett Stidham (Daniel Carlson kick), 10:45 (AUB 28–13)
- AUB – Kerryon Johnson 2 yd run (Daniel Carlson kick), 8:48 (AUB 35–13)
- TA&M – Damion Ratley 62 yd pass from Nick Starkel (Daniel LaCamera kick), 6:09 (AUB 35–20)

Fourth Quarter

- AUB – Eli Stove 4 yd run (Daniel Carlson kick), 5:08 (AUB 42–20)
- TA&M – Damion Ratley 8 yd pass from Nick Starkel (Daniel LaCamera kick), 3:11 (AUB 42–27)

Top Passers

- AUB – Jarrett Stidham - 20–27, 268 yds, 3 TD
- TA&M – Nick Starkel - 11–22, 184 yds, 2 TD

Top Rushers

- AUB – Kerryon Johnson - 29 carries, 145 yds, 1 TD
- TA&M – Trayveon Williams - 15 carries, 103 yds

Top Receivers

- AUB – Ryan Davis - 7 receptions, 80 yds, 1 TD
- TA&M – Christian Kirk - 8 receptions, 62 yds

After a bye week, Auburn concluded a 3-game road stretch with their final road game of the year, a trip to Texas A&M. The Tigers claimed a 42–27 victory over the Aggies. Kicker Daniel Carlson had unusual struggles, having two kicks blocked, both long attempts (49 and 52 yard attempts). Also, the Tigers blocked a Texas A&M punt and recovered it in the end zone for a touchdown, the first blocked punt for Auburn since 2013, and first blocked punt recovered for a touchdown since 2006. Jarrett Stidham had a great day passing completing 20 of 27 attempts for 268 yards. After Kamryn Pettway was ruled out with a broken bone, Kerryon Johnson had to carry the ball more than usual and gained 145 yards.

=== Georgia ===
#2 Georgia Bulldogs at #10 Auburn Tigers – Game summary

Quarter	1	2	3	4	Total
#2 Georgia	7	0	3	7	17
#10 Auburn	6	10	14	10	40

at Jordan–Hare Stadium • Auburn, Alabama

- Date: November 11, 2017
- Game time: 2:46 p.m.
- Game weather: Temperature: 55° • Wind: 8 mph E • Weather: Cloudy
- Game attendance: 87,451
- Referee: Matt Austin
- TV announcers (CBS): Brad Nessler (play-by-play), Gary Danielson (analyst), Allie LaForce (sideline reporter)

Game information

First Quarter

- UGA – Nick Chubb 1 yd run (Rodrigo Blankenship kick), 11:21 (UGA 7–0)
- AUB – Daniel Carlson 54 yd field goal, 8:19 (UGA 7–3)
- AUB – Daniel Carlson 37 yd field goal, 1:20 (UGA 7–6)

Second Quarter

- AUB – Daniel Carlson 30 yd field goal, 12:03 (AUB 9–7)
- AUB – Darius Slayton 42 yd pass from Jarrett Stidham (Daniel Carlson kick), 4:09 (AUB 16–7)

Third Quarter

- AUB – Jarrett Stidham 7 yd run (Daniel Carlson kick), 11:57 (AUB 23–7)
- AUB – Ryan Davis 32 yd pass from Jarrett Stidham (Daniel Carlson kick), 8:12 (AUB 30–7)
- UGA – Rodrigo Blankenship 47 yd field goal, 5:23 (AUB 30–10)

Fourth Quarter

- AUB – Daniel Carlson 37 yd field goal, 10:06 (AUB 33–10)
- AUB – Kerryon Johnson 55 yd pass from Jarrett Stidham (Daniel Carlson kick), 6:13 (AUB 40–10)
- UGA – Riley Ridley 14 yd pass from Jake Fromm (Rodrigo Blankenship kick), 2:19 (AUB 40–17)

Top Passers

- UGA – Jake Fromm - 13–28, 184 yds, 1 TD
- AUB – Jarrett Stidham - 16–23, 214 yds, 3 TD

Top Rushers

- UGA – Nick Chubb - 11 carries, 27 yds, 1 TD
- AUB – Kerryon Johnson - 32 carries, 167 yds

Top Receivers

- UGA – Terry Godwin - 4 receptions, 54 yds
- AUB – Ryan Davis - 4 receptions, 55 yds, 1 TD

In the Deep South's Oldest Rivalry, Auburn defeated previously undefeated Georgia handily, winning by a final score of 40–17. The Tigers held the dominant run attack of Georgia to 46 total yards and had 4 sacks of Georgia quarterback Jake Fromm. Kerryon Johnson had 167 rushing yards against a powerful Georgia rush defense, which put him over 1,000 yards for the year. Jarrett Stidham was also impressive, completing 16 of his 23 pass attempts for 214 yards. Daniel Carlson, after going 0 for 2 on field goals last week, had 4 good field goal attempts becoming the SEC's all-time leader in made field goals. This was Auburn's eighth win of the year, and their first victory over Georgia since 2013.

=== Louisiana–Monroe ===
Louisiana–Monroe Warhawks at #6 Auburn Tigers – Game summary

Quarter	1	2	3	4	Total
Louisiana–Monroe	7	0	0	7	14
#6 Auburn	7	7	14	14	42

at Jordan–Hare Stadium • Auburn, Alabama

- Date: November 18, 2017
- Game time: 11:01 a.m.
- Game weather: Temperature: 65° • Wind: 13 mph S • Weather: Cloudy
- Game attendance: 82,133
- Referee: Ken Williamson
- TV announcers (ESPN2): Jason Benetti (play-by-play), Kelly Stouffer (analyst), Kris Budden (sideline reporter)

Game information

First Quarter

- AUB – Kerryon Johnson 8 yd run (Daniel Carlson kick), 12:08 (AUB 7–0)
- ULM – Brian Williams 2 yd run (Craig Ford kick), 6:36 (TIE 7–7)

Second Quarter

- AUB – Darius Slayton 50 yd pass from Jarrett Stidham (Daniel Carlson kick), 1:27 (AUB 14–7)

Third Quarter

- AUB – Kam Martin 1 yd run (Daniel Carlson kick), 9:33 (AUB 21–7)
- AUB – Kam Martin 41 yd pass from Jarrett Stidham (Daniel Carlson kick), 2:46 (AUB 28–7)

Fourth Quarter

- AUB – Nick Ruffin 45 yd interception return (Daniel Carlson kick), 7:09 (AUB 35–7)
- ULM – Brian Williams 70 yd pass from Garrett Smith (Craig Ford kick), 5:41 (AUB 35–14)
- AUB – Malik Miller 1 yd run (Daniel Carlson kick), 2:58 (AUB 42–14)

Top Passers

- ULM – Caleb Evans - 9–25, 86 yds
- AUB – Jarrett Stidham - 18–24, 235 yds, 2 TD, 1 INT

Top Rushers

- ULM – Derrick Gore - 14 carries, 46 yds
- AUB – Kerryon Johnson - 22 carries, 137 yds, 1 TD

Top Receivers

- ULM – Marcus Green - 5 receptions, 31 yds
- AUB – Ryan Davis - 6 receptions, 48 yds

The eleventh game of the year was a tune-up game for the following week's Iron Bowl. However, the Tigers struggled early, being tied with ULM for most of the first half and only leading 14–7 at halftime. The Tigers stepped it up in the second half, outscoring the Warhawks in that period 28–7. The Tigers also struggled with injuries with many key players, such as Jeff Holland, Austin Golson, and Tre Williams going down during the game, though some injured players returned. This was Auburn 9th win of the year, their most since 2013 (the Tigers had 8 wins twice since then and 7 wins once). This also assured the following week's Iron Bowl would match up two top ten teams with the SEC Western Division championship on the line.

=== Alabama ===
#1 Alabama Crimson Tide at #6 Auburn Tigers – Game summary

Quarter	1	2	3	4	Total
#1 Alabama	0	7	7	0	14
#6 Auburn	7	3	10	6	26

at Jordan–Hare Stadium • Auburn, Alabama

- Date: November 25, 2017
- Game time: 2:41 p.m.
- Game weather: Temperature: 63° • Wind: 6 mph W • Weather: Mostly Cloudy
- Game attendance: 87,451
- Referee: Matt Loeffler
- TV announcers (CBS): Brad Nessler (play-by-play), Gary Danielson (analyst), Allie LaForce (sideline reporter)

Game information

First Quarter

- AUB – Nate Craig-Myers 3 yd pass from Kerryon Johnson (Daniel Carlson kick), 4:38 (AUB 7–0)

Second Quarter

- ALA – Jerry Jeudy 36 yd pass from Jalen Hurts (Andy Pappanastos kick), 8:31 (TIE 7–7)
- AUB – Daniel Carlson 33 yd field goal, 0:00 (AUB 10–7)

Third Quarter

- ALA – Bo Scarbrough 21 yd run (Andy Pappanastos kick), 13:22 (ALA 14–10)
- AUB – Daniel Carlson 44 yd field goal, 10:12 (ALA 14–13)
- AUB – Kerryon Johnson 1 yd run (Daniel Carlson kick), 3:02 (AUB 20–14)

Fourth Quarter

- AUB – Jarrett Stidham 16 yd run (2 pt conversion failed), 12:49 (AUB 26–14)

Top Passers

- ALA – Jalen Hurts - 12–22, 112 yds, 1 TD
- AUB – Jarrett Stidham - 21–28, 237 yds

Top Rushers

- ALA – Jalen Hurts - 18 carries, 82 yds
- AUB – Kerryon Johnson - 30 carries, 104 yds, 1 TD

Top Receivers

- ALA – Calvin Ridley - 3 receptions, 38 yds
- AUB – Ryan Davis - 11 receptions, 139 yds

The final game of the regular season was the annual Iron Bowl game against Alabama, with a trip to the SEC Championship on the line. The Tigers struck first as Kerryon Johnson took a direct snap and completed a jump pass to Nate Craig-Myers. The Crimson Tide responded with a long touchdown pass of their own. The Tigers went ahead at the end of the first half with a field goal from Daniel Carlson to go into halftime with a 10–7 lead. Alabama had a long, quick drive to begin the second half and scored to go ahead 14–10. Auburn responded with another field goal to cut it to 14–13. Auburn then scored twice more and stopped Alabama on fourth down three times to win 26–14. Kerryon Johnson suffered a shoulder injury in the fourth quarter, and his backup, Kam Martin, twisted an ankle while playing for him. Ryan Davis also set the Auburn record for receptions in a single season in this game. The Tigers won the SEC West, and advanced to the SEC Championship Game against SEC East winner Georgia, whom Auburn defeated 40–17 earlier this season.

=== Georgia ===
2017 SEC Championship Game
#6 Georgia Bulldogs vs. #2 Auburn Tigers – Game summary

Quarter	1	2	3	4	Total
#6 Georgia	0	10	3	15	28
#2 Auburn	7	0	0	0	7

at Mercedes–Benz Stadium • Atlanta, Georgia

- Date: December 2, 2017
- Game time: 3:12 p.m.
- Game weather: Indoors
- Game attendance: 76,534
- Referee: John McDaid
- TV announcers (CBS): Brad Nessler (play-by-play), Gary Danielson (analyst), Allie LaForce (sideline reporter)

Game information

First quarter

- AU – Nate Craig-Myers 6 yd pass from Jarrett Stidham (Daniel Carlson kick), 9:54. AU 7–0.

Second quarter

- UGA – Isaac Nauta 2 yd pass from Jake Fromm (Rodrigo Blankenship kick), 10:14. Tied 7–7.
- UGA – Rodrigo Blankenship 27 yd field goal, 4:59. UGA 10–7.

Third quarter

- UGA – Rodrigo Blankenship 35 yd field goal, 1:26. UGA 13–7.

Fourth quarter

- UGA – Terry Godwin 7 yd pass from Jake Fromm (2pt conversion: Terry Godwin pass from Jake Fromm), 13:06. UGA 21–7.
- UGA – D'Andre Swift 64 yd run (R. Blankenship kick), 10:34. UGA 28–7.

Top Passers

- UGA – Jake Fromm – 16/22, 183 yards, 2 TD
- AUB – Jarrett Stidham – 16/32, 145 yards, TD

Top Rushers

- UGA – D'Andre Swift – 7 carries, 88 yards, TD
- AUB – Kerryon Johnson – 13 carries, 44 yards

Top Receivers

- UGA – Mecole Hardman – 4 receptions, 67 yards
- AUB – Ryan Davis – 7 carries, 65 yards

The Tigers clinched a berth in the SEC Championship Game with their victory over Alabama. The Tigers played Georgia for the second time this season, after defeating the Bulldogs 40–17 on November 11. It was Auburn's sixth appearance in the SEC Championship, going 3–2 with losses to Tennessee in 1997 and Florida in 2000, and victories over Tennessee in 2004, South Carolina in 2010, and Missouri in 2013. It was also the first SEC Championship Game held in the new Mercedes-Benz Stadium after the Georgia Dome was demolished the week before. Despite beating #1 Georgia three weeks prior to the SEC championship, Georgia defeated Auburn 28–7, earning them a spot in the CFP Semifinal Rose Bowl at the #3 spot, where they will play #2 Oklahoma. Although they beat Alabama in the Iron Bowl, costing Alabama an undefeated season and a trip to the SEC Championship, Alabama was still selected to play #1 Clemson in the CFP Semifinal in the Sugar Bowl.

=== UCF ===
2018 Peach Bowl
#10 UCF Knights vs. #7 Auburn Tigers – Game summary

Quarter	1	2	3	4	Total
#10 UCF	0	13	7	14	34
#7 Auburn	3	3	14	7	27

at Mercedes–Benz Stadium • Atlanta, Georgia

- Date: January 1, 2018
- Game time: 11:30 a.m.
- Game weather: Indoors
- Game attendance: 71,109
- Referee: Brandon Cruse
- TV announcers (ESPN): Dave Flemming (play-by-play), Brock Huard (analyst), Allison Williams (sideline reporter)

Game information

First Quarter

- (7:01) AUB – Daniel Carlson 25-yard field goal (Drive: 9 plays, 43 yards, 3:51; Auburn 3–0)

Second Quarter

- (11:11) UCF – Matthew Wright 33-yard field goal (Drive: 12 plays, 48 yards, 3:04; Tied 3–3)
- (8:51) UCF – McKenzie Milton 18-yard run, Matthew Wright kick (Drive: 2 plays, 21 yards, 0:47; UCF 10–3)
- (0:45) AUB – Daniel Carlson 45-yard field goal (Drive: 15 plays, 62 yards, 4:16; UCF 10–6)
- (0:00) UCF – Matthew Wright 45-yard field goal (Drive: 15 plays, 42 yards, 0:45; UCF 13–6)

Third Quarter

- (14:05) AUB – Will Hastings 26-yard pass from Jarrett Stidham, Daniel Carlson kick (Drive: 2 plays, 26 yards, 0:43; Tied 13–13)
- (7:55) AUB – Kerryon Johnson 4-yard run, Daniel Carlson kick (Drive: 10 plays, 82 yards, 3:37; Auburn 20–13)
- (1:30) UCF – Otis Anderson 12-yard pass from McKenzie Milton, Matthew Wright kick (Drive: 7 plays, 65 yards, 2:44; Tied 20–20)

Fourth Quarter

- (11:36) UCF – Dredrick Snelson 8-yard pass from McKenzie Milton, Matthew Wright kick (Drive: 8 plays, 59 yards, 3:17; UCF 27–20)
- (5:56) UCF – Chequan Burkett 45-yard interception return, Matthew Wright kick (UCF 34–20)
- (4:12) AUB – Eli Stove 7-yard run, Daniel Carlson kick (Drive: 6 plays, 89 yards, 1:37; UCF 34–27)

Top Passers

- UCF – McKenzie Milton – 16/35, 242 yards, 2 TD
- AUB – Jarrett Stidham – 28/43, 331 yards, TD, 2 INT

Top Rushers

- UCF – McKenzie Milton – 13 carries, 116 yards, TD
- AUB – Kerryon Johnson – 23 carries, 71 yards, TD

Top Receivers

- UCF – Tre'Quan Smith – 5 receptions, 89 yards
- AUB – Ryan Davis – 8 receptions, 47 yards

For their 10 win season, Auburn was chosen by the College Football Playoff committee to play in the Chick-fil-A Peach Bowl. It is Auburn's second appearance in a CFP New Year's Six bowl, after the 2017 Sugar Bowl to follow the 2016 season. It is also Auburn's fourth meeting with UCF, with the Tigers winning the previous three from 1997 to 1999. Auburn will be making their sixth appearance in the Peach Bowl, and their first since 2011, when they defeated Virginia. Overall, the Tigers are 4–1 in the Peach Bowl, with victories over Indiana in 1990, Clemson in 1997, Clemson in 2007, and Virginia in 2011. Their only loss came against North Carolina in 2001. It is the 50th anniversary of the Peach Bowl. Coincidentally, Auburn also played in the 50th anniversary games of the Sugar Bowl and Cotton Bowl Classic as well.

== Rankings ==
Ranking movements Legend: ██ Increase in ranking ██ Decrease in ranking ( ) = First-place votes
	Week															
Poll	Pre	1	2	3	4	5	6	7	8	9	10	11	12	13	14	Final
AP	12	13	15	15	13	12	10	21	19	16	10	6	6	4	7	10
Coaches	13	13	17	16	15	13	11	21	19	15	10	6	6	4 (4)	8	12
CFP	Not released									14	10	6	6	2	7	Not released

== Players in the 2018 NFL draft ==
Auburn had four players selected in the 2018 NFL draft.

Player	Position	Round	Pick	NFL club
Braden Smith	G	2	37	Indianapolis Colts
Kerryon Johnson	RB	2	43	Detroit Lions
Carlton Davis	CB	2	63	Tampa Bay Buccaneers
Daniel Carlson	K	5	167	Minnesota Vikings
