= McKenzie Milton =

American football player and coach (born 1997)

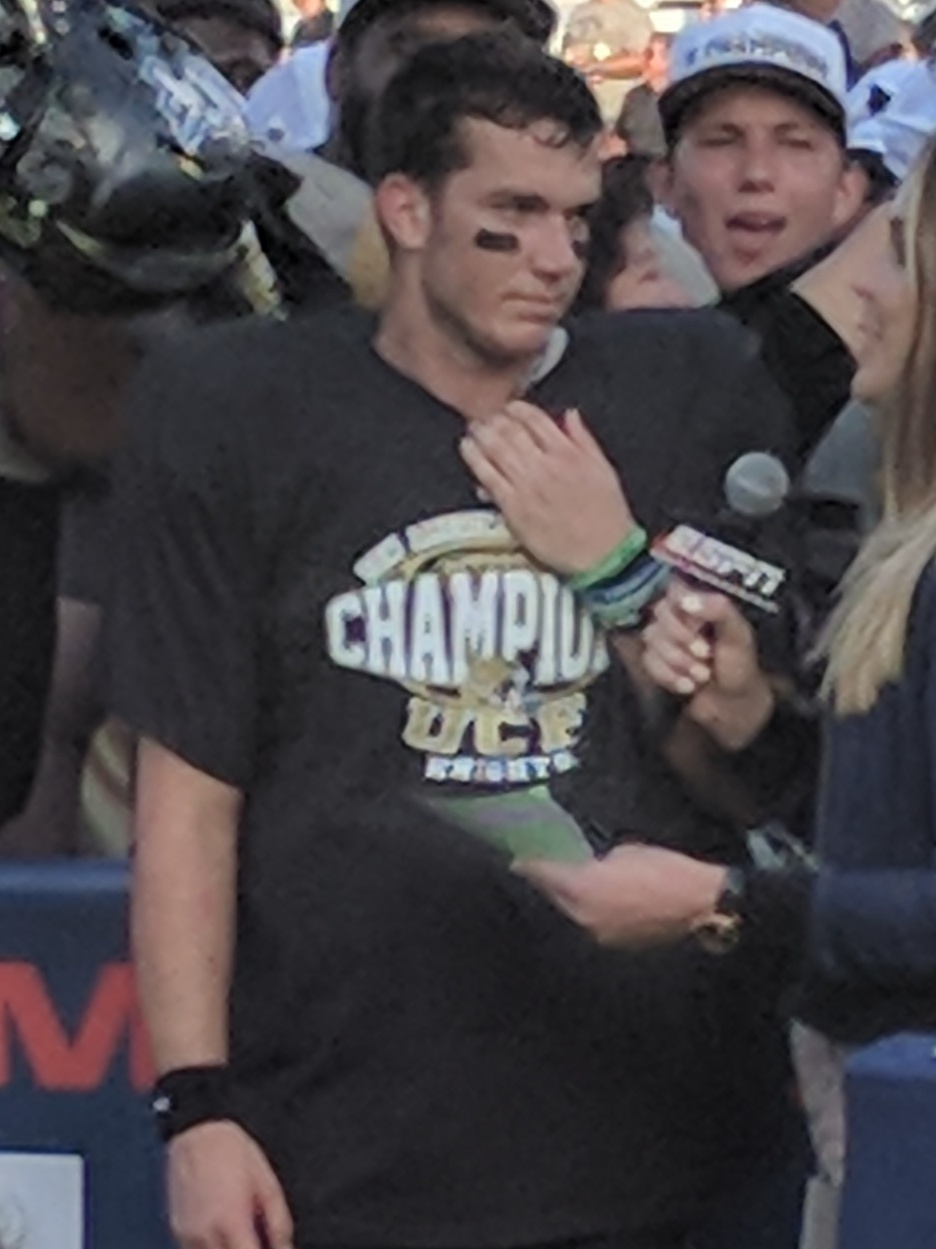
- Milton being interviewed at the trophy presentation for the 2017 American Athletic Conference Championship

Current position
- Title: Quarterbacks coach
- Team: University of Central Florida
- Conference: Big 12

Biographical details
- Born: October 10, 1997 (age 29); Kapolei, Hawaii, U.S.

Playing career
- 2016–2020: UCF
- 2021: Florida State
- Position: Quarterback

Coaching career (HC unless noted)
- 2023–2024: Tennessee (OA)
- 2025–present: UCF (QB)

Accomplishments and honors

Awards
- As a player: American Athletic Conference Football Championship Game MVP (2017); Colley Matrix national champion (2017); 2× First-team All-AAC (2017, 2018); 2× AAC Offensive Player of the Year (2017, 2018); Archie Griffin Award (2017); Brian Piccolo Award (2021); Mayo Clinic Comeback Player of the Year (2021)

McKenzie Milton (born October 10, 1997) is an American college football coach and former player who is the quarterbacks coach for the University of Central Florida (UCF) Knights football team. He was an offensive analyst for the Tennessee Volunteers from 2023 to 2024. Milton began his playing career as a quarterback for UCF and the Florida State Seminoles. Following a severe knee injury during the 2018 season at UCF, Milton transferred to Florida State in 2021 and finished his playing career with the Seminoles, before joining former UCF coach Josh Heupel at Tennessee as an offensive analyst.

== Early life and family ==
Milton was born on October 10, 1997 to Mark and Teresa Milton in Kapolei, Hawaii. He attended Mililani High School in Mililani, Hawaii, where he was a three-star dual-threat quarterback. During his career at Mililani High School, he had 7,303 passing yards and 81 passing touchdowns, as well as rushing for 1,810 yards with 18 touchdowns.

== College career ==
=== University of Central Florida ===
He chose the University of Central Florida because of new head coach Scott Frost, the former offensive coordinator of Heisman winning quarterback Marcus Mariota, whom Milton had idolized in high school. Milton started 10 games his freshman year leading the Knights to a 6–6 regular season record and an appearance in the Cure Bowl. The previous year, the Knights had gone 0–12. In his Sophomore year, Milton led the Knights to a 12–0 regular season record, winning the AAC and eventually the Peach Bowl against the SEC runner-up Auburn Tigers. Milton was named the AAC offensive player of the year. Milton was named one of the finalists for the 2017 Heisman Trophy and placed 8th in voting. Milton was named the offensive MVP in the 2018 Peach Bowl, Milton threw for two touchdowns and went 13/18 in the second half. He ended the game 16 of 35 with 242 yards, 2 touchdowns and no interceptions. Milton also excelled with his legs, picking up 116 yards on the ground and scoring a touchdown, which led all UCF rushers. This was UCF's first ever Peach Bowl win, and second New Year's Six win in four years. Following the game, the Knights were ranked #1 in an NCAA recognized poll and the school was therefore entitled to claim a national championship. (Note: UCF claims a national championship for the 2017 season, and the team was ranked number 1 by the Colley Matrix, an NCAA-recognized selector of national champions.)

=== Injury and aftermath ===
On November 23, 2018, UCF played the last game of the regular season against in-state rival University of South Florida. Early in the second quarter, Milton pulled the ball on a belly option and ran right. He was tackled by two USF players. This caused Milton to dislocate his knee. He was carted off the field and then rushed to nearby Tampa General Hospital. Upon arrival, doctors found extensive damage to the arteries and nerves in his right knee. Emergency surgery was undertaken to restore arterial blood flow; this involved taking the saphenous vein out of his left leg and transferring the vessel to the right leg to restore blood flow to that limb. The surgery was successful. Two more surgeries followed over the course of several days. Milton was discharged from the hospital on November 30. Milton underwent reconstructive knee surgery in January 2019.

In an interview he gave for ESPN's Andrea Adelson as the second anniversary of his injury approached, Milton publicly revealed for the first time that he had to undergo two subsequent operations. He was walking again in the late spring of 2019, but in July woke up with what Adelson described as "searing pain" in the rebuilt knee and was unable to walk. He immediately saw a physician who put a needle in that knee, drawing out pus. The doctor told Milton that he needed an immediate surgery to keep him from losing the cadaver tissue that had been used in the initial reconstruction. After that surgery, Milton had a peripherally inserted central catheter installed for daily antibiotics, but an MRI revealed a pocket of pus behind the rebuilt knee, leading to another surgery near the start of the 2019 season. In the 2020 interview, Milton estimated that the infection set his recovery back six months. He was eventually cleared to resume football activity during the summer of 2020, and ran UCF's scout team in that season.

=== Florida State University ===
In a video posted by UCF Football on December 3, 2020, Milton announced that he would seek a transfer for the 2021 college football season. Milton stated in the video that he believed "It's Dillon Gabriel's team now" and would not want to remove Gabriel from the spotlight. On December 13, 2020, Milton announced that he would be transferring to Florida State University to play for coach Mike Norvell.

On September 5, 2021, he returned for his first game since the injury. On his first throw in Florida State's game against Notre Dame, he threw a complete pass. Notre Dame won the game 41–38. Milton completed 5 passes of 7 attempts for 48 yards and led the Seminoles back from a 10-point deficit late in the 4th quarter to tie the game and force overtime.

=== Hula Bowl ===
Milton was invited to the 2022 Hula Bowl All-star game, in which he represented Team AINA as the starting quarterback. This was his first time playing a game back in the Bounce House since 2018. Milton wore a custom gold helmet representing both UCF on one side and Florida State on the other, with a peace fingers sticker on the back representing the recent passing of friend and former UCF teammate Otis Anderson Jr.

=== NIL venture ===
On July 1, 2021, NCAA student-athletes were allowed to receive compensation for use of their name, image, and likeness (NIL) for the first time, and Milton was one of the first athletes to take advantage of the new rules. He and Miami quarterback D'Eriq King became the co-founders and public faces of Dreamfield, a company specializing in booking live appearances for student-athletes. Dreamfield also offers non-fungible tokens (NFTs), digital art works that cannot be duplicated and are purchased with cryptocurrency. Milton was the subject of Dreamland's first NFT auction, set for July 6, 2021.

=== Statistics ===
Year	Team	Games		Passing								Rushing			
Year	Team	GP	Record	Comp	Att	Pct	Yards	Avg	TD	Int	Rate	Att	Yards	Avg	TD
2016	UCF	10	4–6	194	336	57.7	1,983	5.9	10	7	113.0	100	158	1.6	3
2017	UCF	13	13–0	265	395	67.1	4,037	10.2	37	9	179.3	106	613	5.8	8
2018	UCF	10	10–0	171	289	59.2	2,663	9.2	25	6	161.0	79	307	3.9	9
2019	UCF	DNP													
2020	UCF	DNP													
2021	Florida State	6	0–4	81	139	58.3	775	5.6	3	6	103.6	31	-13	-0.4	0
Career		39	27−10	711	1,159	61.3	9,458	8.2	75	28	146.4	316	1,065	3.4	20

== Coaching career ==
On May 23, 2023, Milton was hired by the University of Tennessee as an offensive analyst, reuniting with his former head coach Josh Heupel.

On December 10, 2024, following the announcement that his former coach Scott Frost was returning to UCF as their head coach, Milton was announced as UCF's next quarterback coach, reuniting him both with Frost and UCF.
