= 2018 UCF Knights football team =

American college football season

2018 UCF Knights football

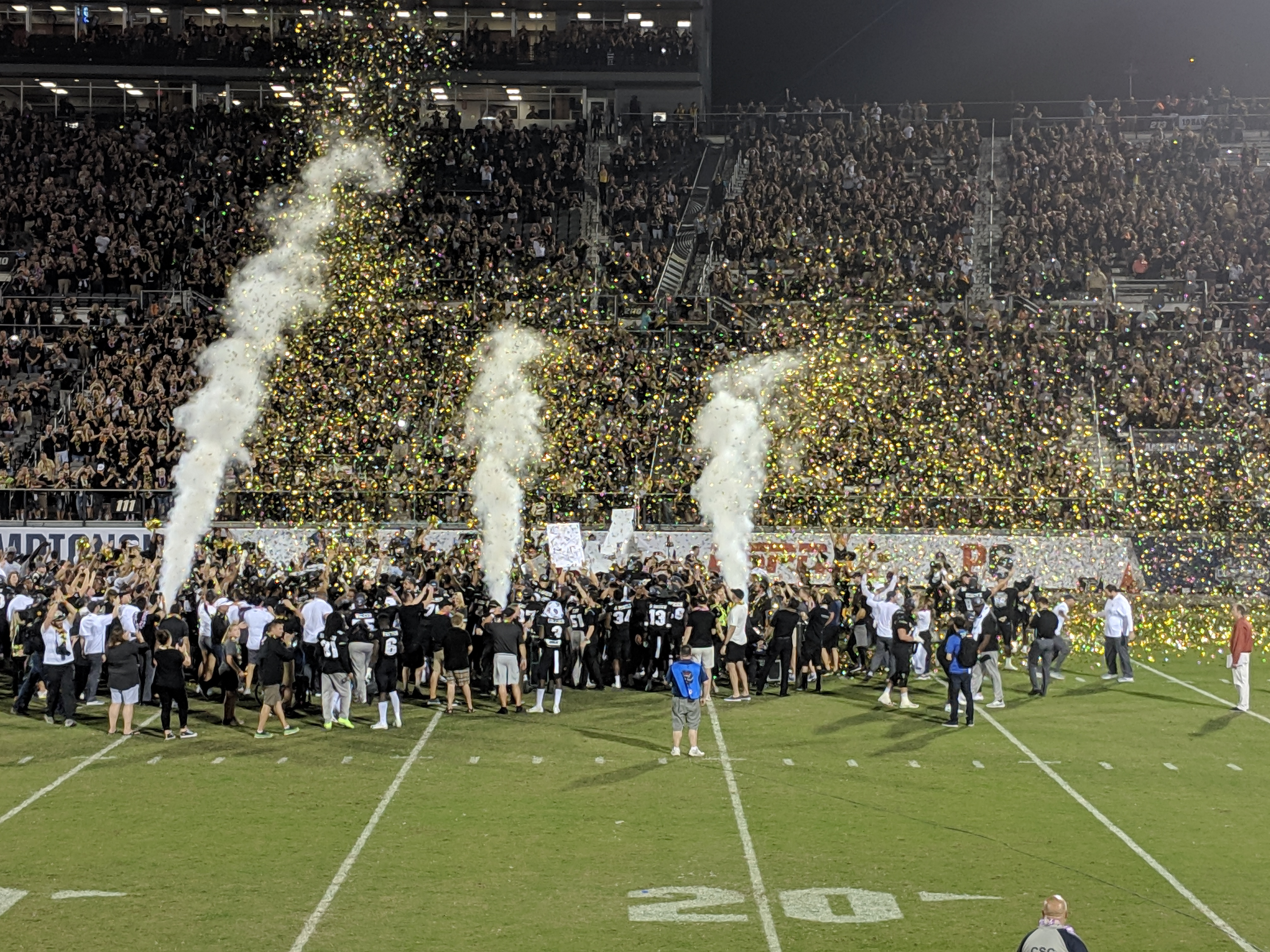
- UCF celebrates their victory over Memphis in the AAC Championship Game.

American Athletic Conference champion AAC East Division champion

American Athletic Championship Game W 56–41 vs. Memphis

Fiesta Bowl, L 32–40 vs. LSU
- Conference: American Athletic Conference
- East Division

Ranking
- Coaches: No. 12
- AP: No. 11
- Record: 12–1 (8–0 AAC)
- Head coach: Josh Heupel (1st season)
- Offensive scheme: Veer and shoot
- Defensive coordinator: Randy Shannon (1st season)
- Base defense: 4–3
- Home stadium: Spectrum Stadium

2018 American Athletic Conference football standings
	Conf.			Overall
Team	W		L	W		L
East Division
No. 11 UCF x$	8	–	0	12	–	1
Temple	7	–	1	8	–	5
No. 24 Cincinnati	6	–	2	11	–	2
South Florida	3	–	5	7	–	6
East Carolina	1	–	7	3	–	9
UConn	0	–	8	1	–	11
West Division
Memphis xy	5	–	3	8	–	6
Houston x	5	–	3	8	–	5
Tulane x	5	–	3	7	–	6
SMU	4	–	4	5	–	7
Navy	2	–	6	3	–	10
Tulsa	2	–	6	3	–	9
Championship: UCF 56, Memphis 41
$ – Conference champion; x – Division champion/co-champions; y – Championship game participant; Rankings from AP Poll

The 2018 UCF Knights football team represented the University of Central Florida (UCF) during the 2018 NCAA Division I FBS football season. They played their home games at Spectrum Stadium in Orlando, Florida, and were led by first-year head coach Josh Heupel. The Knights competed as members of the East Division of the American Athletic Conference. The 2018 season marked the 40th season of football for the Knights program.

The 2018 campaign began with the Knights attempting to defend their AAC championship, as well as extend the nation's longest active winning streak, which stood at 13 games. For the first time in program history, the Knights were ranked in both the preseason AP Poll (#21) and preseason Coaches Poll (#23). By week 12, the team had risen into the top ten of the AP, Coaches, and CFP rankings (#8), the first time they had been ranked in the top ten in all three during the regular season. On November 17, the UCF campus hosted ESPN's College Gameday for the first time in program history.

After winning their first twelve games of the season, UCF extended their school record winning streak to 25 consecutive games, dating back to the start of the 2017 season. The Knights also secured their second-consecutive undefeated regular season, and second-consecutive American Athletic Conference title by defeating Memphis in the 2018 AAC Championship Game. It was the fourth AAC conference title in six years for the Knights. Under Heupel, UCF continued to employ an explosive no-huddle offense. The Knights ranked 5th in the nation in total yards/game (522.7), and 6th in points/game (43.2).

In the last game of the regular season, starting quarterback McKenzie Milton suffered a serious leg injury, and was out for the season. Milton would never play another down for the Knights. Backup quarterback Darriel Mack Jr. took over for the remainder of that game, and subsequently led the team to victory in the AAC championship. They were invited to their third NY6/BCS bowl in school history, the Fiesta Bowl. Mack struggled in the Fiesta Bowl, and without star quarterback Milton under center, their winning streak came to end. They were defeated by LSU, 40–32.

== Preseason ==
=== Award watch lists ===
Listed in the order that they were released

Award	Player	Position	Year
Lott Trophy	Pat Jasinski	LB	SR
Rimington Trophy	Jordan Johnson	C	JR
Chuck Bednarik Award	Trysten Hill	DT	JR
Maxwell Award	McKenzie Milton	QB	JR
Davey O'Brien Award	McKenzie Milton	QB	JR
Jim Thorpe Award	Kyle Gibson	DB	SR
Bronko Nagurski Trophy	Kyle Gibson	DB	SR
Bronko Nagurski Trophy	Trysten Hill	DT	JR
Outland Trophy	Trysten Hill	DT	JR
Outland Trophy	Jordan Johnson	C	JR
Walter Camp Award	McKenzie Milton	QB	JR
Johnny Unitas Golden Arm Award	McKenzie Milton	QB	JR
Manning Award	McKenzie Milton	QB	JR

=== AAC media poll ===
The AAC media poll was released on July 24, 2018, with the Knights predicted to win AAC East Division. They were also predicted to win the overall AAC championship.

Media poll (East)
Predicted finish	Team	Votes (1st place)
1	UCF	175 (25)
2	USF	140 (5)
3	Temple	132
4	Cincinnati	91
5	UConn	51
6	East Carolina	41

=== Spring game ===
The 2018 UCF Spring exhibition game was held Saturday April 21 at Spectrum Stadium. The team was informally split into two squads for gameplay, team Black and team Gold. Team officials assigned points to the two squads at their discretion. Dylan Barnas kicked a 31-yard field goal as time expired for a final score of 17-14.

Date	Time	Spring Game	Site	Result	Attendance
April 21	6:00 pm	Black vs. Gold	Spectrum Stadium • Orlando, FL	17-14	22,973

== Personnel ==
2018 UCF Knights Football
Quarterback: 8 Darriel Mack Jr. – (redshirt) freshman (6'3, 230); 10 McKenzie Milton – junior (5'11, 185); 12 Quadry Jones – freshman (6'0, 176); 14 Hayden Kingston – (redshirt) sophomores (5'11, 194); Running back: 2 Otis Anderson Jr. – sophomore (5'11, 174); 4 Taj McGowan – senior (6', 210); 9 Adrian Killins – sophomore (5'8, 158); 24 Bentavious Thompson – (redshirt) freshman (6'1, 190); 30 Greg McCrae – sophomore (5'10, 175); 33 Jarrion Finley – freshman (5'6, 160); 35 Trilion Coles – freshman (5'8, 180); Wide receiver: 3 Jaquarius Bargnare – sophomore (5'9, 184); 4 Tre'Quan Smith – (redshirt) junior (6'1, 210); 5 Dredrick Snelson – sophomore (6'0, 206); 6 Tristan Payton – junior (6'0, 196); 7 Emmanuel Logan-Greene – freshman (5'10, 171); 11 Cam Stewart – senior (6'3, 203); 13 Gabe Davis – sophomore (6'3, 219); 16 Tre Nixon – (redshirt) sophomore (6'2, 280); 17 Marlon Williams – sophomore (6'0, 222); 21 Dontay Mayfield – (redshirt) sophomore (6'1, 204); 36 Kyle Benkel – (redshirt) sophomore (5'9, 184); 38 Jonathan Moore– freshman (5'9, 180); 45 Jason Colubiale – (redshirt) freshman (6'0, 185); 81 Alex Harris – (redshirt) sophomore (6'0, 192); 82 Kenyon Johnson – (redshirt) freshman (5'10, 175); 83 Elijah Spann – (redshirt) senior (5'6, 165); 84 Ke'von Ahmad– freshman (6'0, 195); 85 Tristan Reaves – (redshirt) senior (6'3, 216); 87 Jacob Harris – (redshirt) sophomore (6'5, 211); Kicker: 39 Dylan Barnas – (redshirt) sophomore (5'8, 175); Placekicker: 11 Matthew Wright – (redshirt) Senior (6'0, 179); 49 Connor Piazza – freshman (5'10, 170); Punter: 37 Andrew Osteen – freshman (6'1, 160); 48 Mac Loudermilk – (redshirt) senior (6'1, 264)	Tight end: 15 Brett Bell – sophomore (6'6, 261); 42 Tyler Williams – (redshirt) sophomore (6'1, 220); 80 Christopher DeLoach – senior (6'5, 257); 86 Michael Colubiale – (redshirt) senior (6'1, 223); 88 Jake Hescock – (redshirt) sophomore (6'7, 252); 89 Anthony Roberson – (redshirt) sophomore (6'5, 237); 90 Jonathan MacCollister – (redshirt) freshman (6'3, 247); 92 Alec Holler – freshman (6'2, 225); Offensive lineman: 53 Tyler Hudanick – senior (6'5, 312); 56 Lamarius Benson – freshman (6'3, 321); 58 Eric Siedelman – freshman (6'3, 293); 61 Parker Boudreaux – (redshirt) sophomore (6'4, 301); 62 Edward Collins – freshman (6'6, 310); 64 Kyle Back – freshman (6'4, 320); 65 Cole Schneider – (redshirt) freshman (6'4, 312); 66 Chidoziri Maghiro – (redshirt) freshman (6'5, 310); 70 Luke Palmer – (redshirt) senior (6'2, 285); 71 James Collins – freshman (6'5, 311); 72 Jordan Johnson – junior (6'2, 320); 73 Samuel Jackson – sophomore (6'6, 356); 74 Bailey Grainer – (redshirt) senior (6'5, 306); 77 Jake Brown – (redshirt) junior (6'3, 305); 78 Wyatt Miller – (redshirt) senior (6'4, 306); 79 Trevor Elbert – (redshirt) junior (6'5, 312); Defensive lineman: 6 Brendon Hayes – (redshirt) junior (6'3, 293); 7 Kenny Turnier – (redshirt) sophomore (6'4, 260); 9 Trysten Hill – junior (6'2, 315); 43 Aaron Cochran – senior (6'3, 287); 46 Davonchae Bryant – freshman (6'7, 275); 54 A.J. Wooten – (redshirt) senior (6'5, 285); 55 Ike Walker – freshman (6'4, 350); 58 Randy Charlton – freshman (6'3, 258); 91 Joey Connors – (redshirt) senior (6'1, 313); 92 Austin Camden – (redshirt) freshman (6'3, 256); 94 Anthony Montalvo – (redshirt) freshman (6'3, 274); 95 Jeremiah Zio – (redshirt) freshman (6'8, 250); 97 Mason Cholewa – (redshirt) freshman (6'7, 280); 98 Tyrese Black – freshman (6'5, 290)	Inside linebacker: 24 Gabriel Luyanda – senior (6'5, 250); 40 Eriq Gilyard – (redshirt) junior (5'11, 228); 51 Darious East – (redshirt) freshman (5'8, 220); 56 Pat Jasinski – senior (6'1, 233); 57 Tye Farmer – (redshirt) freshman (5'11, 245); 69 Steven Moss – (redshirt) sophomore (5'11, 216); Outside linebacker: 10 Titus Davis – senior (6'3, 248); 22 Kalia Davis – (redshirt) freshman (6'2, 266); 28 Shawn Burgess-Becker – (redshirt) sophomore (6'2, 224); 35 Dedrion Bacote-Sweat – (redshirt) sophomore (6'2, 231); 49 Dedrick Canady – (redshirt) sophomore (6'2, 245); 93 Landon Woodson – freshman (6'6, 241); 96 Stephon Zayas – (redshirt) freshman (6'6, 235); Linebacker: 44 Nate Evans – junior (6'1, 242); 33 Monterious Loggins – (redshirt) sophomore (6'0, 237); 45 Lyston Barber – (redshirt) freshman (6'3, 205); 52 Isaiah Brown – freshman (6'2, 215); 63 Randy Shannon Jr. – (redshirt) sophomore (5'9, 215); Defensive back: 3 Antwan Collier – sophomore (6'3, 195); 8 Zamari Maxwell – (redshirt) freshman (6'1, 175); 13 Bryon Brown – (redshirt) sophomore (6'1, 176); 14 Nevelle Clarke – (redshirt) junior (6'1, 187); 20 Brandon Moore – (redshirt) sophomore (6'0, 186); 21 Rashard Causey – senior (6'0, 195); 25 Kyle Gibson – (redshirt) senior (6'0, 184); 26 Jermaine McMillian – freshman (6'2, 195); 27 Richie Grant – (redshirt) sophomore (6'0, 186); 29 Keenan Johnson – junior (6'0, 180); 30 Alex Swenson – (redshirt) freshman (6'2, 190); 34 Jon Powell – (redshirt) freshman (5'11, 210); 36 Josh Kelly – (redshirt) sophomore (6'1, 200); 37 Aaron Robinson – sophomore (6'1, 185); 38 Caden Larkin – freshman (5'9, 180); 39 Palmer Bachelder– freshman (5'11, 190); 41 Elijah Benoit– (redshirt) freshman (6'0, 170); 42 Rahsaan Lewis – freshman (5'11, 180); 47 Jonathan Gebka – (redshirt) sophomore (6'1, 177); Long snappers: 32 Alex Ward – freshman (6'4, 220); 47 Caleb Perez – (redshirt) senior (6'1, 232)

=== Coaching staff ===
2018 UCF Knights coaching staff
Head coaches: Head coach – Josh Heupel; Asst. HC/Secondary: Willie Martinez; Asst. HC for Offense/Offensive Line: Glen Elarbee; Offensive coaches: Quarterbacks: Jeff Lebby; Running backs: Anthony Tucker; Wide Receivers: Darrell Wyatt; Tight Ends: Jon Cooper; Offensive Quality Control: Matt O'Brien; Offensive Graduate Assistant: Mitch Militello; Graduate Assistant: Robbie Snyder; Defensive coaches: Defensive coordinator/LB's: Randy Shannon; Defensive Line: Shane Burnham; Defensive Backs: Corey Bell; Defensive Quality Control: Tony Gilbert; Defensive Graduate Assistant: Jamie Schultz	Special teams: Special teams coordinator – Nick Toth; Special teams Quality Control: Cliff Odom; Administrative staff: Athletic Director (A.D.) – Danny White; Chief of Staff/Dir. of FB Ops: Billy Ray Johnson; Asst. Director of FB Ops: Cameron Coffman; Dir. of player development: Steve Smith; Dir. of player personnel: Brandon Lawson; Dir. of Sports Performance: Kury Schmidt; Asst. Dir. of Sports Performance FB: Dave Young; Coordinator of FB ops: Kate Miller; Dir. of On-Campus Recruiting: Makenzie Franklin

== Schedule ==
Date	Time	Opponent	Rank	Site	TV	Result	Attendance
August 30	7:00 p.m.	at UConn	No. 21	Rentschler Field; East Hartford, CT (Civil Conflict)	ESPNU	W 56–17	23,081
September 8	6:00 p.m.	South Carolina State (FCS)*	No. 19	Spectrum Stadium; Orlando, FL	ESPN3	W 38–0	43,269
~~September 15~~	~~12:00 p.m.~~	at ~~North Carolina~~*	No. 18	~~Kenan Memorial Stadium~~; ~~Chapel Hill, NC~~	~~ESPNU~~	Canceled (Note: This game was canceled in anticipation of Hurricane Florence. For the third season in a row, a UCF game was canceled or postponed by a hurricane. UCF had one game postponed in 2016 by Hurricane Matthew and two games canceled and one postponed by Hurricane Irma in 2017.)	
September 21	7:00 p.m.	Florida Atlantic*	No. 16	Spectrum Stadium; Orlando, FL	ESPN	W 56–36	44,257
September 29	3:30 p.m.	Pittsburgh*	No. 13	Spectrum Stadium; Orlando, FL	ESPNU	W 45–14	44,904
October 6	7:00 p.m.	SMU	No. 12	Spectrum Stadium; Orlando, FL	ESPNU	W 48–20	40,856
October 13	3:30 p.m.	at Memphis	No. 10	Liberty Bowl Memorial Stadium; Memphis, TN	ABC/ESPN2	W 31–30	38,831
October 20	7:00 p.m.	at East Carolina	No. 10	Dowdy–Ficklen Stadium; Greenville, NC	ESPN2	W 37–10	31,159
November 1	7:30 p.m.	Temple	No. 12	Spectrum Stadium; Orlando, FL (Space Game)	ESPN	W 52–40	41,153
November 10	12:00 p.m.	Navy^{†}	No. 12	Spectrum Stadium; Orlando, FL	ESPN2	W 35–24	44,738
November 17	8:00 p.m.	No. 24 Cincinnati	No. 11	Spectrum Stadium; Orlando, FL (College GameDay) (rivalry)	ABC	W 38–13	47,795
November 23	4:00 p.m.	at South Florida	No. 9	Raymond James Stadium; Tampa, FL (War on I–4)	ESPN	W 38–10	57,626
December 1	3:30 p.m.	Memphis	No. 8	Spectrum Stadium; Orlando, FL (The American Championship)	ABC	W 56–41	45,176
January 1, 2019	1:00 p.m.	vs. No. 11 LSU*	No. 8	State Farm Stadium; Glendale, AZ (Fiesta Bowl)	ESPN	L 32–40	57,246
*Non-conference game; ^{†}Homecoming; Rankings from AP Poll (and CFP Rankings, after October 30) - Released prior to game; All times are in Eastern time

Schedule source:

== Game summaries ==
=== At UConn ===
	1	2	3	4	Total
No. 21 Knights	14	14	14	14	56
Huskies	0	10	0	7	17

The UCF Knights, ranked 21st in the preseason AP Poll, opened the season on the road on Thursday night against division rival UConn, a matchup once briefly known as the Civil Conflict. It was Josh Heupel's first game as head coach, and going into the game UCF held the longest active winning streak in the nation, at 13 games. The Knights routed the Huskies 56–17. Quarterback McKenzie Milton threw for 346 yards and tied a career best with five touchdown passes. The start of the game was marred after Knights defensive back Aaron Robinson was injured on the opening kickoff and removed by ambulance. Robinson spent the night in the hospital diagnosed with a concussion. Milton was rested in the fourth quarter after building a 49–10 lead. Backup quarterback Darriel Mack Jr. came in the game and broke off a 70-yard touchdown run, the longest play of the night. UCF extended their nation's best winning streak to 14 games. The Knights defense forced three turnovers, including a key interception at their own 10-yard line to snuff out a potential scoring drive by the Huskies just before halftime. The Knights also forced a turnover on downs, but ultimately received criticism for poor tackling. The victory was the Knight's 6th consecutive away game victory, tying a school record.

=== South Carolina State ===
	1	2	3	4	Total
Bulldogs	0	0	0	0	0
No. 19 Knights	14	10	14	0	38

The UCF Knights shutout South Carolina State 38–0 to extend the nation's longest winning streak to 15 games. Quarterback McKenzie Milton got off to a shaky start, throwing three interceptions in the first half. Milton managed to throw for 243 yards and one touchdown pass in the victory. The UCF rushing attack were the stars of the game, with 316 combined yards and four touchdowns. The Knights defense held the Bulldogs to only 80 yards passing, made four sacks and three interceptions. The Bulldogs never entered the red zone. It was UCF's third straight home-opener victory.

=== Florida Atlantic ===
	1	2	3	4	Total
Owls	7	10	6	13	36
No. 16 Knights	14	7	21	14	56

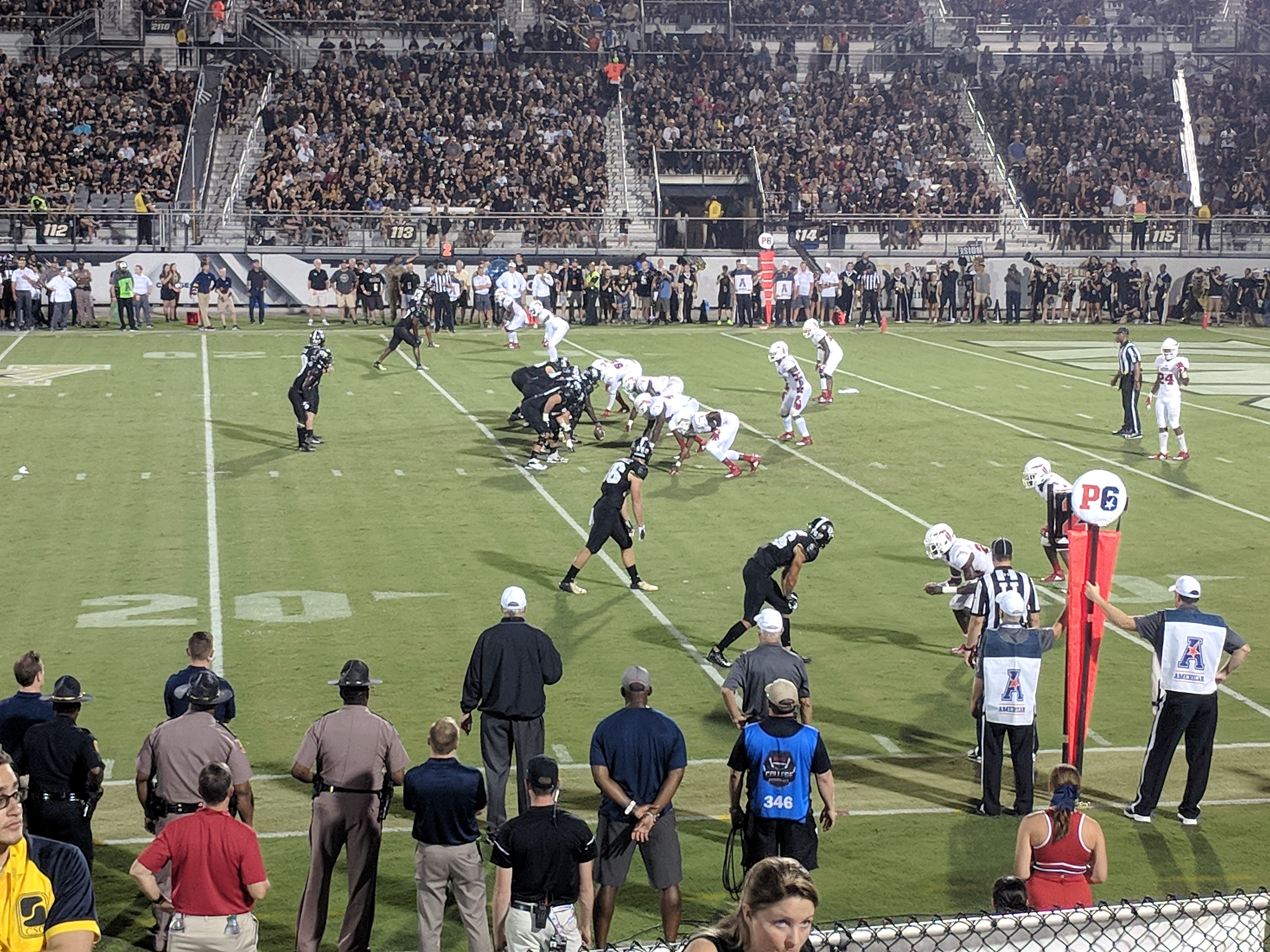
The Knights lining up to score on FAU in the third quarter.

UCF began the game by forcing an interception on the fourth play of the game, and quickly went up 14–0. The Owls then countered with 17 straight points, spurred on by a successful fake punt. The Knights offense went cold in the second quarter, with two three-and-outs, followed by a turnover on downs. A quick five-play, 78-yard drive in the final two minutes of the half, however, gave UCF a four point lead at halftime (21–17). Where UCF's offense may have been unremarkable in the second quarter, the Knights pulled away in the second half, opening with back-to-back touchdowns and led by multiple scores the rest of the night. McKenzie Milton led the Knights with 306 yards passing, 81 yards rushing, and 6 total touchdowns. The Owls were led by Devin Singletary who rushed for 131 yards and 3 scores. UCF won the turnover battle 3–0. It was the third consecutive game that UCF forced three turnovers, and extended the nation's longest winning streak to 16 games, as well as the nation's longest streak of scoring 30 or more points to sixteen.

=== Pittsburgh ===
	1	2	3	4	Total
Panthers	7	0	0	7	14
No. 13 Knights	14	17	7	7	45

McKenzie Milton threw four touchdown passes, and ran for two more touchdowns, as the Knights routed Pitt 45–14. UCF jumped out to a 14–0 lead in the first quarter after a Milton touchdown run and a touchdown reception by Gabe Davis. But Pitt managed to put points on the board after Rafael Araujo-Lopes scored an 86-yard punt return touchdown. UCF took command in the second quarter scoring a touchdown on the following drive. Then the UCF defense thwarted a strong Pitt offensive drive when Richie Grant intercepted Kenny Pickett at the 8 yard line, snuffing out a potential Panthers score. Nine plays later, UCF was back in the endzone with a touchdown pass to Michael Colubiale. After a Pitt three-and-out, UCF drove for a field goal in the closing seconds of the second quarter. The Knights took a 31–7 lead into halftime. Pitt received the ball to start the third quarter, but went three-and-out and were forced to punt. Two plays later, Milton connected to Adrian Killins Jr. for a 71-yard touchdown pass, and a commanding 38–7 lead. Milton managed to lead one additional scoring drive before being rested for the remainder of the fourth quarter. Pitt's offense finally scored a touchdown with 4:46 remaining in regulation to make the final score 45–14. Following the game, UCF crept up one spot in both the AP and Coaches' poll to #12 and #13, respectively. The Knights extended their winning streak, and their streak of scoring 30+ points to 17 games. The win was also their 10th consecutive home victory, one short of the school record.

=== SMU ===
	1	2	3	4	Total
Mustangs	3	7	3	7	20
No. 12 Knights	21	6	7	14	48

The UCF Knights won their 18th consecutive game, extending the nation's longest active winning streak, and tied a school record with their 11th consecutive home game victory. The Knights also extended their streak of scoring 30+ points to 18 games. Quarterback McKenzie Milton threw for 278 yards and two touchdowns, rushed for 17 yards, but suffered a scare late in the second quarter when he was hit with a hard tackle after a 9-yard scramble. SMU received the opening kickoff, and drove 62 yards for a field goal. The Knights then scored 21 unanswered points. Adrian Killins Jr. scored a 15-yard touchdown run for the Knights' first points. Then on the ensuing kickoff, Mustangs returner James Proche fumbled away the ball at the 18 yard line. Three plays later, Milton threw a 14-yard touchdown pass to Dredrick Snelson and a 14–3 lead. On their next drive, Otis Anderson Jr.'s four-yard touchdown run made the score 21–3 at the end of the first quarter. SMU punted on their next two drives, then turned the ball over on downs at the UCF 27 yard line. Milton threw an interception, which led to an SMU touchdown. The Knights managed to put together two long field goal drives, and despite Milton sitting out several plays late in the second quarter, the Knights took a 27–10 lead into halftime. Milton was back in at quarterback in the third quarter, and led the Knights on an 11-play, 88-yard drive, capped off by a dramatic 1-yard touchdown run by defensive lineman Trysten Hill. Facing a 4th & Goal at the 1 yard line, the Knights put Hill in as running back, and he blasted through the line for his first career touchdown. Leading 34–13 entering the fourth quarter, the Knights tacked on two more touchdowns for a final score of 48–20.

Head coach Josh Heupel set a school record by posting the best win–loss record by a coach in his first season after five games. At 5–0, Heupel's team bested Don Jonas's 1979 team which started 4–0 in Division III then lost its fifth ever game. In addition, the Knights found themselves ranked in the top ten for the first time during the regular season.

=== At Memphis ===
	1	2	3	4	Total
No. 10 Knights	7	10	7	7	31
Tigers	17	13	0	0	30

The UCF Knights won their 19th consecutive game, extending the nation's longest winning streak, and broke a school record with their 7th straight away game victory. With their sixth win of the season, they guaranteed themselves a winning regular season, and became bowl-eligible. The Knights beat conference foe Memphis, rallying from a 16-point deficit, on a cool, rainy afternoon at the Liberty Bowl in Memphis, Tennessee. The Tigers offense, behind running back Darrell Henderson dominated the first half of the game. Henderson would rush for 199 yards and one touchdown, and the Knights defense had little answer in the first half. Memphis jumped out to a 17–7 lead in the first quarter. Brady White had an 11-yard touchdown run, then later Henderson broke free for a 25-yard touchdown as time expired in the first quarter. UCF received a kickoff to begin the second quarter. Adrian Killins Jr. returned the kick 44 yards to near midfield. However, UCF later went for it on a 4th & 2 at the Memphis 43. McKenzie Milton's pass to Otis Anderson Jr. fell incomplete, turning the ball over on downs. Memphis subsequently drove seven plays for a field goal, building a 20–7 lead. UCF received the kickoff for a touchback. On their first play from scrimmage, McKenzie Milton threw deep to Gabe Davis, who turned it into a 75-yard touchdown pass. After another Memphis field goal drive, the score was 23–14 in favor of the Tigers. After forcing UCF into a 3-and-out, the Tigers went on a 4-play, 66 yard touchdown drive. Darrell Henderson blasted the defense for runs of 31 yards and 14 yards, setting up Tony Pollard's 19-yard touchdown run. Memphis now led 30–14, UCF's largest deficit during the winning streak. In the closing two minutes, the Knights drove to the Memphis 27 yard line, and Matthew Wright kicked a 44-yard field goal as time expired. Memphis led 30–17 at halftime.

The second half turned into a slug fest, as heavy rains began to pelt the stadium. The UCF defense stepped up their efforts, and forced Memphis into three straight punts to start the second half. However, the UCF offense was unable to yet capitalize. Twice they got into Memphis territory, but both times they were forced to punt. Late in the third quarter, UCF started their drive at their own 20 yard line. Facing a 3rd & 9, Milton scrambled to the 29 yard line, tackled about one yard short of a first down. Still trailing by two scores, UCF decided to go for it on 4th down. Taj McGowan blasted through the line for a first down, then broke free for a shocking 71-yard touchdown run. Memphis fumbled away the ball on the next drive, only to see UCF fumble it right back to them. The Tigers marched down the field to the UCF 21, aided by two UCF 15-yard penalties. At the 23 yard line, Kedarian Jones fumbled away the ball, and UCF recovered. Trailing 30–24, Milton drove the Knights 74 yards for a go-ahead touchdown. At the 7 yard line with 12:14 remaining in regulation, Milton scrambled to the endzone, was hit by a defender, flipped into the air, but crossed the plane for the score. Leading now 31–30, the Knights defense stiffened. With one minute left in the game, UCF punted, and pinned the Tigers back at their own 15 yard line. Brady White quickly drove the Tigers to the UCF 40 yard line. With 18 seconds left in regulation, White under pressure, rolled out to his left, completing a pass to Tony Pollard to the UCF 31 yard line. Pollard was tackled in-bounds, and the clock ran out. UCF held on to win, by the score of 31–30, shutting out the Tigers in the second half, and improving their record against Memphis to 12–1.

=== At East Carolina ===
	1	2	3	4	Total
No. 10 Knights	0	20	3	14	37
Pirates	3	0	7	0	10

The UCF coaching staff created a stir with an unexpected game-time decision to bench quarterback McKenzie Milton for an undisclosed injury. Back-up Darriel Mack Jr. started at quarterback, and led the Knights to a 37–10 win, their 20th consecutive victory. The first quarter saw the Knights offense sputter, punting on their first three drives. East Carolina managed a field goal, and a 3–0 lead at the end of the first quarter. In the second quarter, UCF scored 20 unanswered points. Two field goals by Matthew Wright gave UCF a 6–3 lead with 9:44 to go in the half. On their next drive at the ECU 42 yard line, Mack lateraled the ball to Quadry Jones who threw a 42-yard touchdown pass to a wide open Adrian Killins Jr. ECU fumbled away the ball near midfield, and Mack led UCF on a 10-play drive capped off by a 7-yard touchdown on a quarterback run.

In the third quarter, East Carolina went on a 10-play, 86-yard drive resulting in a 29-yard touchdown pass from Holton Ahlers to Trevon Brown to trim the lead to 20–10. After another UCF field goal, the score was 23-10. As time expired in the third quarter, Knights punter Mac Loudermilk pinned the Pirates back inside their own 1 yard line. However, the Pirates drove 98 yards to the UCF 1 yard line. Facing a 3rd & Goal at the 1, Holton Ahlers' jump pass attempt was broken up and resulted in a fumble. Nate Evans scooped up the ball and ran 94 yards the other way for a UCF touchdown. With just over six minutes left in regulation, Greg McCrae tacked on a 74-yard breakaway touchdown run to make the final score 37–10.

Mack had only 12 completions for 69 yards, but led the team in rushing with 120 yards and one touchdown. It was the school record-extending 8th consecutive road game victory, and 20th consecutive game scoring 30 or more points - now the fifth longest streak in FBS history. The Knights remained 10th in the AP Poll for the third straight week, but slipped from 9th to 10th in the Coaches Poll.

During their bye week on October 27, losses by a number of teams inside the top 25 helped the Knights elevate to 9th in both the AP Poll and Coaches poll.

=== Temple ===
	1	2	3	4	Total
Owls	17	17	0	6	40
No. 9 Knights	14	14	14	10	52

UCF extended their winning streak to 21 games, defeating division foe Temple by the score of 52–40 on the Thursday night space-themed game. Going into the game, the Knights were ranked 12th in the initial CFP ranking. The game turned into a high-scoring affair, with 1,300 total yards of offense. Temple was arguably the stronger team in the first half, as Owls quarterback Anthony Russo threw for 277 yards and three touchdown, and rushed for one touchdown before halftime. The Owls got on the board first with a 41-yard field goal by Will Mobley. The Owls then blocked a UCF field goal attempt. The Knights scored touchdowns on their next two drives, while the Owls scored on their next four drives (three touchdowns, one field goal). The Owls held a ten-point lead at one point during the second quarter, with the highlight being a 70-yard touchdown pass to Randle Jones. The Knights took a 28–27 lead with less than two minutes left in the half. However, Temple drove 64 yards in 1:25 for another touchdown, and a 34–28 halftime lead.

After the explosive first half by the Owls, the Knights defense would stiffen in the second half. The Knights would allow only six points in the second half, forced two turnovers, and managed to take control of the game. To open the third quarter, McKenzie Milton drove the Knights 66 yards in only four plays. Greg McCrae ran for a 32-yard touchdown, and a 35–34 UCF lead. Anthony Russo was intercepted with an over-the-shoulder diving catch by Knights defender Nevelle Clarke, for the game's first turnover. Though the Knights were held to a 3-and-out, they would score on their next drive, a 19-yard touchdown pass to Michael Colubiale. Trailing 42–34, Temple drove ten plays to the UCF 12 yard line. Facing 3rd down & 4, the Owls had back-to-back false start penalties, then their ensuing field attempt was missed.

With just over 13 minutes left in regulation, Temple intercepted McKenzie Milton at the 33 yard line. Russo threw an 8-yard touchdown pass to Ventell Bryant, but Temple's game-tying two-point conversion attempt was stuffed a half yard short of the goal line. UCF maintained the lead 42–40 with 9:44 to go. A 10-yard touchdown run by Taj McGowan put the Knights up 49–40. The Owls drove down the UCF 20 yard line, but facing a 3rd & 10, Trysten Hill sacked Anthony Russo for a 10-yard loss, UCF's first sack of the night. On 4th & 20 at the 30 yard line, Russo's pass attempt the endzone was too high, and the Owls turned the ball over on downs. UCF tacked on a field goal for a 52–40 lead. Temple got the ball back with 1:36 left, but Russo was sacked again, and then intercepted, which clinched the game for the Knights.

The victory, coupled with a loss by Houston two days later, gave UCF the lead in most intra-conference game wins in AAC history (since 2013). UCF has compiled a 32–13 record in AAC play, in addition to a 1–0 record in the AAC Championship Game.

=== Navy ===
	1	2	3	4	Total
Midshipmen	0	3	7	14	24
No. 11 Knights	14	7	7	7	35

Quarterback McKenzie Milton threw for 200 yards, two touchdown passes, rushed for 62 yards, and ran for one touchdown, as UCF defeated Navy. The Knights won their 22nd consecutive game, and 13th consecutive home game. The Knights jumped out to a 21–0 lead, with Greg McCrae's 11-yard touchdown run the first points of the day. Navy fumbled away the ball on their next two drives, both leading to Knights touchdowns. In the second quarter, the Midshipmen went on a ten-play drive, reaching the UCF 3, but a false start penalty followed by an incompletion resulted in Navy managing only a field goal. UCF looked to tack on another touchdown just before halftime, but with 14 seconds remaining, running back Taj McGowan fumbled away the ball at the Navy 13 yard line.

Trailing 21–3, Navy received the second half kickoff, and drove 75 yards in 11 plays for a touchdown. UCF answered on the next drive, with their own 75-yard drive, capped off by Milton's 1-yard touchdown run. At the start of the fourth quarter, Mike Martin's 14-yard touchdown run reduced the deficit to 28–17. UCF put the game mostly out of reach as Milton threw a 12-yard touchdown pass to Dredrick Snelson with 11:28 left in regulation. The Knights forced a Navy punt, then proceeded to run the clock down to 6 minutes. Mac Loudermilk's punt was short, however, giving Navy the ball at the own 49 yard line. Trailing 35–17, Navy scored a touchdown with 3:34 to go, but failed to recover the ensuing onside kick attempt. UCF successfully ran out the clock, and secured the victory.

The Knights defense held Navy quarterback Zach Abey to 0 passing yards on only 2 attempts.

=== Cincinnati ===
	1	2	3	4	Total
No. 19 Bearcats	6	0	0	7	13
No. 11 Knights	7	14	7	10	38

UCF hosted Cincinnati in prime time on Saturday Night Football on ABC. The day started out with UCF hosting College Gameday at the UCF campus for the first time in program history. It was UCF's second appearance on Gameday (they were also the visiting team at South Carolina on September 1, 2005), and Cincinnati's first-ever appearance. The American Athletic Conference East Division title was at stake for both teams — UCF would clinch the division with a victory, and Cincinnati with a win would have a chance to clinch the division in the following week. The Knights routed the Bearcats, as quarterback McKenzie Milton threw for 268 yards, three touchdown passes, and ran for one touchdown. The Knights extended their winning streak to 23 games.

Cincinnati received the opening kickoff. The Bearcats suffered two false start penalties before running a single play, as crowd noise was already a factor. They were forced to punt, pinning the Knights back at their own 7 yard line. On their first play from scrimmage, Malik Clements sacked McKenzie Milton causing a fumble. Kimoni Fitz recovered the ball in the endzone for a Cincinnati touchdown. The extra point was missed, and the Bearcats led 6–0. The Knights went 3-and-out on their next possession, with Cincinnati's defense sacking Milton for the second time. The Bearcats could not capitalize, however, as Cole Smith missed an ensuring 38-yard goal attempt. The Knights offense finally got revved up, as Milton completed two straight passes to Dredrick Snelson (15 and 28 yards), then to Greg McCrae (27 yards). That set up Milton's 3-yard quarterback keeper for a touchdown and a 7–6 lead. The Bearcats drove 50 yards in ten plays to the UCF 24 yard line. With seconds left in the first quarter, Cole Smith's 41-yard field goal attempt was blocked, and recovered by Brandon Moore. Moore ran back the ball 53 yard to the Cincinnati 22 yard line. Three plays later, facing 3rd & 5, Adrian Killins Jr. caught a diving 17-yard touchdown pass from Milton for a 14–6 lead.

UCF added another touchdown in the second quarter, stretching their lead to 21–6. In the final minutes of the half, the Bearcats went on a 15-play drive reaching as far as the UCF 12 yard line. Quarterback Desmond Ridder was sacked by Titus Davis for a loss of 2, then sacked again by Davis, this time fumbling. The Knights recovered, and took a knee to end the half.

The second half belonged to the Knights. Cincinnati committed two turnovers, and a turnover on downs, while the Knights added two more touchdowns, as well as a field goal. The Bearcats finally scored an offensive touchdown with just over 9 minutes remaining in regulation. The Knights won by the score of 38–13, and clinched the AAC east division.

=== At South Florida ===
	1	2	3	4	Total
No. 8 Knights	7	10	7	14	38
Bulls	0	3	7	0	10

UCF faced South Florida in the War on I-4 rivalry. The Knights defeated the Bulls 38–10, however, the game was marred by the devastating, season-ending injury to starting quarterback McKenzie Milton. It was the Knights second straight win in the rivalry, and their second win at Tampa. The Knights extended their active winning streak to 24 games, their away game winning streak to nine games, and tied an NCAA record with their 24th consecutive game scoring 30+ points.

The first quarter opened with punts by both teams, followed by interceptions by both teams. Nick Roberts of the Bulls picked off McKenzie Milton at the UCF 30, and returned the ball to the 12. The Knights defense stiffened, and the Bulls went for it on a 4th & 1 at the 3 yard line. Jordan Cronkrite was stuffed for no gain, and the Bulls turned the ball over on downs. Milton led the Knights on a 97-yard drive, including a 38-yard pass to Gabe Davis, following a 14-yard touchdown pass to Davis, and a 7–0 lead.

Early in the second quarter, the Bulls drove to the UCF 35, and again went for it on a 4th down. For the second time, Jordan Cronkrite was tackled for no gain, and again the Bulls turned the ball over on downs. Six plays later, facing a 3rd & 7 at the USF 30, McKenzie Milton scrambled to the right and was upended after a diving tackle by Mazzi Wilkins. Milton suffered a "traumatic" knee injury, and was carted off the field and brought to Tampa General Hospital for surgery. After a lengthy delay, the game resumed with Matthew Wright kicking a 42-yard field goal for a 10–0 lead.

Darriel Mack Jr. took over at quarterback, and despite the pall cast over the game, the Knights rallied behind him to soundly defeat the Bulls. Mack threw for 81 yards in substitute, but it was the running game and the defense that took over in the second half. Greg McCrae rushed 181 yards on 16 carries, and three touchdowns. The Knights ended with 391 yard rushing, with Taj McGowan adding a touchdown in the fourth quarter. The defense held the Bulls to negative 8 yards of offense in the fourth quarter.

=== American Conference Championship ===
	1	2	3	4	Total
Tigers	24	14	3	0	41
No. 7 Knights	7	14	14	21	56

UCF hosted Memphis in the AAC Championship Game. This was the second consecutive years the Knights hosted the Tigers in the conference championship game, and fourth meeting between the two schools in the past two seasons. With starting quarterback McKenzie Milton out for the season, the Knights rallied from a 17-point halftime deficit behind back-up quarterback Darriel Mack Jr. and won the conference championship for the second year in a row.

UCF won the coin toss and elected to defer to the second half. On the fourth play of the game, Tigers running back Darrell Henderson broke free for a 62-yard touchdown run, and a quick 7–0 lead for Memphis. Knights quarterback Darriel Mack Jr. then fumbled away the ball at the UCF 27, leading to Henderson's second touchdown. The Knights finally got on the board, going 65 yards in 7 plays, with a 14-yard touchdown run by Greg McCrae. The Memphis rushing attack struck again quickly. Facing 3rd & 4 at their own 30 yard line, Patrick Taylor Jr. broke free for a 70-yard touchdown, and 21–7 lead. The miscues for the Knights continued, as Mack was sacked and fumbled, leading to a Tigers field goal and a shocking 24–7 lead at the end of the first quarter.

As the second quarter began, the Knights were driving into Tigers territory. A 20-yard completion from Mack to Gabe Davis sparked the drive, and UCF eventually reached the red zone. Facing 3rd & Goal at the 6, Mack ran up the middle for an apparent touchdown, but the ball was fumbled and bouncing live into the endzone, dangerously close to going out-of-bounds. Michael Colubiale fell on the ball and recovered it for the UCF touchdown. Darrell Henderson continued to punish the Knights defense. On the second play of the next drive, he blasted for an 82-yard touchdown run, and a 31–14 Tigers lead. With under 4 minutes left in the half, a Memphis punt set UCF deep at their own 6 yard line. Mack threw a 44-yard pass to Gabe Davis, then Greg McCrae broke free for a 47-yard run all the way to the 3 yard line. Mack's 4 yard touchdown pass to Jake Hescock made the score 31–21. The Knights forced a 3-and-out and Memphis punted with 1:50 remaining. But Otis Anderson Jr. muffed the punt, and Memphis recovered. With 21 seconds left in the half, Darrell Henderson connected with Sean Dykes for a 4-yard touchdown pass, and the Tigers led 38–21 at halftime.

UCF received the ball to start the third quarter, and proceeded to dominate the second half. The Knights would score five touchdowns on five consecutive drives, erasing a 17-point deficit, and held the Tigers to only three points in the second half. Darrell Henderson was held to only 3 yards in the second half, while Darriel Mack Jr. threw for a touchdown, and ran for four more. Mack sparked the rally with a 54-yard touchdown to a wide-open Otis Anderson Jr., who ran untouched to the endzone. Later, Memphis managed to drive to the UCF 2 yard line, but Brady White's pass to the endzone fell incomplete off the fingertips of Damonte Coxie as he hit the ground. The Tigers settled for a field goal, and clung to a 41–35 lead. The Knights took their first lead of the game (42–41) with a touchdown in the opening seconds of the fourth quarter. With 9:26 remaining, Memphis kicker Riley Patterson missed a 36-yard field goal attempt, and the Knights held their lead. UCF iced the game with two more touchdown, and an interception in the endzone with 33 seconds to go.

Quarterback Darriel Mack Jr., in only his second start for the Knights, finished with 348 yard passing, 1 touchdown pass, 59 yards rushing, and 4 rushing touchdowns, to claim the game's MVP honors. The Knights extended their winning streak to 25 games, and set a new NCAA Division I FBS record with their 25th consecutive game scoring 30 or more points.

=== Vs. LSU (Fiesta Bowl) ===
	1	2	3	4	Total
No. 11 Tigers	10	14	10	6	40
No. 7 Knights	14	7	3	8	32

UCF's 25-game win streak came to a halt with a 40–32 loss against LSU. The Tigers dominated time of possession (44:31) and racked up 555 yards of offense. The Knights offense was held to a season-low 250 total yards. Despite the loss, the Knights extended their NCAA Division I FBS record with their 26th consecutive game scoring 30 or more points.

LSU won the coin toss and elected to receive. Clyde Edwards-Helaire took the opening kickoff back 77 yards all the way to the UCF 16 yard line. The Knights defense, however, stiffened, and kept the Tigers out of the endzone. Cole Tracy kicked a 24-yard field goal for the first points of the game. On their first drive, Darriel Mack Jr. led the Knights on a 6-play, 69-yard drive. A 25-yard touchdown run by Greg McCrae put the Knights up 7–3. LSU drove to the Knights 15 yard line, but quarterback Joe Burrow was intercepted by Brandon Moore at the 7 yard line. Moore ran the ball back 93 yards for the touchdown, and a 14–3 Knights lead. During the return, defensive lineman Joey Connors made a legal blindside block on Burrow, sending him to the ground, but he was able to recover. Nate Evans drew a penalty, however, for taunting Burrow after the play, and it was assessed on the kickoff.

On the next drive, LSU faced a 3rd down & 12 at the UCF 47 yard line. Kyle Gibson sacked quarterback Joe Burrow for a 6-yard loss, but Knights defender Randy Charlton was subsequently flagged for an unsportsmanlike conduct penalty after spiking the ball. The penalty proved costly as it gave LSU new life, and was a turning point in the game. The Tigers were awarded 15 yards and a first down. Six plays later they were in the endzone for a touchdown. Driving across midfield in the closing seconds of the first quarter, quarterback Darriel Mack Jr. was tackled on a run, and fumbled the ball, and LSU recovered.

LSU scored touchdowns on their first two possessions of the second quarter, erasing the deficit, and pulling out to a 24–14 lead. Meanwhile, the Knights went three-and-out twice, and also turned the ball over on downs in Tigers territory. With under two minutes left before halftime, LSU pinned UCF back at their own 5 yard line. Mack led the Knights on a 10-play, 95-yard drive, capped off by a much-needed score. Facing a 3rd down & 14 at the LSU 32 yard line, Mack threw a touchdown pass to Gabe Davis at the back of the endzone with 4 seconds left. At halftime, LSU led 24–21.

UCF got the ball to start the second half, but went three-and-out on their first three drives. LSU scored a 32-yard touchdown from Joe Burrow to Ja'Marr Chase, and also kicked a field goal to go up 34–21. With 3:56 left in the third quarter, Mack Loudermilk's punt was muffed by Tigers return man Justin Jefferson, and UCF recovered at the 20 yard line. The Knights had to settle for a field goal, however, and kicker Matthew Wright trimmed the score to 34–24.

LSU tacked on two more field goals in the fourth quarter, and stretched their lead to 40–24. With just over four minutes remaining in regulation, the Knights went on a swift 75-yard scoring drive. A 2-yard touchdown run by Taj McGowan, followed by a two-point conversion, made the score 40–32 with 2:24 remaining. The Knights attempted an onside kick, but failed to recover. The Knights defense forced a three-and-out, and got one last possession with 35 seconds to go. With 20 seconds left, Mack's pass attempt deflected off of players, and was intercepted by JaCoby Stevens to seal the win for LSU.

== Rankings ==
Ranking movements Legend: ██ Increase in ranking ██ Decrease in ranking т = Tied with team above or below
	Week															
Poll	Pre	1	2	3	4	5	6	7	8	9	10	11	12	13	14	Final
AP	21	19	18	16	13	12	10	10	10	9	11	11	8-T	7	7	11
Coaches	23	20	18	18	14	13	9	9	10	9	11	11	9	7	7	12
CFP	Not released									12	12	11	9	8	8	Not released

== Awards and milestones ==
=== American Athletic Conference honors ===
==== Offensive player of the year ====
- McKenzie Milton

==== American Athletic Conference All-Conference ====
- First Team
- OT Jake Brown
- OG Cole Schneider
- C Jordan Johnson
- QB McKenzie Milton
- LB Nate Evans
- CB Nevelle Clarke
- S Richie Grant
- Second Team
- WR Gabe Davis
- OT Wyatt Miller
- RB Adrian Killins
- DL Titus Davis
- DL Brendon Hayes
- LB Pat Jasinski
- K Matthew Wright
- RS Adrian Killins
- Honorable Mention
- TE Michael Colubiale
- CB Brandon Moore

==== American Athletic Conference Player of the Week ====
- Offense
- September 3: McKenzie Milton
- September 24: McKenzie Milton
- October 1: McKenzie Milton
- October 15: McKenzie Milton
- Defense
- October 8: Titus Davis
- October 22: Nate Evans
- November 19: Titus Davis
- Special teams
- October 15: Matthew Wright
- October 22: Matthew Wright

=== School records ===
- Most consecutive victories: 25 (an American Athletic Conference record)
- Most consecutive games scoring 30+ points: 26 (also an NCAA Division I FBS record)
- Most consecutive home game victories: 15
- Most consecutive away game victories (not including neutral site games): 9
- Most consecutive away game victories (including neutral site game): 10
- Most all-time points scored: K Matthew Wright

=== National awards and honors ===
- Davey O'Brien National Quarterback Award (semi-finalist) — McKenzie Milton
- Jim Thorpe Award (semifinalist) — Richie Grant
- Johnny Unitas Golden Arm Award (candidate) — McKenzie Milton
- Lou Groza Award (semi-finalist) — Matthew Wright
- Maxwell Award (semi-finalist) — McKenzie Milton
- Paul "Bear" Bryant Award (watch list) — Josh Heupel
- Peter Mortell Holder of the Year Award — Mac Loudermilk
- Reveal Suits National Team of the Week (week of November 17)
- Walter Camp Award FBS Offensive Player of the Week (Week 5) — McKenzie Milton
- Walter Camp Player of the Year Award (semi-finalist) — McKenzie Milton

== Players drafted into the NFL ==
Round	Pick	Player	Position	NFL Club
2	58	Trysten Hill	DT	Dallas Cowboys

Additionally, two players were signed as undrafted free agents:

Name	Position	Team
Wyatt Miller	OL	New York Jets
Matthew Wright	K	Pittsburgh Steelers
