= 2018 Peach Bowl (January) =

American college football game

2018 Chick-fil-A Peach Bowl
- CFP New Year’s Six; 50th Peach Bowl
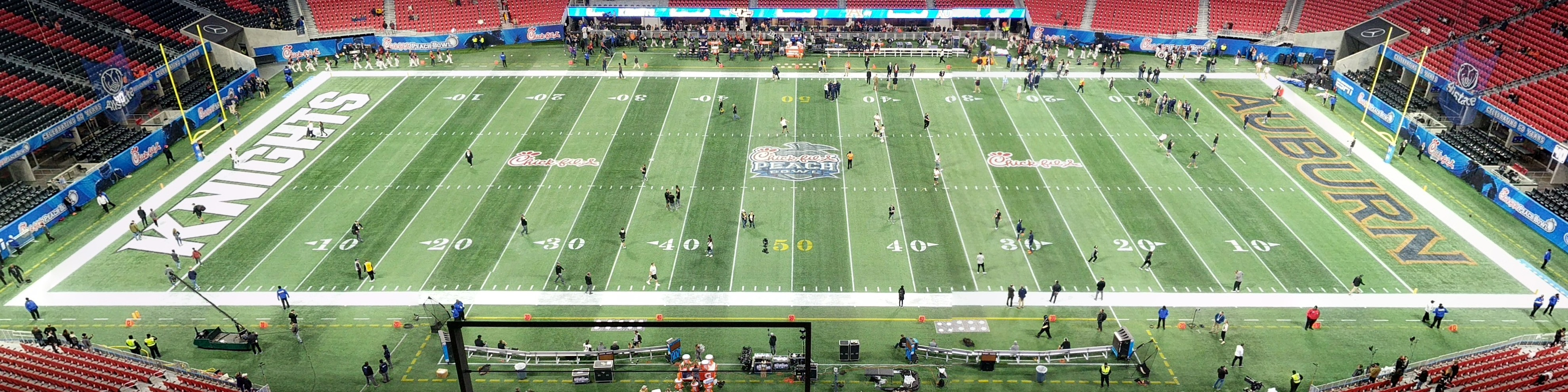
- The field prior to the game
UCF Knights	Auburn Tigers
(12–0)	(10–3)
The American	SEC
34	27
Head coach: Scott Frost	Head coach: Gus Malzahn
AP / Coaches / CFP; 10 / 10 / 12	AP / Coaches / CFP; 7 / 8 / 7
	1	2	3	4	Total
UCF	0	13	7	14	34
Auburn	3	3	14	7	27
- Date: January 1, 2018
- Season: 2017
- Stadium: Mercedes-Benz Stadium
- Location: Atlanta, Georgia
- MVP: McKenzie Milton (QB, UCF) & Shaquem Griffin (LB, UCF)
- Favorite: Auburn by 10.5
- Referee: Brandon Cruse (Big XII)
- Attendance: 71,109
- Payout: US$6,000,000 per team

United States TV coverage
- Network: ESPN and ESPN Radio
- Announcers: Dave Flemming, Brock Huard, and Allison Williams (ESPN) Tom Hart, Jordan Rodgers and Cole Cubelic (ESPN Radio)

The 2018 Peach Bowl was a college football bowl game played on January 1, 2018, between the UCF Knights and the Auburn Tigers. It was the 50th edition of the Peach Bowl, and the first Peach Bowl to be played in Mercedes-Benz Stadium, after spending the previous 25 editions in the now demolished Georgia Dome. The 50th Peach Bowl was one of the College Football Playoff New Year's Six bowl games, and was one of the 2017–18 bowl games concluding the 2017 FBS football season. Sponsored by the Chick-fil-A restaurant franchise, the game was officially known as the Chick-fil-A Peach Bowl.

The game was televised on ESPN and ESPN Deportes, and broadcast on ESPN Radio and XM Satellite Radio.

== Teams ==
The two participants for the game were the UCF Knights (automatically qualifying as the highest ranked conference champion team from the "Group of Five" conferences) and the Auburn Tigers.

At 12–0, UCF was the lone remaining undefeated team in Division I FBS, as Wisconsin had lost to Ohio State in the Big Ten Championship. UCF won the American Athletic Conference (AAC) East Division crown, and won the AAC Championship in a double-overtime shootout over Memphis.

Auburn entered the game 10–3, notching noteworthy wins over then-No. 1 ranked Georgia on November 11 followed by a 26–14 win over then-No. 1 ranked Alabama in the Iron Bowl. Auburn won the SEC Western Division, and elevated to #2 in CFP ranking, but lost the SEC Championship Game in a rematch to Georgia.

Entering the game, the Tigers led the all-time series with the Knights, 3–0; the most recent matchup saw the Tigers defeat the Golden Knights (as the Knights were then known) by a score of 28–10 on November 6, 1999, in Auburn.

== Game summary ==
=== First half ===
The high-powered UCF offense got off to a shaky start, but superb defensive play kept the Knights in the game during the first half. A mishandled snap was fumbled by quarterback McKenzie Milton and recovered by Auburn, which led to a Tigers field goal and a 3–0 lead. Jarrett Stidham then led Auburn on a 14-play, 45-yard drive to the UCF 36 line. Daniel Carlson missed a 53-yard field goal attempt, and the score remained 3–0. Milton, with two long quarterback runs, put the Knights in field goal range, and the score was tied 3–3 partway through the second quarter. Four play later, Stidham near midfield, ran up the middle for a 6-yard gain. But the ball was punched out of his grasp and bounced into the hands of Knights defender Tre Neal. Tight-roping down the sidelines, Neal returned the ball 36 yards to the Auburn 21 yard line. Two plays later, McKenzie Milton scored the game's first touchdown, on an 18-yard quarterback run.

McKenzie Milton's passing numbers were thus far unimpressive, finishing the first half only 3-of-17 for 30 yards. But Milton's 83 yards rushing, coupled with five first half sacks, and eight tackles for loss by the Knights defense, gave UCF a 13–6 halftime lead. Meanwhile, Auburn had racked up 185 yards, and 21:01 time of possession, but had only two field goals to show for it.

=== Second half ===
The third quarter belonged to the Tigers, as Noah Igbinoghene took the second half kickoff back 72 yards to the UCF 26 yard line. Jarrett Stidham threw a 26-yard touchdown pass to Will Hastings, then Kerryon Johnson had a rushing touchdown on the next possession. The Tigers flipped the scoreboard, now leading by the score of 20–13.

McKenzie Milton and the Knights offense finally revved into high gear. Facing 3rd down & 8 at their own 37, Milton connected with Jordan Akins for a 26-yard pass completion to the Auburn 37. Milton followed it up with a 12-yard screen pass to running back Otis Anderson. Hit at the 2 yard line, Anderson dragged two defenders into the endzone for the Knights' second touchdown. The UCF defense forced a three-and-out, and at the start of the fourth quarter, Milton and the Knights took over at their own 41. After two long completions, Milton quickly drove the Knights to the 8 yard line. Under pressure and scrambling, Milton found Dredrick Snelson at the back of the endzone for a leaping touchdown catch and a 27–20 UCF lead.

The Tigers went three-and-out for a second time, and Milton slowly began wearing down the Tigers defense. The Knights drove to the Auburn 8 yard-line, with Tre'Quan Smith's 34-yard catch a key play of the drive. But Matthew Wright's field goal attempt was tipped and blocked. The Knights did manage to burn nearly four minutes off the clock, and clung to a 7-point lead.

At the 40 yard line with just over 6 minutes remaining in regulation, Jarrett Stidham's pass was intercepted by Chequan Burkett, who returned the ball 45 yards for a UCF touchdown. With the Knights now leading 34–20 with under six minutes to go, Auburn fans began heading for the exits, and the UCF side of the stadium turned into a frenzy. Auburn managed a quick touchdown on their next drive, and trimmed the score to 34–27 with 4:12 to play.

Looking to run out the clock and ice the game, the Knights drove to the Auburn 21, where they faced 4th down & 7 with 2:18 left in regulation. Wright's field goal attempt shockingly sailed wide left, and the game continued. With one last chance to tie the game and potentially force overtime, the Tigers drove to the UCF 21 yard line. They had converted on a 4th & 8, and the Knights defense was bending but did not break. With 33 seconds to go, Stidham was under pressure by Shaquem Griffin, and threw up a desperation pass. With no receivers in the area, the ball was easily intercepted in the endzone by Antwan Collier. The Knights took a knee, securing the victory and a 13–0 undefeated season.

=== Post-game ===
McKenzie Milton was selected as the offensive MVP with 245 yards passing, two touchdown passes, no interceptions, 116 yards rushing, and one rushing touchdown. Auburn narrowly edged UCF in total yards (421 to 411), but the Tigers had three turnovers compared to only one for the Knights. Shaquem Griffin had 12 tackles and 1.5 sacks, and pressured Stidham all game. Griffin was voted defensive MVP, in his final game for the Knights. Following the game, the school claimed a national championship. A few days later, UCF was ranked number 1 by the Colley Matrix, an NCAA-designated major selector of football national championships.

=== Scoring summary ===
Scoring summary

Quarter	Time	Drive			Team	Scoring information	Score	
Quarter	Time	Plays	Yards	TOP	Team	Scoring information	UCF	AUB
1	7:01	9	43	3:51	AUB	25-yard field goal by Daniel Carlson	0	3
2	11:11	12	48	3:04	UCF	33-yard field goal by Matthew Wright	3	3
2	8:51	2	21	0:47	UCF	McKenzie Milton 18-yard touchdown run, Matthew Wright kick good	10	3
2	0:45	15	62	4:16	AUB	45-yard field goal by Daniel Carlson	10	6
2	0:00	15	42	0:45	UCF	45-yard field goal by Matthew Wright	13	6
3	14:05	2	26	0:43	AUB	Will Hastings 26-yard touchdown reception from Jarrett Stidham, Daniel Carlson kick good	13	13
3	7:55	10	82	3:37	AUB	Kerryon Johnson 4-yard touchdown run, Daniel Carlson kick good	13	20
3	1:30	7	65	2:44	UCF	Otis Anderson 12-yard touchdown reception from McKenzie Milton, Matthew Wright kick good	20	20
4	11:36	8	59	3:17	UCF	Dredrick Snelson 8-yard touchdown reception from McKenzie Milton, Matthew Wright kick good	27	20
4	5:56				UCF	Interception returned 45 yards for touchdown by Chequan Burkett, Matthew Wright kick good	34	20
4	4:12	6	89	1:37	AUB	Eli Stove 7-yard touchdown run, Daniel Carlson kick good	34	27
"TOP" = time of possession. For other American football terms, see Glossary of American football.							34	27

=== Statistics ===
	1	2	3	4	Total
No. 12 Knights	0	13	7	14	34
No. 7 Tigers	3	3	14	7	27

Statistics	UCF	AUB
First downs	20	28
Plays–yards	71–411	87–421
Rushes–yards	36–169	44–90
Passing yards	242	331
Passing: Comp–Att–Int	16–35–0	28–43–2
Time of possession	25:45	34:15

Team	Category	Player	Statistics
UCF	Passing	McKenzie Milton	16/35, 242 yds, 2 TD
UCF	Rushing	McKenzie Milton	13 car, 116 yds, 1 TD
UCF	Receiving	Tre'Quan Smith	5 rec, 89 yds
AUB	Passing	Jarrett Stidham	28/43, 331 yds, 1 TD, 2 INT
AUB	Rushing	Kerryon Johnson	23 car, 71 yds, 1 TD
AUB	Receiving	Ryan Davis	8 rec, 47 yds

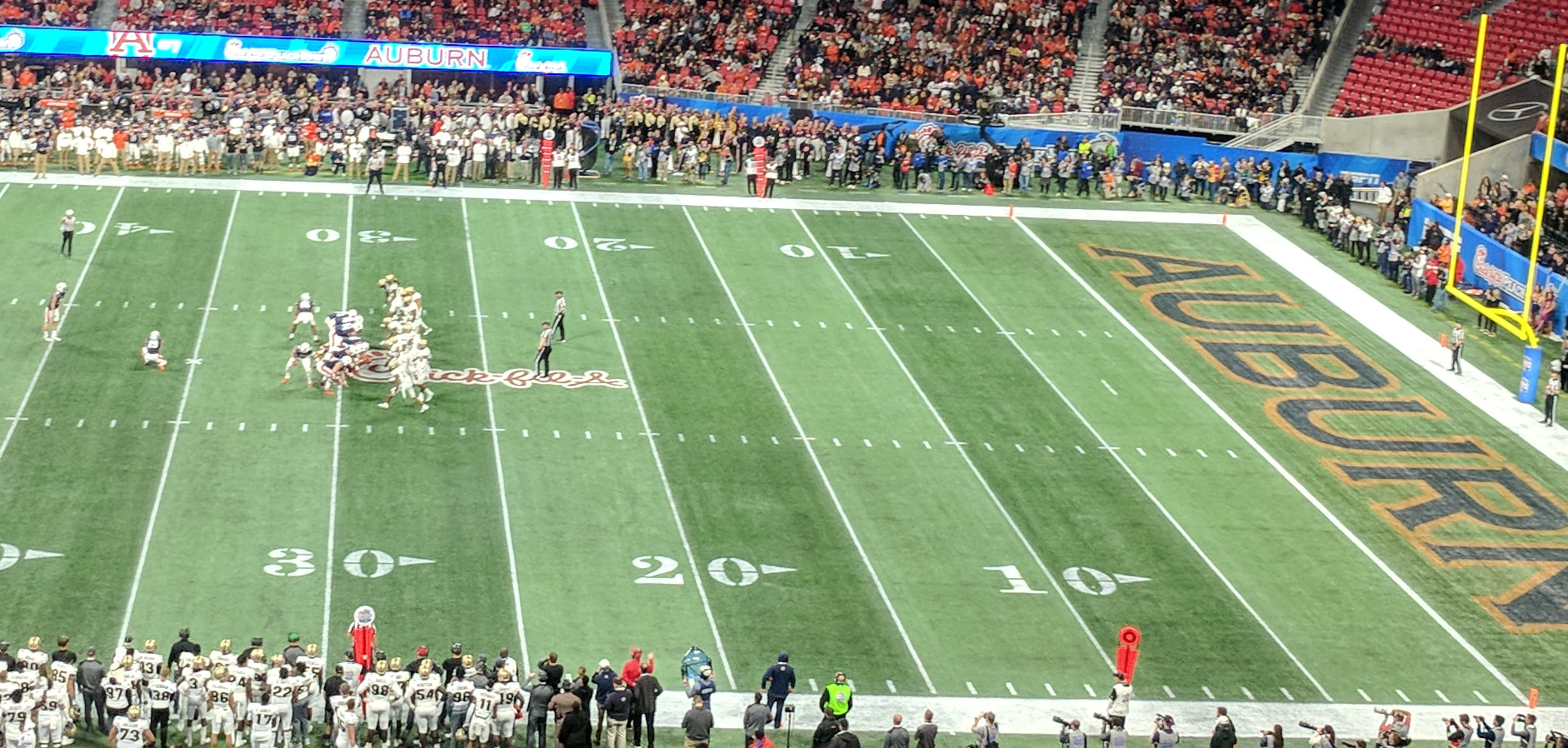
Auburn's Field Goal at the end of the First Half

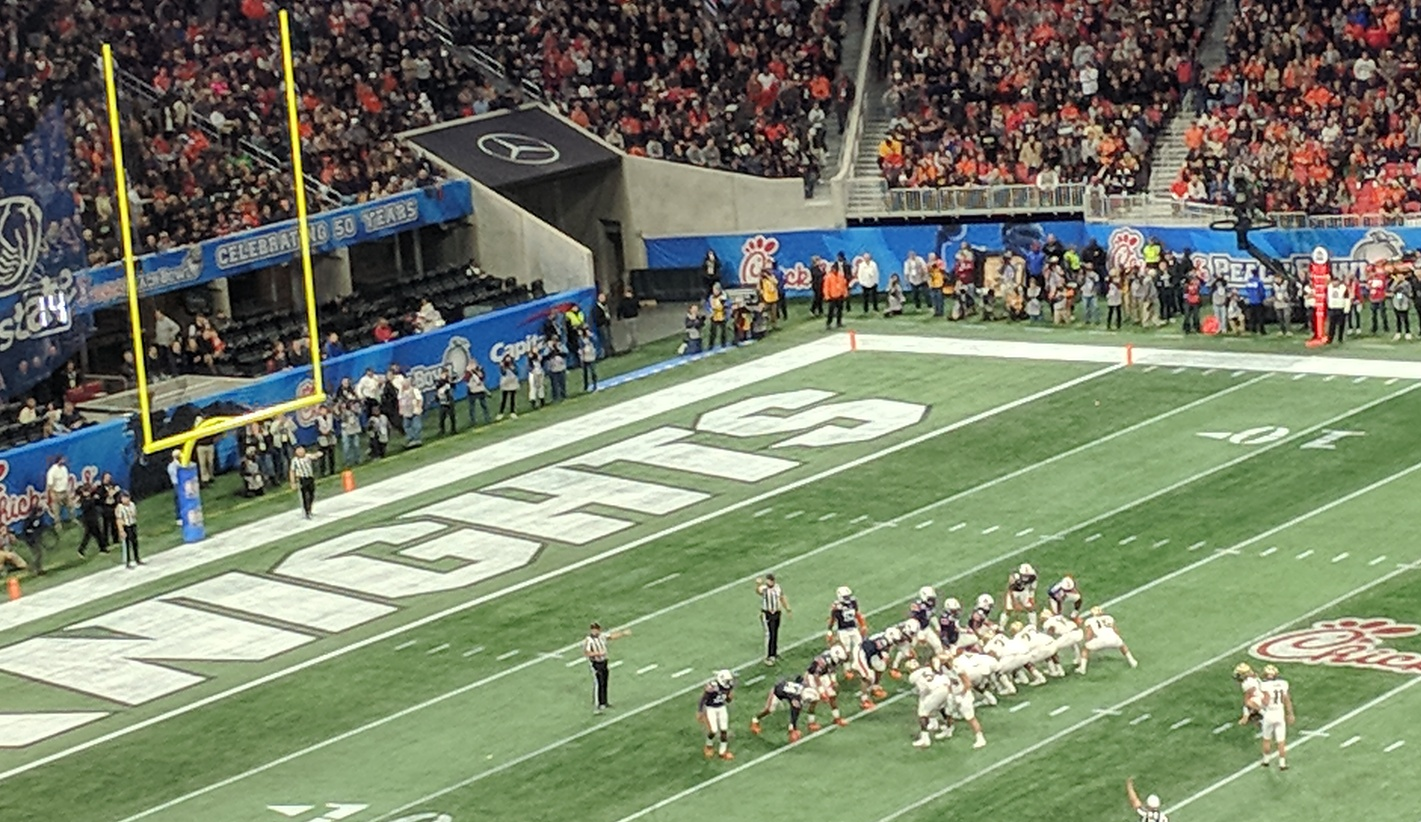
UCF's First Field Goal
