= Liberty Flames football statistical leaders =

The Liberty Flames football statistical leaders are individual statistical leaders of the Liberty Flames football program in various categories, including passing, rushing, receiving, total offense, all-purpose yardage, defensive stats, and kicking. Within those areas, the lists identify single-game, single-season, and career leaders. The Flames represent Liberty University as members of Conference USA (CUSA) in NCAA Division I FBS.

Liberty began competing in intercollegiate football in 1973, when the school was known as Lynchburg Baptist College and was affiliated with the National Christian College Athletic Association. The program gained full varsity status in 1975, the same year in which the school became Liberty Baptist College and joined the NAIA. In 1980, the school joined NCAA Division II, while maintaining its NAIA membership; it left the NAIA in 1983. Two years later, the current name of Liberty University was adopted. The program moved to Division I FCS (known before the 2006 season as Division I-AA) in 1988, remaining at that level through the 2017 season. Just prior to that season, Liberty began a transition to FBS; it was classified as an FBS member for scheduling purposes in 2018 and became a full FBS member in 2019.

Since Liberty started its football program in 1973, full box scores are available for all games, and there is no pre-modern era with incomplete statistics like there is for many college football teams. Additionally, freshmen have been eligible to play on varsity teams during Liberty's entire football history, giving all players who started their college careers at that school the chance to play for four seasons. Also, due to COVID-19 disruptions in the 2020 season, the NCAA ruled that it would not count the 2020 season against any football player's athletic eligibility, giving all players active in that season the opportunity for five years of eligibility instead of the normal four. Additionally, since 2018, players at the FBS level have been allowed to participate in as many as four games in a redshirt season; previously, playing in even one game "burned" the redshirt. Since 2024, postseason games have not counted against the four-game limit. These changes to redshirt rules have given very recent players several extra games to accumulate statistics.

At levels of play below FBS, regular seasons have been shorter than the FBS limit. Before a coming expansion in 2026 to 12 games, matching the FBS limit, the FCS limit is normally 11 games. In Divisions II and III, the limit remains 11 games. However, all levels of play below FBS hold official championship tournaments, providing the opportunity for more games. That said, playoff games are not necessarily included in official statistics maintained by national governing bodies—for example, the NCAA did not include playoff games in official I-AA/FCS statistics until 2002, the same year in which it first included bowl games in official FBS statistics. Additionally, before 2026, the NCAA allowed FCS programs to schedule 12 regular-season games in years when the period starting with the Thursday before Labor Day and ending with the final Saturday in November contains 14 Saturdays. Liberty was thus able to play a 12-game schedule in 2008, 2013, and 2014. Also, Liberty has played in bowl games in each season since it completed its FBS transition ahead of the 2019 season, giving players in those seasons another game to amass statistics. Liberty may potentially play in another game in any given season should it qualify for the CUSA championship game, and did so in 2023.

These lists are updated through the 2025 season.

While Liberty produces a football media guide, it does not make it available as a single volume on its official athletic website. Instead, it publishes separate lists of career, single-season, and single-game leaders in all relevant categories. Unlike many FBS schools, it generally lists only the top 5 on all relevant leaderboards. This article will generally follow Liberty's current practice, with differences as noted in each section. Leaderboards are also expanded beyond the top 5 wherever performances from 2020 or later qualify for top-5 places.

== Passing ==
Liberty lists all 250-yard passing performances on its official athletic site, allowing a full single-game top 10 for yards to be compiled. It also lists all 3,000-yard seasons in school history, making the single-season list a top 6 instead of a top 5.

=== Passing yards ===
Career
| Rank | Player | Yards | Years |
|---|---|---|---|
| 1 | Stephen Calvert | 12,025 | 2016 2017 2018 2019 |
| 2 | Josh Woodrum | 10,266 | 2012 2013 2014 2015 |
| 3 | Robby Justino | 9,548 | 1989 1990 1991 1992 |
| 4 | Paul Johnson | 7,397 | 1986 1987 1988 1989 |
| 5 | Brock Smith | 7,036 | 2005 2006 2007 2008 |

Single season
| Rank | Player | Yards | Year |
|---|---|---|---|
| 1 | Stephen Calvert | 3,663 | 2019 |
| 2 | Stephen Calvert | 3,363 | 2017 |
| 3 | Phil Basso | 3,226 | 1984 |
| 4 | Robby Justino | 3,176 | 1991 |
| 5 | Robby Justino | 3,076 | 1990 |
| 6 | Stephen Calvert | 3,068 | 2018 |
| 7 | Mike Brown | 2,956 | 2010 |
| 8 | Josh Woodrum | 2,947 | 2014 |
| 9 | Kaidon Salter | 2,876 | 2023 |
| 10 | Malik Willis | 2,857 | 2021 |

Single game
| Rank | Player | Yards | Year | Opponent |
|---|---|---|---|---|
| 1 | Stephen Calvert | 474 | 2019 | UMass |
| 2 | Stephen Calvert | 447 | 2017 | Baylor |
| 3 | Phil Basso | 441 | 1984 | Carson–Newman |
| 4 | Robby Justino | 434 | 1991 | Towson |
| 5 | Stephen Calvert | 417 | 2018 | New Mexico |
| 6 | Stephen Calvert | 408 | 1996 | Charleston Southern |
| 7 | Ben Anderson | 398 | 2019 | UMass |
| 8 | Antwan Chiles | 393 | 1994 | Appalachian State |
| | Paul Johnson | 393 | 1989 | Kutztown |
| 10 | Phil Basso | 389 | 1984 | West Georgia |

=== Passing touchdowns ===
Career
| Rank | Player | TDs | Years |
|---|---|---|---|
| 1 | Stephen Calvert | 93 | 2016 2017 2018 2019 |
| 2 | Robby Justino | 64 | 1989 1990 1991 1992 |
| 3 | Josh Woodrum | 61 | 2012 2013 2014 2015 |
| 4 | Kaidon Salter | 56 | 2021 2022 2023 2024 |
| 5 | Brock Smith | 50 | 2005 2006 2007 2008 |
| 6 | Paul Johnson | 49 | 1986 1987 1988 1989 |

Single season
| Rank | Player | TDs | Years |
|---|---|---|---|
| 1 | Kaidon Salter | 32 | 2023 |
| 2 | Stephen Calvert | 29 | 2017 |
| 3 | Stephen Calvert | 28 | 2019 |
| 4 | Malik Willis | 27 | 2021 |
| 5 | Phil Basso | 24 | 1984 |
| | Robby Justino | 24 | 1990 |
| 7 | Mike Brown | 23 | 2010 |
| 8 | Stephen Calvert | 21 | 2018 |
| 9 | Malik Willis | 20 | 2020 |
| 10 | Antwan Chiles | 19 | 1994 |
| | Brock Smith | 19 | 2007 |
| | Brock Smith | 19 | 2008 |
| | Josh Woodrum | 19 | 2013 |
| | Josh Woodrum | 19 | 2014 |

Single game
| Rank | Player | TDs | Year | Opponent |
|---|---|---|---|---|
| 1 | Phil Basso | 6 | 1984 | Mars Hill |
| | Malik Willis | 6 | 2020 | Southern Miss |
| 3 | Robby Justino | 5 | 1991 | West Virginia Tech |
| | Ben Anderson | 5 | 1997 | Cal Poly |
| | Biff Parson | 5 | 2000 | Wingate |
| | Stephen Calvert | 5 | 2017 | Morehead State |
| | Stephen Calvert | 5 | 2019 | Maine |
| | Kaidon Salter | 5 | 2023 | Buffalo |

== Rushing ==
Liberty's list of single-season rushing leaders includes all 1,000-yard rushing seasons (16 to date), allowing a full top 10 to be compiled. The program also lists all 100-yard rushing games on its official athletic site, allowing a full single-game top 10 for yards to be compiled.

=== Rushing yards ===
Career
| Rank | Player | Yards | Years |
|---|---|---|---|
| 1 | Dre Barnes | 4,035 | 2001 2002 2003 2004 |
| 2 | Stacy Nobles | 3,711 | 1996 1997 1998 1999 |
| 3 | Rashad Jennings | 3,633 | 2006 2007 2008 |
| 4 | Frankie Hickson | 2,898 | 2016 2017 2018 2019 |
| 5 | Lawrence Worthington | 2,723 | 1994 1995 1996 |

Single season
| Rank | Player | Yards | Year |
|---|---|---|---|
| 1 | Rashad Jennings | 1,500 | 2008 |
| 2 | Quinton Cooley | 1,401 | 2023 |
| 3 | Dre Barnes | 1,347 | 2003 |
| 4 | Evan Dickens | 1,339 | 2025 |
| 5 | Dre Barnes | 1,304 | 2002 |
| 6 | D. J. Abnar | 1,289 | 2014 |
| 7 | Quinton Cooley | 1,254 | 2024 |
| 8 | Lawrence Worthington | 1,224 | 1994 |
| 9 | Mitchell Clark | 1,185 | 1982 |
| 10 | James Cole | 1,183 | 1983 |

Single game
| Rank | Player | Yards | Year | Opponent |
|---|---|---|---|---|
| 1 | Lawrence Worthington | 305 | 1994 | Charleston Southern |
| 2 | Greg Mosely | 300 | 1981 | Evangel |
| 3 | Evan Dickens | 267 | 2025 | Kennesaw State |
| 4 | Lawrence Worthington | 251 | 1984 | New Haven |
| 5 | Walt Heilig | 250 | 1998 | Delaware State |
| 6 | Zach Terrell | 241 | 2005 | Chattanooga |
| 7 | Chip Smith | 238 | 1976 | Ferrum |
| 8 | Dre Barnes | 230 | 2003 | Norfolk State |
| 9 | Stacy Nobles | 229 | 1998 | Buffalo |
| 10 | Lawrence Worthington | 228 | 1996 | Delaware State |
| | Evan Dickens | 228 | 2025 | Louisiana Tech |

=== Rushing touchdowns ===
Career
| Rank | Player | TDs | Years |
|---|---|---|---|
| 1 | Rashad Jennings | 42 | 2006 2007 2008 |
| 2 | Stacy Nobles | 35 | 1996 1997 1998 1999 |
| | Lawrence Worthington | 35 | 1994 1995 1996 |
| 4 | Charles McCray | 30 | 1985 1986 1988 1989 |
| 5 | Mike Brown | 29 | 2008 2009 2010 2011 |
| | Frankie Hickson | 29 | 2016 2017 2018 2019 |
| | Quinton Cooley | 29 | 2023 2024 |

Single season
| Rank | Player | TDs | Year |
|---|---|---|---|
| 1 | Rashad Jennings | 17 | 2008 |
| 2 | Lawrence Worthington | 16 | 1995 |
| | Desmond Rice | 16 | 2013 |
| | Quinton Cooley | 16 | 2023 |
| | Evan Dickens | 16 | 2025 |
| 6 | Kim Raynor | 15 | 1979 |
| | Charles McCray | 15 | 1998 |
| | Rashad Jennings | 15 | 2007 |
| | D. J. Abnar | 15 | 2014 |

Single game
| Rank | Player | TDs | Year | Opponent |
|---|---|---|---|---|
| 1 | Kim Raynor | 5 | 1979 | Ferrum |
| 2 | 11 times by 9 players | 4 | Most recent: Evan Dickens, 2025 vs. Kennesaw State | |

== Receiving ==
=== Receptions ===
Career
| Rank | Player | Rec | Years |
|---|---|---|---|
| 1 | Antonio Gandy-Golden | 240 | 2016 2017 2018 2019 |
| 2 | Darrin Peterson | 215 | 2012 2013 2014 2015 |
| 3 | Chris Summers | 188 | 2008 2009 2010 2011 |
| 4 | Pat Nelson | 176 | 1988 1989 1990 1991 |
| 5 | Demario Douglas | 172 | 2019 2020 2021 2022 |
| 6 | Pat Kelly | 162 | 2009 2010 2011 2012 |

Single season
| Rank | Player | Rec | Year |
|---|---|---|---|
| 1 | Darrin Peterson | 85 | 2014 |
| 2 | Pat Nelson | 81 | 1991 |
| 3 | Pat Kelly | 80 | 2012 |
| 4 | Antonio Gandy-Golden | 79 | 2019 |
| | Demario Douglas | 79 | 2022 |
| 6 | Fred Banks | 77 | 1984 |

Single game
| Rank | Player | Rec | Year | Opponent |
|---|---|---|---|---|
| 1 | Pat Kelly | 16 | 2012 | Coastal Carolina |
| 2 | Josh Stoffe | 15 | 2001 | South Florida |
| | Chris Summers | 15 | 2011 | Stony Brook |
| 4 | Chris Summers | 14 | 2009 | Lafayette |
| | Pat Kelly | 14 | 2012 | Montana |

=== Receiving yards ===
Liberty includes all 1,000-yard seasons in its official leaderboards, resulting in a top 9 single-season list instead of a top 5. The program also lists all 100-yard receiving games on its official athletic site, allowing a full single-game top 10 for yards to be compiled.

Career
| Rank | Player | Yards | Year |
|---|---|---|---|
| 1 | Antonio Gandy-Golden | 3,184 | 2016 2017 2018 2019 |
| 2 | Darrin Peterson | 3,170 | 2012 2013 2014 2015 |
| 3 | Chris Summers | 2,712 | 2008 2009 2010 2011 |
| 4 | Kelvin Edwards | 2,546 | 1982 1983 1984 1985 |
| 5 | Pat Nelson | 2,447 | 1988 1989 1990 1991 |

Single season
| Rank | Player | Yards | Year |
|---|---|---|---|
| 1 | Antonio Gandy-Golden | 1,396 | 2019 |
| 2 | Darrin Peterson | 1,379 | 2014 |
| 3 | Chris Summers | 1,081 | 2010 |
| 4 | Pat Nelson | 1,075 | 1991 |
| 5 | CJ Daniels | 1,067 | 2023 |
| 6 | Antonio Gandy-Golden | 1,066 | 2017 |
| 7 | Dominic Bolden | 1,056 | 2008 |
| 8 | Antonio Gandy-Golden | 1,037 | 2018 |
| 9 | Fred Banks | 1,029 | 1984 |
| 10 | Chris Summers | 1,014 | 2011 |

Single game
| Rank | Player | Yards | Year | Opponent |
|---|---|---|---|---|
| 1 | Antonio Gandy-Golden | 245 | 2018 | New Mexico |
| 2 | Chris Summers | 240 | 2011 | Stony Brook |
| 3 | Pat Kelly | 235 | 2010 | Stony Brook |
| 4 | Chris Summers | 205 | 2011 | Lehigh |
| | Antonio Gandy-Golden | 205 | 2018 | UMass |
| 6 | Mike Brown | 198 | 2009 | Gardner–Webb |
| 7 | Antonio Gandy-Golden | 192 | 2017 | Baylor |
| 8 | Courtney Freeman | 186 | 1996 | Western Kentucky |
| 9 | Chris Patterson | 184 | 1979 | Gardner–Webb |
| | Chris Patterson | 184 | 1981 | Catawba |

=== Receiving touchdowns ===
Career
| Rank | Player | TDs | Years |
|---|---|---|---|
| 1 | Antonio Gandy-Golden | 33 | 2016 2017 2018 2019 |
| 2 | Darrin Peterson | 27 | 2012 2013 2014 2015 |
| 3 | Chris Summers | 26 | 2008 2009 2010 2011 |
| 4 | Kelvin Edwards | 22 | 1982 1983 1984 1985 |
| 5 | Courtney Freeman | 21 | 1994 1995 1996 1997 |
| | CJ Daniels | 21 | 2020 2021 2022 2023 |

Single season
| Rank | Player | Yards | Year |
|---|---|---|---|
| 1 | Chris Summers | 15 | 2010 |
| 2 | Darrin Peterson | 12 | 2014 |
| 3 | Eric Green | 10 | 1989 |
| | B. J. Farrow | 10 | 2017 |
| | Antonio Gandy-Golden | 10 | 2017 |
| | Antonio Gandy-Golden | 10 | 2018 |
| | Antonio Gandy-Golden | 10 | 2019 |
| | CJ Daniels | 10 | 2023 |

Single game
| Rank | Player | TDs | Year | Opponent |
|---|---|---|---|---|
| 1 | 16 times by 13 players | 3 | Most recent: Reese Smith 2024 vs. East Carolina | |

== Total offense ==
Total offense is the sum of passing and rushing statistics. It does not include receiving or returns.

=== Total offense yards ===
Liberty lists all instances of 250 yards of total offense in a game on its official athletic site, allowing a full single-game top 10 to be compiled. The program's lists of total offense leaders do not break down leaders' performances by type of play (passing or rushing). However, these breakdowns can be extrapolated for all performances in the top 10 of the single-game list, as well as most of the career and single-season leaders, using totals from other statistical lists available on the program website.

Career
| Rank | Player | Yards | Years |
|---|---|---|---|
| 1 | Stephen Calvert | 11,552 | 2016 2017 2018 2019 |
| 2 | Josh Woodrum | 10,690 | 2012 2013 2014 2015 |
| 3 | Robby Justino | 8,806 | 1989 1990 1991 1992 |
| 4 | Mike Brown | 7,947 | 2008 2009 2010 2011 |
| 5 | Kaidon Salter | 7,895 | 2021 2022 2023 2024 |
| 6 | Brock Smith | 7,223 | 2005 2006 2007 2008 |

Single season
| Rank | Player | Yards | Year |
|---|---|---|---|
| 1 | Kaidon Salter | 3,965 | 2023 |
| 2 | Mike Brown | 3,810 | 2010 |
| 3 | Malik Willis | 3,735 | 2021 |
| 4 | Stephen Calvert | 3,512 | 2019 |
| 5 | Stephen Calvert | 3,339 | 2017 |
| 6 | Malik Willis | 3,204 | 2020 |
| 7 | Josh Woodrum | 3,201 | 2014 |
| 8 | Phil Basso | 3,127 | 1984 |

Single game
| Rank | Player | Yards | Year | Opponent |
|---|---|---|---|---|
| 1 | Mike Brown | 494 | 2010 | Stony Brook |
| 2 | Kaidon Salter | 484 | 2023 | New Mexico State (C–USA Championship Game) |
| 3 | Stephen Calvert | 480 | 2019 | UMass |
| 4 | Stephen Calvert | 447 | 2017 | Baylor |
| 5 | Malik Willis | 442 | 2020 | Southern Miss |
| 6 | Antwan Chiles | 434 | 1994 | Appalachian State |
| 7 | Malik Willis | 431 | 2021 | UAB |
| 8 | Stephen Calvert | 425 | 2017 | Monmouth |
| 9 | Mike Brown | 421 | 2010 | Presbyterian |
| 10 | Robby Justino | 418 | 1991 | Towson |

=== Touchdowns responsible for ===
"Touchdowns responsible for" is the official NCAA term for combined passing and rushing touchdowns. Liberty does not list single-game leaders.

Career
| Rank | Player | TDs | Years |
|---|---|---|---|
| 1 | Stephen Calvert | 96 | 2016 2017 2018 2019 |
| 2 | Josh Woodrum | 77 | 2012 2013 2014 2015 |
| | Kaidon Salter | 77 | 2021 2022 2023 2024 |
| 4 | Malik Willis | 74 | 2020 2021 |
| 5 | Mike Brown | 74 | 2008 2009 2010 2011 |
| 6 | Robby Justino | 66 | 1989 1990 1991 1992 |
| 7 | Brock Smith | 54 | 2005 2006 2007 2008 |

Single season
| Rank | Player | TDs | Year |
|---|---|---|---|
| 1 | Kaidon Salter | 44 | 2023 |
| 2 | Malik Willis | 40 | 2021 |
| 3 | Malik Willis | 34 | 2020 |
| 4 | Mike Brown | 32 | 2010 |
| 5 | Stephen Calvert | 30 | 2017 |
| 6 | Josh Woodrum | 28 | 2014 |
| | Stephen Calvert | 28 | 2017 |
| 8 | Mike Brown | 27 | 2011 |

== All-purpose yardage ==
All-purpose yardage is the sum of all yards credited to a player who is in possession of the ball. It includes rushing, receiving, and returns, but does not include passing.

Liberty does not break down its leaders' performances over any time frame (career, season, game) by type of play.

Career
| Rank | Player | Yards | Years |
|---|---|---|---|
| 1 | Frankie Hickson | 4,494 | 2016 2017 2018 2019 |
| 2 | Dre Barnes | 4,461 | 2001 2002 2003 2004 |
| 3 | Stacy Nobles | 4,220 | 1996 1997 1998 1999 |
| 4 | Rashad Jennings | 4,155 | 2006 2007 2008 |
| 5 | Antonio Gandy-Golden | 3,814 | 2016 2017 2018 2019 |

Single season
| Rank | Player | Yards | Year |
|---|---|---|---|
| 1 | Dominic Bolden | 1,814 | 2008 |
| 2 | Rashad Jennings | 1,690 | 2008 |
| 3 | Lawrence Worthington | 1,610 | 1994 |
| 4 | James Cole | 1,449 | 1993 |
| 5 | Andrew McFadden | 1,446 | 1996 |

Single game
| Rank | Player | Yards | Year | Opponent |
|---|---|---|---|---|
| 1 | Walt Heilig | 315 | 1998 | Delaware State |
| 2 | Lawrence Worthington | 314 | 1994 | New Haven |
| 3 | Lawrence Worthington | 306 | 1994 | Charleston Southern |
| 4 | Greg Mosely | 300 | 1981 | Evangel |
| 5 | Evan Dickens | 283 | 2025 | Kennesaw State |
| 6 | Johnny Shepherd | 271 | 1978 | Gardner–Webb |
| | Mike Brown | 271 | 2009 | West Virginia |

== Defense ==
=== Interceptions ===
Career
| Rank | Player | Ints | Years |
|---|---|---|---|
| 1 | Dave Hertzler | 26 | 1977 1978 1979 1980 |
| 2 | Rod Gladfelter | 21 | 1976 1977 1978 1979 |
| 3 | Earl Fisher | 16 | 1980 1981 1982 1983 |
| | Randall State | 16 | 1998 1999 2000 2001 2002 |
| 5 | Jacob Hagen | 15 | 2011 2012 2013 2014 |

Single season
| Rank | Player | Ints | Year |
|---|---|---|---|
| 1 | Dave Hertzler | 11 | 1978 |
| 2 | Dave Hertzler | 10 | 1978 |
| 3 | Rod Gladfelter | 9 | 1978 |
| 4 | Earl Fisher | 8 | 1982 |
| | Jacob Hagen | 8 | 2014 |

Single game
| Rank | Player | Ints | Year | Opponent |
|---|---|---|---|---|
| 1 | Dave Hertzler | 4 | 1980 | Lenoir–Rhyne |
| 2 | Ernie Antolik | 3 | 1988 | Tennessee Tech |
| | Jacob Hagen | 3 | 2014 | Charleston Southern |
| | Jeremy Peters | 3 | 2017 | Gardner–Webb |
| 5 | 12 times by 12 players | 2 | Most recent: Amarian Williams, 2024 vs. Western Kentucky | |

=== Tackles ===
Career
| Rank | Player | Tackles | Years |
|---|---|---|---|
| 1 | John Sanders | 550 | 1979 1980 1981 1982 |
| 2 | Mickey Paige | 427 | 1985 1986 1987 1988 |
| 3 | Jesse Riley | 394 | 1995 1996 1997 1998 |
| 4 | Damon Bomar | 385 | 1993 1994 1995 1996 |
| | Joe Seamster | 385 | 1982 1983 1984 1985 |

Single season
| Rank | Player | Tackles | Year |
|---|---|---|---|
| 1 | Dion Krause | 151 | 1993 |
| 2 | Mickey Paige | 150 | 1987 |
| 3 | John Sanders | 147 | 1979 |
| 4 | Dwight Jones | 146 | 1988 |
| 5 | Scott Hoefling | 145 | 1980 |

Single game
| Rank | Player | Tackles | Year | Opponent |
|---|---|---|---|---|
| 1 | Dave Hertzler | 25 | 1980 | Catawba |
| | Joe Seamster | 25 | 1984 | Delaware State |
| 3 | Joe Seamster | 24 | 1985 | Southern Connecticut |
| | Mickey Paige | 24 | 1987 | Newberry |
| 5 | Mickey Paige | 23 | 1988 | Tennessee Tech |

=== Sacks ===
Career
| Rank | Player | Sacks | Years |
|---|---|---|---|
| 1 | Chima Uzowihe | 25.0 | 2012 2013 2014 2015 |
| 2 | Aaron DeBerry | 22.0 | 2000 2001 2002 2003 |
| 3 | Jesse Lemonier | 20.5 | 2018 2019 |
| 4 | Juwan Wells | 19.5 | 2015 2016 2015 2018 |
| 5 | Rodney Degrade | 19.0 | 1994 1995 1996 |

Single season
| Rank | Player | Sacks | Year |
|---|---|---|---|
| 1 | Eric Simmons | 13.0 | 1981 |
| 2 | Jesse Lemonier | 10.5 | 2019 |
| 3 | Larkin Harsey | 10.0 | 1990 |
| | Jesse Lemonier | 10.0 | 2018 |
| 5 | Toby Onyechi | 9.5 | 2014 |

Single game
| Rank | Player | Sacks | Year | Opponent |
|---|---|---|---|---|
| 1 | Aaron DeBerry | 4.0 | 2003 | Charleston Southern |
| 2 | 15 times by 12 players | 3.0 | Most recent: Kendy Charles, 2021 vs. Old Dominion | |

== Kicking ==
Liberty does not list field goal percentage leaders over any time frame on its athletics site.

=== Field goals made ===
Career
| Rank | Player | FGs | Years |
|---|---|---|---|
| 1 | Matt Bevins | 58 | 2008 2009 2010 2011 |
| 2 | John Lunsford | 48 | 2012 2013 2014 2015 |
| 3 | Alex Probert | 46 | 2016 2017 2018 2019 |
| 4 | Daniel Whitehead | 43 | 1991 1992 1993 1994 |
| 5 | Phillip Harrelson | 35 | 1995 1996 1997 1998 |

Single season
| Rank | Player | FGs | Year |
|---|---|---|---|
| 1 | Matt Bevins | 22 | 2009 |
| 2 | Matt Bevins | 20 | 2010 |
| 3 | John Lunsford | 19 | 2014 |
| 4 | Noah Greenbaum | 15 | 2007 |
| | Alex Probert | 15 | 2016 |
| | Jay Billingsley | 15 | 2025 |

Single game
| Rank | Player | FGs | Year | Opponent |
|---|---|---|---|---|
| 1 | Phillip Harrelson | 4 | 1997 | Delaware State |
| | Matt Bevins | 4 | 2008 | Elon |
| | Matt Bevins | 4 | 2009 | VMI |
| | Matt Bevins | 4 | 2010 | Gardner–Webb |
| | Matt Bevins | 4 | 2010 | Stony Brook |
| | Alex Probert | 4 | 2017 | Baylor |
| | Jay Billingsley | 4 | 2025 | UTEP |
