= List of Liberty Flames in the NFL draft =

This is a list of Liberty Flames football players in the NFL draft.

== Key ==
B	Back	K	Kicker	NT	Nose tackle
C	Center	LB	Linebacker	FB	Fullback
DB	Defensive back	P	Punter	HB	Halfback
DE	Defensive end	QB	Quarterback	WR	Wide receiver
DT	Defensive tackle	RB	Running back	G	Guard
E	End	T	Offensive tackle	TE	Tight end

== Selections ==
Year	Round	Pick	Player	Team	Position	Notes
1985	8	203	Fred Banks	Cleveland Browns	WR	
1986	4	88	Kelvin Edwards	New Orleans Saints	WR	
1989	11	292	Richard Shelton	Denver Broncos	DB	
1990	1	21	Eric Green	Pittsburgh Steelers	TE	
1990	10	271	Donald Smith	Minnesota Vikings	DB	
2009	7	250	Rashad Jennings	Jacksonville Jaguars	RB	
2014	4	125	Walt Aikens	Miami Dolphins	DB	
2020	4	142	Antonio Gandy-Golden	Washington Redskins	WR	
2022	3	86	Malik Willis	Tennessee Titans	QB	
2023	6	210	Demario Douglas	New England Patriots	WR	
