= 2019 New Mexico State Aggies football team =

American college football season

2019 New Mexico State Aggies football
- Conference: Independent
- Record: 2–10
- Head coach: Doug Martin (7th season)
- Associate head coach: Oliver Soukup (3rd season)
- Offensive scheme: Air raid
- Defensive coordinator: Frank Spaziani (4th season)
- Base defense: 3–3–5
- Home stadium: Aggie Memorial Stadium

2019 NCAA Division I FBS independents football records
	Conf.			Overall
Team	W		L	W		L
No. 12 Notre Dame		–		11	–	2
Liberty		–		8	–	5
BYU		–		7	–	6
Army		–		5	–	8
New Mexico State		–		2	–	10
UMass		–		1	–	11
Rankings from AP Poll

The 2019 New Mexico State Aggies football team represented New Mexico State University as an independent during the 2019 NCAA Division I FBS football season. Led by seventh-year head coach Doug Martin, the Aggies compiled a record of 2–10. New Mexico State played home games at Aggie Memorial Stadium in Las Cruces, New Mexico.

== Schedule ==
Date	Time	Opponent	Site	TV	Result	Attendance
August 31	8:00 p.m.	at No. 23 Washington State	Martin Stadium; Pullman, WA	P12N	L 7–58	27,228
September 7	2:00 p.m.	at No. 2 Alabama	Bryant–Denny Stadium; Tuscaloosa, AL	SECN	L 10–62	100,710
September 14	6:00 p.m.	San Diego State	Aggie Memorial Stadium; Las Cruces, NM	FloSports, FSNAZ+	L 10–31	10,123
September 21	2:30 p.m.	at New Mexico	Dreamstyle Stadium; Albuquerque, NM (Rio Grande Rivalry)	ATTSNRM	L 52–55	27,269
September 28	6:00 p.m.	Fresno State	Aggie Memorial Stadium; Las Cruces, NM	FloSports, FSNAZ+	L 17–30	8,872
October 5	6:00 p.m.	Liberty^{†}	Aggie Memorial Stadium; Las Cruces, NM	FloSports, FSNAZ+	L 13–20	23,140
October 12	1:00 p.m.	at Central Michigan	Kelly/Shorts Stadium; Mount Pleasant, MI	ESPN3	L 28–42	15,764
October 26	1:00 p.m.	at Georgia Southern	Paulson Stadium; Statesboro, GA	ESPN3	L 7–41	10,907
November 9	2:00 p.m.	at Ole Miss	Vaught–Hemingway Stadium; Oxford, MS	SECN	L 3–41	45,973
November 16	2:00 p.m.	Incarnate Word	Aggie Memorial Stadium; Las Cruces, NM	FloSports, FSNAZ+	W 41–28	25,804
November 23	2:00 p.m.	UTEP	Aggie Memorial Stadium; Las Cruces, NM (Battle of I-10)	FloSports, FSNAZ+	W 44–35	21,584
November 30	12:00 p.m.	at Liberty	Williams Stadium; Lynchburg, VA	ESPN+	L 28–49	18,674
^{†}Homecoming; Rankings from AP Poll released prior to the game; All times are in Mountain time

== Game summaries ==
=== At No. 23 Washington State ===
New Mexico State at Washington State

Team	1	2	3	4	Total
Aggies	7	0	0	0	7
• No. 23 Cougars	14	21	13	10	58

- Date: August 31
- Location: Martin Stadium
  Pullman, WA
- Game start: 7:10 p.m. PDT
- Elapsed time: 3 hours and 4 minutes
- Game attendance: 27,228
- Game weather: Clear • Temperature: 83 °F (28 °C) • Wind: W 5–10 MPH
- Referee: Brandon Cruse
- TV announcers (P12N): Guy Haberman, Chad Brown and Samantha Peszek

Scoring summary
1	09:21	WSU	Rodrick Fisher 41–yard pass from Anthony Gordon (Blake Mazza kick)	WSU 7–0
1	06:25	NMSU	Josh Adkins 3–yard run (Dylan Brown kick)	TIE 7–7
1	05:11	WSU	Dezmon Patmon 48–yard pass from Anthony Gordon (Blake Mazza kick)	WSU 14–7
2	11:07	WSU	Easop Winston 19–yard pass from Anthony Gordon (Blake Mazza kick)	WSU 21–7
2	09:55	WSU	Travell Harris 54–yard pass from Anthony Gordon (Blake Mazza kick)	WSU 28–7
2	01:23	WSU	Max Borghi 12–yard run (Blake Mazza kick)	WSU 35–7
3	11:56	WSU	Travell Harris 20–yard pass from Anthony Gordon (Blake Mazza kick)	WSU 42–7
3	08:38	WSU	Blake Mazza 45–yard field goal	WSU 45–7
3	06:12	WSU	Blake Mazza 50–yard field goal	WSU 48–7
4	14:13	WSU	Renard Bell 9–yard pass from Gage Gubrud (Blake Mazza kick)	WSU 55–7
4	12:18	WSU	Blake Mazza 34–yard field goal	WSU 58–7

Statistics	NMSU	WSU
First downs	18	28
Total yards	317	618
Rushing yards	96	111
Passing yards	221	507
Turnovers	3	0
Time of possession	25:19	34:41

Team	Category	Player	Statistics
New Mexico State	Passing	Josh Adkins	28/42, 221 yards, 2 INT
New Mexico State	Rushing	Jason Huntley	9 rushes, 57 yards
New Mexico State	Receiving	O. J. Clark	7 receptions, 47 yards
Washington State	Passing	Anthony Gordon	29/35, 420 yards, 5 TD
Washington State	Rushing	Max Borghi	10 rushes, 128 yards, TD
Washington State	Receiving	Dezmon Patmon	7 receptions, 103 yards, TD

=== At No. 2 Alabama ===
New Mexico State at Alabama

Team	1	2	3	4	Total
Aggies	0	0	7	3	10
• No. 2 Crimson Tide	21	17	24	0	62

- Date: September 7
- Location: Bryant–Denny Stadium
  Tuscaloosa, AL
- Game start: 3:01 p.m. CDT
- Elapsed time: 3 hours and 5 minutes
- Game attendance: 100,710
- Game weather: Sunny and hot • Temperature: 94 °F (34 °C) • Wind: WNW 7 MPH
- Referee: Ken Williamson
- TV announcers (SECN): Taylor Zarzour, Matt Stinchcomb and Alyssa Lang

Scoring summary
1	14:47	ALA	Henry Ruggs III 75–yard run (Will Reichard kick)	ALA 7–0
1	09:08	ALA	Jerry Jeudy 21–yard pass from Tua Tagovailoa (Will Reichard kick)	ALA 14–0
1	00:00	ALA	Jerry Jeudy 23–yard pass from Tua Tagovailoa (Will Reichard kick)	ALA 21–0
2	10:08	ALA	Henry Ruggs III 10–yard pass from Tua Tagovailoa (Will Reichard kick)	ALA 28–0
2	03:49	ALA	Tua Tagovailoa 25–yard run (Will Reichard kick)	ALA 35–0
2	01:04	ALA	Will Reichard 48–yard field goal	ALA 38–0
3	08:20	ALA	Najee Harris 8–yard run (Will Reichard kick)	ALA 45–0
3	05:59	NMSU	Jason Huntley 4–yard pass from Josh Adkins (Dylan Brown kick)	ALA 45–7
3	03:19	ALA	Jerry Jeudy 19–yard pass from Mac Jones (Will Reichard kick)	ALA 52–7
3	01:40	ALA	Will Reichard 49–yard field goal	ALA 55–7
3	00:13	ALA	Keilan Robinson 74–yard run (Will Reichard kick)	ALA 62–7
4	10:00	NMSU	Dylan Brown 43–yard field goal	ALA 62–10

Statistics	NMSU	ALA
First downs	14	23
Total yards	262	603
Rushing yards	101	318
Passing yards	161	285
Turnovers	3	0
Time of possession	32:03	27:57

Team	Category	Player	Statistics
New Mexico State	Passing	Josh Adkins	19/30, 145 yards, TD, INT
New Mexico State	Rushing	Josh Foley	7 rushes, 51 yards
New Mexico State	Receiving	Tony Nicholson	2 receptions, 44 yards
Alabama	Passing	Tua Tagovailoa	16/24, 227 yards, 3 TD
Alabama	Rushing	Keilan Robinson	5 rushes, 80 yards, TD
Alabama	Receiving	Jerry Jeudy	8 receptions, 103 yards, 3 TD

=== San Diego State ===
San Diego State at New Mexico State

Team	1	2	3	4	Total
• Aztecs	7	10	7	7	31
Aggies	0	0	10	0	10

- Date: September 14
- Location: Aggie Memorial Stadium
  Las Cruces, NM
- Game start: 6:07 p.m. MDT
- Elapsed time: 2 hours and 59 minutes
- Game attendance: 10,123
- Game weather: Cloudy • Temperature: 67 °F (19 °C) • Wind: NE 8 MPH
- Referee: Kevin Hassell
- TV announcers (FloSports/FSNAZ+): Adam Young and Danny Knee

Scoring summary
1	10:18	SDSU	Daniel Bellinger 2–yard pass from Ryan Agnew (Matt Araiza kick)	SDSU 7–0
2	09:55	SDSU	Jordan Byrd 1–yard run (Matt Araiza kick)	SDSU 14–0
2	00:01	SDSU	Matt Araiza 40–yard field goal	SDSU 17–0
3	08:43	SDSU	Jordan Byrd 7–yard run (Matt Araiza kick)	SDSU 24–0
3	04:55	NMSU	Robert Downs III 35–yard pass from Josh Adkins (Dylan Brown kick)	SDSU 24–7
3	00:23	NMSU	Dylan Brown 46–yard field goal	SDSU 24–10
4	11:11	SDSU	Chance Bell 18–yard run (Matt Araiza kick)	SDSU 31–10

Statistics	SDSU	NMSU
First downs	24	17
Total yards	397	329
Rushing yards	281	30
Passing yards	116	299
Turnovers	1	4
Time of possession	35:04	24:56

Team	Category	Player	Statistics
San Diego State	Passing	Ryan Agnew	17/26, 116 yards, TD, INT
San Diego State	Rushing	Jordan Byrd	22 rushes, 118 yards, 2 TD
San Diego State	Receiving	Elijah Kothe	4 receptions, 34 yards
New Mexico State	Passing	Josh Adkins	26/41, 299 yards, TD, 2 INT
New Mexico State	Rushing	Jason Huntley	8 rushes, 41 yards
New Mexico State	Receiving	Tony Nicholson	7 receptions, 78 yards

=== At New Mexico ===
New Mexico State at New Mexico

Team	1	2	3	4	Total
Aggies	17	14	7	14	52
• Lobos	14	17	17	7	55

- Date: September 21
- Location: Dreamstyle Stadium
  Albuquerque, NM
- Game start: 2:38 p.m. MDT
- Elapsed time: 3 hours and 25 minutes
- Game attendance: 27,269
- Game weather: Sunny • Temperature: 77 °F (25 °C)
- Referee: Eddy Shelton
- TV announcers (ATTSNRM): Brad Thompson, Sherdrick Bonner and Marc Stout (sideline)

Scoring summary
1	14:21	NM	Jerrick Reed II 43–yard interception (Andrew Shelley kick)	NM 7–0
1	11:15	NMSU	Josh Adkins 3–yard run (Dylan Brown kick)	TIE 7–7
1	04:36	NMSU	Jason Huntley 2–yard run (Dylan Brown kick)	NMSU 14–7
1	02:29	NM	Ahmari Davis 2–yard run (Andrew Shelley kick)	TIE 14–14
1	00:35	NMSU	Dylan Brown 33–yard field goal	NMSU 17–14
2	12:31	NM	Andrew Shelley 48–yard field goal	TIE 17–17
2	09:32	NMSU	Josh Adkins 1–yard run (Dylan Brown kick)	NMSU 24–17
2	07:26	NM	Jordan Kress 55–yard pass from Tevaka Tuioti (Andrew Shelley kick)	TIE 24–24
2	01:07	NM	Ahmari Davis 1–yard run (Andrew Shelley kick)	NM 31–24
2	00:02	NMSU	Tony Nicholson 11–yard pass from Josh Adkins (Dylan Brown kick)	TIE 31–31
3	11:25	NM	Andrew Shelley 49–yard field goal	NM 34–31
3	08:15	NMSU	Tony Nicholson 3–yard pass from Josh Adkins (Dylan Brown kick)	NMSU 38–34
3	03:45	NM	Jordan Kress 20–yard pass from Tevaka Tuioti (Andrew Shelley kick)	NM 41–38
3	01:02	NM	Cedric Patterson III 62–yard pass from Tevaka Tuioti (Andrew Shelley kick)	NM 48–38
4	10:26	NM	Daevon Vigilant 1–yard run (Andrew Shelley kick)	NM 55–38
4	07:37	NMSU	Jason Huntley 4–yard pass from Josh Adkins (Dylan Brown kick)	NM 55–45
4	05:22	NMSU	Josh Adkins 4–yard run (Dylan Brown kick)	NM 55–52

Statistics	NMSU	UNM
First downs	29	27
Total yards	489	598
Rushing yards	154	243
Passing yards	335	355
Turnovers	1	1
Time of possession	26:54	33:06

Team	Category	Player	Statistics
New Mexico State	Passing	Josh Adkins	30/47, 335 yards, 3 TD, INT
New Mexico State	Rushing	Jason Huntley	12 rushes, 114 yards, TD
New Mexico State	Receiving	Naveon Mitchell	4 receptions, 105 yards
New Mexico	Passing	Tevaka Tuioti	16/28, 355 yards, 3 TD, INT
New Mexico	Rushing	Ahmari Davis	28 rushes, 133 yards, 2 TD
New Mexico	Receiving	Jordan Kress	3 receptions, 122 yards, 2 TD

=== Fresno State ===
Fresno State at New Mexico State

Team	1	2	3	4	Total
• Bulldogs	7	17	6	0	30
Aggies	0	3	7	7	17

- Date: September 28
- Location: Aggie Memorial Stadium
  Las Cruces, NM
- Game start: 6:07 p.m. MDT
- Elapsed time: 3 hours and 3 minutes
- Game attendance: 8,872
- Game weather: Sunny and clear • Temperature: 85 °F (29 °C) • Wind: SW 10 MPH
- Referee: Cooper Castleberry
- TV announcers (FloSports/FSNAZ+): Adam Young and Danny Knee

Scoring summary
1	09:08	FRES	Josh Hokit 8–yard run (Cesar Silva kick)	FRES 7–0
2	11:28	FRES	Jalen Cropper 79–yard run (Cesar Silva kick)	FRES 10–0
2	02:56	FRES	Cesar Silva 28–yard field goal	FRES 17–0
2	01:00	FRES	Wylan Free 91–yard interception (Cesar Silva kick)	FRES 24–0
2	00:00	NMSU	Dylan Brown 42–yard field goal	FRES 24–3
3	12:58	NMSU	Jason Huntley 2–yard run (Dylan Brown kick)	FRES 24–10
3	06:58	FRES	Cesar Silva 38–yard field goal	FRES 27–10
3	04:22	FRES	Cesar Silva 24–yard field goal	FRES 30–10
4	09:25	NMSU	Tony Nicholson 16–yard pass from Josh Adkins (Dylan Brown kick)	FRES 30–17

Statistics	FRES	NMSU
First downs	18	17
Total yards	386	315
Rushing yards	239	105
Passing yards	147	210
Turnovers	1	3
Time of possession	36:01	23:59

Team	Category	Player	Statistics
Fresno State	Passing	Jorge Reyna	20/31, 147 yards
Fresno State	Rushing	Jalen Cropper	5 rushes, 118 yards, TD
Fresno State	Receiving	Emoryie Edwards	8 receptions, 70 yards
New Mexico State	Passing	Josh Adkins	26/46, 210 yards, TD, 3 INT
New Mexico State	Rushing	Jason Huntley	9 rushes, 82 yards, TD
New Mexico State	Receiving	Tony Nicholson	6 receptions, 81 yards, TD

=== Liberty ===
Liberty at New Mexico State

Team	1	2	3	4	Total
• Flames	3	7	3	7	20
Aggies	0	0	6	7	13

- Date: October 5
- Location: Aggie Memorial Stadium
  Las Cruces, NM
- Game start: 6:07 p.m. MDT
- Elapsed time: 3 hours and 9 minutes
- Game attendance: 23,140
- Game weather: Sunny and clear • Temperature: 82 °F (28 °C) • Wind: WSW 8 MPH
- Referee: Reggie Smith
- TV announcers (FloSports/FSNAZ+): Adam Young and Danny Knee

Scoring summary
1	02:59	LIB	Alex Probert 25–yard field goal	LIB 3–0
2	00:22	LIB	Zac Foutz 2–yard pass from Stephen Calvert (Alex Probert kick)	LIB 10–0
3	12:15	NMSU	Dylan Brown 33–yard field goal	LIB 10–3
3	08:08	LIB	Alex Probert 51–yard field goal	LIB 13–3
3	02:45	NMSU	Dylan Brown 39–yard field goal	LIB 13–6
3	07:46	NMSU	Jason Huntley 12–yard run (Dylan Brown kick)	TIED 13–13
4	06:19	LIB	Joshua Mack 4–yard run (Alex Probert kick)	LIB 20–13

Statistics	LIB	NMSU
First downs	20	24
Total yards	334	396
Rushing yards	161	131
Passing yards	173	265
Turnovers	0	3
Time of possession	31:21	28:39

Team	Category	Player	Statistics
Liberty	Passing	Stephen Calvert	16/31, 173 yards, TD
Liberty	Rushing	Joshua Mack	16 rushes, 113 yards, TD
Liberty	Receiving	Joshua Mack	2 receptions, 64 yards
New Mexico State	Passing	Josh Adkins	20/30, 265 yards, 2 INT
New Mexico State	Rushing	Jason Huntley	16 rushes, 75 yards, TD
New Mexico State	Receiving	O. J. Clark	5 receptions, 76 yards

=== At Central Michigan ===
New Mexico State at Central Michigan

Team	1	2	3	4	Total
Aggies	7	14	0	7	28
• Chippewas	14	14	6	8	42

- Date: October 12
- Location: Kelly/Shorts Stadium
  Mount Pleasant, MI
- Game start: 3:00 p.m. EDT
- Elapsed time: 3 hours and 23 minutes
- Game attendance: 15,764
- Game weather: Partly cloudy • Temperature: 46 °F (8 °C) • Wind: E 16 MPH
- Referee: Timothy O'Dey
- TV announcers (ESPN3): Shawn Kenney and Marcus Ray

Scoring summary
1	08:51	CMU	Kalil Pimpleton 44–yard pass from Quinten Dormady (Ryan Tice kick)	CMU 7–0
1	07:09	CMU	Kobe Lewis 57–yard run (Ryan Tice kick)	CMU 14–0
1	02:37	NMSU	Naveon Mitchell 4–yard pass from Josh Adkins (Dylan Brown kick)	CMU 14–7
2	07:23	CMU	Kobe Lewis 20–yard run (Ryan Tice kick)	CMU 21–7
2	04:17	NMSU	O.J. Clark 11–yard pass from Josh Adkins (Dylan Brown kick)	CMU 21–14
2	03:57	CMU	Jonathan Ward 75–yard run (Ryan Tice kick)	CMU 28–14
2	00:50	NMSU	Jason Huntley 37–yard run (Dylan Brown kick)	CMU 28–21
3	08:54	CMU	Ryan Tice 35–yard field goal	CMU 31–21
3	00:00	CMU	Ryan Tice 43–yard field goal	CMU 34–21
4	07:48	CMU	Tony Poljan 7–yard pass from Quinten Dormady (Kalil Pimpleton pass)	CMU 42–21
4	06:21	NMSU	Jared Wyatt 34–yard pass from Josh Adkins (Dylan Brown kick)	CMU 42–28

Statistics	NMSU	CMU
First downs	18	22
Total yards	384	486
Rushing yards	121	352
Passing yards	263	134
Turnovers	2	1
Time of possession	24:59	35:01

Team	Category	Player	Statistics
New Mexico State	Passing	Josh Adkins	24/40, 263 yards, 3 TD, INT
New Mexico State	Rushing	Jason Huntley	10 rushes, 67 yards, TD
New Mexico State	Receiving	Tony Nicholson	7 receptions, 86 yards
Central Michigan	Passing	Quinten Dormady	14/24, 134 yards, 2 TD
Central Michigan	Rushing	Kobe Lewis	23 rushes, 161 yards, 2 TD
Central Michigan	Receiving	Kalil Pimpleton	6 receptions, 59 yards, TD

=== At Georgia Southern ===
New Mexico State at Georgia Southern

Team	1	2	3	4	Total
Aggies	7	0	0	0	7
• Eagles	7	21	13	0	41

- Date: October 26
- Location: Paulson Stadium
  Statesboro, GA
- Game start: 3:05 p.m. EDT
- Elapsed time: 2 hours and 40 minutes
- Game attendance: 10,907
- Game weather: Cloudy and humid • Temperature: 80 °F (27 °C) • Wind: SE 6 MPH
- Referee: Kyle Olson
- TV announcers (ESPN3): Greg Talbott, Danny Waugh and Amy Zimmer

Scoring summary
1	08:48	NMSU	Jason Huntley 3–yard run (Dylan Brown kick)	NMSU 7–0
1	07:49	GASO	Wesley Kennedy III 71–yard run (Tyler Bass kick)	TIED 7–7
2	13:54	GASO	J.D. King 2–yard run (Tyler Bass kick)	GASO 14–7
2	09:56	GASO	Wesley Kennedy III 47–yard run (Tyler Bass kick)	GASO 21–7
2	05:19	GASO	J.D. King 1–yard run (Tyler Bass kick)	GASO 28–7
3	13:34	GASO	Wesley Kennedy III 67–yard punt return (run failed)	GASO 34–7
3	04:42	GASO	Rashad Byrd 7–yard interception (Tyler Bass kick)	GASO 41–7

Statistics	NMSU	GASO
First downs	15	17
Total yards	268	406
Rushing yards	209	403
Passing yards	59	3
Turnovers	3	3
Time of possession	29:10	30:50

Team	Category	Player	Statistics
New Mexico State	Passing	Josh Adkins	13/23, 59 yards, 2 INT
New Mexico State	Rushing	Jason Huntley	24 rushes, 133 yards, TD
New Mexico State	Receiving	Jason Huntley	4 receptions, 11 yards
Georgia Southern	Passing	Shai Werts	2/4, 3 yards
Georgia Southern	Rushing	Wesley Kennedy III	6 rushes, 143 yards, 2 TD
Georgia Southern	Receiving	Wesley Kennedy III	1 reception, 9 yards

=== At Ole Miss ===
New Mexico State at Ole Miss

Team	1	2	3	4	Total
Aggies	0	3	0	0	3
• Rebels	10	14	7	10	41

- Date: November 9
- Location: Vaught–Hemingway Stadium
  Oxford, MS
- Game start: 3:01 p.m. CST
- Elapsed time: 2 hours and 48 minutes
- Game attendance: 45,973
- Game weather: Clear and sunny • Temperature: 56 °F (13 °C) • Wind: NE 4 MPH
- Referee: Hubert Owens
- TV announcers (SECN): Dave Neal, D. J. Shockley and Dawn Davenport

Scoring summary
1	12:36	MISS	Luke Logan 36–yard field goal	MISS 3–0
1	05:39	MISS	Jarod Conner 30–yard run (Luke Logan kick)	MISS 10–0
2	11:57	MISS	Jerrion Ealy 5–yard run (Luke Logan kick)	MISS 17–0
2	05:46	NMSU	Dylan Brown 34–yard field goal	MISS 17–3
2	00:40	MISS	John Rhys Plumlee 2–yard run (Luke Logan kick)	MISS 24–3
3	05:29	MISS	John Rhys Plumlee 18–yard run (Luke Logan kick)	MISS 31–3
4	13:38	MISS	Jarod Conner 1–yard run (Isaac Way kick)	MISS 38–3
4	05:38	MISS	Luke Logan 28–yard field goal	MISS 41–3

Statistics	NMSU	MISS
First downs	12	32
Total yards	193	606
Rushing yards	66	447
Passing yards	127	159
Turnovers	0	1
Time of possession	25:23	34:37

Team	Category	Player	Statistics
New Mexico State	Passing	Josh Adkins	25/35, 127 yards
New Mexico State	Rushing	Jason Huntley	7 rushes, 45 yards
New Mexico State	Receiving	Tony Nicholson	6 receptions, 37 yards
Ole Miss	Passing	John Rhys Plumlee	11/17, 124 yards
Ole Miss	Rushing	John Rhys Plumlee	12 rushes, 177 yards, 2 TD
Ole Miss	Receiving	Elijah Moore	3 receptions, 37 yards

=== Incarnate Word ===
Incarnate Ward at New Mexico State

Team	1	2	3	4	Total
Cardinals	0	7	7	14	28
• Aggies	14	10	3	14	41

- Date: November 16
- Location: Aggie Memorial Stadium
  Las Cruces, NM
- Game start: 2:07 p.m. MST
- Elapsed time: 3 hours and 45 minutes
- Game attendance: 25,084
- Game weather: N/A
- Referee: Scott Campbell
- TV announcers (FloSports/FSNAZ+): Adam Young and Danny Knee

Scoring summary
1	04:38	NMSU	Tony Nicholson 34–yard pass from Josh Adkins (Dylan Brown kick)	NMSU 7–0
1	01:23	NMSU	Tony Nicholson 42–yard pass from Josh Adkins (Dylan Brown kick)	NMSU 14–0
2	14:42	NMSU	O.J. Clark 77–yard punt return (Dylan Brown kick)	NMSU 21–0
2	09:31	UIW	Keyondrick Philio 1–yard run (Carson Mohr kick)	NMSU 21–7
2	04:00	NMSU	Dylan Brown 30–yard field goal	NMSU 24–7
3	04:46	NMSU	Dylan Brown 28–yard field goal	NMSU 27–7
3	00:24	UIW	Ameer King 11–yard pass from Jon Copeland (Carson Mohr kick)	NMSU 27–14
4	13:53	NMSU	Jason Huntley 1–yard run (Dylan Brown kick)	NMSU 34–14
4	13:41	UIW	Ce'Cori Tolds 100–yard run kickoff return (Carson Mohr kick)	NMSU 34–21
4	03:49	NMSU	Christian Gibson 2–yard run (Dylan Brown kick)	NMSU 41–21
4	00:57	UIW	Jon Copeland 1–yard run (Carson Mohr kick)	NMSU 41–28

Statistics	UIW	NMSU
First downs	20	28
Total yards	282	611
Rushing yards	39	295
Passing yards	243	316
Turnovers	2	3
Time of possession	24:51	35:09

Team	Category	Player	Statistics
Incarnate Word	Passing	Jon Copeland	18/40, 181 yards, TD, 2 INT
Incarnate Word	Rushing	Kevin Brown	9 rushes, 31 yards
Incarnate Word	Receiving	Mark Sullivan	3 receptions, 48 yards
New Mexico State	Passing	Josh Adkins	28/38, 316 yards, 2 TD
New Mexico State	Rushing	Jason Huntley	25 rushes, 174 yards, TD
New Mexico State	Receiving	Tony Nicholson	6 receptions, 101 yards, 2 TD

=== UTEP ===
UTEP at New Mexico State
(Battle of I-10)

Team	1	2	3	4	Total
Miners	0	13	3	19	35
• Aggies	7	7	7	23	44

- Date: November 23
- Location: Aggie Memorial Stadium
  Las Cruces, NM
- Game start: 2:07 p.m. MST
- Elapsed time: 3 hours and 23 minutes
- Game attendance: 21,584
- Game weather: Clear • Temperature: 57 °F (14 °C) • Wind: NNW 4 MPH
- Referee: Ken Antee
- TV announcers (FloSports/FSNAZ+): Adam Young and Danny Knee

Scoring summary
1	09:00	NMSU	Jason Huntley 39–yard run (Dylan Brown kick)	NMSU 7–0
2	12:36	UTEP	Treyvon Hughes 11–yard run (Gavin Baechle kick)	TIE 7–7
2	04:36	UTEP	Gavin Baechle 34–yard field goal	UTEP 10–7
2	01:29	UTEP	Gavin Baechle 21–yard field goal	UTEP 13–7
2	00:55	NMSU	Jason Huntley 53–yard run (Dylan Brown kick)	NMSU 14–13
3	04:01	UTEP	Gavin Baechle 42–yard field goal	UTEP 16–14
3	02:00	NMSU	Jason Huntley 7–yard run (Dylan Brown kick)	NMSU 21–16
4	14:55	UTEP	Jacob Cowing 23–yard pass from Kai Locksley (pass failed)	UTEP 22–21
4	11:57	NMSU	Josh Adkins 7–yard pass from Tony Nicholson (Josh Adkins pass failed)	NMSU 27–22
4	06:20	NMSU	Dylan Brown 53–yard field goal	NMSU 30–22
4	05:30	NMSU	Matthew Young 19–yard fumble recovery (Dylan Brown kick)	NMSU 37–22
4	04:27	UTEP	Kai Locksley 1–yard run (Gavin Baechle kick)	NMSU 37–29
4	02:39	NMSU	Christian Gibson 53–yard run (Dylan Brown kick)	NMSU 44–29
4	00:00	UTEP	Justin Garrett 10–yard pass from Kai Locksley	NMSU 44–35

Statistics	UTEP	NMSU
First downs	27	17
Total yards	557	441
Rushing yards	199	259
Passing yards	358	182
Turnovers	2	0
Time of possession	37:14	22:46

Team	Category	Player	Statistics
UTEP	Passing	Kai Locksley	24/38, 358 yards, 2 TD, INT
UTEP	Rushing	Kai Locksley	18 rushes, 103 yards, TD
UTEP	Receiving	Justin Garrett	5 receptions, 119 yards, TD
New Mexico State	Passing	Josh Adkins	18/30, 175 yards
New Mexico State	Rushing	Jason Huntley	14 rushes, 191 yards, 3 TD
New Mexico State	Receiving	O. J. Clark	9 receptions, 72 yards

=== At Liberty ===
New Mexico State at Liberty

Team	1	2	3	4	Total
Aggies	7	7	7	7	28
• Flames	10	10	15	14	49

- Date: November 30
- Location: Williams Stadium
  Lynchburg, VA
- Game start: 2:06 p.m. EST
- Elapsed time: 3 hours and 26 minutes
- Game attendance: 18,674
- Game weather: Rain • Temperature: 42 °F (6 °C) • Wind: E 2 MPH
- Referee: Larry Saunders
- TV announcers (ESPN+): Matt Warner, Joe Jauch and Melanie Newman

Scoring summary
1	11:55	LIB	Noah Frith 5–yard pass from Stephen Calvert (Alex Probert kick)	LIBERTY 7–0
1	06:44	NMSU	Christian Gibson 1–yard run (Dylan Brown kick)	TIE 7–7
1	03:18	LIB	Alex Probert 46–yard field goal	LIB 10–7
2	14:17	LIB	Alex Probert 24–yard field goal	LIB 13–7
2	08:37	LIB	Frankie Hickson 7–yard run (Alex Probert kick)	LIB 20–7
2	04:26	NMSU	Andre Bodison 1–yard pass from Josh Adkins (Dylan Brown kick)	LIB 20–14
3	12:05	LIB	Frankie Hickson 2–yard run (Alex Probert kick failed)	LIB 26–14
3	08:06	LIB	Alex Probert 21–yard field goal	LIB 29–14
3	05:27	NMSU	Robert Downs III 27–yard pass from Josh Adkins (Dylan Brown kick)	LIB 29–21
3	00:35	LIB	Joshua Mack 2–yard run (run failed)	LIB 35–21
4	14:25	LIB	Frankie Hickson 9–yard run (Alex Probert kick)	LIB 42–21
4	05:46	LIB	Frankie Hickson 9–yard run (Alex Probert kick)	LIB 49–21
4	01:00	NMSU	Tony Nicholson 3–yard pass from Josh Adkins (Dylan Brown kick)	LIB 49–28

Statistics	NMSU	LIB
First downs	19	25
Total yards	328	486
Rushing yards	155	317
Passing yards	173	169
Turnovers	2	0
Time of possession	26:59	33:01

Team	Category	Player	Statistics
New Mexico State	Passing	Josh Adkins	18/35, 173 yards, 3 TD, INT
New Mexico State	Rushing	Jason Huntley	17 rushes, 105 yards
New Mexico State	Receiving	Robert Downs III	3 receptions, 66 yards, TD
Liberty	Passing	Stephen Calvert	16/29, 169 yards, TD
Liberty	Rushing	Frankie Hickson	29 rushes, 196 yards, 4 TD
Liberty	Receiving	C. J. Yarbrough	2 receptions, 41 yards

== Players drafted into the NFL ==
Round	Pick	Player	Position	NFL Club
5	172	Jason Huntley	RB	Detroit Lions
