= 2019 Cure Bowl =

Postseason college football bowl game

2019 FBC Mortgage Cure Bowl
- 5th Cure Bowl
Liberty Flames	Georgia Southern Eagles
(7–5)	(7–5)
Independent	Sun Belt
23	16
Head coach: Hugh Freeze	Head coach: Chad Lunsford
	1	2	3	4	Total
Liberty	7	9	7	0	23
Georgia Southern	0	7	6	3	16
- Date: December 21, 2019
- Season: 2019
- Stadium: Exploria Stadium
- Location: Orlando, Florida
- MVP: Jessie Lemonier (DE, Liberty)
- Favorite: Georgia Southern by 4.5
- Referee: Kevin Hassell (Mountain West)
- Attendance: 18,158
- Payout: US$573,125

United States TV coverage
- Network: CBS Sports Network
- Announcers: Carter Blackburn (play-by-play), Aaron Taylor (analyst), John Schriffen (sideline)

The 2019 Cure Bowl was a college football bowl game played on December 21, 2019, in Orlando, Florida, with kickoff at 2:30 p.m. EST on CBS Sports Network. It was the fifth edition of the Cure Bowl, and one of the 2019–20 bowl games concluding the 2019 FBS football season. This was first Cure Bowl played at Exploria Stadium, as all prior editions were held at nearby Camping World Stadium. With FBC Mortgage as the title sponsor, the game was officially known as the FBC Mortgage Cure Bowl. Liberty defeated Georgia Southern 23–16, to claim their first bowl win in program history.

== Teams ==
The game was played between the Liberty Flames and the Georgia Southern Eagles. Georgia Southern held a 3–0 record against Liberty in prior meetings.

=== Liberty Flames ===
Liberty finished their regular season with a 7–5 record while competing as an independent. This was the Flames' first bowl game since joining the Football Bowl Subdivision, accomplished in their first season of being eligible to qualify for a bowl game.

=== Georgia Southern Eagles ===
Georgia Southern finished their regular season with a 7–5 record (5–3 in conference), in second place of the East Division of the Sun Belt Conference. This was the Eagles' third bowl game since moving to the Football Bowl Subdivision in 2014; they had an undefeated record of 2–0 in prior bowls. Their 2018 team won that season's Camellia Bowl over Eastern Michigan, 23–21.

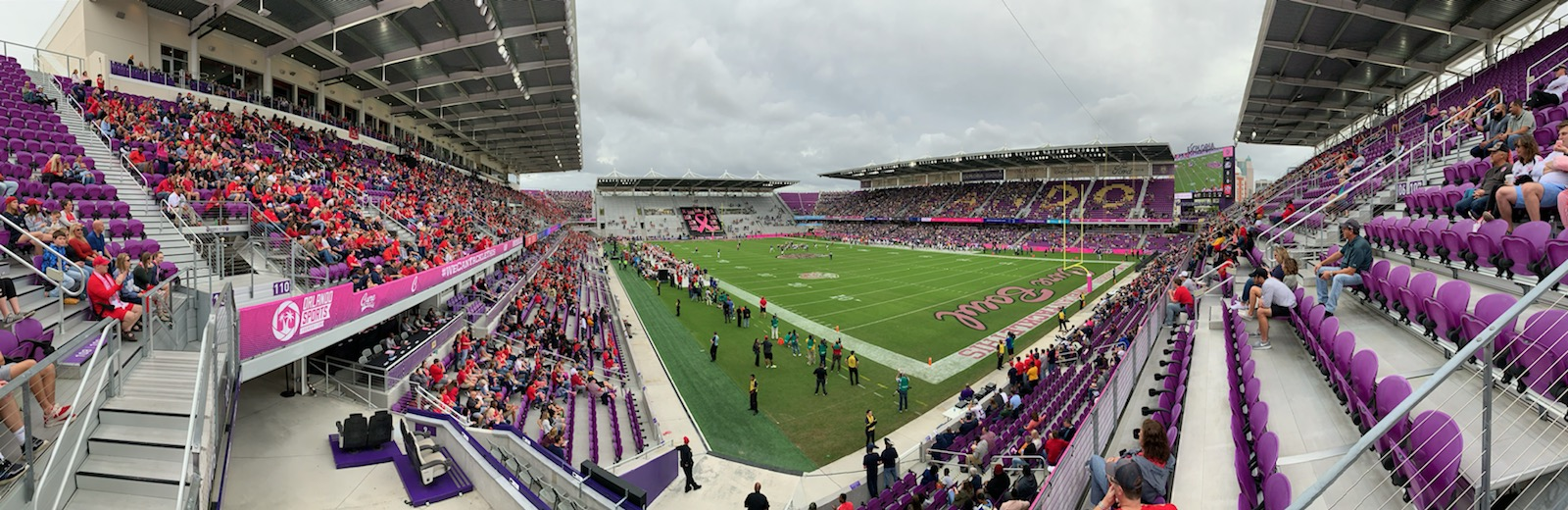
The first American football game at Exploria Stadium

== Game summary ==
2019 Cure Bowl

Quarter	1	2	3	4	Total
Liberty	7	9	7	0	23
Georgia Southern	0	7	6	3	16

at Exploria Stadium • Orlando, Florida

- Date: Saturday, December 21, 2019
- Game time: 2:30 p.m. EST
- Game weather: Cloudy • Temperature: 72 °F (22 °C) • Wind: E 12 mph
- Game attendance: 18,158
- Referee: Kevin Hassell
- TV announcers (CBS Sports Network): Carter Blackburn (play-by-play), Aaron Taylor (analyst) and John Schriffen (sideline)
- ESPN game summary

Game information

First Quarter

- (3:31) LIB – Stephen Calvert 57 yard pass to Johnny Huntley, Alex Probert kick (Drive: 6 plays, 88 yards, 1:48; Liberty 7–0)

Second Quarter

- (14:53) GASO – Wesley Kennedy III 10 yard rush, Tyler Bass kick (Drive: 7 plays, 79 yards. 3:38; Tied 7–7)
- (13:22) LIB – Joshua Mack 3 yard rush, kick failed (Drive: 6 plays, 75 yards, 1:31; Liberty 13–7)
- (1:02) LIB – Alex Probert 46 yard field goal (Drive: 5 plays, 32 yards, 0:34; Liberty 16–7)

Third Quarter

- (12:01) LIB – Stephen Calvert 14 yard pass to Antonio Gandy-Golden, Alex Probert kick (Drive: 6 plays, 75 yards, 2:59; Liberty 23–7)
- (6:20) GASO – Tyler Bass 28 yard field goal (Drive: 6 plays, 19 yards, 3:29; Liberty 23–10)
- (2:49) GASO – Tyler Bass 30 yard field goal (Drive: 5 plays, 64 yards, 2:28; Liberty 23–13)

Fourth Quarter

- (1:44) GASO – Tyler Bass 35 yard field goal (Drive: 13 plays, 55 yards, 4:51; Liberty 23–16)

=== Statistics ===
Statistics	LIB	GASO
First downs	19	14
Total yards	402	289
Rushes–yards	37–132	46–194
Passing yards	270	95
Passing: Comp–Att–Int	16–35–2	10–19–1
Time of possession	31:18	28:42

Team	Category	Player	Statistics
Liberty	Passing	Stephen Calvert	16/35, 270 yards, 2 TD, 2 INT
Liberty	Rushing	Frankie Hickson	22 carries, 120 yards
Liberty	Receiving	Johnny Huntley	2 receptions, 90 yards
Georgia Southern	Passing	Shai Werts	10/19, 95 yards, 1 TD
Georgia Southern	Rushing	Wesley Kennedy III	9 receptions, 104 yards, 1 TD
Georgia Southern	Receiving	Mark Michaud	2 receptions, 53 yards
