= Chris Summers =

Chris Summers may refer to:

- Chris Summers (drummer) (born 1970), Norwegian musician
- Chris Summers (footballer) (born 1972), Welsh footballer
- Chris Summers (ice hockey) (born 1988), hockey player
- Chris Summers (kicker) (born 1988), American football placekicker and punter
- Chris Summers (wide receiver) (born 1989), American football wide receiver
- Christopher Summers or Corsair, a Marvel Comics character
