= 2019 UMass Minutemen football team =

American college football season

2019 UMass Minutemen football
- Conference: Independent
- Record: 1–11
- Head coach: Walt Bell (1st season)
- Offensive scheme: Spread
- Co-defensive coordinators: Aazaar Abdul-Rahim (1st season); Tommy Restivo (1st season)
- Base defense: 4–2–5
- Home stadium: Warren McGuirk Alumni Stadium

2019 NCAA Division I FBS independents football records
	Conf.			Overall
Team	W		L	W		L
No. 12 Notre Dame		–		11	–	2
Liberty		–		8	–	5
BYU		–		7	–	6
Army		–		5	–	8
New Mexico State		–		2	–	10
UMass		–		1	–	11
Rankings from AP Poll

The 2019 UMass Minutemen football team represented the University of Massachusetts Amherst in the 2019 NCAA Division I FBS football season. They were led by first-year head coach Walt Bell and played their home games at Warren McGuirk Alumni Stadium. This was the fourth year for the Minutemen as an independent; they finished the season at 1–11 and were outscored by their opponents by a combined total of 632 to 237. CBS Sports rated UMass 129th in their ranking of all 130 FBS teams; Akron, the only team that the Minutemen defeated, was ranked last.

== Schedule ==
Date	Time	Opponent	Site	TV	Result	Attendance
August 30	7:15 p.m.	at Rutgers	SHI Stadium; Piscataway, NJ	BTN	L 21–48	40,515
September 7	3:30 p.m.	Southern Illinois	Warren McGuirk Alumni Stadium; Hadley, MA	NESNPlus/FloSports	L 20–45	10,524
September 14	6:00 p.m.	at Charlotte	Jerry Richardson Stadium; Charlotte, NC	ESPN3	L 17–52	12,812
September 21	1:00 p.m.	Coastal Carolina	Warren McGuirk Alumni Stadium; Hadley, MA	NESN/FloSports	L 28–62	8,557
September 28	3:30 p.m.	Akron	Warren McGuirk Alumni Stadium; Hadley, MA	FloSports	W 37–29	7,284
October 5	7:00 p.m.	at FIU	Riccardo Silva Stadium; Miami, FL	ESPN3	L 0–44	12,746
October 12	7:00 p.m.	at Louisiana Tech	Joe Aillet Stadium; Ruston, LA	ESPN3	L 21–69	19,682
October 26	3:30 p.m.	UConn^{†}	Warren McGuirk Alumni Stadium; Hadley, MA (rivalry)	NESN/NESNPlus/FloSports	L 35–56	12,234
November 2	12:00 p.m.	Liberty	Warren McGuirk Alumni Stadium; Hadley, MA	NESN/FloSports	L 21–63	10,184
November 9	12:00 p.m.	at Army	Michie Stadium; West Point, NY	CBSSN	L 7–63	35,567
November 16	12:00 p.m.	at Northwestern	Ryan Field; Evanston, IL	BTN	L 6–45	29,447
November 23	12:00 p.m.	BYU	Warren McGuirk Alumni Stadium; Hadley, MA	NESN/FloSports	L 24–56	8,204
^{†}Homecoming; All times are in Eastern time

Schedule source:

== Game summaries ==
=== At Rutgers ===
	1	2	3	4	Total
Minutemen	21	0	0	0	21
Scarlet Knights	7	31	3	7	48

Statistics	MASS	RUTG
First downs	19	24
Total yards	304	554
Rushing yards	183	206
Passing yards	121	348
Turnovers	2	3
Time of possession	23:54	36:06

Team	Category	Player	Statistics
UMass	Passing	Randall West	20/31, 106 yards, TD, INT
UMass	Rushing	Bilal Ally	11 rushes, 68 yards, TD
UMass	Receiving	Kyle Horn	4 receptions, 37 yards, TD
Rutgers	Passing	McLane Carter	21/31, 340 yards, 2 TD, 3 INT
Rutgers	Rushing	Isiah Pacheco	20 rushes, 156 yards, 4 TD
Rutgers	Receiving	Bo Melton	6 receptions, 127 yards, TD

=== Southern Illinois ===
	1	2	3	4	Total
Salukis	0	17	14	14	45
Minutemen	6	7	0	7	20

Statistics	SIU	MASS
First downs	21	15
Total yards	502	321
Rushing yards	237	123
Passing yards	265	198
Turnovers	1	2
Time of possession	32:55	27:05

Team	Category	Player	Statistics
Southern Illinois	Passing	Stone Labanowitz	19/26, 265 yards, 4 TD
Southern Illinois	Rushing	D. J. Davis	21 rushes, 85 yards
Southern Illinois	Receiving	Javon Williams Jr.	3 receptions, 103 yards, TD
UMass	Passing	Randall West	9/17, 125 yards, INT
UMass	Rushing	Bilal Ally	16 rushes, 87 yards
UMass	Receiving	Zak Simon	3 receptions, 60 yards

=== At Charlotte ===
	1	2	3	4	Total
Minutemen	0	10	0	7	17
49ers	21	10	14	7	52

Statistics	MASS	CLT
First downs	15	22
Total yards	262	533
Rushing yards	135	338
Passing yards	127	195
Turnovers	1	0
Time of possession	27:46	32:14

Team	Category	Player	Statistics
UMass	Passing	Andrew Brito	18/27, 127 yards, TD, INT
UMass	Rushing	Cam Roberson	10 rushes, 73 yards
UMass	Receiving	Jermaine Johnson	5 receptions, 38 yards, TD
Charlotte	Passing	Chris Reynolds	10/12, 155 yards, 2 TD
Charlotte	Rushing	Benny LeMay	16 rushes, 113 yards
Charlotte	Receiving	Tyler Ringwood	2 receptions, 46 yards, 2 TD

=== Coastal Carolina ===
	1	2	3	4	Total
Chanticleers	14	28	14	6	62
Minutemen	7	7	7	7	28

Statistics	CCU	MASS
First downs	35	20
Total yards	636	329
Rushing yards	334	109
Passing yards	302	220
Turnovers	1	1
Time of possession	34:43	25:17

Team	Category	Player	Statistics
Coastal Carolina	Passing	Fred Payton	16/18, 203 yards, TD, INT
Coastal Carolina	Rushing	Bryce Carpenter	12 rushes, 102 yards
Coastal Carolina	Receiving	Jeremiah Miller	4 receptions, 62 yards
UMass	Passing	Randall West	8/11, 120 yards, 2 TD
UMass	Rushing	Bilal Ally	11 rushes, 42 yards, 2 TD
UMass	Receiving	Zak Simon	5 receptions, 74 yards, TD

=== Akron ===
	1	2	3	4	Total
Zips	7	7	7	8	29
Minutemen	7	13	14	3	37

Statistics	AKR	MASS
First downs	22	24
Total yards	406	433
Rushing yards	71	220
Passing yards	335	213
Turnovers	3	1
Time of possession	29:02	30:58

Team	Category	Player	Statistics
Akron	Passing	Zach Gibson	12/16, 173 yards, TD
Akron	Rushing	Michiah Burton	8 rushes, 25 yards, TD
Akron	Receiving	Boogie Knight	5 receptions, 100 yards
UMass	Passing	Michael Curtis	17/31, 173 yards, 2 TD, INT
UMass	Rushing	Bilal Ally	15 rushes, 97 yards
UMass	Receiving	Samuel Emilus	6 receptions, 70 yards, TD

This would be the Minutemen's last win until Week 6 in 2021.

=== At FIU ===
	1	2	3	4	Total
Minutemen	0	0	0	0	0
Panthers	17	17	10	0	44

Statistics	MASS	FIU
First downs	5	26
Total yards	115	541
Rushing yards	38	278
Passing yards	77	263
Turnovers	3	1
Time of possession	19:14	40:46

Team	Category	Player	Statistics
UMass	Passing	Michael Curtis	5/19, 66 yards, 2 INT
UMass	Rushing	Bilal Ally	9 rushes, 24 yards
UMass	Receiving	Jermaine Johnson	3 receptions, 33 yards
FIU	Passing	James Morgan	19/31, 263 yards, 2 TD
FIU	Rushing	Anthony Jones	20 rushes, 115 yards, TD
FIU	Receiving	Tony Gaiter IV	7 receptions, 103 yards, TD

=== At Louisiana Tech ===
	1	2	3	4	Total
Minutemen	0	14	7	0	21
Bulldogs	28	24	10	7	69

Statistics	MASS	LT
First downs	19	28
Total yards	347	689
Rushing yards	126	385
Passing yards	221	304
Turnovers	2	3
Time of possession	29:33	30:27

Team	Category	Player	Statistics
UMass	Passing	Randall West	17/29, 172 yards, TD, INT
UMass	Rushing	Bilal Ally	10 rushes, 92 yards, TD
UMass	Receiving	Zak Simon	4 receptions, 43 yards
Louisiana Tech	Passing	J'Mar Smith	16/28, 239 yards, 3 TD
Louisiana Tech	Rushing	Justin Henderson	11 rushes, 137 yards, 3 TD
Louisiana Tech	Receiving	Cee Jay Powell	4 receptions, 70 yards, TD

=== UConn ===
	1	2	3	4	Total
Huskies	14	21	7	14	56
Minutemen	7	14	7	7	35

Statistics	CONN	MASS
First downs	25	24
Total yards	539	439
Rushing yards	326	200
Passing yards	213	239
Turnovers	1	3
Time of possession	34:58	25:02

Team	Category	Player	Statistics
UConn	Passing	Jack Zergiotis	18/27, 198 yards, TD, INT
UConn	Rushing	Kevin Mensah	19 rushes, 164 yards, 5 TD
UConn	Receiving	Cam Ross	9 receptions, 120 yards, TD
UMass	Passing	Andrew Brito	20/40, 239 yards, 2 TD, INT
UMass	Rushing	Bilal Ally	25 rushes, 159 yards, 2 TD
UMass	Receiving	Jermaine Johnson	4 receptions, 92 yards, TD

=== Liberty ===
	1	2	3	4	Total
Flames	28	21	14	0	63
Minutemen	7	7	7	0	21

Statistics	LIB	MASS
First downs	31	10
Total yards	730	240
Rushing yards	242	106
Passing yards	488	134
Turnovers	3	0
Time of possession	31:49	28:11

Team	Category	Player	Statistics
Liberty	Passing	Stephen Calvert	20/27, 474 yards, 4 TD
Liberty	Rushing	Frankie Hickson	14 rushes, 99 yards, 3 TD
Liberty	Receiving	Antonio Gandy-Golden	6 receptions, 137 yards, TD
UMass	Passing	Andrew Brito	16/27, 134 yards, 2 TD
UMass	Rushing	Cam Roberson	15 rushes, 73 yards, TD
UMass	Receiving	Sadiq Palmer	4 receptions, 55 yards, TD

=== At Army ===
	1	2	3	4	Total
Minutemen	7	0	0	0	7
Black Knights	14	21	14	14	63

Statistics	MASS	ARMY
First downs	7	34
Total yards	125	546
Rushing yards	26	498
Passing yards	99	48
Turnovers	2	1
Time of possession	18:47	41:13

Team	Category	Player	Statistics
UMass	Passing	Andrew Brito	6/16, 75 yards, TD, INT
UMass	Rushing	Bilal Ally	10 rushes, 26 yards
UMass	Receiving	Kyle Horn	1 reception, 56 yards, TD
Army	Passing	Jabari Laws	3/5, 48 yards
Army	Rushing	Jabari Laws	8 rushes, 140 yards, TD
Army	Receiving	Artice Hobbs IV	1 reception, 30 yards

=== At Northwestern ===
	1	2	3	4	Total
Minutemen	3	3	0	0	6
Wildcats	0	21	3	21	45

Statistics	MASS	NW
First downs	16	16
Total yards	310	410
Rushing yards	83	334
Passing yards	227	76
Turnovers	1	3
Time of possession	30:08	29:52

Team	Category	Player	Statistics
UMass	Passing	Randall West	19/36, 175 yards, INT
UMass	Rushing	Bilal Ally	16 rushes, 66 yards
UMass	Receiving	Brennon Dingle	4 receptions, 66 yards
Northwestern	Passing	Aidan Smith	7/13, 76 yards, 2 INT
Northwestern	Rushing	Evan Hull	24 rushes, 220 yards, 4 TD
Northwestern	Receiving	Riley Lees	7 receptions, 76 yards

=== BYU ===
	1	2	3	4	Total
Cougars	7	42	7	0	56
Minutemen	0	0	10	14	24

Statistics	BYU	MASS
First downs	26	15
Total yards	628	292
Rushing yards	320	146
Passing yards	308	146
Turnovers	1	2
Time of possession	33:21	26:39

Team	Category	Player	Statistics
BYU	Passing	Zach Wilson	17/20, 293 yards, 4 TD
BYU	Rushing	Jackson McChesney	15 rushes, 228 yards, 2 TD
BYU	Receiving	Talon Shumway	4 receptions, 92 yards, TD
UMass	Passing	Randall West	15/21, 131 yards, 2 TD, INT
UMass	Rushing	Bilal Ally	26 rushes, 127 yards, TD
UMass	Receiving	Josiah Johnson	4 receptions, 49 yards, TD

== Players drafted into the NFL ==
Round	Pick	Player	Position	NFL Club
6	211	Isaiah Rodgers	CB	Indianapolis Colts
