= Miami Carol City Senior High School =

Coordinates: 25.8977490°N 80.2073259°W

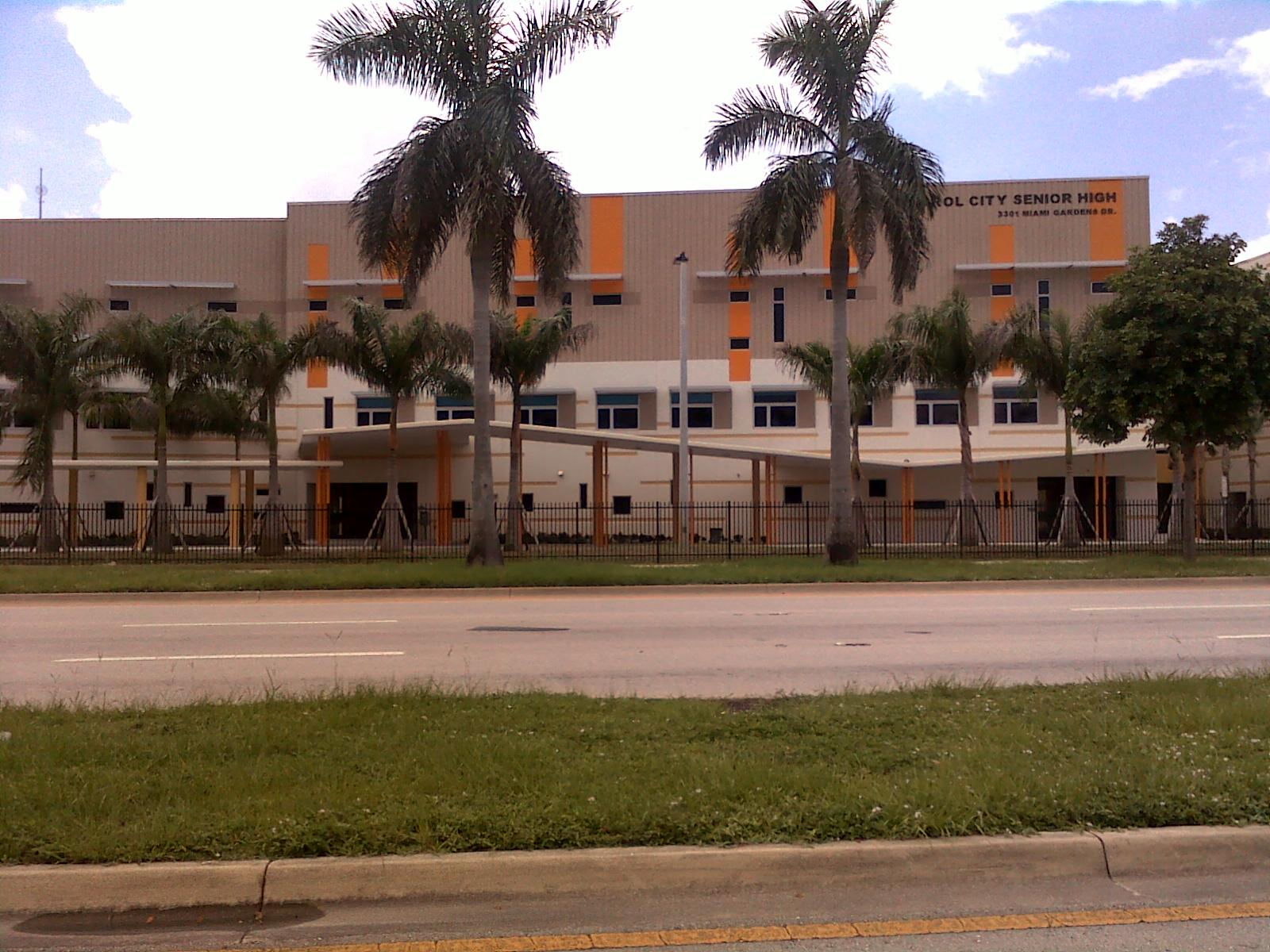

Location
- 3301 Miami Gardens Dr. Miami Gardens, Florida 33056; United States

Information
- Type: Public
- Established: 1963
- School district: Miami-Dade County Public Schools
- Principal: Dr. Bridget Washington-Mckinney
- Teaching staff: 48.00 (FTE)
- Grades: 9–12
- Enrollment: 807 (2023–2024)
- Student to teacher ratio: 16.81
- Campus: Urban
- Colors: Orange; Black; White
- Nickname: Chiefs
- School hours: 7:20 AM to 2:20 PM
- Average class size: 25
- Website: https://miamicarolcityshs.net/

Miami Carol City Senior High School (MCCSH) is a public high school located at 3301 Miami Gardens Drive in Miami Gardens, Florida, United States. It was established in 1963. The school is part of the Miami-Dade County Public Schools system. The school serves students from the area of Miami Gardens, a community south of Ft. Lauderdale, Florida, north of downtown Miami, Florida and home to the Miami Dolphins, in what is currently known as Hard Rock Stadium.

== History ==
The school opened in an unincorporated area of Miami-Dade County in 1963. At the time, farms were in the surrounding area. Several years later integration busing brought African Americans from areas such as Bunche Park to Carol City. The school was racially integrated in 1967.

In 1986, ten faculty members, including three teachers, were found to have engaged in crimes; each person was found to have committed recreational drug use or property theft.

The school was formerly located within the census-designated place of Carol City. Miami Gardens incorporated as a city on May 13, 2003.

Garcia said that, in 2006, "a familial closeness still defined the school. And Carol City High students — until they graduated or dropped out, at least — seemed safe from the violence that had gripped the surrounding area." In spring 2006, three students from the class of 2006 were murdered; none of them were members of gangs, nor were they involved in the recreational drug trade. After Miami Carol City held its graduation ceremony, three graduates were killed. People in the Miami area referred to the class as the "cursed class of 2006." Garcia said "If there is a curse, it seems it has a much wider breadth than one class" and "Carol City bloodshed has only gained speed" after the class of 2006 graduated, since students from subsequent classes died in violent crimes. On Tuesday November 6, 2007, a robber shot 43 year old Sergio Miranda a teacher, who had been smoking a cigarette outside of the campus building. The 18-year-old robber Patrick Lively stole the teacher's wallet and was later arrested. The teacher survived the shooting. In 2011, Lively received a life sentence. In November 2014, Two teens were shot during a fight at Miami Carol City High School. One of the boys died.

== Demographics ==
Miami Carol City is 86% black, 13% Hispanic, and 1% white non-Hispanic.

== Academics ==
Gus Garcia-Roberts of the Miami New Times said that in the 1970s, the school was considered in the area to be a good school academically and athletically; according to Garcia, "in years before academic performance was distilled as statistic, glowing student testimonials and national contest winners told the story." Between 1974 and 1980, Miami Carol City students received four National Merit Scholarships; of them, three were National Achievement Scholarships for African-American students. Garcia said that the State of Florida "liked to herald the diverse school."

Bob Graham, former Governor of the State of Florida and former US Senator, began his "Workdays" in 1974 at Miami Carol City Senior High. It was a program where he worked eight-hour days at various jobs held by his constituents. Starting in September 1974, Graham taught a semester of civics while serving in the Florida Senate.

The school's academic reputation declined by 1981, when fewer than 70% of the students passed a basic achievement test, resulting in a "deficient" ranking for the school. The school received straight "D" rankings from 1998 to 2006.

According to the Florida Department of Education, Miami Carol City Senior High received the grade of "D" on the School Accountability Reports for the school years 2001-02, 2002–03, 2003–04 and 2004-05.

MCCHS was labeled a "dropout factory" in a Johns Hopkins University study of US Department of Education data. The study looked at the retention rates of students from their freshman to senior year. MCCHS had a retention rate of just 53%, meaning that only 53 out of every 100 students who entered the school as a freshman made it through their senior year and obtained a high school diploma.

== Athletics ==
In the period after the school opened, according to Gus Garcia-Roberts of the Miami New Times, the top sports at Miami Carol were football, basketball and wrestling.

The marching band has been referred to as the "soul" of the school. Garcia said that it no longer "gyrates to Jefferson Airplane." After the demographic shift at the school, according to Garcia, the school still had "its fame for diligent coaching and talented kids."

American football, as of 2009, is the strongest sport at the school. The Chiefs won the Football State Championship in 1977 with a 14-0 season record. In the previous year 1976 the football team were the State Runners Up in football. The school won three American football state championships in a period between 1996 and 2003.

The Chiefs were runner ups for the state basketball championship in 1970, and won the state basketball championship in 1972. The gymnastics team also had state champions in individual events during that period.

== School uniforms ==
The school has for the most part maintained a dress code, with students being required to wear school uniforms in the last few decades.

== Notable alumni ==
- Kantroy Barber (Class of 1991), former NFL running back
- Brisco (Class of 2002)
- Jarvis Brownlee Jr. (Class of 2019), American college football cornerback for the Florida State Seminoles and the Louisville Cardinals
- Stephen Calvert (Class of 2016), former college football quarterback for the Liberty Flames
- Denzel Curry (Class of 2013)
- Laz Diaz (Class of 1982), MLB umpire
- Denzel Daxon (Class of 2019), NFL defensive tackle
- Nick Esasky (Class of 1978), baseball player with the Cincinnati Reds and Atlanta Braves
- Ricky Jean Francois (Class of 2005), former NFL defensive tackle.
- Rashad Fenton (Class of 2015) NFL cornerback for the Kansas City Chiefs and the Atlanta Falcons.
- Flo Rida (Class of 1998)
- Rannell Hall, NFL wide receiver with the Cleveland Browns
- Aubrey Hill (Class of 1990), college football player and coach.
- Allen Hurns (Class of 2010), NFL wide receiver with the Miami Dolphins
- Rashad Jeanty (Class of 2001), former professional football defensive lineman
- Nika King, actress who plays Leslie Bennett in Euphoria
- Trayvon Martin, killed in Sanford, Florida - attended for 9th grade and much of the 10th grade, transferred to Krop High School)
- Eric Moncur (Class of 2003), former professional football defensive end
- Santana Moss (Class of 1997)
- Sinorice Moss (Class of 2002)
- Godfrey Myles (Class of 1987), former NFL player for the Dallas Cowboys
- Fred Nixon (Class of 1976), former NFL player for the Green Bay Packers
- Jo Marie Payton (Class of 1968), actress who played Harriett Winslow in Family Matters
- Kenny Phillips (Class of 2005), former NFL player and Super Bowl XLVI champion
- Ken Pruitt, Florida State Senate President 2006-2008 (Class of 1975)
- William Roberts (Class of 1980), football player for New York Giants, New York Jets and New England Patriots; two-time Super Bowl Champion with the Giants
- Rick Ross (Class of 1994)
- Robert Sands (Class of 2008), former professional football player
- Del Speer (Class of 1989), former NFL player
- John Swain (Class of 1977), former NFL player
- Danny Tartabull (Class of 1980)
- Simeon Thomas (Class of 2013)
- Lester Williams (Class of 1978), former NFL player
- Eugene Wilde, Recording Artist who had two #1 R&B Hits in 1984-85
