= Kyler Edwards =

American basketball player (born 1999)

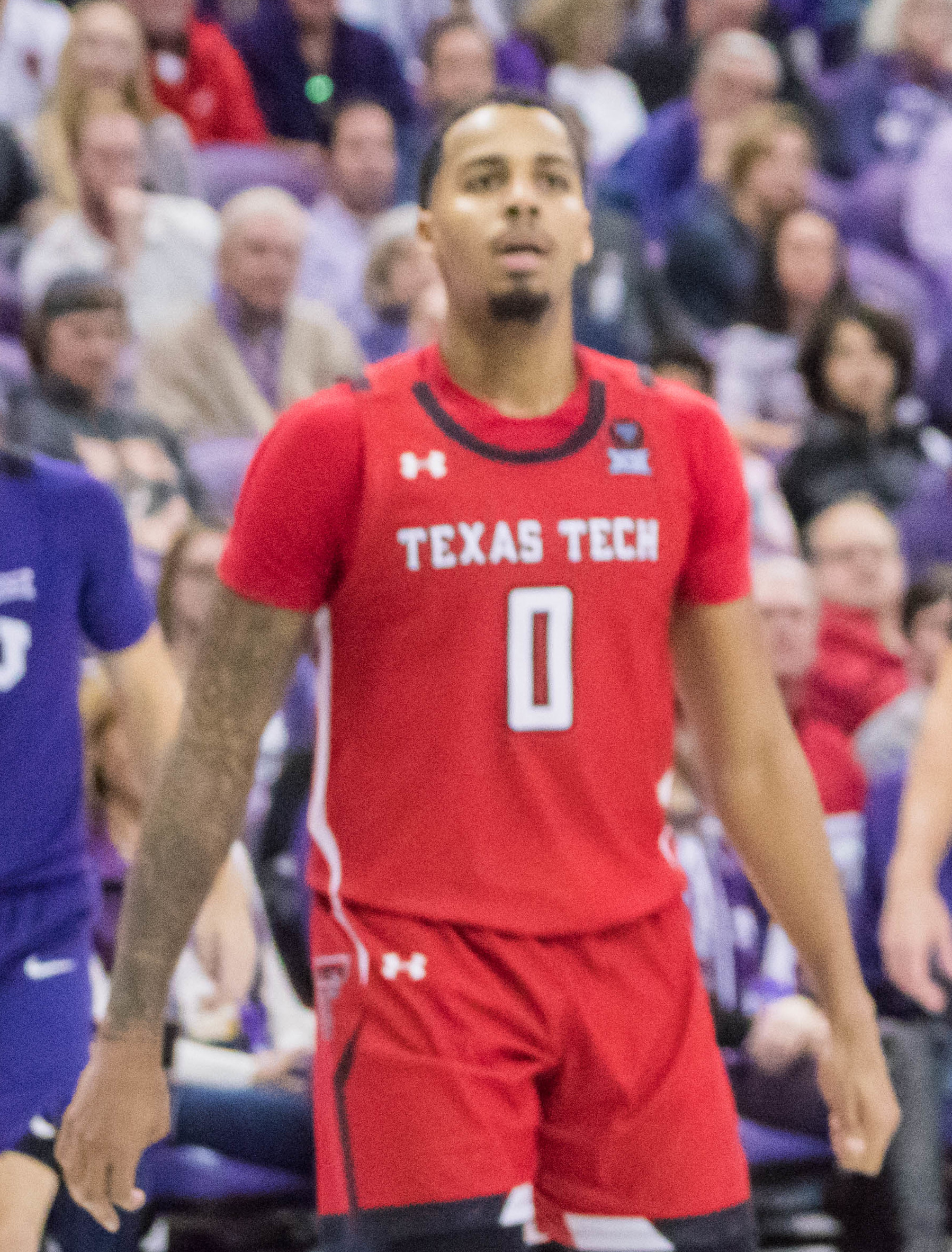

No. 0 – Liaoning Flying Leopards
- Position: Shooting guard
- League: CBA

Personal information
- Born: May 3, 1999 (age 27) Arlington, Texas, U.S.
- Listed height: 6 ft 4 in (1.93 m)
- Listed weight: 205 lb (93 kg)

Career information
- High school: Bowie (Arlington, Texas); Findlay Prep (Henderson, Nevada)
- College: Texas Tech (2018–2021); Houston (2021–2022)
- NBA draft: 2022: undrafted
- Playing career: 2022–present

Career history
- 2022–2023: Motor City Cruise
- 2023–2024: Long Island Nets
- 2024: Metros de Santiago
- 2024: Calgary Surge
- 2024: JDA Dijon
- 2024–2025: Elitzur Netanya
- 2025–2026: Hapoel HaEmek
- 2026–present: Liaoning Flying Leopards

Career highlights
- All-Israeli League First Team (2026); Second-team All-AAC (2022)
- Stats at NBA.com
- Stats at Basketball Reference

Kyler Alexander Edwards (born May 3, 1999) is an American professional basketball player for the Liaoning Flying Leopards of the Chinese Basketball Association (CBA). He played college basketball for the Texas Tech Red Raiders and the Houston Cougars.

== Early life ==
Edwards was born in Arlington, Texas. His mother is Lori Alexander, and his father Kelvin Edwards played wide receiver in the NFL for the New Orleans Saints, Dallas Cowboys, and San Francisco 49ers after playing college football at Liberty University.

== High school career ==
Edwards began his high school career at Bowie High School in Arlington. He played alongside Cade Cunningham. As a junior, he averaged 22.4 points, 6.0 rebounds and 3.1 assists per game and was named District 4-6A Offensive Player of the Year.

For his senior season, Edwards transferred to Findlay Prep in Henderson, Nevada, to play for coach Rodney Haddix. He averaged 16.4 points, 5.2 rebounds, and 4.2 assists per game. Considered a three-star recruit, Edwards committed to playing college basketball for Texas Tech over offers from Butler, Georgia Tech, Houston, Iowa State, Kansas State, LSU, Missouri, Nebraska, Oklahoma State, USC and Virginia Tech.

== College career ==
As a freshman for Texas Tech in 2018-19, he averaged 5.5 points, 2.2 rebounds, and 1.1 assists per game, and shot 44.9% from three point range. In the 2019 NCAA Division I Men's Basketball Championship Game, Edwards scored 12 points and had three rebounds in the loss to Virginia.

On January 20, 2020, Edwards was named Big 12 player of the week after posting 24 points against Kansas State and 22 points in the Red Raiders' home win over Iowa State. He averaged 11.4 points, 4.0 rebounds, and 3.1 assists per game as a sophomore.

As a junior, Edwards averaged 10.1 points, 4.8 rebounds, and 2.8 assists per game, shooting 41.8 percent from three-point range. He was a Big 12 honorable mention selection.

Following the season he opted to transfer to Houston, where he majored in retailing and consumer sciences, picking the Cougars over LSU and Texas. On January 15, 2022, Edwards scored a career-high 29 points including seven three-pointers in a 66–64 win against Tulsa. In 2021-22 Edwards averaged 13.8 points, 5.9 rebounds (10th in the league), and 3.2 assists per game. He was named to the Second Team All-AAC, Lefty Driesell Defensive All-America Team, American Athletic Conference All-Tournament Team, NABC All-District 24 First Team, All-Texas Third Team (Dave Campbell’s Texas Basketball), and All-Texas Defensive Team (Dave Campbell’s Texas Basketball).

== Professional career ==
=== Motor City Cruise (2022–2023) ===
On November 3, 2022, Edwards was named to the opening night roster for the Motor City Cruise of the National Basketball Association (NBA) G League. He averaged 12.0 points, 4.2 rebounds, and 3.1 assists in 25 games.

On May 5, 2023, Edwards signed with the Calgary Surge of the Canadian Elite Basketball League. He was released on May 25 without appearing in a game for the club.

=== Long Island Nets (2023–2024) ===
On September 25, 2023, Edwards signed with the Brooklyn Nets, but was waived three days later.

On October 28, he joined the Long Island Nets of the G League. He averaged 13.3 points, 4.5 rebounds, 3.2 assists, and 1.1 steals per game.

=== Metros de Santiago (2024) ===
On May 24, 2024, Edwards signed with the Metros de Santiago of the Liga Nacional de Baloncesto. He averaged 11.8 points, 2.6 rebounds, and 2.8 assists in five games.

=== Calgary Surge (2024) ===
On July 9, 2024, Edwards signed with the Calgary Surge of the Canadian Elite Basketball League, but was released on July 28 to join JDA Dijon.

=== JDA Dijon (2024) ===
On July 9, 2024, Edwards signed with JDA Dijon of the LNB Élite, with whom he played eight games.

=== Elitzur Netanya (2024–2025) ===
On December 1, 2024, he signed with Elitzur Netanya of the Israeli Basketball Premier League.

=== Hapoel Gilboa Galil (2025–2026) ===
On October 22, 2025, Edwards received a Hoops Agents Player of the Week Award for Round 2. He was the main contributor in his team's victory with 38 points, 6 rebounds, and 3 assists. On November 5, 2025, Edwards received a Hoops Agents Player of the Week Award for Round 4. He had the game-high 25 points, 4 rebounds and 2 assists in his team's victory.

== Career statistics ==
Legend
GP	Games played	GS	Games started	MPG	Minutes per game
FG%	Field goal percentage	3P%	3-point field goal percentage	FT%	Free throw percentage
RPG	Rebounds per game	APG	Assists per game	SPG	Steals per game
BPG	Blocks per game	PPG	Points per game	**Bold**	Career high

=== College ===
Year	Team	GP	GS	MPG	FG%	3P%	FT%	RPG	APG	SPG	BPG	PPG
2018–19	Texas Tech	**38**	0	17.8	**.413**	**.449**	.660	2.2	1.1	.6	.2	5.5
2019–20	Texas Tech	31	31	33.4	.404	.322	.773	4.0	3.1	.9	**.5**	11.4
2020–21	Texas Tech	29	26	31.2	.408	.418	**.789**	4.8	2.8	**1.1**	**.5**	10.1
2021–22	Houston	37	**37**	**34.1**	.369	.333	.697	**5.9**	**3.2**	1.0	.4	**13.8**
Career		135	94	28.7	.393	.361	.729	4.2	2.5	.9	.4	10.1

== Personal life ==
Edwards is the son of Lori Alexander and Kelvin Edwards. His father played football for the Dallas Cowboys in the 1980s.
