= 2019 Liberty Flames football team =

American college football season

2019 Liberty Flames football

Cure Bowl champion

Cure Bowl, W 23–16 vs. Georgia Southern
- Conference: Independent
- Record: 8–5
- Head coach: Hugh Freeze (1st season)
- Co-offensive coordinators: Kent Austin (1st season); Maurice Harris (1st season)
- Offensive scheme: Multiple
- Defensive coordinator: Scott Symons (1st season)
- Base defense: 4–2–5
- Home stadium: Williams Stadium

2019 NCAA Division I FBS independents football records
	Conf.			Overall
Team	W		L	W		L
No. 12 Notre Dame		–		11	–	2
Liberty		–		8	–	5
BYU		–		7	–	6
Army		–		5	–	8
New Mexico State		–		2	–	10
UMass		–		1	–	11
Rankings from AP Poll

The 2019 Liberty Flames football team represented Liberty University in the 2019 NCAA Division I FBS football season. They were led by first-year head coach Hugh Freeze and played their home games at Williams Stadium.

== Schedule ==
Date	Time	Opponent	Site	TV	Result	Attendance
August 31	6:00 p.m.	No. 22 Syracuse	Williams Stadium; Lynchburg, VA	ESPN+	L 0–24	21,671
September 7	7:30 p.m.	at Louisiana	Cajun Field; Lafayette, LA	ESPN+	L 14–35	16,231
September 14	6:00 p.m.	Buffalo	Williams Stadium; Lynchburg, VA	ESPN+	W 35–17	14,584
September 21	6:00 p.m.	Hampton	Williams Stadium; Lynchburg, VA	ESPN+	W 62–27	18,944
September 28	6:00 p.m.	New Mexico	Williams Stadium; Lynchburg, VA	ESPN+	W 17–10	17,101
October 5	8:00 p.m.	at New Mexico State	Aggie Memorial Stadium; Las Cruces, NM	FloSports	W 20–13	23,140
October 19	6:00 p.m.	Maine^{†}	Williams Stadium; Lynchburg, VA	ESPN+	W 59–44	18,657
October 26	12:00 p.m.	at Rutgers	SHI Stadium; Piscataway, NJ	BTN	L 34–44	23,854
November 2	12:00 p.m.	at UMass	Warren McGuirk Alumni Stadium; Hadley, MA	NESN, FloSports	W 63–21	10,184
November 9	7:30 p.m.	at BYU	LaVell Edwards Stadium; Provo, UT	ESPNU	L 24–31	54,683
November 23	12:00 p.m.	at Virginia	Scott Stadium; Charlottesville, VA	ACCRSN	L 27–55	37,329
November 30	2:00 p.m.	New Mexico State	Williams Stadium; Lynchburg, VA	ESPN+	W 49–28	18,674
December 21	2:30 p.m.	vs. Georgia Southern	Exploria Stadium; Orlando, FL (Cure Bowl)	CBSSN	W 23–16	18,158
^{†}Homecoming; Rankings from AP Poll released prior to the game; All times are in Eastern time

== Personnel ==
=== Coaching staff ===
Name	Title	Coach
Hugh Freeze	Head coach	Head coach
Kent Austin	Offensive coordinator	Quarterbacks
Scott Symons	Defensive coordinator	Safety
Vantz Singletary	Co-defensive coordinator	Defensive line
Scott Downing	Special Teams Coordinator	Tight ends and Fullbacks
Mike Brown	Assistant Coach	Running backs
Aaron Stamn	Assistant Coach	offensive line
Kyle DeArmon	Assistant Coach	Wide receivers
Marshall Roberts	Assistant Coach	Cornerbacks
Josh Bookbinder	Assistant Coach	Linebackers
Bryant Lewellyn	Assistant Coach	Defensive tackles

== Game summaries ==
=== Syracuse ===
	1	2	3	4	Total
No. 22 Orange	3	7	7	7	24
Flames	0	0	0	0	0

=== At Louisiana ===
	1	2	3	4	Total
Flames	7	7	0	0	14
Ragin' Cajuns	7	14	14	0	35

=== Buffalo ===
	1	2	3	4	Total
Bulls	0	7	3	7	17
Flames	7	21	7	0	35

=== Hampton ===
	1	2	3	4	Total
Pirates	12	0	8	7	27
Flames	27	14	7	14	62

=== New Mexico ===
	1	2	3	4	Total
Lobos	0	3	0	7	10
Flames	7	7	3	0	17

=== At New Mexico State ===
	1	2	3	4	Total
Flames	3	7	3	7	20
Aggies	0	0	6	7	13

=== Maine ===
	1	2	3	4	Total
Black Bears	3	14	7	20	44
Flames	17	28	7	7	59

=== At Rutgers ===
	1	2	3	4	Total
Flames	14	7	3	10	34
Scarlet Knights	7	14	17	6	44

=== At UMass ===
	1	2	3	4	Total
Flames	28	21	14	0	63
Minutemen	7	7	7	0	21

=== At BYU ===
	1	2	3	4	Total
Flames	7	0	10	7	24
Cougars	7	10	7	7	31

=== At Virginia ===
	1	2	3	4	Total
Flames	7	7	7	6	27
Cavaliers	10	14	14	17	55

=== New Mexico State ===
	1	2	3	4	Total
Aggies	7	7	7	7	28
Flames	10	10	15	14	49

=== Vs. Georgia Southern (Cure Bowl) ===
	1	2	3	4	Total
Flames	7	9	7	0	23
Eagles	0	7	6	3	16

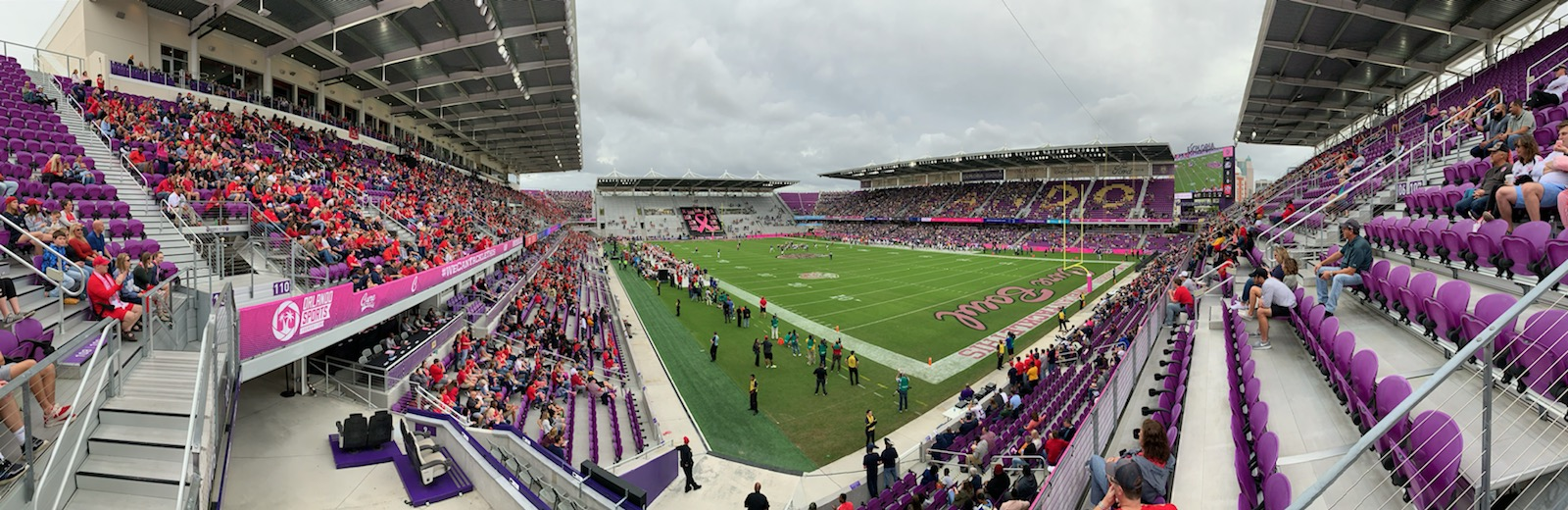
Liberty defeated Georgia Southern at the first American football game played at Exploria Stadium

== Players drafted into the NFL ==
Round	Pick	Player	Position	NFL club
4	142	Antonio Gandy-Golden	WR	Washington Redskins
