= Stephen Calvert =

American football quarterback

No. 12
- Position: Quarterback

Personal information
- Born: March 8 Plantation, Florida, U.S.
- Listed height: 6 ft 2 in (1.88 m)
- Listed weight: 180 lb (82 kg)

Career information
- High school: Miami Carol City (FL)
- College: Liberty (2016–2019)
- Stats at ESPN

Stephen "Buckshot" Calvert is an American former football quarterback for the Liberty Flames.

== Early life ==
Calvert's middle name is "Buckshot," after his father's favorite NASCAR driver, Buckshot Jones. Calvert attended Miami Carol City Senior High School in Miami Gardens, Florida, where he played high school football. Calvert received scholarship offers to play college football for South Florida, Florida International and Liberty. He committed to play college football for coach Turner Gill at Liberty University.

== College career ==
Calvert entered the 2016 season as the backup quarterback to Stephon Masha, but earned the starting job four games into the season and led the team to a 5–2 record over the final seven games of the season. On opening day of the 2017 season, Calvert led the Flames to their biggest win in school history; a 48–45 triumph over Baylor in Waco that marked Liberty's first ever win over a Power Five conference team. In 2018, Calvert led the Flames to a 6–6 record in their first season as a member of the NCAA Division I Football Bowl Subdivision. During Calvert's senior season in 2019, he led the Flames to an 8–5 record and an appearance in the 2019 Cure Bowl, the first bowl appearance in school history. Calvert ended his college career at the Cure Bowl by leading Liberty to a 23–16 win over Georgia Southern, securing Liberty's first bowl win in their first bowl appearance.
