= Jason Huntley =

American football player (born 1998)

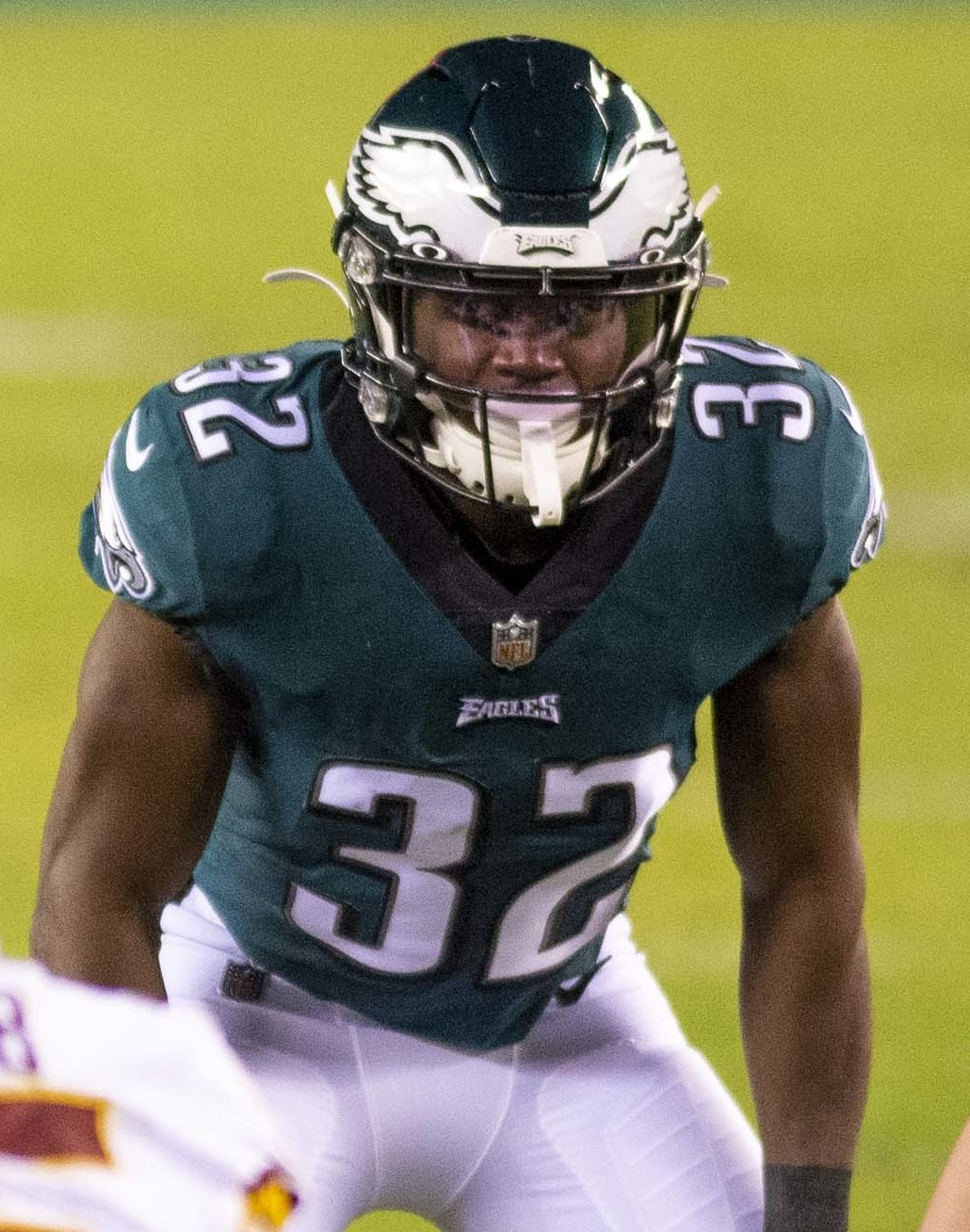
- Huntley with the Philadelphia Eagles in 2021

No. 32, 36, 41
- Position: Running back

Personal information
- Born: April 20, 1998 (age 28); Toledo, Ohio, U.S.
- Listed height: 5 ft 9 in (1.75 m)
- Listed weight: 195 lb (88 kg)

Career information
- High school: Martin (Arlington, Texas)
- College: New Mexico State (2016–2019)
- NFL draft: 2020: 5th round, 172nd overall pick

Career history
- Detroit Lions (2020)*; Philadelphia Eagles (2020–2021); Pittsburgh Steelers (2022)*; Indianapolis Colts (2023)*; BC Lions (2025)*
- * Offseason or practice squad member only

Career NFL statistics
- Rushing yards: 70
- Rushing average: 3.9
- Receptions: 1
- Stats at Pro Football Reference

Jason Kiree Huntley (born April 20, 1998) is an American former professional football running back. He played college football for the New Mexico State Aggies, and was selected by the Detroit Lions in the fifth round of the 2020 NFL draft.

== College career ==
Coming out of Martin High School in Arlington, Texas, Huntley was not highly recruited and signed with New Mexico State. He returned three kickoffs for touchdowns in 2018. In 2019, Huntley rushed for 1,090 yards (7.1 yards per carry) with nine touchdowns and also had 1,119 receiving yards.

== Professional career ==
=== Detroit Lions ===
Huntley was selected by the Detroit Lions in the fifth round with the 172nd overall pick in the 2020 NFL draft. On July 13, 2020, the Lions signed Huntley to a four-year contract. He was waived by the Lions during final roster cuts on September 5, 2020.

=== Philadelphia Eagles ===
Huntley was claimed off waivers by the Philadelphia Eagles on September 6, 2020. He made his NFL debut in Week 1 against the Washington Football Team, and had 1 rushing attempt for 1 yard. He finished the season playing in 5 games, rushing 5 times for 19 yards, and 1 reception for 0 yards.

On August 31, 2021, Huntley was waived by the Eagles and re-signed to the practice squad the next day. He was signed to the active roster on January 10, 2022. He was released on August 30.

=== Pittsburgh Steelers ===
On September 2, 2022, Huntley signed with the Pittsburgh Steelers practice squad. He signed a reserve/future contract on January 10, 2023. He was released on August 1, 2023.

=== Indianapolis Colts ===
On August 9, 2023, Huntley signed with the Indianapolis Colts. He was waived on August 29, 2023, and assigned to the practice squad. He was released on September 12, 2023.

=== BC Lions ===
On February 6, 2025, Huntley signed with the BC Lions of the Canadian Football League (CFL). He was released on May 21, 2025.
