= Dre Barnes =

American college football player

Profile
- Position: Running back

Personal information
- Born: Ocilla, Georgia, U.S.

Career information
- High school: Irwin County
- College: Liberty (2001–2004)

Awards and highlights
- Big South Offensive Player of the Year (2003)

Phillip Verondre (Dre) Barnes (born in Ocilla, Georgia) is an American former college football player who was a running back for the Liberty Flames. He finished his career as Liberty's all-time leading rusher.

== Early life ==
Barnes graduated from Irwin County High School as a four-year letterwinner. He finished his career as the school's all-time leading rusher with over 5,200 career yards. He also finished with 640 career receiving yards. He rushed for 1,609 yards on 223 carries during his senior season and for 1,649 yards on 230 carries as a junior. Barnes was named ICHS Most Valuable Running Back and Most Valuable Offensive Player as a senior, 2000 ICHS Big Player Maker of the Year and 2000 Region 2AA Offensive Player of the Year.

== College career ==
2001 (Freshman - 566 yards, 5 TD, 80.9 ypg)

- Football Gazette Honorable-Mention All-American

- 1AA All-Independent Team - Second Team

- Flames' 2001 Offensive Team MVP

- Recorded the most rushing and total offensive yards in school history by a freshman

- Averaged 6.4 yd. per carry = second highest individual average in school history

- Three 100-yard rushing performances as a true freshman

- Essentially missed four games as he suffered an ankle injury on the first play against UCF and missed the following three games

2002 (Sophomore - 1,304 yards, 5 TD, 118.5 ypg)

- Big South First Team All-Conference

- Football Gazette Honorable-Mention Preseason All-American

- Football Gazette Southeast Region - Second Team

- Rushed for then school-record 1,304 yards

- Finished fourth in the nation in rushing yards per game (118.5)

- Recorded the sixth most rushing attempts in school history

- Set a new school record with seven 100-yard rushing performances

- Three-time Big South Offensive Player of the Week

2003 (Junior - 1,347 yards, 7 TD, 111.2 ypg)

- Big South Preseason Offensive Player of the Year

- Big South Offensive Player of the Year

- Big South First-Team All-State

- Set a new school record with 1,347 yards rushing

- Finished 15th in the nation in total rushing yards

- Recorded four 100-yard rushing performance, bringing his career 100-yard games to 15 - two behind the school record

- Finished the season ranked second on Liberty's all-time rushing list with 3,305 career yards and needed just 406 yards to become the school's all-time leader

2004 (Senior - Injured part way through the season)

RUSHING	GP	Att	Gain	Loss	Net	Avg	TD	Long	Avg/G
Samkon Gado	9	138	953	52	901	6.5	11	79	100.1
Dre Barnes	6	113	776	18	758	6.7	3	32	126.3
Eugene Goodman	5	113	637	28	609	5.4	3	36	121.8
