= Jessie Lemonier =

American football player (1997–2023)

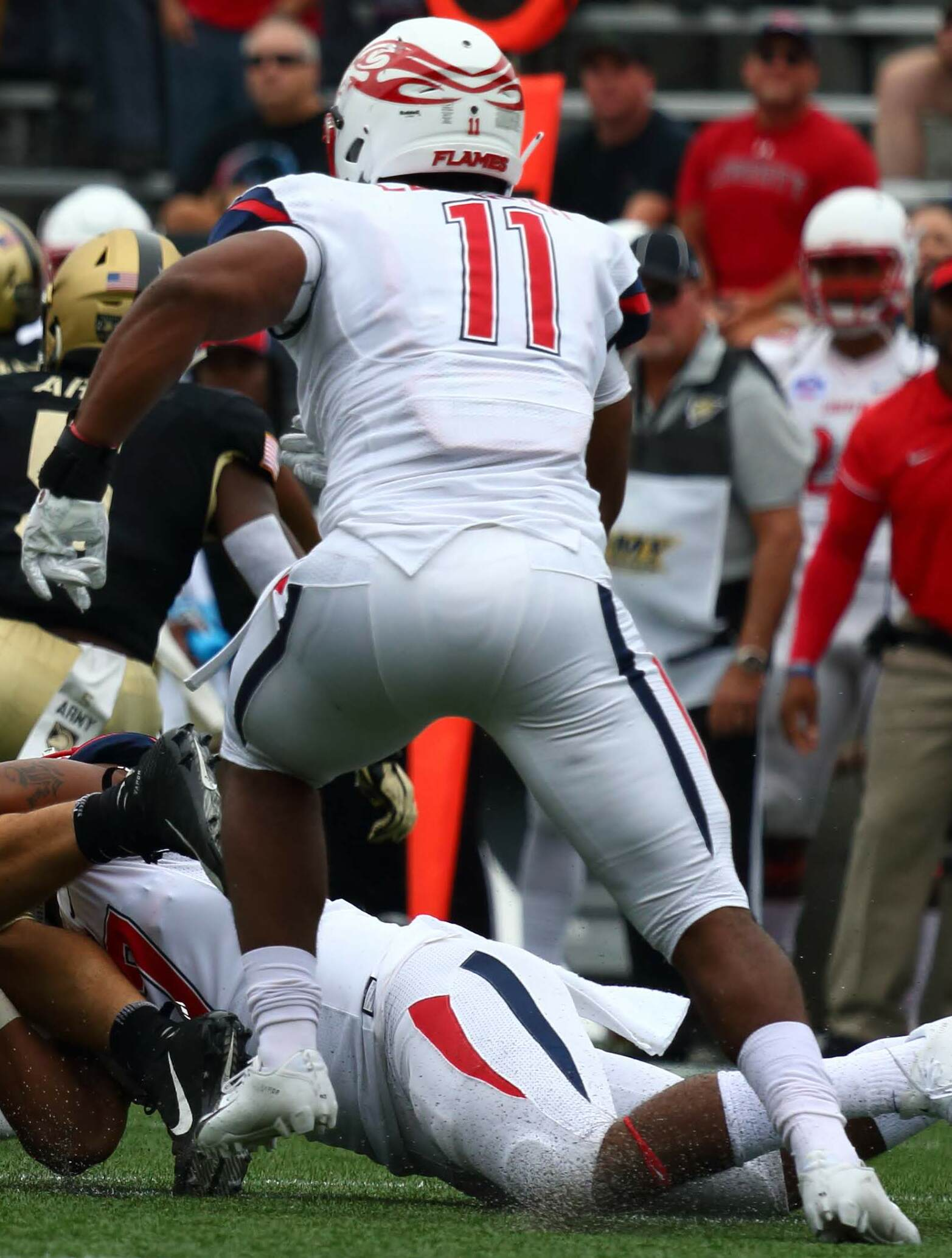
- Lemonier with the Liberty Flames in 2018

No. 90, 58, 52, 53
- Position: Linebacker

Personal information
- Born: January 31, 1997; Hialeah, Florida, U.S.
- Died: January 26, 2023 (aged 25)
- Listed height: 6 ft 2 in (1.88 m)
- Listed weight: 240 lb (109 kg)

Career information
- High school: Hialeah (FL)
- College: Ventura CC (2015–2017); Liberty (2018–2019)
- NFL draft: 2020: undrafted

Career history
- Los Angeles Chargers (2020); Detroit Lions (2021); Arizona Cardinals (2022)*; Houston Gamblers (2023)*; Birmingham Stallions (2023)*
- * Offseason or practice squad member only

Career NFL statistics
- Total tackles: 17
- Sacks: 1.5
- Stats at Pro Football Reference

Jessie Nathaniel Lemonier (January 31, 1997 – January 26, 2023) was an American professional football linebacker. He played for the Los Angeles Chargers and Detroit Lions of the National Football League (NFL), and the Birmingham Stallions of the United States Football League (USFL). He was signed by the Chargers as an undrafted free agent in 2020 following his college football career with the Liberty Flames.

== Professional career ==
=== Los Angeles Chargers ===
Lemonier signed with the Los Angeles Chargers as an undrafted free agent following the 2020 NFL draft on April 26, 2020. He was waived during final roster cuts on September 5, and signed to the team's practice squad the next day. Lemonier was promoted to the active roster on September 26, waived on October 24, and re-signed to the practice squad on October 28. He was promoted back to the active roster on November 7, waived on November 28, and re-signed to the practice squad on December 2. Lemonier was elevated to the active roster on December 17 for the team's week 15 game against the Las Vegas Raiders, and reverted back to the practice squad after the game. He was signed to the active roster on December 26.

On August 31, 2021, Lemonier was waived by the Chargers.

=== Detroit Lions ===
On September 2, 2021, Lemonier was signed to the Detroit Lions practice squad. He was promoted to the team's active roster on October 6, and recorded 15 combined tackles and 1.5 sacks across seven appearances (two starts). Lemonier was waived by Detroit on May 16, 2022.

=== Arizona Cardinals ===
On May 17, 2022, Lemonier was claimed off waivers by the Arizona Cardinals. He was released by Arizona on August 17.

=== Birmingham Stallions ===
Lemonier was selected by the Arlington Renegades in the 2023 XFL draft, but instead signed with the Houston Gamblers of the USFL on December 31, 2022. His playing rights were immediately traded to the Birmingham Stallions.

== Death ==
On January 26, 2023, Lemonier died at the age of 25. Lemonier and his girlfriend were expecting their first child at the time of his death. His cause of death is unknown at this time.

== See also ==
- List of gridiron football players who died during their careers
