= Mike Brown (wide receiver) =

American football player and coach (born 1989)

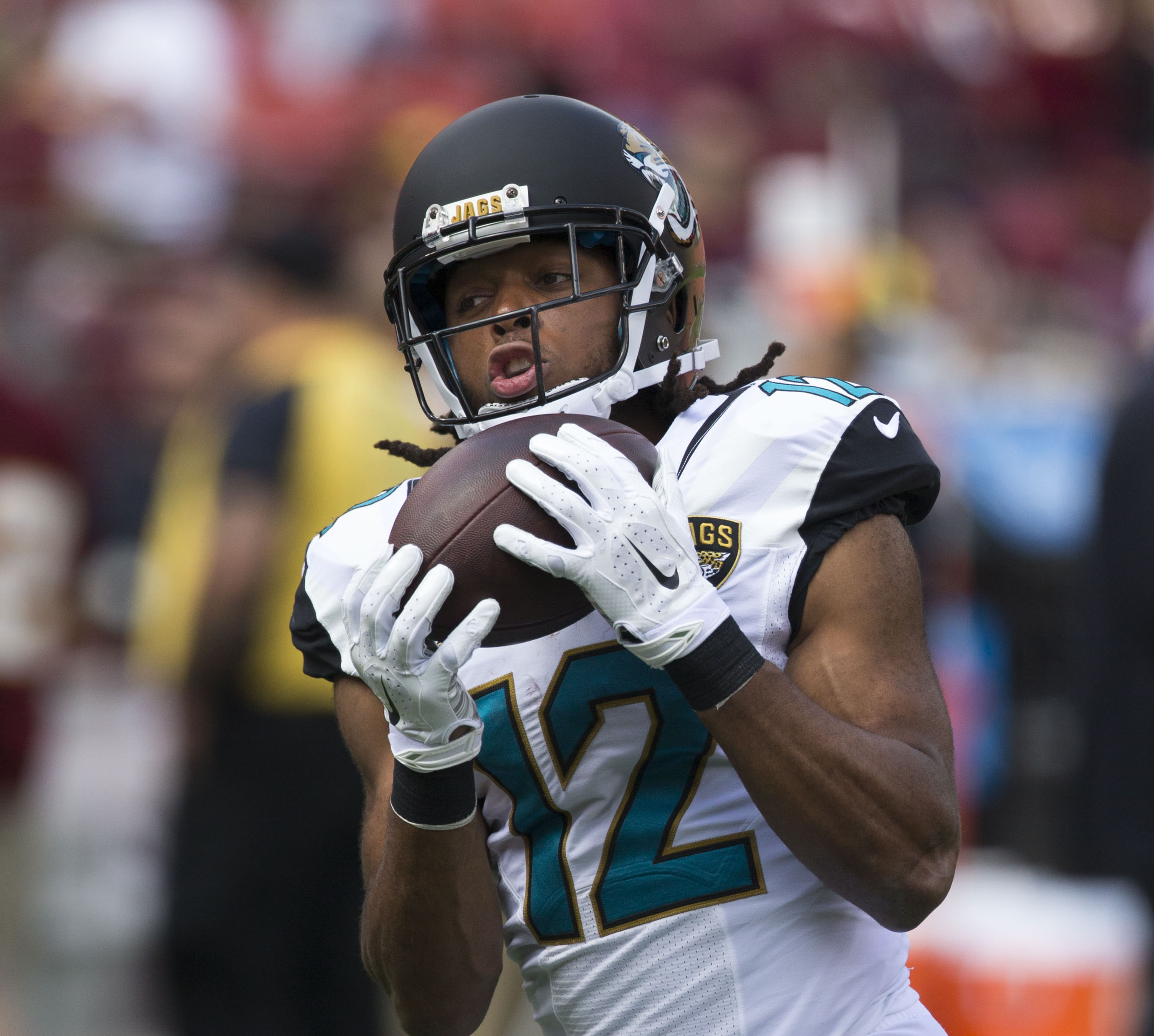
- Brown with the Jacksonville Jaguars in 2014

Current position
- Title: Wide receivers coach
- Team: Notre Dame
- Conference: Independent

Biographical details
- Born: February 9, 1989 (age 37); Charlottesville, Virginia, U.S.

Playing career
- 2008–2011: Liberty
- 2012–2014: Jacksonville Jaguars
- 2015: Carolina Panthers
- Positions: Wide receiver, Return specialist

Coaching career (HC unless noted)
- 2016: Michigan (GA)
- 2017: Delaware (RB)
- 2018: Liberty (RB)
- 2019–2022: Cincinnati (WR)
- 2023: Wisconsin (AHC/WR)
- 2024–present: Notre Dame (WR)

Accomplishments and honors

Awards
- As player: 2× Big South Offensive Player of the Year (2009–2010); 3× Big South All-Conference (2009–2011)

Michael Brown Jr. (born February 9, 1989) is an American football coach and former wide receiver and punt returner who is the wide receivers coach of the Notre Dame Fighting Irish. He previously coached for the Liberty Flames, Cincinnati Bearcats, and Wisconsin Badgers. He was signed by the Jacksonville Jaguars of the National Football League (NFL) as an undrafted free agent in 2012. He played college football for the Liberty Flames, where he played quarterback. He played football at Monticello High School.

== Professional career ==
Pre-draft measurables
Height	Weight	40-yard dash	10-yard split	20-yard split	20-yard shuttle	Three-cone drill	Vertical jump	Broad jump	Bench press
5 ft 10 1/2 in (1.79 m)	205 lb (93 kg)	4.69 s	1.69 s	2.70 s	4.25 s	6.96 s	30.5 in (0.77 m)	9 ft 8 in (2.95 m)	17 reps
All values from Pro Day

=== Jacksonville Jaguars ===
Brown signed with the Jacksonville Jaguars following the 2012 NFL draft as a rookie free agent.

Brown was originally invited to a workout with the Jaguars, and after an impressive showing, he was offered a contract. He spent most of the 2012 season on the team's practice squad before being promoted to the active roster on December 18.

Brown scored his first career touchdown on a 29-yard reception from quarterback Chad Henne against the San Francisco 49ers in London.

He was released on November 28, 2014. He was signed to Jacksonville's practice squad on December 2, 2014.

=== Carolina Panthers ===
On January 15, 2015, Brown signed with the Carolina Panthers to a contract. On September 5, 2015, he was released by the Panthers.

== Coaching career ==
=== Liberty ===
Brown first joined the coaching staff at his alma mater Liberty as the running backs coach.

=== Cincinnati ===
Brown joined the Cincinnati Bearcats for the 2019 season as the wide receiver coach.

After the 2021 season, Brown received the additional role of passing game coordinator after the promotion of Gino Guidugli to offensive coordinator.

=== Wisconsin ===
Wisconsin hired Luke Fickell from Cincinnati to replace Paul Chryst as head coach after the 2022 season. Fickell again hired Brown to be his wide receiver coach.

=== Notre Dame ===
After the 2023 season, Notre Dame hired Brown as its wide receiver coach, reuniting him with former Cincinnati staffers Marcus Freeman, Mike Mickens, and Gino Guidugli.
