= Chris Summers (wide receiver) =

American football player (born 1989)

No. 87
- Position: Wide receiver

Personal information
- Born: July 10, 1989 (age 37); Jacksonville, Florida, U.S.
- Listed height: 6 ft 5 in (1.96 m)
- Listed weight: 215 lb (98 kg)

Career information
- High school: Jacksonville (FL) Jean Ribault
- College: Liberty
- NFL draft: 2012: undrafted

Career history
- Chicago Bears (2012)*; Minnesota Vikings (2012−2013)*; Los Angeles Kiss (2014)*; Buffalo Bills (2014)*; Jacksonville Sharks (2015); Arizona Rattlers (2015–2016)
- * Offseason or practice squad member only

Career AFL statistics
- Receptions: 1
- Receiving yards: 16
- Stats at ArenaFan.com
- Stats at Pro Football Reference

Chris Summers (born July 10, 1989) is an American former professional football wide receiver. He played college football at Liberty University. He signed with the Chicago Bears as an undrafted free agent in 2012.

== Professional career ==
=== Chicago Bears ===
On April 29, 2012, he signed with the Chicago Bears as an undrafted free agent. On August 26, he was released.

=== Minnesota Vikings ===
On September 3, 2012, he signed with the Minnesota Vikings. On January 7, 2013, he was signed to a reserve/future contract. Summers was released by the Vikings on August 26, 2013 (along with 12 others) to get to a 75-man roster.

=== Buffalo Bills ===
Summers signed with the Buffalo Bills during the 2014 offseason, but was released on August 25, 2014.

=== Arizona Rattlers ===
Summers joined the Arizona Rattlers in 2015. On May 3, 2016, Summers was placed on reassignment.
