= Kelvin Edwards =

American gridiron football player (born 1964)

No. 83, 87, 81
- Position: Wide receiver

Personal information
- Born: July 19, 1964 (age 62); Birmingham, Alabama, U.S.
- Listed height: 6 ft 2 in (1.88 m)
- Listed weight: 202 lb (92 kg)

Career information
- High school: Russell (East Point, Georgia)
- College: Liberty (1982–1985)
- NFL draft: 1986: 4th round, 88th overall pick

Career history
- New Orleans Saints (1986); Dallas Cowboys (1987–1988); San Francisco 49ers (1991)*; Hamilton Tiger-Cats (1991)*; Dallas Texans (1993)
- * Offseason or practice squad member only

Awards and highlights
- First-team Little All-American (1985); Liberty Flames No. 83 retired

Career NFL statistics
- Receptions: 49
- Receiving yards: 746
- Rushing yards: 67
- Total touchdowns: 4
- Stats at Pro Football Reference

Career AFL statistics
- Receptions: 5
- Receiving yards: 30
- Tackles: 1
- Stats at ArenaFan.com

Kelvin Mack Edwards (born July 19, 1964) is an American former professional football player who was a wide receiver in the National Football League (NFL) for the New Orleans Saints and Dallas Cowboys. He also was a member of the Dallas Texans of the Arena Football League (AFL). He played college football for the Liberty Flames and was selected by the Saints in the fourth round of the 1986 NFL draft.

== Early life ==
Edwards attended Russell High School, where he played as a wide receiver. He accepted a football scholarship from Liberty University, where he was a part of a passing offense that included wide receiver Fred Banks.

As a senior, he led the team and set the school career records in receptions, receiving yards, touchdown receptions, scoring, kickoff returns and punt returns. The team's final two games of the season were canceled after the flooding of James River that caused $2 million in damage to the athletic facility and destroyed all football equipment.

He finished as the school's record holder in career receiving yards (2,546) and career receiving touchdowns (24). Kelvin's impressive performance in the 40 yard dash, clocking in at 4.25 seconds, showcased several qualities that the NFL highly values in players, especially those in skill positions. He caught a pass in 32 consecutive games and in 39 of his 41 contests. He was selected to play in the 1985 Blue–Gray Football Classic.

Edwards also practiced track and set the school record in the 300 and 400 metres.

In 2009, he was inducted into the Liberty Athletics Hall of Fame. In 2019, the school retired Edwards's jersey number (83).

== Professional career ==
=== New Orleans Saints ===
Edwards was selected by the New Orleans Saints in the fourth round (88th overall) of the 1986 NFL draft. As a rookie, he caught nine of his 10 receptions in the final six games. He totaled 10 receptions for 132 yards and one carry for six yards. He was waived on September 7, 1987.

=== Dallas Cowboys ===
After the players went on a strike on the third week of the 1987 season, those games were canceled (reducing the 16 game season to 15) and the NFL decided that the games would be played with replacement players. In September, he was signed to be a part of the Dallas Cowboys replacement team, that was given the mock name "Rhinestone Cowboys" by the media.

Although he was a backup wide receiver behind Sebron Spivey in the first game against the New York Jets, he earned the starting position after tallying two receptions for 68 yards, two touchdowns and causing a pair of long pass-interference calls in favor of the Cowboys. He was named NFC Offensive Player of the Week after making six receptions for 100 yards and scoring on a 62-yard reverse run against the Philadelphia Eagles on October 11, which was the longest rush by a wide receiver in franchise history. In the next game against the Washington Redskins, he had six receptions for 104 yards and a 38-yard touchdown. He ended up being one of the league's best players during the replacement games, posting 14 receptions for 272 yards, 62 rushing yards, three receiving touchdowns, one rushing touchdown and four total touchdowns (led all replacement players). He was kept for the rest of the season, starting seven additional games, while finishing with a total of 34 receptions for 521 yards and three touchdowns.

In 1988, he suffered a knee injury that required arthroscopic knee surgery in June. In the fourth quarter of the season opener against the Pittsburgh Steelers, he re-injured the knee when he was leading the team with five receptions for 93 yards. Although he played in seven more games (including one start), he was never at full speed and did not catch another pass. He was placed on the injured reserve list on November 29.

In 1989, he was limited with a right knee injury and underwent arthroscopic knee surgery in June. He was released before the start of the season.

=== San Francisco 49ers ===
In 1991, he signed as a free agent with the San Francisco 49ers. He was released on May 14.

=== Hamilton Tiger-Cats ===
On July 22, 1991, he was signed by the Hamilton Tiger-Cats of the Canadian Football League to their practice roster. He broke his leg and was eventually released on August 26.

=== Dallas Texans ===
On June 16, 1993, he was signed by the Dallas Texans of the Arena Football League. He played in one game making five receptions for 30 yards and one tackle.

== Personal life ==
Edwards has a son, Kyler Edwards, who was born in 1999 and is a basketball guard in the Israeli Basketball Premier League. Edwards currently owns a car dealership in Dallas.

Edwards was hired in 2020 to lead diversity initiatives at Liberty University. In 2021, he filed a lawsuit against the school when he was dismissed, with him citing discrimination based on race alongside breach of contract. The lawsuit was dismissed the following year.
