= Antonio Gandy-Golden =

American football player (born 1998)

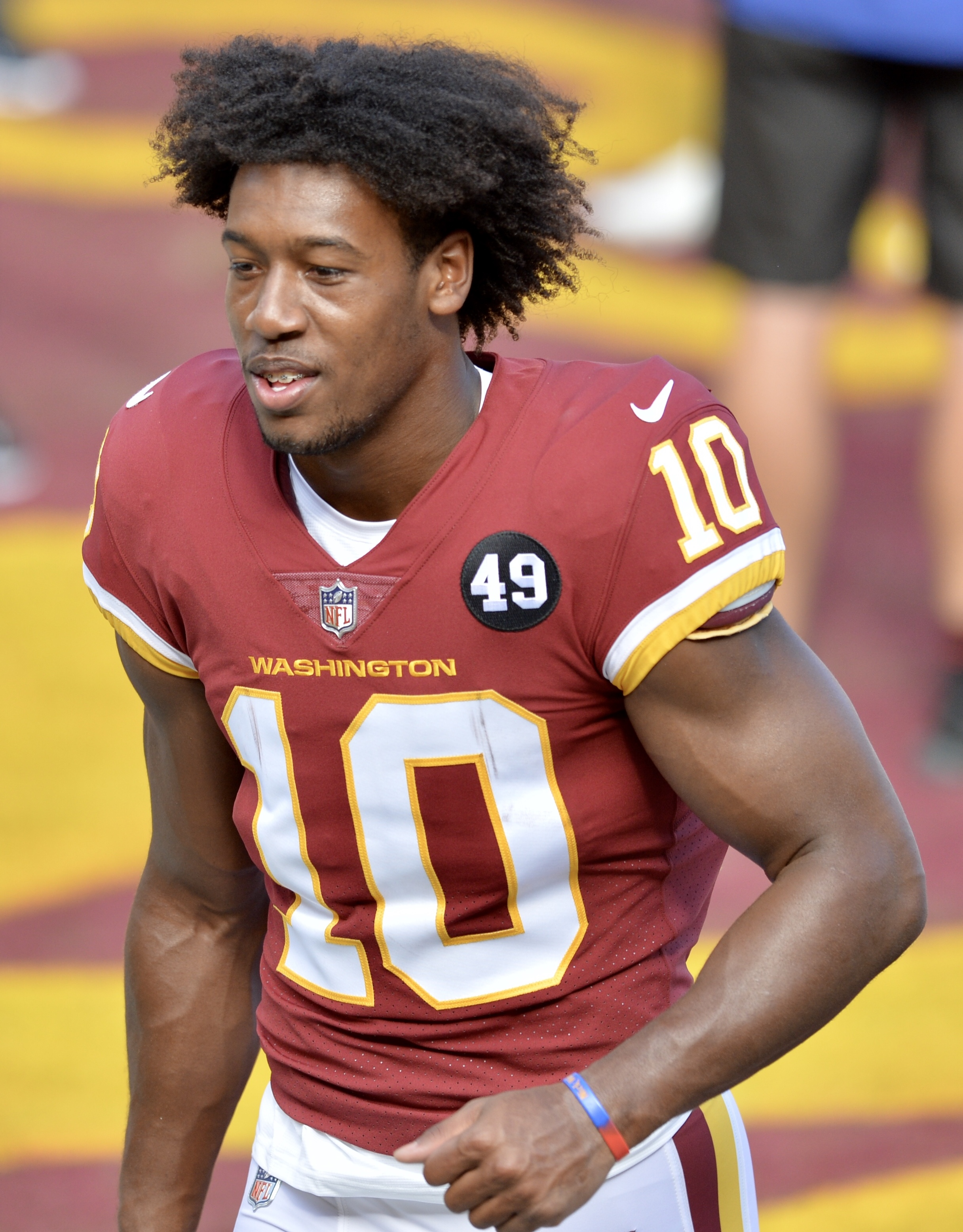
- Gandy-Golden with the Washington Football Team in 2020

No. 10, 11, 18
- Position: Wide receiver

Personal information
- Born: April 11, 1998 (age 28); Chicago, Illinois, U.S.
- Listed height: 6 ft 4 in (1.93 m)
- Listed weight: 223 lb (101 kg)

Career information
- High school: Paulding County (Dallas, Georgia)
- College: Liberty (2016–2019)
- NFL draft: 2020: 4th round, 142nd overall pick

Career history
- Washington Football Team (2020–2021)

Career NFL statistics
- Receptions: 1
- Receiving yards: 3
- Rushing yards: 22
- Stats at Pro Football Reference

Antonio Gandy-Golden (born April 11, 1998) is an American former professional football player who was a wide receiver in the National Football League (NFL). He played college football for the Liberty Flames and was selected by the Washington Football Team in the fourth round of the 2020 NFL draft. Gandy-Golden retired from the NFL after two seasons in order to return to school.

== Early life ==
Gandy-Golden attended Paulding County High School in Dallas, Georgia, where he played wide receiver on the football team. He was a 2-star recruit according to Rivals.com. Following high school, Gandy-Golden committed to Liberty University over offers from Elon, Mercer, Murray State, Kennesaw State and Samford.

== College career ==
As a freshman, Gandy-Golden recorded 315 receiving yards and three touchdown receptions. In his sophomore season, he led the Big South in receptions and receiving yards, also becoming Liberty's seventh 1,000-yard receiver in program history.

In his junior season, Gandy-Golden recorded 245 receiving yards against New Mexico, breaking the school's record. He was a part of Liberty's victory in the 2019 Cure Bowl, the school's first bowl game and his final college game. He finished his career at Liberty as the only player there to post three connective thousand yard receiving seasons. As a student, he pursued a major in graphic design.

=== College statistics ===
Year	Team	Receiving				
Year	Team	G	Rec	Yds	Avg	TD
2016	Liberty	11	21	315	15	3
2017	Liberty	11	69	1,066	15.4	10
2018	Liberty	11	71	1,037	14.6	10
2019	Liberty	13	79	1,396	17.7	10
Total		45	240	3,814	15.9	33

== Professional career ==
Pre-draft measurables
Height	Weight	Arm length	Hand span	Wingspan	40-yard dash	10-yard split	20-yard split	20-yard shuttle	Three-cone drill	Vertical jump	Broad jump	Bench press
6 ft 4 in (1.93 m)	223 lb (101 kg)	31 3/4 in (0.81 m)	9 5/8 in (0.24 m)	6 ft 5 in (1.96 m)	4.60 s	1.54 s	2.72 s	4.55 s	7.33 s	36.0 in (0.91 m)	10 ft 7 in (3.23 m)	22 reps
All values from NFL Combine

Gandy-Golden was selected by the Washington Redskins in the fourth round of the 2020 NFL draft with the 142nd overall pick. He signed his four-year rookie contract on July 22, 2020. He recorded his first reception for three yards in a Week 2 loss to the Arizona Cardinals. He was placed on injured reserve on October 24, 2020, due to a hamstring injury, and rejoined the active roster on December 26, 2020.

Gandy-Golden was waived on August 31, 2021, but re-signed to the practice squad the following day. He was elevated to the active roster for the game against the New Orleans Saints in Week 5. He was signed to the active roster on October 23. He was waived on January 1, 2022 and re-signed to the practice squad. He signed a reserve/futures contract after the 2021 regular season ended.

Gandy-Golden announced his retirement in July 2022 with plans to return to school. He was working on switching from wide receiver to tight end that offseason and finished his NFL career recording only one reception for three yards.

== Personal life ==
Gandy-Golden grew up performing gymnastics and juggling, which he attributed to helping him later in football. He has also been noted for having several other talents, such as his ability to solve a Rubik's Cube in under a minute and achieving a perfect game in bowling. He also draws, paints, and plays guitar as a hobby.

Gandy-Golden was diagnosed with COVID-19 in March 2020.
