= 2018 Liberty Flames football team =

American college football season

2018 Liberty Flames football
- Conference: Independent
- Record: 6–6
- Head coach: Turner Gill (7th season)
- Offensive coordinator: Joe Dailey (3rd season)
- Offensive scheme: Spread
- Co-defensive coordinators: Robert Wimberly (7th season); Vantz Singletary (7th season)
- Base defense: 4–3
- Home stadium: Williams Stadium

2018 NCAA Division I FBS independents football records
	Conf.			Overall
Team	W		L	W		L
No. 5 Notre Dame ^		–		12	–	1
No. 19 Army		–		11	–	2
BYU		–		7	–	6
Liberty		–		6	–	6
UMass		–		4	–	8
New Mexico State		–		3	–	9
^ – College Football Playoff participant; Rankings from AP Poll

The 2018 Liberty Flames football team represented Liberty University in the 2018 NCAA Division I FBS football season. They were led by seventh-year head coach Turner Gill and played their home games at Williams Stadium. This was the Flames first year as a member of the FBS. Playing as an independent, they finished the season 6–6. As part of their transition to FBS, since they won six games, Liberty would have been allowed to apply for bowl eligibility had there not been enough teams with non-losing records to fill the available bowl games, but there were already four more teams than could be accommodated.

On December 3, head coach Turner Gill retired. He finished at Liberty with a seven-year record of 47–35. On December 7, Liberty hired former Ole Miss head coach Hugh Freeze for the job.

== Schedule ==
Date	Time	Opponent	Site	TV	Result	Attendance
September 1	6:00 p.m.	Old Dominion	Williams Stadium; Lynchburg, VA	ESPN3	W 52–10	20,425
September 8	12:00 p.m.	at Army	Michie Stadium; West Point, NY	CBSSN	L 14–38	25,133
September 22	6:00 p.m.	North Texas	Williams Stadium; Lynchburg, VA	ESPN3	L 7–47	14,112
September 29	6:00 p.m.	at New Mexico	Dreamstyle Stadium; Albuquerque, NM		W 52–43	18,804
October 6	8:00 p.m.	at New Mexico State	Aggie Memorial Stadium; Las Cruces, NM	Aggie Vision	L 41–49	8,337
October 13	2:00 p.m.	Troy	Williams Stadium; Lynchburg, VA	ESPN3	W 22–16	17,389
October 20	2:00 p.m.	Idaho State^{†}	Williams Stadium; Lynchburg, VA	ESPN3	W 48–41	16,502
November 3	3:30 p.m.	at UMass	McGuirk Stadium; Hadley, MA	ELVN	L 59–62 ^{3OT}	10,338
November 10	3:00 p.m.	at Virginia	Scott Stadium; Charlottesville, VA	ACCRSN	L 24–45	41,485
November 17	4:00 p.m.	at Auburn	Jordan-Hare Stadium; Auburn, AL	SECN Alternate	L 0–53	81,129
November 24	2:00 p.m.	New Mexico State	Williams Stadium; Lynchburg, VA	ESPN3	W 28–21	16,022
December 1 (Note: Game originally scheduled for September 15, but moved in anticipation of Hurricane Florence.)	2:00 p.m.	Norfolk State	Williams Stadium; Lynchburg, VA	ESPN3	W 52–17	13,243
^{†}Homecoming; All times are in Eastern time

== Game summaries ==
=== Old Dominion ===
	1	2	3	4	Total
Monarchs	3	7	0	0	10
Flames	14	0	10	28	52

=== At Army ===
	1	2	3	4	Total
Flames	0	0	14	0	14
Black Knights	14	3	7	14	38

=== North Texas ===
	1	2	3	4	Total
Mean Green	14	7	6	20	47
Flames	0	7	0	0	7

=== At New Mexico ===
	1	2	3	4	Total
Flames	21	21	0	10	52
Lobos	7	3	13	20	43

=== At New Mexico State ===
	1	2	3	4	Total
Flames	7	7	14	13	41
Aggies	7	14	14	14	49

=== Troy ===
	1	2	3	4	Total
Trojans	7	3	3	3	16
Flames	0	14	0	8	22

=== Idaho State ===
	1	2	3	4	Total
Bengals	0	17	14	10	41
Flames	7	13	14	14	48

=== At UMass ===
	1	2	3	4	OT	2OT	3OT	Total
Flames	14	10	0	21	7	7	0	59
Minutemen	14	10	7	14	7	7	3	62

=== At Virginia ===
	1	2	3	4	Total
Flames	7	10	7	0	24
Cavaliers	14	10	14	7	45

=== At Auburn ===
	1	2	3	4	Total
Flames	0	0	0	0	0
Tigers	15	17	21	0	53

=== New Mexico State ===
	1	2	3	4	Total
Aggies	14	0	0	7	21
Flames	17	11	0	0	28

=== Norfolk State ===
	1	2	3	4	Total
Spartans	3	7	0	7	17
Flames	10	28	7	7	52

This game was originally scheduled for September 15, but it was rescheduled due to Hurricane Florence. On December 4, 2018, Turner Gill announced that he would retire immediately. On December 7, Hugh Freeze was tabbed to be the next head coach of the Liberty Flames football team.
