= 2019 Appalachian State Mountaineers football team =

American college football season

2019 Appalachian State Mountaineers football

Sun Belt champion Sun Belt East Division champion New Orleans Bowl champion

Sun Belt Championship Game, W 45–38 vs. Louisiana

New Orleans Bowl, W 31–17 vs. UAB
- Conference: Sun Belt Conference
- East Division

Ranking
- Coaches: No. 18
- AP: No. 19
- Record: 13–1 (7–1 Sun Belt)
- Head coach: Eliah Drinkwitz (1st season; regular season); Shawn Clark (interim; bowl game)
- Offensive scheme: Multiple
- Defensive coordinator: Ted Roof (1st season)
- Base defense: 4–3
- Home stadium: Kidd Brewer Stadium

2019 Sun Belt Conference football standings
	Conf.			Overall
Team	W		L	W		L
East Division
No. 19 Appalachian State x$	7	–	1	13	–	1
Georgia Southern	5	–	3	7	–	6
Georgia State	4	–	4	7	–	6
Troy	3	–	5	5	–	7
Coastal Carolina	2	–	6	5	–	7
West Division
Louisiana x	7	–	1	11	–	3
Arkansas State	5	–	3	8	–	5
Louisiana–Monroe	4	–	4	5	–	7
Texas State	2	–	6	3	–	9
South Alabama	1	–	7	2	–	10
Championship: Appalachian State 45, Louisiana 38
$ – Conference champion; x – Division champion/co-champions; Rankings from AP Poll

The 2019 Appalachian State Mountaineers football team represented Appalachian State University during the 2019 NCAA Division I FBS football season. The Mountaineers were led by first-year head coach Eliah Drinkwitz through the team's win in the Sun Belt Conference Championship Game, after which he left to fill the head coaching vacancy at Missouri. Shawn Clark led the team during their bowl game appearance. Appalachian State played their home games at Kidd Brewer Stadium on the school's Boone, North Carolina, campus, and competed as a member of the East Division of the Sun Belt Conference.

== Preseason ==
=== Recruiting ===
The Mountaineers signed 18 recruits.

College recruiting (2019)
Name	Hometown	School	Height	Weight	Commit date
Brendan Harrington; S	Pittsboro, North Carolina	Northwood	6 ft 1 in (1.85 m)	205 lb (93 kg)	Dec 16, 2018
Brendan Harrington; S	Recruit ratings: Rivals: 247Sports: ESPN:				
Jourdan Heilig; OLB	Concord, North Carolina	Concord	6 ft 2 in (1.88 m)	200 lb (91 kg)	Jun 26, 2018
Jourdan Heilig; OLB	Recruit ratings: Rivals: 247Sports: ESPN:				
Tre Caldwell; CB	Greensboro, North Carolina	Southeast Guilford	5 ft 10 in (1.78 m)	194 lb (88 kg)	Jun 14, 2018
Tre Caldwell; CB	Recruit ratings: Rivals: 247Sports: ESPN:				
Nicholas Ross; S	Marietta, Georgia	Carlton J. Kell	5 ft 11 in (1.80 m)	175 lb (79 kg)	Jun 19, 2018
Nicholas Ross; S	Recruit ratings: Rivals: 247Sports: ESPN:				
Luke Smith; DT	Lebanon, Tennessee	Friendship Christian	6 ft 1 in (1.85 m)	290 lb (130 kg)	Feb 19, 2018
Luke Smith; DT	Recruit ratings: Rivals: 247Sports: ESPN:				
Dashaun Davis; ATH	Deerfield Beach, Florida	Deerfield Beach	5 ft 9 in (1.75 m)	160 lb (73 kg)	Jun 21, 2018
Dashaun Davis; ATH	Recruit ratings: Rivals: 247Sports:				
Ricky Kofoed; TE	Charlotte, North Carolina	Charlotte Christian	6 ft 3 in (1.91 m)	221 lb (100 kg)	Jul 25, 2018
Ricky Kofoed; TE	Recruit ratings: Rivals: 247Sports: ESPN:				
Lyle Hiers; OT	Lake Wales, Florida	Lake Wales	6 ft 5 in (1.96 m)	275 lb (125 kg)	Jun 21, 2018
Lyle Hiers; OT	Recruit ratings: Rivals: 247Sports: ESPN:				
Christian Wells; WR	Fort Lauderdale, Florida	University School	6 ft 1 in (1.85 m)	170 lb (77 kg)	Jun 22, 2018
Christian Wells; WR	Recruit ratings: Rivals: 247Sports: ESPN:				
Milan Tucker; CB	Fort Myers, Florida	Fort Myers	5 ft 11 in (1.80 m)	163 lb (74 kg)	Jun 25, 2018
Milan Tucker; CB	Recruit ratings: Rivals: 247Sports: ESPN:				
KeSean Brown; OLB	Bamberg, South Carolina	Bamberg-Ehrhardt	6 ft 2 in (1.88 m)	210 lb (95 kg)	Jan 21, 2019
KeSean Brown; OLB	Recruit ratings: Rivals: 247Sports: ESPN:				
Larry Dowdy; OT	Belmont, North Carolina	South Point	6 ft 4 in (1.93 m)	280 lb (130 kg)	Jan 30, 2019
Larry Dowdy; OT	Recruit ratings: Rivals: 247Sports: ESPN:				
David Baldwin; QB	Bradenton, Florida	IMG Academy	6 ft 4 in (1.93 m)	214 lb (97 kg)	Feb 6, 2019
David Baldwin; QB	Recruit ratings: Rivals: 247Sports: ESPN:				
Christian Johnstone; LS	Lawrenceville, Georgia	Archer	6 ft 3 in (1.91 m)	240 lb (110 kg)	Feb 6, 2019
Christian Johnstone; LS	Recruit ratings: Rivals: 247Sports:				
Craig McFarland; OT	Scottsdale, Arizona	Chaparral	6 ft 5 in (1.96 m)	275 lb (125 kg)	Feb 6, 2019
Craig McFarland; OT	Recruit ratings: Rivals: 247Sports: ESPN:				
Benjamin Williams; ATH	Charlotte, North Carolina	Charlotte Christian	5 ft 10 in (1.78 m)	185 lb (84 kg)	Feb 6, 2019
Benjamin Williams; ATH	Recruit ratings: Rivals: 247Sports:				
Emmanuel Jenkins; CB	Canton, Georgia	Sequoyah	6 ft 3 in (1.91 m)	200 lb (91 kg)	Feb 6, 2019
Emmanuel Jenkins; CB	Recruit ratings: Rivals: 247Sports:				
Raykwon Anderson; CB	Folkston, Georgia	Charlton County	5 ft 9 in (1.75 m)	167 lb (76 kg)	Feb 6, 2019
Raykwon Anderson; CB	Recruit ratings: Rivals: 247Sports: ESPN:				
Overall recruit ranking: 247Sports: 118
Note: In many cases, Scout, Rivals, 247Sports, On3, and ESPN may conflict in their listings of height and weight.; In these cases, the average was taken. ESPN grades are on a 100-point scale.; Sources: "Appalachian StateFootball commits". Rivals.; "ESPN". ESPN.; "2019 Team Ranking". Rivals.com.

== Personnel ==
=== Coaching staff ===
App State football current coaching staff
Name	Position	Alma Mater	Years at App State
Eliah Drinkwitz	Head Coach	Arkansas Tech University	1st
Ted Roof	Defensive Coordinator/Inside Linebackers	Georgia Institute of Technology	1st
Shawn Clark	Assistant Head Coach/Offensive Line	Appalachian State University	4th
Greg Gasparato	Safeties	Wofford College	2nd
Charlie Harbison	Cornerbacks	Gardner–Webb University	1st
Erik Link	Special Teams Coordinator	Drake University	1st
Garrett Riley	Running Backs	Texas Tech University	1st
D. J. Smith	Outside Linebackers	Appalachian State University	2nd
Anwar Stewart	Defensive Line	University of Kentucky	1st
Pat Washington	Wide Receivers	Auburn University	1st
Justin Watts	Tight Ends/Recruiting Coordinator	Clemson University	5th

=== Roster ===
2019 Appalachian State Mountaineers football roster
Quarterback: 7 Jacob Huesman – junior (6'3, 205); 9 Jackson Gibbs – sophomore (6'1, 195); 10 Tanner Wilson – sophomore (6'2, 225); 12 Zac Thomas – junior (6'1, 210); 15 David Baldwin-Griffin – freshman (6'4, 230); Running back: 3 Darrynton Evans – junior (5'11, 200); 4 Daetrich Harrington – sophomore (6'0, 195); 6 Camerun Peoples – (redshirt) freshman (6'2, 210); 22 Raykwon Anderson – freshman (5'9, 180); 24 Ben Williams – freshman (5'10, 185); 26 Marcus Williams Jr. – junior (5'10, 205); 27 Nakendrick Clark – junior (5'9, 195); 45 Gabe Montgomery – sophomore (5'8, 205); Wide receiver: 2 Corey Sutton – junior (6'3, 200); 5 Thomas Hennigan – junior (6'1, 205); 11 Jalen Virgil – junior (6'1, 210); 13 Keishawn Watson – graduate (5'11, 185); 14 Malik Williams – junior (5'10, 180); 16 Christian Wells – freshman (5'11, 170); 17 Dashaun Davis – freshman (5'9, 160); 20 Sean Horton – freshman (6'1, 185); 21 Dysaun Razzak – (redshirt) freshman (5'7, 155); 35 Elijah Johnson – freshman (5'11, 175); 80 AJ Hall – (redshirt) freshman (6'1, 200); 82 Richard Tucker – (redshirt) freshman (6'0, 180); 83 Jake Henry – sophomore (5'11, 180); 85 Michael Queen – junior (6'1, 200); 89 Chase Eighmy – (redshirt) freshman (6'2, 205); Tight end: 18 Mike Evans – junior (6'3, 240); 81 Miller Gibbs – (redshirt) freshman (6'4, 220); 84 Ricky Kofoed – freshman (6'3, 205); 86 Trey Ross – (redshirt) freshman (6'3, 230); 87 Collin Reed – senior (6'4, 245); 88 Henry Pearson – sophomore (6'3, 245); Placekicker: 16 Ryker Casey – freshman (6'0, 200); 29 John Gliarmis – (redshirt) freshman (5'8, 155); 91 Chandler Staton – junior (5'11, 190)	Offensive Lineman: 50 Joey Cave – graduate (6'4, 300); 51 Baer Hunter – junior (6'2, 285); 54 Lyle Hiers – freshman (6'5, 280); 55 Matt Williams – junior (6'5, 280); 58 Ryan Neuzil – junior (6'3, 285); 60 Noah Hannon – junior (6'1, 265); 63 Ivan Reyes – junior (6'1, 295); 64 Will Hardin – junior (6'2, 300); 65 Gage Blackston – sophomore (6'4, 275); 67 Logan Wright – junior (6'4, 305); 69 Joe Hartung – sophomore (6'3, 270); 70 Cooper Hodges – (redshirt) freshman (6'4, 295); 72 Larry Dowdy – freshman (6'4, 265); 73 Cole Garrison – junior (6'4, 285); 74 Anderson Hardy – (redshirt) freshman (6'6, 275); 75 Victor Johnson – senior (6'5, 295); 76 Cameron Pack – senior (6'4, 250); 77 Josh Headlee – (redshirt) freshman (6'4, 285); 78 Craig McFarland – freshman (6'6, 280); 79 Sammy Henderson – freshman (6'5, 275); Defensive Lineman: 30 Zareon Hayes – (redshirt) freshman (6'1, 235); 36 Brock Mattison – (redshirt) freshman (6'1, 225); 42 Harrison Taylor – (redshirt) freshman (6'4, 234); 43 Hansky Paillant – (redshirt) freshman (6'2, 240); 46 Chris Washington – (redshirt) freshman (5'11, 270); 48 Demetrius Taylor – junior (6'1, 275); 57 Elijah Diarrassouba – junior (6'1, 255); 66 Will Israel – sophomore (6'2, 235); 68 Greg Johnston – sophomore (6'3, 275); 89 Dorian Pickett – (redshirt) freshman (6'2, 235); 90 Chris Willis – junior (6'2, 260); 91 Tommy Dawkins – junior (6'2, 240); 94 Luke Smith – freshman (6'1, 270); 95 George Blackstock – sophomore (6'1, 260); 96 Markell Clark – junior (6'0, 275); 97 Caleb Spurlin – junior (5'10, 260); 98 E.J. Scott – senior (6'3, 275); 99 Jordon Earle – (redshirt) freshman (6'2, 295); Punter: 30 Clayton Howell – sophomore (6'0, 195); 39 Xavier Subotsch – junior (6'1, 195)	Linebacker: 10 Tim Frizzell – junior (6'1, 230); 20 Noel Cook – senior (6'0, 215); 22 Jace Frisbee – sophomore (6'2, 210); 24 Akeem Davis-Gaither – senior (6'2, 215); 27 Matthew McQuinn – sophomore (6'0, 210); 28 KeSean Brown – freshman (6'2, 210); 29 Brendan Harrington – freshman (6'1, 215); 31 Nick Hampton – (redshirt) freshman (6'3, 210); 33 Jordan Mitchell – (redshirt) freshman (6'0, 225); 34 Jourdan Heilig – freshman (6'2, 215); 37 Tanner Ellenberger – sophomore (6'3, 225); 40 Logan Doublin – sophomore (6'0, 220); 44 T.D. Roof – junior (5'11, 220); 45 Trey Cobb – sophomore (6'2, 220); 47 Colin Guetensberger – freshman (6'0, 200); 49 Blythe Hall – junior (6'2, 210); 51 Tyler Bird – sophomore (6'2, 220); 52 D'Marco Jackson – sophomore (6'1, 220); 58 Grant Daley – freshman (6'2, 210); 59 Jordan Fehr – senior (6'3, 230); Defensive back: 2 Willie Edwards – graduate (6'1, 190); 3 Shaun Jolly – sophomore (5'9, 175); 6 Desmond Franklin – senior (6'0, 205); 7 Josh Thomas – senior (6'0, 205); 8 Shemar Jean-Charles – junior (5'11, 180); 11 Jeremy Level – junior (6'1, 210); 12 Steven Jones Jr. – sophomore (5'10, 180); 13 Kaiden Smith – junior (6'1, 200); 14 Bailey Watts – freshman (6'1, 180); 15 Tre Caldwell – freshman (5'10, 185); 18 Milan Tucker – freshman (5'11, 170); 19 Mike Price – (redshirt) freshman (5'10, 190); 21 Ryan Huff – sophomore (6'1, 200); 25 Kaleb Dawson – (redshirt) freshman (5'11, 190); 26 Nicholas Ross – freshman (5'10, 175); 35 Emmanuel Jenkins – freshman (6'2, 185); 39 Jackson Greene – freshman (5'11, 180); 39 Zion Madden – (redshirt) freshman (5'10, 157); Long snappers: 41 Reed Harper – freshman (5'11, 200); 42 Christian Johnstone – freshman (6'3, 245); 53 Jake Appling – junior (6'3, 275)

== Schedule ==
Date	Time	Opponent	Rank	Site	TV	Result	Attendance
August 31	3:30 p.m.	East Tennessee State*		Kidd Brewer Stadium; Boone, NC	ESPN+	W 42–7	25,147
September 7	3:30 p.m.	Charlotte*		Kidd Brewer Stadium; Boone, NC	ESPN+	W 56–41	29,182
September 21	3:30 p.m.	at North Carolina*		Kenan Memorial Stadium; Chapel Hill, NC	ACCRSN	W 34–31	50,500
September 28	3:30 p.m.	Coastal Carolina		Kidd Brewer Stadium; Boone, NC	ESPN+	W 56–37	25,055
October 9	8:00 p.m.	at Louisiana		Cajun Field; Lafayette, LA	ESPN2	W 17–7	21,012
October 19	3:30 p.m.	Louisiana–Monroe^{†}	No. 24	Kidd Brewer Stadium; Boone, NC	ESPN+	W 52–7	27,717
October 26	Noon	at South Alabama	No. 21	Ladd–Peebles Stadium; Mobile, AL	ESPNU	W 30–3	17,969
October 31	8:00 p.m.	Georgia Southern	No. 20	Kidd Brewer Stadium; Boone, NC (rivalry)	ESPNU	L 21–24	18,796
November 9	7:00 p.m.	at South Carolina*		Williams–Brice Stadium; Columbia, SC	ESPN2	W 20–15	80,849
November 16	7:30 p.m.	at Georgia State	No. 25	Georgia State Stadium; Atlanta, GA	ESPNU	W 56–27	17,309
November 23	2:30 p.m.	Texas State	No. 24	Kidd Brewer Stadium; Boone, NC	ESPN+	W 35–13	22,125
November 29	6:00 p.m.	at Troy	No. 25	Veterans Memorial Stadium; Troy, AL	ESPN+	W 48–13	18,989
December 7	Noon	Louisiana	No. 21	Kidd Brewer Stadium; Boone, NC (Sun Belt Championship)	ESPN	W 45–38	18,618
December 21	9:00 p.m.	vs. UAB*	No. 20	Mercedes-Benz Superdome; New Orleans, LA (New Orleans Bowl)	ESPN	W 31–17	21,202
*Non-conference game; ^{†}Homecoming; Rankings from AP Poll and CFP Rankings after November 5 released prior to game; All times are in Eastern time

Schedule Source:

== Game summaries ==
=== East Tennessee State ===
East Tennessee State at Appalachian State – Game summary

Quarter	1	2	3	4	Total
East Tennessee State	0	0	7	0	7
App State	7	7	14	14	42

at Kidd Brewer Stadium, Boone, North Carolina

- Date: August 31
- Game time: 3:30 p.m. EDT
- Game weather: 78 °F (26 °C); sunny, clear
- Game attendance: 25,147
- Referee: Kyle Olson
- Box Score

Game information

First quarter

- APP – Zac Thomas 1 yd run (C. Staton kick), 2:58 (APP 0–7)

Second quarter

- APP – Malik Williams 6 yd pass from Zac Thomas (Staton kick), 6:06 (APP 0–14)

Third quarter

- APP – Darrynton Evans 13 yd run (Staton kick), 11:35 (APP 0–21)
- ETSU – Nate Adkins 5 yd pass from Trey Mitchell (Tyler Keltner kick), 4:35 (APP 7–21)
- APP – Thomas Hennigan 31 yd pass from Zac Thomas (Staton kick), 0:51 (APP 7–28)

Fourth quarter

- APP – Jalen Virgil 15 yd run (Staton kick), 9:34 (APP 7–35)
- APP – C. Wells 17 yd pass from Jacob Huesman (Staton kick), 5:52 (APP 7–42)

Top passers

- ETSU – Trey Mitchell – 12/19, 117 yards, TD
- APP – Zac Thomas – 16/24, 150 yards, 2 TD

Top rushers

- ETSU – Quay Holmes – 19 carries, 68 yards
- APP – Darrynton Evans– 14 carries, 99 yards, TD

Top receivers

- ETSU – B. Richburg – 4 receptions, 77 yards
- APP – Thomas Hennigan – 7 receptions, 79 yards, TD

Top defenders

- ETSU – Artevius Smith – 11 tackles
- APP – Desmond Franklin – 7 tackles
- APP – Akeem Davis-Gaither – 7 tackles, 1 tackle-for-loss

=== Charlotte ===
Charlotte at Appalachian State – Game summary

Quarter	1	2	3	4	Total
Charlotte	6	7	15	13	41
App State	14	14	14	14	56

at Kidd Brewer Stadium, Boone, North Carolina

- Date: September 7
- Game time: 3:30 p.m. EDT
- Game weather: 73 °F (23 °C); partly cloudy
- Game attendance: 29,182
- Referee: Jeremy Parker
- Box Score

Game information

First quarter

- APP – Darrynton Evans 87 yd run (C. Staton kick), 14:43 (APP 0–7)
- CHL – Benny Lemay 3 yd run (Jonathan Cruz kick failed), 7:50 (APP 6–7)
- APP – Thomas Hennigan 5 yd pass from Zac Thomas (Staton kick), 2:46 (APP 7–14)

Second quarter

- CHL – Benny Lemay 58 yd run (Cruz kick), 13:16 (APP 13–14)
- APP – Jalen Virgil 10 yd pass from Zac Thomas (Staton kick), 1:14 (APP 13–21)
- APP – D'Marco Jackson 16 yd blocked punt return (C. Staton kick), 0:39 (APP 13–28)

Third quarter

- CHL – Cameron Dollar 24 yd pass from Chris Reynolds (Cruz kick), 12:10 (APP 20–28)
- APP – D. Evans 3 yd run (Staton kick), 8:05 (APP 20–35)
- APP – Jalen Virgil 73 yd pass from Zac Thomas (Staton kick), 3:00 (APP 20–42)
- CHL – Benny Lemay 5 yd pass from Chris Reynolds (Victor Tucker pass), 1:00 (APP 28–42)

Fourth quarter

- CHL – Victor Tucker 23 yd pass from Chris Reynolds (Reynolds pass failed), 8:20 (APP 34–42)
- APP – D. Evans 68 yd run (Staton kick), 7:14 (APP 34–49)
- CHL – Victor Tucker 27 yd pass from Chris Reynolds (Cruz kick), 3:17 (APP 41–49)
- APP – D. Evans 45 yd kickoff return (Staton kick), 3:10 (APP 41–56)

Top passers

- CHL – Chris Reynolds – 20/31, 296 yards, 4 TD, INT
- APP – Zac Thomas – 14/20, 182 yards, 3 TD

Top rushers

- CHL – Benny Lemay – 14 carries, 118 yards, 2 TD
- APP – Darrynton Evans – 19 carries, 234 yards, 3 TD

Top receivers

- CHL – M. Elder – 7 receptions, 119 yards
- CHL – Victor Tucker – 6 receptions, 90 yards, 2 TD
- APP – Jalen Virgil – 3 receptions, 86 yards, 2 TD
- APP – Malik Williams – 6 receptions, 73 yards

Top defenders

- CHL – Jeff Gemmell – 9 tackles, 1 tackle-for-loss
- APP – Akeem Davis-Gaither – 9 tackles, 1 sack

=== At North Carolina ===
Appalachian State at North Carolina – Game summary

Quarter	1	2	3	4	Total
App State	13	14	7	0	34
North Carolina	7	10	7	7	31

at Kenan Memorial Stadium, Chapel Hill, NC

- Date: September 21
- Game time: 3:35 p.m. EDT
- Game weather: 87 °F (31 °C); Sunny
- Game attendance: 50,500
- Referee: Jason Autrey
- Box Score

Game information

First quarter

- UNC – Dazz Newsome 21 yd pass from Sam Howell (N. Ruggles kick), 14:43 (UNC 0–7)
- APP – C. Staton 31 yd field goal, 11:06 (UNC 3–7)
- APP – C. Staton 43 yd field goal, 4:42 (UNC 6–7)
- APP – Demetrius Taylor 20 yd fumble recovery (Staton kick), 3:39 (APP 13–7)

Second quarter

- APP – Darrynton Evans 5 yd run (Staton kick), 12:29 (APP 20–7)
- UNC – N. Ruggles 25 yd field goal, 6:57 (APP 20–10)
- APP – D. Evans 2 yd run (Staton kick), 2:56 (APP 27–10)
- UNC – Michael Carter 11 yd pass from S. Howell (N. Ruggles kick), 0:01 (APP 27–17)

Third quarter

- UNC – Carl Tucker 12 yd pass from S. Howell (N. Ruggles kick), 4:18 (APP 27–24)
- APP – D. Evans 3 yd run (Staton kick), 2:11 (APP 34–24)

Fourth quarter

- UNC – S. Howell 2 yd run (N. Ruggles kick), 3:01 (APP 34–31)

Top passers

- APP – Zac Thomas – 20/29, 224 yards, INT
- UNC – Sam Howell – 27/41, 323 yards, 3 TD, 2 INT

Top rushers

- APP – Darrynton Evans – 19 carries, 78 yards, 3 TD
- UNC – Javonte Williams – 16 carries, 94 yards

Top receivers

- APP – Thomas Hennigan – 6 receptions, 90 yards
- UNC – Dazz Newsome – 6 receptions, 88 yards, TD

Top defenders

- APP – Jordan Fehr – 16 tackles, 1 tackle-for-loss
- APP – Akeem Davis-Gaither – 10 tackles, 1 INT
- UNC – Myles Dorn – 12 tackles

=== Coastal Carolina ===
Coastal Carolina at Appalachian State – Game summary

Quarter	1	2	3	4	Total
Coastal Carolina	14	7	9	7	37
App State	14	21	7	14	56

at Kidd Brewer Stadium, Boone, North Carolina

- Date: September 28
- Game time: 3:30 p.m. EDT
- Game weather: 74 °F (23 °C); Cloudy
- Game attendance: 25,055
- Referee: Marshall Lewis
- Box Score

Game information

First quarter

- CCU – F. Payton 6 yd run (M. Biscardi kick), 10:01 (CCU 7–0)
- APP – D. Evans 8 yd run (C. Staton kick), 7:36 (TIED 7–7)
- APP – Collin Reed 11 yd pass from Zac Thomas (Staton kick), 6:27 (APP 7–14)
- CCU – C. J. Marable 42 yd run (M. Biscardi kick), 0:23 (TIED 14–14)

Second quarter

- APP – D. Evans 1 yd run (Staton kick), 9:15 (APP 14–21)
- CCU – Isaiah Likely 14 yd pass from F. Payton (Biscardi kick), 3:52 (TIED 21–21)
- APP – M. Williams 1 yd run (Staton kick), 1:59 (APP 21–28)
- APP – Corey Sutton 15 yd pass from Zac Thomas (Staton kick), 0:45 (APP 21–35)

Third quarter

- APP – D. Harrington 22 yd run (Staton kick), 8:33 (APP 21–42)
- CCU – Biscardi 32 yd field goal, 1:56 (APP 24–42)
- CCU – F. Payton 11 yd run (Payton pass failed), 0:49 (APP 30–42)

Fourth quarter

- APP – Shaun Jolly 24 yd interception (Staton kick), 11:59 (APP 30–49)
- APP – M. Williams 2 yd run (Staton kick), 3:55 (APP 30–56)
- CCU – J. Miller 14 yd pass from F. Payton (Biscardi kick), 0:27 (APP 37–56)

Top passers

- CCU – F. Payton – 20/31, 240 yards, 2 TD, INT
- APP – Zac Thomas – 19/23, 246 yards, 2 TD, INT

Top rushers

- CCU – C. J. Marable – 16 carries, 95 yards, TD
- APP – D. Harrington – 11 carries, 71 yards, TD
- APP – Darrynton Evans – 15 carries, 60 yards, 2 TD

Top receivers

- CCU – Jaivon Heiligh – 6 receptions, 85 yards
- APP – Thomas Hennigan – 5 receptions, 89 yards
- APP – Corey Sutton – 5 receptions, 76 yards, TD

Top defenders

- CCU – T. Gallagher – 10 tackles, 1 tackle-for-loss
- APP – Akeem Davis-Gaither – 8 tackles, 1 sack

=== At Louisiana ===
Appalachian State Mountaineers at Louisiana Ragin' Cajuns

Quarter	1	2	3	4	Total
App State	7	0	3	7	17
Louisiana	0	7	0	0	7

at Cajun Field, Lafayette, LA

- Date: October 9
- Game time: 8:05 p.m. EDT
- Game weather: Temperature: 83 °F (28 °C) • Wind: S 4 mph • Weather: Clear
- Game attendance: 21,012
- Referee: Kyle Olson
- TV announcers (ESPN2): Clay Matvick (play-by-play) & Ryan Leaf (analyst)
- ESPN – App State tops ULL 17–7 in rematch of Sun Belt title game /// Box Score, Appalachian State at Louisiana /// Pregame Notes /// Postgame Notes

Game information

First quarter

- (05:05) APP TD – Zac Thomas 7-yard rush, Chandler Staton kick
  Drive: 7 plays, 95 yards, 2:58; Appalachian State 7–0

Second quarter

- (00:08) LA TD – Nick Ralston 14-yard pass from Levi Lewis, Stevie Artigue kick
  Drive: 10 plays, 94 yards, 3:55; Tied 7–7

Third quarter

- (05:26) APP FG – Chandler Staton 40-yard field goal
  Drive: 11 plays, 52 yards, 4:52; Appalachian State 10–7

Fourth quarter

- (01:55) APP TD – Zac Thomas 7-yard rush, Chandler Staton kick
  Drive: 19 plays, 97 yards, 10:11; Appalachian State 17–7

Top passers

- APP – Zac Thomas: 11/17, 147 yards
- LA – Levi Lewis: 13/24, 131 yards, 1 TD

Top rushers

- APP – Darrynton Evans: 22 carries, 69 yards
- LA – Elijah Mitchell: 13 carries, 68 yards

Top receivers

- APP – Corey Sutton: 2 receptions, 58 yards
- LA – Jarrod Jackson: 5 receptions, 68 yards

Top defenders

- APP – Akeem Davis-Gaither: 10 total tackles (5 solo, 5 assisted), 2.5 TFL, 0.5 sacks
- LA – Jacques Boudreaux: 10 total tackles (3 solo, 7 assisted), 0.5 TFL, 1 PBU

=== Louisiana–Monroe ===
Louisiana–Monroe at Appalachian State – Game summary

Quarter	1	2	3	4	Total
Louisiana–Monroe	7	0	0	0	7
No. 24 App State	21	10	7	14	52

at Kidd Brewer Stadium, Boone, North Carolina

- Date: October 19
- Game time: 3:30 p.m. EDT
- Game weather: 50 °F (10 °C); Rainy
- Game attendance: 27,717
- Referee: Marshall Lewis
- TV: ESPN+
- Box Score

Game information

First quarter

- ULM – Kayin White 1 yd run (Jared Porter kick), 11:09 (ULM 7–0)
- APP – Darrynton Evans 59 yd run (C. Staton kick), 10:28 (TIED 7–7)
- APP – T. Hennigan 6 yd pass from Zac Thomas (Staton kick), 4:46 (APP 7–14)
- APP – Z. Thomas 1 yd run (Staton kick), 1:19 (APP 7–21)

Second quarter

- APP – C. Staton 27 yd field goal, 11:14 (APP 7–24)
- APP – Collin Reed 1 yd pass from Zac Thomas (Staton kick), 1:19 (APP 7–31)

Third quarter

- APP – D. Evans 15 yd pass from Zac Thomas (Staton kick), 9:06 (APP 7–38)

Fourth quarter

- APP – M. Williams 1 yd run (Staton kick), 12:21 (APP 7–45)
- APP – Jalen Virgil 56 yd pass from Jacob Huesman (Staton kick), 6:56 (APP 7–52)

Top passers

- APP – Zac Thomas – 18/30, 214 yards, 3 TD, INT
- ULM – Caleb Evans – 9/19, 75 yards, INT

Top rushers

- APP – Darrynton Evans – 17 carries, 136 yards, TD
- ULM – Josh Johnson – 13 carries, 77 yards

Top receivers

- APP – Corey Sutton – 5 receptions, 75 yards
- ULM – Zach Jackson – 2 receptions, 33 yards

Top defenders

- APP – Noel Cook – 8 tackles
- ULM – Tyler Glass – 9 tackles

=== At South Alabama ===
Appalachian State at South Alabama – Game summary

Quarter	1	2	3	4	Total
No. 21 App State	7	6	10	7	30
South Alabama	0	0	0	3	3

at Ladd–Peebles Stadium, Mobile, AL

- Date: October 26
- Game time: 11:00 a.m. EDT
- Game weather: 74 °F (23 °C); overcast, wet
- Game attendance: 17,969
- Referee: Jeremy Parker
- Box Score

Game information

First quarter

- APP – T. Hennigan 19 yd pass from Zac Thomas (C. Staton kick), 7:06 (APP 7–0)

Second quarter

- APP – C. Staton 19 yd field goal, 12:15 (APP 10–0)
- APP – Staton 34 yd field goal, 1:09 (APP 13–0)

Third quarter

- APP – M. Williams 3 yd run (Staton kick), 8:03 (APP 20–0)
- APP – C. Staton 46 yd field goal, 3:45 (APP 23–0)

Fourth quarter

- USA – Frankie Onate 37 yd field goal, 5:43 (APP 23–3)
- APP – R. Anderson 67 yd run (Staton kick), 4:48 (APP 30–3)

Top passers

- APP – Zac Thomas – 16/28, 132 yards, TD
- USA – Desmond Trotter – 3/8, 43 yards

Top rushers

- APP – R. Anderson – 4 carries, 99 yards, TD
- USA – Tra Minter – 23 carries, 94 yards

Top receivers

- APP – T. Hennigan – 6 receptions, 58 yards, TD
- USA – Cade Sutherland – 1 receptions, 30 yards

Top defenders

- APP – Noel Cook – 7 tackles, 1 sack
- USA – Keith Gallmon – 10 tackles

=== Georgia Southern ===
Georgia Southern at Appalachian State – Game summary

Quarter	1	2	3	4	Total
Georgia Southern	7	3	14	0	24
No. 20 App State	0	7	0	14	21

at Kidd Brewer Stadium, Boone, North Carolina

- Date: October 31
- Game time: 8:00 p.m. EDT
- Game weather: 40 °F (4 °C); rain, wind
- Game attendance: 18,796
- Referee: Wayne Winkler
- TV: ESPNU
- Box Score

Game information

First quarter

- GS – W. Kennedy III 2 yd run (Tyler Bass kick), 4:03 (GS 7–0)

Second quarter

- GS – Bass 49 yd field goal, 11:45 (GS 10–0)
- APP – Malik Williams 15 yd pass from Zac Thomas (C. Staton kick), 0:06 (GS 10–7)

Third quarter

- GS – Kennedy III 68 yd run (Bass kick), 13:22 (GS 17–7)
- GS – S. Werts 55 yd run (Bass kick), 10:35 (GS 24–7)

Fourth quarter

- APP – Corey Sutton 10 yd pass from Zac Thomas (Staton kick), 8:22 (GS 24–14)
- APP – Corey Sutton 9 yd pass from Zac Thomas (Staton kick), 4:47 (GS 24–21)

Top passers

- GS – S. Werts – 1/4, 16 yards
- APP – Zac Thomas – 25/51, 271 yards, 3 TD

Top rushers

- GS – W. Kennedy III – 13 carries, 145 yards, 2 TD
- APP – Darrynton Evans – 17 carries, 76 yards

Top receivers

- GS – M. Michaud – 1 receptions, 16 yards
- APP – Malik Williams – 8 receptions, 90 yards, TD

Top defenders

- GS – K. Duncan Jr. – 11 tackles
- APP – Akeem Davis-Gaither – 16 tackles, 1.5 tackle-for-loss

=== At South Carolina ===
Appalachian State at South Carolina – Game summary

Quarter	1	2	3	4	Total
App State	3	10	7	0	20
South Carolina	6	0	3	6	15

at Williams–Brice Stadium, Columbia, SC

- Date: November 9
- Game time: 7:10 p.m. EDT
- Game weather: 43 °F (6 °C); clear
- Game attendance: 80,849
- Referee: Lee Hedrick
- Box Score

Game information

First quarter

- USC – Parker White 41 yd field goal, 8:51 (USC 0–3)
- APP – C. Staton 40 yd field goal, 5:10 (TIED 3–3)
- USC – White 25 yd field goal, 1:22 (USC 3–6)

Second quarter

- APP – Staton 47 yd field goal, 8:29 (TIED 6–6)
- APP – Nicholas Ross 20 yd interception (Staton kick), 1:51 (APP 13–6)

Third quarter

- USC – White 50 yd field goal, 11:08 (APP 13–9)
- APP – Zac Thomas 1 yd run (Staton kick), 7:10 (APP 20–9)

Fourth quarter

- USC – Bryan Edwards 23 yd pass from Ryan Hilinski (Hilinski pass failed), 2:58 (APP 20–15)

Top passers

- APP – Zac Thomas – 9/15, 105 yards, INT
- USC – Ryan Hilinski – 32/57 325 yards, TD, INT

Top rushers

- APP – Darrynton Evans – 23 carries, 85 yards
- USC – Dakereon Joyner – 3 carries, 14 yards

Top receivers

- APP – Corey Sutton – 3 receptions, 38 yards
- USC – Bryan Edwards – 9 receptions, 90 yards, TD

Top defenders

- APP – Jordan Fehr – 12 tackles, 1 sack
- USC – Ernest Jones – 10 tackles, 1 sack, 1 INT

=== At Georgia State ===
Appalachian State at Georgia State – Game summary

Quarter	1	2	3	4	Total
No. 25 App State	14	21	7	14	56
Georgia State	21	0	0	6	27

at Georgia State Stadium, Atlanta, GA

- Date: November 16
- Game time: 7:32 p.m. EDT
- Game weather: 53 °F (12 °C); clear
- Game attendance: 17,908
- Referee: Jason Autry
- Box Score

Game information

First quarter

- GSU – Devin Gentry 4 yd pass from Dan Ellington (Brandon Wright kick), 8:20 (GSU 0–7)
- APP – Corey Sutton 12 yd pass from Zac Thomas (C. Staton kick), 5:13 (TIED 7–7)
- GSU – Destin Coates 67 yd run (Wright kick), 2:21 (GSU 7–14)
- GSU – Chris Bacon 34 yd interception (Wright kick), 1:38 (GSU 7–21)
- APP – Corey Sutton 20 yd pass from Zac Thomas (Staton kick), 0:09 (GSU 14–21)

Second quarter

- APP – Z. Thomas 3 yd run (Staton kick), 6:20 (TIED 21–21)
- APP – Shaun Jolly 30 yd interception (Staton kick), 2:18 (APP 28–21)
- APP – Darrynton Evans 1 yd pass from Zac Thomas (Staton kick), 0:22 (APP 35–21)

Third quarter

- APP – D. Evans 29 yd run (Staton kick), 5:58 (APP 42–21)

Fourth quarter

- APP – Corey Sutton 24 yd pass from Zac Thomas (Staton kick), 14:55 (APP 49–21)
- APP – R. Anderson 5 yd run (Staton kick), 11:04 (APP 56–21)
- GSU – Tucker Gregg 20 yd run (Barry Brown kick failed), 5:35 (APP 56–27)

Top passers

- APP – Zac Thomas – 19/31, 256 yards, 4 TD, INT
- GSU – Dan Ellington – 12/27 88 yards, TD, 2 INT

Top rushers

- APP – Darrynton Evans – 18 carries, 131 yards, TD
- GSU – Destin Coates – 7 carries, 97 yards, TD

Top receivers

- APP – Corey Sutton – 8 receptions, 173 yards, 3 TD
- GSU – Devin Gentry – 4 receptions, 32 yards, TD

Top defenders

- APP – Jordan Fehr – 10 tackles, 2 tackles-for-loss
- GSU – Jaylon Jones – 8 tackles, 1 tackle-for-loss

=== Texas State ===
Texas State at Appalachian State – Game summary

Quarter	1	2	3	4	Total
Texas State	0	10	3	0	13
No. 24 App State	7	7	14	7	35

at Kidd Brewer Stadium, Boone, North Carolina

- Date: November 23
- Game time: 2:30 p.m. EDT
- Game weather: 44 °F (7 °C); rain and cold
- Game attendance: 22,125
- Referee: Kyle Olson
- TV: ESPN+
- Box Score

Game information

First quarter

- APP – Corey Sutton 45 yd pass from Zac Thomas (C. Staton kick), 7:09 (APP 0–7)

Second quarter

- TXST – Joshua Rowland 48 yd field goal, 12:43 (APP 3–7)
- APP – K. Wilson 19 yd pass from Zac Thomas (Staton kick), 1:00 (APP 3–14)
- TXST – Javen Banks 53 yd pass from Tyler Vitt (Rowland kick), 0:03 (APP 10–14)

Third quarter

- TXST – Joshua Rowland 48 yd field goal, 9:05 (APP 13–14)
- APP – Darrynton Evans 13 yd run (Staton kick), 5:32 (APP 13–21)
- APP – D. Evans 10 yd run (Staton kick), 0:00 (APP 13–28)

Fourth quarter

- APP – D. Evans 13 yd run (Staton kick), 6:26 (APP 13–35)

Top passers

- TXST – Tyler Vitt – 18/34, 154 yards, TD, INT
- APP – Zac Thomas – 8/16, 174 yards, 2 TD

Top rushers

- TXST – Robert Brown Jr – 8 carries, 35 yards
- APP – Darrynton Evans – 21 carries, 154 yards, 3 TD

Top receivers

- TXST – Javen Banks – 5 receptions, 82 yards, TD
- APP – Thomas Hennigan – 2 receptions, 70 yards

Top defenders

- TXST – Nikolas Daniels – 11 tackles, 0.5 tackle-for-loss
- APP – Josh Thomas – 7 tackles, 1 tackle-for-loss

=== At Troy ===
Appalachian State at Troy – Game summary

Quarter	1	2	3	4	Total
No. 25 App State	20	14	7	7	48
Troy	10	3	0	0	13

at Veterans Memorial Stadium, Troy, AL

- Date: November 30
- Game time: 5:05 p.m. EDT
- Game weather: 63 °F (17 °C); clear
- Game attendance: 18,989
- Referee: Marshall Lewis
- Box Score

Game information

First quarter

- TROY – Tyler Sumpter 26 yd field goal, 12:01 (TROY 0–3)
- APP – Jalen Virgil 44 yd pass from Zac Thomas (C. Staton kick failed), 10:10 (APP 6–3)
- APP – Darrynton Evans 52 yd run (Staton kick), 6:25 (APP 13–3)
- APP – Zac Thomas 5 yd run (Staton kick), 5:37 (APP 20–3)
- TROY – DK Billingsley 1 yd run (Sumpter kick), 1:13 (APP 20–10)

Second quarter

- APP – Malik Williams 8 yd pass from Zac Thomas (C. Staton kick), 12:40 (APP 27–10)
- APP – D. Evans 9 yd run (Staton kick), 8:49 (APP 34–10)
- TROY – T. Sumpter 39 yd field goal, 5:33 (APP 34–13)

Third quarter

- APP – M. Williams 6 yd pass from Zac Thomas (C. Staton kick), 9:14 (APP 41–13)

Fourth quarter

- APP – D. Evans 25 yd pass from Zac Thomas (C. Staton kick), 14:54 (APP 48–13)

Top passers

- APP – Zac Thomas – 28/34, 326 yards, 4 TD, INT
- TROY – Kaleb Barker – 24/41 281 yards, INT

Top rushers

- APP – Darrynton Evans – 13 carries, 82 yards, 2 TD
- TROY – Jamontez Woods – 4 carries, 22 yards

Top receivers

- APP – Thomas Hennigan – 11 receptions, 140 yards
- TROY – Reggie Todd – 5 receptions, 82 yards

Top defenders

- APP – Nick Hampton – 8 tackles, 2 tackles-for-loss, sack
- TROY – Carlton Martial – 13 tackles, 2 tackles-for-loss

=== Sun Belt Championship Game ===
Louisiana Ragin' Cajuns at Appalachian State Mountaineers

Quarter	1	2	3	4	Total
Louisiana	7	10	7	14	38
No. 21 App State	21	14	7	3	45

at Kidd Brewer Stadium, Boone, NC

- Date: December 7
- Game time: Noon EST
- Game weather: Sunny and Clear • Temperature: 45 °F (7 °C) • Wind: Light
- Game attendance: 18,618
- Referee: Jason Autrey
- TV announcers (ESPN): Clay Matvick (play-by-play), Ryan Leaf (analyst), Quint Kessenich (sideline)

Game information

First quarter

- APP – Darrynton Evans 58-yard pass from Zac Thomas (Chandler Staton kick), 13:02 (APP 7–0)
- APP – Darrynton Evans 8-yard rush (Chandler Staton kick), 9:38 (APP 14–0)
- APP – Darrynton Evans 5-yard pass from Zac Thomas (Chandler Staton kick), 1:43 (APP 21–0)
- LA – Peter LeBlanc 37-yard pass from Levi Lewis (Stevie Artigue kick), 0:25 (APP 21–7)

Second quarter

- APP – Marc Williams 29-yard rush (Chandler Staton kick), 13:27 (APP 28–7)
- LA – Elijah Mitchell 1-yard pass from Levi Lewis (Stevie Artigue kick), 8:13 (APP 28–14)
- APP – Daetrich Harrington 25-yard rush (Chandler Staton kick), 4:13 (APP 35–14)
- LA – Stevie Artigue 53-yard field goal, 0:03 (APP 35–17)

Third quarter

- APP – Josh Thomas 16-yard interception returned (Chandler Staton kick), 5:57 (APP 42–17)
- LA – Ja'Marcus Bradley 2-yard pass from Levi Lewis (Stevie Artigue kick), 2:41 (APP 42–24)

Fourth quarter

- APP – Chandler Staton 35-yard field goal, 8:12 (APP 45–24)
- LA – Elijah Mitchell 1-yard rush (Stevie Artigue kick), 4:18 (APP 45–31)
- LA – Peter LeBlanc 38-yard pass from Levi Lewis (Stevie Artigue kick), 1:19 (APP 45–38)

Top passers

- LA – Levi Lewis – 24/46, 354 yards, 4 TD, INT
- APP – Zac Thomas – 9/17, 149 yards, 2 TD

Top rushers

- LA – Elijah Mitchell – 18 carries, 85 yards, TD
- APP – Daetrich Harrington – 9 carries, 89 yards, TD

Top receivers

- LA – Peter LeBlanc – 3 receptions, 118 yards, 2 TD
- APP – Darrynton Evans – 2 receptions, 63 yards, 2 TD

Top defenders

- LA – Jacq Boudreaux – 13 tackles
- APP – Akeem Davis-Gaither – 10 tackles, 0.5 tackle-for-loss

== Rankings ==
Ranking movements Legend: ██ Increase in ranking ██ Decrease in ranking — = Not ranked RV = Received votes
	Week																
Poll	Pre	1	2	3	4	5	6	7	8	9	10	11	12	13	14	15	Final
AP	RV	RV	RV	RV	RV	RV	RV	24	21	20	RV	RV	23	22	20	20	19
Coaches	RV	RV	RV	RV	RV	RV	RV	24	21	19	RV	24	22	22	20	20	18
CFP	Not released										—	25	24	25	21	20	Not released

== Players drafted into the NFL ==
Round	Pick	Player	Position	NFL Club
3	93	Darrynton Evans	RB	Tennessee Titans
4	107	Akeem Davis-Gaither	OLB	Cincinnati Bengals
