= 2018 Sun Belt Conference football season =

- League: NCAA Division I FBS
- Sport: Football
- Duration: August 30, 2018 through January 2019
- Teams: 10
- TV partner(s): ESPN, ESPN3, ESPN+, Cox Sports Television

2019 NFL Draft
- Top draft pick: WR Marcus Green, Louisiana-Monroe
- Picked by: Atlanta Falcons, 203rd overall

Regular Season
- East champions: Appalachian State; Troy
- West champions: Louisiana; Arkansas State

Championship Game
- Champions: Appalachian State
- Runners-up: Louisiana
- Finals MVP: RB Darrynton Evans, App State

Football seasons
- 2017 2019

2018 Sun Belt Conference football standings
	Conf.			Overall
Team	W		L	W		L
East Division
Appalachian State xy$	7	–	1	11	–	2
Troy x	7	–	1	10	–	3
Georgia Southern	6	–	2	10	–	3
Coastal Carolina	2	–	6	5	–	7
Georgia State	1	–	7	2	–	10
West Division
Louisiana xy	5	–	3	7	–	7
Arkansas State x	5	–	3	8	–	5
Louisiana–Monroe	4	–	4	6	–	6
South Alabama	2	–	6	3	–	9
Texas State	1	–	7	3	–	9
Championship: Appalachian State 30, Louisiana 19
$ – Conference champion; x – Division champion/co-champions; y – Championship game participant

The 2018 Sun Belt conference football season began on August 30, 2018, and ended on November 24, 2018. It was a part of the 2018 season of the Football Bowl Subdivision (FBS), the top level of NCAA Division I football. The Sun Belt Conference Football Championship Game was played on December 1, 2018, with Appalachian State winning the inaugural game. The entire schedule was released on February 27.

== Preseason ==
=== Coaches predictions ===
The 2018 preseason coaches football poll was released on July 19, voted from the 10 coaches of the conference. Appalachian State and Arkansas State were chosen to be the finalist for their division, with the Red Wolves predicted to win the first ever Sun Belt Championship Game.

East Division

1. Appalachian State (6 first-place votes)
2. Troy (4)
3. Georgia State
4. Georgia Southern
5. Coastal Carolina

West Division

1. Arkansas State (9)
2. Louisiana–Monroe
3. South Alabama (1)
4. Louisiana
5. Texas State

== Season ==
This will be the first season with 10 teams as the New Mexico State left the conference to become independent and Idaho downgraded to FCS and compete in the Big Sky Conference. The scheduling format for the ten members were reset for the 2018 season. Each member will play eight other members in the conference with four at home and four away. The conference was split up with five teams representing the east and the other five representing the west division. A team will play each team within their division (4 teams) and four from the other division (two at home and two away). South Alabama (west division) and Troy (east) will be the only two teams to play each other every year due to their rivalry and proximity to each other.

== Schedule ==
=== Regular season ===
Index to colors and formatting
Sun Belt member won
Sun Belt member lost
Sun Belt teams in **bold**

==== Week One ====
Date	Time	Visiting team	Home team	Site	TV	Result	Attendance	Ref.
August 30	6:00 p.m.	No. 5 (FCS) Kennesaw State	**Georgia State**	Georgia State Stadium • Atlanta, GA	ESPN+	**W** 24–20	23,088	
August 30	7:00 p.m.	Southeastern Louisiana	**Louisiana–Monroe**	Malone Stadium • Monroe, LA	ESPN+	**W** 34–31	10,137	
September 1	11:00 a.m.	**Coastal Carolina**	South Carolina	Williams–Brice Stadium • Columbia, SC	SECN	**L** 15–49	75,126	
September 1	11:00 a.m.	**Texas State**	Rutgers	High Point Solutions Stadium • Piscataway, NJ	BTN	**L** 7–35	40,124	
September 1	2:30 p.m.	**Appalachian State**	No. 10 Penn State	Beaver Stadium • University Park, PA	BTN	**L** 38–45 ^{OT}	105,232	
September 1	5:00 p.m.	South Carolina State	**Georgia Southern**	Paulson Stadium • Statesboro, GA	ESPN+	**W** 37–6	15,260	
September 1	5:00 p.m.	No. 22 Boise State	**Troy**	Veterans Memorial Stadium • Troy, AL	ESPNews	**L** 20–56	29,612	
September 1	5:00 p.m.	Grambling State	**Louisiana**	Cajun Field • Lafayette, LA	ESPN3	**W** 49–17	28,866	
September 1	6:00 p.m.	Southeast Missouri State	**Arkansas State**	Centennial Bank Stadium • Jonesboro, AR	ESPN+	**W** 48–21	20,184	
September 1	6:00 p.m.	Louisiana Tech	**South Alabama**	Ladd–Peebles Stadium • Mobile, AL	ESPN+	**L** 26–30	13,457	
^{#}Rankings from AP Poll released prior to game. All times are in Central Time.

Players of the week:

Offensive		Defensive		Special teams	
Player	Team	Player	Team	Player	Team
Justice Hansen	Arkansas State	Tomarcio Reese	Georgia Southern	Darrynton Evans	Appalachian State

==== Week Two ====
Date	Time	Visiting team	Home team	Site	TV	Result	Attendance	Ref.
September 8	11:30 p.m.	**Georgia State**	NC State	Carter–Finley Stadium • Raleigh, NC	ACCRSN	**L** 7–41	56,017	
September 8	2:30 p.m.	**Arkansas State**	No. 1 Alabama	Bryant–Denny Stadium • Tuscaloosa, AL	ESPN2	**L** 7–57	100,495	
September 8	5:00 p.m.	UMass	**Georgia Southern**	Paulson Stadium • Statesboro, GA	ESPN+	**W** 34–13	15,071	
September 8	5:00 p.m.	**Appalachian State**	Charlotte	Jerry Richardson Stadium • Charlotte, NC	ESPN+	**W** 45–19	19,151	
September 8	6:00 p.m.	UAB	**Coastal Carolina**	Brooks Stadium • Conway, SC	ESPN+	**W** 47–24	9,776	
September 8	6:00 p.m.	Florida A&M	**Troy**	Veterans Memorial Stadium • Troy, AL	ESPN+	**W** 59–7	25,767	
September 8	6:00 p.m.	**Louisiana–Monroe**	Southern Miss	M. M. Roberts Stadium • Hattiesburg, MS	ESPN3	**W** 21–20	19,579	
September 8	6:00 p.m.	Texas Southern	**Texas State**	Bobcats Stadium • San Marcos, TX	ESPN3	**W** 36–20	15,440	
September 8	7:00 p.m.	**South Alabama**	Oklahoma State	Boone Pickens Stadium • Stillwater, OK	FSN	**L** 13–55	53,923	
^{#}Rankings from AP Poll released prior to game. All times are in Central Time.

Players of the week:

Offensive		Defensive		Special teams	
Player	Team	Player	Team	Player	Team
Zac Thomas	Appalachian State	Donald Louis Jr.	Louisiana–Monroe	James Sherman	Texas State

==== Week Three ====
Date	Time	Visiting team	Home team	Site	TV	Result	Attendance	Ref.
September 12	2:00 p.m.	**Coastal Carolina**	Campbell	Barker–Lane Stadium • Buies Creek, NC (Note: This game was relocated to Barker–Lane Stadium, the home field of Campbell, and moved to Wednesday September 12 in anticipation of Hurricane Florence.)	ESPN3	**W** 58–21	2,047	
September 14	7:00 p.m.	**Georgia State**	Memphis	Liberty Bowl Memorial Stadium • Memphis, TN	ESPN	**L** 22–59	27,678	
September 15	11:00 a.m.	**Troy**	Nebraska	Memorial Stadium • Lincoln, NE	BTN	**W** 24–19	89,360	
~~September 15~~	~~2:30 p.m.~~	~~Southern Miss~~	~~**Appalachian State**~~	~~Kidd Brewer Stadium~~ • ~~Boone, NC~~	~~ESPN+~~	**Cancelled** (Note: This game has been cancelled in anticipation of Hurricane Florence.)		
September 15	3:30 p.m.	**Georgia Southern**	No. 2 Clemson	Memorial Stadium • Clemson, SC	ESPN2	**L** 7–38	79,844	
September 15	6:00 p.m.	**Arkansas State**	Tulsa	Chapman Stadium • Tulsa, OK	CBSSN	**W** 29–20	17,349	
September 15	6:00 p.m.	**Texas State**	**South Alabama**	Ladd–Peebles Stadium • Mobile, AL	ESPN+	**SOAL** 41–31	16,051	
September 15	6:30 p.m.	**Louisiana**	No. 16 Mississippi State	Davis Wade Stadium • Starkville, MS	ESPN2	**L** 10–56	56,505	
September 15	6:30 p.m.	**Louisiana–Monroe**	Texas A&M	Kyle Field • College Station, TX	SECN	**L** 10–48	96,727	
^{#}Rankings from AP Poll released prior to game. All times are in Central Time.

Players of the week:

Offensive		Defensive		Special teams	
Player	Team	Player	Team	Player	Team
Jamarius Way	South Alabama	Tron Folsom	Troy	Tyler Sumpter	Troy

==== Week Four ====
Date	Time	Visiting team	Home team	Site	TV	Result	Attendance	Ref.
September 22	1:00 p.m.	Western Michigan	**Georgia State**	Georgia State Stadium • Atlanta, GA	ESPN+	**W** 34–15	15,264	
September 22	2:30 p.m.	Gardner–Webb	**Appalachian State**	Kidd Brewer Stadium • Boone, NC	ESPN+	**W** 72–7	21,084	
September 22	6:00 p.m.	**Coastal Carolina**	**Louisiana**	Cajun Field • Lafayette, LA	ESPN+	**CCU** 30–28	17,125	
September 22	6:00 p.m.	**Texas State**	UTSA	Alamodome • San Antonio, TX	ESPN+	**L** 21–25	29,205	
September 22	6:00 p.m.	**Troy**	**Louisiana–Monroe**	Malone Stadium • Monroe, LA	ESPN+	**TROY** 35–27	15,722	
September 22	6:00 p.m.	UNLV	**Arkansas State**	Centennial Bank Stadium • Jonesboro, AR	ESPN3	**W** 27–20	18,537	
September 22	7:00 p.m.	**South Alabama**	Memphis	Liberty Bowl Memorial Stadium • Memphis, TN	ESPN3	**L** 35–52	27,765	
^{#}Rankings from AP Poll released prior to game. All times are in Central Time.

Players of the week:

Offensive		Defensive		Special teams	
Player	Team	Player	Team	Player	Team
Kaleb Barker	Troy	William Bradley-King	Arkansas State	Steven Jones	Appalachian State

==== Week Five ====
Date	Time	Visiting team	Home team	Site	TV	Result	Attendance	Ref.
September 29	11:00 a.m.	**Louisiana**	No. 1 Alabama	Bryant–Denny Stadium • Tuscaloosa, AL	SECN	**L** 14–56	101,471	
September 29	1:00 p.m.	**Louisiana–Monroe**	**Georgia State**	Georgia State Stadium • Atlanta, GA	ESPN+	**GSU** 46–14	14,368	
September 29	2:30 p.m.	**South Alabama**	**Appalachian State**	Kidd Brewer Stadium • Boone, NC	ESPN+	**APST** 52–7	25,862	
September 29	2:30 p.m.	**Coastal Carolina**	**Troy**	Veterans Memorial Stadium • Troy, AL	ESPN3	**TROY** 45–21	23,810	
September 29	5:00 p.m.	**Arkansas State**	**Georgia Southern**	Paulson Stadium • Statesboro, GA	ESPN+	**GASO** 28–21	17,320	
^{#}Rankings from AP Poll released prior to game. All times are in Central Time.

Players of the week:

Offensive		Defensive		Special teams	
Player	Team	Player	Team	Player	Team
Jabir Daughtry-Frye	Troy	Logan Hunt	Georgia Southern	Marcus Jones	Troy

==== Week Six ====
Date	Time	Visiting team	Home team	Site	TV	Result	Attendance	Ref.
October 4	6:30 p.m.	**Georgia State**	**Troy**	Veterans Memorial Stadium • Troy, AL	ESPNU	**TROY** 37–20	22,903	
October 6	2:30 p.m.	**South Alabama**	**Georgia Southern**	Paulson Stadium • Statesboro, GA	ESPN3	**GASO** 48–13	17,622	
October 6	3:00 p.m.	**Louisiana–Monroe**	Ole Miss	Vaught–Hemingway Stadium • Oxford, MS	SECN	**L** 21–70	52,875	
October 6	6:00 p.m.	**Louisiana**	**Texas State**	Bobcat Stadium • San Marcos, TX	ESPN+	**ULL** 42–27	17,062	
^{#}Rankings from AP Poll released prior to game. All times are in Central Time.

Players of the week:

Offensive		Defensive		Special teams	
Player	Team	Player	Team	Player	Team
Elijah Mitchell	Louisiana	Monquavion Brinson	Georgia Southern	Marcus Green	Louisiana–Monroe

==== Week Seven ====
Date	Time	Visiting team	Home team	Site	TV	Result	Attendance	Ref.
October 9	7:00 p.m.	**Appalachian State**	**Arkansas State**	Centennial Bank Stadium • Jonesboro, AR	ESPN2	**APST** 35–9	21,421	
October 11	6:30 p.m.	**Georgia Southern**	**Texas State**	Bobcat Stadium • San Marcos, TX	ESPNU	**GASO** 15–13	9,545	
October 13	1:00 p.m.	**Troy**	Liberty	Williams Stadium • Lynchburg, VA	ESPN3	**L** 16–22	17,389	
October 13	4:00 p.m.	New Mexico State	**Louisiana**	Cajun Field • Lafayette, LA	ESPN+	**W** 66–38	18,131	
October 13	4:00 p.m.	Alabama State	**South Alabama**	Ladd–Peebles Stadium • Mobile, AL	ESPN3	**W** 45–7	16,231	
October 13	5:00 p.m.	**Louisiana–Monroe**	**Coastal Carolina**	Brooks Stadium • Conway, SC	ESPN+	**ULM** 45–20	11,506	
^{#}Rankings from AP Poll released prior to game. All times are in Central Time.

Players of the week:

Offensive		Defensive		Special teams	
Player	Team	Player	Team	Player	Team
Andre Nunez	Louisiana	Jordan Fehr	Appalachian State	Tra Minter	South Alabama

==== Week Eight ====
Date	Time	Visiting team	Home team	Site	TV	Result	Attendance	Ref.
October 18	6:30 p.m.	**Georgia State**	**Arkansas State**	Centennial Bank Stadium • Jonesboro, AR	ESPNU	**ARST** 51–35	18,176	
October 20	2:30 p.m.	**Coastal Carolina**	UMass	McGuirk Stadium • Hadley, MA	ELVN	**W** 24–13	11,134	
October 20	2:30 p.m.	**Louisiana**	**Appalachian State**	Kidd Brewer Stadium • Boone, NC	ESPN+	**APST** 27–17	27,082	
October 20	3:00 p.m.	**Georgia Southern**	New Mexico State	Aggie Memorial Stadium • Las Cruces, NM		**W** 48–31	7,300	
October 20	6:00 p.m.	**Texas State**	**Louisiana–Monroe**	Malone Stadium • Monroe, LA	ESPN3	**ULM** 20–14	13,235	
^{#}Rankings from AP Poll released prior to game. All times are in Central Time.

Players of the week:

Offensive		Defensive		Special teams	
Player	Team	Player	Team	Player	Team
Darrynton Evans; Justice Hansen	Appalachian State; Arkansas State	Tajhea Chambers	Arkansas State	Tyler Bass	Georgia Southern

==== Week Nine ====
Date	Time	Visiting team	Home team	Site	TV	Result	Attendance	Ref.
October 23	7:00 p.m.	**Troy**	**South Alabama**	Ladd–Peebles Stadium • Mobile, AL (rivalry)	ESPN2	**TROY** 38–17	25,878	
October 25	6:30 p.m.	No. 25 **Appalachian State**	**Georgia Southern**	Paulson Stadium • Statesboro, GA (rivalry)	ESPNU	**GASO** 34–14	19,252	
October 27	1:00 p.m.	**Coastal Carolina**	**Georgia State**	Georgia State Stadium • Atlanta, GA	ESPN+	**CCU** 37–34	15,648	
October 27	6:00 p.m.	New Mexico State	**Texas State**	Bobcat Stadium • San Marcos, TX	ESPN3	**W** 27–20	15,045	
October 27	6:00 p.m.	**Arkansas State**	**Louisiana**	Cajun Field • Lafayette, LA	ESPN+	**ULL** 47–43	17,068	
^{#}Rankings from AP Poll released prior to game. All times are in Central Time.

Players of the week:

Offensive		Defensive		Special teams	
Player	Team	Player	Team	Player	Team
Shai Werts	Georgia Southern	Kindle Vildor	Georgia Southern	Kyle Pfau	Louisiana

==== Week Ten ====
Date	Time	Visiting team	Home team	Site	TV	Result	Attendance	Ref.
November 3	1:00 p.m.	**Texas State**	**Georgia State**	Georgia State Stadium • Atlanta, GA	ESPN+	**TXST** 40–31	11,312	
November 3	2:00 p.m.	**Georgia Southern**	**Louisiana–Monroe**	Malone Stadium • Monroe, LA	ESPN3	**ULM** 44–25	13,787	
November 3	2:00 p.m.	**South Alabama**	**Arkansas State**	Centennial Bank Stadium • Jonesboro, AR	ESPN+	**ARST** 38–14	20,671	
November 3	2:30 p.m.	**Louisiana**	**Troy**	Veterans Memorial Stadium • Troy, AL	ESPN+	**TROY** 26–16	24,631	
November 3	4:00 p.m.	**Appalachian State**	**Coastal Carolina**	Brooks Stadium • Conway, SC	ESPN+	**APST** 23–7	13,004	
^{#}Rankings from AP Poll released prior to game. All times are in Central Time.

Players of the week:

Offensive		Defensive		Special teams	
Player	Team	Player	Team	Player	Team
Caleb Evans	Louisiana–Monroe	Jordan Fehr	Appalachian State	Tyler Sumpter	Troy

==== Week Eleven ====
Date	Time	Visiting team	Home team	Site	TV	Result	Attendance	Ref.
November 10	12:00 p.m.	**Troy**	**Georgia Southern**	Paulson Stadium • Statesboro, GA	ESPN+	**TROY** 35–21	16,289	
November 10	3:00 p.m.	**Appalachian State**	**Texas State**	Bobcat Stadium • San Marcos, TX	ESPN3	**APST** 38–7	11,482	
November 10	4:00 p.m.	**Georgia State**	**Louisiana**	Cajun Field • Lafayette, LA	ESPN+	**ULL** 36–22	14,945	
November 10	4:00 p.m.	**Louisiana–Monroe**	**South Alabama**	Ladd–Peebles Stadium • Mobile, AL	ESPN+	**ULM** 38–10	14,096	
November 10	4:00 p.m.	**Arkansas State**	**Coastal Carolina**	Brooks Stadium • Conway, SC	ESPN+	**ARST** 44–16	8,141	
^{#}Rankings from AP Poll released prior to game. All times are in Central Time.

Players of the week:

Offensive		Defensive		Special teams	
Player	Team	Player	Team	Player	Team
Raymond Calais	Louisiana	Antione Barker	Troy	Tyler Sumpter	Troy

==== Week Twelve ====
Date	Time	Visiting team	Home team	Site	TV	Result	Attendance	Ref.
November 17	1:30 p.m.	**Georgia State**	**Appalachian State**	Kidd Brewer Stadium • Boone, NC	ESPN+	**APST** 45–17	22,315	
November 17	2:00 p.m.	**Louisiana–Monroe**	**Arkansas State**	Centennial Bank Stadium • Jonesboro, AR	ESPN+	**ARST** 31–17	20,012	
November 17	2:30 p.m.	**Texas State**	**Troy**	Veterans Memorial Stadium • Troy, AL	ESPN+	**TROY** 12–7	20,437	
November 17	4:00 p.m.	**South Alabama**	**Louisiana**	Cajun Field • Lafayette, LA	ESPN3	**ULL** 48–38	15,168	
November 17	4:00 p.m.	**Georgia Southern**	**Coastal Carolina**	Brooks Stadium • Conway, SC	ESPN+	**GASO** 41–17	9,886	
^{#}Rankings from AP Poll released prior to game. All times are in Central Time.

Players of the week:

Offensive		Defensive		Special teams	
Player	Team	Player	Team	Player	Team
Zac Thomas	Arkansas State	Justin Clifton	Arkansas State	Tyler Sumpter	Troy

==== Week Thirteen ====
Date	Time	Visiting team	Home team	Site	TV	Result	Attendance	Ref.
November 23	2:00 p.m.	**Coastal Carolina**	**South Alabama**	Ladd–Peebles Stadium • Mobile, AL	ESPN+	**SOAL** 31–28	10,670	
November 24	1:00 p.m	**Georgia Southern**	**Georgia State**	Georgia State Stadium • Atlanta, GA (rivalry)	ESPN+	**GASO** 35–14	20,011	
November 24	1:30 p.m.	**Troy**	**Appalachian State**	Kidd Brewer Stadium • Boone, NC	ESPN+	**APST** 21–10	20,410	
November 24	2:00 p.m.	**Louisiana**	**Louisiana–Monroe**	Malone Stadium • Monroe, LA (Battle on the Bayou)	ESPN+	**ULL** 31–28	18,167	
November 24	3:00 p.m.	**Arkansas State**	**Texas State**	Bobcat Stadium • San Marco, TX	ESPN3	**ARST** 33–7	10,115	
^{#}Rankings from AP Poll released prior to game. All times are in Central Time.

Players of the week:

Offensive		Defensive		Special teams	
Player	Team	Player	Team	Player	Team
Tra Minter	South Alabama	Akeem Davis-Gaither	Appalachian State	Justin McInnis	Arkansas State

==== Sun Belt Championship Game ====
Date	Time	Visiting team	Home team	Site	TV	Result	Attendance	Ref.
December 1	11:00 a.m.	**Louisiana**	**Appalachian State**	Kidd Brewer Stadium • Boone, NC	ESPN	**APST** 30–19	14,963	
^{#}Rankings from AP Poll released prior to game. All times are in Central Time.

== Postseason ==
=== Bowl games ===
Legend
Sun Belt win
Sun Belt loss

Bowls based on contractual tie-ins. Actual bowls attended by Sun Belt members may vary and will be announced following the regular season.

Bowl game	Date	Site	Television	Time (CST)	Sun Belt team	Opponent	Score	Attendance
Cure Bowl	December 15	Camping World Stadium • Orlando, FL	CBSSN	1:30 p.m.	Louisiana	Tulane	24–41	19,066
Camellia Bowl	December 15	Cramton Bowl • Montgomery, AL	ESPN	4:30 p.m.	Georgia Southern	Eastern Michigan	23–21	17,710
New Orleans Bowl	December 15	Mercedes-Benz Superdome • New Orleans, LA	ESPN	8:00 p.m.	Appalachian State	Middle Tennessee	45–13	23,942
Dollar General Bowl	December 22	Ladd–Peebles Stadium • Mobile, AL	ESPN	6:00 p.m.	Troy	Buffalo	42–32	31,818
Arizona Bowl	December 29	Arizona Stadium • Tucson, AZ	CBSSN	8:00 p.m.	Arkansas State	Nevada	13–16	32,368

== Awards and honors ==
=== Individual awards ===
- Player of the Year: Justice Hansen, R-Sr., QB, Arkansas State
- Offensive Player of the Year: Zac Thomas, So., QB, Appalachian State
- Defensive Player of the Year: Ronheen Bingham, Sr., DL, Arkansas State
- Freshman of the Year: Marcel Murray, RB, Arkansas State
- Newcomer of the Year: Kirk Merritt, Jr., WR, Arkansas State
- Coach of the Year: Scott Satterfield, Appalachian State

=== All-Conference teams ===
Offense:

Pos.	Name	Yr.	School	Pos.	Name	Yr.	School	Pos.	Name	Yr.	School
First Team				Second Team				Third Team			
QB	Justice Hansen	R-Sr.	Arkansas State	QB	Zac Thomas	So.	Appalachian State	QB	Caleb Evans	Jr.	Louisiana–Monroe
RB	Darrynton Evans	So.	Appalachian State	RB	Elijah Mitchell	So.	Louisiana	RB	Marcel Murray	Fr.	Arkansas State
RB	B.J. Smith	Jr.	Troy	RB	Wesley Fields	Sr.	Georgia Southern	RB	Trey Ragas	So.	Louisiana
WR	Kirk Merritt	Jr.	Arkansas State	WR	Corey Sutton	So.	Appalachian State	WR	Penny Hart	Jr.	Georgia State
WR	Marcus Green	Sr.	Louisiana–Monroe	WR	Justin McInnis	Sr.	Arkansas State	WR	Ja'Marcus Bradley	Jr.	Louisiana
WR	Damion Willis	Sr.	Troy	WR	Jamarius Way	Sr.	South Alabama	WR	Deondre Douglas	Sr.	Troy
TE	Keenen Brown	Sr.	Texas State	TE	Javonis Isaac	So.	Arkansas State	TE	Collin Reed	Jr.	Appalachian State
OL	Victor Johnson	Jr.	Appalachian State	OL	Chandler Greer	Sr.	Appalachian State	OL	Hunter Atkinson	Jr.	Georgia State
OL	Lanard Bonner	Sr.	Arkansas State	OL	Noah Hannon	So.	Appalachian State	OL	T.J. Fiailoa	So.	Louisiana–Monroe
OL	Curtis Rainey	SR.	Georgia Southern	OL	Jeremiah Culbreth	Sr.	Georgia Southern	OL	Bobby Reynolds	Jr.	Louisiana–Monroe
OL	Kevin Dotson	Jr.	Louisiana	OL	Robert Hunt	Jr.	Louisiana	OL	Tristan Crowder	Jr.	Troy
OL	Kirk Kelley	Jr.	Troy	OL	Deontae Crumitie	Sr.	Troy	OL	J.L. Gaston	Jr.	Troy

Defense:

Pos.	Name	Yr.	School	Pos.	Name	Yr.	School	Pos.	Name	Yr.	School
First Team				Second Team				Third Team			
DL	MyQuon Stout	Sr.	Appalachian State	DL	Will Bradley-King	R-So.	Arkansas State	DL	Tarron Jackson	So.	Coastal Carolina
DL	Ronheen Bingham	Sr..	Arkansas State	DL	Forrest Merrill	Jr.	Arkansas State	DL	Logan Hunt	Sr.	Georgia Southern
DL	Jeffrey Gunter	So.	Coastal Carolina	DL	Raymond Johnson	So.	Georgia Southern	DL	Zi'Yon Hill	R-Fr.	Louisiana
DL	Trevon Sanders	Sr.	Troy	DL	Tyree Turner	Jr.	South Alabama	DL	Antione Barker	Jr.	Troy
LB	Jordan Fehr	Jr.	Appalachian State	LB	Akeem Davis-Gaither	Jr.	Appalachian State	LB	Anthony Flory	Sr.	Appalachian State
LB	Bryan London II	Jr.	Texas State	LB	David Griffith	Sr.	Louisiana–Monroe	LB	Jacques Boudreaux	Jr.	Louisiana
LB	Hunter Reese	Sr.	Troy	LB	Bull Barge	Sr.	South Alabama	LB	Nikolas Daniels	Jr.	Texas State
DB	Clifton Duck	Jr.	Appalachian State	DB	Jerry Jacobs	So.	Arkansas State	DB	Tae Hayes	Sr.	Appalachian State
DB	Desmond Franklin	Jr.	Appalachian State	DB	Monquavion Brinson	Jr.	Georgia Southern	DB	Darreon Jackson	R-Jr.	Arkansas State
DB	Justin Clifton	Sr.	Arkansas State	DB	Nigel Lawrence	Sr.	South Alabama	DB	Blace Brown	Sr.	Troy
DB	Kindle Vildor	Jr.	Georgia Southern	DB	Marcus Jones	So.	Troy	DB	Tyler Murray	So.	Troy
DB	Cedarius Rookard	Sr.	Troy								

Special Teams:

Pos.	Name	Yr.	School	Pos.	Name	Yr.	School	Pos.	Name	Yr.	School
First Team				Second Team				Third Team			
PK	Tyler Bass	R-Jr.	Georgia Southern	PK	Tyler Sumpter	So.	Troy	PK	Massimo Biscardi	Fr.	Coastal Carolina
P	Brandon Wright	R-Jr.	Georgia State	P	Cody Grace	Jr.	Arkansas State	P	Tyler Sumpter	So.	Troy
RS	Marcus Jones	So.	Troy	RS	Tra Minter	Jr.	South Alabama	RS	Clifton Duck	Sr.	Appalachian State
AP	Marcus Green	Sr.	Louisiana–Monroe	AP	Tra Minter	Jr.	South Alabama	AP	Darrynton Evans	So.	Appalachian State

Ref:

== Non-conference records ==
=== Power Five conferences ===
Power 5 Conferences	Record
ACC	0–2
Big Ten	0–2
Big 12	1–1
Pac-12	0–0
SEC	0–6
Power 5 Total	1–11

=== Group of Five conferences ===
Group of 5 Conferences	Record
American	1–2
C-USA	3–2
Mountain West	1–1
MAC	1–0
Group of 5 Total	5–4

=== FBS independents ===
FBS Independents	Record
FBS Independents	5–1

=== FCS conferences ===
FCS Opponents	Record
Football Championship Subdivision	10–0

== Home attendance ==
Team	Stadium	Capacity	Game 1	Game 2	Game 3	Game 4	Game 5	Game 6	Total	Average	% of Capacity
Appalachian State	Kidd Brewer Stadium	30,000	21,084	25,862	27,082 †	22,315	20,410		116,753	23,351	77.8%
Arkansas State	Centennial Bank Stadium	30,382	20,184	18,537	21,421 †	18,176	20,671	20,012	119,001	19,834	65.3%
Coastal Carolina	Brooks Stadium	15,000	9,776	11,506	13,004 †	8,141	9,886		52,313	10,463	69.8%
Georgia State	Georgia State Stadium	24,333	23,088 †	15,264	14,368	15,648	11,312	20,011	99,691	16,615	68.3%
Georgia Southern	Paulson Stadium	25,000	15,260	15,071	17,320	17,622	19,252 †	16,289	100,814	16,802	67.2%
Louisiana	Cajun Field	36,900	28,866 †	17,125	18,131	17,068	14,945	15,168	111,303	18,551	50.3%
Louisiana–Monroe	Malone Stadium	30,427	10,137	15,722	13,235	13,787	18,167 †		71,048	14,210	46.7%
South Alabama	Ladd–Peebles Stadium	33,471	13,457	16,051	16,231	25,878 †	14,096	10,670	96,383	16,064	48.0%
Texas State	Bobcat Stadium	30,000	15,440	17,062 †	9,545	15,045	11,482	10,115	78,689	13,115	43.7%
Troy	Veterans Memorial Stadium	30,402	29,612 †	25,767	23,810	22,903	24,631	20,437	147,160	24,527	80.7%

Bold: Exceeded capacity
†Season High

== NFL draft ==
The following list includes all Sun Belt players who were drafted in the 2019 NFL draft.

Round #	Pick #	NFL team	Player	Position	College
6	203	Atlanta Falcons	Marcus Green	WR	Louisiana–Monroe
