= 2019 Sun Belt Conference football season =

2019 Sun Belt Conference Football season
- League: NCAA Division I Football Bowl Subdivision
- Sport: Football
- Duration: August 29, 2019 to January 2020
- Teams: 10

2020 NFL Draft
- Top draft pick: OG Robert Hunt, Louisiana
- Picked by: Miami Dolphins, 39th overall

Regular season
- East champions: Appalachian State
- West champions: Louisiana

Championship Game
- Champions: Appalachian State
- Runners-up: Louisiana
- Finals MVP: RB Darrynton Evans, App State

Seasons
- ← 2018 2020 →

2019 Sun Belt Conference football standings
	Conf.			Overall
Team	W		L	W		L
East Division
No. 19 Appalachian State x$	7	–	1	13	–	1
Georgia Southern	5	–	3	7	–	6
Georgia State	4	–	4	7	–	6
Troy	3	–	5	5	–	7
Coastal Carolina	2	–	6	5	–	7
West Division
Louisiana x	7	–	1	11	–	3
Arkansas State	5	–	3	8	–	5
Louisiana–Monroe	4	–	4	5	–	7
Texas State	2	–	6	3	–	9
South Alabama	1	–	7	2	–	10
Championship: Appalachian State 45, Louisiana 38
$ – Conference champion; x – Division champion/co-champions; Rankings from AP Poll

The 2019 Sun Belt Conference football season was the 18th season of college football play for the Sun Belt Conference. It was played from August 29, 2019, until January 2020. The Sun Belt Conference consists of 10 members in two divisions. It was part of the 2019 NCAA Division I FBS football season.

== Preseason ==
=== Recruiting classes ===
Rankings
Team	ESPN	Rivals	Scout & 24/7	Signees
Appalachian State			101st	18
Arkansas State			95th	24
Coastal Carolina			122nd	27
Georgia Southern			121st	21
Georgia State			98th	22
Louisiana			76th	26
Louisiana–Monroe			128th	20
South Alabama			126th	30
Texas State			133rd	16
Troy			80th	23

=== Sun Belt Media Days ===
Preseason Media polls

The 2019 preseason coaches football poll was released on July 19, voted from the 10 coaches of the conference. Appalachian State and Louisiana were chosen to be the finalist for their division, with the Mountaineers predicted to win the Sun Belt Championship Game.

East Division

1. Appalachian State (7) – 46 pts
2. Troy (1) – 39 pts
3. Georgia Southern (2) – 35 pts
4. Coastal Carolina – 17 pts
5. Georgia State – 13 pts

West Division

1. Louisiana (6) – 46 pts
2. Arkansas State (3) – 42 pts
3. ULM – 27 pts
4. South Alabama (1) – 19 pts
5. Texas State – 16 pts

=== Preseason awards ===
Preseason All-Sun Belt

- Offensive Player of the Year: B.J. Smith (Troy, Senior)
- Defensive Player of the Year: Kindle Vildor (Georgia Southern, Senior)

Position	Player	Team
First Team Offense
WR	Corey Sutton	Appalachian State
WR	Kirk Merrit	Arkansas State
WR	Ja'Marcus Bradley	Louisiana
OL	Noah Hannon	Appalachian State
OL	Victor Johnson	Appalachian State
OL	Kevin Dotson	Louisiana
OL	Robert Hunt	Louisiana
OL	Kirk Kelley	Troy
TE	Javonis Issac	Arkansas State
QB	Zac Thomas	Appalachian State
RB	Darrynton Evans	Appalachian State
RB	B.J. Smith	Troy
First Team Defense
DL	William Bradley-King	Arkansas State
DL	Forrest Merrill	Arkansas State
DL	Tyree Turner	South Alabama
DL	Raymond Johnson	Georgia Southern
LB	Akeem Davis-Gaither	Appalachian State
LB	Jordan Fehr	Appalachian State
LB	Bryan London II	Texas State
CB	Desmond Franklin	Appalachian State
CB	Jerry Jacobs	Arkansas State
CB	Monquavion Brinson	Georgia Southern
CB	Kindle Vildor	Georgia Southern
First Team Special Teams
K	Tyler Bass	Georgia Southern
P	Brandon Wright	Georgia State
RS	Tra Minter	South Alabama

Position	Player	Team
Second Team Offense
WR	Omar Bayless	Arkansas State
WR	Kawaan Baker	South Alabama
WR	Trey Eafford	Troy
OL	Jacob Still	Arkansas State
OL	Hunter Atkinson	Georgia State
OL	T.J. Fiailoa	Louisiana–Monroe
OL	Aaron Brewer	Texas State
OL	Tristan Crowder	Troy
TE	Collin Reed	Appalachian State
QB	Caleb Evans	Louisiana–Monroe
RB	Elijah Mitchell	Louisiana
RB	Trey Ragas	Louisiana
Second Team Defense
DL	Kevin Thurmon	Arkansas State
DL	Tarron Jackson	Coastal Carolina
DL	Zi'Yon Hill	Louisiana
DL	Jarvis Hayes	Troy
LB	Jacques Boudreaux	Louisiana
LB	Nikolas Daniels	Texas State
LB	Carlton Martial	Troy
CB	Josh Thomas	Appalachian State
CB	B.J. Edmonds	Arkansas State
CB	Darreon Jackson	Arkansas State
CB	Michael Jacquet III	Louisiana
Second Team Special Teams
K	Tyler Sumpter	Troy
P	Cody Grace	Arkansas State
RS	Darrynton Evans	Appalachian State

Ref:

== Head coaches ==
Coaches

Team	Head coach	Years at school	Overall record	Record at school	Sun Belt record
Appalachian State	Eliah Drinkwitz	1	7–1	7–1	4–1
Arkansas State	Blake Anderson	6	43–29	43–29	33–11
Coastal Carolina	Jamey Chadwell	1	66–48	6–13	2–9
Georgia Southern	Chad Lunsford	3	17–10	17–10	11–7
Georgia State	Shawn Elliott	3	16–22	15–17	9–11
Louisiana	Billy Napier	2	12–9	12–9	7–4
Louisiana–Monroe	Matt Viator	4	95–59	17–26	13–14
South Alabama	Steve Campbell	2	64–39	4–16	2–10
Texas State	Jake Spavital	1	2–5	2–5	1–2
Troy	Chip Lindsey	1	3–4	3–4	1–2

== Rankings ==
		Pre	Wk 2	Wk 3	Wk 4	Wk 5	Wk 6	Wk 7	Wk 8	Wk 9	Wk 10	Wk 11	Wk 12	Wk 13	Wk 14	Wk 15	Final
Appalachian State	AP	RV	RV	RV	RV	RV	RV	RV	24	21	20	RV	23	22	20	20	19
Appalachian State	C	RV	RV	RV	RV	RV	RV	24	22	20	RV	24	22	22	20	20	18
Appalachian State	CFP	Not released										25	24	25	21	20	
Arkansas State	AP																
Arkansas State	C																
Arkansas State	CFP	Not released															
Coastal Carolina	AP																
Coastal Carolina	C																
Coastal Carolina	CFP	Not released															
Georgia Southern	AP																
Georgia Southern	C																
Georgia Southern	CFP	Not released															
Georgia State	AP																
Georgia State	C																
Georgia State	CFP	Not released															
Louisiana	AP														RV		RV
Louisiana	C												RV	RV	RV	RV	RV
Louisiana	CFP	Not released															
Louisiana–Monroe	AP																
Louisiana–Monroe	C																
Louisiana–Monroe	CFP	Not released															
South Alabama	AP																
South Alabama	C																
South Alabama	CFP	Not released															
Texas State	AP																
Texas State	C																
Texas State	CFP	Not released															
Troy	AP																
Troy	C	RV	RV	RV													
Troy	CFP	Not released															

Legend
	Improvement in ranking
	Drop in ranking
	Not ranked previous week
	No change in ranking from previous week
RV	Received votes but were not ranked in Top 25 of poll
т	Tied with team above or below also with this symbol

== Schedules ==
=== Regular season ===
The regular season will begin on August 29, 2019, and will end on November 30, 2019.

Index to colors and formatting
Sun Belt member won
Sun Belt member lost
Sun Belt teams in **bold**

==== Week One ====
Date	Time	Visiting team	Home team	Site	TV	Result	Attendance	Ref.
August 29	7:30 p.m.	**Texas State**	No. 12 Texas A&M	Kyle Field • College Station, TX	SECN	**L** 7-41	98,016	
August 31	11:00 a.m.	**South Alabama**	Nebraska	Memorial Stadium • Lincoln, NE	ESPN	**L** 21–35	-	
August 31	11:00 a.m.	Mississippi State	**Louisiana**	Mercedes-Benz Superdome • New Orleans, LA	ESPNU	**L** 28–38	-	
August 31	2:30 p.m.	**Georgia State**	Tennessee	Neyland Stadium • Knoxville, TN	ESPNU	**W** 38–30	-	
August 31	2:30 p.m.	Eastern Michigan	**Coastal Carolina**	Brooks Stadium • Conway, SC	ESPN+	**L** 23–30	14,237	
August 31	2:30 p.m.	East Tennessee State	**Appalachian State**	Kidd Brewer Stadium • Boone, NC	ESPN+	**W** 42–7	-	
August 31	5:00 p.m.	Campbell	**Troy**	Veterans Memorial Stadium • Troy, AL	ESPN+	**W** 43–14	-	
August 31	6:00 p.m.	SMU	**Arkansas State**	Centennial Bank Stadium • Jonesboro, AR	ESPN+	**L** 30–37	-	
August 31	6:30 p.m.	**Georgia Southern**	No. 6 LSU	Tiger Stadium • Baton Rouge, LA	ESPNU	**L** 3–55	-	
August 31	7:00 p.m.	Grambling State	**Louisiana–Monroe**	Malone Stadium • Monroe, LA	ESPN3	**W** 31–9	-	
^{#}Rankings from AP Poll released prior to game. All times are in Central Time.

==== Week Two ====
Date	Time	Visiting team	Home team	Site	TV	Result	Attendance	Ref.
September 7	2:30 p.m.	Charlotte	**Appalachian State**	Kidd Brewer Stadium • Boone, NC	ESPN+	**W** 56–41	-	
September 7	4:00 p.m.	**Louisiana–Monroe**	Florida State	Doak Campbell Stadium • Tallahassee, FL	ACCN	**L** 44–45 ^{OT}	-	
September 7	5:00 p.m.	Maine	**Georgia Southern**	Paulson Stadium • Statesboro, GA	ESPN+	**W** 26–18	-	
September 7	6:00 p.m.	Furman	**Georgia State**	Georgia State Stadium • Atlanta, GA	ESPN+	**W** 48–42	-	
September 7	6:00 p.m.	Jackson State	**South Alabama**	Ladd–Peebles Stadium • Mobile, AL	ESPN3	**W** 37–14	-	
September 7	6:00 p.m.	Wyoming	**Texas State**	Bobcat Stadium • San Marcos, TX	ESPN+	**L** 14-23	-	
September 7	6:00 p.m.	**Coastal Carolina**	Kansas	David Booth Kansas Memorial Stadium • Lawrence, KS	ESPN+	**W** 12–7	33,493	
September 7	6:30 p.m.	Liberty	**Louisiana**	Cajun Field • Lafayette, LA	ESPN+	**W** 35–14	-	
September 7	9:00 p.m.	**Arkansas State**	UNLV	Sam Boyd Stadium • Whitney, NV		**W** 43–17	-	
^{#}Rankings from AP Poll released prior to game. All times are in Central Time.

==== Week Three ====
Date	Time	Visiting team	Home team	Site	TV	Result	Attendance	Ref.
September 14	11:00 a.m.	**Arkansas State**	No. 3 Georgia	Sanford Stadium • Athens, GA	ESPN2	**L** 0–55	-	
September 14	1:30 p.m.	Norfolk State	**Coastal Carolina**	Brooks Stadium • Conway, SC	ESPN3	**W** 46–7	13,659	
September 14	2:30 p.m.	**Georgia Southern**	Minnesota	TCF Bank Stadium • Minneapolis, MN	BTN	**L** 32–35		
September 14	2:30 p.m.	Memphis	**South Alabama**	Ladd–Peebles Stadium • Mobile, AL	ESPU	**L** 6–42	-	
September 14	5:00 p.m.	Southern Miss	**Troy**	Veterans Memorial Stadium • Troy, AL	ESPN+	**L** 42–47	-	
September 14	6:00 p.m.	**Texas State**	SMU	Gerald J. Ford Stadium • Dallas, TX	ESPN3	**L** 17–47	-	
September 14	6:00 p.m.	**Georgia State**	Western Michigan	Waldo Stadium • Kalamazoo, MI	ESPN+	**L** 10–57	-	
September 14	6:30 p.m.	Texas Southern	**Louisiana**	Cajun Field • Lafayette, LA	ESPN3	**W** 77–6	-	
^{#}Rankings from AP Poll released prior to game. All times are in Central Time.

==== Week Four ====
Date	Time	Visiting team	Home team	Site	TV	Result	Attendance	Ref.
September 21	11:00 a.m.	**Louisiana Monroe**	Iowa State	Jack Trice Stadium • Ames, IA	FS1	**L** 20–72	-	
September 21	12:00 p.m.	**Coastal Carolina**	UMass	Warren McGuirk Alumni Stadium • Amherst, MA		**W** 62–28	8,557	
September 21	1:00 p.m.	**Louisiana**	Ohio	Peden Stadium • Athens, OH	ESPN+	**W** 45–25	-	
September 21	2:00 p.m.	**Troy**	Akron	InfoCision Stadium • Akron, OH	ESPN+	**W** 35–7	-	
September 21	2:30 p.m.	**Appalachian State**	North Carolina	Kenan Stadium • Chapel Hill, NC	ACCNX	**W** 34–31	-	
September 21	2:30 p.m.	**South Alabama**	UAB	Legion Field • Birmingham, AL	NFL	**L** 3–35	-	
September 21	6:00 p.m.	Southern Illinois	**Arkansas State**	Centennial Bank Stadium • Jonesboro, AR	ESPN3	**W** 41–28	-	
September 21	6:00 p.m.	**Georgia State**	**Texas State**	Bobcat Stadium • San Marcos, TX	ESPN+	**TXST** 37–34 ^{3OT}	-	
^{#}Rankings from AP Poll released prior to game. All times are in Central Time.

==== Week Five ====
Date	Time	Visiting team	Home team	Site	TV	Result	Attendance	Ref.
September 28	2:30 p.m.	**Coastal Carolina**	**Appalachian State**	Kidd Brewer Stadium • Boone, NC	ESPN+	**APPST** 56–37	25,055	
September 28	5:00 p.m.	**Louisiana**	**Georgia Southern**	Paulson Stadium • Statesboro, GA	ESPN+	**ULL** 37–24	-	
September 28	5:00 p.m.	**Arkansas State**	**Troy**	Veterans Memorial Stadium • Troy, AL	ESPN+	**ARKST** 50–43	-	
September 28	6:00 p.m.	**South Alabama**	**Louisiana–Monroe**	Malone Stadium • Monroe, LA	ESPN3	**ULM** 30–17	-	
September 28	6:00 p.m.	Nicholls	**Texas State**	Bobcat Stadium • San Marcos, TX	ESPN3	**W** 24–3	-	
^{#}Rankings from AP Poll released prior to game. All times are in Central Time.

==== Week Six ====
Date	Time	Visiting team	Home team	Site	TV	Result	Attendance	Ref.
October 3	6:30 p.m.	**Georgia Southern**	**South Alabama**	Ladd–Peebles Stadium • Mobile, AL	ESPNU	**GASO** 20–17 ^{2OT}	-	
October 5	2:30 p.m.	**Arkansas State**	**Georgia State**	Georgia State Stadium • Atlanta, GA	ESPN+	**GSU** 52–38	-	
October 5	2:45 p.m.	Memphis	**Louisiana–Monroe**	Malone Stadium • Monroe, LA	ESPNU	**L** 33–52	-	
October 5	3:00 p.m.	**Troy**	Missouri	Faurot Field • Columbia, MO	SECN	**L** 10–42	-	
^{#}Rankings from AP Poll released prior to game. All times are in Central Time.

==== Week Seven ====
Date	Time	Visiting team	Home team	Site	TV	Result	Attendance	Ref.
October 9	7:00 p.m.	**Appalachian State**	**Louisiana**	Cajun Field • Lafayette, LA	ESPN2	**APPST** 17–7	-	
October 10	8:15 p.m.	**Louisiana–Monroe**	**Texas State**	Bobcat Stadium • San Marcos, TX	ESPNU	**ULM** 24–14	-	
October 12	2:00 p.m.	**Georgia State**	**Coastal Carolina**	Brooks Stadium • Conway, SC	ESPN+	**GSU** 31–21	17,249	
^{#}Rankings from AP Poll released prior to game. All times are in Central Time.

==== Week Eight ====
Date	Time	Visiting team	Home team	Site	TV	Result	Attendance	Ref.
October 16	7:00 p.m.	**South Alabama**	**Troy**	Veterans Memorial Stadium • Troy, AL (rivalry)	ESPN2	**TROY** 37–13	-	
October 17	6:30 p.m.	**Louisiana**	**Arkansas State**	Centennial Bank Stadium • Jonesboro, AR	ESPU	**ULL** 37–20	-	
October 19	2:00 p.m.	**Coastal Carolina**	**Georgia Southern**	Paulson Stadium • Statesboro, GA	ESPN3	**GASO** 30–27 ^{3OT}	11,015	
October 19	2:30 p.m.	**Louisiana–Monroe**	No. 24 **Appalachian State**	Kidd Brewer Stadium • Boone, NC	ESPN+	**APPST** 52–7	-	
October 19	6:00 p.m.	Army	**Georgia State**	Georgia State Stadium • Atlanta, GA	ESPN+	**W** 28-21	-	
^{#}Rankings from AP Poll released prior to game. All times are in Central Time.

==== Week Nine ====
Date	Time	Visiting team	Home team	Site	TV	Result	Attendance	Ref.
October 26	12:00 p.m.	No. 21 **Appalachian State**	**South Alabama**	Ladd–Peebles Stadium • Mobile, AL	ESPNU	**APPST** 30–3	-	
October 26	2:00 p.m.	New Mexico State	**Georgia Southern**	Paulson Stadium • Statesboro, GA	ESPN3	**W** 41–7	-	
October 26	6:00 p.m.	**Troy**	**Georgia State**	Georgia State Stadium • Atlanta, GA	ESPN+	**GSU** 52–33	-	
October 26	6:00 p.m.	**Texas State**	**Arkansas State**	Centennial Bank Stadium • Jonesboro, AR	ESPN+	**ARKST** 38–14	-	
^{#}Rankings from AP Poll released prior to game. All times are in Central Time.

==== Week Ten ====
Date	Time	Visiting team	Home team	Site	TV	Result	Attendance	Ref.
October 31	7:00 p.m.	**Georgia Southern**	**Appalachian State**	Brooks Stadium • Boone, NC (rivalry)	ESPNU	**GASO** 24–21	18,796	
November 2	2:00 p.m.	**Troy**	**Coastal Carolina**	Brooks Stadium • Conway, SC	ESPN3	**CCU** 36–35	15,098	
November 2	2:30 p.m.	**Arkansas State**	**Louisiana–Monroe**	Malone Stadium • Monroe, LA	ESPNU	**ARKST** 48–41	15,327	
November 2	4:00 p.m.	**Texas State**	**Louisiana**	Cajun Field • Lafayette, LA	ESPN+	**ULL** 31–3	21,063	
^{#}Rankings from AP Poll released prior to game. All times are in Central Time.

==== Week Eleven ====
Date	Time	Visiting team	Home team	Site	TV	Result	Attendance	Ref.
November 7	7:30 p.m.	**Louisiana**	**Coastal Carolina**	Brooks Stadium • Conway, SC	ESPNU	**ULL** 48–7	14,857	
November 9	3:00 p.m.	**South Alabama**	**Texas State**	Bobcat Stadium • San Marcos, TX	ESPN3	**TXST** 30–28	15,473	
November 9	3:30 p.m.	**Georgia Southern**	**Troy**	Veterans Memorial Stadium • Troy, AL	ESPN+	**TROY** 49–28	22,108	
November 9	5:00 p.m.	**Georgia State**	**Louisiana–Monroe**	Malone Stadium • Monroe, LA	ESPN+	**ULM** 45–31	13,213	
November 9	6:00 p.m.	**Appalachian State**	South Carolina	Williams–Brice Stadium • Columbia, SC	ESPN2	**W** 20–15	80,849	
^{#}Rankings from AP Poll released prior to game. All times are in Central Time.

==== Week Twelve ====
Date	Time	Visiting team	Home team	Site	TV	Result	Attendance	Ref.
November 16	2:00 p.m.	**Coastal Carolina**	**Arkansas State**	Centennial Bank Stadium • Jonesboro, AR	ESPN+	ARKST 28–27	-	
November 16	2:00 p.m.	**Louisiana–Monroe**	**Georgia Southern**	Paulson Stadium • Statesboro, GA	ESPN+	**GASO** 51–29	-	
November 16	2:00 p.m.	**Troy**	**Texas State**	Bobcat Stadium • San Marcos, TX	ESPN3	**TROY** 63–27	-	
November 16	4:00 p.m.	**Louisiana**	**South Alabama**	Ladd–Peebles Stadium • Mobile, AL	ESPN+	ULL 37–27	-	
November 16	6:30 p.m.	No. 25 **Appalachian State**	**Georgia State**	Georgia State Stadium • Atlanta, GA	ESPNU	APPST 56–27	-	
^{#}Rankings from AP Poll released prior to game. All times are in Central Time.

==== Week Thirteen ====
Date	Time	Visiting team	Home team	Site	TV	Result	Attendance	Ref.
November 23	1:00 p.m.	**South Alabama**	**Georgia State**	Georgia State Stadium • Atlanta, GA	ESPN+	GSU 28–15	-	
November 23	1:30 p.m.	**Texas State**	No. 24 **Appalachian State**	Kidd Brewer Stadium • Boone, NC	ESPN+	APPST 35–13	-	
November 23	2:00 p.m.	**Georgia Southern**	**Arkansas State**	Centennial Bank Stadium • Jonesboro, AR	ESPN+	ARKST 38–33	-	
November 23	4:00 p.m.	**Troy**	**Louisiana**	Cajun Field • Lafayette, LA	ESPN+	ULL 53–3	-	
November 23	4:00 p.m.	**Coastal Carolina**	**Louisiana–Monroe**	Malone Stadium • Monroe, LA	ESPN3	ULM 45–42	-	
^{#}Rankings from AP Poll released prior to game. All times are in Central Time.

==== Week Fourteen ====
Date	Time	Visiting team	Home team	Site	TV	Result	Attendance	Ref.
November 29	4:00 p.m.	**Arkansas State**	**South Alabama**	Ladd–Pebbles Stadium • Mobile, AL	ESPN+	**SOAL** 34–30	-	
November 29	5:00 p.m.	No. 25 **Appalachian State**	**Troy**	Veterans Memorial Stadium • Troy, AL	ESPN+	**APPST** 48–13	-	
November 30	11:00 a.m.	**Texas State**	**Coastal Carolina**	Brooks Stadium • Conway, SC	ESPN+	**CCU** 24–21	-	
November 30	5:00 p.m.	**Georgia State**	**Georgia Southern**	Paulson Stadium • Statesboro, GA (rivalry)	ESPN+	**GASO** 38–10	-	
November 30	6:30 p.m.	**Louisiana–Monroe**	**Louisiana**	Cajun Field • Lafayette, LA (Battle on the Bayou)	ESPNU	**ULL** 31–30	-	
^{#}Rankings from AP Poll released prior to game. All times are in Central Time.

=== Championship Game ===
==== Week Fifteen (Sun Belt Championship Game) ====
Date	Time	Visiting team	Home team	Site	TV	Result	Attendance	Ref.
December 7	12:00 p.m.	**Louisiana**	No. 21 **Appalachian State**	Kidd Brewer Stadium • Boone, NC	ESPN/ESPN2	**APPST** 45–38	18,618	
^{#}Rankings from AP Poll released prior to game. All times are in Eastern Time Zone.

== Sun Belt records vs. other conferences ==
2019–2020 records against non-conference foes:

Regular season

Power 5 Conferences	Record
ACC	1–1
Big Ten	0–2
Big 12	1–1
BYU/Notre Dame	0–0
Pac-12	0–0
SEC	2–5
Power 5 Total	4–9
Other FBS Conferences	Record
American	0–4
C-USA	1–2
Independents (Excluding BYU and Notre Dame)	4–0
MAC	2–2
Mountain West	1–1
Other FBS Total	8–9
FCS Opponents	Record
Football Championship Subdivision	9–0
Total Non-Conference Record	21–18

Post Season

Power Conferences 5	Record
ACC	0–0
Big Ten	0–0
Big 12	0–0
BYU/Notre Dame	0-0
Pac-12	0–0
SEC	0–0
Power 5 Total	0–0
Other FBS Conferences	Record
American	0–0
C–USA	0–0
Independents (Excluding Notre Dame)	1–0
MAC	0–0
Mountain West	0–0
Other FBS Total	0–0
Total Bowl Record	0–0

=== Sun Belt vs Power Five matchups ===
This is a list of games the Sun Belt has scheduled versus power conference teams (ACC, Big 10, Big 12, Pac-12, BYU/Notre Dame and SEC). All rankings are from the current AP Poll at the time of the game.

Date	Conference	Visitor	Home	Site	Score
August 29	SEC	Texas State	Texas A&M	Kyle Field • College Station, TX	L, 7-41
August 31	Big Ten	South Alabama	Nebraska	Memorial Stadium • Lincoln, NE	L, 21–35
August 31	SEC	Mississippi State	Louisiana	Mercedes-Benz Superdome • New Orleans, LA	L, 28–38
August 31	SEC	Georgia State	Tennessee	Neyland Stadium • Knoxville, TN	W, 38–30
August 31	SEC	Georgia Southern	LSU	Tiger Stadium • Baton Rouge, LA	L, 3–55
September 7	ACC	Louisiana-Monroe	Florida State	Doak Campbell Stadium • Tallahassee, FL	L, 44–45 (OT)
September 7	Big 12	Coastal Carolina	Kansas	Memorial Stadium • Lawrence, KS	W, 12–7
September 14	SEC	Arkansas State	Georgia	Sanford Stadium • Athens, GA	L, 0–55
September 14	Big Ten	Georgia Southern	Minnesota	TCF Bank Stadium • Minneapolis, MN	L, 32–35
September 21	Big 12	Louisiana-Monroe	Iowa State	Jack Trice Stadium • Ames, IA	L, 20–72
September 21	ACC	Appalachian State	North Carolina	Kenan Stadium • Chapel Hill, NC	W 34–31
October 5	SEC	Troy	Missouri	Faurot Field • Columbia, MO	L 10–42
November 9	SEC	Appalachian State	South Carolina	Williams–Brice Stadium • Columbia, SC	W 20–15

=== Sun Belt vs Group of Five matchups ===
The following games include Sun Belt teams competing against teams from the American, C-USA, MAC or Mountain West.

Date	Conference	Visitor	Home	Site	Score
August 31	MAC	Eastern Michigan	Coastal Carolina	Brooks Stadium • Conway, SC	L, 23–30
August 31	American	SMU	Arkansas State	Centennial Bank Stadium • Jonesboro, AR	L, 30–37
September 7	C-USA	Charlotte	Appalachian State	Kidd Brewer Stadium • Boone, NC	W, 56–41
September 7	Mountain West	Wyoming	Texas State	Bobcat Stadium • San Marcos, TX	L 14–23
September 7	Mountain West	Arkansas State	UNLV	Sam Boyd Stadium • Whitney, NV	W, 43–17
September 14	American	Memphis	South Alabama	Ladd–Peebles Stadium • Mobile, AL	L, 6–42
September 14	C-USA	Southern Miss	Troy	Veterans Memorial Stadium • Troy, AL	L, 42–47
September 14	American	Texas State	SMU	Gerald J. Ford Stadium • Dallas, TX	L, 17–47
September 14	MAC	Georgia State	Western Michigan	Waldo Stadium • Kalamazoo, MI	L, 10–57
September 21	MAC	Louisiana	Ohio	Peden Stadium • Athens, OH	W, 45–25
September 21	MAC	Troy	Akron	InfoCision Stadium • Akron, OH	W, 35–7
September 21	C-USA	South Alabama	UAB	Legion Field • Birmingham, AL	L, 35–3
October 5	American	Memphis	Louisiana–Monroe	Malone Stadium • Monroe, LA	L 33–52

=== Sun Belt vs FBS independents matchups ===
The following games include Sun Belt teams competing against FBS Independents, which includes Army, Liberty, New Mexico State, or UMass.

Date	Conference	Visitor	Home	Site	Score
September 7	Independents	Liberty	Louisiana	Cajun Field • Lafayette, LA	W 35–14
September 21	Independents	Coastal Carolina	UMass	Warren McGuirk Alumni Stadium • Amherst, MA	W 62–28
October 19	Independents	Army	Georgia State	Veterans Memorial Stadium • Atlanta, GA	W 28–21
October 26	Independents	New Mexico State	Georgia Southern	Paulson Stadium • Statesboro, GA	W 41–7

=== Sun Belt vs FCS matchups ===
Date	Visitor	Home	Site	Score
August 31	East Tennessee State	Appalachian State	Kidd Brewer Stadium • Boone, NC	W, 42–7
August 31	Campbell	Troy	Veterans Memorial Stadium • Troy, AL	W, 43–14
August 31	Grambling State	Louisiana–Monroe	Malone Stadium • Monroe, LA	W 31–9
September 7	Maine	Georgia Southern	Paulson Stadium • Statesboro, GA	W 26–18
September 7	Furman	Georgia State	Georgia State Stadium • Atlanta, GA	W 48–42
September 14	Norfolk State	Coastal Carolina	Brooks Stadium • Conway, SC	W 46–7
September 14	Texas Southern	Louisiana	Cajun Field • Lafayette, LA	W 77–6
September 21	Southern Illinois	Arkansas State	Centennial Bank Stadium • Jonesboro, AR	W 41–28
September 28	Nicholls	Texas State	Bobcat Stadium • San Marcos, TX	W 24–3

== Postseason ==
=== Bowl games ===
Legend
Sun Belt win
Sun Belt loss

Bowl game	Date	Site	Television	Time (CST)	Sun Belt team	Opponent	Score	Attendance
Cure Bowl	December 21	Exploria Stadium • Orlando, FL	CBSSN	1:30 p.m.	Georgia Southern	Liberty	16–23	18,158
Camellia Bowl	December 21	Cramton Bowl • Montgomery, AL	ESPN	4:30 p.m.	Arkansas State	FIU	34–26	16,209
New Orleans Bowl	December 21	Mercedes-Benz Superdome • New Orleans, LA	ESPN	8:00 p.m.	No. 20 Appalachian State	UAB	31–17	21,202
Arizona Bowl	December 31	Arizona Stadium • Tucson, AZ	CBSSN	3:30 p.m.	Georgia State	Wyoming	17–38	36,892
LendingTree Bowl	January 6, 2020	Ladd-Peebles Stadium • Mobile, AL	ESPN	6:30 p.m.	Louisiana	Miami (OH)	27–17	29,212

Rankings are from CFP rankings. All times Mountain Time Zone. Sun Belt teams shown in bold.

=== Selection of teams ===
- Bowl eligible: Appalachian State, Arkansas State, Georgia Southern, Georgia State, Louisiana
- Bowl-ineligible: Coastal Carolina, Louisiana–Monroe, South Alabama, Texas State, Troy

== Awards and honors ==
=== Player of the week honors ===
Week	Offensive			Defensive			Special Teams		
Week	Player	Team	Position	Player	Team	Position	Player	Team	Position
Week 1 (Sept. 2)	Dan Ellington	Georgia State	QB	Carlton Martial	Troy	LB	Massimo Biscardi	Coastal Carolina	PK
Week 2 (Sept. 9)	Darrynton Evans	Appalachian State	RB	Chandler Kryst	Coastal Carolina	CB	Tyler Bass	Georgia Southern	PK
Week 3 (Sept. 16)	Kaleb Barker	Troy	RB	Rashad Byrd	Georgia Southern	LB	Monquavion Brinson	Georgia Southern	DB
Week 4 (Sept. 23)	Elijah Mitchell	Louisiana	RB	Demetrius Taylor	Appalachian State	DL	Joshua Rowland	Texas State	PK
Week 5 (Sept. 30)	Omar Bayless	Arkansas State	WR	Jacques Boudreaux	Louisiana	LB	Cody Grace	Arkansas State	P
Week 6 (Oct. 7)	Dan Ellington (2)	Georgia State	QB	Raymond Johnson III	Georgia Southern	DL	Cody Grace (2)	Arkansas State	P
Week 7 (Oct. 14)	Zac Thomas	Appalachian State	QB	Akeem Davis-Gaither	Appalachian State	LB	Rhys Byrns	Louisiana	P
Week 8 (Oct. 21)	Raymond Calais	Louisiana	RB	Trajan Stephens-McQueen	Georgia State	LB	Tyler Sumpter	Troy	PK
Week 9 (Oct. 28)	Tra Barnett	Georgia State	RB	Nathan Page	Arkansas State	CB	Wesley Kennedy III	Georgia Southern	RB/PR
Week 10 (Nov. 4)	Wesley Kennedy III	Georgia Southern	RB	Darreon Jackson	Arkansas State	DB	Blake Grupe	Arkansas State	PK
Week 11 (Nov. 11)	Caleb Evans	Louisiana-Monroe	QB	Marcus Webb	Troy	DT	Hutch White	Texas State	WR/PR
Week 12 (Nov. 18)	Kaleb Barker	Troy	QB	Shaun Jolly	Appalachian State	DB	Anthony Beck II	Georgia Southern	P
Week 13 (Nov. 25)	Caleb Evans (2)	Louisiana-Monroe	QB	Cortez Sisco Jr.	Louisiana-Monroe	LB	Stevie Artigue	Louisiana	PK
Week 14 (Dec. 1)	Zac Thomas (2)	Appalachian State	QB	Jacques Boudreaux (2)	Louisiana	LB	Blake Grupe (2)	Arkansas State	PK

=== Sun Belt individual awards ===
The following individuals received postseason honors as voted by the Sun Belt Conference football coaches at the end of the season

Award	Player	School
Player of the Year	Omar Bayless, WR Sr.	Arkansas State
Offensive Player of the Year	Darrynton Evans, RB Jr.	Appalachian State
Defensive Player of the Year	Akeem Davis-Gaither, LB Sr.	Appalachian State
Freshman Player of the Year	Layne Hatcher, QB, Fr.	Arkansas State
Newcomer of the Year	Kaylon Geiger, WR Jr.	Troy
Coach of the Year	Billy Napier	Louisiana

=== All-conference teams ===
Position	Player	Team
First Team Offense
WR	Omar Bayless	Arkansas State
WR	Kirk Merritt	Arkansas State
WR	Kaylon Geiger	Troy
OL	Noah Hannon	Appalachian State
OL	Victor Johnson	Appalachian State
OL	Hunter Atkinson	Georgia State
OL	Kevin Dotson	Louisiana
OL	Robert Hunt	Louisiana
TE	Josh Pederson	Louisiana-Monroe
QB	Kaleb Barker	Troy
RB	Darrynton Evans	Appalachian State
RB	Tra Barnett	Georgia State
First Team Defense
DL	Demetrius Taylor	Appalachian State
DL	William Bradley-King	Arkansas State
DL	Tarron Jackson	Coastal Carolina
DL	Raymond Johnson III	Georgia Southern
LB	Akeem Davis-Gaither	Appalachian State
LB	Bryan London II	Texas State
LB	Carlton Martial	Troy
DB	Shaun Jolly	Appalachian State
DB	Darreon Jackson	Arkansas State
DB	Kindle Vildor	Georgia Southern
DB	Corey Straughter	Louisiana-Monroe
DB	Will Sunderland	Troy
First Team Special Teams
K	Blake Grupe	Arkansas State
P	Cody Grace	Arkansas State
RS	Raymond Calais	Louisiana
AP	Tra Minter	South Alabama

Position	Player	Team
Second Team Offense
WR	Thomas Hennigan	Appalachian State
WR	Corey Sutton	Appalachian State
WR	Ja'Marcus Bradley	Louisiana
OL	Cooper Hodges	Appalachian State
OL	Baer Hunter	Appalachian State
OL	Bobby Reynolds	Louisiana-Monroe
OL	Aaron Brewer	Texas State
OL	J. L. Gaston	Troy
TE	Aubry Payne	Georgia State
QB	Dan Ellington	Georgia State
RB	Elijah Mitchell	Louisiana
RB	Josh Johnson	Louisiana-Monroe
Second Team Defense
DL	Kevin Thurmon	Arkansas State
DL	Zi'Yon Hill	Louisiana
DL	Jeffery Whatley	South Alabama
DL	Will Choloh	Troy
LB	Jordan Fehr	Appalachian State
LB	Rashad Byrd	Georgia Southern
LB	Joe Dillon	Louisiana
LB	Cortez Sisco	Louisiana-Monroe
DB	Josh Thomas	Appalachian State
DB	B.J. Edmonds	Arkansas State
DB	Chandler Kryst	Coastal Carolina
DB	Michael Jacquet	Louisiana
Second Team Special Teams
K	Tyler Bass	Georgia Southern
P	Rhys Byrns	Louisiana
RS	Darrynton Evans	Appalachian State
AP	Darrynton Evans	Appalachian State

Position	Player	Team
Third Team Offense
WR	Jonathan Adams	Arkansas State
WR	Cornelius McCoy	Georgia State
WR	Reggie Todd	Troy
OL	Jarrett Horst	Arkansas State
OL	Jacob Still	Arkansas State
OL	Trey Carter	Coastal Carolina
OL	Shamarious Gilmore	Georgia State
OL	Kirk Kelley	Troy
TE	Isaiah Likely	Coastal Carolina
QB	Zac Thomas	Appalachian State
RB	Raymond Calais	Louisiana
RB	Trey Ragas	Louisiana
Third Team Defense
DL	E.J. Scott	Appalachian State
DL	C. J. Brewer	Coastal Carolina
DL	Sterling Johnson	Coastal Carolina
DL	Donald Louis	Louisiana-Monroe
DL	Marcus Webb	Troy
LB	Tajhea Chambers	Arkansas State
LB	Teddy Gallagher	Coastal Carolina
LB	Nikolas Daniels	Texas State
DB	Desmond Franklin	Appalachian State
DB	Monquavion Brinson	Georgia Southern
DB	Kendrick Duncan Jr.	Georgia Southern
DB	Travis Reed	South Alabama
Third team Special Teams
K	Stevie Artigue	Louisiana
P	Tyler Sumpter	Troy
RS	Reggie Todd	Troy
AP	Raymond Calais	Louisiana

*Denotes Unanimous Selection

Ref:

All Conference Honorable Mentions: Noel Cook, Appalachian State (Sr., LB, Reidsville, N.C.) Ryan Neuzil, Appalachian State (Jr., OL, Bradenton, Fla.) Marcus Williams Jr., Appalachian State (Jr., RB, Rocky Mount, N.C.) Malik Williams, Appalachian State (Jr., WR, Chester, S.C.) Caleb Bonner, Arkansas State (Jr., LB, Reform, Ala.) Andre Harris Jr., Arkansas State (So., OL, Oklahoma City, Okla.) Marcel Murray, Arkansas State (So., RB, Hiram, Ga.) Ivory Scott, Arkansas State (Jr., OL, Kenner, La.) Shadell Bell, Coastal Carolina (RSr., TE, Decatur, Ga.) Jaivon Heiligh, Coastal Carolina (So., WR, Venice, Fla.) Ethan Howard, Coastal Carolina (RSr., OL, Brookwood, Ala.) CJ Marable, Coastal Carolina (Jr., RB, Decatur, Ga.) Shai Werts, Georgia Southern (RJr., QB, Clinton, S.C.) Wesley Kennedy III, Georgia Southern (Jr., RB, Savannah, Ga.) J.D. King, Georgia Southern (Jr., RB, Fitzgerald, Ga.) Reynard Ellis, Georgia Southern (RSo., LB, Birmingham, Ala.) Roger Carter, Georgia State (Jr., TE, Columbia, S.C.) Malik Sumter, Georgia State (RSo., C, Irmo, S.C.) Hardrick Willis, Georgia State (RSo., DE, Jonesboro, Ga.) Dontae Wilson, Georgia State (Jr., NG, Jefferson, Ga.) Jacques Boudreaux, Louisiana (Sr., LB, New Orleans, La.) Jarrod Jackson, Louisiana (RSr., WR, Reserve, La.) Chauncey Manac, Louisiana (RJr., LB, Homerville, Ga.) Nick Ralston, Louisiana (Gr., TE, Argyle, Texas) Caleb Evans, ULM (Sr., QB, Mansfield, Texas) Markis McCray, ULM (RSr., WR, Euless, Texas) Larance Shaw, ULM (Sr., DL, Fort Worth, Texas) Eastwood Thomas, ULM (RSr., OL, Jackson, Ala.) Kawaan Baker, South Alabama (Jr., WR, Atlanta, Ga.) Sean Brown, South Alabama (Sr., DL, Pleasant Grove, Ala.) Riley Cole, South Alabama (Jr., LB, Oneonta, Ala.) Jacob Shoemaker, South Alabama (Jr., OL, Gulfport, Miss.) Jarron Morris, Texas State (So., CB, Orange, Texas) Caeveon Patton, Texas State (Jr., DT, Cuero, Texas) Hutch White, Texas State (Sr., WR, Kerrville, Texas) Khambrail Winters, Texas State (Fr., CB, Houston, Texas) Dylan Bradshaw, Troy (Jr., OL, Enterprise, Ala.) Khalil McClain, Troy (Jr., WR, Fairburn, Ga.) Dell Pettus, Troy (Fr., DB, Harvest, Ala.) Austin Stidham, Troy (RSo., OL, Russellville, Ala.)

=== All-Americans ===
The 2019 College Football All-America Teams are composed of the following College Football All-American first teams chosen by the following selector organizations: Associated Press (AP), Football Writers Association of America (FWAA), American Football Coaches Association (AFCA), Walter Camp Foundation (WCFF), The Sporting News (TSN), Sports Illustrated (SI), USA Today (USAT) ESPN, CBS Sports (CBS), FOX Sports (FOX) College Football News (CFN), Bleacher Report (BR), Scout.com, Phil Steele (PS), SB Nation (SB), Athlon Sports, Pro Football Focus (PFF) and Yahoo! Sports (Yahoo!).

Currently, the NCAA compiles consensus all-America teams in the sports of Division I-FBS football and Division I men's basketball using a point system computed from All-America teams named by coaches associations or media sources. The system consists of three points for a first-team honor, two points for second-team honor, and one point for third-team honor. Honorable mention and fourth team or lower recognitions are not accorded any points. Football consensus teams are compiled by position and the player accumulating the most points at each position is named first team consensus all-American. Currently, the NCAA recognizes All-Americans selected by the AP, AFCA, FWAA, TSN, and the WCFF to determine Consensus and Unanimous All-Americans. Any player named to the First Team by all five of the NCAA-recognized selectors is deemed a Unanimous All-American.

Position	Player	School	Selector	Unanimous	Consensus
First Team All-Americans
G	Kevin Dotson	Louisiana	AP, SI, USAT		

Position	Player	School	Selector	Unanimous	Consensus
Second Team All-Americans
WR	Omar Bayless	Arkansas State	WCFF, TSN		
G	Kevin Dotson	Louisiana	TSN		
CB	Corey Straughter	Louisiana-Monroe	USAT		

Position	Player	School	Selector	Unanimous	Consensus
Third Team All-Americans
WR	Omar Bayless	Arkansas State	AP		

Position	Player	School	Selector	Unanimous	Consensus
Fourth Team All-Americans

*AFCA All-America Team
*AP All-America teams
*CBS Sports All-America Team
*ESPN All-America Team
*FWAA All-America Team
*Sports Illustrated All-America Team
*The Athletic All-America Team
*USA Today All-America Team
*Walter Camp All-America Team
*Sporting News All-America Team

=== National award winners ===
2019 College Football Award Winners

== Home game attendance ==
Team	Stadium	Capacity	Game 1	Game 2	Game 3	Game 4	Game 5	Game 6	Game 7	Total	Average	% of Capacity
Appalachian State	Kidd Brewer Stadium	30,000	25,147	29,182	25.055				—	79,384	27,165	88.2%
Arkansas State	Centennial Bank Stadium	30,382	22,076	24,176					—	46,252	23,126	76.1%
Coastal Carolina	Brooks Stadium	21,000	14,237	13,659	17,249				—	45,145	15,048	71.7%
Georgia State	Georgia State Stadium	24,333	20,351						—	20,351	20,351	83.6%
Georgia Southern	Paulson Stadium	25,000	17,202	19,220					—	36,422	18,211	72.8%
Louisiana	Cajun Field	36,900	16,231	18,183					—	34,414	17,207	47.7%
Louisiana–Monroe	Malone Stadium	30,427	28,327	16,222					—	45,549	22,274	73.2%
South Alabama	Ladd–Peebles Stadium	33,471	14,511	12,373					—	26,884	13,442	40.1%
Texas State	Bobcat Stadium	30,000	20,003	15,803	19,159				—	54,965	18,321	61.1%
Troy	Veterans Memorial Stadium	30,402	23,172	27,108	26,437				—	76,717	25,572	84.1%

Bold – Exceed capacity
†Season High

== NFL draft ==
The following list includes all Sun Belt players who were drafted in the 2020 NFL draft.

Round #	Pick #	NFL team	Player	Position	College
2	39	Miami Dolphins	Robert Hunt	G	Louisiana
3	93	Tennessee Titans	Darrynton Evans	RB	Appalachian State
4	107	Cincinnati Bengals	Akeem Davis-Gaither	OLB	Appalachian State
4	135	Pittsburgh Steelers	Kevin Dotson	G	Louisiana
5	163	Chicago Bears	Kindle Vildor	CB	Georgia Southern
6	188	Buffalo Bills	Tyler Bass	K	Georgia Southern
7	245	Tampa Bay Buccaneers	Raymond Calais	RB	Louisiana
