= Robert Hunt (American football, born 1996) =

American football player (born 1996)

No. 50 – Carolina Panthers
- Position: Guard
- Roster status: Active

Personal information
- Born: August 25, 1996 (age 30); Jasper, Texas, U.S.
- Listed height: 6 ft 6 in (1.98 m)
- Listed weight: 335 lb (152 kg)

Career information
- High school: Burkeville (Burkeville, Texas)
- College: Louisiana (2015–2019)
- NFL draft: 2020: 2nd round, 39th overall pick

Career history
- Miami Dolphins (2020–2023); Carolina Panthers (2024–present)

Awards and highlights
- Pro Bowl (2024); First team All-Sun Belt (2019); Second team All-Sun Belt (2018)

Career NFL statistics as of 2025
- Games played: 79
- Games started: 73
- Stats at Pro Football Reference

Robert Hunt (born August 25, 1996) is an American professional football guard for the Carolina Panthers of the National Football League (NFL). He played college football for the Louisiana Ragin' Cajuns.

== Early life ==
Hunt was born in Wiergate, Texas, before moving with his family to Fort Worth, Texas at a young age. His family moved back to the Wiergate area briefly before evacuating to Fort Worth after Hurricane Rita and another move back to the Wiergate area resulted in a third move back to Fort Worth after his family's home burned down. Hunt moved back to Newton County to live with his aunt and attended Burkeville High School after his freshman year. He played basketball and football for the Mustangs. Hunt committed to play college football for Louisiana over an offer from Houston.

== College career ==
Hunt redshirted his true freshman season at the University of Louisiana at Lafayette. He was named the Ragin' Cajuns starting left guard after spring practice and started all 13 of the team's games as a redshirt freshman. As a redshirt sophomore, Hunt started 11 games (nine at left guard and two at left tackle) while missing one game due to a suspension. As a redshirt junior Hunt started all 14 of the Ragin' Cajuns games and was named second team All-Sun Belt Conference Hunt only played in seven games as a redshirt senior due to a groin injury but was still named first team All-Sun Belt. He was invited to play in the 2020 Senior Bowl but was unable to participate due to his injury.

== Professional career ==
Pre-draft measurables
Height	Weight	Arm length	Hand span	Wingspan	Wonderlic
6 ft 5 1/8 in (1.96 m)	323 lb (147 kg)	33 1/2 in (0.85 m)	10 3/4 in (0.27 m)	6 ft 10 in (2.08 m)	13
All values from NFL Combine

=== Miami Dolphins ===
Hunt was selected by the Miami Dolphins in the second round of the 2020 NFL draft with the 39th pick. Hunt made his NFL debut on September 13, 2020, in the season opener against the New England Patriots. Hunt made his first career start on October 11, in a 43–17 victory over the San Francisco 49ers, lining up at right tackle.

=== Carolina Panthers ===
On March 13, 2024, Hunt signed a five-year, $100 million contract with the Carolina Panthers. He started all 16 games he played in for Carolina, and received his first career Pro Bowl selection.

Hunt began the 2025 season as one of Carolina's starting guards. In Week 2 against the Arizona Cardinals, Hunt suffered a torn left biceps, an injury that required surgery; he was placed on injured reserve on September 15. Hunt was activated on January 9, 2026, ahead of the team's Wild Card matchup against the Los Angeles Rams.
