= Aaron Brewer (offensive lineman) =

American football player (born 1997)

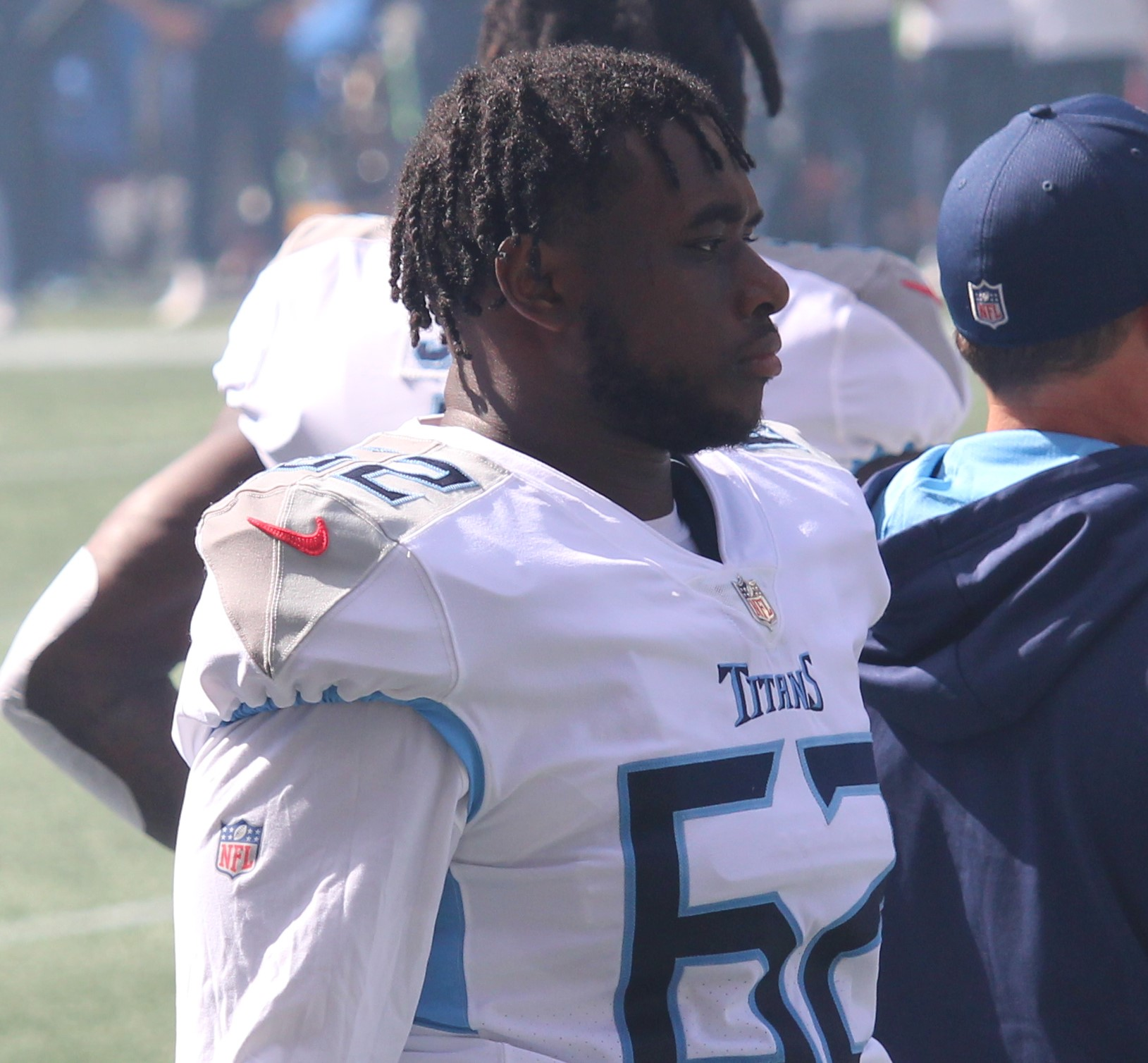
- Brewer with the Tennessee Titans in 2021

No. 55 – Miami Dolphins
- Position: Center
- Roster status: Active

Personal information
- Born: October 28, 1997 (age 29); Dallas, Texas, U.S.
- Listed height: 6 ft 1 in (1.85 m)
- Listed weight: 290 lb (132 kg)

Career information
- High school: Skyline (Dallas)
- College: Texas State (2016–2019)
- NFL draft: 2020: undrafted

Career history
- Tennessee Titans (2020–2023); Miami Dolphins (2024–present)

Awards and highlights
- Second-team All-Pro (2025); Second-team All-Sun Belt (2019); Third-team All-Sun Belt (2016, 2017)

Career NFL statistics as of Week 4, 2026
- Games played: 95
- Games started: 77
- Fumble recoveries: 2
- Stats at Pro Football Reference

Aaron Jamal Brewer (born October 28, 1997) is an American professional football center for the Miami Dolphins of the National Football League (NFL). He played college football for the Texas State Bobcats, and signed with the Tennessee Titans as an undrafted free agent in 2020.

== Early life ==
Brewer is the son of Thedra and Keith Brewer. He attended Skyline High School (Texas) where he was rated as a two-star recruit by Rivals.com. As a senior, he earned All-District 9-6A First-Team honors as an offensive guard. Brewer also competed in throws for track and field.

== College career ==
Brewer received offers for play for Sam Houston State and Texas State. He ultimately accepted the offer to play at Texas State under head coach Everett Withers, a former defensive backs coach for the Tennessee Titans. In his freshman season, Brewer played in all twelve Texas State games and made eleven starts. In his next three seasons, Brewer started all of the team's 36 games. He earned Third-team All-Sun Belt Conference selections in his freshman and sophomore years, Honorable Mention All-Sun Belt Conference in his junior year, and Second-team All-Sun Belt Conference in his senior year. In his junior year, Pro Football Focus (PFF) ranked Brewer as the Sun Belt's best run blocker and second-best pass blocker. In his senior season, Brewer received a grade of 82.8 by PFF, ranking highest in the conference.

== Professional career ==
Pre-draft measurables
Height	Weight	Arm length	Hand span	Wingspan
6 ft 1 7/8 in (1.88 m)	274 lb (124 kg)	32 3/4 in (0.83 m)	10 1/8 in (0.26 m)	6 ft 6 3/4 in (2.00 m)
All values from Pro Day

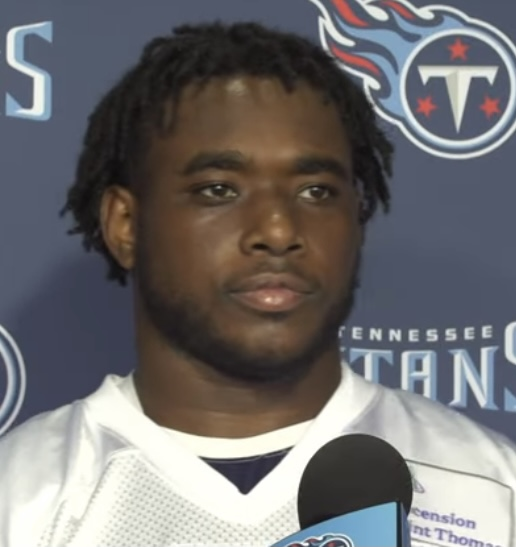
Brewer in 2021

=== Tennessee Titans ===
After going unselected in the 2020 NFL draft, Brewer signed as an undrafted free agent with the Tennessee Titans on May 7, 2020. On September 5, Brewer earned a spot on the Titans' initial 53-player roster. On November 22, Brewer recorded his first start of his career when he started at left guard for the Titans against the Baltimore Ravens. He played all 70 offensive snaps in the 30–24 overtime victory. Brewer, along with the rest of the offensive line, helped Titans running back Derrick Henry rush for 133 yards, including a game-winning 33-yard touchdown. Brewer was placed on the reserve/COVID-19 list by the team on January 7, 2021, and activated on January 18. On October 8, Brewer was placed on injured reserve. He was activated on November 6.

Having previously played more of a reserve role or starting in relief of injuries for his first two seasons, Brewer became the full time starting left guard in the 2022 season; starting all 17 games.

Entering the 2023 offseason as a restricted free agent, the Titans placed a second round tender on Brewer on March 15, 2023. On May 7, the Titans announced that Brewer would be moved to center, and take over the starting role that was vacated following the release of Ben Jones. He started all 17 games at center in 2023.

=== Miami Dolphins ===
==== 2024 ====
On March 15, 2024, Brewer signed a three-year, $21 million contract with the Miami Dolphins. He started all 17 games in the 2024 season.

==== 2025 ====
Brewer anchored a rushing attack that averages 4.7 yards per carry, which was 4th best in the league. Brewer allowed only one sack in 2025, according to PFF, which was tied for the fewest among starting centers across the league. Brewer was named a second-team all pro and a finalist for the protector of the year award.

==== 2026 ====
On June 11, 2026, Brewer signed a three-year, $52.5 million contract with Miami that runs through the 2029 season.

== NFL career statistics ==
Legend
**Bold**	Career high

Year	Team	Games		Offense					
Year	Team	GP	GS	Snaps	Pct	Holding	False start	Decl/Pen	Acpt/Pen
2020	TEN	12	1	152	19%	1	0	1	1
2021	TEN	12	5	507	59%	1	**2**	1	3
2022	TEN	17	17	1,031	**100%**	4	**2**	2	**6**
2023	TEN	17	17	1,050	**100%**	3	0	0	3
2024	MIA	17	17	**1,138**	**100%**	**5**	1	1	**6**
2025	MIA	16	16	914	99%	3	**2**	**3**	5
Career		91	73	4,792	-	17	7	8	24
