= Friendship Christian School (Tennessee) =

Location
- 5400 Coles Ferry Pike; Lebanon, Tennessee address 37087; 36.2694°N 86.3414°W

Information
- Type: Private grades Pre-K-12
- Motto: Strong Minds. Strong Faith.
- Religious affiliation: Christian
- Denomination: Non-Denominational
- Founded: 1973
- President: Jon Shoulders
- Principal: Veronica Bender
- Employees: 145 (2020)
- Enrollment: 700 (2007)
- Campus size: 41.30 acres 16.71 ha.
- Mascot: Commanders
- Website: http://www.fcsweb.net
- Last updated: January 2021

Friendship Christian School is a private K-12 Christian school located in Wilson County, Tennessee, near Lebanon.

The school has two principals, one for the Pre-K school (Kristi Chaffin) and another for the rest of the K-12 institution (Veronica Bender). The president of the school itself is Jon Shoulders.
