= Tyler Bass =

American football player (born 1997)

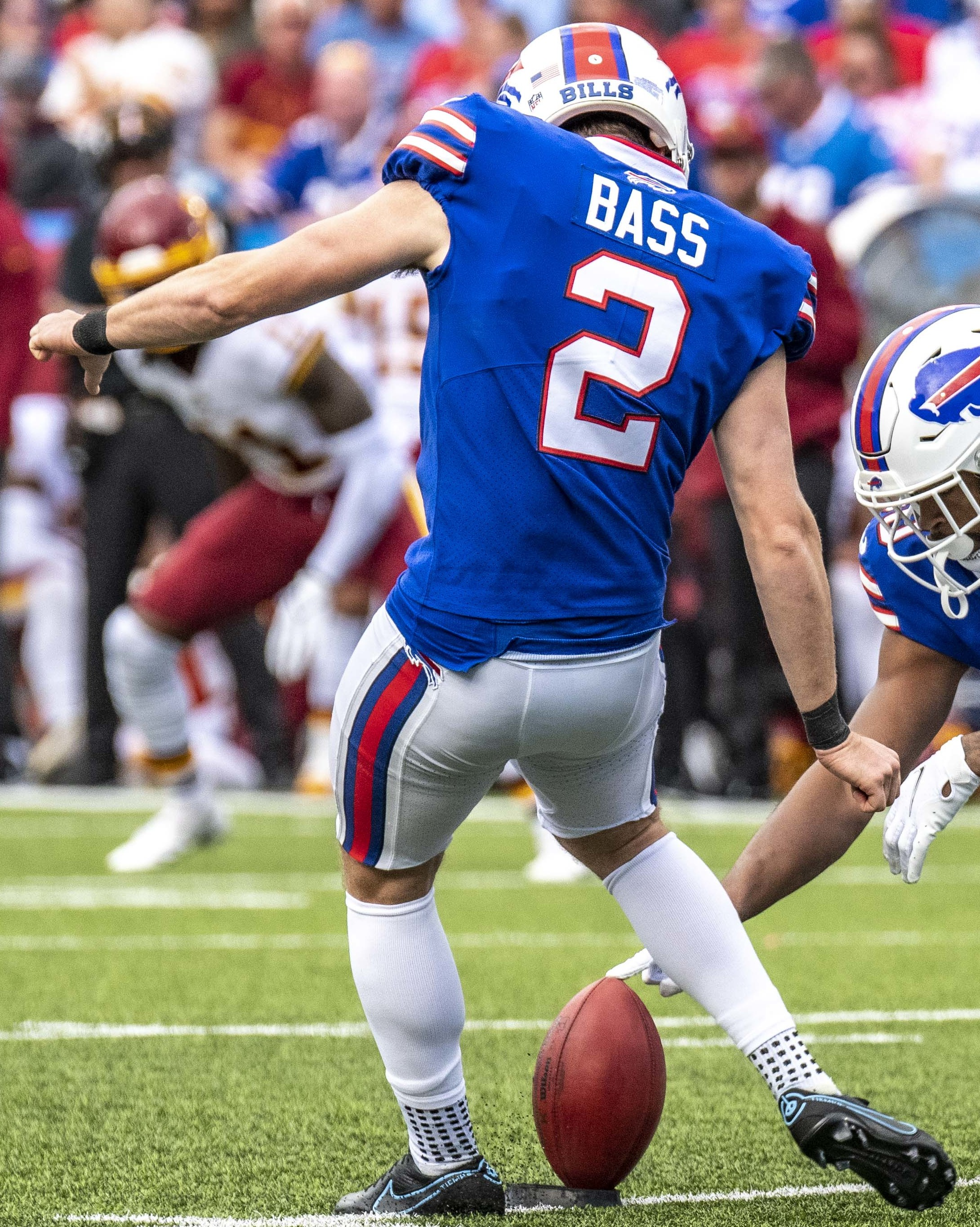
- Bass with the Buffalo Bills in 2021

No. 16 – Buffalo Bills
- Position: Placekicker
- Roster status: Active

Personal information
- Born: February 14, 1997 (age 29); Columbia, South Carolina, U.S.
- Listed height: 5 ft 10 in (1.78 m)
- Listed weight: 183 lb (83 kg)

Career information
- High school: Dutch Fork (Irmo, South Carolina)
- College: Georgia Southern (2015–2019)
- NFL draft: 2020: 6th round, 188th overall pick

Career history
- Buffalo Bills (2020–present)

Awards and highlights
- First-team All-Sun Belt (2018); 2× Second-team All-Sun Belt (2017, 2019)

Career NFL statistics as of Week 11, 2026
- Field goals made: 155
- Field goals attempted: 180
- Field goal %: 86.1
- Longest field goal: 61
- Touchbacks: 301
- Stats at Pro Football Reference

Tyler Royce Bass (born February 14, 1997) is an American professional football placekicker for the Buffalo Bills of the National Football League (NFL). He played college football for the Georgia Southern Eagles and was selected by the Bills in the sixth round of the 2020 NFL draft.

== Early life ==
Bass played high school football and soccer at Dutch Fork High School in Irmo, South Carolina. He credits his grandmother for convincing him to try out for the football team due to his strong soccer leg. He committed to Georgia Southern on January 31, 2015. He won the Chris Sailer award, awarded to the best high school football kicker, following his senior season.

== College career ==
Bass was redshirted his true freshman year at Georgia Southern. He saw significant improvement in his redshirt junior season, making 19 of 21 field goal attempts and 45 of 45 extra point attempts. During his last game at Georgia Southern, he began his practice of wearing eye black under only one eye as a shoutout to his grandmother.

He participated in the 2020 Senior Bowl, making 2 field goals and 4 of 4 extra point attempts.

== Professional career ==
Pre-draft measurables
Height	Weight	Arm length	Hand span	Wingspan
5 ft 10 1/2 in (1.79 m)	185 lb (84 kg)	29 1/2 in (0.75 m)	8 3/4 in (0.22 m)	5 ft 11 1/2 in (1.82 m)
All values from NFL Combine

=== 2020 season ===
The Buffalo Bills selected Bass in the sixth round, 188th overall, of the 2020 NFL draft. Bills special teams coordinator Heath Farwell revelated that he was still in Georgia during the COVID-19 pandemic and was able to attend Bass’s pre-draft workout when other pro days were being canceled.

Bass signed a four-year, $3.475 million contract with the Bills on May 7, 2020. He then gained national attention after posting practice videos of him kicking a 50-yard field goal without taking a single step toward the football and a 60-yard field goal with only one step.

During a shortened training camp, Bass beat out incumbent placekicker Stephen Hauschka to gain the starting position, with the Bills cutting Hauschka on August 27, 2020. Bass drove two and a half hours from South Carolina to Birmingham, Alabama for weekly training sessions with the team's long snapper and holder.

During his professional debut against the New York Jets on September 13, 2020, Bass completed all three of his extra point attempts, but was 2 for 4 on field goal attempts. His first attempt, from 38 yards out, was subject to controversy as the ball appeared to have sailed above the upright, but was discounted. He then missed his second attempt from 34 yards before connecting from 22 and 19 yards. Bass made his next four field goal attempts over the next five games, including a 48-yarder against the Kansas City Chiefs in week 6, before missing on a 52-yard attempt in the same game. In the rematch against the Jets, Bass completed 6 of 8 field goal attempts, including a new career-long 53-yard attempt, scoring the only points of the game for Buffalo as the team won 18–10. Bass set several franchise records in that game, including the most field goal attempts attempted by a Bills kicker in one game.

After making three of four field goals against the Seattle Seahawks in week 9 (with his lone miss being a 61-yard attempt), Bass converted all three of his field goal attempts against the Arizona Cardinals, with all of them being longer than 54 yards and his longest being 58 yards out. Bass became the first kicker in Bills history to make three field goals longer than 50 yards in one game, and just the second kicker in NFL history to make 3 field goals longer than 54 yards in the same game (the other being Kris Brown in 2007).

Bass converted 28 of his 34 field goal attempts and 57 of his 59 extra points, totaling 141 points. His 141 points broke Steve Christie's 1998 franchise-record of 140 points in a single season. He also broke Scott Norwood's franchise records of extra points attempted and made in a single season.

=== 2021 season ===
Bass was named AFC Special Teams Player of the Month for October 2021, making all of his extra point attempts while also converting all 10 of his field goal attempts. In the 2021 season, Bass converted all 51 extra point attempts and 28 of 32 field goal attempts.

=== 2022 season ===
Bass was named AFC Special Teams Player of the Month for November. In the 2022 season, Bass converted 48 of 50 extra point attempts and 27 of 31 field goal attempts. Bass converted all five extra point attempts and all three field goal attempts in the Bills' two postseason games.

=== 2023 season ===
On April 20, 2023, Bass signed a four-year, $21 million extension with the Bills. Bass was named AFC Special Teams Player of the Month for September. In the 2023 season, Bass converted 49 of 50 extra point attempts and 24 of 29 field goal attempts.

In the Divisional Round of the 2023–24 NFL playoffs versus the Kansas City Chiefs, Bass missed a game-tying 44-yard field goal attempt with less than two minutes remaining, ultimately leading to Buffalo’s elimination from the playoffs. This kick drew comparisons to a previous Bills kick known as Wide Right. Days after the loss to the Chiefs in the Divisional Round, Bass deactivated his social media accounts after getting bombarded with death threats and harassment from football fans. Bills quarterback Josh Allen defended Bass' missed kick, saying the team should never have been in that situation to begin with. Bass reactivated his social media on February 15.

=== 2024 season ===
In Week 9, Bass set a new franchise record for longest field goal in Buffalo Bills history at 61 yards. He made the kick with 5 seconds left in the fourth quarter to win the game for Buffalo over Miami, 30–27. The kick came in a game in which Bass had otherwise struggled, in which Bass had missed an extra point and bounced another off an upright. He finished the 2024 season converting 24 of 29 field goal attempts and 59 of 64 extra point attempts.

=== 2025 season ===
On September 5, 2025, Bass was placed on injured reserve to begin the season, due to hip and groin issues. On December 1, it was revealed that Bass underwent surgery on his left hip/groin, thus ending his season. Veteran placekicker Matt Prater was signed by the Bills at the beginning of the season to take over his duties.

== Records and achievements ==
=== Bills franchise records ===
- Longest field goal: 61 yards (November 3, 2024, vs. Miami Dolphins)
- Most field goals attempted in a game: 8 (October 25, 2020, vs. New York Jets)
- Most field goals made in a game: 6, shared with Steve Christie (October 25, 2020, vs. New York Jets, November 20, 2022, vs. Cleveland Browns)
- Most points scored in a single season: 141 (2020)
