= Akeem Davis-Gaither =

American football player (born 1997)

No. 51 – Indianapolis Colts
- Position: Linebacker
- Roster status: Injured reserve

Personal information
- Born: September 21, 1997 (age 29); Thomasville, North Carolina, U.S.
- Listed height: 6 ft 2 in (1.88 m)
- Listed weight: 238 lb (108 kg)

Career information
- High school: Thomasville (NC)
- College: Appalachian State (2015–2019)
- NFL draft: 2020: 4th round, 107th overall pick

Career history
- Cincinnati Bengals (2020–2024); Arizona Cardinals (2025); Indianapolis Colts (2026–present)

Awards and highlights
- Sun Belt Defensive Player of the Year (2019); First-team All-Sun Belt (2019); Second-team All-Sun Belt (2018)

Career NFL statistics as of Week 8, 2026
- Total tackles: 386
- Sacks: 0.5
- Forced fumbles: 3
- Fumble recoveries: 3
- Interceptions: 3
- Pass deflections: 17
- Stats at Pro Football Reference

Akeem Brian Davis-Gaither (born September 21, 1997) is an American professional football linebacker for the Indianapolis Colts of the National Football League (NFL). He has previously played in the NFL for the Cincinnati Bengals and Arizona Cardinals. He played college football for the Appalachian State Mountaineers.

== Early life ==
Davis-Gaither attended Thomasville High School in Thomasville, North Carolina. As a senior in 2015, he had 115 tackles with five sacks and also had eight rushing touchdowns as a running back. He committed to Appalachian State University to play college football.

== College career ==
Davis-Gaither played at Appalachian State from 2015 to 2019. As a senior in 2019, he was the Sun Belt Conference Defensive Player of the Year after recording 101 tackles, five sacks and an interception. For his career, Davis-Gaither had 201 tackles, 6.5 sacks and the interception.

== Professional career ==
Pre-draft measurables
Height	Weight	Arm length	Hand span	Wingspan	Bench press
6 ft 1 1/2 in (1.87 m)	224 lb (102 kg)	31 1/8 in (0.79 m)	9 1/2 in (0.24 m)	6 ft 3 1/8 in (1.91 m)	21 reps
All values from NFL Combine

=== Cincinnati Bengals ===
Davis-Gaither was selected by the Cincinnati Bengals in the fourth round with the 107th pick of the 2020 NFL draft. In Week 17 against the Baltimore Ravens, Davis-Gaither recorded his first career interception off a pass thrown by Lamar Jackson during the 38–3 loss.

On November 9, 2021, Davis-Gaither was placed on injured reserve after suffering a foot injury in Week 9. In 2022, Davis recorded a career high 46 tackles and his first fumble recovery. He also intercepted a pass in the Bengals wildcard playoff win against the Ravens.

On March 13, 2024, Davis-Gaither signed a one-year contract extension with the Bengals.

=== Arizona Cardinals ===
On March 13, 2025, Davis-Gaither signed with the Arizona Cardinals on a two-year, $11 million contract. He played in all 17 games for Arizona (including 13 starts), finishing second on the team with a career-high 117 tackles.

On March 6, 2026, Davis-Gaither was released by the Cardinals.

=== Indianapolis Colts ===
On March 18, 2026, Davis-Gaither signed a one-year, $2.725 million contract with the Indianapolis Colts.

== NFL career statistics ==
Legend
**Bold**	Career high

=== Regular season ===
Year	Team	Games		Tackles					Interceptions						Fumbles				
Year	Team	GP	GS	Cmb	Solo	Ast	Sck	TFL	Int	Yds	Avg	Lng	TD	PD	FF	Fmb	FR	Yds	TD
2020	CIN	16	2	31	20	11	**0.5**	0	**1**	0	0.0	0	0	3	0	0	0	0	0
2021	CIN	9	0	28	21	7	0.0	0	0	0	0.0	0	0	3	**1**	0	0	0	0
2022	CIN	16	1	46	30	16	0.0	2	0	0	0.0	0	0	1	0	0	**1**	**3**	0
2023	CIN	13	1	17	10	7	0.0	1	0	0	0.0	0	0	0	0	0	0	0	0
2024	CIN	17	7	82	41	41	0.0	**4**	**1**	**12**	**12.0**	**12**	0	4	**1**	0	**1**	0	0
2025	ARI	17	13	**117**	**51**	**66**	0.0	2	**1**	0	0.0	0	0	**5**	**1**	0	**1**	0	0
2026	IND	8	8	65	33	32	0.0	3	0	0	0.0	0	0	1	0	0	0	0	0
Career		96	32	386	206	180	0.5	12	3	12	4.0	12	0	17	3	0	3	3	0

=== Postseason ===
Year	Team	Games		Tackles					Interceptions						Fumbles				
Year	Team	GP	GS	Cmb	Solo	Ast	Sck	TFL	Int	Yds	Avg	Lng	TD	PD	FF	Fmb	FR	Yds	TD
2022	CIN	3	0	6	5	1	0.0	0	1	0	0.0	0	0	1	0	0	0	0	0
Career		3	0	6	5	1	0.0	0	1	0	0.0	0	0	1	0	0	0	0	0
