= 2019 Texas State Bobcats football team =

American college football season

2019 Texas State Bobcats football
- Conference: Sun Belt Conference
- West Division
- Record: 3–9 (2–6 Sun Belt)
- Head coach: Jake Spavital (1st season)
- Offensive coordinator: Bob Stitt (1st season)
- Offensive scheme: Spread
- Defensive coordinator: Zac Spavital (1st season)
- Base defense: 3–4
- Home stadium: Bobcat Stadium

2019 Sun Belt Conference football standings
	Conf.			Overall
Team	W		L	W		L
East Division
No. 19 Appalachian State x$	7	–	1	13	–	1
Georgia Southern	5	–	3	7	–	6
Georgia State	4	–	4	7	–	6
Troy	3	–	5	5	–	7
Coastal Carolina	2	–	6	5	–	7
West Division
Louisiana x	7	–	1	11	–	3
Arkansas State	5	–	3	8	–	5
Louisiana–Monroe	4	–	4	5	–	7
Texas State	2	–	6	3	–	9
South Alabama	1	–	7	2	–	10
Championship: Appalachian State 45, Louisiana 38
$ – Conference champion; x – Division champion/co-champions; Rankings from AP Poll

The 2019 Texas State Bobcats football team represented Texas State University in the 2019 NCAA Division I FBS football season. The Bobcats played their home games at the Bobcat Stadium in San Marcos, Texas and competed in the West Division of the Sun Belt Conference. They were led by first-year head coach Jake Spavital.

== Preseason ==
=== Sun Belt media poll ===
The Sun Belt coaches poll was released on July 18, 2019. Texas State was picked to finish fifth in the West Division.

=== Preseason All-Sun Belt teams ===
Texas State placed three players to the All-Sun Belt team.

Offense

2nd team

- Aaron Brewer – SR, Offensive Lineman

Defensive

1st team

- Bryan London II – SR, Linebacker

2nd team

- Nikolas Daniels – SR, Linebacker

=== Award watch lists ===
Listed in the order that they were released

Award	Player	Position	Year
Bednarik Award	Bryan London II	LB	SR
Rimington Award	Aaron Brewer	OL	SR
Nagurski Award	Bryan London II	LB	SR
Wuerffel Trophy	Hutch White	WR	SR

== Schedule ==
Texas State announced its 2019 football schedule on March 1, 2019. The 2019 schedule consisted of 6 home and away games in the regular season.

Date	Time	Opponent	Site	TV	Result	Attendance
August 29	7:30 p.m.	at No. 12 Texas A&M*	Kyle Field; College Station, TX	SECN	L 7–41	98,016
September 7	6:00 p.m.	Wyoming*	Bobcat Stadium; San Marcos, TX	ESPN+	L 14–23	18,003
September 14	6:00 p.m.	at SMU*	Gerald J. Ford Stadium; Dallas, TX	ESPN3	L 17–47	17,461
September 21	6:00 p.m.	Georgia State	Bobcat Stadium; San Marcos, TX	ESPN+	W 37–34 ^{3OT}	15,803
September 28	6:00 p.m.	No. 12 (FCS) Nicholls*	Bobcat Stadium; San Marcos, TX (Battle for the Paddle)	ESPN+	W 24–3	19,159
October 10	8:15 p.m.	Louisiana–Monroe	Bobcat Stadium; San Marcos, TX	ESPNU	L 14–24	16,783
October 26	6:00 p.m.	at Arkansas State	Centennial Bank Stadium; Jonesboro, AR	ESPN+	L 14–38	21,343
November 2	4:00 p.m.	at Louisiana	Cajun Field; Lafayette, LA	ESPN+	L 3–31	21,063
November 9	2:00 p.m.	South Alabama^{†}	Bobcat Stadium; San Marcos, TX	ESPN3	W 30–28	15,473
November 16	2:00 p.m.	Troy	Bobcat Stadium; San Marcos, TX	ESPN3	L 27–63	15,619
November 23	1:30 p.m.	at No. 24 Appalachian State	Kidd Brewer Stadium; Boone, NC	ESPN+	L 13–35	22,125
November 30	11:00 a.m.	at Coastal Carolina	Brooks Stadium; Conway, SC	ESPN+	L 21–24	15,102
*Non-conference game; ^{†}Homecoming; Rankings from AP Poll and CFP Rankings after November 5 released prior to game; All times are in Central time

== Game summaries ==
=== At No. 12 Texas A&M ===
Texas State Bobcats at No. 12 Texas A&M Aggies – Game summary

Quarter	1	2	3	4	Total
Bobcats	0	0	0	7	7
No. 12 Aggies	14	14	3	10	41

at Kyle Field, College Station, Texas

- Date: August 29
- Game time: 7:30 p.m. CDT
- Game weather: Thunder in vicinity, 93 °F (34 °C)
- Game attendance: 98,016
- Referee: Matt Loeffler
- TV announcers (SECN): Tom Hart, Jordan Rodgers, and Cole Cubelic
- Box score, Recap

Game information
First quarter
- TAMU – Quartney Davis 21-yard pass from Kellen Mond (Seth Small kick), 7:44. Aggies 7–0. Drive: 9 plays, 72 yards, 4:11.
- TAMU – Joshua Corbin 1-yard run (Seth Small kick), 2:16. Aggies 14–0. Drive: 6 plays, 42 yards, 2:54.

Second quarter

- TAMU – Kellen Mond 5-yard run (Seth Small kick), 7:25. Aggies 21–0. Drive: 5 plays, 40 yards, 2:41.
- TAMU – Joshua Corbin 3-yard pass from Kellen Mond (Seth Small kick), 3:05. Aggies 28–0. Drive: 5 plays, 42 yards, 2:12.

Third quarter

- TAMU – Seth Small 22-yard field goal, 3:37. Aggies 31–0. Drive: 8 plays, 25 yards, 4:21.

Fourth quarter

- TAMU – Jhamon Ausbon 1-yard pass from Kellen Mond (Seth Small kick), 14:55. Aggies 38–0. Drive: 4 plays, 94 yards, 1:23.
- TAMU – Seth Small 26-yard field goal, 4:57. Aggies 41–0. Drive: 10 plays, 48 yards, 4:51.
- TXST – Trevis Graham Jr. 22-yard pass from Gresch Jensen (Joshua Rowland kick), 0:36. Aggies 41–7. Drive: 11 plays, 84 yards, 4:21.

Statistics	TXST	TAMU
First downs	15	22
Total yards	219	478
Rushing yards	8	246
Passing yards	211	232
Turnovers	4	2
Time of possession	24:14	35:46

Team	Category	Player	Statistics
Texas State	Passing	Gresch Jensen	20/31, 160 yards, TD, 2 INT
Texas State	Rushing	A. D. Taylor	7 rushes, 19 yards
Texas State	Receiving	Hutch White	7 receptions, 60 yards
Texas A&M	Passing	Kellen Mond	19/27, 194 yards, 3 TD, INT
Texas A&M	Rushing	Isaiah Spiller	7 rushes, 106 yards
Texas A&M	Receiving	Quartney Davis	6 receptions, 85 yards, TD

=== Wyoming ===
Wyoming Cowboys at Texas State Bobcats – Game summary

Quarter	1	2	3	4	Total
Cowboys	0	10	10	3	23
Bobcats	7	7	0	0	14

at Bobcat Stadium, San Marcos, Texas

- Date: September 7
- Game time: 6:00 p.m. CDT
- Game weather: Sunny, 99 °F (37 °C)
- Game attendance: 18,003
- Referee: Jason Autrey
- TV: ESPN+
- Box score, Recap

Game information
First quarter
- TXST – Caleb Twyford 1-yard run (Joshua Rowland kick), 9:57. Bobcats 7–0. Drive: 6 plays, 74 yards, 1:51.

Second quarter

- WYO – Cooper Rothe 47-yard field goal, 12:59. Bobcats 7–3. Drive: 10 plays, 50 yards, 4:08.
- TXST – Jah'Marae Sheread 50-yard pass from Gresch Jensen (Joshua Rowland kick), 11:15. Bobcats 14–3. Drive: 5 plays, 75 yards, 1:44.
- WYO – Sean Chambers 7-yard run (Cooper Rothe kick), 2:56. Bobcats 14–10. Drive: 6 plays, 46 yards, 2:58.

Third quarter

- WYO – Cooper Rothe 37-yard field goal, 10:44. Bobcats 14–13. Drive: 7 plays, 42 yards, 2:56.
- WYO – Tyler Hall 72-yard interception return (Cooper Rothe kick), 8:36. Cowboys 20–14.

Fourth quarter

- WYO – Cooper Rothe 19-yard field goal, 10:19. Wyoming 23–14. Drive: 18 plays, 88 yards, 9:12.

Statistics	WYO	TXST
First downs	16	27
Total yards	293	444
Rushing yards	190	50
Passing yards	103	394
Turnovers	1	3
Time of possession	34:27	25:33

Team	Category	Player	Statistics
Wyoming	Passing	Sean Chambers	8/18, 103 yards, INT
Wyoming	Rushing	Trey Smith	16 rushes, 54 yards
Wyoming	Receiving	Gunner Gentry	1 reception, 44 yards
Texas State	Passing	Gresch Jensen	33/54, 394 yards, TD, 2 INT
Texas State	Rushing	Caleb Twyford	10 rushes, 60 yards, TD
Texas State	Receiving	Hutch White	10 receptions, 96 yards

=== At SMU ===
Texas State Bobcats at SMU Mustangs – Game summary

Quarter	1	2	3	4	Total
Bobcats	3	0	7	7	17
Mustangs	7	6	21	13	47

at Gerald J. Ford Stadium, University Park, Texas

- Date: September 14
- Game time: 6:00 p.m. CDT
- Game weather: Partly cloudy, 97 °F (36 °C)
- Game attendance: 17,469
- Referee: A. Calabrese
- TV: ESPN3
- Box score, Recap

Game information

First quarter

- (11:47) SMU TD – James Proche 4-yard pass frokm Shane Buechele, Luke Hogan kick
  Southern Methodist 7–0; Drive: 7 plays, 74 yards, 3:13
- (08:13) TXST FG – Joshua Rowland 27-yard fiedl goal
  Southern Methodist 7–3; Drive: 4 plays, 9 yards, 1:17

Second quarter

- (13:02) SMU TD – TJ McDaniel 10-yard rush, Luke Hogan PAT blocked
  Southern Methodist 13–3; Drive: 6 plays, 78 yards, 2:09

Third quarter

- (12:44) SMU TD – Xavier Jones 1-yard rush, Luke Hogan kick
  Southern Methodist 20–3; Drive: 4 plays, 64 yards, 1:09
- (07:26) SMU TD – TJ McDaniel 39-yard rush, Luke Hogan kick
  Southern Methodist 27–3; Drive: 4 plays, 64 yards, 1:30
- (04:29) TXST TD – Anthony D. Taylor 10-yard pass from Gresch Jensen, Joshua Rowland kick
  Southern Methodist 27–10; Drive: 7 plays, 65 yards, 2:57
- (00:06) SMU TD – TJ McDaniel 42-yard rush, Luke Hogan kick
  Southern Methodist 34–10; Drive: 3 plays, 51 yards, 1:09

Fourth quarter

- (12:32) SMU TD – Kylen Granson 58-yard pass frokm Shane Buechele, Luke Hogan PAT failed
  Southern Methodist 40–10; Drive: 1 play, 58 yards, 0:10
- (05:50) TXST TD – Caleb Twyford 35-yard pass from Tyler Vitt, Joshua Rowland kick
  Southern Methodist 40–17; Drive: 3 plays, 37 yards, 1:02
- (00:38) SMU TD – Merek Pierce 4-yard rush, Luke Hogan kick
  Southern Methodist 47–17; Drive: 10 plays, 68 yards, 5:11

Top passers

- TXST – Gresch Jensen – 22/37, 185 yards, TD, INT
- SMU – Shane Buechele – 14/18, 219 yards, 2 TD, 2 INT

Top rushers

- TXST – Caleb Twyford – 11 carries, 25 yards
- SMU – TJ McDaniel – 8 carries, 159 yards, 3 TD

Top receivers

- TXST – Caleb Twyford – 3 receptions, 53 yards, TD
- SMU – Reggie Roberson Jr. – 4 receptions, 68 yards

Statistics	Texas State	SMU
First downs	15	23
Total yards	242	639
Rushing yards	17	390
Passing yards	225	249
Turnovers	1	3
Time of possession	29:06	30:54

=== Georgia State ===
Georgia State Panthers at Texas State Bobcats – Game summary

Quarter	1	2	3	4	OT	2OT	3OT	Total
Panthers	7	10	0	10	7	0	0	34
Bobcats	10	7	3	7	7	0	3	37

at Bobcat Stadium, San Marcos, Texas

- Date: September 21
- Game time: 6:00 p.m. CDT
- Game weather: Sunny, 91 °F (33 °C)
- Game attendance: 15,803
- Referee: Jeremy Parker
- TV announcers (ESPN+): Brant Freeman, Joplo Bartu, and Brooke Shoemaker
- Box score, Recap

Game information

First quarter

- (13:14) TXST FG – Joshua Rowland 45-yard field goal
  Texas State 3–0; Drive: 4 plays, -2 yards, 1:01
- (08:30) GSU TD – Cornelius McCoy 17-yard pass from Dan Ellington, Brandon Wright kick
  Georgia State 7–3; Drive: 10 plays, 75 yards, 4:44
- (02:55) TXST TD – Javen Banks 0-yard fumble returned, Joshua Rowland kick
  Texas State 10–7; Drive: 0 plays, 0 yards, 0:00

Second quarter

- (09:09) GSU TD – Aubry Payne 5-yard pass from Dan Ellington, Brandon Wright kick
  Georgia State 14–10; Drive: 9 plays, 73 yards, 3:33
- (03:43) TXST TD – Anthony D. Taylor 2-yard rush, Joshua Rowland kick
  Texas State 17–14; Drive: 15 plays, 75 yards, 5:26
- (00:00) GSU FG – Brandon Wright 37-yard field goal
  Tied 17–17; Drive: 13 plays, 50 yards, 3:43

Third quarter

- (05:11) TXST FG – Joshua Rowland 34-yard field goal
  Texas State 20–17; Drive: 7 plays, 33 yards, 2:40

Fourth quarter

- (08:05) GSU TD – Destin Coates 7-yard rush, Brandon Wright kick
  Georgia State 24–20; Drive: 13 plays, 56 yards, 6:48
- (04:56) TXST TD – Anthony D. Taylor 20-yard rush, Joshua Rowland kick
  Texas State 27–24; Drive: 7 plays, 75 yards, 3:09
- (00:00) GSU FG – Brandon Wright 20-yard field goal
  Tied 27–27; Drive: 14 plays, 76 yards, 4:49

First overtime

- GSU TD – Sam Pinckney 13-yard pass from Dan Ellington, Brandon Wright kick
  Georgia State 34–27; Drive: 4 plays, 25 yards, 0:00
- TXST TD – Gresch Jensen 1-yard rush, Joshua Rowland kick
  Tied 34–34; Drive: 5 plays, 25 yards, 0:00

Third overtime

- TXST FG – Joshua Rowland 35-yard field goal
  Texas State 37–14; Drive: 4 plays, 7 yards, 0:00

Top passers

- GSU – Dan Ellington – 24/39, 219 yards, 3 TD, INT
- TXST – Gresch Jensen – 16/25, 129 yards

Top rushers

- GSU – Destin Coates – 21 carries, 95 yards, TD
- TXST – Caleb Twyford – 27 carries, 137 yards

Top receivers

- GSU – Sam Pinckney – 7 receptions, 95 yards, TD
- TXST – Jah'Marae Sheread – 3 receptions, 38 yards

Statistics	Georgia State	Texas State
First downs	27	20
Total yards	423	350
Rushing yards	204	221
Passing yards	219	129
Turnovers	3	0
Time of possession	34:46	25:14

=== No. 12 (FCS) Nicholls ===
No. 12 (FCS) Nicholls Colonels at Texas State Bobcats – Game summary

Quarter	1	2	3	4	Total
No. 12 (FCS) Colonels	0	3	0	0	3
Bobcats	7	7	0	0	14

at Bobcat Stadium, San Marcos, Texas

- Date: September 28
- Game time: 6:00 p.m. CDT
- Game weather: Partly cloudy, 86 °F (30 °C)
- Game attendance: 19,159
- Referee: Kyle Olson
- TV: ESPN3
- Box score, Recap

Game information
First quarter
- TXST – Joshua Rowland 36-yard field goal, 8:15. Bobcats 3–0. Drive: 9 plays, 46 yards, 5:12.

Second quarter

- NICH – Gunnar Jones 39-yard field goal, 13:05. Tied 3–3. Drive: 14 plays, 60 yards, 6:42.

Third quarter

- TXST – Micah Hilts 12-yard pass from Gresch Jensen (Joshua Rowland kick), 9:20. Bobcats 10–3. Drive: 14 plays, 78 yards, 5:32.
- TXST – Gresch Jensen 1-yard run (Joshua Rowland kick), 6:42. Bobcats 17–3. Drive: 6 plays, 56 yards, 1:56.

Fourth quarter

- TXST – Javen Banks 77-yard pass from Gresch Jenssen (Joshua Rowland kick), 14:02. Bobcats 24–3. Drive: 2 plays, 80 yards, 0:45.

Statistics	NICH	TXST
First downs	12	16
Total yards	220	362
Rushing yards	75	109
Passing yards	145	253
Turnovers	2	1
Time of possession	27:17	32:43

Team	Category	Player	Statistics
Nicholls	Passing	Chase Fourcade	15/27, 145 yards, INT
Nicholls	Rushing	Chase Fourcade	8 rushes, 25 yards
Nicholls	Receiving	Dai'Jean Dixon	5 receptions, 54 yards
Texas State	Passing	Gresch Jensen	22/29, 253 yards, 2 TD, INT
Texas State	Rushing	Caleb Twyford	17 rushes, 73 yards
Texas State	Receiving	Javen Banks	1 reception, 77 yards, TD

=== Louisiana–Monroe ===
Louisiana–Monroe at Texas State – Game summary

Quarter	1	2	3	4	Total
Warhawks	7	10	0	7	24
Bobcats	0	7	7	0	14

at Bobcat Stadium, San Marcos, TX

- Date: October 10
- Game time: 8:00 p.m. CDT
- Game weather: 89 °F (32 °C); clear
- Game attendance: 16,783
- Referee: Marshall Lewis
- TV: ESPNU

Game information

First quarter

- (12:13) ULM TD – Josh Johnson 1-yard rush, Jared Porter kick
  Louisiana–Monroe 7–0; Drive: 7 plays, 75 yards, 2:47

Second quarter

- (13:15) ULM TD – Josh Johnson 8-yard rush, Jared Porter kick
  Louisiana–Monroe 14–0; Drive: 11 plays, 80 yards, 4:55
- (09:13) TXST TD – Calvin Hill 3-yard rush, Joshua Rowland kick
  Louisiana–Monroe 14–7; Drive: 12 plays, 75 yards, 4:12
- (05:31) ULM FG – Jared Porter 34-yard field goal
  Louisiana–Monroe 17–7; Drive: 9 plays, 68 yards, 3:27

Third quarter

- (00:54) TXST TD – Trevis Graham Jr. 62-yard pass from Tyler Vitt, Joshua Rowland kick
  Louisiana–Monroe 17–14; Drive: 1 play, 62 yards, 0:11

Fourth quarter

- (01:46) ULM TD – Austin Vaughn 11-yard rush, Jared Porter kick
  Louisiana–Monroe 24–14; Drive: 13 plays, 86 yards, 6:41

Top passers

- ULM – Caleb Evans – 18/33, 225 yards, INT
- TXST – Gresch Jensen – 16/30, 170 yards

Top rushers

- ULM – Josh Johnson – 22 carries, 114 yards, 2 TD
- TXST – Caleb Twyford – 10 carries, 78 yards

Top receivers

- ULM – Malik Jackson – 5 receptions, 55 yards
- TXST – Trevis Graham Jr. – 2 receptions, 69 yards, TD

Statistics	Louisiana–Monroe	Texas State
First downs	24	17
Total yards	429	338
Rushing yards	204	92
Passing yards	225	246
Turnovers	2	2
Time of possession	33:06	26:54

=== At Arkansas State ===
Texas State at Arkansas State – Game summary

Quarter	1	2	3	4	Total
Bobcats	0	14	0	0	14
Red Wolves	7	10	14	7	38

at Centennial Bank Stadium, Jonesboro, AR

- Date: October 26
- Game time: 6:00 p.m. CDT
- Game weather: 55 °F (13 °C); overcast
- Game attendance: 21,343
- Referee: Marshall Lewis
- TV: ESPN+

Game information

First quarter

- (05:01) ARST TD – Omar Bayless 13-yard pass from Layne Hatcher, Blake Grupe kick
  Arkansas State 7–0; Drive: 18 plays, 99 yards, 7:22

Second quarter

- (14:53) ARST FG – Blake Grupe 20-yard field goal
  Arkansas State 10–0; Drive: 4 plays, -1 yards, 0:52
- (09:22) ARST TD – Jamal Jones 7-yard rush, Blake Grupe kick
  Arkansas State 17–0; Drive: 8 plays, 64 yards, 3:18
- (07:06) TXST TD – Caleb Twyford 2-yard rush, Joshua Rowland kick
  Arkansas State 17–7; Drive: 7 plays, 65 yards, 2:16
- (01:58) TXST TD – Hutch White 6-yard pass from Tyler Vitt, Joshua Rowland kick
  Arkansas State 17–14; Drive: 7 plays, 64 yards, 2:10

Third quarter

- (10:31) ARST TD – Marcel Murray 13-yard rush, Blake Grupe kick
  Arkansas State 24–14; Drive: 1 play, 13 yards, 0:07
- (04:19) ARST TD – Marcel Murray 16-yard rush, Blake Grupe kick
  Arkansas State 31–14; Drive: 1 play, 16 yards, 0:09

Fourth quarter

- (09:48) ARST TD – Omar Bayless 2-yard pass from Layne Hatcher, Blake Grupe kick
  Arkansas State 38–14; Drive: 13 plays, 66 yards, 6:03

Top passers

- TXST – Tyler Vitt – 15/27, 146 yards, TD, 2 INT
- ARST – Layne Hatcher – 18/28, 158 yards, 2 TD

Top rushers

- TXST – Caleb Twyford – 16 carries, 76 yards, TD
- ARST – Marcel Murray – 22 carries, 114 yards, 2 TD

Top receivers

- TXST – Jeremiah Haydel – 3 receptions, 56 yards
- ARST – Omar Bayless – 7 receptions, 77 yards, 2 TD

Statistics	Texas State	Arkansas State
First downs	8	21
Total yards	227	364
Rushing yards	81	206
Passing yards	146	158
Turnovers	3	0
Time of possession	22:40	37:20

=== At Louisiana ===
Texas State at Louisiana – Game summary

Quarter	1	2	3	4	Total
Bobcats	0	3	0	0	3
Ragin' Cajuns	0	10	21	0	31

at Cajun Field, Lafayette, LA

- Date: November 2
- Game time: 4:00 p.m. CST
- Game weather: 62 °F (17 °C); sunny; 12 N MPH
- Game attendance: 21,063
- Referee: Jeremy Parker
- TV: ESPN+

Game information

Second quarter

- (06:28) LA TD – Elijah Mitchell 39-yard rush, Stevie Artigue kick
  Louisiana 7–0; Drive: 6 plays, 68 yards, 2:16
- (01:44) TXST FG – Joshua Rowland 33-yard field goal
  Louisiana 7–3; Drive: 10 plays, 60 yards, 4:44
- (00:00) LA FG – Stevie Artigue 46-yard field goal
  Louisiana 10–3; Drive: 10 plays, 50 yards, 1:44

Third quarter

- (12:43) LA TD – Nick Ralston 24-yard pass from Levi Lewis
  Louisiana 17–3; Drive: 5 plays, 62 yards, 2:17
- (03:32) LA TD – Chris Smith 24-yard rush, Stevie Artigue kick
  Louisiana 24–3; Drive: 12 plays, 83 yards, 5:42
- (00:40) LA TD – Raymond Calais 34-yard pass from Levi Lewis, Stevie Artigue kick
  Louisiana 31–3; Drive: 4 plays, 60 yards, 1:34

Top passers

- TXST – Tyler Vitt – 24/34, 206 yards, 2 INT
- LA – Levi Lewis – 13/21, 183 yards, 2 TD

Top rushers

- TXST – Tyler Vitt – 10 carries, 38 yards
- LA – Elijah Mitchell – 13 carries, 126 yards, TD

Top receivers

- TXST – Trevis Graham Jr. – 6 receptions, 52 yards
- LA – Jalen Williams – 3 receptions, 50 yards

Statistics	Texas State	Louisiana
First downs	17	24
Total yards	264	479
Rushing yards	58	296
Passing yards	206	183
Turnovers	2	1
Time of possession	29:28	30:32

=== South Alabama ===
South Alabama at Texas State – Game summary

Quarter	1	2	3	4	Total
Jaguars	7	7	7	7	28
Bobcats	3	10	14	3	30

at Bobcat Stadium, San Marcos, TX

- Date: November 9
- Game time: 2:00 p.m. CDT
- Game attendance: 15,473
- Referee: Jason Autrey
- TV announcers (ESPN3): Brant Freeman (play-by-play), Joplo Bartu (analyst) and Brooke Shoemaker (sideline)

Game information

First quarter

- (09:49) TXST FG – Joshua Rowland 20-yard field goal
  Texas State 3–0; Drive: 9 plays, 47 yards, 3:16
- (01:47) USA TD – Carlos Davis 3-yard rush, Frankie Onate kick
  South Alabama 7–3; Drive: 9 plays, 77 yards, 4:13

Second quarter

- (12:03) TXST FG – Joshua Rowland 41-yard field goal
  South Alabama 7–6; Drive: 11 plays, 52 yards, 4:37
- (03:09) TXST TD – Javen Banks 40-yard pass from Tyler Vitt, Joshua Rowland kick
  Texas State 13–7; Drive: 8 plays, 92 yards, 3:51
- (00:35) USA TD – Davyn Flenord 22-yard pass from Desmond Trotter, Frankie Onate kick
  South Alabama 14–13; Drive: 9 plays, 78 yards, 2:26

Third quarter

- (12:24) TXST TD – Trevis Graham Jr. 38-yard pass from Tyler Vitt, Joshua Rowland kick
  Texas State 20–14; Drive: 6 plays, 75 yards, 2:36
- (07:07) USA TD – Jalen Wayne 8-yard pass from Desmond Trotter, Frankie Onate kick
  South Alabama 21–20; Drive: 11 plays, 75 yards, 5:17
- (04:36) TXST TD – Trevis Graham Jr. 17-yard pass from Tyler Vitt, Joshua Rowland kick
  Texas State 27–21; Drive: 6 plays, 60 yards, 2:23

Fourth quarter

- (09:57) USA TD – Tra Minter 6-yard rush, Frankie Onate kick
  South Alabama 28–27; Drive: 12 plays, 73 yards, 5:40
- (06:14) TXST FG – Joshua Rowland 31-yard field goal
  Texas State 30–28; Drive: 7 plays, 21 yards, 3:30

Top passers

- USA – Desmond Trotter – 13/17, 164 yards, 2 TD
- TXST – Tyler Vitt – 23/33, 373 yards, 3 TD, INT

Top rushers

- USA – Tra Minter – 21 carries, 87 yards, TD
- TXST – Tyler Vitt – 11 carries, 42 yards

Top receivers

- USA – Kawaan Baker – 4 receptions, 34 yards
- TXST – Hutch White – 10 receptions, 165 yards

Statistics	South Alabama	Texas State
First downs	20	21
Total yards	348	415
Rushing yards	184	42
Passing yards	164	373
Turnovers	0	2
Time of possession	30:00	30:00

=== Troy ===
Troy at Texas State – Game summary

Quarter	1	2	3	4	Total
Trojans	14	21	7	21	63
Bobcats	3	7	10	7	27

at Bobcat Stadium, San Marcos, TX

- Date: November 16
- Game time: 2:00 p.m. CDT
- Game weather: 65 °F (18 °C); partly cloudy
- Game attendance: 15,619
- Referee: Wayne Winkler
- TV: ESPN3

Game information

First quarter

- (07:30) TXST FG – Joshua Rowland 33-yard field goal
  Texas State 3–0; Drive: 11 plays, 50 yards, 5:42
- (03:44) TROY TD – Trevon Woolfork 13-yard pass from Kaleb Barker, Tyler Sumpter kick
  Troy 7–3; Drive: 11 plays, 83 yards, 3:39
- (00:03) TROY TD – AJ Lewis 3-yard pass from Kaleb Barker, Tyler Sumpter kick
  Troy 14–3; Drive: 4 plays, 53 yards, 1:20

Second quarter

- (13:30) TXST TD – Robert Brown Jr. 21-yard rush, Joshua Rowland kick
  Troy 14–10; Drive: 4 plays, 57 yards, 1:30
- (08:56) TROY TD – Reggie Todd 38-yard pass from Kaleb Barker, Tyler Sumpter kick
  Troy 21–10; Drive: 5 plays, 50 yards, 1:24
- (06:34) TROY TD – Trevon Woolfork 13-yard pass from Kaleb Barker, Tyler Sumpter kick
  Troy 28–10; Drive: 6 plays, 57 yards, 1:26
- (02:20) TROY TD – Luke Whittemore 1-yard pass from Kaleb Barker, Tyler Sumpter kick
  Troy 35–10; Drive: 5 plays, 47 yards, 1:10

Third quarter

- (09:42) TROY TD – Khalil McClain 2-yard pass from Kaleb Barker, Tyler Sumpter kick
  Troy 42–10; Drive: 10 plays, 48 yards, 3:43
- (07:46) TXST FG – Joshua Rowland 35-yard field goal
  Troy 42–13; Drive: 7 plays, 57 yards, 1:56
- (02:08) TXST TD – Hutch White 35-yard pass from Tyler Vitt, Joshua Rowland kick
  Troy 42–20; Drive: 8 plays, 83 yards, 3:47

Fourth quarter

- (13:26) TROY TD – Jabir Daughtry-Frye 6-yard rush, Tyler Sumpter kick
  Troy 49–20; Drive: 8 plays, 82 yards, 3:36
- (09:40) TXST TD – Javen Banks 39-yard pass from Tyler Vitt, Joshua Rowland kick
  Troy 49–27; Drive: 2 plays, 50 yards, 0:30
- (01:41) TROY TD – Trevon Woolfolk 2-yard rush, Evan Legassey kick
  Troy 56–27; Drive: 8 plays, 39 yards, 5:18
- (00:08) TROY TD – Carlton Martial 64-yard interception returned, Evan Legassey kick
  Troy 63–27; Drive: 5 plays, 30 yards, 1:21

Top passers

- TROY – Kaleb Barker – 30/43, 363 yards, 6 TD
- TXST – Tyler Vitt – 29/44, 263 yards, 2 TD, 4 INT

Top rushers

- TROY – DK Billingsley – 12 carries, 40 yards
- TXST – Robert Brown Jr. – 4 carries, 67 yards, TD

Top receivers

- TROY – Kaylon Geiger – 8 receptions, 61 yards
- TXST – Hutch White – 7 receptions, 80 yards, TD

Statistics	Troy	Texas State
First downs	25	21
Total yards	471	416
Rushing yards	103	153
Passing yards	368	263
Turnovers	0	4
Time of possession	31:27	28:33

=== At Appalachian State ===
Appalachian State at Texas A&M – Game summary

Quarter	1	2	3	4	Total
Bobcats	0	10	3	0	13
No. 24 Mountaineers	7	7	14	7	35

at Kidd Brewer Stadium, Boone, NC

- Date: November 23
- Game time: 1:30 p.m. CDT
- Game weather: 44 °F (7 °C); rain and cold
- Game attendance: 22,125
- Referee: Kyle Olson
- TV: ESPN+

Game information

First quarter

- (07:09) APST TD – Corey Sutton 45-yard pass from Zac Thomas, Chandler Staton kick
  Appalachian State 7–0; Drive: 7 plays, 87 yards, 3:25

Second quarter

- (12:43) TXST FG – Joshua Rowland 48-yard field goal
  Appalachian State 7–3; Drive: 4 plays, -1 yards, 1:35
- (01:00) APST TD – Keishawn Watson 19-yard pass from Zac Thomas, Chandler Staton kick
  Appalachian State 14–3; Drive: 4 plays, 59 yards, 2:25
- (00:03) TXST TD – Javen Banks 53-yard pass from Tyler Vitt, Joshua Rowland kick
  Appalachian State 14–10; Drive: 3 plays, 65 yards, 0:54

Third quarter

- (09:05) TXST FG – Joshua Rowland 48-yard field goal
  Appalachian State 14–13; Drive: 10 plays, 26 yards, 4:30
- (05:32) APST TD – Darrynton Evans 13-yard rush, Chandler Staton kick
  Appalachian State 21–13; Drive: 4 plays, 29 yards, 2:20
- (00:00) APST TD – Darrynton Evans 10-yard rush, Chandler Staton kick
  Appalachian State 28–13; Drive: 6 plays, 67 yards, 0:00

Fourth quarter

- (06:26) APST TD – Darrynton Evans 13-yard rush, Chandler Staton kick
  Appalachian State 35–13; Drive: 12 plays, 86 yards, 6:52

Top passers

- TXST – Tyler Vitt – 18/34, 154 yards, TD, INT
- APST – Zac Thomas – 8/16, 174 yards, 2 TD

Top rushers

- TXST – Robert Brown Jr. – 8 carries, 35 yards
- APST – Darrynton Evans – 21 carries, 154 yards, 3 TD

Top receivers

- TXST – Javen Banks – 5 receptions, 82 yards, TD
- APST – Thomas Hennigan – 2 receptions, 70 yards

Statistics	Texas State	Appalachain State
First downs	11	23
Total yards	208	468
Rushing yards	54	280
Passing yards	154	188
Turnovers	1	1
Time of possession	26:55	33:05

=== At Coastal Carolina ===
Texas State at Coastal Carolina – Game summary

Quarter	1	2	3	4	Total
Bobcats	0	7	0	14	21
Chanticleers	0	7	7	10	24

at Brooks Stadium, Conway, SC

- Date: November 30
- Game time: 11:00 a.m. CDT
- Game weather: partly cloudy
- Game attendance: 15,102
- Referee: Jason Autrey
- TV: ESPN+

Game information

Second quarter

- (07:39) CCU TD – Shadell Bell 1-yard pass from Fred Payton, Massimo Biscardi kick
  Coastal Carolina 7–0; Drive: 13 plays, 64 yards, 6:24
- (03:07) TXST TD – Mason Hays 64-yard pass from Tyler Vitt, Alan Orona kick
  Tied 7–7; Drive: 1 play, 64 yards, 0:11

Third quarter

- (03:42) CCU TD – Isaiah Likely 28-yard pass from Bryce Carpenter, Massimo Biscardi kick
  Coastal Carolina 14–7; Drive: 11 plays, 71 yards, 6:23

Fourth quarter

- (11:30) CCU FG – Massimo Biscardi 47-yard field goal
  Coastal Carolina 17–7; Drive: 11 plays, 50 yards, 6:02
- (09:38) TXST TD – Tyler Vitt 8-yard pass from Hutch White, Alan Orona kick
  Coastal Carolina 17–14; Drive: 4 plays, 67 yards, 1:44
- (04:03) CCU TD – CJ Marable 3-yard rush, Massimo Biscardi kick
  Coastal Carolina 24–14; Drive: 10 plays, 69 yards, 5:25
- (01:31) TXST TD – Jacoby Hopkins 18-yard pass from Tyler Vitt, Alan Orona kick
  Coastal Carolina 24–21; Drive: 9 plays, 71 yards, 2:24

Top passers

- TXST – Tyler Vitt – 23/33, 285 yards, 2 TD, INT
- CCU – Bryan Carpenter – 10/11, 114 yards, TD

Top rushers

- TXST – Robert Brown Jr. – 6 carries, 24 yards
- CCU – CJ Marable – 25 carries, 121 yards, TD

Top receivers

- TXST – Mason Hays – 5 receptions, 117 yards, TD
- CCU – Isaiah Likely – 6 receptions, 107 yards, TD

Statistics	Texas State	Coastal Carolina
First downs	17	22
Total yards	329	380
Rushing yards	36	223
Passing yards	293	157
Turnovers	1	0
Time of possession	19:36	40:24

== Roster ==
2019 Texas State Bobcats football team roster
Players
Coaches
Offense

Pos.	#	Name	Class
WR	1	Jah"Marae Sheread	Fr
QB	2	Gresch Jensen	Jr
WR	3	Jeremiah Haydel	Jr
WR	4	Dylan Jantz	Fr
RB	5	Jaylin Nelson	Jr
QB	6	Cedric Case	Fr
QB	7	Jaylen Gipson	So
WR	8	Jacoby Hopkins	Fr
WR	9	Lester James	Fr
WR	10	Mason Hays	Sr
QB	11	Tyler Vitt	So
WR	12	Javen Banks	So
WR	13	Trevis Graham Jr.	So
QB	14	Brady McBride	So
WR	15	Blake Aragon	Fr
WR	16	Kenny Frazier	Fr
QB	17	D. J. Bolger	Fr
QB	18	Ezekiel Coss	Fr
RB	21	Anthony Smith	So
RB	22	Calvin Hill	Fr
RB	23	Robert Brown Jr.	Jr
WR	24	Caleb Twyford	Jr
RB	25	Anthony D. Taylor	Sr
WR	28	Lincoln Warren	Sr
RB	33	Cade Powell	Fr
RB	34	Alec Harris	Fr
RB	41	LeDarrius Harris	Sr
TE	49	Hunter Hebert	So
OL	50	Reece Jordan	Jr
OL	53	Eddie Rivas	So
OL	54	David Tachie	Sr
OL	55	Aaron Brewer	Sr
OL	56	Morgan Moore	So
OL	62	Jacob Fryrear	Jr
OL	65	Kameron Jemison	Jr
OL	67	Ronald Copney	Fr
OL	69	Tanner King	So
OL	71	Tate Heitmeier	So
OL	72	Jacob Rowland	Sr
OL	73	Dalton Cooper	Fr
OL	75	Chris Julson	Fr
OL	76	Kylar Cooks	Fr
OL	79	Jayden Smith	Fr
WR	80	Hutch White	Sr
WR	81	Chandler Speights	So
WR	83	Micah Hilts	Fr
TE	84	Seth Caillouet	Fr
WR	86	Peyton Tuggle	Jr
TE	87	Jackson Lanam	Fr
WR	88	Sevonne Rhea	Fr

Defense

Pos.	#	Name	Class
DB	2	Alvin Pacheco	Sr
CB	3	Kordell Rodgers	Jr
LB	4	Gavin Graham	Sr
DB	5	Kevin Anderson	Fr
CB	6	Anthony J. Taylor	Sr
LB	7	Kumonde Hines	Sr
LB	8	Hal Vinson	Sr
LB	9	Bryan London II	Sr
S	10	Auston Deason	So
DE	11	Ishmael Davis	Sr
LB	12	Clifton Lewis Jr.	Sr
DB	13	DeJordan Mask	Fr
S	14	Pierce Withers	Fr
DB	15	Jarron Morris	So
CB	16	Jashon Waddy	Sr
S	17	Jared Hopper	Fr
LB	18	Frankie Griffin	Sr
DB	20	Khambrail Winters	Fr
S	21	Josh Newman	Jr
LB	22	Markeveon Coleman	Jr
S	23	Preston Dimery	Jr
S	24	Jalen Smith	Sr
OLB	25	Devin Martinez	Fr
CB	26	Kieston Roach	So
OLB	27	London Harris	So
DB	28	C. J. Johnson	Fr
LB	30	Nikolas Daniels	Sr
LB	33	Kenny Haynes	Fr
DB	35	Ashton Johnson	Fr
ILB	40	Malik Alley	Sr
LB	43	Mitchell Dunahoo	Fr
ILB	44	John Brannon	Jr
DE	45	Jakharious Smith	So
ILB	54	Hunter Thompson	So
LB	57	Zane Little	Fr
DL	59	Nick Wilkins	So
DT	88	Caeveon Patton	Jr
DL	90	Jake Lynch	Fr
DL	91	Jordan Revels	Fr
DL	92	Devin Henderson	Fr
DL, TE	93	Dotson Schaefer	Fr
DL	94	J. T. Greer	Fr
DL	94	Jaquel Pierce	Jr
DL	95	Nico Ezidore	So
DL	96	Kingsley Onyirioha	Sr
DE	97	Emmanuel Galvan-Vazquez	So
NT	98	Gjemar Daniels	Jr
NT	99	John Lilly	Jr

Special teams

Pos.	#	Name	Class
K	14	Joshua Rowland	Sr
K	37	Alan Orona	Fr
K	38	Seth Keller	So
P	38	Seamus O'Kelly	Fr
P	39	Clayton Stewart	So
LS	42	Alex Lipps	So
LS	46	Justin Warner	Sr
K, P	48	Foster Hilborn	So

Head coach

- Jake Spavital (Missouri State)

Coordinators/assistant coaches

- Bob Stitt (Doane College)
  Offensive coordinator
- Zac Spavital (Murray State)
  Defensive coordinator
- Archie McDaniel (Texas A&M)
  Co-defensive coordinator/inside linebackers
- Nick Whitworth (Idaho State)
  Special teams coordinator/running backs
- Brett Dewhurst (Texas Tech)
  Defensive backs
- Clay McGuire (Texas Tech)
  Offensive line
- Tevin Mims (Texas Tech)
  Outside linebackers
- Patrick Doherty (Franklin College)
  Offensive/special teams analyst
- Boone Feldt (Texas–Permian Basin)
  Offensive graduate assistant
- Joseph Kirchon (King's College)
  Offensive graduate assistant
- Zach McCarthy (Texas State)
  Defensive graduate assistant
- Adrian McDonald (Houston)
  Defensive graduate assistant
- Andrew Williams
  Strength and conditioning coach
- Kyle Vagher
  Strength and conditioning coach
- Andrew Johnson
  Director of equipment operations
- Sterling Price
  Assistant equipment manager
- Jake Macauley
  Video coordinator
- Mehrzad Sabzevari
  Assistant video coordinator
- Jeremy Cobb
  Head football athletic trainer
- Will Decraene
  Assistant athletic trainer
- James Sherman
  Director of player development
- Haleigh Blocker
  Director of football operations
- Connor Anderson
  Director of player personnel

Legend

- (C) Team captain
- (S) Suspended
- (I) Ineligible
- Injured
- Redshirt

Roster
Last update: May 12, 2020
