= 2019 Louisiana–Monroe Warhawks football team =

American college football season

2019 Louisiana–Monroe Warhawks football
- Conference: Sun Belt Conference
- West Division
- Record: 5–7 (4–4 Sun Belt)
- Head coach: Matt Viator (4th season)
- Offensive coordinator: Matt Kubik (4th season)
- Offensive scheme: Multiple
- Defensive coordinator: Mike Collins (4th season)
- Base defense: 4–2–5
- Home stadium: JPS Field at Malone Stadium

2019 Sun Belt Conference football standings
	Conf.			Overall
Team	W		L	W		L
East Division
No. 19 Appalachian State x$	7	–	1	13	–	1
Georgia Southern	5	–	3	7	–	6
Georgia State	4	–	4	7	–	6
Troy	3	–	5	5	–	7
Coastal Carolina	2	–	6	5	–	7
West Division
Louisiana x	7	–	1	11	–	3
Arkansas State	5	–	3	8	–	5
Louisiana–Monroe	4	–	4	5	–	7
Texas State	2	–	6	3	–	9
South Alabama	1	–	7	2	–	10
Championship: Appalachian State 45, Louisiana 38
$ – Conference champion; x – Division champion/co-champions; Rankings from AP Poll

The 2019 Louisiana–Monroe Warhawks football team represented University of Louisiana at Monroe in the 2019 NCAA Division I FBS football season. The Warhawks played their home games at Malone Stadium in Monroe, Louisiana, and competed in the West Division of the Sun Belt Conference. They were led by fourth-year head coach Matt Viator.

== Preseason ==
=== Sun Belt media poll ===
The Sun Belt coaches poll was released on July 18, 2019. Louisiana–Monroe was picked to finish third in the West Division.

=== Preseason All-Sun Belt teams ===
Offense

2nd team

- Caleb Evans - SR, Quarterback
- T. J. Fiailoa – R-SR, Offensive Line

== Personnel ==
2019 Louisiana–Monroe Warhawks football team roster
Players
Coaches
Offense

Pos.	#	Name	Class
RB	1	Javin Myers	So
WR	2	Malik Jackson	Fr
RB	3	Isaiah Phillips	Fr
WR	4	Brandius Batiste	Jr
RB	5	Jakyle Holmes	So
QB	6	Caleb Evans	Sr
WR	7	Zach Jackson	So
RB	8	Josh Johnson	Jr
WR	9	CJ Fletcher	So
WR	10	Jahquan Bloomfield	Fr
QB	12	Jordan Crumpton	Fr
WR	12	Markis McCray	Sr
TE	13	Tyler Darbonne	Fr
QB	13	Garrett Hable	Fr
WR	14	Perry Carter Jr.	So
QB	15	JT Jackson	Sr
QB	16	Colby Suits	Fr
WR	17	Xavier Brown	Sr
WR	18	Jonathan Hodoh	Jr
WR	19	Chandler Whitfield	Fr
RB	21	Charles Norman	Fr
RB	22	Zach Martin	Fr
RB	25	Kayin White	Jr
WR	26	Shamar Johnson	Fr
RB	29	Zach Murphy	Fr
RB	33	Austin Vaughn	Sr
RB	35	Kaydn Roach	Fr
RB	37	Josh Collins	Fr
G	51	Zach Breaux	Fr
C	56	Bobby Reynolds	Sr
OL	57	Colton Grove	Sr
OL	59	Victor Cutler	Fr
OT	64	Eastwood Thomas	Sr
G	65	Dakota Torbert	So
G	68	T.J. Fiailoa	Jr
OT	70	Blake Lodes	Fr
OT	72	Samuel Williams	Jr
OL	73	Chance Billington	Fr
OL	74	Evan Henry	Fr
C	75	John Bolding	Fr
OT	76	Conner Parsons	Fr
OT	77	Trace Ellison	Sr
G	78	Brandon Jones	Sr
WR	80	Will Derrick	So
WR	81	Chase Green	Jr
WR	82	Darin Turner	Jr
WR	83	Jaylan Beene	Jr
WR	83	Caleb Laboy	Jr
TE	85	Donavon Hickman	Jr
TE	86	Josh Pederson	Jr
TE	88	Tyler Lamm	Jr
TE	89	Cameron Darling	So

Defense

Pos.	#	Name	Class
S	1	Tyler Glass	Jr
S	2	Jabari Johnson	So
CB	3	Jordan Oliver	Fr
LB	4	Rashaad Harding	Jr
DE	5	Kerry Starks	Jr
S	6	Keilos Swinney	Jr
LB	7	Cortez Sisco Jr.	Sr
S	8	Korian Reynaud	Sr
DE	9	Sam Miller	Sr
LB	10	Traveion Webster	Jr
CB	13	Rhoy Williams	Sr
CB	14	Kevric Wiggins	Fr
S	15	Austin Hawley	Jr
DE	16	Ivin White Jr.	Jr
CB	20	Josh Newton	Fr
CB	21	Corey Straughter	Jr
S	23	Nick Ingram	Sr
LB	24	KeyShawn Johnson	Fr
CB	27	Tavier Williams	Fr
S	28	Kevin Jones	Fr
S	29	Logan Latin	Jr
CB	30	Tajhnick Bishop	So
LB	32	Chase Day	Sr
DL	34	Jaylen Veasley	Sr
S	36	Dylan Claiborne	Jr
S	38	DeMarcus Jones	Fr
S	39	Bobby Bell	Fr
CB	41	Semaj Franklin	Jr
LB	42	Hunter Smith	So
DE	44	Ty Shelby	Jr
DE	45	Myles Cole	Fr
LB	46	John Bailey Gullatt	Fr
DL	48	Larance Shaw	Sr
DE	49	Barry Howard Jr.	Jr
LB	52	Tralon Thomas	So
DE	54	Brandon Nettles	Fr
DE	58	Donald Louis Jr.	Sr
DL	59	Deion McNeal	Fr
DL	61	Ethan Swanner	Fr
DL	72	Sam Plants	Fr
DL	78	Colby Rivera	Fr
DL	90	Sir'Darrius Ellis	Fr
DL	91	Kevin Pointer	Fr
DL	93	Mason Husmann	Jr
DL	94	Seth Mason	Fr
DL	96	Dayonte Roberts	Fr
DL	98	John Washington	Sr

Special teams

Pos.	#	Name	Class
K	19	David Hughes	Fr
P	27	Landon Fogleman	Fr
K	31	Jacob Meeks	So
K	47	Craig Walker	So
LS	57	Walker Easton	Sr
LS	59	Bobbie Conklin	Jr
LS	60	Hayden Welte	Fr
K	87	David Heaton	So

Head coach

- Matt Viator (McNeese State)

Coordinators/assistant coaches

- Mike Collins (Northeast Louisiana)
  Defensive coordinator
- Matt Kubik (Louisiana–Monroe)
  Offensive coordinator, quarterbacks
- Tyler Bolfing (Louisiana–Monroe)
  Special teams coordinator, tight ends
- Joey Fitzgerald (Mississippi State)
  Wide receivers, recruiting coordinator
- Eman Naghavi (McNeese State)
  Offensive line
- Joe Graves (Southeastern Louisiana)
  Running backs
- Scott Stoker (Northwestern State)
  Linebackers
- Anthony Camp (McNeese State)
  Defensive line
- Perry Carter (Southern Miss)
  Defensive backs
- Bakari Guice (Grambling State)
  Safeties

Legend

- (C) Team captain
- (S) Suspended
- (I) Ineligible
- Injured
- Redshirt

Roster
Last update: April 30, 2020

== Schedule ==
Louisiana–Monroe announced its 2019 football schedule on March 1, 2019. The 2019 schedule consisted of 6 home and away games in the regular season.

Date	Time	Opponent	Site	TV	Result	Attendance
August 31	6:00 p.m.	Grambling State*	JPS Field at Malone Stadium; Monroe, LA	ESPN3	W 31–9	28,327
September 7	3:00 p.m.	at Florida State*	Doak Campbell Stadium; Tallahassee, FL	ACCN	L 44–45 ^{OT}	52,969
September 21	11:00 a.m.	at Iowa State*	Jack Trice Stadium; Ames, IA	FS1	L 20–72	57,442
September 28	6:00 p.m.	South Alabama	JPS Field at Malone Stadium; Monroe, LA	ESPN+	W 30–17	16,222
October 5	2:45 p.m.	Memphis*	JPS Field at Malone Stadium; Monroe, LA	ESPNU	L 33–52	17,143
October 10	8:15 p.m.	at Texas State	Bobcat Stadium; San Marcos, TX	ESPNU	W 24–14	16,783
October 19	2:30 p.m.	at No. 24 Appalachian State	Kidd Brewer Stadium; Boone, NC	ESPN+	L 7–52	27,717
November 2	2:30 p.m.	Arkansas State^{†}	JPS Field at Malone Stadium; Monroe, LA	ESPNU	L 41–48	15,327
November 9	4:00 p.m.	Georgia State	JPS Field at Malone Stadium; Monroe, LA	ESPN+	W 45–31	13,213
November 16	2:00 p.m.	at Georgia Southern	Paulson Stadium; Statesboro, GA	ESPN+	L 29–51	10,266
November 23	4:00 p.m.	Coastal Carolina	JPS Field at Malone Stadium; Monroe, LA	ESPN3	W 45–42	10,135
November 30	6:30 p.m.	at Louisiana	Cajun Field; Lafayette, LA (Battle on the Bayou)	ESPNU	L 30–31	14,227
*Non-conference game; ^{†}Homecoming; Rankings from AP Poll and CFP Rankings after November 5 released prior to game; All times are in Central time

Schedule source:

== Game summaries ==
=== Grambling State ===
Week One: Grambling State Tigers at Louisiana–Monroe Warhawks – Game summary

Quarter	1	2	3	4	Total
Tigers	6	3	0	0	9
Warhawks	7	10	7	7	31

at Malone Stadium • Monroe, LA

- Date: August 31
- Game time: 7:00 p.m. CDT
- Game weather: 93° · Wind – ENE 9 · Mostly Clear
- Game attendance: 28,327
- Referee: Marshall Lewis
- TV: ESPN3

Game information

First quarter

- (05:42) ULM TD – Josh Johnson 51-yard rush, Jacob Meeks kick
  Louisiana–Monroe 7–0; Drive: 1 play, 46 yards, 0:11
- (00:31) GRAM TD – Lyndon Rash 15-yard pass from Geremy Hickbottom, Garrett Urban PAT failed kick
  Louisiana–Monroe 7–6; Drive: 12 plays, 76 yards, 5:11

Second quarter

- (12:50) ULM TD – Xavier Brown 16-yard pass from Caleb Evans, Jacob Meeks kick
  Louisiana–Monroe 14–6; Drive: 6 plays, 67 yards, 2:41
- (01:16) ULM FG – Jacob Meeks 40-yard field goal
  Louisiana–Monroe 17–6; Drive: 9 plays, 40 yards, 4:14
- (00:07) GRAM FG – Garrett Urban 41-yard field goal
  Louisiana–Monroe 17–9; Drive: 8 plays, 46 yards, 1:09

Third quarter

- (11:59) ULM TD – Austin Vaughn 1-yard rush, Jacob Meeks kick
  Louisiana–Monroe 24–9; Drive: 7 plays, 76 yards, 3:01

Fourth quarter

- (14:52) ULM TD – Josh Johnson 37-yard rush, Jacob Meeks kick
  Louisiana–Monroe 31–9; Drive: 6 plays, 97 yards, 2:08

Leading Passers

- GRAM – Geremy Hickbottom – 18/31, 157 yards, TD
- ULM – Caleb Evans – 19/25, 183 yards, TD, INT

Leading Rushers

- GRAM – Keilon Elder – 6 carries, 82 yards
- ULM – Josh Johnson – 10 carries, 173 yards, 2 TD

Leading Receivers

- GRAM – Devante Davis – 5 receptions, 44 yards
- ULM – Xavier Brown – 6 receptions, 68 yards, TD

Statistics	Grambling State	Louisiana–Monroe
First downs	21	24
Total yards	407	501
Rushing yards	243	315
Passing yards	164	186
Turnovers	1	1
Time of possession	29:36	30:24

=== At Florida State ===
Week Two: Louisiana–Monroe Warhawks at Florida State Seminoles – Game summary

Quarter	1	2	3	4	OT	Total
Warhawks	0	7	14	17	6	44
Seminoles	14	10	0	14	7	45

at Doak Campbell Stadium • Tallahassee, FL

- Date: September 7
- Game time: 4:00 p.m. CDT
- Game weather: 99° · Wind – NW 6 · 0% Chance of Rain
- Game attendance: 52,969
- Referee: Tra Blake
- TV: ACC Network

Game information

First quarter

- (11:51) FSU TD – Cam Akers 9-yard rush, Ricky Aguayo kick
  Florida State 7–0; Drive: 9 plays, 70 yards, 2:21
- (04:06) FSU TD – Tre'Shaun Harrison 19-yard pass from James Blackman, Ricky Aguayo kick
  Florida State 14–0; Drive: 13 plays, 80 yards, 4:42

Second quarter

- (14:26) FSU TD – James Blackman 6-yard rush, Ricky Aguayo kick
  Florida State 21–0; Drive: 7 plays, 40 yards, 2:37
- (03:43) ULM TD – Josh Pederson 33-yard pass from Caleb Evans, Jacob Meeks kick
  Florida State 21–7; Drive: 5 plays, 44 yards, 1:34
- (00:00) FSU FG – Ricky Aguayo 36-yard field goal
  Louisiana–Monroe 24–7; Drive: 9 plays, 31 yards, 3:36

Third quarter

- (08:55) ULM TD – Corey Straughter 57-yard interception returned, Jacob Meeks kick
  Florida State 24–14; Drive: 3 plays, 15 yards, 0:35
- (02:59) ULM TD – Caleb Evans 10-yard rush, Jacob Meeks kick
  Florida State 24–21; Drive: 7 plays, 46 yards, 3:39

Fourth quarter

- (13:22) FSU TD – D. J. Matthews 7-yard pass from James Blackman, Ricky Aguayo kick
  Florida State 31–21; Drive: 12 plays, 78 yards, 4:33
- (09:47) ULM TD – Xavier Brown 2-yard pass from Caleb Evans, Jacob Meeks kick
  Florida State 31–28; Drive: 9 plays, 60 yards, 3:35
- (07:41) ULM TD – Josh Johnson 1-yard rush, Jacob Meeks kick
  Louisiana–Monroe 35–31; Drive: 4 plays, 33 yards, 1:16
- (06:09) FSU TD – Cam Akers 44-yard pass from James Blackman, Ricky Aguayo kick
  Florida State 38–35; Drive: 5 plays, 75 yards, 1:32
- (01:30) ULM FG – Jacob Meeks 24-yard field goal
  Tied 38–38; Drive: 13 plays, 68 yards, 4:39

First overtime

- FSU TD – Cam Akers 4-yard rush, Ricky Aguayo kick
  Florida State 45–38; Drive: 6 plays, 25 yards
- ULM TD – Caleb Evans 5-yard rush, Jacob Meeks PAT failed
  Florida State 45–44; Drive: 3 plays, 25 yards

Leading Passers

- ULM – Caleb Evans – 23/38, 241 yards, 2 TD
- FSU – James Blackman – 30/40, 282 yards, 3 TD, 2 INT

Leading Rushers

- ULM – Josh Johnson – 26 carries, 126 yards, TD
- FSU – Cam Akers – 36 carries, 193 yards, 2 TD

Leading Receivers

- ULM – Josh Pederson – 6 receptions, 85 yards, TD
- FSU – Tamorrion Terry – 6 receptions, 57 yards

Statistics	Louisiana–Monroe	Florida State
First downs	26	30
Total yards	419	501
Rushing yards	178	219
Passing yards	241	282
Turnovers	1	3
Time of possession	30:41	29:19

=== At Iowa State ===
Week Three: Louisiana–Monroe Warhawks at Iowa State Cyclones – Game summary

Quarter	1	2	3	4	Total
Warhawks	0	13	7	0	20
Cyclones	14	13	21	24	72

at Jack Trice Stadium • Ames, IA

- Date: September 21
- Game time: 11:00 a.m. CDT
- Game weather: 75° · Wind – S 5 · overcast
- Game attendance: 57,442
- Referee: Brad Van Vark
- TV: FS1

Game information

First quarter

- (04:59) ISU TD – Brock Purdy 7-yard rush, Connor Assalley kick
  Iowa State 7–0; Drive: 6 plays, 69 yards, 2:52
- (02:03) ISU TD – Brock Purdy 7-yard rush, Connor Assalley kick
  Iowa State 14–0; Drive: 3 plays, 40 yards, 1:09

Second quarter

- (14:49) ISU TD – Tarique Milton 73-yard pass from Brock Purdy, Connor Assalley kick
  Iowa State 21–0; Drive: 2 plays, 75 yards, 0:20
- (10:26) ULM TD – Josh Pederson 19-yard pass from Caleb Evans, Jared Porter kick
  Iowa State 21–7; Drive: 10 plays, 83 yards, 4:17
- (07:46) ISU FG – Connor Assalley 21-yard field goal
  Iowa State 24–7; Drive: 7 plays, 61 yards, 2:34
- (02:50) ULM TD – Josh Johnson 1-yard rush, Jared Porter PAT failed
  Iowa State 24–13; Drive: 12 plays, 87 yards, 4:56
- (00:03) ISU FG – Connor Assalley 37-yard field goal
  Iowa State 27–13; Drive: 11 plays, 55 yards, 2:47

Third quarter

- (12:40) ISU TD – Brock Purdy 13-yard rush, Connor Assalley kick
  Iowa State 34–13; Drive: 6 plays, 75 yards, 2:20
- (08:37) ISU TD – Deshaunte Jones 84-yard pass from Brock Purdy, Connor Assalley kick
  Iowa State 41–13; Drive: 3 plays, 84 yards, 0:57
- (03:56) ULM TD – Jonathan Hodoh 38-yard pass from Caleb Evans, Jared Porter kick
  Iowa State 41–20; Drive: 10 plays, 76 yards, 4:35
- (00:19) ISU TD – Sean Shaw Jr. 12-yard pass from Brock Purdy, Connor Assalley kick
  Iowa State 48–20; Drive: 7 plays, 75 yards, 3:37

Fourth quarter

- (10:42) ISU TD – Sean Shaw Jr. 9-yard pass from Re–al Mitchell, Connor Assalley kick
  Iowa State 55–20; Drive: 6 plays, 54 yards, 2:53
- (07:36) ISU FG – Connor Assalley 24-yard field goal
  Iowa State 58–20; Drive: 6 plays, 30 yards, 2:23
- (07:09) ISU TD – Jake Hummel 48-yard interception returned, Connor Assalley kick
  Iowa State 65–20; Drive: 2 plays, 15 yards, 0:27
- (02:32) ISU TD – Re–al Mitchell 29-yard rush, Connor Assalley kick
  Iowa State 72–20; Drive: 5 plays, 63 yards, 2:27

Leading Passers

- ULM – Caleb Evans – 19/30, 176 yards, 2 TD, INT
- ISU – Brock Purdy – 21/27, 435 yards, 3 TD, INT

Leading Rushers

- ULM – Caleb Evans – 17 carries, 93 yards
- ISU – Brock Purdy – 9 carries, 75 yards, 3 TD

Leading Receivers

- ULM – Jonathan Hodoh – 3 receptions, 46 yards, TD
- ISU – Tarique Milton – 3 receptions, 142 yards, TD

Statistics	Louisiana–Monroe	Iowa State
First downs	22	31
Total yards	425	714
Rushing yards	210	270
Passing yards	215	444
Turnovers	3	2
Time of possession	32:46	27:14

=== South Alabama ===
Week Four: South Alabama Jaguars at Louisiana–Monroe Warhawks – Game summary

Quarter	1	2	3	4	Total
Jaguars	7	0	3	7	17
Warhawks	7	10	0	13	30

at Malone Stadium • Monroe, LA

- Date: September 28
- Game time: 6:00 p.m. CDT
- Game weather: 91° · Wind – S 9 · Sunny
- Game attendance: 16,222
- Referee: Jeremy Parker
- TV announcers (ESPN+): Lyn Rollins (play-by-play), Chris Mycoskie (color analyst) and Wayne Gentry (producer)

Game information

First quarter

- (07:39) USA TD – Cephus Johnson 3-yard rush, Frankie Onate kick
  South Alabama 7–0; Drive: 12 plays, 90 yards, 5:39
- (06:10) ULM TD – Josh Pederson 20-yard pass from Caleb Evans, Jared Porter kick
  Tied 7–7; Drive: 4 plays, 75 yards, 1:29

Second quarter

- (09:34) ULM FG – Jared Porter 22-yard field goal
  Louisiana–Monroe 10–7; Drive: 11 plays, 75 yards, 5:20
- (04:12) ULM TD – Markis McCray 52-yard pass from Caleb Evans, Jared Porter kick
  Louisiana–Monroe 17–7; Drive: 4 plays, 72 yards, 1:45

Third quarter

- (08:27) USA FG – Frankie Onate 21-yard field goal
  Louisiana–Monroe 17–10; Drive: 9 plays, 55 yards, 3:51

Fourth quarter

- (13:00) ULM TD – Jonathan Hodoh 21-yard pass from Caleb Evans, Jared Porter PAT failed
  Louisiana–Monroe 23–10; Drive: 9 plays, 61 yards, 3:06
- (07:02) ULM TD – Caleb Evans 13-yard rush, Jared Porter kick
  Louisiana–Monroe 30–10; Drive: 9 plays, 75 yards, 3:30
- (03:00) USA TD – Cephus Johnson 8-yard rush, Frankie Onate kick
  Louisiana–Monroe 30–17; Drive: 11 plays, 75 yards, 4:02

Leading Passers

- USA – Cephus Johnson – 14/26, 114 yards, INT
- ULM – Caleb Evans – 17/25, 286 yards, 3 TD

Leading Rushers

- USA – Trae Minter – 19 carries, 150 yards
- ULM – Josh Johnson – 15 carries, 93 yards

Leading Receivers

- USA – Jalen Tolbert – 4 receptions, 44 yards
- ULM – Markis McCray – 3 receptions, 70 yards, TD

Statistics	South Alabama Jaguars	Louisiana–Monroe
First downs	24	18
Total yards	377	428
Rushing yards	263	142
Passing yards	114	286
Turnovers	1	0
Time of possession	35:35	24:25

=== Memphis ===
Week Five: Memphis Tigers at Louisiana–Monroe Warhawks – Game summary

Quarter	1	2	3	4	Total
Tigers	7	22	10	13	52
Warhawks	3	14	9	7	33

at Malone Stadium • Monroe, LA

- Date: October 5
- Game time: 2:45 p.m. CDT
- Game weather: 91° · Wind – SW 3 · Partly Clear
- Game attendance: 17,1143
- Referee: Anthony Calabrese
- TV: ESPNU

Game information

First quarter

- (12:18) MEM TD – Damonte Coxie 5-yard pass from Brady White, Riley Patterson kick
  Memphis 7–0; Drive: 6 plays, 75 yards, 1:55
- (05:25) ULM FG – Porter 35-yard field goal
  Memphis 7–3; Drive: 16 plays, 74 yards, 6:52

Second quarter

- (13:46) MEM TD – Kenneth Gainwell 40-yard rush, Riley Patterson kick
  Memphis 14–3; Drive: 6 plays, 92 yards, 1:48
- (11:12) ULM TD – Caleb Evans 7-yard rush, Jared Porter kick
  Memphis 14–10; Drive: 6 plays, 75 yards, 2:34
- (07:30) MEM TD – Kameron Wilson 2-yard pass from Brady White, Jared Porter kick
  Memphis 21–10; Drive: 8 plays, 75 yards, 3:42
- (05:01) MEM TD – Kylan Watkins 14-yard rush, Preston Brady two-point conversion rush
  Memphis 29–10; Drive: 6 plays, 54 yards, 2:29
- (01:40) ULM TD – Josh Pederson 6-yard pass from Caleb Evans, Jared Porter kick
  Memphis 29–17; Drive: 9 plays, 82 yards, 3:21

Third quarter

- (11:57) MEM FG – Riley Patterson 50-yard field goal
  Memphis 31–17; Drive: 8 plays, 43 yards, 3:03
- (07:41) ULM FG – Jared Porter 29-yard field goal
  Memphis 31–20; Drive: 10 plays, 63 yards, 4:16
- (06:11) MEM TD – Antonio Gibson 50-yard pass from Brady White, Riley Patterson kick
  Memphis 39–20; Drive: 4 plays, 73 yards, 1:30
- (03:11) ULM TD – Caleb Evans 45-yard rush, two-point conversion rush attempt failed
  Memphis 39–26; Drive: 6 plays, 82 yards, 3:00

Fourth quarter

- (06:31) ULM TD – Josh Pederson 36-yard pass from Caleb Evans, Jared Porter kick
  Memphis 39–33; Drive: 6 plays, 93 yards, 1:56
- (06:16) MEM TD – Kenneth Gainwell 68-yard rush, two-point conversion pass attempt failed
  Memphis 45–33; Drive: 1 plays, 68 yards, 0:15
- (06:07) MEM TD – La'Andre Thomas 33-yard interception returned, Riley Patterson kick
  Memphis 52–33; Drive: 1 play, 0 yards, 0:09

Leading Passers

- MEM – Brady White – 15/23, 249 yards, 3 TD, INT
- ULM – Caleb Evans – 23/44, 286 yards, 2 TD, INT

Leading Rushers

- MEM – Kenneth Gainwell – 14 carries, 209 yards, 2 TD
- ULM – Josh Johnson – 19 carries, 119 yards

Leading Receivers

- MEM – Antonio Gibson – 1 reception, 50 yards, TD
- ULM – Josh Pederson – 7 receptions, 82 yards, 2 TD

Statistics	Memphis	Louisiana–Monroe
First downs	25	30
Total yards	535	575
Rushing yards	286	256
Passing yards	249	319
Turnovers	2	1
Time of possession	26:06	33:54

=== At Texas State ===
Week Six: Louisiana–Monroe Warhawks at Texas State Bobcats – Game summary

Quarter	1	2	3	4	Total
Warhawks	7	10	0	7	24
Bobcats	0	7	7	0	14

at Bobcat Stadium • San Marcos, TX

- Date: October 10
- Game time: 8:15 p.m. CDT
- Game weather: 89° · Wind – SE 16 · Clear
- Game attendance: 16,783
- Referee: Marshall Lewis
- TV: ESPNU

Game information

First quarter

- (12:13) ULM TD – Josh Johnson 1-yard rush, Jared Porter kick
  Louisiana–Monroe 7–0; Drive: 7 plays, 75 yards, 2:47

Second quarter

- (13:15) ULM TD – Josh Johnson 8-yard rush, Jared Porter kick
  Louisiana–Monroe 14–0; Drive: 11 plays, 80 yards, 4:55
- (09:03) TXST TD – Calvin Hill 3-yard rush, Joshua Rowland kick
  Louisiana–Monroe 14–7; Drive: 12 plays, 75 yards, 4:12
- (05:31) ULM FG – Jared Porter 34-yard field goal
  Louisiana–Monroe 17–7; Drive: 9 plays, 68 yards, 3:27

Third quarter

- (00:54) TXST TD – Trevis Graham Jr. 62-yard pass from Tyler Vitt, Joshua Rowland kick
  Louisiana–Monroe 17–14; Drive: 1 play, 62 yards, 0:11

Fourth quarter

- (01:46) ULM TD – Austin Vaughn 11-yard rush, Jared Porter kick
  Louisiana–Monroe 24–14; Drive: 13 plays, 86 yards, 6:41

Leading Passers

- ULM – Caleb Evans – 18/33, 225 yards, INT
- TXST – Gresch Jensen – 16/30, 170 yards

Leading Rushers

- ULM – Josh Johnson – 22 carries, 114 yards, 2 TD
- TXST – Caleb Twyford – 10 carries, 78 yards

Leading Receivers

- ULM – Malik Jackson – 5 receptions, 55 yards
- TXST – Trevis Graham Jr. – 2 receptions, 69 yards, TD

Statistics	Louisiana–Monroe	Texas State
First downs	24	15
Total yards	429	338
Rushing yards	204	92
Passing yards	225	246
Turnovers	2	2
Time of possession	33:06	26:54

=== At Appalachian State ===
Week Seven: Louisiana–Monroe Warhawks at Appalachian State Mountaineers – Game summary

Quarter	1	2	3	4	Total
Warhawks	7	0	0	0	7
No. 24 Mountaineers	21	10	7	14	52

at Kidd Brewer Stadium • Boone, NC

- Date: October 19
- Game time: 2:30 p.m. CDT
- Game weather: 50 °F (10 °C) · Wind – Light · Rainy
- Game attendance: 27,717
- Referee: Marshall Lewis
- TV: ESPN+

Game information

First quarter

- (11:09) ULM TD – Kayin White 1-yard rush, Jared Porter kick
  Louisiana–Monroe 7–0; Drive: 12 plays, 82 yards, 3:51
- (10:28) APST TD – Darrynton Evans 59-yard rush, Chandler Staton kick
  Tied 7–7; Drive: 3 plays, 75 yards, 0:41
- (04:46) APST TD – Thomas Hennigan 6-yard pass from Zac Thomas, Chandler Staton kick
  Appalachian State 14–7; Drive: 12 plays, 76 yards, 3:57
- (01:19) APST TD – Zac Thomas 1-yard rush, Chandler Staton kick
  Appalachian State 21–7; Drive: 5 plays, 24 yards, 1:51

Second quarter

- (11:14) APST FG – Chandler Staton 27-yard field goal
  Appalachian State 24–7; Drive: 10 plays, 75 yards, 3:46
- (01:19) APST TD – Collin Reed 1-yard pass from Zac Thomas, Chandler Staton kick
  Appalachian State 31–7; Drive: 8 plays, 64 yards, 2:21

Third quarter

- (09:06) APST TD – Darrynton Evans 15-yard pass from Zac Thomas, Chandler Staton kick
  Appalachian State 38–7; Drive: 12 plays, 75 yards, 5:54

Fourth quarter

- (12:21) APST TD – Marcus Williams Jr. 1-yard rush, Chandler Staton kick
  Appalachian State 45–7; Drive: 8 plays, 31 yards, 3:49
- (06:56) APST TD – Jalen Virgil 56-yard pass from Jacob Huesman, Chandler Staton kick
  Appalachian State 52–7; Drive: 2 plays, 58 yards, 0:45

Leading Passers

- ULM – Caleb Evans – 9/19, 75 yards, INT
- APST – Zac Thomas – 18/30, 214 yards, 3 TD, INT

Leading Rushers

- ULM – Josh Johnson – 13 carries, 77 yards
- APST – Darrynton Evans – 17 carries, 136 yards, TD

Leading Receivers

- ULM – Zach Johnson – 2 receptions, 33 yards
- APST – Corey X. Sutton – 5 receptions, 75 yards

Statistics	Louisiana–Monroe	Appalachian State
First downs	9	27
Total yards	213	572
Rushing yards	111	302
Passing yards	102	270
Turnovers	3	2
Time of possession	24:48	35:12

=== Arkansas State ===
Week Eight: Arkansas State Red Wolves at Louisiana–Monroe Warhawks – Game summary

Quarter	1	2	3	4	Total
Red Wolves	3	28	3	14	48
Warhawks	14	14	6	7	41

at Malone Stadium • Monroe, LA

- Date: November 2
- Game time: 4:00 p.m. CDT
- Game weather: 64° · Wind – NW 11 · Clear/Sunny
- Game attendance: 15,327
- Referee: Jason Autrey
- TV: ESPNU

Game information

First quarter

- (13:58) ULM TD – Caleb Evans 67-yard rush, Jared Porter kick
  Louisiana–Monroe 7–0; Drive: 3 plays, 75 yards, 1:02
- (06:56) ULM TD – Josh Johnson 6-yard rush, Jared Porter kick
  Louisiana–Monroe 14–0; Drive: 1 play, 6 yards, 0:06
- (00:41) ARST FG – Blake Grupe 43-yard field goal
  Louisiana–Monroe 14–3; Drive: 8 plays, 54 yards, 2:27

Second quarter

- (14:18) ULM TD – Markis McCray 34-yard pass from Caleb Evans, Jared Porter kick
  Louisiana–Monroe 21–3; Drive: 4 plays, 75 yards, 1:23
- (13:50) ARST TD – Marcel Murray 57-yard rush, Blake Grupe kick
  Louisiana–Monroe 21–10; Drive: 2 plays, 75 yards, 0:28
- (07:28) ARST TD – Omar Bayless 46-yard pass from Layne Hatcher, Blake Grupe kick
  Louisiana–Monroe 21–17; Drive: 7 plays, 78 yards, 2:31
- (07:09) ARST TD – Marcel Murray 35-yard rush, Jared Porter kick
  Arkansas State 24–21; Drive: 1 play, 35 yards, 0:17
- (01:27) ARST TD – Kirk Merritt 23-yard pass from Layne Hatcher, Blake Grupe kick
  Arkansas State 31–21; Drive: 4 plays, 47 yards, 1:15
- (00:03) ULM TD – Caleb Evans 16-yard rush, Jared Porter kick
  Arkansas State 31–28; Drive: 9 plays, 65 yards, 1:24

Third quarter

- (09:29) ARST FG – Blake Grupe 31-yard field goal
  Arkansas State 34–28; Drive: 12 plays, 61 yards, 5:31
- (04:20) ULM TD – Caleb Evans 23-yard rush, Jared Porter PAT failed
  Tied 34–34; Drive: 5 plays, 42 yards, 1:56

Fourth quarter

- (12:58) ARST TD – Marcel Murray 6-yard rush, Blake Grupe kick
  Arkansas State 41–34; Drive: 6 plays, 36 yards, 2:02
- (07:26) ARST TD – Jamal Jones 8-yard rush, Blake Grupe kick
  Arkansas State 48–34; Drive: 7 plays, 73 yards, 3:39
- (02:21) ULM TD – Josh Pederson 11-yard pass from Caleb Evans, Jared Porter kick
  Arkansas State 48–41; Drive: 14 plays, 80 yards, 2:37

Leading Passers

- ARST – Layne Hatcher – 21/28, 307 yards, 2 TD, INT
- ULM – Caleb Evans – 24/37, 215 yards, 2 TD

Leading Rushers

- ARST – Marcel Murray – 24 carries, 175 yards, 3 TD
- ULM – Caleb Evans – 12 carries, 148 yards, 3 TD

Leading Receivers

- ARST – Omar Bayless – 6 receptions, 98 yards, TD
- ULM – Jonathan Hodoh – 6 receptions, 65 yards

Statistics	Arkansas State	Louisiana–Monroe
First downs	21	21
Total yards	514	448
Rushing yards	207	233
Passing yards	307	215
Turnovers	2	1
Time of possession	31:54	28:06

=== Georgia State ===
Week Nine: Georgia State Panthers at Louisiana–Monroe Warhawks – Game summary

Quarter	1	2	3	4	Total
Panthers	10	14	7	0	31
Warhawks	14	10	7	14	45

at Malone Stadium • Monroe, LA

- Date: November 9
- Game time: 4:00 p.m. CDT
- Game weather: Temperature: 63 °F (17 °C) • Wind: Calm • Weather: Clear
- Game attendance: 13,213
- Referee: James Carter
- TV announcers (ESPN+): Doug Anderson (play-by-play) & Chris Mycoskie (analyst)

Game information

First quarter

- (09:26) GSU FG – Brandon Wright 39-yard field goal
  Georgia State 3–0; Drive: 12 plays, 45 yards, 3:38
- (05:59) ULM TD – Caleb Evans 16-yard rush, Jared Porter kick
  Louisiana–Monroe 7–3; Drive: 9 plays, 77 yards, 3:27
- (03:25) GSU TD – Destin Coates 37-yard rush, Brandon Wright kick
  Georgia State 10–7; Drive: 7 plays, 75 yards, 2:34
- (01:47) ULM TD – Josh Pederson 43-yard pass from Caleb Evans, Jared Porter kick
  Louisiana–Monroe 14–10; Drive: 5 plays, 94 yards, 1:38

Second quarter

- (12:54) GSU TD – Dan Ellington 40-yard rush, Brandon Wright kick
  Georgia State 17–14; Drive: 3 plays, 59 yards, 0:45
- (09:28) ULM TD – Josh Johnson 10-yard rush, Jared Porter kick
  Louisiana–Monroe 21–17; Drive: 9 plays, 75 yards, 3:26
- (04:50) GSU TD – Tra Barnett 1-yard rush, Brandon Wright kick
  Georgia State 24–21; Drive: 12 plays, 75 yards, 4:38
- (00:43) ULM TD – Jared Porter 31-yard field goal
  Tied 24–24; Drive: 11 plays, 61 yards, 4:07

Third quarter

- (11:16) ULM TD – Josh Johnson 30-yard rush, Jared Porter kick
  Louisiana–Monroe 31–24; Drive: 3 plays, 82 yards, 0:53
- (08:24) GSU TD – Tra Barnett 7-yard rush, Brandon Wright kick
  Tied 31–31; Drive: 8 plays, 75 yards, 2:52

Fourth quarter

- (07:40) ULM TD – Markis McCray 1-yard pass from Caleb Evans, Jared Porter kick
  Louisiana–Monroe 38–31; Drive: 11 plays, 65 yards, 5:02
- (02:46) ULM TD – Markis McCray 14-yard pass from Caleb Evans, Jared Porter kick
  Louisiana–Monroe 45–31; Drive: 5 plays, 28 yards, 2:30

Leading Passers

- GSU – Cornelious Brown – 8/18, 80 yards
- ULM – Caleb Evans – 24/32, 291 yards, 3 TD, INT

Leading Rushers

- GSU – Tra Barnett – 32 carries, 190 yards, 2 TD
- ULM – Josh Johnson – 20 carries, 168 yards, 2 TD

Leading Receivers

- GSU – Cornelius McCoy – 5 receptions, 38 yards
- ULM – Zach Jackson – 5 receptions, 91 yards

Statistics	Georgia State	Louisiana–Monroe
First downs	27	28
Total yards	536	590
Rushing yards	414	299
Passing yards	122	291
Turnovers	1	1
Time of possession	26:05	33:55

=== At Georgia Southern ===
Week Ten: Louisiana–Monroe Warhawks at Georgia Southern Eagles – Game summary

Quarter	1	2	3	4	Total
Warhawks	7	0	7	15	29
Eagles	7	17	7	20	51

at Paulson Stadium • Statesboro, GA

- Date: November 16
- Game time: 2:00 p.m. CDT
- Game weather: 48° · Wind – N 13 · Overcast, soggy
- Game attendance: 10,266
- Referee: Kyle Olson
- TV: ESPN+

Game information

First quarter

- (11:07) GASO TD – Shai Werts 11-yard rush, Tyler Bass kick
  Georgia Southern 7–0; Drive: 3 plays, 21 yards, 1:14
- (04:56) ULM TD – Austin Vaughn 3-yard rush, Jared Porter kick
  Tied 7–7; Drive: 13 plays, 75 yards, 6:11

Second quarter

- (13:29) GASO FG – Tyler Bass 26-yard field goal
  Georgia Southern 10–7; Drive: 7 plays, 34 yards, 3:00
- (09:00) GASO TD – Shai Werts 24-yard rush, Tyler Bass kick
  Georgia Southern 17–7; Drive: 6 plays, 73 yards, 3:30
- (00:37) GASO TD – Darion Anderson 33-yard pass from Shai Werts, Tyler Bass kick
  Georgia Southern 24–7; Drive: 9 plays, 84 yards, 3:13

Third quarter

- (06:41) ULM TD – Caleb Evans 1-yard rush, Jared Porter kick
  Georgia Southern 24–14; Drive: 8 plays, 84 yards, 3:19
- (00:25) GASO TD – J. D. King 6-yard rush, Tyler Bass kick
  Georgia Southern 31–14; Drive: 2 plays, 6 yards, 0:44

Fourth quarter

- (14:41) GASO TD – Donald Rutledge Jr. 42-yard interception returned, Tyler Bass kick
  Georgia Southern 38–14; Drive: 3 plays, 5 yards, 0:44
- (12:15) ULM TD – Markis McCray 1-yard pass from Caleb Evans, Caleb Evans two-point conversion pass to Josh Pederson
  Georgia Southern 38–22; Drive: 7 plays, 75 yards, 2:26
- (02:48) GASO TD – Wesley Kennedy III 1-yard rush, two-point conversion rush attempt failed
  Georgia Southern 44–22; Drive: 13 plays, 75 yards, 9:27
- (00:20) ULM TD – Josh Pederson 16-yard pass from Caleb Evans, Jared Porter kick
  Georgia Southern 44–29; Drive: 11 plays, 75 yards, 2:28
- (00:13) GASO TD – Monquavion Brinson 42-yard kickoff returned, Tyler Bass kick
  Georgia Southern 51–29; Drive: 0 plays, 0 yards, 0:00

Leading Passers

- ULM – Caleb Evans – 21/36, 285 yards, 2 TD, 2 INT
- GASO – Shai Werts – 5/10, 80 yards, TD

Leading Rushers

- ULM – Josh Johnson – 12 carries, 43 yards
- GASO – J. D. King – 16 carries, 102 yards, TD

Leading Receivers

- ULM – Perry Carter Jr. – 2 receptions, 95 yards
- GASO – Darion Anderson – 1 reception, 33 yards, TD

Statistics	Louisiana–Monroe	Georgia Southern
First downs	18	20
Total yards	370	334
Rushing yards	85	254
Passing yards	285	80
Turnovers	3	0
Time of possession	26:24	33:36

=== Coastal Carolina ===
Week Eleven: Coastal Carolina Chanticleers at Louisiana–Monroe Warhawks – Game summary

Quarter	1	2	3	4	Total
Chanticleers	14	0	14	14	42
Warhawks	14	7	10	14	45

at Malone Stadium • Monroe, LA

- Date: November 23
- Game time: 4:00 p.m. CDT
- Game weather: 54° · Wind – WNW 14 · Clear
- Game attendance: 10,135
- Referee: Wayne Winkler
- TV: ESPN3

Game information

First quarter

- (12:32) CCU TD – CJ Marable 3-yard rush, Massimo Biscardi kick
  Coastal Carolina 7–0; Drive: 5 plays, 75 yards, 2:28
- (11:11) ULM TD – Jake Johnson 12-yard rush, Jared Porter kick
  Tied 7–7; Drive: 5 plays, 67 yards, 1:21
- (05:55) ULM TD – Markis McCray 98-yard pass from Caleb Evans, Jared Porter kick
  Louisiana–Monroe 14–7; Drive: 1 play, 98 yards, 0:12
- (00:57) CCU TD – Jaivon Heiligh 16-yard pass from Fred Payton, Massimo Biscardi kick
  Tied 14–14; Drive: 9 plays, 75 yards, 4:58

Second quarter

- (08:52) ULM TD – Austin Vaughn 10-yard rush, Jared Porter kick
  Louisiana–Monroe 21–14; Drive: 6 plays, 74 yards, 2:03

Third quarter

- (11:19) ULM FG – Jared Porter 37-yard field goal
  Louisiana–Monroe 24–14; Drive: 12 plays, 58 yards, 3:41
- (07:35) CCU TD – Ky'Jon Tyler 29-yard pass from Fred Payton, Massimo Biscardi kick
  Louisiana–Monroe 24–21; Drive: 10 plays, 75 yards, 3:44
- (05:38) CCU TD – Ky'Jon Tyler 72-yard punt returned, Massimo Biscardi kick
  Coastal Carolina 28–24; Drive: 3 plays, -1 yards, 1:57
- (01:52) ULM TD – Caleb Evans 32-yard rush, Jared Porter kick
  Louisiana–Monroe 31–28; Drive: 8 plays, 67 yards, 3:46

Fourth quarter

- (12:17) CCU TD – Reese White 41-yard pass from Fred Payton, Massimo Biscardi kick
  Coastal Carolina 35–31; Drive: 10 plays, 75 yards, 4:35
- (07:44) ULM TD – Josh Johnson 12-yard rush, Jared Porter kick
  Louisiana–Monroe 38–35; Drive: 12 plays, 75 yards, 4:33
- (07:30) CCU TD – CJ Marable 75-yard rush, Massimo Biscardi kick
  Coastal Carolina 42–38; Drive: 1 play, 75 yards, 0:43
- (06:47) ULM TD – Zach Jackson 34-yard pass from Caleb Evans, Jared Porter kick
  Louisiana–Monroe 45–42; Drive: 3 plays, 75 yards, 0:43

Leading Passers

- CCU – Fred Payton – 10/16, 158 yards, 3 TD
- ULM – Caleb Evans – 20/34, 349 yards, 2 TD, INT

Leading Rushers

- CCU – CJ Marable – 18 carries, 172 yards, 2 TD
- ULM – Josh Johnson – 19 carries, 129 yards, 2 TD

Leading Receivers

- CCU – Larry Collins Jr. – 2 receptions, 60 yards
- ULM – Markis McCray – 4 receptions, 117 yards, TD

Statistics	Coastal Carolina	Louisiana–Monroe
First downs	22	27
Total yards	452	563
Rushing yards	230	214
Passing yards	222	349
Turnovers	2	1
Time of possession	33:12	26:48

=== At Louisiana ===
Week Twelve: Louisiana–Monroe Warhawks at Louisiana Ragin' Cajuns – Game summary

Quarter	1	2	3	4	Total
Warhawks	7	7	10	6	30
RV Ragin' Cajuns	7	14	7	3	31

at Cajun Field • Lafayette, LA

- Date: November 30
- Game time: 6:30 p.m. CDT
- Game weather: 75 °F (24 °C) • Weather: Cloudy • Wind: 14 SSW MPH
- Game attendance: 14,227
- Referee: Jeremy Parker
- TV: ESPNU

Game information

First quarter

- (10:02) LA TD – Jamal Bell 36-yard pass from Levi Lewis, Stevie Artigue kick
  Louisiana 7–0; Drive: 4 plays, 40 yards, 1:19
- (03:03) ULM TD – Caleb Evans 19-yard rush, Jared Porter kick
  Tied 7–7; Drive: 7 plays, 62 yards, 3:17

Second quarter

- (10:41) LA TD – Ja'Marcus Bradley 42-yard pass from Levi Lewis, Stevie Artigue kick
  Louisiana 14–7; Drive: 7 plays, 99 yards, 4:03
- (02:24) ULM TD – Josh Pederson 47-yard pass from Caleb Evans, Jared Porter kick
  Tied 14–14; Drive: 4 plays, 80 yards, 1:34
- (00:28) LA TD – Raymond Calais 83-yard rush, Stevie Artigue kick
  Louisiana 21–14; Drive: 1 play, 83 yards, 0:11

Third quarter

- (08:17) ULM TD – Jonathan Hodoh 40-yard pass from Caleb Evans, Jared Porter kick
  Tied 21–21; Drive: 5 plays, 54 yards, 1:38
- (05:34) LA TD – Peter Leblanc 2-yard pass from Levi Lewis, Stevie Artigue kick
  Louisiana 28–21; Drive: 5 plays, 75 yards, 2:43
- (00:05) ULM FG – Jared Porter 23-yard field goal
  Louisiana 28–24; Drive: 12 plays, 80 yards, 5:29

Fourth quarter

- (07:56) ULM TD – Austin Vaughn 11-yard rush, Jared Porter PAT failed
  Louisiana–Monroe 30–28; Drive: 8 plays, 99 yards, 3:21
- (01:21) LA FG – Stevie Artigue 27-yard field goal
  Louisiana 31–30; Drive: 15 plays, 62 yards, 6:35

Leading Passers

- ULM – Caleb Evans – 22/37, 330 yards, 2 TD, INT
- LA – Levi Lewis – 15/23, 270 yards, 3 TD

Leading Rushers

- ULM – Josh Johnson – 13 carries, 109 yards
- LA – Raymond Calais – 8 carries, 107 yards, TD

Leading Receivers

- ULM – Josh Pederson – 6 receptions, 92 yards, TD
- LA – Ja'Marcus Bradley – 4 receptions, 127 yards, TD

Statistics	Louisiana–Monroe	Louisiana
First downs	25	20
Total yards	570	522
Rushing yards	240	252
Passing yards	330	270
Turnovers	1	0
Time of possession	27:46	32:14
