= 2019 Georgia State Panthers football team =

Georgia State University in the 2019 NCAA Division I FBS football season

2019 Georgia State Panthers football

Arizona Bowl, L 17–38 vs. Wyoming
- Conference: Sun Belt Conference
- East Division
- Record: 7–6 (4–4 Sun Belt)
- Head coach: Shawn Elliott (3rd season)
- Offensive coordinator: Brad Glenn (1st season)
- Offensive scheme: Spread
- Defensive coordinator: Nate Fuqua (3rd season)
- Base defense: 4–2–5
- Home stadium: Georgia State Stadium

2019 Sun Belt Conference football standings
	Conf.			Overall
Team	W		L	W		L
East Division
No. 19 Appalachian State x$	7	–	1	13	–	1
Georgia Southern	5	–	3	7	–	6
Georgia State	4	–	4	7	–	6
Troy	3	–	5	5	–	7
Coastal Carolina	2	–	6	5	–	7
West Division
Louisiana x	7	–	1	11	–	3
Arkansas State	5	–	3	8	–	5
Louisiana–Monroe	4	–	4	5	–	7
Texas State	2	–	6	3	–	9
South Alabama	1	–	7	2	–	10
Championship: Appalachian State 45, Louisiana 38
$ – Conference champion; x – Division champion/co-champions; Rankings from AP Poll

The 2019 Georgia State Panthers football team represented Georgia State University (GSU) in the 2019 NCAA Division I FBS football season. The Panthers were led by third-year head coach Shawn Elliott. This was the Panthers' seventh season in the Sun Belt Conference, second within the East Division, and 10th since starting football. They played their home games at Georgia State Stadium.

== Recruiting ==
College recruiting information
Name	Hometown	School	Height	Weight	40^{‡}	Commit date
Tahji Gilbert; DT	Senatobia, MS	Northwest Mississippi Community College	6 ft 0 in (1.83 m)	282 lb (128 kg)	–	Dec 10, 2018
Tahji Gilbert; DT	Recruit ratings: Scout: Rivals: 247Sports:					
Javon Denis; DT	Deerfield Beach, FL	Deerfield Beach	6 ft 0 in (1.83 m)	243 lb (110 kg)	–	Nov 7, 2018
Javon Denis; DT	Recruit ratings: Scout: 247Sports:					
Miles Dickens; DE	Deerfield Beach, FL	Deerfield Beach	6 ft 2 in (1.88 m)	249 lb (113 kg)	–	Feb 6, 2019
Miles Dickens; DE	Recruit ratings: Scout: Rivals: 247Sports: ESPN: (73)					
Cornelious Brown; QB	Calera, AL	Calera	6 ft 5 in (1.96 m)	182 lb (83 kg)	–	Dec 19, 2018
Cornelious Brown; QB	Recruit ratings: Scout: Rivals: 247Sports:					
Jamari Thrash; WR	Lagrange, GA	Troup County	6 ft 0 in (1.83 m)	180 lb (82 kg)	–	Jan 20, 2019
Jamari Thrash; WR	Recruit ratings: Scout: Rivals: 247Sports:					
Luis Cristobal; G	Miami, FL	Columbus	6 ft 2 in (1.88 m)	295 lb (134 kg)	–	Dec 19, 2018
Luis Cristobal; G	Recruit ratings: Scout: Rivals: 247Sports:					
Antavious Lane; S	Palm Beach Gardens, FL	Dwyer	5 ft 9 in (1.75 m)	180 lb (82 kg)	–	Feb 6, 2019
Antavious Lane; S	Recruit ratings: Scout: Rivals: 247Sports: ESPN: (76)					
Trey Bonner; OT	Gray, GA	Jones County	6 ft 4 in (1.93 m)	285 lb (129 kg)	–	Dec 19, 2018
Trey Bonner; OT	Recruit ratings: Scout: Rivals: 247Sports:					
Ronald Folkes; DT	Palm Beach Gardens, FL	Dwyer	6 ft 4 in (1.93 m)	285 lb (129 kg)	–	Dec 19, 2018
Ronald Folkes; DT	Recruit ratings: Scout: Rivals: 247Sports:					
Jordan Veneziale; LB	Dallas, GA	North Paulding	6 ft 1 in (1.85 m)	220 lb (100 kg)	–	Dec 19, 2018
Jordan Veneziale; LB	Recruit ratings: Scout: Rivals: 247Sports:					
Avery Reece; C	Honea Path, SC	Belton Honea Path	6 ft 3 in (1.91 m)	273 lb (124 kg)	–	Dec 3, 2018
Avery Reece; C	Recruit ratings: Scout: Rivals: 247Sports:					
Jaquez Pennimon; CB	Macon, GA	Southwest	6 ft 1 in (1.85 m)	180 lb (82 kg)	–	Sep 20, 2018
Jaquez Pennimon; CB	Recruit ratings: Scout: 247Sports:					
Tyreke Harrison; CB	Plant City, FL	Plant City	5 ft 11 in (1.80 m)	170 lb (77 kg)	–	Dec 19, 2018
Tyreke Harrison; CB	Recruit ratings: Scout: Rivals: 247Sports:					
Thomas Gore; DE	Brentwood, TN	Brentwood Academy	6 ft 2 in (1.88 m)	280 lb (130 kg)	–	Dec 19, 2018
Thomas Gore; DE	Recruit ratings: Scout: Rivals: 247Sports:					
Jeffrey Clark; DT	Powder Springs, GA	McEachern	6 ft 1 in (1.85 m)	275 lb (125 kg)	–	Dec 19, 2018
Jeffrey Clark; DT	Recruit ratings: Scout: Rivals: 247Sports:					
Cameron Sims; CB	Memphis, TN	Lausanne Collegiate School	6 ft 1 in (1.85 m)	180 lb (82 kg)	–	Jan 20, 2019
Cameron Sims; CB	Recruit ratings: Scout: 247Sports:					
Marcus Anderson; LB	Moultrie, GA	Colquitt County	5 ft 11 in (1.80 m)	220 lb (100 kg)	–	Jul 26, 2018
Marcus Anderson; LB	Recruit ratings: Scout: 247Sports:					
Cadarrius Thompson; WR	Florence, AL	Florence	6 ft 3 in (1.91 m)	180 lb (82 kg)	–	Feb 6, 2019
Cadarrius Thompson; WR	Recruit ratings: Scout: Rivals: 247Sports:					
Jay Lepkoske; DE	Cleveland, GA	White County	6 ft 2 in (1.88 m)	210 lb (95 kg)	–	Jun 13, 2018
Jay Lepkoske; DE	Recruit ratings: Scout: 247Sports:					
Jay Lepkoske; DE	Cleveland, GA	White County	6 ft 2 in (1.88 m)	210 lb (95 kg)	–	Jun 13, 2018
Jay Lepkoske; DE	Recruit ratings: Scout: 247Sports:					
Michael Hayes; K	Florence, SC	West Florence	5 ft 10 in (1.78 m)	185 lb (84 kg)	–	Jan 25, 2019
Michael Hayes; K	Recruit ratings: Scout: 247Sports:					
Bryquice Brown; S	Lithia Springs, GA	Lithia Springs Comprehensive	6 ft 0 in (1.83 m)	180 lb (82 kg)	–	Feb 6, 2019
Bryquice Brown; S	Recruit ratings: Scout: 247Sports:					
Kyle Wright; LB	Blythewood, SC	Ben Lippen	6 ft 1 in (1.85 m)	235 lb (107 kg)	–	May 12, 2019
Kyle Wright; LB	Recruit ratings: Scout: Rivals: 247Sports: ESPN: (75)					
Michael Hayes; K	Florence, SC	Memphis	5 ft 10 in (1.78 m)	185 lb (84 kg)	–	May 10, 2019
Michael Hayes; K	Recruit ratings: Scout: Rivals: 247Sports:					
Overall recruit ranking: 247Sports: 105
Note: In many cases, Scout, Rivals, 247Sports, On3, and ESPN may conflict in their listings of height and weight.; In these cases, the average was taken. ESPN grades are on a 100-point scale.; Sources: "2019 Team Ranking". Rivals.com.

== Preseason ==
=== Sun Belt coaches poll ===
The preseason poll was released prior to the Sun Belt media day on July 21, 2019. The Panthers were predicted to finish in fifth place in the Sun Belt East Division.

=== Preseason All-Sun Belt Teams ===
The Panthers had two players selected to the preseason all-Sun Belt teams.

Offense

2nd Team

Hunter Atkinson – OL

Special teams

1st Team

Brandon Wright – P

== Personnel ==
=== Roster ===
2019 Georgia State Panthers football team roster
Players
Coaches
Offense

Pos.	#	Name	Class
RB	5	Tra Barnett	Sr
WR	6	Jonathan Ifedi	Jr
QB	13	Dan Ellington	Sr
WR	14	Devin Gentry	Sr
WR	15	Sam Pickney	Fr
RB	17	Destin Coates	So
RB	23	Darius Stubbs	Jr
RB	25	Dawson Hill	Fr
RB	26	Tucker Gregg	So
WR	27	Terrance Dixon	So
RB	28	Seth Paige	So
TE	35	Herman McCray	Fr
RB	43	Deandre Bowman	Jr
TE	45	Roger Carter	Jr
C	62	Malik Sumter	So
G	64	Pat Bartlett	So
OT	70	Chris Sibilia	So
OL	71	Jaelin Whitt	Fr
OL	73	Travis Glover	Fr
OL	74	Despelado Alexandre	Fr
G	75	Shamarious Gilmore	Sr
OT	76	Hunter Atkinson	Sr
OT	77	Johnathan Bass	Fr
OT	79	Connor Robbins	So
WR	80	Matlin Marshall	Jr
WR	83	Cornelius McCoy	So
TE	84	Camrin Knight	Sr
WR	85	Christian Owens	Sr
TE	86	Bryson Duckworth	Jr
TE	88	Aubry Payne	Jr

Defense

Pos.	#	Name	Class
LB	1	Jontrey Hunter	So
LB	2	Ed Curney	Sr
S	3	Chris Bacon	So
CB	4	Khai Anderson	Sr
LB	6	Trajan Stephens-McQueen	Jr
LB	7	Jordan Strachan	So
CB	9	Cedric Stone	Jr
S	10	Jacorey Crawford	So
CB	11	Evan Jones	Jr
CB	12	Tyler Gore	So
CB	19	Kerryon Richardson	So
CB	20	Quavian White	So
S	21	Remy Lazarus	Sr
S	22	Trey Chapman	Jr
S	23	Nygee Williams-Mitchell	Jr
LB	25	Kyndall Phillips	Sr
LB	26	Kendrec Grady	Jr
S	27	Jaylon Jones	So
CB	28	Ben Hood	Sr
S	29	Courtney Williams	Fr
DE	30	Javonte Lain	Jr
DB	31	Jabari Aiken	So
LB	32	Zach Dixon	Fr
LB	33	T.J. Smith	Fr
CB	36	Tiyance Dewberry	Fr
LB	37	Victor Heywardl	Jr
DB	39	Romario Johnson	Sr
CB	41	Jordan Cornelius	Jr
LB	42	Blake Carroll	So
LB	46	Darius Snellings	Jr
LB	47	Jhi'Shawn Taylor	So
DE	50	T.J. Arnold	Jr
NG	52	Dontae Wilson	Jr
LB	53	Jalen Wade	Sr
DE	54	Tre Moore	Fr
DE	55	Terry Thomas	Sr
DL	56	Steven Banks	So
DL	58	Edward Verdree	So
DE	90	Hardrick Willis	Jr
DL	92	Mario Dungy	Jr
DL	95	Tahji Gilbert	Jr
DL	96	Dorrius Rodgers	Jr
NG	97	Akeem Smith	Fr
DL	98	Javon Denis	Fr
CB	99	Clifford Amazan	Sr

Special teams

Pos.	#	Name	Class
P	48	Oliver Holdenson	Sr
LS	51	Charlie Flint	Fr
K	90	Mateo Rengifo	Fr
PK	93	Brandon Wright	Sr
PK	94	Barry Brown	Jr

Head coach

- Shawn Elliot (Appalachian State)

Coordinators/assistant coaches

- Nate Fuqua (Wofford)
  Defensive coordinator/outside linebackers
- Brad Glenn (Clemson)
  Offensive coordinator/quarterbacks
- Thomas Austin (Clemson)
  Assistant coach/offensive line
- Chris Collins (Western Carolina)
  Assistant coach/safeties/recruiting coordinator
- Trent McKnight (Samford)
  Assistant coach/wide receivers
- Aairon Savage (Auburn)
  Assistant coach/cornerbacks
- Jimmy Smith (Tennessee State)
  Assistant coach/running backs
- Josh Stepp (Furman)
  Assistant coach/tight ends
- Shiel Wood (Wofford)
  Assistant coach/special teams

Legend

- (C) Team captain
- (S) Suspended
- (I) Ineligible
- Injured
- Redshirt

Roster
Last update: June 10, 2016

=== Coaching and support staff ===
Name	Position	Consecutive season at Georgia State in current position
Shawn Elliott	Head Coach	3rd
Offensive staff
Brad Glenn	Offensive coordinator, Quarterbacks	1st
Thomas Austin	Assistant coach, offensive line	1st
Trent McKnight	Assistant coach, wide receivers	3rd
Jimmy Smith	Assistant coach, Running backs	1st
Josh Stepp	Assistant coach, Tight ends	3rd
Defensive staff
Nate Fuqua	Defensive coordinator, outside linebackers	3rd
Chris Collins	Assistant coach, Safeties	3rd
Brad Lawing	Assistant coach, defensive line	1st
Aairon Savage	Assistant coach, Cornerbacks	1st
Shiel Wood	Assistant coach, Inside linebackers, Special Teams	1st
Support staff
Antreal Allen	Quality control coach	2nd
Matt Axelrod	Video Coordinator	7th
Taylor Isbell	Operations Assistant	1st
Michael Lambros	Coaching Graduate Assistant	2nd
Bob Murphy	Associate AD, Sports Medicine and Nutrition	9th
Nate Simon	Equipment Manager	1st
John Sisk	Head Strength and Conditioning Coach	1st
Ginny Thompson	Director of On-Campus Recruiting/Player Personnel	3rd
Daryl Vining	Coaching Graduate Assistant	2nd
Steve Wojcikowski	Director of Football Operations	4th

== Schedule ==
Georgia State announced its 2019 football schedule on March 1, 2019. The 2019 schedule consisted of six home and six away games for the regular season. The Panthers hosted Sun Belt foes Arkansas State, Troy, Appalachian State, and South Alabama, and traveled to Texas State, Coastal Carolina, ULM, and in-state rivals Georgia Southern. Georgia State would not play Sun Belt foe Louisiana this year. The team would play four non-conference games, including home games against Furman, an FCS team from the Southern Conference, and Army, an FBS Independent, as well as away games at Tennessee of the Southeastern Conference (SEC) and Western Michigan of the Mid-American Conference (MAC)

Date	Time	Opponent	Site	TV	Result	Attendance
August 31	3:30 p.m.	at Tennessee*	Neyland Stadium; Knoxville, TN	ESPNU	W 38–30	85,503
September 7	7:00 p.m.	No. 17 (FCS) Furman*	Georgia State Stadium; Atlanta, GA	ESPN3	W 48–42	20,351
September 14	7:00 p.m.	at Western Michigan*	Waldo Stadium; Kalamazoo, MI	ESPN+	L 10–57	22,328
September 21	7:00 p.m.	at Texas State	Bobcat Stadium; San Marcos, TX	ESPN+	L 34–37 ^{3OT}	15,803
October 5	3:30 p.m.	Arkansas State^{†}	Georgia State Stadium; Atlanta, GA	ESPN+	W 52–38	16,109
October 12	5:00 p.m.	at Coastal Carolina	Brooks Stadium; Conway, SC	ESPN+	W 31–21	17,249
October 19	7:00 p.m.	Army*	Georgia State Stadium; Atlanta, GA	ESPN+	W 28–21	21,720
October 26	7:00 p.m.	Troy	Georgia State Stadium; Atlanta, GA	ESPN+	W 52–33	14,527
November 9	5:00 p.m.	at Louisiana–Monroe	Malone Stadium; Monroe, LA	ESPN+	L 31–45	13,213
November 16	7:30 p.m.	No. 25 Appalachian State	Georgia State Stadium; Atlanta, GA	ESPNU	L 27–56	17,908
November 23	2:00 p.m.	South Alabama	Georgia State Stadium; Atlanta, GA	ESPN+	W 28–15	12,501
November 30	6:00 p.m.	at Georgia Southern	Paulson Stadium; Statesboro, GA (rivalry)	ESPN+	L 10–38	15,175
December 31	4:30 p.m.	vs. Wyoming*	Arizona Stadium; Tucson, AZ (Arizona Bowl)	CBSSN	L 17–38	36,892
*Non-conference game; ^{†}Homecoming; Rankings from AP Poll and College Football Playoff Rankings after November 5 released prior to game; All times are in Eastern time

Schedule source:

== Game summaries ==
=== At Tennessee ===
Georgia State Panthers at Tennessee Volunteers

Quarter	1	2	3	4	Total
Panthers	7	7	7	17	38
Volunteers	14	3	3	10	30

at Neyland Stadium, Knoxville, TN

- Date: August 31, 2019
- Game time: 3:30 p.m. EDT
- Game weather: Temperature: 89 °F (32 °C) • Wind: NE 5 mph • Weather: Sunny
- Game attendance: 85,503
- Referee: Marc Curles
- TV announcers (ESPNU): Clay Matvick (play-by-play), Ryan Leaf (color) & Stormy Buonantony (sideline)
- ESPN – Tennessee stunned as Georgia St. rallies for win /// Box Score, Georgia State at Tennessee /// Pregame Notes /// Postgame Notes

Game information

First Quarter

- (12:00) GSU TD – Seth Paige 4-yard rush, Brandon Wright kick
  Drive: 6 plays, 23 yards, 2:45; Georgia State 7–0
- (04:13) TENN TD – Marquez Callaway 6-yard pass from Jarrett Guarantano, Brent Cimaglia kick
  Drive: 16 plays, 78 yards, 7:42; Tied 7–7
- (00:09) TENN TD – Ty Chandler 31-yard rush, Brent Cimaglia kick
  Drive: 5 plays, 46 yards, 1:58; Tennessee 14–7

Second Quarter

- (03:11) GSU TD – Cornelius McCoy 17-yard pass from Dan Ellington, Brandon Wright kick
  Drive: 16 plays, 81 yards, 6:32; Tied 14–14
- (00:00) TENN FG – Brent Cimaglia 19-yard field goal
  Drive: 12 plays, 73 yards, 3:11; Tennessee 17–14

Third Quarter

- (10:30) GSU TD – Aubry Payne 6-yard pass from Dan Ellington, Brandon Wright kick
  Drive: 9 plays, 75 yards, 4:30; Georgia State 21–17
- (03:32) TENN FG – Brent Cimaglia 48-yard field goal
  Drive: 7 plays, 19 yards, 3:01; Georgia State 21–20

Fourth Quarter

- (12:05) TENN FG – Brent Cimaglia 31-yard field goal
  Drive: 5 plays, 62 yards, 2:16; Tennessee 23–21
- (08:56) GSU TD – Tra Barnett 19-yard rush, Brandon Wright kick
  Drive: 9 plays, 75 yards, 3:09; Georgia State 28–23
- (04:45) GSU TD – Dan Ellington 22-yard rush, Brandon Wright kick
  Drive: 5 plays, 39 yards, 2:25; Georgia State 35–23
- (02:37) GSU FG – Brandon Wright 48-yard field goal
  Drive: 4 plays, 5 yards, 1:37; Georgia State 38–23
- (00:02) TENN TD – Jauan Jennings 18-yard pass from Jarrett Guarantano, Brent Cimaglia kick
  Drive: 5 plays, 69 yards, 0:53; Georgia State 38–30

Passing

- GSU – Dan Ellington: 11/24, 139 yards, 2 TD
- TENN – Jarrett Guarantano: 26/40, 311 yards, 2 TD, 1 INT

Rushing

- GSU – Tra Barnett: 21 carries, 95 yards, 1 TD
- TENN – Ty Chandler: 6 carries, 48 yards, 1 TD

Receiving

- GSU – Cornelius McCoy: 3 receptions, 43 yards, 1 TD
- TENN – Jauan Jennings: 7 receptions, 108 yards, 1 TD

=== Furman ===
No. 17 (FCS) Furman Paladins at Georgia State Panthers

Quarter	1	2	3	4	Total
No. 17 (FCS) Paladins	13	7	8	14	42
Panthers	3	14	21	10	48

at Georgia State Stadium, Atlanta, GA

- Date: September 7, 2019
- Game time: 7:00 p.m. EDT
- Game weather: Temperature: 90 °F (32 °C) • Wind: Calm • Weather: Mostly Sunny
- Game attendance: 20,351
- Referee: Kyle Olson
- TV announcers (ESPN3): Bob Rathbun (play-by-play) & Wayne Gandy (analyst)
- ESPN – Ellington's 5 TD passes rally Georgia State past Furman /// Box Score, Furman at Georgia State /// Pregame Notes /// Postgame Notes

Game information

First Quarter

- (12:37) FUR TD – Ryan Miller 18-yard pass from Darren Grainger, Grayson Atkins kick blocked
  Drive: 6 plays, 75 yards, 2:23; Furman 6–0
- (09:05) GSU FG – Brandon Wright 29-yard field goal
  Drive: 10 plays, 63 yards, 3:32; Furman 6–3
- (03:34) FUR TD – Thomas Gordon 32-yard pass from Darren Grainger, Grayson Atkins kick
  Drive: 11 plays, 83 yards, 5:31; Furman 13–3

Second Quarter

- (12:55) FUR TD – Devin Wynn 3-yard rush, Grayson Atkins kick
  Drive: 8 plays, 82 yards, 4:21; Furman 20–3
- (02:47) GSU TD – Tra Barnett 18-yard rush, Brandon Wright kick
  Drive: 16 plays, 94 yards, 5:32; Furman 20–10
- (00:00) GSU TD – Terrance Dixon 10-yard pass from Dan Ellington, Brandon Wright kick
  Drive: 8 plays, 66 yards, 1:27; Furman 20–17

Third Quarter

- (12:03) GSU TD – Sam Pinckney 26-yard pass from Dan Ellington, Brandon Wright kick
  Drive: 8 plays, 85 yards, 2:57; Georgia State 24–20
- (07:12) GSU TD – Roger Carter 2-yard pass from Dan Ellington, Brandon Wright kick
  Drive: 7 plays, 66 yards, 3:03; Georgia State 31–20
- (02:44) FUR TD – Ryan DeLuca 11-yard pass from Darren Grainger, Ryan Miller pass from Darren Grainger
  Drive: 8 plays, 75 yards, 4:28; Georgia State 31–28
- (00:38) GSU TD – Aubry Payne 20-yard pass from Dan Ellington, Brandon Wright kick
  Drive: 8 plays, 75 yards, 2:06; Georgia State 38–28

Fourth Quarter

- (13:41) FUR TD – Devin Abrams 30-yard pass from Darren Grainger, Grayson Atkins kick
  Drive: 5 plays, 75 yards, 1:57; Georgia State 38–35
- (12:10) GSU TD – Cornelius McCoy 44-yard pass from Dan Ellington, Brandon Wright kick
  Drive: 5 plays, 75 yards, 1:31; Georgia State 45–35
- (07:35) GSU FG – Brandon Wright 38-yard field goal
  Drive: 4 plays, -6 yards, 2:15; Georgia State 48–35
- (03:26) FUR TD – Darren Grainger 12-yard rush, Grayson Atkins kick
  Drive: 8 plays, 75 yards, 4:09; Georgia State 48–42

Passing

- FUR – Darren Grainger: 16/25, 311 yards, 4 TD
- GSU – Dan Ellington: 29/37, 362 yards, 5 TD

Rushing

- FUR – Devin Wynn: 13 carries, 83 yards, 1 TD
- GSU – Dan Ellington: 15 carries, 86 yards

Receiving

- FUR – Thomas Gordon: 8 receptions, 163 yards, 1 TD
- GSU – Cornelius McCoy: 10 receptions, 143 yards, 1 TD

=== At Western Michigan ===
Georgia State Panthers at Western Michigan Broncos

Quarter	1	2	3	4	Total
Panthers	10	0	0	0	10
Broncos	24	19	14	0	57

at Waldo Stadium, Kalamazoo, MI

- Date: September 14, 2019
- Game time: 7:00 p.m. EDT
- Game weather: Temperature: 73 °F (23 °C) • Wind: S 10-15 mph • Weather: Clear
- Game attendance: 22,328
- Referee: Jeremy Valentine
- TV announcers (ESPN+): Dan Gutowsky (play-by-play) & Je'Rod Cherry (analyst)
- ESPN – Western Michigan runs for record 7 TDs in win over Ga. State /// Box Score, Georgia State at Western Michigan /// Pregame Notes /// Postgame Notes

Game information

First Quarter

- (14:18) WMU TD – LeVante Bellamy 60-yard rush, Thiago Kapps kick
  Drive: 2 plays, 75 yards, 0:42; Western Michigan 7–0
- (12:32) GSU FG – Brandon Wright 32-yard field goal
  Drive: 6 plays, 60 yards, 1:46; Western Michigan 7–3
- (09:55) WMU FG – Thiago Kapps 26-yard field goal
  Drive: 7 plays, 44 yards, 2:37; Western Michigan 10–3
- (03:32) WMU TD – Sean Tyler 61-yard rush, Thiago Kapps kick
  Drive: 4 plays, 80 yards, 1:48; Western Michigan 17–3
- (01:43) GSU TD – Aubry Payne 20-yard pass from Dan Ellington, Brandon Wright kick
  Drive: 4 plays, 75 yards, 1:49; Western Michigan 17–10
- (00:38) WMU TD – Levante Bellamy 36-yard rush, Thiago Kapps kick
  Drive: 4 plays, 75 yards, 1:05; Western Michigan 24–10

Second Quarter

- (12:22) WMU TD – Levante Bellamy 73-yard rush, Thiago Kapps kick failed
  Drive: 3 plays, 80 yards, 1:17; Western Michigan 30–10
- (06:12) WMU TD – Sean Tyler 30-yard rush, Levante Bellamy rush failed
  Drive: 4 plays, 80 yards, 1:38; Western Michigan 36–10
- (00:21) WMU TD – Jon Wassink 16-yard rush, Thiago Kapps kick
  Drive: 4 plays, 26 yards, 0:23; Western Michigan 43–10

Third Quarter

- (07:54) WMU TD – Dashon Bussell 41-yard pass from Jon Wassink, Thiago Kapps kick
  Drive: 11 plays, 96 yards, 5:04; Western Michigan 50–10
- (03:26) WMU TD – Davon Tucker 19-yard rush, Thiago Kapps kick
  Drive: 4 plays, 39 yards, 2:05; Western Michigan 57–10

Fourth Quarter
No scoring

Passing

- GSU – Dan Ellington: 11/20, 126 yards, 1 TD, 1 INT
- WMU – Jon Wassink: 15/20, 246 yards, 1 TD

Rushing

- GSU – Tra Barnett: 19 carries, 127 yards
- WMU – LeVante Bellamy: 15 carries, 192 yards, 3 TD

Receiving

- GSU – Devin Gentry: 1 reception, 44 yards
- WMU – Skyy Moore: 6 receptions, 97 yards

=== At Texas State ===
Georgia State Panthers at Texas State Bobcats

Quarter	1	2	3	4	OT	2OT	3OT	Total
Panthers	7	10	0	10	7	0	0	34
Bobcats	10	7	3	7	7	0	3	37

at Bobcat Stadium, San Marcos, TX

- Date: September 21, 2019
- Game time: 6:00 p.m. CDT
- Game weather: Temperature: 91 °F (33 °C) • Wind: SE 17 mph • Weather: Partly Cloudy
- Game attendance: 15,803
- Referee: Jeremy Parker
- TV announcers (ESPN+): Brant Freeman (play-by-play), Joplo Bartu (analyst) & Brooke Shoemaker (sideline)
- ESPN – Rowland's kick lifts Texas State to 37–34 triple OT win /// Box Score, Georgia State at Texas State /// Pregame Notes /// Postgame Notes

Game information

First Quarter

- (13:14) TXST FG – Joshua Rowland 45-yard field goal
  Drive: 4 plays, -2 yards, 1:01; Texas State 3–0
- (08:30) GSU TD – Cornelius McCoy 17-yard pass from Dan Ellington, Brandon Wright kick
  Drive: 10 plays, 75 yards, 4:44; Georgia State 7–3
- (02:55) TXST TD – Javen Banks 0-yard fumble recovery, Joshua Rowland kick
  Drive: 0 plays, 0 yards, 0:00; Texas State 10–7

Second Quarter

- (09:09) GSU TD – Aubry Payne 5-yard pass from Dan Ellington, Brandon Wright kick
  Drive: 9 plays, 73 yards, 3:33; Georgia State 14–10
- (03:43) TXST TD – Anthony D. Taylor 2-yard rush, Joshua Rowland kick
  Drive: 15 plays, 75 yards, 5:26; Texas State 17–14
- (00:00) GSU FG – Brandon Wright 37-yard field goal
  Drive: 13 plays, 50 yards, 3:43; Tied 17–17

Third Quarter

- (05:11) TXST FG – Joshua Rowland 34-yard field goal
  Drive: 7 plays, 33 yards, 2:40; Texas State 20–17

Fourth Quarter

- (08:05) GSU TD – Destin Coates 7-yard rush, Brandon Wright kick
  Drive: 13 plays, 56 yards, 6:48; Georgia State 24–20
- (04:56) TXST TD – Anthony D. Taylor 20-yard rush, Joshua Rowland kick
  Drive: 7 plays, 75 yards, 3:09; Texas State 27–24
- (00:00) GSU FG – Brandon Wright 20-yard field goal
  Drive: 14 plays, 76 yards, 4:49; Tied 27–27

First Overtime

- GSU td – Sam Pinckney 13-yard pass from Dan Ellington, Brandon Wright kick
  Drive: 4 plays, 25 yards, 0:00; Georgia State 34–27
- TXST td – Gresch Jensen 1-yard rush, Joshua Rowland kick
  Drive: 5 plays, 25 yards, 0:00; Tied 34–34

Second Overtime
No scoring
Third Overtime

- TXST fg – Joshua Rowland 35-yard field goal
  Drive: 4 plays, 7 yards, 0:00; Texas State 37–34

Passing

- GSU – Dan Ellington: 24/39, 219 yards, 3 TD, 1 INT
- TXST – Gresch Jensen: 16/25, 129 yards

Rushing

- GSU – Destin Coates: 21 carries, 95 yards, 1 TD
- TXST – Caleb Twyford: 27 carries, 137 yards

Receiving

- GSU – Sam Pinckney: 7 receptions, 95 yards, 1 TD
- TXST – Jah'Marae Sheread: 3 receptions, 38 yards

=== Arkansas State ===
Arkansas State Red Wolves at Georgia State Panthers

Quarter	1	2	3	4	Total
Red Wolves	0	21	7	10	38
Panthers	7	24	7	14	52

at Georgia State Stadium, Atlanta, GA

- Date: October 5, 2019
- Game time: 3:30 p.m. EDT
- Game weather: Temperature: 77 °F (25 °C) • Wind: E 14 mph • Weather: Cloudy
- Game attendance: 16,109
- Referee: Jeremy Parker
- TV announcers (ESPN+): Matt Stewart (play-by-play), Wayne Gandy (analyst) & Jael Rucker (sideline)
- ESPN – Coates leads strong run game, Georgia State rolls 52–38 /// Box Score, Arkansas State at Georgia State /// Pregame Notes /// Postgame Notes

Game information

First Quarter

- (09:41) GSU TD – Tra Barnett 3-yard rush, Brandon Wright kick
  Drive: 12 plays, 75 yards, 5:19; Georgia State 7–0

Second Quarter

- (14:55) GSU TD – Destin Coates 27-yard rush, Brandon Wright kick
  Drive: 8 plays, 89 yards, 2:47; Georgia State 14–0
- (08:56) GSU TD – Seth Paige 7-yard rush, Brandon Wright kick
  Drive: 8 plays, 80 yards, 3:33; Georgia State 21–0
- (08:00) ASU TD – Kirk Merritt 24-yard pass from Layne Hatcher, Blake Grupe kick
  Drive: 3 plays, 75 yards, 0:56; Georgia State 21–7
- (05:44) GSU FG – Brandon Wright 43-yard field goal
  Drive: 8 plays, 49 yards, 2:16; Georgia State 24–7
- (04:40) ASU TD – Marcel Murray 28-yard rush, Blake Grupe kick
  Drive: 3 plays, 75 yards, 1:04; Georgia State 24–14
- (01:38) GSU TD – Sam Pinckney 11-yard pass from Dan Ellington, Brandon Wright kick
  Drive: 9 plays, 75 yards, 3:02; Georgia State 31–14
- (00:47) ASU TD – Omar Bayless 31-yard pass from Layne Hatcher, Blake Grupe kick
  Drive: 5 plays, 59 yards, 0:51; Georgia State 31–21

Third Quarter

- (10:26) GSU TD – Dan Ellington 10-yard rush, Brandon Wright kick
  Drive: 6 plays, 90 yards, 2:21; Georgia State 38–21
- (04:21) ASU TD – Omar Bayless 4-yard pass from Layne Hatcher, Blake Grupe kick
  Drive: 4 plays, 80 yards, 1:05; Georgia State 38–28

Fourth Quarter

- (10:30) ASU TD – Omar Bayless 5-yard pass from Layne Hatcher, Blake Grupe kick
  Drive: 9 plays, 68 yards, 3:07; Georgia State 38–35
- (06:30) GSU TD – Destin Coates 1-yard rush, Brandon Wright kick
  Drive: 8 plays, 75 yards, 4:00; Georgia State 45–35
- (04:27) ASU FG – Blake Grupe 44-yard field goal
  Drive: 7 plays, 48 yards, 2:03; Georgia State 45–38
- (02:05) GSU TD – Destin Coates 2-yard rush, Brandon Wright kick
  Drive: 4 plays, 75 yards, 2:22; Georgia State 52–38

Passing

- ASU – Layne Hatcher: 21/32, 299 yards, 4 TD, 2 INT
- GSU – Dan Ellington: 29/41, 382 yards, 1 TD

Rushing

- ASU – Marcel Murray: 6 carries, 58 yards, 1 TD
- GSU – Tra Barnett: 14 carries, 139 yards, 1 TD

Receiving

- ASU – Omar Bayless: 8 receptions, 154 yards, 3 TD
- GSU – Sam Pinckney: 9 receptions, 120 yards, 1 TD

=== At Coastal Carolina ===
Georgia State Panthers at Coastal Carolina Chanticleers

Quarter	1	2	3	4	Total
Panthers	3	14	14	0	31
Chanticleers	3	3	7	8	21

at Brooks Stadium, Conway, SC

- Date: October 12, 2019
- Game time: 5:00 p.m. EDT
- Game weather: Temperature: 79 °F (26 °C) • Wind: W 5 mph • Weather: Clear Skies
- Game attendance: 17,249
- Referee: Jason Autrey
- TV announcers (ESPN+): Jeff McCarragher (play-by-play) & Nate Ross (analyst)
- ESPN – Ellington, Georgia State run over Coastal Carolina, 31–21 /// Box Score, Georgia State at Coastal Carolina /// Pregame Notes /// Postgame Notes

Game information

First Quarter

- (06:25) GSU FG – Brandon Wright 38-yard field goal
  Drive: 8 plays, 23 yards, 3:35; Georgia State 3–0
- (02:23) CCU FG – Massimo Biscardi 38-yard field goal
  Drive: 9 plays, 55 yards, 4:02; Tied 3–3

Second Quarter

- (12:18) CCU FG – Massimo Biscardi 21-yard field goal
  Drive: 7 plays, 39 yards, 3:03; Coastal Carolina 6–3
- (10:46) GSU TD – Seth Paige 46-yard rush, Brandon Wright kick
  Drive: 4 plays, 75 yards, 1:32; Georgia State 10–6
- (01:51) GSU TD – Cornelius McCoy 11-yard pass from Dan Ellington, Brandon Wright kick
  Drive: 15 plays, 70 yards, 6:22; Georgia State 17–6

Third Quarter

- (10:45) CCU TD – Jaivon Heiligh 20-yard pass from Bryce Carpenter, Massimo Biscardi kick
  Drive: 9 plays, 75 yards, 4:15; Georgia State 17–13
- (07:22) GSU TD – Tra Barnett 26-yard rush, Brandon Wright kick
  Drive: 9 plays, 75 yards, 3:23; Georgia State 24–13
- (02:44) GSU TD – Tra Barnett 2-yard rush, Brandon Wright kick
  Drive: 7 plays, 74 yards, 2:59; Georgia State 31–13

Fourth Quarter

- (10:34) CCU TD – C. J. Marable 5-yard pass from Bryce Carpenter, Ky'Jon Tyler rush
  Drive: 6 plays, 23 yards, 2:55; Georgia State 31–21

Passing

- GSU – Dan Ellington: 16/24, 122 yards, 1 TD, 1 INT
- CCU – Bryce Carpenter: 9/14, 118 yards, 2 TD

Rushing

- GSU – Dan Ellington: 19 carries, 128 yards
- CCU – Fred Payton: 7 carries, 31 yards

Receiving

- GSU – Jonathan Ifedi: 3 receptions, 47 yards
- CCU – Jaivon Heiligh: 6 receptions, 73 yards, 1 TD

=== Army ===
Army Black Knights at Georgia State Panthers

Quarter	1	2	3	4	Total
Black Knights	7	7	7	0	21
Panthers	7	7	6	8	28

at Georgia State Stadium, Atlanta, GA

- Date: October 19, 2019
- Game time: 7:00 p.m. EDT
- Game weather: Temperature: 55 °F (13 °C) • Wind: 14 mph • Weather: Rain
- Game attendance: 21,720
- Referee: Kyle Olson
- TV announcers (ESPN+): Matt Stewart (play-by-play), Wayne Gandy (analyst) & Jael Rucker (sideline)
- ESPN – Ellington passes for 3 TDs in Georgia State's win over Army /// Box Score, Army at Georgia State /// Pregame Notes /// Postgame Notes

Game information

First Quarter

- (07:47) GSU TD – Sam Pinckney 24-yard pass from Dan Ellington, Brandon Wright kick
  Drive: 4 plays, 57 yards, 1:22; Georgia State 7–0
- (02:18) ARMY TD – Sandon McCoy 2-yard rush, Cole Talley kick
  Drive: 9 plays, 75 yards, 5:29; Tied 7–7

Second Quarter

- (07:41) GSU TD – Sam Pinckney 12-yard pass from Dan Ellington, Brandon Wright kick
  Drive: 3 plays, 46 yards, 1:08; Georgia State 14–7
- (01:15) ARMY TD – Sandon McCoy 8-yard rush, Cole Talley kick
  Drive: 12 plays, 75 yards, 6:26; Tied 14–14

Third Quarter

- (08:17) ARMY TD – Jalen Moy 16-yard rush, Cole Talley kick
  Drive: 12 plays, 75 yards, 6:43; Army 21–14
- (01:48) GSU TD – Tra Barnett 1-yard rush, Brandon Wright kick failed
  Drive: 16 plays, 75 yards, 6:29; Army 21–20

Fourth Quarter

- (07:41) GSU TD – Aubry Payne 8-yard pass from Dan Ellington, Roger Carter pass
  Drive: 11 plays, 81 yards, 5:28; Georgia State 28–21

Passing

- ARMY – Kelvin Hopkins Jr.: 6/10, 65 yards, 1 INT
- GSU – Dan Ellington: 20/28, 232 yards, 3 TD

Rushing

- ARMY – Connor Slomka: 10 carries, 89 yards
- GSU – Tra Barnett: 17 carries, 108 yards, 1 TD

Receiving

- ARMY – Cam Harrison: 4 receptions, 58 yards
- GSU – Cornelius McCoy: 7 receptions, 66 yards

=== Troy ===
Troy Trojans at Georgia State Panthers

Quarter	1	2	3	4	Total
Trojans	0	14	0	19	33
Panthers	7	21	7	17	52

at Georgia State Stadium, Atlanta, GA

- Date: October 26, 2019
- Game time: 7:00 p.m. EDT
- Game weather: Temperature: 72 °F (22 °C) • Wind: SE 7 mph • Weather: Periodic Rain
- Game attendance: 14,527
- Referee: Wayne Winkler
- TV announcers (ESPN+): Matt Stewart (play-by-play), Wayne Gandy (analyst) & Jael Rucker (sideline)
- ESPN – Ellington, Barnett lead Georgia State past Troy 52-33 /// Box Score, Troy at Georgia State /// Pregame Notes /// Postgame Notes

Game information

First Quarter

- (11:08) GSU TD – Dan Ellington 19-yard rush, Brandon Wright kick
  Drive: 10 plays, 75 yards, 3:52; Georgia State 7–0

Second Quarter

- (12:19) TROY TD – DK Billingsley 10-yard rush, Tyler Sumpter kick
  Drive: 9 plays, 83 yards, 3:31; Tied 7–7
- (10:33) GSU TD – Aubry Payne 40-yard pass from Dan Ellington, Brandon Wright kick
  Drive: 5 plays, 75 yards, 1:46; Georgia State 14–7
- (08:14) GSU TD – Seth Paige 65-yard rush, Brandon Wright kick
  Drive: 1 play, 65 yards, 0:13; Georgia State 21–7
- (06:20) TROY TD – DK Billingsley 2-yard rush, Tyler Sumpter kick
  Drive: 4 plays, 70 yards, 1:46; Georgia State 21–14
- (02:52) GSU TD – Tra Barnett, 5-yard rush, Brandon Wright kick
  Drive: 9 plays, 75 yards, 3:28; Georgia State 28–14

Third Quarter

- (04:05) GSU TD – Dan Ellington 1-yard rush, Brandon Wright kick
  Drive: 16 plays, 80 yards, 6:55; Georgia State 35–14

Fourth Quarter

- (14:51) TROY TD – AJ Lewis 23-yard pass from Kaleb Barker, Tyler Sumpter kick
  Drive: 11 plays, 98 yards, 4:14; Georgia State 35–21
- (10:52) GSU FG – Brandon Wright 29-yard field goal
  Drive: 8 plays, 31 yards, 3:59; Georgia State 38–21
- (09:03) TROY TD – DK Billingsley 1-yard rush, Luke Whittemore pass failed
  Drive: 6 plays, 75 yards, 1:49; Georgia State 38–27
- (03:51) GSU TD – Roger Carter 4-yard pass from Dan Ellington, Brandon Wright kick
  Drive: 13 plays, 75 yards, 5:12; Georgia State 45–27
- (02:47) TROY TD – Khalil McClain 7-yard pass from Kaleb Barker, Kaleb Barker pass failed
  Drive: 4 plays, 21 yards, 0:51; Georgia State 45–33
- (01:04) GSU TD – Tra Barnett 41-yard rush, Barry Brown kick
  Drive: 4 plays, 50 yards, 1:43; Georgia State 52–33

Passing

- TROY – Kaleb Barker: 34/45, 421 yards, 2 TD
- GSU – Dan Ellington: 18/25, 189 yards, 2 TD, 1 INT

Rushing

- TROY – DK Billingsley: 9 carries, 81 yards, 3 TD
- GSU – Tra Barnett: 34 carries, 242 yards, 2 TD

Receiving

- TROY – Khalil McClain: 8 receptions, 128 yards, 1 TD
- GSU – Aubry Payne: 2 receptions, 51 yards, 1 TD

=== At Louisiana–Monroe ===
Georgia State Panthers at Louisiana–Monroe Warhawks

Quarter	1	2	3	4	Total
Panthers	10	14	7	0	31
Warhawks	14	10	7	14	45

at Malone Stadium, Monroe, LA

- Date: November 9, 2019
- Game time: 4:00 p.m. CST
- Game weather: Temperature: 63 °F (17 °C) • Wind: Calm • Weather: Clear
- Game attendance: 13,213
- Referee: James Carter
- TV announcers (ESPN+): Doug Anderson (play-by-play) & Chris Mycoskie (analyst)
- ESPN – Evans runs, passes UL Monroe to 45–31 win over Georgia State /// Box Score, Georgia State at Louisiana–Monroe /// Pregame Notes Postgame Notes

Game information

First Quarter

- (09:26) GSU FG – Brandon Wright 39-yard field goal
  Drive: 12 plays, 45 yards, 3:38; Georgia State 3–0
- (05:59) ULM TD – Caleb Evans 16-yard rush, Jared Porter kick
  Drive: 9 plays, 77 yards, 3:27; Louisiana–Monroe 7–3
- (03:25) GSU TD – Destin Coates 37-yard rush, Brandon Wright kick
  Drive: 7 plays, 75 yards, 2:34; Georgia State 10–7
- (01:47) ULM TD – Josh Pederson 43-yard pass from Caleb Evans, Jared Porter kick
  Drive: 5 plays, 94 yards, 1:38; Louisiana–Monroe 14–10

Second Quarter

- (12:54) GSU TD – Dan Ellington 40-yard rush, Brandon Wright kick
  Drive: 3 plays, 59 yards, 0:45; Georgia State 17–14
- (09:28) ULM TD – Josh Johnson 10-yard rush, Jared Porter kick
  Drive: 9 plays, 75 yards, 3:26; Louisiana–Monroe 21–17
- (04:50) GSU TD – Tra Barnett 1-yard rush, Brandon Wright kick
  Drive: 12 plays, 75 yards, 4:38; Georgia State 24–21
- (00:43) ULM FG – Jared Porter 31-yard field goal
  Drive: 11 plays, 61 yards, 4:07; Tied 24–24

Third Quarter

- (11:16) ULM TD – Josh Johnson 30-yard rush, Jared Porter kick
  Drive: 3 plays, 82 yards, 0:53; Louisiana–Monroe 31–24
- (08:24) GSU TD – Tra Barnett 7-yard rush, Brandon Wright kick
  Drive: 8 plays, 75 yards, 2:52; Tied 31–31

Fourth Quarter

- (07:40) ULM TD – Markis McCray 1-yard pass from Caleb Evans, Jared Porter kick
  Drive: 11 plays, 65 yards, 5:02; Louisiana–Monroe 38–31
- (02:46) ULM TD – Markis McCray 14-yard pass from Caleb Evans, Jared Porter kick
  Drive: 5 plays, 28 yards, 2:30; Louisiana–Monroe 45–31

Passing

- GSU – Cornelious Brown: 8/18, 80 yards
- ULM – Caleb Evans: 24/32, 291 yards, 3 TD, 1 INT

Rushing

- GSU – Tra Barnett: 32 carries, 190 yards, 2 TD
- ULM – Josh Johnson: 20 carries, 168 yards, 2 TD

Receiving

- GSU – Cornelius McCoy: 5 receptions, 38 yards
- ULM – Zach Jackson: 5 receptions, 91 yards

=== Appalachian State ===
No. 25 Appalachian State Mountaineers at Georgia State Panthers

Quarter	1	2	3	4	Total
No. 25 Mountaineers	14	21	7	14	56
Panthers	21	0	0	6	27

at Georgia State Stadium, Atlanta, GA

- Date: November 16, 2019
- Game time: 7:30 p.m. EST
- Game weather: Temperature: 53 °F (12 °C) • Wind: NE 5 mph • Weather: Clear
- Game attendance: 17,908
- Referee: Jason Autry
- TV announcers (ESPNU): Clay Matvick (play-by-play) & Ryan Leaf (analyst)
- ESPN – Thomas leads Appalachian St. to 56–27 win over Georgia St. /// Box Score, No. 25 Appalachian State at Georgia State /// Pregame Notes /// Postgame Notes

Game information

First Quarter

- (08:20) GSU TD – Devin Gentry 4-yard pass from Dan Ellington, Brandon Wright kick
  Drive: 9 plays, 84 yards, 3:01; Georgia State 7–0
- (05:13) APP TD – Corey Sutton 12-yard pass from Zac Thomas, Chandler Staton kick
  Drive: 8 plays, 89 yards, 3:07; Tied 7–7
- (02:21) GSU TD – Destin Coates 67-yard rush, Brandon Wright kick
  Drive: 3 plays, 81 yards, 1:07; Georgia State 14–7
- (01:38) GSU TD – Chris Bacon 34-yard interception return, Brandon Wright kick
  Drive: 0 plays, 0 yards, 0:00; Georgia State 21–7
- (00:09) APP TD – Corey Sutton 20-yard pass from Zac Thomas, Chandler Staton kick
  Drive: 5 plays, 75 yards, 1:29; Georgia State 21–14

Second Quarter

- (06:20) APP TD – Zac Thomas 3-yard rush, Chandler Staton kick
  Drive: 10 plays, 55 yards, 4:44; Tied 21–21
- (02:18) APP TD – Shaun Jolly 30-yard interception return, Chandler Staton kick
  Drive: 0 plays, 0 yards, 0:00; Appalachian State 28–21
- (00:22) APP TD – Darrynton Evans 1-yard pass from Zac Thomas, Chandler Staton kick
  Drive: 5 plays, 48 yards, 0:33; Appalachian State 35–21

Third Quarter

- (05:58) APP TD – Darrynton Evans 29-yard rush, Chandler Staton kick
  Drive: 4 plays, 73 yards, 1:43; Appalachian State 42–21

Fourth Quarter

- (14:55) APP TD – Corey Sutton 24-yard pass from Zac Thomas, Chandler Staton kick
  Drive: 7 plays, 51 yards, 3:30; Appalachian State 49–21
- (11:04) APP TD – Raykwon Anderson 5-yard rush, Chandler Staton kick
  Drive: 4 plays, 62 yards, 2:05; Appalachian State 56–21
- (05:35) GSU TD – Tucker Gregg 20-yard rush, Barry Brown kick failed
  Drive: 3 plays, 63 yards, 1:01; Appalachian State 56–27

Passing

- APP – Zac Thomas: 19/31, 256 yards, 4 TD, 1 INT
- GSU – Dan Ellington: 12/27, 88 yards, 1 TD, 2 INT

Rushing

- APP – Darrynton Evans: 18 carries, 131 yards, 1 TD
- GSU – Destin Coates: 7 carries, 97 yards, 1 TD

Receiving

- APP – Corey Sutton: 8 receptions, 173 yards, 3 TD
- GSU – Cadarrius Thompson: 1 reception, 34 yards

=== South Alabama ===
South Alabama Jaguars at Georgia State Panthers

Quarter	1	2	3	4	Total
Jaguars	3	0	0	12	15
Panthers	0	14	7	7	28

at Georgia State Stadium, Atlanta, GA

- Date: November 23, 2019
- Game time: 2:00 p.m. EST
- Game attendance: 12,501
- Referee: Jeremy Parker
- TV announcers (ESPN+): Matt Stewart (play-by-play) & Wayne Gandy (analyst)
- ESPN – Ellington leads Georgia State past South Alabama 28–15 /// Box Score, South Alabama at Georgia State /// Pregame Notes /// Postgame Notes

Game information

First Quarter

- (09:57) USA FG – Diego Guajardo 34-yard field goal
  Drive: 8 plays, 29 yards, 3:53; South Alabama 3–0

Second Quarter

- (13:14) GSU TD – Destin Coates 6-yard rush, Brandon Wright kick
  Drive: 13 plays, 82 yards, 4:36; Georgia State 7–3
- (06:39) GSU TD – Devin Gentry 5-yard pass from Dan Ellington, Brandon Wright kick
  Drive: 9 plays, 65 yards, 4:17; Georgia State 14–3

Third Quarter

- (05:52) GSU TD – Tra Barnett 2-yard rush, Brandon Wright kick
  Drive: 7 plays, 75 yards, 2:52; Georgia State 21–3

Fourth Quarter

- (14:53) GSU TD – Roger Carter 4-yard pass from Dan Ellington, Barry Brown kick
  Drive: 10 plays, 76 yards, 4:28; Georgia State 28–3
- (05:56) USA TD – Jalen Wayne 20-yard pass from Desmond Trotter, Diego Guajardo kick failed
  Drive: 5 plays, 61 yards, 1:36; Georgia State 28–9
- (00:49) USA TD – Jalen Tolbert 52-yard pass from Desmond Trotter, Desmond Trotter pass failed
  Drive: 1 play, 52 yards, 0:09; Georgia State 28–15

Passing

- USA – Desmond Trotter: 12/25, 218 yards, 2 TD, 1 INT
- GSU – Dan Ellington: 21/27, 208 yards, 2 TD, 1 INT

Rushing

- USA – Tra Minter: 18 carries, 70 yards
- GSU – Tra Barnett: 23 carries, 128 yards, 1 TD

Receiving

- USA – Jalen Tolbert: 2 receptions, 74 yards, 1 TD
- GSU – Roger Carter: 7 receptions, 87 yards, 1 TD

=== At Georgia Southern ===
Modern Day Hate: Georgia State Panthers at Georgia Southern Eagles

Quarter	1	2	3	4	Total
Panthers	7	0	3	0	10
Eagles	7	10	14	7	38

at Paulson Stadium, Statesboro, GA

- Date: November 30, 2019
- Game time: 6:00 p.m. EST
- Game weather: Temperature: 62 °F (17 °C) • Wind: Calm • Weather: Clear
- Game attendance: 15,175
- Referee: Wayne Winkler
- TV announcers (ESPN+): Greg Talbott (play-by-play), Danny Waugh (analyst) & Amy Zimmer (sideline)
- ESPN – King, Georgia Southern run past Georgia State, 38–10 /// Box Score, Georgia State at Georgia Southern /// Pregame Notes /// Postgame Notes

Game information

First Quarter

- (07:59) GSU TD – Tra Barnett 15-yard rush, Brandon Wright kick
  Drive: 9 plays, 86 yards, 3:44; Georgia State 7–0
- (03:24) GASO TD – Shai Werts 11-yard rush, Tyler Bass kick
  Drive: 8 plays, 75 yards, 4:35; Tied 7–7

Second Quarter

- (10:00) GASO FG – Tyler Bass 49-yard field goal
  Drive: 6 plays, 37 yards, 3:20; Georgia Southern 10–7
- (02:59) GASO TD – J.D. King 7-yard rush, Tyler Bass kick
  Drive: 9 plays, 73 yards, 5:07; Georgia Southern 17–7

Third Quarter

- (12:08) GASO TD – Wesley Kennedy III 13-yard rush, Tyler Bass kick
  Drive: 5 plays, 51 yards, 2:37; Georgia Southern 24–7
- (03:53) GASO TD – J.D. King 13-yard rush, Tyler Bass kick
  Drive: 6 plays, 43 yards, 3:23; Georgia Southern 31–7
- (00:38) GSU FG – Brandon Wright 35-yard field goal
  Drive: 9 plays, 57 yards, 3:15; Georgia Southern 31–10

Fourth Quarter

- (07:06) GASO TD – J.D. King 30-yard rush, Tyler Bass kick
  Drive: 7 plays, 61 yards, 4:07; Georgia Southern 38–10

Passing

- GSU – Dan Ellington: 18/27, 182 yards
- GASO – Shai Werts: 7/10, 73 yards

Rushing

- GSU – Destin Coates: 4 carries, 54 yards
- GASO – J.D. King: 16 carries, 107 yards, 3 TD

Receiving

- GSU – Cornelius McCoy: 7 receptions, 89 yards
- GASO – Khaleb Hood: 2 receptions, 28 yards

=== Vs. Wyoming – Arizona Bowl ===
NOVA Home Loans Arizona Bowl: Wyoming Cowboys vs. Georgia State Panthers

Quarter	1	2	3	4	Total
Cowboys	17	7	14	0	38
Panthers	7	3	7	0	17

at Arizona Stadium, Tucson, AZ

- Date: December 31, 2019
- Game time: 2:30 p.m. MST
- TV announcers (CBSSN): Rich Waltz (play-by-play), Aaron Murray (analyst) & John Schriffen (sideline)
- ESPN – 2019 NOVA Home Loans Arizona Bowl, Wyoming Cowboys vs. Georgia State Panthers, Preview /// Pregame Notes

Game information

First Quarter
Second Quarter
Third Quarter
Fourth Quarter

Passing

- WYO –
- GSU –

Rushing

- WYO –
- GSU –

Receiving

- WYO –
- GSU –
