= Omar Bayless =

American football player (born 1996)

Profile
- Position: Wide receiver

Personal information
- Born: December 15, 1996 (age 29); Laurel, Mississippi, U.S.
- Listed height: 6 ft 1 in (1.85 m)
- Listed weight: 210 lb (95 kg)

Career information
- High school: Laurel
- College: Arkansas State (2015–2019)
- NFL draft: 2020: undrafted

Career history
- 2020–2021: Carolina Panthers*
- 2022: Kansas City Chiefs*
- 2023: Hamilton Tiger-Cats
- * Offseason or practice squad member only

Awards and highlights
- Sun Belt Player of the Year (2019); First-team All-Sun Belt (2019)

Career CFL statistics
- Receptions: 17
- Receiving yards: 214
- Receiving touchdowns: 2
- Stats at Pro Football Reference
- Stats at CFL.ca

Omar Bayless (born December 15, 1996) is an American professional football player. He played college football for the Arkansas State Red Wolves.

== College career ==
Bayless played college football at Arkansas State University. As a senior in 2019, he finished second in the nation in receiving yards behind Ja'Marr Chase with 1,653 and was named the Sun Belt Conference Player of the Year. During his career he had 177 receptions for 2,775 yards and 26 touchdowns.

== Professional career ==
Pre-draft measurables
| Height | Weight | Arm length | Hand span | Wingspan | 40-yard dash | 10-yard split | 20-yard split | 20-yard shuttle | Three-cone drill | Vertical jump | Broad jump | Bench press |
|---|---|---|---|---|---|---|---|---|---|---|---|---|
| 6 ft 0 3/4 in (1.85 m) | 212 lb (96 kg) | 31 7/8 in (0.81 m) | 9 in (0.23 m) | 6 ft 4 7/8 in (1.95 m) | 4.62 s | 1.55 s | 2.72 s | 4.50 s | 7.35 s | 36.0 in (0.91 m) | 10 ft 3 in (3.12 m) | 11 reps |
All values from NFL Combine

Bayless signed with the Carolina Panthers as an undrafted free agent in 2020. He spent 2022 with the Kansas City Chiefs and was released before the season.

Bayless signed with the Hamilton Tiger-Cats of the Canadian Football League in 2023. He was released by the Tiger-Cats on June 1, 2024.
