= Josh Johnson (running back) =

American football player (born 1997)

No. 34
- Position: Running back

Personal information
- Born: December 26, 1997 (age 28); Hurtsboro, Alabama, U.S.
- Listed height: 5 ft 9 in (1.75 m)
- Listed weight: 208 lb (94 kg)

Career information
- High school: Opelika (Opelika, Alabama)
- College: Louisiana–Monroe
- NFL draft: 2021: undrafted

Career history
- Seattle Seahawks (2021–2022)

Awards and highlights
- Second-team All-Sun Belt (2019)
- Stats at Pro Football Reference

Josh Johnson (born December 26, 1997) is an American former professional football player who was a running back for the Seattle Seahawks of the National Football League (NFL). He played college football for the Louisiana–Monroe Warhawks.

== Professional career ==
Pre-draft measurables
Height	Weight	Arm length	Hand span	Wingspan	40-yard dash	10-yard split	20-yard split	20-yard shuttle	Three-cone drill	Vertical jump	Broad jump	Bench press
5 ft 8 7/8 in (1.75 m)	209 lb (95 kg)	29 5/8 in (0.75 m)	8 1/2 in (0.22 m)	5 ft 11 7/8 in (1.83 m)	4.61 s	1.63 s	2.61 s	4.40 s	7.16 s	35.5 in (0.90 m)	9 ft 7 in (2.92 m)	22 reps
All values from NFL Combine/Pro Day

Johnson was signed by the Seattle Seahawks as an undrafted free agent on May 13, 2020. He was waived on August 31, 2021, during final roster cuts, but re-signed to the team's practice squad the following day. Johnson was elevated to the active roster on November 29, 2021, for the team's Week 12 game against the Washington Football Team. He was signed to the active roster on January 4, 2022.

On August 30, 2022, Johnson was waived/injured by the Seahawks and placed on injured reserve. He was released on September 8.
