= 2019 Troy Trojans football team =

American college football season

2019 Troy Trojans football
- Conference: Sun Belt Conference
- East Division
- Record: 5–7 (3–5 Sun Belt)
- Head coach: Chip Lindsey (1st season)
- Offensive coordinator: Ryan Pugh (1st season)
- Offensive scheme: Spread
- Defensive coordinator: Brandon Hall (1st season)
- Base defense: 4–3
- Home stadium: Veterans Memorial Stadium

Uniform
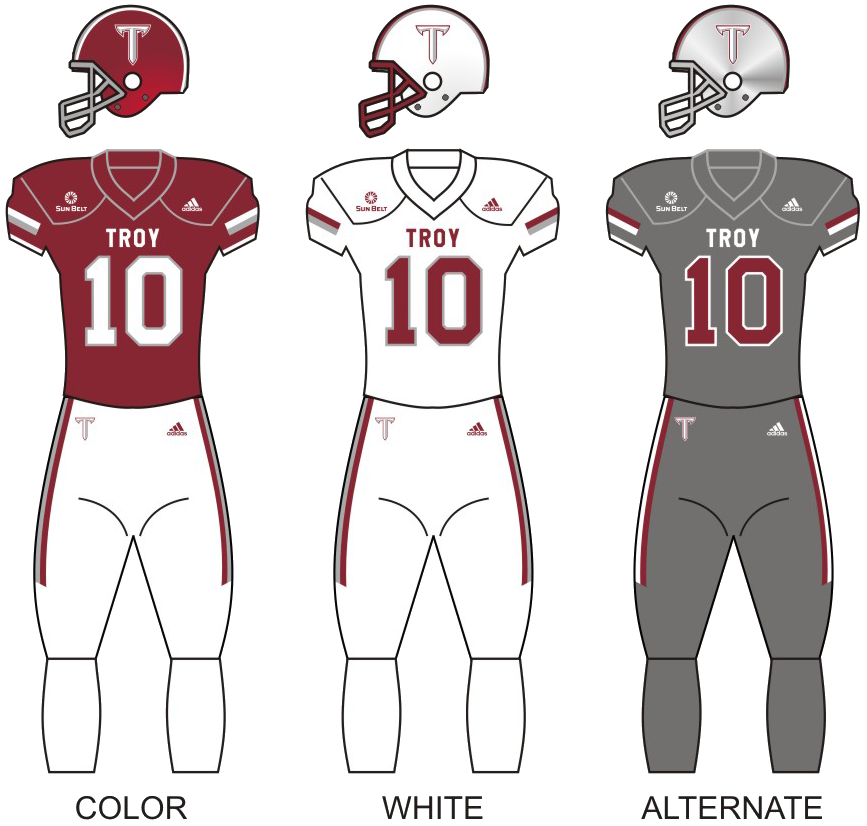

2019 Sun Belt Conference football standings
	Conf.			Overall
Team	W		L	W		L
East Division
No. 19 Appalachian State x$	7	–	1	13	–	1
Georgia Southern	5	–	3	7	–	6
Georgia State	4	–	4	7	–	6
Troy	3	–	5	5	–	7
Coastal Carolina	2	–	6	5	–	7
West Division
Louisiana x	7	–	1	11	–	3
Arkansas State	5	–	3	8	–	5
Louisiana–Monroe	4	–	4	5	–	7
Texas State	2	–	6	3	–	9
South Alabama	1	–	7	2	–	10
Championship: Appalachian State 45, Louisiana 38
$ – Conference champion; x – Division champion/co-champions; Rankings from AP Poll

The 2019 Troy Trojans football team represented Troy University in the 2019 NCAA Division I FBS football season. The Trojans played their home games at Veterans Memorial Stadium in Troy, Alabama, and competed in the East Division of the Sun Belt Conference. They were led by first-year head coach Chip Lindsey.

== Schedule ==
Date	Time	Opponent	Site	TV	Result	Attendance
August 31	5:00 p.m.	Campbell*	Veterans Memorial Stadium; Troy, AL	ESPN+	W 43–14	23,172
September 14	5:00 p.m.	Southern Miss*	Veterans Memorial Stadium; Troy, AL	ESPN+	L 42–47	27,108
September 21	2:00 p.m.	at Akron*	InfoCision Stadium; Akron, OH	ESPN+	W 35–7	16,954
September 28	5:00 p.m.	Arkansas State	Veterans Memorial Stadium; Troy, AL	ESPN+	L 43–50	26,437
October 5	3:00 p.m.	at Missouri*	Faurot Field; Columbia, MO	SECN	L 10–42	50,023
October 16	7:00 p.m.	South Alabama	Veterans Memorial Stadium; Troy, AL (rivalry)	ESPN2	W 37–13	23,182
October 26	6:00 p.m.	at Georgia State	Georgia State Stadium; Atlanta, GA	ESPN+	L 33–52	14,527
November 2	2:00 p.m.	at Coastal Carolina	Brooks Stadium; Conway, SC	ESPN3	L 35–36	15,098
November 9	3:30 p.m.	Georgia Southern^{†}	Veterans Memorial Stadium; Troy, AL	ESPN+	W 49–28	22,108
November 16	2:00 p.m.	at Texas State	Bobcat Stadium; San Marcos, TX	ESPN3	W 63–27	15,619
November 23	4:00 p.m.	at Louisiana	Cajun Field; Lafayette, LA	ESPN+	L 3–53	14,262
November 29	5:00 p.m.	No. 25 Appalachian State	Veterans Memorial Stadium; Troy, AL	ESPN+	L 13–48	18,989
*Non-conference game; ^{†}Homecoming; Rankings from AP Poll and CFP Rankings after November 5 released prior to game; All times are in Central time

== Game summaries ==
=== Campbell ===
	1	2	3	4	Total
Fighting Camels	7	0	0	7	14
Trojans	17	3	16	7	43

=== Southern Miss ===
	1	2	3	4	Total
Golden Eagles	14	3	9	21	47
Trojans	7	7	7	21	42

=== At Akron ===
	1	2	3	4	Total
Trojans	7	14	14	0	35
Zips	7	0	0	0	7

=== Arkansas State ===
	1	2	3	4	Total
Red Wolves	21	10	14	5	50
Trojans	10	21	6	6	43

=== At Missouri ===
	1	2	3	4	Total
Trojans	7	0	3	0	10
Tigers	21	21	0	0	42

=== South Alabama ===
	1	2	3	4	Total
Jaguars	3	7	3	0	13
Trojans	3	13	7	14	37

=== At Georgia State ===
	1	2	3	4	Total
Trojans	0	14	0	19	33
Panthers	7	21	7	17	52

=== At Coastal Carolina ===
	1	2	3	4	Total
Trojans	21	0	7	7	35
Chanticleers	14	3	11	8	36

=== Georgia Southern ===
	1	2	3	4	Total
Eagles	0	14	0	14	28
Trojans	14	13	0	22	49

=== At Texas State ===
Troy at Texas State – Game summary

Quarter	1	2	3	4	Total
Trojans	14	21	7	21	63
Bobcats	3	7	10	7	27

at Bobcat Stadium, San Marcos, TX

- Date: November 16
- Game time: 2:00 p.m. CDT
- Game weather: 65 °F (18 °C); partly cloudy
- Game attendance: 15,619
- Referee: Wayne Winkler
- TV: ESPN3

Game information

First quarter

- (07:30) TXST FG – Joshua Rowland 33-yard field goal
  Texas State 3–0; Drive: 11 plays, 50 yards, 5:42
- (03:44) TROY TD – Trevon Woolfork 13-yard pass from Kaleb Barker, Tyler Sumpter kick
  Troy 7–3; Drive: 11 plays, 83 yards, 3:39
- (00:03) TROY TD – AJ Lewis 3-yard pass from Kaleb Barker, Tyler Sumpter kick
  Troy 14–3; Drive: 4 plays, 53 yards, 1:20

Second quarter

- (13:30) TXST TD – Robert Brown Jr. 21-yard rush, Joshua Rowland kick
  Troy 14–10; Drive: 4 plays, 57 yards, 1:30
- (08:56) TROY TD – Reggie Todd 38-yard pass from Kaleb Barker, Tyler Sumpter kick
  Troy 21–10; Drive: 5 plays, 50 yards, 1:24
- (06:34) TROY TD – Trevon Woolfork 13-yard pass from Kaleb Barker, Tyler Sumpter kick
  Troy 28–10; Drive: 6 plays, 57 yards, 1:26
- (02:20) TROY TD – Luke Whittemore 1-yard pass from Kaleb Barker, Tyler Sumpter kick
  Troy 35–10; Drive: 5 plays, 47 yards, 1:10

Third quarter

- (09:42) TROY TD – Khalil McClain 2-yard pass from Kaleb Barker, Tyler Sumpter kick
  Troy 42–10; Drive: 10 plays, 48 yards, 3:43
- (07:46) TXST FG – Joshua Rowland 35-yard field goal
  Troy 42–13; Drive: 7 plays, 57 yards, 1:56
- (02:08) TXST TD – Hutch White 35-yard pass from Tyler Vitt, Joshua Rowland kick
  Troy 42–20; Drive: 8 plays, 83 yards, 3:47

Fourth quarter

- (13:26) TROY TD – Jabir Daughtry-Frye 6-yard rush, Tyler Sumpter kick
  Troy 49–20; Drive: 8 plays, 82 yards, 3:36
- (09:40) TXST TD – Javen Banks 39-yard pass from Tyler Vitt, Joshua Rowland kick
  Troy 49–27; Drive: 2 plays, 50 yards, 0:30
- (01:41) TROY TD – Trevon Woolfolk 2-yard rush, Evan Legassey kick
  Troy 56–27; Drive: 8 plays, 39 yards, 5:18
- (00:08) TROY TD – Carlton Martial 64-yard interception returned, Evan Legassey kick
  Troy 63–27; Drive: 5 plays, 30 yards, 1:21

Top passers

- TROY – Kaleb Barker – 30/43, 363 yards, 6 TD
- TXST – Tyler Vitt – 29/44, 263 yards, 2 TD, 4 INT

Top rushers

- TROY – DK Billingsley – 12 carries, 40 yards
- TXST – Robert Brown Jr. – 4 carries, 67 yards, TD

Top receivers

- TROY – Kaylon Geiger – 8 receptions, 61 yards
- TXST – Hutch White – 7 receptions, 80 yards, TD

Statistics	Troy	Texas State
First downs	25	21
Total yards	471	416
Rushing yards	103	153
Passing yards	368	263
Turnovers	0	4
Time of possession	31:27	28:33

=== At Louisiana ===
Troy at Louisiana

Team	1	2	3	4	Total
Trojans	3	0	0	0	3
• RV Ragin' Cajuns	14	17	19	3	53

- Date: November 23, 2019
- Location: Cajun Field
  Lafayette, LA
- Game start: 4:05 p.m. CST
- Elapsed time: 3 hours and 20 minutes
- Game attendance: 14,262
- Game weather: 61 °F (16 °C) • Weather: Sunny • Wind: 7 NW MPH
- Referee: Jason Autrey
- Television network: ESPN+

Scoring summary
1	11:41	LA	Ja'Marcus Bradley 12–yard pass from Levi Lewis (Stevie Artigue kick) (10 plays, 69 yards, 3:19)	LA 7–0
1	03:37	TROY	Tyler Sumpter 30–yard field goal (9 plays, 45 yards, 3:33)	LA 7–3
1	00:55	LA	Raymond Calais 27–yard rush (Stevie Artigue kick) (6 plays, 61 yards, 2:42)	LA 14–3
2	11:44	LA	Trey Ragas 1–yard rush (Stevie Artigue kick) (6 plays, 72 yards, 2:24)	LA 21–3
2	08:18	LA	Elijah Mitchell 11–yard rush (Stevie Artigue kick) (6 plays, 67 yards, 2:48)	LA 28–3
2	00:17	LA	Stevie Artigue 49–yard field goal (11 plays, 48 yards, 1:59)	LA 31–3
3	11:34	LA	Stevie Artigue 44–yard field goal (5 plays, 18 yards, 1:58)	LA 34–3
3	11:16	LA	Team Safety (0 plays, 0 yards, 0:00)	LA 36–3
3	08:26	LA	Trey Ragas 8–yard rush (Stevie Artigue kick) (7 plays, 59 yards, 2:50)	LA 43–3
3	05:36	LA	Chris Smith 80–yard rush (Stevie Artigue kick) (1 play, 80 yards, 0:16)	LA 50–3
4	09:50	LA	Stevie Artigue 31–yard field goal (13 plays, 83 yards, 7:39)	LA 53–3

Statistics	Troy	Louisiana
First downs	22	28
Total yards	359	598
Rushing yards	156	254
Passing yards	203	344
Turnovers	3	0
Time of possession	27:04	32:56

Team	Category	Player	Statistics
Troy	Passing	Kaleb Barker	15–32, 178 yards, 2 INTs
Troy	Rushing	DK Billingsley	10 carries, 68 yards
Troy	Receiving	Kaylon Geiger	6 receptions, 44 yards
Louisiana	Passing	Levi Lewis	21–33, 273 yards, 1 TD
Louisiana	Rushing	Chris Smith	5 carries, 87 yards, 1 TD
Louisiana	Receiving	Ja'Marcus Bradley	5 receptions, 96 yards, 1 TD

=== Appalachian State ===
	1	2	3	4	Total
No. 25 Mountaineers	20	14	7	7	48
Trojans	10	3	0	0	13
