= 2019 Coastal Carolina Chanticleers football team =

American college football season

2019 Coastal Carolina Chanticleers football
- Conference: Sun Belt Conference
- East Division
- Record: 5–7 (2–6 Sun Belt)
- Head coach: Jamey Chadwell (2nd season)
- Co-offensive coordinators: Newland Isaac (1st season); Willy Korn (1st season)
- Offensive scheme: Up-tempo spread
- Defensive coordinator: Chad Staggs (1st season)
- Base defense: 4–2–5
- Home stadium: Brooks Stadium

2019 Sun Belt Conference football standings
	Conf.			Overall
Team	W		L	W		L
East Division
No. 19 Appalachian State x$	7	–	1	13	–	1
Georgia Southern	5	–	3	7	–	6
Georgia State	4	–	4	7	–	6
Troy	3	–	5	5	–	7
Coastal Carolina	2	–	6	5	–	7
West Division
Louisiana x	7	–	1	11	–	3
Arkansas State	5	–	3	8	–	5
Louisiana–Monroe	4	–	4	5	–	7
Texas State	2	–	6	3	–	9
South Alabama	1	–	7	2	–	10
Championship: Appalachian State 45, Louisiana 38
$ – Conference champion; x – Division champion/co-champions; Rankings from AP Poll

The 2019 Coastal Carolina Chanticleers football team represented Coastal Carolina University as a member of the East Division of the Sun Belt Conference during the 2019 NCAA Division I FBS football season. Led by second-year head coach Jamey Chadwell, the Chanticleers compiled an overall record of 5–7 with a mark of 2–6 in conference play, placing last out of five teams in the Sun Belt's East Division. Coastal Carolina played home games at Brooks Stadium in Conway, South Carolina. Chadwell has served as interim head coach in 2017 during Joe Moglia's absence and then succeeded Moglia as head coach on a permanent basis after the 2018 season.

== Schedule ==
Date	Time	Opponent	Site	TV	Result	Attendance
August 31	3:30 p.m.	Eastern Michigan*	Brooks Stadium; Conway, SC	ESPN+	L 23–30	14,237
September 7	7:00 p.m.	at Kansas*	David Booth Kansas Memorial Stadium; Lawrence, KS	ESPN+	W 12–7	33,493
September 14	2:00 p.m.	Norfolk State*	Brooks Stadium; Conway, SC	ESPN3	W 46–7	13,659
September 21	1:00 p.m.	at UMass*	Warren McGuirk Alumni Stadium; Hadley, MA	NESN, FloSports	W 62–28	8,557
September 28	2:30 p.m.	at Appalachian State	Kidd Brewer Stadium; Boone, NC	ESPN+	L 37–56	25,055
October 12	5:00 p.m.	Georgia State	Brooks Stadium; Conway, SC	ESPN+	L 21–31	17,249
October 19	3:00 p.m.	at Georgia Southern	Paulson Stadium; Statesboro, GA	ESPN3	L 27–30 ^{3OT}	11,015
November 2	3:00 p.m.	Troy^{†}	Brooks Stadium; Conway, SC	ESPN3	W 36–35	15,098
November 7	7:30 p.m.	Louisiana	Brooks Stadium; Conway, SC	ESPNU	L 7–48	14,857
November 16	3:00 p.m.	at Arkansas State	Centennial Bank Stadium; Jonesboro, AR	ESPN3	L 27–28	18,927
November 23	5:00 p.m.	at Louisiana–Monroe	Malone Stadium; Monroe, LA	ESPN3	L 42–45	10,135
November 30	Noon	Texas State	Brooks Stadium; Conway, SC	ESPN+	W 24–21	15,102
*Non-conference game; ^{†}Homecoming; All times are in Eastern time

== Game summaries ==
=== Eastern Michigan ===
	1	2	3	4	Total
Eagles	0	7	16	7	30
Chanticleers	10	3	0	10	23

=== At Kansas ===
	1	2	3	4	Total
Chanticleers	0	6	6	0	12
Jayhawks	7	0	0	0	7

=== Norfolk State ===
	1	2	3	4	Total
Spartans	0	7	0	0	7
Chanticleers	12	7	14	13	46

=== At UMass ===
	1	2	3	4	Total
Chanticleers	14	28	14	6	62
Minutemen	7	7	7	7	28

=== At Appalachian State ===
	1	2	3	4	Total
Chanticleers	14	7	9	7	37
Mountaineers	14	21	7	14	56

=== Georgia State ===
	1	2	3	4	Total
Panthers	3	14	14	0	31
Chanticleers	3	3	7	8	21

=== At Georgia Southern ===
	1	2	3	4	OT	2OT	3OT	Total
Chanticleers	0	7	0	3	7	7	3	27
Eagles	3	7	0	0	7	7	6	30

=== Troy ===
	1	2	3	4	Total
Trojans	21	0	7	7	35
Chanticleers	14	3	11	8	36

=== Louisiana ===
Louisiana at Coastal Carolina

Team	1	2	3	4	Total
• Ragin' Cajuns	14	10	21	3	48
Chanticleers	0	0	0	7	7

- Date: November 7, 2019
- Location: Brooks Stadium
  Conway, SC
- Game start: 7:32 p.m. CST
- Elapsed time: 3 hours and 5 minutes
- Game attendance: 14,857
- Game weather: 66 °F (19 °C) • Weather: Clear • Wind: 1 NW MPH
- Referee: Wayne Winkler
- Television network: ESPNU

Scoring summary
1	11:19	LA	Levi Lewis 6–yard rush (Stevie Artigue kick) (8 plays, 66 yards, 3:41)	LA 7–0
1	03:31	LA	Trey Ragas 1–yard rush (Stevie Artigue kick) (9 plays, 80 yards, 4:29)	LA 14–0
2	07:17	LA	Neal Johnson 1–yard pass from Levi Lewis (Stevie Artigue kick) (12 plays, 80 yards, 5:35)	LA 21–0
2	00:47	LA	Stevie Artigue 21–yard field goal (11 plays, 55 yards, 4:52)	LA 24–0
3	11:50	LA	Jalen Williams 10–yard pass from Levi Lewis (Stevie Artigue kick) (8 plays, 65 yards, 2:17)	LA 31–0
3	03:55	LA	Ja'Marcus Bradley 10–yard pass from Levi Lewis (Stevie Artigue kick) (6 plays, 67 yards, 2:35)	LA 38–0
3	00:24	LA	Chris Smith 52–yard rush (Stevie Artigue kick) (1 play, 52 yards, 0:13)	LA 45–0
4	08:22	LA	Stevie Artigue 28–yard field goal (13 plays, 62 yards, 5:32)	LA 48–0
4	03:58	CCU	Sam Denmark 44–yard pass from Fred Payton (Massimo Biscardi kick) (7 plays, 75 yards, 4:24)	LA 48–7

Statistics	Louisiana	Coastal Carolina
First downs	30	14
Total yards	564	236
Rushing yards	225	103
Passing yards	339	133
Turnovers	0	1
Time of possession	33:26	26:34

Team	Category	Player	Statistics
Louisiana	Passing	Levi Lewis	26–30, 296 yards, 3 TDs
Louisiana	Rushing	Chris Smith	8 carries, 99 yards, 1 TD
Louisiana	Receiving	Ja'Marcus Bradley	7 receptions, 71 yards, 1 TD
Coastal Carolina	Passing	Bryce Carpenter	9-20, 71 yards
Coastal Carolina	Rushing	C. J. Marable	10 carries, 54 yards
Coastal Carolina	Receiving	Sam Denmark	1 reception, 44 yards, 1 TD

=== At Arkansas State ===
	1	2	3	4	Total
Chanticleers	3	10	0	14	27
Red Wolves	7	0	14	7	28

=== At Louisiana–Monroe ===
Week Eleven: Coastal Carolina Chanticleers at Louisiana–Monroe Warhawks – Game summary

Quarter	1	2	3	4	Total
Chanticleers	14	0	14	14	42
Warhawks	14	7	10	14	45

at Malone Stadium • Monroe, LA

- Date: November 23
- Game time: 5:00 p.m. EST
- Game weather: 54° · Wind – WNW 14 · Clear
- Game attendance: 10,135
- Referee: Wayne Winkler
- TV: ESPN3

Game information

First quarter

- (12:32) CCU TD – CJ Marable 3-yard rush, Massimo Biscardi kick
  Coastal Carolina 7–0; Drive: 5 plays, 75 yards, 2:28
- (11:11) ULM TD – Jake Johnson 12-yard rush, Jared Porter kick
  Tied 7–7; Drive: 5 plays, 67 yards, 1:21
- (05:55) ULM TD – Markis McCray 98-yard pass from Caleb Evans, Jared Porter kick
  Louisiana–Monroe 14–7; Drive: 1 play, 98 yards, 0:12
- (00:57) CCU TD – Jaivon Heiligh 16-yard pass from Fred Payton, Massimo Biscardi kick
  Tied 14–14; Drive: 9 plays, 75 yards, 4:58

Second quarter

- (08:52) ULM TD – Austin Vaughn 10-yard rush, Jared Porter kick
  Louisiana–Monroe 21–14; Drive: 6 plays, 74 yards, 2:03

Third quarter

- (11:19) ULM FG – Jared Porter 37-yard field goal
  Louisiana–Monroe 24–14; Drive: 12 plays, 58 yards, 3:41
- (07:35) CCU TD – Ky'Jon Tyler 29-yard pass from Fred Payton, Massimo Biscardi kick
  Louisiana–Monroe 24–21; Drive: 10 plays, 75 yards, 3:44
- (05:38) CCU TD – Ky'Jon Tyler 72-yard punt returned, Massimo Biscardi kick
  Coastal Carolina 28–24; Drive: 3 plays, -1 yards, 1:57
- (01:52) ULM TD – Caleb Evans 32-yard rush, Jared Porter kick
  Louisiana–Monroe 31–28; Drive: 8 plays, 67 yards, 3:46

Fourth quarter

- (12:17) CCU TD – Reese White 41-yard pass from Fred Payton, Massimo Biscardi kick
  Coastal Carolina 35–31; Drive: 10 plays, 75 yards, 4:35
- (07:44) ULM TD – Josh Johnson 12-yard rush, Jared Porter kick
  Louisiana–Monroe 38–35; Drive: 12 plays, 75 yards, 4:33
- (07:30) CCU TD – CJ Marable 75-yard rush, Massimo Biscardi kick
  Coastal Carolina 42–38; Drive: 1 play, 75 yards, 0:43
- (06:47) ULM TD – Zach Jackson 34-yard pass from Caleb Evans, Jared Porter kick
  Louisiana–Monroe 45–42; Drive: 3 plays, 75 yards, 0:43

Leading Passers

- CCU – Fred Payton – 10/16, 158 yards, 3 TD
- ULM – Caleb Evans – 20/34, 349 yards, 2 TD, INT

Leading Rushers

- CCU – CJ Marable – 18 carries, 172 yards, 2 TD
- ULM – Josh Johnson – 19 carries, 129 yards, 2 TD

Leading Receivers

- CCU – Larry Collins Jr. – 2 receptions, 60 yards
- ULM – Markis McCray – 4 receptions, 117 yards, TD

Statistics	Coastal Carolina	Louisiana–Monroe
First downs	22	27
Total yards	452	563
Rushing yards	230	214
Passing yards	222	349
Turnovers	2	1
Time of possession	33:12	26:48

=== Texas State ===
Texas State at Coastal Carolina – Game summary

Quarter	1	2	3	4	Total
Bobcats	0	7	0	14	21
Chanticleers	0	7	7	10	24

at Brooks Stadium, Conway, SC

- Date: November 30
- Game time: 12:00 p.m. EST
- Game weather: partly cloudy
- Game attendance: 15,102
- Referee: Jason Autrey
- TV: ESPN+

Game information

Second quarter

- (07:39) CCU TD – Shadell Bell 1-yard pass from Fred Payton, Massimo Biscardi kick
  Coastal Carolina 7–0; Drive: 13 plays, 64 yards, 6:24
- (03:07) TXST TD – Mason Hays 64-yard pass from Tyler Vitt, Alan Orona kick
  Tied 7–7; Drive: 1 play, 64 yards, 0:11

Third quarter

- (03:42) CCU TD – Isaiah Likely 28-yard pass from Bryce Carpenter, Massimo Biscardi kick
  Coastal Carolina 14–7; Drive: 11 plays, 71 yards, 6:23

Fourth quarter

- (11:30) CCU FG – Massimo Biscardi 47-yard field goal
  Coastal Carolina 17–7; Drive: 11 plays, 50 yards, 6:02
- (09:38) TXST TD – Tyler Vitt 8-yard pass from Hutch White, Alan Orona kick
  Coastal Carolina 17–14; Drive: 4 plays, 67 yards, 1:44
- (04:03) CCU TD – CJ Marable 3-yard rush, Massimo Biscardi kick
  Coastal Carolina 24–14; Drive: 10 plays, 69 yards, 5:25
- (01:31) TXST TD – Jacoby Hopkins 18-yard pass from Tyler Vitt, Alan Orona kick
  Coastal Carolina 24–21; Drive: 9 plays, 71 yards, 2:24

Top passers

- TXST – Tyler Vitt – 23/33, 285 yards, 2 TD, INT
- CCU – Bryan Carpenter – 10/11, 114 yards, TD

Top rushers

- TXST – Robert Brown Jr. – 6 carries, 24 yards
- CCU – CJ Marable – 25 carries, 121 yards, TD

Top receivers

- TXST – Mason Hays – 5 receptions, 117 yards, TD
- CCU – Isaiah Likely – 6 receptions, 107 yards, TD

Statistics	Texas State	Coastal Carolina
First downs	17	22
Total yards	329	380
Rushing yards	36	223
Passing yards	293	157
Turnovers	1	0
Time of possession	19:36	40:24

== Personnel ==
=== Coaching staff ===
Name	Position
Jamey Chadwell	Head coach
Patrick Covington	Assistant head coach / Offensive line
Chad Staggs	Defensive coordinator / Linebackers
Newland Isaac	Co-offensive coordinator / Running backs
Willy Korn	Co-offensive coordinator / Quarterbacks
Curt Baldus	Special teams
Bill Durkin	Tight ends, Offensive tackles
Bryant Foster	Defensive backs
T.J. Hollowell	Defensive ends, Outside linebackers
Joey King	Wide receivers
Skylor Magee	Defensive line
