= 2020 LendingTree Bowl (January) =

Postseason college football bowl game

- 21st LendingTree Bowl
Louisiana Ragin' Cajuns	Miami RedHawks
(10–3)	(8–5)
Sun Belt	MAC
27	17
Head coach: Billy Napier	Head coach: Chuck Martin
	1	2	3	4	Total
Louisiana	0	10	14	3	27
Miami	0	7	3	7	17
- Date: January 6, 2020
- Season: 2019
- Stadium: Ladd–Peebles Stadium
- Location: Mobile, Alabama
- MVP: Levi Lewis (QB, Louisiana)
- Favorite: Louisiana by 15
- Referee: Mike Roche (AAC)
- Attendance: 29,212
- Payout: US$1,500,000

United States TV coverage
- Network: ESPN
- Announcers: Dave LaMont (play-by-play), Gene Chizik (analyst) and Lauren Sisler (sideline)

The 2020 LendingTree Bowl was a college football bowl game played on January 6, 2020, with kickoff at 7:30 p.m. EST (6:30 p.m. local CST) on ESPN. It was the 21st edition of the LendingTree Bowl, (Note: The bowl has undergone various name changes during its history, with the prior three editions being contested as the Dollar General Bowl. Sponsorship by LendingTree was announced in November 2019.) and was the last of the 2019–20 bowl games concluding the 2019 FBS football season, with only the National Championship and all-star games to follow. The game's title sponsor was online lending marketplace LendingTree.

== Teams ==
The game matched the Mid-American Conference (MAC) champions Miami RedHawks and the Louisiana Ragin' Cajuns from the Sun Belt Conference. This was the third meeting between the two programs; the RedHawks had won both of the prior meetings.

=== Miami RedHawks ===
Miami entered the game with an 8–5 record (6–2 in conference). They finished atop the MAC's East Division, then won the MAC Championship Game over Central Michigan, 26–21. The RedHawks lost to both ranked opponents they faced, Iowa and Ohio State. After starting their season 2–4, Miami had a five-game winning streak before losing to Ball State in their regular season finale.

This was Miami's third LendingTree Bowl. The RedHawks had won both of their previous appearances; the 2003 GMAC Bowl (over Louisville) and the 2011 GoDaddy.com Bowl (over Middle Tennessee), when the bowl operated under different names.

=== Louisiana Ragin' Cajuns ===
Louisiana entered the game with a 10–3 record (7–1 in conference). The finished atop the West Division of the Sun Belt, then lost the Sun Belt Championship Game to Appalachian State, 45–38. Along with a regular season loss to Appalachian State, the only other team to defeat the Ragin' Cajuns was Mississippi State. This was the first LendingTree Bowl appearance for Louisiana.

This was Louisiana's seventh bowl game in program history; in their prior six bowls, they had an official record of 2–2, as two other bowl wins were later vacated. The Cajuns won four consecutive New Orleans Bowls under head coach Mark Hudspeth. In the 2011 edition, the 8–4 Cajuns beat San Diego State, 32–30, on a game-winning field goal. In the 2012 edition, the 8–4 Cajuns defeated East Carolina, 43–34. In the 2013 edition, the 8–4 Cajuns defeated the hometown Tulane Green Wave, 24–21. In the 2014 edition, the 8–4 Cajuns defeated Nevada, 16–3. Subsequently, the Cajuns had to the vacate their 2011 and 2013 wins, due to NCAA violations. The team returned to play in the 2016 New Orleans Bowl, with the 6–6 Cajuns losing to Southern Miss, 21–28, one of the closest games in rivalry history. In 2018, the Cajuns hired a new head coach, Billy Napier, who led the 7–6 Cajuns to the Sun Belt West Divisional Championship and the 2018 Cure Bowl, losing to Tulane, 24–41.

== Game summary ==
2020 LendingTree Bowl

Quarter	1	2	3	4	Total
Louisiana	0	10	14	3	27
Miami	0	7	3	7	17

at Ladd–Peebles Stadium • Mobile, Alabama

- Date: Monday, January 6, 2020
- Game time: 7:30 p.m. EST (6:30 p.m. CST)
- Game weather: Clear • Temperature: 58 °F (14 °C) • Wind: SW 6 miles per hour (9.7 km/h)
- Game attendance: 29,212
- Referee: Mike Roche
- TV announcers (ESPN): Dave LaMont (play-by-play), Gene Chizik (analyst) and Lauren Sisler (sideline)
- ESPN game summary

Game information

First Quarter
No scoring
Second Quarter

- (10:25) MIA – Jaylon Bester 5 yard rush, Sam Sloman kick (Drive: 10 plays, 66 yards, 4:36; Miami 7–0)
- (6:32) LA – Stevie Artigue 33 yard field goal (Drive: 10 plays, 59 yards, 3:53; Miami 7–3)
- (1:05) LA – Elijah Mitchell 2 yard rush, Stevie Artigue kick (Drive: 7 plays, 57 yards, 3:02; Louisiana 10–7)

Third Quarter

- (10:51) LA – Levi Lewis 9 yard pass to Ja'Marcus Bradley, Stevie Artigue kick (Drive: 9 plays, 70 yards, 4:09; Louisiana 17–7)
- (5:18) MIA – Sam Sloman 39 yard field goal (Drive: 11 plays, 58 yards, 5:33; Louisiana 17–10)
- (2:26) LA – Levi Lewis 12 yard pass to Ja'Mar Bradley, Stevie Artigue kick (Drive: 9 plays, 79 yards, 2:52; Louisiana 24–10)

Fourth Quarter

- (11:35) MIA – Jaylon Bester 1 yard rush, Sam Sloman kick (Drive: 14 plays, 77 yards, 5:51; Louisiana 24–17)
- (4:35) LA – Stevie Artigue 38 yard field goal (Drive: 6 plays, 27 yards, 2:50; Louisiana 27–17)

This was the first bowl win for the Louisiana Ragin' Cajuns program outside the state of Louisiana since 1944, when the team was known as Southwestern Louisiana and they won the Oil Bowl in Houston. In additional to Louisiana quarterback Levi Lewis being named the game's overall MVP, wide receiver Ja’Marcus Bradley, defensive back Eric Garror, and placekicker Stevie Artigue were recognized as offensive, defensive, and special teams MVPs, respectively.

=== Statistics ===
Statistics	LA	MIA
First downs	18	22
Total yards	401	351
Rushes–yards	34–155	37–103
Passing yards	246	248
Passing: Comp–Att–Int	19–26–0	22–31–0
Time of possession	28:17	31:43

Team	Category	Player	Statistics
Louisiana	Passing	Levi Lewis	19/26, 246, 2 TD
Louisiana	Rushing	Levi Lewis	8 carries, 62 yards
Louisiana	Receiving	Ja'Marcus Bradley	7 receptions, 88 yards
Miami	Passing	Brett Gabbert	22/31, 248 yards
Miami	Rushing	Tyre Shelton	6 carries, 59 yards
Miami	Receiving	Jack Sorenson	10 receptions, 107 yards
