= 2019 Arkansas State Red Wolves football team =

American college football season

2019 Arkansas State Red Wolves football

Camellia Bowl champion

Camellia Bowl, W 34–26 vs. FIU
- Conference: Sun Belt Conference
- West Division
- Record: 8–5 (5–3 Sun Belt)
- Head coach: Blake Anderson (6th season)
- Offensive coordinator: Keith Heckendorf (1st season)
- Offensive scheme: Spread
- Defensive coordinator: David Duggan (1st season)
- Base defense: 4–3
- Home stadium: Centennial Bank Stadium

2019 Sun Belt Conference football standings
	Conf.			Overall
Team	W		L	W		L
East Division
No. 19 Appalachian State x$	7	–	1	13	–	1
Georgia Southern	5	–	3	7	–	6
Georgia State	4	–	4	7	–	6
Troy	3	–	5	5	–	7
Coastal Carolina	2	–	6	5	–	7
West Division
Louisiana x	7	–	1	11	–	3
Arkansas State	5	–	3	8	–	5
Louisiana–Monroe	4	–	4	5	–	7
Texas State	2	–	6	3	–	9
South Alabama	1	–	7	2	–	10
Championship: Appalachian State 45, Louisiana 38
$ – Conference champion; x – Division champion/co-champions; Rankings from AP Poll

The 2019 Arkansas State Red Wolves football team represented Arkansas State University in the 2019 NCAA Division I FBS football season. The Red Wolves played their home games at Centennial Bank Stadium in Jonesboro, Arkansas, and competed in the West Division of the Sun Belt Conference. They were led by sixth-year head coach Blake Anderson.

== Schedule ==
Arkansas State announced its 2019 football schedule on March 1, 2019. The 2019 schedule consisted of six home and six away games in the regular season.

Date	Time	Opponent	Site	TV	Result	Attendance
August 31	6:00 p.m.	SMU*	Centennial Bank Stadium; Jonesboro, AR	ESPN+	L 30–37	22,076
September 7	9:00 p.m.	at UNLV*	Sam Boyd Stadium; Whitney, NV	Stadium Facebook	W 43–17	18,742
September 14	11:00 a.m.	at No. 3 Georgia*	Sanford Stadium; Athens, GA	ESPN2	L 0–55	92,746
September 21	6:00 p.m.	Southern Illinois*	Centennial Bank Stadium; Jonesboro, AR	ESPN3	W 41–28	24,176
September 28	5:00 p.m.	at Troy	Veterans Memorial Stadium; Troy, AL	ESPN+	W 50–43	26,437
October 5	3:30 p.m.	at Georgia State	Georgia State Stadium; Atlanta, GA	ESPN+	L 38–52	16,109
October 17	6:30 p.m.	Louisiana	Centennial Bank Stadium; Jonesboro, AR	ESPNU	L 20–37	19,176
October 26	6:00 p.m.	Texas State^{†}	Centennial Bank Stadium; Jonesboro, AR	ESPN+	W 38–14	21,343
November 2	2:30 p.m.	at Louisiana–Monroe	Malone Stadium; Monroe, LA	ESPNU	W 48–41	15,327
November 16	2:00 p.m.	Coastal Carolina	Centennial Bank Stadium; Jonesboro, AR	ESPN+	W 28–27	18,927
November 23	2:00 p.m.	Georgia Southern	Centennial Bank Stadium; Jonesboro, AR	ESPN+	W 38–33	18,319
November 29	4:00 p.m.	at South Alabama	Ladd–Peebles Stadium; Mobile, AL	ESPN+	L 30–34	16,319
December 21	4:30 p.m.	vs. FIU*	Cramton Bowl; Montgomery, AL (Camellia Bowl)	ESPN	W 34–26	16,209
*Non-conference game; ^{†}Homecoming; Rankings from AP Poll and CFP Rankings after November 5 released prior to game; All times are in Central time

== Game summaries ==
=== SMU ===
Southern Methodist at Arkansas State – Game summary

Quarter	1	2	3	4	Total
Mustangs	3	13	14	7	37
Red Wolves	7	2	14	7	30

at Centennial Bank Stadium, Jonesboro, AR

- Date: August 31
- Game time: 6:00 p.m. CDT
- Game weather: 88 °F (31 °C); mostly sunny
- Game attendance: 22,076
- Referee: Jason Autrey
- TV: ESPN+

Game information

First quarter

- (13:08) ARST TD – Omar Bayless 7-yard pass from Logan Bonner, Blake Grupe kick
  Arkansas State 7–0; Drive: 1 play, 7 yards, 0:04
- (08:45) SMU FG – Kevin Robledo 34-yard field goal
  Arkansas State 7–3; Drive: 14 plays, 53 yards, 4:17

Second quarter

- (14:01) ARST SF – Team safety
  Arkansas State 9–3; Drive: 2 plays, -12 yards, 0:36
- (07:08) SMU TD – Xavier Jones 9-yard rush, Kevin Robledo kick
  Southern Methodist 10–9; Drive: 13 plays, 92 yards, 5:03
- (03:53) SMU FG – Kevin Robledo 29-yard field goal
  Southern Methodist 13–9; Drive: 7 plays, 27 yards, 2:29
- (00:29) SMU FG – Kevin Robledo 25-yard field goal
  Southern Methodist 16–9; Drive: 10 plays, 47 yards, 1:55

Third quarter

- (13:41) ARST TD – Omar Bayless 8-yard pass from Logan Bonner, Blake Grupe kick
  Tied 16–16; Drive: 6 plays, 69 yards, 1:11
- (07:36) ARST TD – Omar Bayless 29-yard pass from Logan Bonner, Blake Grupe kick
  Arkansas State 23–16; Drive: 7 plays, 98 yards, 3:03
- (07:22) SMU TD – CJ Sanders 98-yard kickoff returned, Kevin Robledo PAT failed
  Arkansas State 23–22; Drive: 0 plays, 0 yards, 0:00
- (00:44) SMU TD – Xavier Jones 1-yard rush, Tyler Page two point conversion pass to Kylen Granson
  Southern Methodist 30–23; Drive: 9 plays, 51 yards, 3:36

Fourth quarter

- (09:11) SMU TD – Xavier Jones 2-yard rush, Kevin Robledo kick
  Southern Methodist 37–23; Drive: 11 plays, 89 yards, 4:55
- (05:59) ARST TD – Omar Bayless 34-yard pass from Logan Bonner, Blake Grupe kick
  Southern Methodist 37–30; Drive: 11 plays, 75 yards, 3:12

Top passers

- SMU – Shane Buechele – 30/49, 360 yards, INT
- ARST – Logan Bonner – 32/50, 324 yards, 4 TD, INT

Top rushers

- SMU – Ke'Mon Freeman – 22 carries, 86 yards
- ARST – Marcel Murray – 17 carries, 77 yards

Top receivers

- SMU – Reggie Roberson Jr. – 11 receptions, 180 yards
- ARST – Omar Bayless – 10 receptions, 132 yards, 4 TD

Statistics	SMU	Arkansas State
First downs	29	25
Total yards	508	414
Rushing yards	148	90
Passing yards	360	324
Turnovers	1	3
Time of possession	35:14	24:46

=== At UNLV ===
	1	2	3	4	Total
Red Wolves	10	13	10	10	43
Rebels	0	3	7	7	17

=== At No. 3 Georgia ===
Week 3: Arkansas State Red Wolves at No. 3 Georgia Bulldogs

Quarter	1	2	3	4	Total
Arkansas State	0	0	0	0	0
No. 3 Georgia	13	21	14	7	55

at Sanford Stadium, Athens, Georgia

- Date: September 14, 2019
- Game time: 12:00 p.m.
- Game attendance: 92,746
- TV announcers (ESPN2): Roy Philpott, Kelly Stouffer and Lauren Sisler
- Recap, Box Score

Game information

First quarter

- UGA – Brian Herrien 3-yard run (Rodrigo Blankenship kick), 9:02. #3 Georgia 7–0. Drive: 6 plays, 60 yards, 2:52.
- UGA – Rodrigo Blankenship 29-yard field goal, 5:28. #3 Georgia 10–0. Drive: 5 plays, 41 yards, 2:17.
- UGA – Rodrigo Blankenship 41-yard field goal, 1:08. #3 Georgia 13–0. Drive: 8 plays, 41 yards, 2:41.

Second quarter

- UGA – Dominick Blaylock 60-yard pass from Jake Fromm (Rodrigo Blankenship kick), 14:47. #3 Georgia 20–0. Drive: 3 plays, 68 yards, 0:52.
- UGA – D'Andre Swift 48-yard pass from Jake Fromm (Rodrigo Blankenship kick), 10:21. #3 Georgia 27–0. Drive: 5 plays, 89 yards, 2:14.
- UGA – Lawrence Cager 5-yard pass from Jake Fromm (Rodrigo Blankenship kick), 0:54. #3 Georgia 34–0. Drive: 7 plays, 66 yards, 1:37.

Third quarter

- UGA – James Cook 37-yard run (Rodrigo Blankenship kick), 12:02. #3 Georgia 41–0. Drive: 7 plays, 65 yards, 2:58.
- UGA – Zamir White 1-yard run (Rodrigo Blankenship kick), 4:20. #3 Georgia 48–0. Drive: 9 plays, 83 yards, 5:01.

Fourth quarter

- UGA – Kenny McIntosh 62-yard run (Rodrigo Blankenship kick), 9:07. #3 Georgia 55–0. Drive: 6 plays, 98 yards, 2:43.

Top passers

- ARST – Logan Bonner – 20/35, 124 yards
- UGA – Jake Fromm – 17/22, 279 yards, 3 TD

Top rushers

- ARST – DJ Chatman – 7 rushes, 24 yards
- UGA – D'Andre Swift – 9 rushes, 76 yards

Top receivers

- ARST – Jonathan Adams Jr – 7 receptions, 85 yards
- UGA – Dominick Blaylock – 4 receptions, 112 yards, TD

=== Southern Illinois ===
	1	2	3	4	Total
Salukis	14	0	14	0	28
Red Wolves	14	17	7	3	41

=== At Troy ===
	1	2	3	4	Total
Red Wolves	21	10	14	5	50
Trojans	10	21	6	6	43

=== At Georgia State ===
	1	2	3	4	Total
Red Wolves	0	21	7	10	38
Panthers	7	24	7	14	52

=== Louisiana ===
Louisiana at Arkansas State

Team	1	2	3	4	Total
• Ragin' Cajuns	7	17	0	13	37
Red Wolves	7	3	3	7	20

- Date: October 17, 2019
- Location: Centennial Bank Stadium
  Jonesboro, AR
- Game start: 6:32 p.m. CDT
- Elapsed time: 3 hours and 21 minutes
- Game attendance: 19,176
- Game weather: 60 °F (16 °C) • Weather: Fair • Wind: 3 SSE MPH
- Referee: Wayne Winkler
- Television network: ESPNU

Scoring summary
1	10:13	ARST	Brandon Bowling 10–yard pass from Layne Hatcher (Blake Grupe kick) (12 plays, 95 yards, 4:47)	ARST 7–0
1	00:11	LA	Trey Ragas 1–yard rush (Stevie Artigue kick) (9 plays, 74 yards, 3:13)	TIE 7–7
2	09:00	ARST	Blake Grupe 25–yard field goal (16 plays, 71 yards, 3:43)	ARST 10–7
2	05:12	LA	Elijah Mitchell 11–yard rush (Stevie Artigue kick) (9 plays, 74 yards, 3:43)	LA 14–10
2	02:35	LA	Raymond Calais 80–yard rush (Stevie Artigue kick) (1 play, 80 yards, 0:11)	LA 21–10
2	00:06	LA	Stevie Artigue 25–yard field goal (12 plays, 56 yards, 1:33)	LA 24–10
3	04:29	ARST	Blake Grupe 46–yard field goal (9 plays, 42 yards, 3:32)	LA 24–13
4	11:35	ARST	Kirk Merritt 25–yard pass from Layne Hatcher (Blake Grupe kick) (11 plays, 86 yards, 4:18)	LA 24–20
4	06:19	LA	Elijah Mitchell 1–yard rush (Stevie Artigue kick failed) (12 plays, 52 yards, 5:08)	LA 30–20
4	03:18	LA	Raymond Calais 38–yard rush (Stevie Artigue kick) (2 plays, 41 yards, 0:14)	LA 37–20

Statistics	Louisiana	Arkansas State
First downs	26	27
Total yards	496	473
Rushing yards	315	170
Passing yards	181	303
Turnovers	1	1
Time of possession	26:50	33:10

Team	Category	Player	Statistics
Louisiana	Passing	Levi Lewis	17–24, 181 yards, 1 INT
Louisiana	Rushing	Raymond Calais	8 carries, 144 yards, 2 TDs
Louisiana	Receiving	Ja'Marcus Bradley	6 receptions, 72 yards
Arkansas State	Passing	Layne Hatcher	23–34, 303 yards, 2 TDs, 1 INT
Arkansas State	Rushing	Marcel Murray	35 carries, 164 yards
Arkansas State	Receiving	Omar Bayless	9 receptions, 150 yards

=== Texas State ===
Week Eight: Texas State Bobcats at Arkansas State Red Wolves – Game summary

Quarter	1	2	3	4	Total
Bobcats	0	14	0	0	14
Red Wolves	7	10	14	7	38

at Centennial Bank Stadium, Jonesboro, AR

- Date: October 26
- Game time: 6:00 p.m. CDT
- Game weather: 55 °F (13 °C); overcast
- Game attendance: 21,343
- Referee: Marshall Lewis
- TV: ESPN+

Game information

First quarter

- (05:01) ARST TD – Omar Bayless 13-yard pass from Layne Hatcher, Blake Grupe kick
  Arkansas State 7–0; Drive: 18 plays, 99 yards, 7:22

Second quarter

- (14:53) ARST FG – Blake Grupe 20-yard field goal
  Arkansas State 10–0; Drive: 4 plays, -1 yards, 0:52
- (09:22) ARST TD – Jamal Jones 7-yard rush, Blake Grupe kick
  Arkansas State 17–0; Drive: 8 plays, 64 yards, 3:18
- (07:06) TXST TD – Caleb Twyford 2-yard rush, Joshua Rowland kick
  Arkansas State 17–7; Drive: 7 plays, 65 yards, 2:16
- (01:58) TXST TD – Hutch White 6-yard pass from Tyler Vitt, Joshua Rowland kick
  Arkansas State 17–14; Drive: 7 plays, 64 yards, 2:10

Third quarter

- (10:31) ARST TD – Marcel Murray 13-yard rush, Blake Grupe kick
  Arkansas State 24–14; Drive: 1 play, 13 yards, 0:07
- (04:19) ARST TD – Marcel Murray 16-yard rush, Blake Grupe kick
  Arkansas State 31–14; Drive: 1 play, 16 yards, 0:09

Fourth quarter

- (09:48) ARST TD – Omar Bayless 2-yard pass from Layne Hatcher, Blake Grupe kick
  Arkansas State 38–14; Drive: 13 plays, 66 yards, 6:03

Top passers

- TXST – Tyler Vitt – 15/27, 146 yards, TD, 2 INT
- ARST – Layne Hatcher – 18/28, 158 yards, 2 TD

Top rushers

- TXST – Caleb Twyford – 16 carries, 76 yards, TD
- ARST – Marcel Murray – 22 carries, 114 yards, 2 TD

Top receivers

- TXST – Jeremiah Haydel – 3 receptions, 56 yards
- ARST – Omar Bayless – 7 receptions, 77 yards, 2 TD

Statistics	Texas State	Arkansas State
First downs	8	21
Total yards	227	364
Rushing yards	81	206
Passing yards	146	158
Turnovers	3	0
Time of possession	22:40	37:20

=== At Louisiana–Monroe ===
Week Nine: Arkansas State Red Wolves at Louisiana–Monroe Warhawks – Game summary

Quarter	1	2	3	4	Total
Red Wolves	3	28	3	14	48
Warhawks	14	14	6	7	41

at Malone Stadium • Monroe, LA

- Date: November 2
- Game time: 4:00 p.m. CDT
- Game weather: 64° · Wind – NW 11 · Clear/Sunny
- Game attendance: 15,327
- Referee: Jason Autrey
- TV: ESPNU

Game information

First quarter

- (13:58) ULM TD – Caleb Evans 67-yard rush, Jared Porter kick
  Louisiana–Monroe 7–0; Drive: 3 plays, 75 yards, 1:02
- (06:56) ULM TD – Josh Johnson 6-yard rush, Jared Porter kick
  Louisiana–Monroe 14–0; Drive: 1 play, 6 yards, 0:06
- (00:41) ARST FG – Blake Grupe 43-yard field goal
  Louisiana–Monroe 14–3; Drive: 8 plays, 54 yards, 2:27

Second quarter

- (14:18) ULM TD – Markis McCray 34-yard pass from Caleb Evans, Jared Porter kick
  Louisiana–Monroe 21–3; Drive: 4 plays, 75 yards, 1:23
- (13:50) ARST TD – Marcel Murray 57-yard rush, Blake Grupe kick
  Louisiana–Monroe 21–10; Drive: 2 plays, 75 yards, 0:28
- (07:28) ARST TD – Omar Bayless 46-yard pass from Layne Hatcher, Blake Grupe kick
  Louisiana–Monroe 21–17; Drive: 7 plays, 78 yards, 2:31
- (07:09) ARST TD – Marcel Murray 35-yard rush, Jared Porter kick
  Arkansas State 24–21; Drive: 1 play, 35 yards, 0:17
- (01:27) ARST TD – Kirk Merritt 23-yard pass from Layne Hatcher, Blake Grupe kick
  Arkansas State 31–21; Drive: 4 plays, 47 yards, 1:15
- (00:03) ULM TD – Caleb Evans 16-yard rush, Jared Porter kick
  Arkansas State 31–28; Drive: 9 plays, 65 yards, 1:24

Third quarter

- (09:29) ARST FG – Blake Grupe 31-yard field goal
  Arkansas State 34–28; Drive: 12 plays, 61 yards, 5:31
- (04:20) ULM TD – Caleb Evans 23-yard rush, Jared Porter PAT failed
  Tied 34–34; Drive: 5 plays, 42 yards, 1:56

Fourth quarter

- (12:58) ARST TD – Marcel Murray 6-yard rush, Blake Grupe kick
  Arkansas State 41–34; Drive: 6 plays, 36 yards, 2:02
- (07:26) ARST TD – Jamal Jones 8-yard rush, Blake Grupe kick
  Arkansas State 48–34; Drive: 7 plays, 73 yards, 3:39
- (02:21) ULM TD – Josh Pederson 11-yard pass from Caleb Evans, Jared Porter kick
  Arkansas State 48–41; Drive: 14 plays, 80 yards, 2:37

Leading Passers

- ARST – Layne Hatcher – 21/28, 307 yards, 2 TD, INT
- ULM – Caleb Evans – 24/37, 215 yards, 2 TD

Leading Rushers

- ARST – Marcel Murray – 24 carries, 175 yards, 3 TD
- ULM – Caleb Evans – 12 carries, 148 yards, 3 TD

Leading Receivers

- ARST – Omar Bayless – 6 receptions, 98 yards, TD
- ULM – Jonathan Hodoh – 6 receptions, 65 yards

Statistics	Arkansas State	Louisiana–Monroe
First downs	21	21
Total yards	514	448
Rushing yards	207	233
Passing yards	307	215
Turnovers	2	1
Time of possession	31:54	28:06

=== Coastal Carolina ===
	1	2	3	4	Total
Chanticleers	3	10	0	14	27
Red Wolves	7	0	14	7	28

=== Georgia Southern ===
	1	2	3	4	Total
Eagles	3	16	8	6	33
Red Wolves	14	21	3	0	38

=== At South Alabama ===
	1	2	3	4	Total
Red Wolves	7	0	10	13	30
Jaguars	14	0	6	14	34

=== Vs. FIU (Camellia Bowl) ===
	1	2	3	4	Total
Panthers	0	13	10	3	26
Red Wolves	14	6	7	7	34
