= 2019 Louisiana Ragin' Cajuns football team =

American college football season

2019 Louisiana Ragin' Cajuns football

Sun Belt West Division champion LendingTree Bowl champion

Sun Belt Championship Game, L 38–45 at Appalachian State

LendingTree Bowl, W 27–17 vs. Miami (OH)
- Conference: Sun Belt Conference
- West Division
- Record: 11–3 (7–1 Sun Belt)
- Head coach: Billy Napier (2nd season)
- Offensive coordinator: Rob Sale (2nd season)
- Offensive scheme: Pro-style
- Defensive coordinator: Ron Roberts (2nd season)
- Base defense: Multiple
- Home stadium: Cajun Field

2019 Sun Belt Conference football standings
	Conf.			Overall
Team	W		L	W		L
East Division
No. 19 Appalachian State x$	7	–	1	13	–	1
Georgia Southern	5	–	3	7	–	6
Georgia State	4	–	4	7	–	6
Troy	3	–	5	5	–	7
Coastal Carolina	2	–	6	5	–	7
West Division
Louisiana x	7	–	1	11	–	3
Arkansas State	5	–	3	8	–	5
Louisiana–Monroe	4	–	4	5	–	7
Texas State	2	–	6	3	–	9
South Alabama	1	–	7	2	–	10
Championship: Appalachian State 45, Louisiana 38
$ – Conference champion; x – Division champion/co-champions; Rankings from AP Poll

The 2019 Louisiana Ragin' Cajuns football team represented the University of Louisiana at Lafayette in the 2019 NCAA Division I FBS football season. The Ragin' Cajuns played their home games at Cajun Field in Lafayette, Louisiana, and competed in the West Division of the Sun Belt Conference. They were led by second-year head coach Billy Napier. The Cajuns made it to the Sun Belt Conference Championship Game for the second consecutive year by winning the West Division, ultimately losing to Appalachian State by the score of 45–38. The Cajuns then defeated Miami (OH) in the LendingTree Bowl, to end the season with an overall record of 11–3. Following the season, head coach Billy Napier's contract was extended by two years, going into the 2025 season.

== Preseason ==
=== Recruiting class ===
College recruiting
Name	Hometown	School	Height	Weight	40^{‡}	Commit date
Cassius Allen; WR	Pelham, Georgia	Pelham H.S. Northeastern Oklahoma A&M College	6 ft 4 in (1.93 m)	210 lb (95 kg)	-	Jun 19, 2019
Cassius Allen; WR	Recruit ratings: No ratings found					
Schdarren Archie; S	Brandon, Mississippi	Brandon H.S. Mississippi Gulf Coast C.C.	6 ft 2 in (1.88 m)	198 lb (90 kg)	-	Jan 19, 2019
Schdarren Archie; S	Recruit ratings: 247Sports:					
Jacob Bernard; WR	Mandeville, Louisiana	Lakeshore H.S.	5 ft 10 in (1.78 m)	193 lb (88 kg)	-	Feb 6, 2019
Jacob Bernard; WR	Recruit ratings: 247Sports:					
Tyler Brown; OL	Madison, Mississippi	St. Joseph Catholic H.S.	6 ft 3 in (1.91 m)	303 lb (137 kg)	-	Feb 6, 2019
Tyler Brown; OL	Recruit ratings: 247Sports:					
Dalen Cambre; WR	Lafayette, Louisiana	St. Thomas More Catholic H.S.	6 ft 0 in (1.83 m)	192 lb (87 kg)	-	Feb 5, 2019
Dalen Cambre; WR	Recruit ratings: No ratings found					
Quintlan Cobb; DL	Kaplan, Louisiana	Kaplan H.S.	6 ft 5 in (1.96 m)	314 lb (142 kg)	-	Feb 6, 2019
Quintlan Cobb; DL	Recruit ratings: 247Sports:					
Chandler Fields; QB	Metairie, Louisiana	Archbishop Rummel H.S.	5 ft 11 in (1.80 m)	185 lb (84 kg)	-	Feb 6, 2019
Chandler Fields; QB	Recruit ratings: 247Sports:					
La'Kamion Franklin; OLB	Monroe, Louisiana	Neville H.S.	6 ft 1 in (1.85 m)	213 lb (97 kg)	-	Feb 6, 2019
La'Kamion Franklin; OLB	Recruit ratings: 247Sports:					
A.J. Gillie; OL	Natchitoches, Louisiana	Natchitoches Central H.S.	6 ft 3 in (1.91 m)	310 lb (140 kg)	-	Feb 6, 2019
A.J. Gillie; OL	Recruit ratings: 247Sports:					
Andrew Gleason; OLB	West Monroe, Louisiana	West Monroe H.S.	6 ft 3 in (1.91 m)	243 lb (110 kg)	-	Feb 6, 2019
Andrew Gleason; OLB	Recruit ratings: No ratings found					
Tyler Guidry; LB	Baton Rouge, Louisiana	Southern U Lab	6 ft 2 in (1.88 m)	222 lb (101 kg)	-	Feb 6, 2019
Tyler Guidry; LB	Recruit ratings: 247Sports:					
Jax Harrington; OL	Erath, Louisiana	Erath H.S.	6 ft 4 in (1.93 m)	305 lb (138 kg)	-	Feb 6, 2019
Jax Harrington; OL	Recruit ratings: 247Sports:					
Shomari Hayes; DT	Phoenix, Arizona	Mountain Pointe H.S.	6 ft 2 in (1.88 m)	294 lb (133 kg)	-	Feb 6, 2019
Shomari Hayes; DT	Recruit ratings: 247Sports:					
Jaden Henderson; DB	New Orleans, Louisiana	McDonogh 35 H.S.	6 ft 0 in (1.83 m)	193 lb (88 kg)	-	Feb 6, 2019
Jaden Henderson; DB	Recruit ratings: 247Sports:					
Bobby Holmes; DB	Dallas, Texas	South Oak Cliff H.S.	5 ft 10 in (1.78 m)	165 lb (75 kg)	-	Feb 6, 2019
Bobby Holmes; DB	Recruit ratings: 247Sports:					
Dalvin Hutchinson; DL	West Monroe, Louisiana	West Monroe H.S.	6 ft 1 in (1.85 m)	317 lb (144 kg)	-	Feb 6, 2019
Dalvin Hutchinson; DL	Recruit ratings: 247Sports:					
Neal Johnson; TE	Mesquite, Texas	West Mesquite H.S.	6 ft 4 in (1.93 m)	223 lb (101 kg)	-	Feb 6, 2019
Neal Johnson; TE	Recruit ratings: 247Sports:					
Peter LeBlanc; WR	New Iberia, Louisiana	Catholic-New Iberia H.S.	6 ft 2 in (1.88 m)	182 lb (83 kg)	-	Feb 6, 2019
Peter LeBlanc; WR	Recruit ratings: 247Sports:					
Brandon Legendre; WR	Thibodeaux, Louisiana	E.D. White Catholic H.S.	5 ft 9 in (1.75 m)	181 lb (82 kg)	-	Feb 6, 2019
Brandon Legendre; WR	Recruit ratings: 247Sports:					
Jai'Ave Magalei; QB	Tacoma, Washington	Lakes H.S. Mt. San Antonio College	6 ft 3 in (1.91 m)	234 lb (106 kg)	-	Feb 6, 2019
Jai'Ave Magalei; QB	Recruit ratings: 247Sports:					
Amir McDaniel; CB	Pensacola, Florida	West Florida Tech	5 ft 9 in (1.75 m)	167 lb (76 kg)	-	Feb 6, 2019
Amir McDaniel; CB	Recruit ratings: 247Sports:					
Clifton McDowell; QB	Spring, Texas	Spring H.S.	6 ft 3 in (1.91 m)	200 lb (91 kg)	-	Feb 6, 2019
Clifton McDowell; QB	Recruit ratings: 247Sports:					
King McGowen; OT	Willis, Texas	Willis H.S.	6 ft 5 in (1.96 m)	271 lb (123 kg)	-	Feb 4, 2019
King McGowen; OT	Recruit ratings: 247Sports:					
Ja-Quane Nelson; DL	High Point, North Carolina	High Point Central H.S. Hutchinson C.C.	6 ft 3 in (1.91 m)	280 lb (130 kg)	-	Feb 6, 2019
Ja-Quane Nelson; DL	Recruit ratings: 247Sports:					
Logan Newell; OL	Monroe, Louisiana	Neville H.S.	6 ft 5 in (1.96 m)	281 lb (127 kg)	-	Feb 6, 2019
Logan Newell; OL	Recruit ratings: 247Sports:					
Grant Paulette; K	Hebron, Texas	Hebron H.S.	6 ft 1 in (1.85 m)	173 lb (78 kg)	-	Feb 6, 2019
Grant Paulette; K	Recruit ratings: No ratings found					
Brian Smith; WR	Lake Charles, Louisiana	Barbe H.S. Glendale C.C.	6 ft 4 in (1.93 m)	201 lb (91 kg)	-	Jun 18, 2018
Brian Smith; WR	Recruit ratings: 247Sports:					
Ja'Braylon Spencer; OLB	New Iberia, Louisiana	New Iberia H.S.	6 ft 3 in (1.91 m)	200 lb (91 kg)	-	Jul 29, 2018
Ja'Braylon Spencer; OLB	Recruit ratings: 247Sports:					
Nate Thomas; OL	Chalmette, Louisiana	Chalmette H.S.	6 ft 5 in (1.96 m)	258 lb (117 kg)	-	Feb 6, 2019
Nate Thomas; OL	Recruit ratings: 247Sports:					
O'Cyrus Torrence; OL	Greensburg, Louisiana	St. Helena Central H.S.	6 ft 5 in (1.96 m)	313 lb (142 kg)	-	Feb 6, 2019
O'Cyrus Torrence; OL	Recruit ratings: 247Sports:					
Kendall Wilkerson; DE	Kentwood, Louisiana	Kentwood H.S.	6 ft 5 in (1.96 m)	275 lb (125 kg)	-	Feb 6, 2019
Kendall Wilkerson; DE	Recruit ratings: 247Sports:					
Mekhi Williams-Garner; S	Mesquite, Texas	Poteet H.S. Navarro College	6 ft 1 in (1.85 m)	188 lb (85 kg)	-	Jun 18, 2019
Mekhi Williams-Garner; S	Recruit ratings: No ratings found					
Overall recruit ranking: 247Sports: 80
Note: In many cases, Scout, Rivals, 247Sports, On3, and ESPN may conflict in their listings of height and weight.; In these cases, the average was taken. ESPN grades are on a 100-point scale.; Sources: "2019 Team Ranking". Rivals.com.

=== Award watch lists ===
Listed in the order that they were released

Award	Player	Position	Year
Doak Walker Award	Elijah Mitchell	RB	JR
Doak Walker Award	Trey Ragas	RB	R-JR
Mackey Award	Johnny Lumpkin	TE	R-JR
Outland Trophy	Robert Hunt	OL	R-SR
Wuerffel Trophy	Deuce Wallace	DB	R-SR

=== Sun Belt coaches poll ===
The Sun Belt coaches poll was released on July 18, 2019. Louisiana was picked to finish first in the West Division with 46 total votes and picked to finish second in the conference with six first-place votes behind Appalachian State's seven.

=== Sun Belt Preseason All-Conference teams ===
Offense

1st team

- Ja'Marcus Bradley - R-SR, Wide Receiver
- Kevin Dotson – R-SR, Offensive Lineman
- Robert Hunt - R-SR, Offensive Lineman

2nd team

- Elijah Mitchell - JR, Running Back
- Trey Ragas – R-JR, Running Back

Defensive

2nd team

- Zi'Yon Hill - SO, Defensive Lineman
- Jacques Boudreaux - SR, Linebacker
- Michael Jacquet - R-SR, Defensive Back

== Roster ==
2019 Louisiana Ragin' Cajuns football team roster
Players
Coaches
Offense

Pos.	#	Name	Class
QB	1	Levi Lewis	Jr
WR	2	Ja'Marcus Bradley	Sr
RB	3	Ashton Johnson	Sr
RB	4	Raymond Calais	Sr
WR	6	Cassius Allen	Fr
WR	7	Brian Smith Jr.	Jr
QB	8	Jai'Ave Magalei	So
RB	9	Trey Ragas	Jr
QB	10	Clinton McDowell	Fr
WR	11	Calif Gossett	Jr
QB	13	Beau Kalbacher	Jr
WR	13	Brandon Legendre	Fr
RB	15	Elijah Mitchell	Jr
QB	16	Chandler Fields	Fr
QB	17	Brayden Hawkins	Fr
WR	18	Jalen Williams	Jr
WR	19	Jamal Bell	Jr
WR	20	Jarrod Jackson	Sr
RB	21	Chris Smith	Fr
TE	22	Nick Ralston	Sr
WR	26	Kaleb Carter	Fr
RB	27	T. J. Wisham	So
WR	28	Dalen Cambre	Fr
WR	29	Peter LeBlanc	Fr
WR	30	Devon Pauley	Fr
WR	33	Michael Orphey Jr.	Fr
RB	38	Brendon Hoorman	Fr
OL	50	Robert Hunt	Sr
OL	53	AJ Gillie	Fr
OL	58	O'Cyrus Torrence	Fr
OL	61	Cole Prudhomme	Sr
OL	62	Nate Thomas	Fr
OL	63	Spencer Gardner	So
OL	64	Shane Vallot	So
OL	65	Carlos Rubio	So
OL	66	Rico Robinson	Sr
OL	67	Ken Marks	Sr
OL	68	Tyler Brown	Fr
OL	70	Jax Harrington	Fr
OL	71	Akkai Ward	Jr
OL	72	Max Yarbrough	Fr
OL	73	David Hudson	So
OL	74	Max Mitchell	So
OL	75	Kevin Dotson	Sr
OL	76	Kendell Baker	Jr
OL	77	King McGowen	Fr
OL	78	Luke Junkunc	Fr
OL	79	Logan Newell	Fr
TE	80	Chase Rogers	So
WR	82	Da'Ron Williams	Jr
WR	83	Pat Hughes	So
WR	86	Jacob Bernard	Fr
TE	86	Pearse Migl	Fr
TE	87	Neal Johnson	Fr
TE	88	Johnny Lumpkin	Jr
TE	89	Hunter Bergeron	So

Defense

Pos.	#	Name	Class
LB	2	Lorenzo McCaskill	So
LB	3	Joe Dillon	Jr
DT	4	Zi'Yon Hill	So
LB	6	Kris Moncrief	So
LB	7	Ferrod Gardner	Jr
DL	8	Kendall Wilkerson	Fr
DB	9	Kamar Greenhouse	Sr
CB	10	Bobby Holmes	Fr
DB	11	Michael Jacquet	Sr
DB	13	Patrick Mensah	Fr
DE	15	Bennie Higgins	Sr
DB	16	Percy Butler	So
LB	17	Chauncey Manac	Jr
DB	18	Asjlin Washington	So
DB	19	Eric Garror	So
S	20	Mekhi Garner	So
CB	21	Amir McDaniel	Fr
DB	22	Daijuane Dorsey	Jr
DB	23	Schdarren Archie	So
LB	23	Kyle Pierre	So
DB	24	Bralen Trahan	So
DB	25	Deuce Wallace	Sr
DB	26	Blair Brooks	Jr
DB	27	Cameron Soloman	Jr
DB	28	Ja'Len Johnson	So
S	29	Jaden Henderson	Fr
DB	30	Brandon Bishop	Fr
DB	30	Tim Morgan	Fr
LB	31	Alonzo Brown	Sr
LB	33	Tyler Guidry	Fr
LB	34	Jordan Cordova	So
S	35	Brenndan Johnson	Jr
DB	36	Kam Pedescleaux	Fr
DB	37	Jude Joseph	Fr
LB	37	Ja'Braylon Spencer	Fr
DB	38	Terik Miller	Sr
LB	43	Jourdon Quibodeaux	So
LB	44	Tanner Wiggins	Jr
LB	46	Damani Burrell	Fr
LB	48	Troy Krutchen	So
LB	50	Andre Jones Jr.	So
LB	51	Ken Jones	So
LB	52	Cooper LeBlanc	Fr
LB	53	Chandler Wachholtz	Sr
DL	54	Sammy Ochoa	Fr
DL	55	Devin Mitchell	So
DE	56	Terrence Jones	Jr
LB	57	La'Kamion Franklin	Fr
LB	59	Jacques Boudreaux	Sr
DL	90	Timaje Porter	So
DL	91	Dominique Holden	So
DL	93	Masry Mapieu	So
DL	94	Dalvin Hutchinson	Fr
LB	95	Andre Riley	So
DE	96	Malcolm Rollins	So
DL	97	Andre Landry	So
DL	97	Ja'Quane Nelson	So
DL	98	Shomari Hayes	Fr
DL	99	Tayland Humphrey	Jr

Special teams

Pos.	#	Name	Class
P	35	Seth Kootsouradis	Jr
K	36	Stevie Artigue	Sr
K	39	Grant Paulette	Fr
K	45	Kenneth Almendares	Fr
P	47	Rhys Byrns	So
LS	49	Paul Boudreaux	So
LS	69	Cody Myers	So

Head coach

- Billy Napier (Furman)

Coordinators/assistant coaches

- Rob Sale (LSU)
  Offensive coordinator/OL
- Ron Roberts (UT Martin)
  Defensive coordinator
- Michael Desormeaux (Louisiana)
  Assistant head coach/TE
- Jabbar Juke (Southern)
  Assistant head coach/RB
- Tim Leger (McNeese State)
  Assistant head coach/WR/recruiting coordinator
- D. J. Looney (Mississippi State)
  Assistant head coach/Assistant OL
- Matt Powledge (Sam Houston State)
  Assistant head coach/OLB/Special Team coordinator
- Rory Segrest (Alabama)
  Assistant head coach/DL
- Patrick Toney (Southeastern Louisiana)
  Assistant head coach/S
- LaMar Morgan (Louisiana
  Assistant head coach/CB
- Troy Wingerter (Louisiana)
  Director of football operations
- Mark Hocke (LSU New Orleans)
  Director of strength and conditioning
- Darren Walker (Louisiana)
  Assistant Director of Athletics for Video Operations
- Jacob LaFrance
  Director of player personnel
- Joshua Thompson
  Director of Recruiting & Football Logistics
- Katie Turner
  Director of On-Campus Recruiting
- Ainslee Dyer
  Assistant Director of Recruiting & Football Logistics
- Courtnei Davis
  Administrative coordinator

Legend

- (C) Team captain
- (S) Suspended
- (I) Ineligible
- Injured
- Redshirt

Roster
Last update: August 11, 2019

== Schedule ==
The 2019 schedule consisted of 6 home and 6 away games in the regular season. The Ragin' Cajuns would travel to Sun Belt foes Arkansas State, Coastal Carolina, Georgia Southern, and South Alabama. The Cajuns would play host to Sun Belt foes Appalachian State, Louisiana-Monroe, Texas State, and Troy.

The Ragin' Cajuns would host two of the four non-conference opponents at Cajun Field, Liberty Flames, and Independent school in Division I FBS Football and the Texas Southern Tigers of the SWAC, would travel to Mid-American Conference (MAC) member Ohio, and would play host to the Mississippi State Bulldogs of the Southeastern Conference (SEC) at the Mercedes-Benz Superdome.

Date	Time	Opponent	Site	TV	Result	Attendance
August 31, 2019	11:00 a.m.	vs. Mississippi State*	Mercedes-Benz Superdome; New Orleans, LA	ESPNU	L 28–38	22,440
September 7	6:30 p.m.	Liberty*	Cajun Field; Lafayette, LA	ESPN+	W 35–14	16,231
September 14	7:30 p.m.	Texas Southern*	Cajun Field; Lafayette, LA	ESPN3	W 77–6	18,183
September 21	1:00 p.m.	at Ohio*	Peden Stadium; Athens, OH	ESPN+	W 45–25	17,416
September 28	5:00 p.m.	at Georgia Southern	Paulson Stadium; Statesboro, GA	ESPN+	W 37–24	19,220
October 9	7:00 p.m.	Appalachian State	Cajun Field; Lafayette, LA	ESPN2	L 7–17	21,012
October 17	6:30 p.m.	at Arkansas State	Centennial Bank Stadium; Jonesboro, AR	ESPNU	W 37–20	19,176
November 2	4:00 p.m.	Texas State^{†}	Cajun Field; Lafayette, LA	ESPN+	W 31–3	21,063
November 7	6:30 p.m.	at Coastal Carolina	Brooks Stadium; Conway, SC	ESPNU	W 48–7	14,857
November 16	4:00 p.m.	at South Alabama	Ladd–Peebles Stadium; Mobile, AL	ESPN+	W 37–27	16,748
November 23	4:00 p.m.	Troy	Cajun Field; Lafayette, LA	ESPN+	W 53–3	14,262
November 30	6:30 p.m.	Louisiana–Monroe	Cajun Field; Lafayette, LA (Battle on the Bayou)	ESPNU	W 31–30	14,227
December 7	11:00 a.m.	at No. 21 Appalachian State	Kidd Brewer Stadium; Boone, NC (Sun Belt Championship)	ESPN	L 38–45	18,868
January 6, 2020	6:30 p.m.	vs. Miami (OH)*	Ladd–Peebles Stadium; Mobile, AL (LendingTree Bowl)	ESPN	W 27–17	29,212
*Non-conference game; ^{†}Homecoming; Rankings from AP Poll and CFP Rankings after November 5 released prior to game; All times are in Central time

Schedule source:

== Game summaries ==
=== Mississippi State ===
Mississippi State at Louisiana

Team	1	2	3	4	Total
• Bulldogs	7	14	7	10	38
Ragin' Cajuns	7	7	0	14	28

- Date: August 31, 2019
- Location: Mercedes–Benz Superdome
  New Orleans, LA
- Game start: 11:00 a.m. CDT
- Elapsed time: 3 hours and 37 minutes
- Game attendance: 22,440
- Game weather: 86 °F (30 °C) • Weather: N/A (Indoors) • Wind: 6 NE MPH
- Referee: Steve Marlowe
- Television network: ESPNU

Scoring summary
1	12:27	MSST	Osirus Mitchell 31–yard pass from Tommy Stevens (Jordan Lawless kick) (6 plays, 74 yards, 2:33)	MSST 7–0
1	03:17	LA	Elijah Mitchell 3–yard rush (Stevie Artigue kick) (3 plays, 15 yards, 1:05)	TIE 7–7
2	09:18	MSST	Nick Gibson 8–yard rush (Jordan Lawless kick) (5 plays, 42 yards, 1:56)	MSST 14–7
2	04:31	LA	Nick Ralston 11–yard pass from Levi Lewis (Stevie Artigue kick) (10 plays, 69 yards, 4:41)	TIE 14–14
2	00:31	MSST	Tommy Stevens 4–yard rush (Jordan Lawless kick) (11 plays, 82 yards, 3:54)	MSST 21–14
3	07:07	MSST	Kylin Hill 5–yard rush (Jordan Lawless kick) (9 plays, 65 yards, 4:06)	MSST 28–14
4	13:07	MSST	Austin Williams 12–yard pass from Tommy Stevens (Jordan Lawless kick) (1 play, 12 yards, 0:07)	MSST 35–14
4	09:56	LA	Levi Lewis 1–yard rush (Stevie Artigue kick) (9 plays, 69 yards, 3:03)	MSST 35–21
4	02:45	LA	Trey Ragas 17–yard rush (Stevie Artigue kick) (14 plays, 99 yards, 4:36)	MSST 35–28
4	01:02	MSST	Jordan Lawless 37–yard field goal (6 plays, 23 yards, 1:43)	MSST 38–28

Statistics	Mississippi State	Louisiana
First downs	29	27
Total yards	497	430
Rushing yards	261	163
Passing yards	236	267
Turnovers	2	4
Time of possession	30:37	29:23

Team	Category	Player	Statistics
Mississippi State	Passing	Tommy Stevens	20–30, 236 yards, 2 TDs
Mississippi State	Rushing	Kylin Hill	27 carries, 197 yards, 1 TD
Mississippi State	Receiving	Osirus Mitchell	6 receptions, 88 yards, 1 TD
Louisiana	Passing	Levi Lewis	24–39, 267 yards, 1 TD, 1 INT
Louisiana	Rushing	Raymond Calais	8 carries, 80 yards
Louisiana	Receiving	Jamal Bell	8 receptions, 113 yards

=== Liberty ===
Liberty at Louisiana

Team	1	2	3	4	Total
Flames	7	7	0	0	14
• Ragin' Cajuns	7	14	14	0	35

- Date: September 7, 2019
- Location: Cajun Field
  Lafayette, LA
- Game start: 6:35 p.m. CDT
- Elapsed time: 3 hours and 17 minutes
- Game attendance: 16,231
- Game weather: 94 °F (34 °C) • Weather: Sunny, Hot • Wind: 4 WSW MPH
- Referee: Nate Black
- Television network: ESPN+

Scoring summary
1	10:54	LIB	DJ Stubbs 12–yard pass from Stephen Calvert (Alex Probert kick) (8 plays, 75 yards, 4:06)	LIB 7–0
1	00:36	LA	Levi Lewis 19–yard rush (Stevie Artigue kick) (6 plays, 57 yards, 2:32)	TIE 7–7
2	09:18	LIB	Frankie Hickson 66–yard rush (Alex Probert kick) (3 plays, 89 yards, 1:15)	LIB 14–7
2	08:52	LA	Trey Ragas 75–yard rush (Stevie Artigue kick) (2 plays, 75 yards, 0:26)	TIE 14–14
2	00:21	LA	Ja'Marcus Bradley 2–yard pass from Levi Lewis (Stevie Artigue kick) (8 plays, 84 yards, 1:36)	LA 21–14
3	12:37	LA	Ja'Marcus Bradley 58–yard pass from Levi Lewis (Stevie Artigue kick) (6 plays, 75 yards, 2:23)	LA 28–14
3	04:50	LA	Elijah Mitchell 1–yard rush (Stevie Artigue kick) (12 plays, 68 yards, 5:27)	LA 35–14

Statistics	Liberty	Louisiana
First downs	20	26
Total yards	361	593
Rushing yards	142	407
Passing yards	219	186
Turnovers	1	2
Time of possession	29:17	30:43

Team	Category	Player	Statistics
Liberty	Passing	Stephen Calvert	21–37, 212 yards, 1 TD, 1 INT
Liberty	Rushing	Frankie Hickson	18 carries, 133 yards, 1 TD
Liberty	Receiving	Antonio Gandy-Golden	6 receptions, 70 yards
Louisiana	Passing	Levi Lewis	15–23, 179 yards, 2 TDs, 1 INT
Louisiana	Rushing	Trey Ragas	9 carries, 129 yards, 1 TD
Louisiana	Receiving	Ja'Marcus Bradley	6 receptions, 110 yards, 2 TDs

=== Texas Southern ===
Texas Southern at Louisiana

Team	1	2	3	4	Total
Tigers (Div. I FCS)	3	3	0	0	6
• Ragin' Cajuns	28	28	7	14	77

- Date: September 14, 2019
- Location: Cajun Field
  Lafayette, LA
- Game start: 6:35 p.m. CDT
- Elapsed time: 2 hours and 57 minutes
- Game attendance: 18,183
- Game weather: 91 °F (33 °C) • Weather: Sunny • Wind: 3 E MPH
- Referee: Wayne Winkler
- Television network: ESPN3

Scoring summary
1	13:18	LA	Elijah Mitchell 3–yard rush (Stevie Artigue kick) (5 plays, 63 yards, 1:42)	LA 7–0
1	09:46	LA	Raymond Calais 2–yard rush (Stevie Artigue kick) (8 plays, 62 yards, 2:35)	LA 14–0
1	07:14	TXSO	Richard Garcia III 44–yard field goal (12 plays, 61 yards, 2:25)	LA 14–3
1	06:09	LA	Trey Ragas 9–yard pass from Levi Lewis (Stevie Artigue kick) (3 plays, 42 yards, 0:54)	LA 21–3
1	00:39	LA	Raymond Calais 16–yard rush (Stevie Artigue kick) (6 plays, 51 yards, 1:55)	LA 28–3
2	13:08	LA	Trey Ragas 34–yard rush (Stevie Artigue kick) (4 plays, 49 yards, 1:13)	LA 35–3
2	10:56	LA	Elijah Mitchell 17–yard rush (Stevie Artigue kick) (3 plays, 44 yards, 1:01)	LA 42–3
2	08:16	LA	Peter LeBlanc 53–yard pass from Levi Lewis (Stevie Artigue kick) (2 plays, 53 yards, 1:04)	LA 49–3
2	06:07	TXSO	Richard Garcia III 40–yard field goal (9 plays, 53 yards, 2:09)	LA 49–6
2	04:42	LA	Chris Smith 24–yard rush (Stevie Artigue kick) (4 plays, 36 yards, 1:15)	LA 56–6
3	02:12	LA	Cassius Allen 3–yard pass from Jai'ave Magalei (Stevie Artigue kick) (10 plays, 80 yards, 5:23)	LA 63–6
4	06:27	LA	Michael Orphey Jr. 16–yard rush (Stevie Artigue kick) (9 plays, 77 yards, 9:09)	LA 70–6
4	04:12	LA	Ashton Johnson 32–yard rush (Stevie Artigue kick) (4 plays, 59 yards, 1:31)	LA 77–6

Statistics	Texas Southern	Louisiana
First downs	20	26
Total yards	361	593
Rushing yards	142	407
Passing yards	219	186
Turnovers	1	1
Time of possession	29:17	30:43

Team	Category	Player	Statistics
Texas Southern	Passing	De'Andre Johnson	16–30, 151 yards
Texas Southern	Rushing	Taylor Cook	6 carries, 31 yards
Texas Southern	Receiving	Donnie Corley	6 receptions, 62 yards
Louisiana	Passing	Levi Lewis	10–13, 181 yards, 2 TDs
Louisiana	Rushing	T. J. Wisham	11 carries, 105 yards
Louisiana	Receiving	Peter LeBlanc	1 reception, 53 yards, 1 TD

=== At Ohio ===
Louisiana at Ohio

Team	1	2	3	4	Total
• Ragin' Cajuns	7	3	14	21	45
Bobcats	0	6	6	13	25

- Date: September 21, 2019
- Location: Peden Stadium
  Athens, OH
- Game start: 2:00 p.m. CDT
- Elapsed time: 3 hours and 38 minutes
- Game attendance: 17,416
- Game weather: 83 °F (28 °C) • Weather: Partly Cloudy • Wind: 7 WSW MPH
- Referee: Curt Johnson
- Television network: ESPN+

Scoring summary
1	02:19	LA	Elijah Mitchell 2–yard rush (Stevie Artigue kick) (1 play, 2 yards, 0:05)	LA 7–0
2	10:12	OHIO	Louie Zervos 48–yard field goal (10 plays, 36 yards, 3:52)	LA 7–3
2	01:58	OHIO	Louie Zervos 49–yard field goal (10 plays, 48 yards, 4:28)	LA 7–6
2	00:00	LA	Stevie Artigue 27–yard field goal (10 plays, 67 yards, 1:53)	LA 10–6
3	10:19	LA	Elijah Mitchell 2–yard rush (Stevie Artigue kick) (5 plays, 74 yards, 1:37)	LA 17–6
3	04:13	LA	Nick Ralston 2–yard pass from Levi Lewis (Stevie Artigue kick) (6 plays, 50 yards, 2:11)	LA 24–6
3	00:18	OHIO	Ja'Vahri Portis 1–yard rush (Ja'Vahri Portis two–point conversion rush attempt failed) (9 plays, 75 yards, 3:55)	LA 24–12
4	13:45	LA	Trey Ragas 15–yard rush (Stevie Artigue kick) (5 plays, 65 yards, 1:33)	LA 31–12
4	11:04	OHIO	Ja'Vahri Portis 3–yard rush (DL Knock two–point conversion pass attempt intercepted) (2 plays, 28 yards, 0:46)	LA 31–18
4	07:54	OHIO	Shane Hooks 21–yard pass from Nathan Rourke (Louie Zervos kick) (2 plays, 80 yards, 0:32)	LA 31–25
4	04:30	LA	Elijah Mitchell 2–yard rush (Stevie Artigue kick) (6 plays, 75 yards, 3:24)	LA 38–25
4	03:36	LA	Ja'Marcus Bradley 3–yard pass from Levi Lewis (Stevie Artigue kick) (2 plays, 12 yards, 0:38)	LA 45–25

Statistics	Louisiana	Ohio
First downs	25	23
Total yards	489	380
Rushing yards	285	103
Passing yards	204	277
Turnovers	1	5
Time of possession	32:00	28:00

Team	Category	Player	Statistics
Louisiana	Passing	Levi Lewis	19–29, 188 yards, 2 TDs
Louisiana	Rushing	Elijah Mitchell	17 carries, 143 yards, 3 TDs
Louisiana	Receiving	Quintin Guice	5 receptions, 75 yards, 1 TD
Ohio	Passing	Nathan Rourke	18–38, 277 yards, 1 TD, 3 INTs
Ohio	Rushing	Nathan Rourke	9 carries, 37 yards
Ohio	Receiving	Shane Hooks	3 receptions, 96 yards, 1 TD

=== At Georgia Southern ===
Louisiana at Georgia Southern

Team	1	2	3	4	Total
• Ragin' Cajuns	7	10	7	13	37
Eagles	3	10	8	3	24

- Date: September 28, 2019
- Location: Paulson Stadium
  Statesboro, GA
- Game start: 6:05 p.m. CDT
- Elapsed time: 2 hours and 55 minutes
- Game attendance: 19,220
- Game weather: 88 °F (31 °C) • Weather: Clear • Wind: 7 SE MPH
- Referee: Jason Autrey
- Television network: ESPN+

Scoring summary
1	13:42	LA	Elijah Mitchell 5–yard rush (Stevie Artigue kick) (5 plays, 75 yards, 1:18)	LA 7–0
1	05:20	GASO	Tyler Bass 28–yard field goal (15 plays, 64 yards, 8:22)	LA 7–3
2	12:09	GASO	Tyler Bass 44–yard field goal (5 plays, 16 yards, 2:42)	LA 7–6
2	08:05	LA	Trey Ragas 3–yard rush (Kenneth Almendares kick) (10 plays, 75 yards, 4:04)	LA 14–6
2	04:58	GASO	Logan Wright 2–yard rush (Tyler Bass kick) (2 plays, 7 yards, 0:49)	LA 14–13
2	00:00	LA	Stevie Artigue 25–yard field goal (14 plays, 67 yards, 7:10)	LA 17–13
3	08:04	LA	Ja'Marcus Bradley 1–yard pass from Levi Lewis (Kenneth Almendares kick) (11 plays, 55 yards, 4:44)	LA 24–13
3	00:15	GASO	J.D. King 1–yard rush (J.D. King two–point conversion rush) (14 plays, 78 yards, 7:41)	LA 24–21
4	12:30	LA	Elijah Mitchell 19–yard rush (Stevie Artigue kick) (8 plays, 75 yards, 2:45)	LA 31–21
4	05:35	GASO	Tyler Bass 31–yard field goal (14 plays, 74 yards, 6:50)	LA 31–24
4	02:34	LA	Trey Ragas 1–yard rush (Kenneth Almendares kick failed) (6 plays, 75 yards, 3:01)	LA 37–21

Statistics	Louisiana	Georgia Southern
First downs	23	18
Total yards	440	252
Rushing yards	275	215
Passing yards	165	37
Turnovers	2	0
Time of possession	26:04	33:56

Team	Category	Player	Statistics
Louisiana	Passing	Levi Lewis	11–18, 165 yards, 1 TD
Louisiana	Rushing	Trey Ragas	16 carries, 131 yards, 2 TDs
Louisiana	Receiving	Jarrod Jackson	1 reception, 51 yards
Georgia Southern	Passing	Shai Werts	6–12, 37 yards
Georgia Southern	Rushing	Shai Werts	21 carries, 93 yards
Georgia Southern	Receiving	NaJee Thompson	4 receptions, 24 yards

=== Appalachian State ===
Appalachian State at Louisiana

Team	1	2	3	4	Total
• No. 28 Mountaineers	7	0	3	7	17
Ragin' Cajuns	0	7	0	0	7

- Date: October 9, 2019
- Location: Cajun Field
  Lafayette, LA
- Game start: 7:05 p.m. CDT
- Elapsed time: 3 hours
- Game attendance: 21,012
- Game weather: 83 °F (28 °C) • Weather: Clear • Wind: 4 S MPH
- Referee: Kyle Olson
- TV announcers (ESPN2): Clay Matvick (play-by-play) & Ryan Leaf (analyst)

Scoring summary
1	05:05	APST	Zac Thomas 7–yard rush (Chandler Staton kick) (7 plays, 95 yards, 2:58)	APST 7–0
2	00:08	LA	Nick Ralston 14–yard pass from Levi Lewis (Stevie Artigue kick) (10 plays, 94 yards, 3:55)	TIE 7–7
3	05:26	APST	Chandler Staton 40–yard field goal (11 plays, 52 yards, 4:52)	APST 10–7
4	01:55	APST	Zach Thomas 7–yard rush (Chandler Staton kick) (19 plays, 97 yards, 10:11)	APST 17–7

Statistics	Appalachian State	Louisiana
First downs	21	16
Total yards	343	254
Rushing yards	196	123
Passing yards	147	131
Turnovers	0	0
Time of possession	34:38	25:22

Team	Category	Player	Statistics
Appalachian State	Passing	Zac Thomas	11–17, 147 yards
Appalachian State	Rushing	Darrynton Evans	22 carries, 69 yards
Appalachian State	Receiving	Corey Sutton	2 receptions, 58 yards
Louisiana	Passing	Levi Lewis	13–24, 131 yards, 1 TD
Louisiana	Rushing	Elijah Mitchell	13 carries, 68 yards
Louisiana	Receiving	Jarrod Jackson	5 receptions, 68 yards

=== At Arkansas State ===
Louisiana at Arkansas State

Team	1	2	3	4	Total
• Ragin' Cajuns	7	17	0	13	37
Red Wolves	7	3	3	7	20

- Date: October 17, 2019
- Location: Centennial Bank Stadium
  Jonesboro, AR
- Game start: 6:32 p.m. CDT
- Elapsed time: 3 hours and 21 minutes
- Game attendance: 19,176
- Game weather: 60 °F (16 °C) • Weather: Fair • Wind: 3 SSE MPH
- Referee: Wayne Winkler
- Television network: ESPNU

Scoring summary
1	10:13	ARST	Brandon Bowling 10–yard pass from Layne Hatcher (Blake Grupe kick) (12 plays, 95 yards, 4:47)	ARST 7–0
1	00:11	LA	Trey Ragas 1–yard rush (Stevie Artigue kick) (9 plays, 74 yards, 3:13)	TIE 7–7
2	09:00	ARST	Blake Grupe 25–yard field goal (16 plays, 71 yards, 3:43)	ARST 10–7
2	05:12	LA	Elijah Mitchell 11–yard rush (Stevie Artigue kick) (9 plays, 74 yards, 3:43)	LA 14–10
2	02:35	LA	Raymond Calais 80–yard rush (Stevie Artigue kick) (1 play, 80 yards, 0:11)	LA 21–10
2	00:06	LA	Stevie Artigue 25–yard field goal (12 plays, 56 yards, 1:33)	LA 24–10
3	04:29	ARST	Blake Grupe 46–yard field goal (9 plays, 42 yards, 3:32)	LA 24–13
4	11:35	ARST	Kirk Merritt 25–yard pass from Layne Hatcher (Blake Grupe kick) (11 plays, 86 yards, 4:18)	LA 24–20
4	06:19	LA	Elijah Mitchell 1–yard rush (Stevie Artigue kick failed) (12 plays, 52 yards, 5:08)	LA 30–20
4	03:18	LA	Raymond Calais 38–yard rush (Stevie Artigue kick) (2 plays, 41 yards, 0:14)	LA 37–20

Statistics	Louisiana	Arkansas State
First downs	26	27
Total yards	496	473
Rushing yards	315	170
Passing yards	181	303
Turnovers	1	1
Time of possession	26:50	33:10

Team	Category	Player	Statistics
Louisiana	Passing	Levi Lewis	17–24, 181 yards, 1 INT
Louisiana	Rushing	Raymond Calais	8 carries, 144 yards, 2 TDs
Louisiana	Receiving	Ja'Marcus Bradley	6 receptions, 72 yards
Arkansas State	Passing	Layne Hatcher	23–34, 303 yards, 2 TDs, 1 INT
Arkansas State	Rushing	Marcel Murray	35 carries, 164 yards
Arkansas State	Receiving	Omar Bayless	9 receptions, 150 yards

=== Texas State ===
Texas State at Louisiana

Team	1	2	3	4	Total
Bobcats	0	3	0	0	3
• Ragin' Cajuns	0	10	21	0	31

- Date: November 2, 2019
- Location: Cajun Field
  Lafayette, LA
- Game start: 4:06 p.m. CDT
- Elapsed time: 3 hours and 1 minute
- Game attendance: 21,063
- Game weather: 62 °F (17 °C) • Weather: Sunny • Wind: 12 N MPH
- Referee: Jeremy Parker
- Television network: ESPN+

Scoring summary
2	06:28	LA	Elijah Mitchell 39–yard rush (Stevie Artigue kick) (6 plays, 68 yards, 2:16)	LA 7–0
2	01:44	TXST	Joshua Rowland 33–yard field goal (10 plays, 60 yards, 4:44)	LA 7–3
2	00:00	LA	Stevie Artigue 46–yard field goal (10 plays, 50 yards, 1:44)	LA 10–3
3	12:43	LA	Nick Ralston 24–yard pass from Levi Lewis (Stevie Artigue kick) (5 plays, 62 yards, 2:17)	LA 17–3
3	03:32	LA	Chris Smith 24–yard rush (Stevie Artigue kick) (12 plays, 83 yards, 5:42)	LA 24–3
3	00:40	LA	Raymond Calais 34–yard pass from Levi Lewis (Stevie Artigue kick) (4 plays, 60 yards, 1:34)	LA 31–3

Statistics	Texas State	Louisiana
First downs	17	24
Total yards	264	479
Rushing yards	58	296
Passing yards	206	183
Turnovers	2	1
Time of possession	29:28	30:32

Team	Category	Player	Statistics
Texas State	Passing	Tyler Vitt	24–34, 206 yards, 2 INTs
Texas State	Rushing	Tyler Vitt	10 carries, 38 yards
Texas State	Receiving	Trevis Graham Jr.	6 receptions, 52 yards
Louisiana	Passing	Levi Lewis	13–21, 183 yards, 2 TDs
Louisiana	Rushing	Elijah Mitchell	13 carries, 126 yards, 1 TD
Louisiana	Receiving	Jalen Williams	3 receptions, 50 yards

=== At Coastal Carolina ===
Louisiana at Coastal Carolina

Team	1	2	3	4	Total
• Ragin' Cajuns	14	10	21	3	48
Chanticleers	0	0	0	7	7

- Date: November 7, 2019
- Location: Brooks Stadium
  Conway, SC
- Game start: 7:32 p.m. CST
- Elapsed time: 3 hours and 5 minutes
- Game attendance: 14,857
- Game weather: 66 °F (19 °C) • Weather: Clear • Wind: 1 NW MPH
- Referee: Wayne Winkler
- Television network: ESPNU

Scoring summary
1	11:19	LA	Levi Lewis 6–yard rush (Stevie Artigue kick) (8 plays, 66 yards, 3:41)	LA 7–0
1	03:31	LA	Trey Ragas 1–yard rush (Stevie Artigue kick) (9 plays, 80 yards, 4:29)	LA 14–0
2	07:17	LA	Neal Johnson 1–yard pass from Levi Lewis (Stevie Artigue kick) (12 plays, 80 yards, 5:35)	LA 21–0
2	00:47	LA	Stevie Artigue 21–yard field goal (11 plays, 55 yards, 4:52)	LA 24–0
3	11:50	LA	Jalen Williams 10–yard pass from Levi Lewis (Stevie Artigue kick) (8 plays, 65 yards, 2:17)	LA 31–0
3	03:55	LA	Ja'Marcus Bradley 10–yard pass from Levi Lewis (Stevie Artigue kick) (6 plays, 67 yards, 2:35)	LA 38–0
3	00:24	LA	Chris Smith 52–yard rush (Stevie Artigue kick) (1 play, 52 yards, 0:13)	LA 45–0
4	08:22	LA	Stevie Artigue 28–yard field goal (13 plays, 62 yards, 5:32)	LA 48–0
4	03:58	CCU	Sam Denmark 44–yard pass from Fred Payton (Massimo Biscardi kick) (7 plays, 75 yards, 4:24)	LA 48–7

Statistics	Louisiana	Coastal Carolina
First downs	30	14
Total yards	564	236
Rushing yards	225	103
Passing yards	339	133
Turnovers	0	1
Time of possession	33:26	26:34

Team	Category	Player	Statistics
Louisiana	Passing	Levi Lewis	26–30, 296 yards, 3 TDs
Louisiana	Rushing	Chris Smith	8 carries, 99 yards, 1 TD
Louisiana	Receiving	Ja'Marcus Bradley	7 receptions, 71 yards, 1 TD
Coastal Carolina	Passing	Bryce Carpenter	9-20, 71 yards
Coastal Carolina	Rushing	C. J. Marable	10 carries, 54 yards
Coastal Carolina	Receiving	Sam Denmark	1 reception, 44 yards, 1 TD

=== At South Alabama ===
Louisiana at South Alabama

Team	1	2	3	4	Total
• Ragin' Cajuns	3	14	6	14	37
Jaguars	7	7	7	6	27

- Date: November 16, 2019
- Location: Ladd–Peebles Stadium
  Mobile, AL
- Game start: 4:00 p.m. CST
- Elapsed time: 3 hours and 24 minutes
- Game attendance: 16,748
- Game weather: 62 °F (17 °C) • Weather: Sunny • Wind: 8 NNW MPH
- Referee: Marshall Lewis
- Television network: ESPN+

Scoring summary
1	09:16	LA	Stevie Artigue 22–yard field goal (15 plays, 66 yards, 5:44)	LA 3–0
1	06:28	USA	Carlos Davis 20–yard rush (Frankie Onate kick) (6 plays, 71 yards, 2:48)	USA 7–3
2	14:19	LA	Neal Johnson 9–yard pass from Levi Lewis (Stevie Artigue kick) (11 plays, 69 yards, 4:28)	LA 10–7
2	09:44	USA	Jared Wilson 4–yard rush (Frankie Onate kick) (8 plays, 75 yards, 4:35)	USA 14–10
2	07:30	LA	Hunter Bergeron 1–yard pass from Levi Lewis (Stevie Artigue kick) (6 plays, 36 yards, 2:14)	LA 17–14
3	09:51	USA	Kawaan Baker 0–yard fumble recovered and returned (Frankie Onate kick) (0 plays, 0 yards, 0:00)	USA 21–17
3	06:41	LA	Stevie Artigue 25–yard field goal (8 plays, 59 yards, 3:10)	USA 21–20
3	02:44	LA	Stevie Artigue 20–yard field goal (4 plays, 2 yards, 1:40)	LA 23–21
4	07:51	LA	Elijah Mitchell 1–yard rush (Stevie Artigue kick) (17 plays, 85 yards, 7:12)	LA 30–21
4	04:12	LA	Trey Ragas 23–yard rush (Stevie Artigue kick) (3 plays, 47 yards, 1:12)	LA 37–21
4	02:48	USA	Tra Minter 11–yard rush (Desmond Trotter two–point conversion attempt failed) (4 plays, 75 yards, 1:24)	LA 37–27

Statistics	Louisiana	South Alabama
First downs	23	23
Total yards	391	467
Rushing yards	255	351
Passing yards	136	116
Turnovers	1	0
Time of possession	30:02	29:58

Team	Category	Player	Statistics
Louisiana	Passing	Levi Lewis	16–29, 136 yards, 2 TD
Louisiana	Rushing	Elijah Mitchell	17 carries, 117 yards, 1 TD
Louisiana	Receiving	Jamal Bell	3 receptions, 51 yards
South Alabama	Passing	Desmond Trotter	8–15, 116 yards
South Alabama	Rushing	Tra Minter	22 carries, 137 yards, 1 TD
South Alabama	Receiving	Cade Sutherland	3 receptions, 64 yards

=== Troy ===
Troy at Louisiana

Team	1	2	3	4	Total
Trojans	3	0	0	0	3
• RV Ragin' Cajuns	14	17	19	3	53

- Date: November 23, 2019
- Location: Cajun Field
  Lafayette, LA
- Game start: 4:05 p.m. CST
- Elapsed time: 3 hours and 20 minutes
- Game attendance: 14,262
- Game weather: 61 °F (16 °C) • Weather: Sunny • Wind: 7 NW MPH
- Referee: Jason Autrey
- Television network: ESPN+

Scoring summary
1	11:41	LA	Ja'Marcus Bradley 12–yard pass from Levi Lewis (Stevie Artigue kick) (10 plays, 69 yards, 3:19)	LA 7–0
1	03:37	TROY	Tyler Sumpter 30–yard field goal (9 plays, 45 yards, 3:33)	LA 7–3
1	00:55	LA	Raymond Calais 27–yard rush (Stevie Artigue kick) (6 plays, 61 yards, 2:42)	LA 14–3
2	11:44	LA	Trey Ragas 1–yard rush (Stevie Artigue kick) (6 plays, 72 yards, 2:24)	LA 21–3
2	08:18	LA	Elijah Mitchell 11–yard rush (Stevie Artigue kick) (6 plays, 67 yards, 2:48)	LA 28–3
2	00:17	LA	Stevie Artigue 49–yard field goal (11 plays, 48 yards, 1:59)	LA 31–3
3	11:34	LA	Stevie Artigue 44–yard field goal (5 plays, 18 yards, 1:58)	LA 34–3
3	11:16	LA	Team Safety (0 plays, 0 yards, 0:00)	LA 36–3
3	08:26	LA	Trey Ragas 8–yard rush (Stevie Artigue kick) (7 plays, 59 yards, 2:50)	LA 43–3
3	05:36	LA	Chris Smith 80–yard rush (Stevie Artigue kick) (1 play, 80 yards, 0:16)	LA 50–3
4	09:50	LA	Stevie Artigue 31–yard field goal (13 plays, 83 yards, 7:39)	LA 53–3

Statistics	Troy	Louisiana
First downs	22	28
Total yards	359	598
Rushing yards	156	254
Passing yards	203	344
Turnovers	3	0
Time of possession	27:04	32:56

Team	Category	Player	Statistics
Troy	Passing	Kaleb Barker	15–32, 178 yards, 2 INTs
Troy	Rushing	DK Billingsley	10 carries, 68 yards
Troy	Receiving	Kaylon Geiger	6 receptions, 44 yards
Louisiana	Passing	Levi Lewis	21–33, 273 yards, 1 TD
Louisiana	Rushing	Chris Smith	5 carries, 87 yards, 1 TD
Louisiana	Receiving	Ja'Marcus Bradley	5 receptions, 96 yards, 1 TD

=== Louisiana–Monroe ===
Louisiana–Monroe at Louisiana

Team	1	2	3	4	Total
Warhawks	7	7	10	6	30
• RV Ragin' Cajuns	7	14	7	3	31

- Date: November 30, 2019
- Location: Cajun Field
  Lafayette, LA
- Game start: 6:33 p.m. CST
- Elapsed time: 3 hours and 28 minutes
- Game attendance: 14,227
- Game weather: 75 °F (24 °C) • Weather: Cloudy • Wind: 14 SSW MPH
- Referee: Jeremy Parker
- Television network: ESPNU

Scoring summary
1	10:02	LA	Jamal Bell 36–yard pass from Levi Lewis (Stevie Artigue kick) (4 plays, 40 yards, 1:19)	LA 7–0
1	03:03	ULM	Caleb Evans 19–yard rush (Jared Porter kick) (7 plays, 62 yards, 3:17)	TIE 7–7
2	10:41	LA	Ja'Marcus Bradley 42–yard pass from Levi Lewis (Stevie Artigue kick) (7 plays, 99 yards, 4:03)	LA 14–7
2	02:24	ULM	Josh Pederson 47–yard pass from Caleb Evans (Jared Porter kick) (4 plays, 80 yards, 1:34)	TIE 14–14
2	00:28	LA	Raymond Calais 83–yard rush (Stevie Artigue kick) (1 play, 83 yards, 0:11)	LA 21–14
3	08:17	ULM	Jonathan Hodoh 40–yard pass from Caleb Evans (Jared Porter kick) (5 plays, 54 yards, 1:38)	TIE 21–21
3	05:34	LA	Peter LeBlanc 2–yard pass from Levi Lewis (Stevie Artigue kick) (5 plays, 75 yards, 2:43)	LA 28–21
3	00:05	ULM	Jared Porter 23–yard field goal (12 plays, 80 yards, 5:29)	LA 28–24
4	07:56	ULM	Austin Vaughn 11–yard rush (Jared Porter kick failed) (8 plays, 99 yards, 3:21)	ULM 30–28
4	01:21	LA	Stevie Artigue 27–yard field goal (15 plays, 62 yards, 6:35)	LA 31–30

Statistics	Louisiana–Monroe	Louisiana
First downs	25	20
Total yards	570	522
Rushing yards	240	252
Passing yards	330	270
Turnovers	0	1
Time of possession	27:46	32:14

Team	Category	Player	Statistics
Louisiana–Monroe	Passing	Caleb Evans	22–37, 330 yards, 2 TDs, 1 INT
Louisiana–Monroe	Rushing	Josh Johnson	13 carries, 109 yards
Louisiana–Monroe	Receiving	Josh Pederson	6 receptions, 92 yards, 1 TD
Louisiana	Passing	Levi Lewis	15–23, 270 yards, 3 TDs
Louisiana	Rushing	Raymond Calais	8 carries, 107 yards, 1 TD
Louisiana	Receiving	Ja'Marcus Bradley	4 receptions, 127 yards, 1 TD

=== At Appalachian State (Sun Belt Championship game) ===
Louisiana at Appalachian State

Team	1	2	3	4	Total
RV Ragin' Cajuns	7	10	7	14	38
• No. 21 Mountaineers	21	14	7	3	45

- Date: December 7, 2019
- Location: Kidd Brewer Stadium
  Boone, NC
- Game start: 11:03 a.m. CST
- Elapsed time: 3 hours and 37 minutes
- Game attendance: 18,618
- Game weather: 45 °F (7 °C) • Weather: Sunny and Clear • Wind: Light
- Referee: Jason Autrey
- TV announcers (ESPN): Clay Matvick (play-by-play), Ryan Leaf (analyst), Quint Kessenich (sideline)

Scoring summary
1	13:02	APST	Darrynton Evans 58–yard pass from Zac Thomas (Chandler Staton kick) (6 plays, 75 yards, 1:58)	APST 7–0
1	09:38	APST	Darrynton Evans 8–yard rush (Chandler Staton kick) (5 plays, 47 yards, 2:00)	APST 14–0
1	01:43	APST	Darrynton Evans 5–yard pass from Zac Thomas (Chandler Staton kick) (14 plays, 76 yards, 6:42)	APST 21–0
1	00:25	LA	Peter LeBlanc 37–yard pass from Levi Lewis (Stevie Artigue kick) (5 plays, 71 yards, 1:12)	APST 21–7
2	13:27	APST	Marc Williams 29–yard rush (Chandler Staton kick) (5 plays, 75 yards, 1:58)	APST 28–7
2	08:13	LA	Elijah Mitchell 1–yard pass from Levi Lewis (Stevie Artigue kick) (11 plays, 76 yards, 5:08)	APST 28–14
2	04:13	APST	Daetrich Harrington 25–yard rush (Chandler Staton kick) (9 plays, 75 yards, 3:54)	APST 35–14
2	00:03	LA	Stevie Artigue 53–yard field goal (7 plays, 37 yards, 1:06)	APST 35–17
3	05:57	APST	Josh Thomas 16–yard interception returned (Chandler Staton kick) (0 plays, 0 yards, 0:00)	APST 42–17
3	02:41	LA	Ja'Marcus Bradley 2–yard pass from Levi Lewis (Stevie Artigue kick) (8 plays, 63 yards, 3:09)	APST 42–24
4	08:12	APST	Chandler Staton 35–yard field goal (8 plays, 43 yards, 4:41)	APST 45–24
4	04:18	LA	Elijah Mitchell 1–yard rush (Stevie Artigue kick) (13 plays, 76 yards, 3:46)	APST 45–31
4	01:19	LA	Peter LeBlanc 38–yard pass from Levi Lewis (Stevie Artigue kick) (6 plays, 64 yards, 1:09)	APST 45–38

Statistics	Louisiana	Appalachian State
First downs	31	20
Total yards	513	416
Rushing yards	159	267
Passing yards	354	149
Turnovers	3	1
Time of possession	29:49	30:11

Team	Category	Player	Statistics
Louisiana	Passing	Levi Lewis	24–46, 354 yards, 4 TD, 1 INT
Louisiana	Rushing	Elijah Mitchell	18 carries, 85 yards, 1 TD
Louisiana	Receiving	Peter LeBlanc	3 receptions, 118 yards, 2 TDs
Appalachian State	Passing	Zac Thomas	9–17, 149 yards, 2 TDs
Appalachian State	Rushing	Daetrich Harrington	9 carries, 89 yards, 1 TD
Appalachian State	Receiving	Darrynton Evans	2 receptions, 63 yards, 2 TDs

=== Vs. Miami (OH) (LendingTree Bowl) ===
Louisiana vs. Miami (OH)

Team	1	2	3	4	Total
• RV Ragin' Cajuns	0	10	14	3	27
RedHawks	0	7	3	7	17

- Date: January 6, 2020
- Location: Ladd–Peebles Stadium
  Mobile, AL
- Game start: 6:30 p.m. CST
- Elapsed time: 3 hours and 12 minutes
- Game attendance: 29,212
- Game weather: 58 °F (14 °C) • Weather: Clear • Wind: 6 SW MPH
- Referee: Mike Roche
- TV announcers (ESPN): Dave LaMont (play-by-play), Gene Chizik (analyst) and Lauren Sisler (sideline)

Scoring summary
2	10:25	MIU	Jaylon Bester 5–yard rush (Sam Sloman kick) (10 plays, 66 yards, 4:35)	MIU 7–0
2	06:32	LA	Stevie Artigue 33–yard field goal (10 plays, 59 yards, 3:53)	MIU 7–3
2	01:05	LA	Elijah Mitchell 2–yard rush (Stevie Artigue kick) (7 plays, 57 yards, 3:02)	LA 10–7
3	10:51	LA	Ja'Marcus Bradley 9–yard pass from Levi Lewis (Stevie Artigue kick) (9 plays, 70 yards, 4:09)	LA 17–7
3	05:18	MIU	Sam Sloman 39–yard field goal (11 plays, 58 yards, 5:33)	LA 17–10
3	02:26	LA	Ja'Marcus Bradley 12–yard pass from Levi Lewis (Stevie Artigue kick) (9 plays, 79 yards, 2:52)	LA 24–10
4	11:35	MIU	Jaylon Bester 1–yard rush (Sam Sloman kick) (14 plays, 77 yards, 5:51)	LA 24–17
4	04:35	LA	Stevie Artigue 38–yard field goal (6 plays, 27 yards, 2:50)	LA 27–17

Statistics	Louisiana	Miami (OH)
First downs	18	22
Total yards	401	351
Rushing yards	155	103
Passing yards	246	248
Turnovers	0	1
Time of possession	28:17	31:43

Team	Category	Player	Statistics
Louisiana	Passing	Levi Lewis	19–26, 246 yards, 2 TDs
Louisiana	Rushing	Levi Lewis	8 carries, 62 yards
Louisiana	Receiving	Ja'Marcus Bradley	7 receptions, 88 yards, 2 TDs
Miami (OH)	Passing	Brett Gabbert	22–31, 248 yards
Miami (OH)	Rushing	Tyre Shelton	6 carries, 59 yards
Miami (OH)	Receiving	Jack Sorenson	10 receptions, 107 yards

== Rankings ==
Ranking movements Legend: ██ Increase in ranking ██ Decrease in ranking — = Not ranked RV = Received votes
	Week																
Poll	Pre	1	2	3	4	5	6	7	8	9	10	11	12	13	14	15	Final
AP	—	—	—	—	—	—	—	—	—	—	—	—	—	RV	RV	—	RV
Coaches	—	—	—	—	—	—	—	—	—	—	—	—	RV	RV	RV	RV	RV
CFP	Not released										—	—	—	—	—	—	Not released

== Postseason ==
=== All-Sun Belt Conference Football Team ===
Offense

1st team

- Kevin Dotson - SR, Offensive Lineman
- Robert Hunt – SR, Offensive Lineman

2nd team

- Elijah Mitchell – JR, Running Back
- Ja'Marcus Bradley – SR, Wide Receiver

3rd team

- Raymond Calais – SR, Running Back
- Trey Ragas – JR, Running Back

Defensive

2nd team

- Zi'Yon Hill – SO, Defensive Lineman
- Joe Dillon – JR, Linebacker
- Michael Jacquet – SR, Defensive Back

Special teams

1st team

- Raymond Calais – SR, Return Specialist

2nd team

- Rhys Burns – SO, Punter

3rd team

- Stevie Artigue – SR, Kicker
- Raymond Calais – SR, All-Purpose

Honorable Mention

- Jacques Boudreaux – SR, Linebacker
- Jarrod Jackson – R-SR, Wide Receiver
- Chauncey Manac – R-JR, Linebacker
- Nick Ralston – GR, Tight End

=== Louisiana Sports Writers Association All-Louisiana Team ===
Offense

1st team

- Kevin Dotson - SR, Offensive Lineman
- Robert Hunt – SR, Offensive Lineman
- Elijah Mitchell – JR, Running Back

2nd team

- Ja'Marcus Bradley – SR, Wide Receiver

Defensive

1st team

- Jacques Boudreaux – SR, Linebacker

2nd team

- Zi'Yon Hill – SO, Defensive Lineman

Special teams

1st team

- Raymond Calais – SR, Return Specialist
- Rhys Burns – SO, Punter

Honorable Mention

- Joe Dillon – R-SR, Linebacker

=== Postseason Personal Accolades ===
Award	Player	Year	Position
SBC Coach of the Year	Billy Napier	2nd Year	Head coach
Pro Football Focus All-American	Kevin Dotson	SR	OL
Sports Illustrated First Team All-American	Kevin Dotson	SR	OL
USA Today First Team All-American	Kevin Dotson	SR	OL
Associated Press First Team All-American	Kevin Dotson	SR	OL
FootballScoop running backs coach of the Year	Jabbar Juluke	3rd Year	RB Coach
Park Place Hospital Male Student–Athlete Comeback of the Year	Joe Dillon	R-SR	LB

=== Players in the NFL ===
==== Players Drafted ====
Round	Pick	Player	Position	NFL Club
2	39	Robert Hunt	OG	Miami Dolphins
4	135	Kevin Dotson	OG	Pittsburgh Steelers
7	245	Raymond Calais	RB	Tampa Bay Buccaneers

==== Players Signed (Undrafted Free Agents) ====
Player	Position	NFL Club
Michael Jacquet	CB	Philadelphia Eagles
Ja'Marcus Bradley	WR	Cleveland Browns
