= 2019 Georgia Southern Eagles football team =

American college football season

2019 Georgia Southern Eagles football

Cure Bowl, L 16–23 vs. Liberty
- Conference: Sun Belt Conference
- East Division
- Record: 7–6 (5–3 Sun Belt)
- Head coach: Chad Lunsford (2nd season)
- Offensive coordinator: Bob DeBesse (2nd season)
- Offensive scheme: Pistol
- Defensive coordinator: Scot Sloan (2nd season)
- Base defense: 3–4
- Home stadium: Paulson Stadium

2019 Sun Belt Conference football standings
	Conf.			Overall
Team	W		L	W		L
East Division
No. 19 Appalachian State x$	7	–	1	13	–	1
Georgia Southern	5	–	3	7	–	6
Georgia State	4	–	4	7	–	6
Troy	3	–	5	5	–	7
Coastal Carolina	2	–	6	5	–	7
West Division
Louisiana x	7	–	1	11	–	3
Arkansas State	5	–	3	8	–	5
Louisiana–Monroe	4	–	4	5	–	7
Texas State	2	–	6	3	–	9
South Alabama	1	–	7	2	–	10
Championship: Appalachian State 45, Louisiana 38
$ – Conference champion; x – Division champion/co-champions; Rankings from AP Poll

The 2019 Georgia Southern Eagles football team represented Georgia Southern University during the 2019 NCAA Division I FBS football season. The Eagles played their home games at Paulson Stadium in Statesboro, Georgia and competed in the East Division of the Sun Belt Conference. They were led by second year head coach Chad Lunsford.

== Preseason ==
On August 2, 2019, it was announced that QB Shai Werts and DE Quan Griffin had been indefinitely suspended following their arrests, which were not related. The charges against Werts were subsequently dropped, after what was believed to be cocaine on his car was tested to be bird feces, and he has since been cleared to play.

== Schedule ==
Date	Time	Opponent	Site	TV	Result	Attendance
August 31	7:30 p.m.	at No. 6 LSU*	Tiger Stadium; Baton Rouge, LA	SECN	L 3–55	97,420
September 7	6:00 p.m.	No. 6 (FCS) Maine*	Paulson Stadium; Statesboro, GA	ESPN+	W 26–18	17,202
September 14	3:30 p.m.	at Minnesota*	TCF Bank Stadium; Minneapolis, MN	BTN	L 32–35	41,021
September 28	6:00 p.m.	Louisiana	Paulson Stadium; Statesboro, GA	ESPN+	L 24–37	19,220
October 3	7:30 p.m.	at South Alabama	Ladd–Peebles Stadium; Mobile, AL	ESPNU	W 20–17 ^{2OT}	20,013
October 19	3:00 p.m.	Coastal Carolina	Paulson Stadium; Statesboro, GA	ESPN3	W 30–27 ^{3OT}	11,015
October 26	3:00 p.m.	New Mexico State*^{†}	Paulson Stadium; Statesboro, GA	ESPN3	W 41–7	10,907
October 31	8:00 p.m.	at No. 20 Appalachian State	Kidd Brewer Stadium; Boone, NC (rivalry)	ESPNU	W 24–21	18,796
November 9	3:30 p.m.	at Troy	Veterans Memorial Stadium; Troy, AL	ESPN+	L 28–49	22,108
November 16	3:00 p.m.	Louisiana–Monroe	Paulson Stadium; Statesboro, GA	ESPN+	W 51–29	10,266
November 23	3:00 p.m.	at Arkansas State	Centennial Bank Stadium; Jonesboro, AR	ESPN+	L 33–38	18,319
November 30	6:00 p.m.	Georgia State	Paulson Stadium; Statesboro, GA (rivalry)	ESPN+	W 38–10	15,175
December 21	2:30 p.m.	vs. Liberty*	Exploria Stadium; Orlando, FL (Cure Bowl)	CBSSN	L 16–23	18,158
*Non-conference game; ^{†}Homecoming; Rankings from AP Poll and CFP Rankings after November 5 released prior to game; All times are in Eastern time

== Game summaries ==
=== At LSU ===
	1	2	3	4	Total
Eagles	0	3	0	0	3
No. 6 Tigers	21	21	10	3	55

=== Maine ===
	1	2	3	4	Total
No. 6 (FCS) Black Bears	3	0	0	15	18
Eagles	0	10	6	10	26

=== At Minnesota ===
	1	2	3	4	Total
Eagles	10	10	0	12	32
Golden Gophers	14	7	0	14	35

=== Louisiana ===
Louisiana at Georgia Southern

Team	1	2	3	4	Total
• Ragin' Cajuns	7	10	7	13	37
Eagles	3	10	8	3	24

- Date: September 28, 2019
- Location: Paulson Stadium
  Statesboro, GA
- Game start: 7:05 p.m. EDT
- Elapsed time: 2 hours and 55 minutes
- Game attendance: 19,220
- Game weather: 88 °F (31 °C) • Weather: Clear • Wind: 7 SE MPH
- Referee: Jason Autrey
- Television network: ESPN+

Scoring summary
1	13:42	LA	Elijah Mitchell 5–yard rush (Stevie Artigue kick) (5 plays, 75 yards, 1:18)	LA 7–0
1	05:20	GASO	Tyler Bass 28–yard field goal (15 plays, 64 yards, 8:22)	LA 7–3
2	12:09	GASO	Tyler Bass 44–yard field goal (5 plays, 16 yards, 2:42)	LA 7–6
2	08:05	LA	Trey Ragas 3–yard rush (Kenneth Almendares kick) (10 plays, 75 yards, 4:04)	LA 14–6
2	04:58	GASO	Logan Wright 2–yard rush (Tyler Bass kick) (2 plays, 7 yards, 0:49)	LA 14–13
2	00:00	LA	Stevie Artigue 25–yard field goal (14 plays, 67 yards, 7:10)	LA 17–13
3	08:04	LA	Ja'Marcus Bradley 1–yard pass from Levi Lewis (Kenneth Almendares kick) (11 plays, 55 yards, 4:44)	LA 24–13
3	00:15	GASO	J.D. King 1–yard rush (J.D. King two–point conversion rush) (14 plays, 78 yards, 7:41)	LA 24–21
4	12:30	LA	Elijah Mitchell 19–yard rush (Stevie Artigue kick) (8 plays, 75 yards, 2:45)	LA 31–21
4	05:35	GASO	Tyler Bass 31–yard field goal (14 plays, 74 yards, 6:50)	LA 31–24
4	02:34	LA	Trey Ragas 1–yard rush (Kenneth Almendares kick failed) (6 plays, 75 yards, 3:01)	LA 37–21

Statistics	Louisiana	Georgia Southern
First downs	23	18
Total yards	440	252
Rushing yards	275	215
Passing yards	165	37
Turnovers	2	0
Time of possession	26:04	33:56

Team	Category	Player	Statistics
Louisiana	Passing	Levi Lewis	11–18, 165 yards, 1 TD
Louisiana	Rushing	Trey Ragas	16 carries, 131 yards, 2 TDs
Louisiana	Receiving	Jarrod Jackson	1 reception, 51 yards
Georgia Southern	Passing	Shai Werts	6–12, 37 yards
Georgia Southern	Rushing	Shai Werts	21 carries, 93 yards
Georgia Southern	Receiving	NaJee Thompson	4 receptions, 24 yards

=== At South Alabama ===
	1	2	3	4	OT	2OT	Total
Eagles	0	10	0	7	0	3	20
Jaguars	0	7	7	3	0	0	17

=== Coastal Carolina ===
	1	2	3	4	OT	2OT	3OT	Total
Chanticleers	0	7	0	3	7	7	3	27
Eagles	3	7	0	0	7	7	6	30

=== New Mexico State ===
	1	2	3	4	Total
Aggies	7	0	0	0	7
Eagles	7	21	13	0	41

=== At Appalachian State ===
	1	2	3	4	Total
Eagles	7	3	14	0	24
No. 20 Mountaineers	0	7	0	14	21

=== At Troy ===
	1	2	3	4	Total
Eagles	0	14	0	14	28
Trojans	14	13	0	22	49

=== Louisiana–Monroe ===
Week Ten: Louisiana–Monroe Warhawks at Georgia Southern Eagles – Game summary

Quarter	1	2	3	4	Total
Warhawks	7	0	7	15	29
Eagles	7	17	7	20	51

at Paulson Stadium • Statesboro, GA

- Date: November 16
- Game time: 3:00 p.m. EDT
- Game weather: 48° · Wind – N 13 · Overcast, soggy
- Game attendance: 10,266
- Referee: Kyle Olson
- TV: ESPN+

Game information

First quarter

- (11:07) GASO TD – Shai Werts 11-yard rush, Tyler Bass kick
  Georgia Southern 7–0; Drive: 3 plays, 21 yards, 1:14
- (04:56) ULM TD – Austin Vaughn 3-yard rush, Jared Porter kick
  Tied 7–7; Drive: 13 plays, 75 yards, 6:11

Second quarter

- (13:29) GASO FG – Tyler Bass 26-yard field goal
  Georgia Southern 10–7; Drive: 7 plays, 34 yards, 3:00
- (09:00) GASO TD – Shai Werts 24-yard rush, Tyler Bass kick
  Georgia Southern 17–7; Drive: 6 plays, 73 yards, 3:30
- (00:37) GASO TD – Darion Anderson 33-yard pass from Shai Werts, Tyler Bass kick
  Georgia Southern 24–7; Drive: 9 plays, 84 yards, 3:13

Third quarter

- (06:41) ULM TD – Caleb Evans 1-yard rush, Jared Porter kick
  Georgia Southern 24–14; Drive: 8 plays, 84 yards, 3:19
- (00:25) GASO TD – J. D. King 6-yard rush, Tyler Bass kick
  Georgia Southern 31–14; Drive: 2 plays, 6 yards, 0:44

Fourth quarter

- (14:41) GASO TD – Donald Rutledge Jr. 42-yard interception returned, Tyler Bass kick
  Georgia Southern 38–14; Drive: 3 plays, 5 yards, 0:44
- (12:15) ULM TD – Markis McCray 1-yard pass from Caleb Evans, Caleb Evans two-point conversion pass to Josh Pederson
  Georgia Southern 38–22; Drive: 7 plays, 75 yards, 2:26
- (02:48) GASO TD – Wesley Kennedy III 1-yard rush, two-point conversion rush attempt failed
  Georgia Southern 44–22; Drive: 13 plays, 75 yards, 9:27
- (00:20) ULM TD – Josh Pederson 16-yard pass from Caleb Evans, Jared Porter kick
  Georgia Southern 44–29; Drive: 11 plays, 75 yards, 2:28
- (00:13) GASO TD – Monquavion Brinson 42-yard kickoff returned, Tyler Bass kick
  Georgia Southern 51–29; Drive: 0 plays, 0 yards, 0:00

Leading Passers

- ULM – Caleb Evans – 21/36, 285 yards, 2 TD, 2 INT
- GASO – Shai Werts – 5/10, 80 yards, TD

Leading Rushers

- ULM – Josh Johnson – 12 carries, 43 yards
- GASO – J. D. King – 16 carries, 102 yards, TD

Leading Receivers

- ULM – Perry Carter Jr. – 2 receptions, 95 yards
- GASO – Darion Anderson – 1 reception, 33 yards, TD

Statistics	Louisiana–Monroe	Georgia Southern
First downs	18	20
Total yards	370	334
Rushing yards	85	254
Passing yards	285	80
Turnovers	3	0
Time of possession	26:24	33:36

=== At Arkansas State ===
	1	2	3	4	Total
Eagles	3	16	8	6	33
Red Wolves	14	21	3	0	38

=== Georgia State ===
	1	2	3	4	Total
Panthers	7	0	3	0	10
Eagles	7	10	14	7	38

=== Vs. Liberty (Cure Bowl) ===
	1	2	3	4	Total
Flames	7	9	7	0	23
Eagles	0	7	6	3	16

== Players drafted into the NFL ==
Round	Pick	Player	Position	NFL Club
5	163	Kindle Vildor	CB	Chicago Bears
6	188	Tyler Bass	K	Buffalo Bills
