= 2019 Sun Belt Conference Football Championship Game =

- 2nd Sun Belt Championship Game
Louisiana Ragin' Cajuns	Appalachian State Mountaineers
(10–2)	(11–1)
38	45
Head coach: Billy Napier	Head coach: Eliah Drinkwitz
	AP / Coaches / CFP; 20 / 20 / 21
	1	2	3	4	Total
Louisiana	7	10	7	14	38
Appalachian State	21	14	7	3	45
- Date: December 7, 2019
- Season: 2019
- Stadium: Kidd Brewer Stadium
- Location: Boone, NC
- MVP: RB Darrynton Evans, App State
- Favorite: Appalachian State by 5.5
- Referee: Jason Autrey
- Attendance: 18,618

United States TV coverage
- Network: ESPN
- Announcers: Clay Matvick (play-by-play), Ryan Leaf (analyst) and Quint Kessenich (sideline)

2019 Sun Belt Conference football standings
	Conf.			Overall
Team	W		L	W		L
East Division
No. 19 Appalachian State x$	7	–	1	13	–	1
Georgia Southern	5	–	3	7	–	6
Georgia State	4	–	4	7	–	6
Troy	3	–	5	5	–	7
Coastal Carolina	2	–	6	5	–	7
West Division
Louisiana x	7	–	1	11	–	3
Arkansas State	5	–	3	8	–	5
Louisiana–Monroe	4	–	4	5	–	7
Texas State	2	–	6	3	–	9
South Alabama	1	–	7	2	–	10
Championship: Appalachian State 45, Louisiana 38
$ – Conference champion; x – Division champion/co-champions; Rankings from AP Poll

The 2019 Sun Belt Conference Football Championship Game was a college football game played on Saturday, December 7, 2019, at Kidd Brewer Stadium in Boone, North Carolina, to determine the 2019 champion of the Sun Belt Conference. The game, the conference's second championship game, featured the East division champions Appalachian State and the West division champions Louisiana Ragin' Cajuns.

== Previous season ==
The 2018 Sun Belt Conference Football Championship Game featured East Division champion Appalachian State against West Division champion Louisiana Ragin' Cajuns for the first title game for the conference. The Mountaineers defeated the Ragin' Cajuns by a score of 30–19.

== Teams ==
The 2019 Sun Belt Conference Football Championship Game was contested by the Appalachian State Mountaineers, East Division champions, and the Louisiana Ragin' Cajuns, West Division champions. The teams had met 7 times previously, with the Mountaineers holding a 7–0 edge in the series. The teams' most recent meeting was earlier in the 2019 season; Appalachian State won, 17–7. Louisiana had yet to win in the series, since they first met in 2014 This was the teams' second meeting in the Sun Belt Conference Football Championship Game, a rematch from the previous year.

=== Appalachian State ===
Appalachian State clinched its spot in the Championship Game after its November 23 win over Texas State. The Mountaineers secured hosting rights on November 29 with a 48–13 win over Troy. This is Appalachian State's second consecutive and overall appearance in the Championship Game. App State running back Darrynton Evans was named the championship game MVP for the second year in a row.

=== Louisiana ===
The Louisiana Ragin' Cajuns earned their spot after clinching the West Division title on November 23 with a win over Troy. This will be the Ragin' Cajuns' second consecutive and overall appearance in the Championship Game.

== Game summary ==
2019 Sun Belt Conference Football Championship Game

Quarter	1	2	3	4	Total
Louisiana	7	10	7	14	38
No. 21 Appalachian State	21	14	7	3	45

at Kidd Brewer Stadium, Boone, North Carolina

- Date: Saturday, December 7, 2019
- Game time: 12:00 p.m. EST
- Game weather: Sunny and Clear • Temperature: 45 °F (7 °C) • Wind: Light
- Game attendance: 18,618
- Referee: Jason Autrey
- TV announcers (ESPN): Clay Matvick (play-by-play), Ryan Leaf (analyst) and Quint Kessenich (sideline)
- ESPN game summary

Game information

First Quarter

- (13:02) APP – Zac Thomas 58 yard pass to Darrynton Evans, Chandler Staton kick (Drive: 6 plays, 75 yards, 1:58; Appalachian State 7–0)
- (9:38) APP – Darrynton Evans 8 yard rush, Chandler Staton kick (Drive: 5 plays, 47 yards, 2:00; Appalachian State 14–0)
- (1:43) APP – Zac Thomas 5 yard pass to Darrynton Evans, Chandler Staton kick (Drive: 14 plays, 76 yards, 6:42; Appalachian State 21–0)
- (0:25) LA – Levi Lewis 37 yard pass to Peter LaBlanc, Stevie Artigue kick (Drive: 5 plays, 71 yards, 1:12; Appalachian State 21–7)

Second Quarter

- (13:27) APP – Marcus Williams Jr. 29 yard rush, Chandler Staton kick (Drive: 5 plays, 75 yards, 1:58; Appalachian State 28–7)
- (8:13) LA – Levi Lewis 1 yard pass to Elijah Mitchell, Stevie Artigue kick (Drive: 11 plays, 76 yards, 5:14; Appalachian State 28–14)
- (4:13) APP – Daetrich Harrington 25 yard rush, Chandler Staton kick (Drive: 9 plays, 75 yards, 4:00; Appalachian State 35–14)
- (0:03) LA – Stevie Artigue 53 yard field goal (Drive: 7 plays, 37 yards, 1:06; Appalachian State 35–17)

Third Quarter

- (5:57) APP – Josh Thomas 16 yard interception return, Chandler Staton kick (Appalachian State 42–17)
- (2:41) LA – Levi Lewis 2 yard pass to Ja'Mar Bradley, Stevie Artigue kick (Drive: 8 plays, 63 yards, 3:16; Appalachian State 42–24)

Fourth Quarter

- (8:12) APP – Chandler Staton 35 yard field goal (Drive: 8 plays, 43 yards, 4:41; Appalachian State 45–24)
- (4:18) LA – Elijah Mitchell 1 yard rush, Stevie Artigue kick (Drive: 13 plays, 76 yards, 3:54; Appalachian State 45–31)
- (1:19) LA – Levi Lewis 38 yard pass to Peter LaBlanc, Stevie Artigue kick (Drive: 6 plays, 64 yards, 1:09; Appalachian State 45–38)

=== Statistics ===
Statistics	LA	APP
First downs	31	20
Plays–yards	84–513	68–416
Rushes–yards	38–159	51–267
Passing yards	354	149
Passing: comp–att–int	24–46–1	9–17–0
Time of possession	29:49	30:11

Team	Category	Player	Statistics
Louisiana	Passing	Levi Lewis	24/46, 354 yards, 4 TD, 1 INT
Louisiana	Rushing	Elijah Mitchell	18 carries, 85 yards, 1 TD
Louisiana	Receiving	Peter LaBlanc	3 receptions, 118 yards, 2 TD
Appalachian State	Passing	Zac Thomas	9/17, 149 yards, 2 TD
Appalachian State	Rushing	Daetrich Harrington	9 carries, 89 yards, 1 TD
Appalachian State	Receiving	Darrynton Evans	2 receptions, 63 yards, 2 TD

== See also ==
- List of Sun Belt Conference football champions
