= Levi Lewis (American football) =

American football player (born 1998)

James Madison Dukes
- Title: Offensive Intern

Personal information
- Born: May 9, 1998 (age 28); Baton Rouge, Louisiana, U.S.
- Listed height: 5 ft 10 in (1.78 m)
- Listed weight: 184 lb (83 kg)

Career information
- Position: Quarterback
- High school: Scotlandville Magnet (Baton Rouge, Louisiana)
- College: Louisiana (2017–2021)
- NFL draft: 2022: undrafted

Career history

Playing
- Seattle Seahawks (2022)*; Saskatchewan Roughriders (2022); Barcelona Dragons (2024)
- * Offseason or practice squad member only

Coaching
- James Madison (2026–present) Offensive Intern - Wide Receivers

Awards and highlights
- Sun Belt Football Championship MVP (2021); 2× Second-team All-Sun Belt (2020, 2021)

Levi Lewis (born May 9, 1998) is an American former professional football quarterback and coach. Lewis played college football for the Louisiana Ragin' Cajuns where he became the school's all-time leader in passing touchdowns. He is currently an offensive intern working with wide receivers for the James Madison Dukes.

== Early life ==
Lewis attended Scotlandville Magnet High School in Baton Rouge, Louisiana. As a senior, he threw for 2,450 yards and 17 touchdowns while also rushing for 1,577 yards and 23 touchdowns. Lewis committed to play college football at the University of Louisiana Lafayette.

== College career ==
Lewis appeared in four games in his freshman season. After beginning the season as a backup, he made his first career start against South Alabama, completing eight passes for 110 yards and two touchdowns in a 19–14 victory. Lewis finished his freshman season throwing for 377 yards, two touchdowns, and an interception. In his sophomore season, he played in 14 games as a reserve, recording 585 yards passing and seven touchdowns.

Lewis was named the Ragin' Cajuns' starting quarterback entering the 2019 season. He started in 14 games, tallying 3,050 passing yards and 26 touchdowns with 4 interceptions. In the 2020 LendingTree Bowl, Lewis was named the game's MVP after throwing for 246 yards and two touchdowns, leading Louisiana to a 27–17 victory over Miami (OH).

In the 2020 season opener, Lewis led the Ragin' Cajuns to an upset victory over No. 23 Iowa State, giving Louisiana its first win against a ranked team since 1996, when it defeated Texas A&M. He ended the 2020 season with 2,274 yards passing with 19 touchdowns in addition to rushing for 335 yards and five touchdowns.

Lewis returned to Louisiana for a fifth season in 2021. After a loss to No. 21 Texas in the first game of the season, he led the Ragin' Cajuns to 13 consecutive victories and a Sun Belt championship. In the final game of his collegiate career in the New Orleans Bowl, Lewis led Louisiana to a fourth-quarter comeback, earning game MVP honors. He finished his final season throwing for 2,917 yards and 20 touchdowns while rushing for 343 yards and 14 touchdowns.

Lewis ended his career at Louisiana with 74 passing touchdowns, surpassing Jake Delhomme's school record for career touchdown passes.

=== Statistics ===
Season	Team	Games			Passing								Rushing			
Season	Team	GP	GS	Record	Cmp	Att	Pct	Yds	Y/A	TD	Int	Rtg	Att	Yds	Avg	TD
2017	Louisiana	4	3	1–2	28	54	51.9	377	7.0	2	1	119.0	37	175	4.7	1
2018	Louisiana	14	0	—	37	59	62.7	585	9.9	7	2	178.4	25	40	1.6	0
2019	Louisiana	14	14	11–3	243	378	64.3	3,050	8.1	26	4	152.6	69	195	2.8	3
2020	Louisiana	11	11	10–1	177	297	59.6	2,274	7.7	19	7	140.3	55	335	6.1	5
2021	Louisiana	14	14	13–1	236	391	60.4	2,917	7.5	20	4	137.9	100	343	3.4	5
Career		57	42	35−7	721	1,179	61.2	9,203	7.8	74	18	144.4	286	1,088	3.8	14

== Professional career ==
=== Seattle Seahawks ===
Lewis signed with the Seattle Seahawks as an undrafted free agent on April 30, 2022. He was released on May 20, 2022.

=== Saskatchewan Roughriders ===
Lewis signed with the Saskatchewan Roughriders of the CFL on August 29, 2022. On May 17, 2023, Lewis was released by the Roughriders.

=== Barcelona Dragons ===
On February 13, 2024, Lewis signed with the Barcelona Dragons of the European League of Football (ELF).

== Coaching career ==
=== James Madison ===
Lewis joined James Madison in 2026 as an offensive intern working with the wide receivers. The position reunited Lewis with his former Louisiana head coach Billy Napier.
