= Ja'Marcus Bradley =

American football player (born 1996)

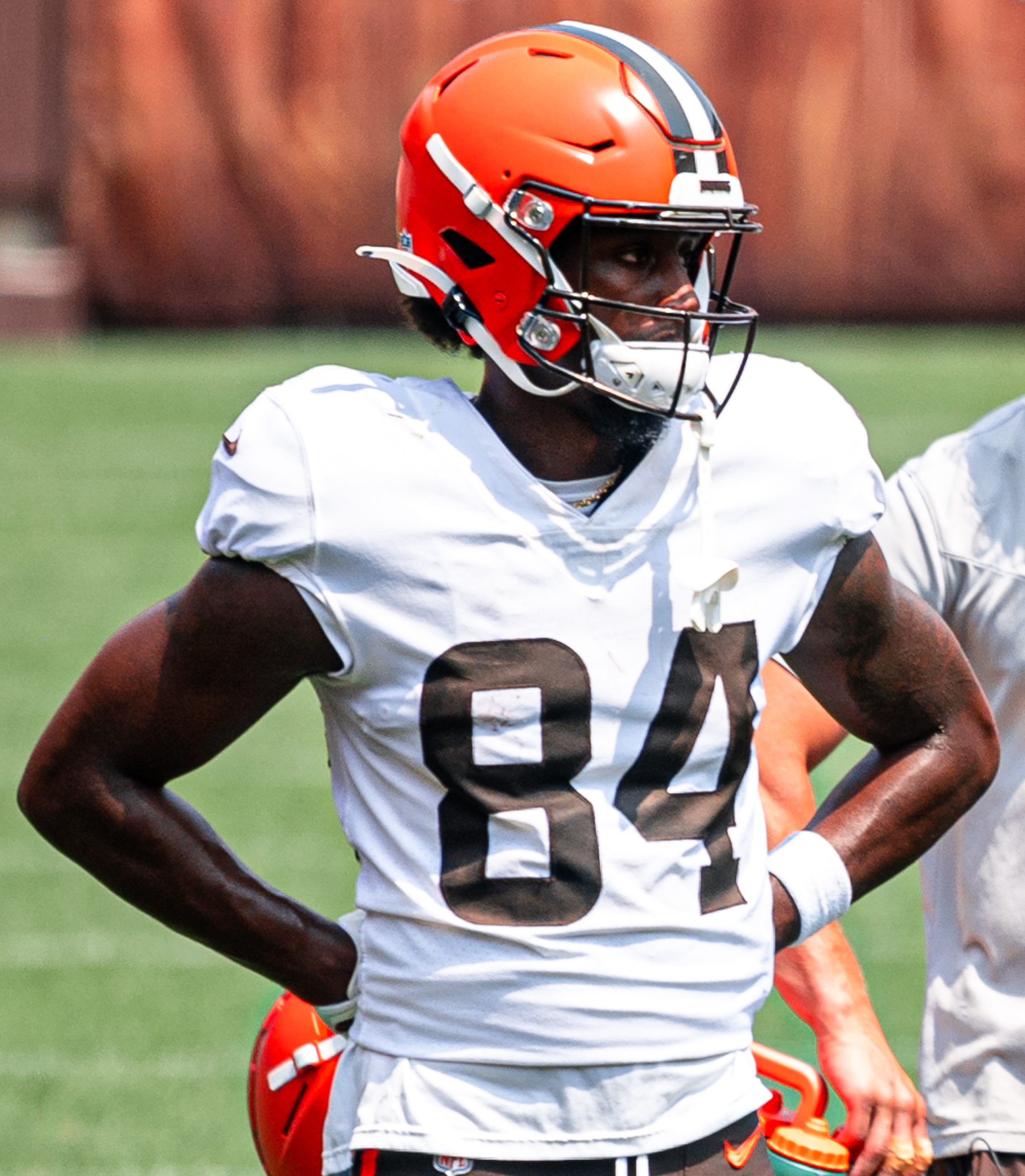
- Bradley with the Cleveland Browns in 2021

Profile
- Position: Wide receiver

Personal information
- Born: December 11, 1996 (age 29); Ackerman, Mississippi, U.S.
- Listed height: 6 ft 1 in (1.85 m)
- Listed weight: 198 lb (90 kg)

Career information
- High school: Choctaw County (Ackerman)
- College: Louisiana (2015–2019)
- NFL draft: 2020: undrafted

Career history
- Cleveland Browns (2020–2022); Pittsburgh Steelers (2022–2023)*; St. Louis Battlehawks (2024); Saskatchewan Roughriders (2024)*
- * Offseason or practice squad member only

Awards and highlights
- Second-team All-Sun Belt (2019); Third-team All-Sun Belt (2018)

Career NFL statistics
- Receptions: 9
- Receiving yards: 124
- Stats at Pro Football Reference

Ja'Marcus Bradley (born December 11, 1996) is an American former professional football player who was a wide receiver in the National Football League (NFL). He played college football for the Louisiana Ragin' Cajuns.

== Early life ==
Bradley grew up in Ackerman, Mississippi, and attended Choctaw County High School. He played quarterback and passed for 1,437 yards and nine touchdowns while also rushing for 2,606 yards on 247 carries with 47 touchdowns as a senior.

== College career ==
Bradley was a member of the Louisiana Ragin' Cajuns for five seasons, redshirting as a true freshman. He was named third-team All-Sun Belt Conference as a redshirt junior after finishing the season with 40 receptions for 608 yards and 10 touchdowns. Bradley was named second-team All-Sun Belt as a redshirt senior after catching 60 passes for 906 yards and 10 touchdowns. Bradley finished his collegiate career fourth in school history with 160 receptions and 2,359 receiving yards and second with 23 touchdown receptions.

== Professional career ==
Pre-draft measurables
Height	Weight	Arm length	Hand span
6 ft 0 3/8 in (1.84 m)	198 lb (90 kg)	32 in (0.81 m)	10 3/8 in (0.26 m)
All values from Pro Day

=== Cleveland Browns ===
Bradley was signed by the Cleveland Browns as an undrafted free agent on April 26, 2020. He was waived during final roster cuts on September 5, 2020, and signed to the team's practice squad two days later. He was elevated to the active roster on December 5, December 14, and December 26 for the team's weeks 13, 14, and 16 games against the Tennessee Titans, Baltimore Ravens, and New York Jets, and reverted to the practice squad after each game. Bradley was elevated again on January 9, 2021, for the team's wild card playoff game against the Pittsburgh Steelers, and reverted to the practice squad again following the game.

Bradley signed a reserve/futures contract with the Browns on January 18, 2021. Bradley was waived by the Browns on August 31, 2021. Bradley was re-signed to the Browns' practice squad on September 1, 2021. Bradley was signed to the Browns' active roster on November 9, 2021. Bradley was waived by the Browns on December 11, 2021, and re-signed to their practice squad on December 14, 2021, but promoted back to the active roster the next day.

The Browns placed an exclusive-rights free agent tender on Bradley on March 7, 2022. Bradley was waived by the Browns on August 29, 2022.

=== Pittsburgh Steelers ===
On November 23, 2022, Bradley was signed to the Pittsburgh Steelers practice squad. He signed a reserve/future contract on January 10, 2023. He was waived/injured on August 8, 2023, and placed on injured reserve. On August 17, was removed from injury reserve with a settlement.

=== St. Louis Battlehawks ===
On December 14, 2023, Bradley was signed by the St. Louis Battlehawks of the XFL, now part of the United Football League. He was placed on Injured reserve on May 29, 2024.

=== Saskatchewan Roughriders ===
On December 12, 2024, Bradley signed with the Saskatchewan Roughriders in the CFL. On May 15, 2025, he was listed as retired.
