= List of Coastal Carolina Chanticleers head football coaches =

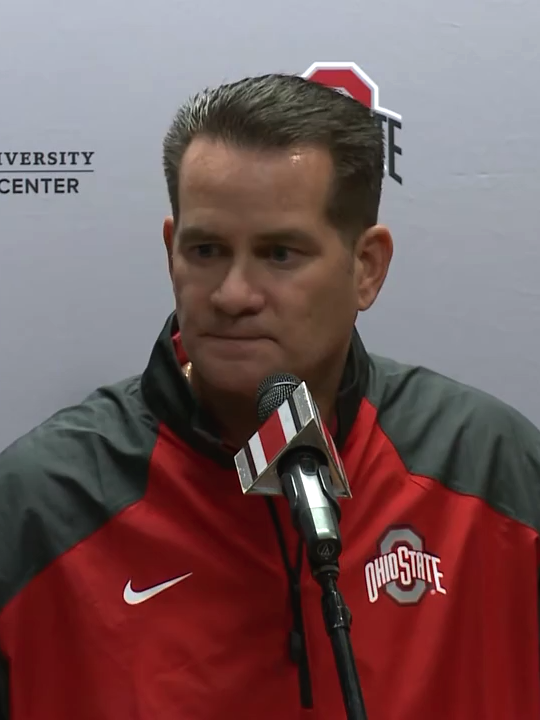
Former head coach Tim Beck

The Coastal Carolina Chanticleers football team represents Coastal Carolina University in college football. The team competes in the East Division of the Sun Belt Conference as part of the NCAA Division I Football Bowl Subdivision. The program has had three head coaches since it began play during the 2003 season. Since the start of the 2019 season, Jamey Chadwell has served as head coach of the Chanticleers. Since December 2022, Tim Beck has served as head coach of the Chanticleers. Since December 2025 Ryan Beard has served as head coach.

As of the conclusion of the 2024 season, the team has played 268 games over 22 seasons. In that time, three coaches have led the Chanticleers in postseason play: David Bennett, Joe Moglia, and Jamey Chadwell. As a member of the FBS, Coastal Carolina made appearances in three bowl game, and also made six appearances in the FCS Playoffs as a member of that division, playing in ten games for an overall postseason record of 5–8. The Chanticleers have won two conference championships and four shared conference championships as a member of the Big South Conference and one as a member of the Sun Belt Conference.

David Bennett was the program's inaugural head coach, and led the program for its first nine years before his dismissal on December 10, 2011. Former TD Ameritrade CEO Joe Moglia was hired as his replacement. The move to hire Moglia was criticized by some as Moglia was struggling through a season as the head coach of the Omaha Nighthawks at the time, and, before his two-year stint as an volunteer assistant coach at Nebraska from 2009 to 2010, he had not held a coaching position since serving as Dartmouth's defensive coordinator in 1983. On July 28, 2017, Moglia announced that he would take a five-month "medical sabbatical" to address a bronchial asthmatic reaction that was causing inflammation in his lungs. He appointed offensive coordinator Jamey Chadwell to lead the program for the 2017 season, and after returning for the 2018 season, Moglia stepped down to serve as the chair of athletics for the program. Chadwell was promoted to head coach on January 18, 2019.

== Key ==
Key to symbols in coaches list
General		Overall		Conference		Postseason (Note: Although the first Rose Bowl Game was played in 1902, it has been continuously played since the 1916 game, and is recognized as the oldest bowl game by the NCAA. "—" indicates any season prior to 1916 when postseason games were not played.)	
No.	Order of coaches (Note: A running total of the number of head coaches, with coaches who served separate tenures being counted only once. Interim head coaches are represented with "Int" and are not counted in the running total. "—" indicates the team played but either without a coach or no coach is on record. "X" indicates an interim year without play.)	GC	Games coached	CW	Conference wins	PW	Postseason wins
DC	Division championships	OW	Overall wins	CL	Conference losses	PL	Postseason losses
CC	Conference championships	OL	Overall losses	CT	Conference ties	PT	Postseason ties
NC	National championships	OT	Overall ties (Note: Overtime rules in college football were introduced in 1996, making ties impossible in the period since.)	C%	Conference winning percentage		
†	Elected to the College Football Hall of Fame	O%	Overall winning percentage (Note: When computing the win–loss percentage, a tie counts as half a win and half a loss.)				

== Coaches ==
List of head football coaches showing season(s) coached, overall records, conference records, postseason records, championships and selected awards (Note: The statistics displayed in the table are correct as of the end of the 2025 NCAA Division I FBS football season.)
No.	Name	Season(s)	GC	OW	OL	OT	O%	CW	CL	CT	C%	PW	PL	PT	DC (Note: Divisional champions have advanced to the Sun Belt Conference Football Championship Game since the institution of divisional play beginning in the 2018 season. Since that time, Coastal Carolina has competed as a member of the East Division of Sun Belt.)	CC	NC	Awards
1	David Bennett	2003–2011	102	63	39	—	0.618	27	16	—	0.628	0	2	—	—	3	0	—
2	Joe Moglia	2012–2016; 2018	78	56	22	—	0.718	19	11	—	0.633	4	4	—	0	3	0	—
3	Jamey Chadwell	2017; 2019–2022	61	39	22	—	0.639	24	16	—	0.600	1	1	—	2	1	0	—
Int.	Chad Staggs	2022	1	0	1	—	.000	0	1	—	.000	0	1	—	0	0	0	—
4	Tim Beck	2023–2025	38	20	18	—	0.526	13	11	—	0.542	1	1	—	0	0	0	—
Int.	Jeremiah Johnson	2025	1	0	1	—	.000	0	0	—	–	0	1	—	0	0	0	—
5	Ryan Beard	2026–Present	0	0	0	—	–	0	0	—	–	0	0	—	0	0	0	—
