= Coastal Carolina–Liberty football rivalry =

American college football rivalry

- Coastal Carolina Chanticleers Liberty Flames
- First meeting: November 14, 2003; Liberty, 38–21
- Latest meeting: September 24, 2026; Liberty, 34–17
- Next meeting: September 18, 2027
- Stadiums: Brooks Stadium; Williams Stadium

Statistics
- Total meetings: 16
- All-time series: Liberty, 9–7
- Largest victory: Liberty, 58–13 (2009)
- Longest win streak: Coastal Carolina, 3 (2004–2006); Liberty, 3 (2007–2009)
- Current win streak: Liberty, 2 (2020–present)

Locations of Coastal Carolina and Liberty

The Coastal Carolina–Liberty football rivalry is an American college football rivalry between the Chanticleers of Coastal Carolina University and the Flames of Liberty University.

== History ==
In 1999, the board of trustees at Coastal Carolina voted to create a new football program with the expectation that its first season would be in 2003. Liberty already had an established football program dating back to the 1970s. At the time of the announcement, both schools were members of the Big South Conference. As the conference did not sponsor football, Liberty played as a Division I FCS independent.

In 2002, the Big South held their inaugural season of football as a conference sponsored sport with Liberty as a participating member.

=== 2000s ===
On November 14, 2003, the two schools met for the first time at Williams Stadium in Lynchburg, Virginia. Despite the Chanticleers leading at halftime, the Flames came back and won the game easily, 38–21.

The Chanticleers and Flames met an additional six times as conference foes in the 2000s, with those games split evenly at three wins each. In 2009, the series saw its largest margin of victory when the Flames defeated the Chanticleers 58–13 on October 17 in Lynchburg. That victory secured the decade series for Liberty, 4–3 over Coastal.

During the eight seasons of Big South football played in the 2000s, the conference title was won or shared by either Coastal or Liberty six times. Coastal won outright titles in 2004 and 2006, along with a shared title with Charleston Southern in 2005. Liberty won outright titles in 2007 and 2008 and shared the title in 2009 with Stony Brook.

=== 2010s ===
The Chanticleers and Flames met seven times in the 2010s, with the rivalry gaining national attention later in the decade. The 2010, 2012, 2013, and 2014 conference titles were all shared by Coastal and Liberty, with 2010 and 2012 also shared with Stony Brook.

Entering the 2013 meeting, the previous six contests had not been close, with the winner prevailing comfortably each time. On October 19, the Chanticleers entered Lynchburg undefeated at 6–0 and ranked No. 6 in the FCS Top 25, while the Flames came into the contest 3–3 overall. The Flames led 28–16 at halftime. After scoring their second touchdown of the third quarter late in the period, the Flames led 42–23 and appeared poised to run away with the game and hand the Chanticleers their first defeat of the season. However, the Chanticleers rallied, beginning with a touchdown to end the third quarter. The Chanticleers’ defense held the Flames to a field goal in the fourth quarter while the offense sparked. With 46 seconds left in regulation, Coastal quarterback Alex Ross threw a touchdown pass to tight end Thomas Pauciello to come within two points. On the two point conversion, Ross connected with wide receiver Bruce Mapp to tie the game and force overtime. Both the Chanticleers and the Flames scored touchdowns in the first overtime period. Coastal kicker Alex Catron then kicked a field goal in the second overtime to take the lead. The Flames were held and forced to attempt a field goal of their own to force a third overtime period. However, Liberty kicker John Lunsford’s attempt was blocked by Coastal wide receiver LaDarius Hawthorne, sealing a 55–52 come from behind double overtime victory for the Chanticleers.

The following season, on November 22, 2014 in Conway, South Carolina, the Chanticleers entered the final game of the regular season at home in Brooks Stadium undefeated and ranked No. 1 in the country. Liberty entered the match 7–4 overall with a 3–1 conference record, needing a win to secure the Big South’s automatic bid to the FCS Playoffs. The Chanticleers led at halftime 14–6, but the Flames came back in the second half to take the lead with 20 seconds left in the fourth quarter on a field goal by kicker John Lunsford. Following a short drive, Coastal kicker Alex Catron lined up for a game-winning 24-yard field goal, but the kick was blocked by Liberty defensive lineman Chima Uzowihe, leading to an upset win for the Flames, 15–14, and reversing the ending that happened the previous season. As a result of the upset, the rivalry broke into the national media, covered by the Associated Press in an article.

Prior to the start of the 2015 football season, it was reported that Liberty was courting both Conference USA and the Sun Belt Conference for an invitation to move its football program to the NCAA Division I Football Bowl Subdivision (FBS). It was also reported that Liberty offered Conference USA $24 million for its admission fee, far above the conference’s fee of $2 million. Ultimately, neither conference extended an invitation to the Flames.

On September 1, 2015, Coastal Carolina announced that it had instead received an invitation from the Sun Belt and had accepted the offer, with the Chanticleers joining the conference as a full member in 2017.

Following the thrilling matches from the previous two seasons, it was announced in August 2015 that the Coastal and Liberty game would be moved to Thursday, November 19, and be aired nationally on ESPNews. The game was the first Big South football game to be played on a Thursday and the first aired on a linear ESPN channel. The game lived up to the hype, as it was a close affair with Coastal leading late in the fourth quarter, 21–17, in Lynchburg. With 1:17 left in the game, Liberty quarterback Josh Woodrum connected on a 40-yard touchdown pass to wide receiver B.J. Farrow to take the lead. The Chanticleers would not respond, resulting in Liberty winning 24–21.

Following the 2015 season, Coastal Carolina began a 2-year transition to the Sun Belt Conference, with the 2016 season being played as an FCS independent. The Chanticleers and Flames met on November 17, 2016, a Thursday night, in a nationally televised game for the second consecutive season. The Chanticleers entered the match at 9–1 and ranked No. 16. The Flames were 6–4. This matchup was an oddity, as the Chanticleers, as a result of injuries, had to play six different quarterbacks during the season. The starting quarterback for the Chanticleers in the game was Tyler Chadwick, who was an infielder for the Chanticleer baseball team, the defending College World Series national champions. Despite the Chanticleers' quarterback situation, the Flames suffered their largest defeat of the series, 42–7, in Conway. .

Liberty would share the Big South title with Charleston Southern in 2016.

In February of 2017, it was announced that Liberty successfully petitioned the NCAA for a waiver to follow Coastal and transition to the FBS as an independent, with their first FBS season being in 2018.

The Chanticleers won the decade series 4–3 tying it up at seven wins each.

=== 2020s ===
Due to the COVID-19 pandemic, many teams’ schedules had to become fluid for the 2020 season. On August 19, it was announced that the Chanticleers and Flames were to meet on December 5 in Conway. Leading up to the game, both teams were having stellar seasons. Liberty, led by future NFL quarterback Malik Willis, spent a few weeks ranked in the Top 25 and were coming into the match 9–1, with their lone loss being a one point defeat to NC State. Coastal Carolina, on the other hand, was undefeated and ranked No. 18 in the country. As a result, ESPN scheduled that week’s broadcast of College GameDay to be aired from Conway before the game. This was to be the first meeting between these former FCS conference foes as FBS teams. However, several days before the game was to be played, Liberty announced they had to cancel the game due to a COVID-19 outbreak on the team. Miraculously, BYU offered to fly in from Utah on short notice to play the Chanticleers. Both teams were undefeated, with BYU ranked No. 13. The game was coined Mormons vs. Mullets, with the Chanticleers winning 22–17.

After the conclusion of the regular season, it was announced that the Chanticleers and Flames would meet after all in the 2020 season, as both teams were invited to play in the Cure Bowl at Camping World Stadium in Orlando, Florida. This is the only Cure Bowl played to feature two ranked teams. The Flames entered the match ranked No. 23, while the Chanticleers were ranked No. 9 and still undefeated. As with previous anticipated matches, the final result was close. The Flames took the early advantage, with the Chanticleers fighting back to tie it in the fourth quarter. Liberty was poised to score the go ahead touchdown with 40 seconds left in regulation. However, running back Joshua Mack fumbled the ball at the 1 yard line, which was recovered by Coastal to force overtime. In the first overtime period, the Flames kicked a field goal to take the lead. The Chanticleers failed to score the winning touchdown and had to kick their own field goal. Coastal kicker Massimo Biscardi attempted the 42-yard field goal. Reminiscent of the 2014 matchup, Liberty’s Elijah James blocked the kick, sealing the 37–34 win for the Flames as they prevented the Chanticleers from having an undefeated season again.

Following the 2022 season, Coastal Carolina head coach Jamey Chadwell was one of the hottest names in the coaching carousel as he amassed a 31–5 record over the previous three seasons with the Chanticleers. One of the strongest rumored suitors for Chadwell was the Nebraska Cornhuskers. However, Nebraska hired Matt Rhule instead. Following Rhule’s hiring, buzz began to swirl that Chadwell might replace Hugh Freeze at Liberty, as Freeze had left to take the head coaching job at Auburn. On December 4, 2022, it was announced that Liberty had hired Chadwell away from the Chanticleers to lead the Flames.

The 2026 matchup in the series took place on Thursday, September 24, and was the fourth consecutive nationally televised game in the series, airing on the main ESPN channel. This was also the third consecutive regular season meeting in the series to be played on a Thursday night. Leading up to the game, it was announced that ESPN's SportsCenter on Campus would air from Conway beforehand. The segment brought ESPN's flagship SportsCenter program to the campus, with sports anchor Matt Barrie and former NFL quarterback Chase Daniel hosting. This matchup marked Jamey Chadwell's first return to Coastal Carolina since leaving the program to become head coach at Liberty in 2022.

Liberty entered the game with a 2–1 record, while Coastal Carolina entered with a 1–2 record. The Chanticleers took a 17–10 lead into halftime after scoring 14 points on their final two drives of the first half, including a diving touchdown catch by Tristian Gardener with 24 seconds remaining. However, Liberty dominated the second half, scoring 24 unanswered points. Deshawn Purdie threw for 216 yards and two touchdowns, while Kam Davis rushed for 166 yards and a touchdown. Purdie's longest pass of the day came by way of a 58–yard touchdown pass to Makai Jackson, who finished the game with 149 receiving yards and two touchdowns. Liberty took the lead for good after a 8–yard touchdown run on fourth down by former Coastal Carolina quarterback, Ethan Vasko. The Flames' defense held the Chanticleers scoreless in the second half and did not surrender a fourth quarter point for the fourth consecutive game, securing a 34–17 victory and giving Liberty its third straight win of the season.

==== Future matchups ====
Coastal Carolina and Liberty will play each other every season from 2026 to 2030, with three games in Conway and two games in Lynchburg. The games in Conway will take place in 2026, 2028, and 2030. The games in Lynchburg will be in 2027 and 2029.

== Game History ==
Coastal Carolina victories	Liberty victories

No.	Date	Location	Winner	Score
1	November 14, 2003	Lynchburg, VA	Liberty	38–21
2	October 23, 2004	Conway, SC	Coastal Carolina	21–14
3	October 22, 2005	Lynchburg, VA	Coastal Carolina	27–21^{3OT}
4	October 28, 2006	Conway, SC	Coastal Carolina	28–26
5	October 27, 2007	Lynchburg, VA	Liberty	37–24
6	October 4, 2008	Conway, SC	Liberty	43–38
7	October 17, 2009	Lynchburg, VA	Liberty	58–13
8	November 13, 2010	Conway, SC	Coastal Carolina	45–31
9	October 15, 2011	Lynchburg, VA	Liberty	63–27

No.	Date	Location	Winner	Score
10	October 27, 2012	Conway, SC	Coastal Carolina	36–12
11	October 19, 2013	Lynchburg, VA	Coastal Carolina	55–52^{2OT}
12	November 22, 2014	Conway, SC	Liberty	15–14
13	November 19, 2015	Lynchburg, VA	Liberty	24–21
14	November 17, 2016	Conway, SC	Coastal Carolina	42–7
15	December 26, 2020	Orlando, FL	Liberty	37–34^{OT}
16	September 24, 2026	Conway, SC	Liberty	34–17
Series: Liberty leads 9–7

== Coaching records ==
Coastal Carolina
David Bennett	4–5
Joe Moglia	3–2
Jamey Chadwell	0–1
Ryan Beard	0–1

Liberty
Ken Karcher	1–2
Danny Rocco	4–2
Turner Gill	2–3
Hugh Freeze	1–0
Jamey Chadwell	1–0

== See also ==
- List of NCAA college football rivalry games
