= 2004 Big South Conference football season =

- League: NCAA Division I FCS
- Sport: Football
- Duration: September 4–November 20, 2004
- Number of teams: 5
- Total attendance: 157,465
- Conference champions: Coastal Carolina Chanticleers

Big South Conference football seasons
- ← 2003 2005 →

2004 Big South Conference football standings
	Conf.			Overall
Team	W		L	W		L
No. 24 Coastal Carolina $	4	–	0	10	–	1
Liberty	3	–	1	6	–	5
Gardner–Webb	2	–	2	5	–	6
Charleston Southern	1	–	3	5	–	5
VMI	0	–	4	0	–	11
$ – Conference champion; Rankings from The Sports Network poll

The 2004 Big South Conference football season was the third football season for the Big South Conference. The season began on Saturday, September 4, 2004 and concluded on November 20. The Coastal Carolina Chanticleers won the conference's regular season championship, their first title.

== Awards and honors ==
=== Conference honors ===
- Offensive Player of the Year: Patrick Hall, Jr., RB, Coastal Carolina
- Defensive Player of the Year: Harold Wells, Sr., DL, Gardner–Webb
- Freshman of the Year: Jerome Simpson, WR, Coastal Carolina
- Scholar-Athlete of the Year: Adam DeGraffenreid, Jr., DE, Charleston Southern
- Coach of the Year: David Bennett, Coastal Carolina

=== All-Conference Teams ===
Position	Player	Class	Team
First Team Offense
QB	Collin Drafts	So.	Charleston Southern
RB	Patrick Hall	Jr.	Coastal Carolina
RB	Sam Gado	Sr.	Liberty
WR	Eddie Gadson	R–Fr.	Charleston Southern
WR	Harry Seabrook	Sr.	Charleston Southern
WR	Kory Alston	So.	Gardner–Webb
WR	Zohn Burden	Jr.	VMI
TE	Brandon Jeffcoat	Sr.	Coastal Carolina
OL	Antwon Trice	R–Jr.	Coastal Carolina
OL	Nick Johnson	Sr.	Coastal Carolina
OL	Ryam Smith	Sr.	Gardner–Webb
OL	Sean Boyle	Sr.	Liberty
OL	Thomas Smith	Sr.	Liberty
First Team Defense
DL	Kelvin McIver	Jr.	Coastal Carolina
DL	Harold Wells	Sr.	Gardner–Webb
DL	Seth Reichert	Sr.	Liberty
DL	Brandon Schweitzer	Jr.	Gardner–Webb
LB	Keppy Baucom	Jr.	Gardner–Webb
LB	Maurice Simpkins	Jr.	Coastal Carolina
LB	Nick Vaughn	R–Sr.	Liberty
LB	Justin Huggard	Jr.	VMI
DB	Robert Mason	Jr.	VMI
DB	Quinton Teal	Jr.	Coastal Carolina
DB	Allen Davis	Sr.	Gardner–Webb
DB	Mario Williams	Sr.	Gardner–Webb
First Team Special Teams
PK	Josh Hoke	So.	Coastal Carolina
P	Graham Whitlock	Jr.	Gardner–Webb
LS	Ross Booth	Sr.	VMI
RS	Ralphell Goodson	Sr.	Gardner–Webb

Position	Player	Class	Team
Second Team Offense
QB	Nick Roberts	Jr.	Gardner–Webb
RB	Dre Barnes	Sr.	Liberty
RB	Sean Mizzer	Jr.	VMI
WR	Jerome Simpson	Fr.	Coastal Carolina
WR	Maurice Price	Fr.	Charleston Southern
WR	Aaron Richardson	So.	Gardner–Webb
WR	Vonzell Pittman	So.	Gardner–Webb
TE	Stephen Knorr	Sr.	Gardner–Webb
OL	Jonathan Parra	Sr.	Charleston Southern
OL	Brad Poston	So.	Coastal Carolina
OL	C. J. Brown	Jr.	Gardner–Webb
OL	Markus Ferguson	R–Jr.	Liberty
OL	Jeremy Ward	Jr.	VMI
Second Team Defense
DL	Adam DeGraffenreid	Jr.	Charleston Southern
DL	Adrain Grady	So.	Coastal Carolina
DL	Sam Harper	So.	Coastal Carolina
DL	Bryan Thornburg	Sr.	Gardner–Webb
LB	Bowe Butler	Sr.	Charleston Southern
LB	Jada Ross	R–Fr.	Charleston Southern
LB	Tavoris Horton	Sr.	Gardner–Webb
LB	Todd Baldwin	Jr.	VMI
DB	Tavares Shorter	Jr.	Charleston Southern
DB	Greg Williamson	Sr.	Coastal Carolina
DB	C. J. Moore	R–Jr.	Liberty
DB	Erick Harris	Sr.	Liberty
First Team Special Teams
PK	Hunter Smith	So.	Gardner–Webb
P	Noah Crouch	R–Jr.	Liberty
LS	Jake Neal	Sr.	Gardner–Webb
RS	David Parker	So.	Coastal Carolina

== Rankings ==
Legend
Increase in ranking
Decrease in ranking
Not ranked previous week

		Pre	Wk 1	Wk 2	Wk 3	Wk 4	Wk 5	Wk 6	Wk 7	Wk 8	Wk 9	Wk 10	Wk 11	Wk 12	Final
Charleston Southern	TSN	–	–	–	–	–	–	–	–	–	–	–	–	–	–
Charleston Southern	C	–	–	–	–	–	–	–	–	–	–	–	–	–	–
Coastal Carolina	TSN	–	–	–	–	–	–	–	–	RV	RV	24	21	22	24
Coastal Carolina	C	–	–	–	–	–	–	–	–	RV	RV	RV	23	25	24
Gardner–Webb	TSN	RV	RV	RV	RV	–	–	–	–	–	–	–	–	–	–
Gardner–Webb	C	RV	–	RV	–	RV	–	–	–	–	–	–	–	–	–
Liberty	TSN	–	–	–	–	–	RV	–	–	–	–	–	–	–	–
Liberty	C	–	–	–	–	–	–	–	–	–	–	–	–	–	–
VMI	TSN	RV	–	–	–	–	–	–	–	–	–	–	–	–	–
VMI	C	–	–	–	–	–	–	–	–	–	–	–	–	–	–

== Head coaches ==
Jay Mills, Charleston Southern
David Bennett, Coastal Carolina
Steve Patton, Gardner–Webb
Ken Karcher, Liberty
Cal McCombs, VMI
