= 2003 Big South Conference football season =

- League: NCAA Division I FCS
- Sport: Football
- Duration: August 30–November 22, 2003
- Number of teams: 5
- Total attendance: 140,593
- Conference champions: Gardner–Webb

Big South Conference football seasons
- ← 2002 2004 →

2003 Big South Conference football standings
	Conf.			Overall
Team	W		L	W		L
Gardner–Webb $	4	–	0	8	–	4
Liberty	3	–	1	6	–	6
VMI	2	–	2	6	–	6
Coastal Carolina	1	–	3	6	–	5
Charleston Southern	0	–	4	1	–	11
$ – Conference champion

The 2003 Big South Conference football season was the second football season for the Big South Conference. The season began on Saturday, August 30, 2003 and concluded on November 22. The Gardner–Webb Runnin' Bulldogs won the conference's regular season championship, their second consecutive title.

== Awards and honors ==
=== Conference honors ===
- Offensive Player of the Year: Dre Barnes, Jr., RB, Liberty
- Defensive Player of the Year: Mario Williams, Jr., FS, Gardner–Webb
- Freshman of the Year: Jonna Lee, LB, Charleston Southern
- Co-Scholar-Athlete of the Year: Jim Maxwell, Sr., LB, Gardner–Webb & Matt Sharpe, Sr., K, VMI
- Coach of the Year: Steve Patton, Gardner–Webb

=== All-Conference Teams ===
Position	Player	Class	Team
First Team Offense
QB	Nick Roberts	So.	Gardner–Webb
RB	Dre Barnes	Jr.	Liberty
RB	Sean Mizzer	So.	VMI
WR	William Andrews	Jr.	Gardner–Webb
WR	Aaron Dunklin	Sr.	Charleston Southern
WR	Lauren Williams	R–So.	Liberty
TE	Danny McCoy	Sr.	Charleston Southern
OL	Jamie Pridgen	Sr.	Gardner–Webb
OL	Ryan Smith	Jr.	Gardner–Webb
OL	Sam Brown	Sr.	VMI
OL	Tom Smith	Jr.	Liberty
OL	Clarence Wright	Sr.	Charleston Southern
First Team Defense
DL	Aaron DeBerry	Sr.	Liberty
DL	Vichael Foxx	Jr.	VMI
DL	Jason Threat	Sr.	Gardner–Webb
DL	Harold Wells	Jr.	Gardner–Webb
LB	Jim Maxwell	Sr.	Gardner–Webb
LB	Derik Screen	Sr.	VMI
LB	Maurice Simpkins	Jr.	Coastal Carolina
LB	Jonna Lee	Fr.	Charleston Southern
DB	Mario Williams	Jr.	Gardner–Webb
DB	Musa Sarki	Sr.	VMI
DB	Aaron Sykes	Sr.	Gardner–Webb
DB	C.J. Moore	R–So.	Liberty
First Team Special Teams
PK	Matt Sharpe	Sr.	VMI
P	Graham Whitlock	Jr.	Gardner–Webb
LS	Marlon Roman	Jr.	Liberty
RS	Greg Williamson	Jr.	Coastal Carolina

== Rankings ==
Legend
Increase in ranking
Decrease in ranking
Not ranked previous week

		Pre	Wk 1	Wk 2	Wk 3	Wk 4	Wk 5	Wk 6	Wk 7	Wk 8	Wk 9	Wk 10	Wk 11	Wk 12	Final
Charleston Southern	TSN	–	–	–	–	–	–	–	–	–	–	–	–	–	–
Charleston Southern	C	–	–	–	–	–	–	–	–	–	–	–	–	–	–
Coastal Carolina	TSN	–	–	–	–	–	–	–	–	–	–	–	–	–	–
Coastal Carolina	C	–	–	–	–	–	–	–	–	–	–	–	–	–	–
Gardner–Webb	TSN	–	–	–	–	–	–	–	–	–	–	–	–	–	–
Gardner–Webb	C	25	–	–	–	–	–	–	–	–	–	–	–	–	–
Liberty	TSN	–	–	–	–	–	–	–	–	–	–	–	–	–	–
Liberty	C	–	–	–	–	–	–	–	–	–	–	–	–	–	–
VMI	TSN	–	–	–	–	–	–	–	–	–	–	–	–	–	–
VMI	C	–	–	–	–	–	–	–	–	–	–	–	–	–	–

== Regular season ==
Index to colors and formatting
Big South member won
Big South member lost
Big South teams in **bold**

All times Eastern time.

=== Week One ===
Date	Time	Visiting team	Home team	Site	Result	Reference
August 30	1:30 PM	**VMI**	Navy	Navy–Marine Corps Memorial Stadium • Annapolis, MD	**L** 10–37	
August 30	3:30 PM	**Charleston Southern**	The Citadel	Johnson Hagood Stadium • Charleston, SC	**L** 10–64	
August 30	6:00 PM	**Liberty**	James Madison	Bridgeforth Stadium • Harrisonburg, VA	**L** 6–48	
August 30	6:00 PM	Clark Atlanta	**Gardner–Webb**	Spangler Stadium • Boiling Springs, NC	**W** 45–0	

=== Week Two ===
Date	Time	Visiting team	Home team	Site	Result	Reference
September 6	1:00 PM	**VMI**	Davidson	Richardson Stadium • Davidson, NC	**W** 31–9	
September 6	1:30 PM	**Charleston Southern**	Wingate	Irwin Belk Stadium • Wingate, NC	**L** 6–22	
September 6	3:00 PM	**Gardner–Webb**	Montana State	Bobcat Stadium • Bozeman, MT	**L** 3–28	
September 6	7:00 PM	Newberry	**Coastal Carolina**	Brooks Stadium • Conway, SC	**W** 21–14	
September 6	7:00 PM	**Liberty**	Toledo	Glass Bowl • Toledo, OH	**L** 3–49	

=== Week Three ===
Date	Time	Visiting team	Home team	Site	Result	Reference
September 13	1:00 PM	William & Mary	**VMI**	Alumni Memorial Field • Lexington, VA	**L** 24–34	
September 13	1:30 PM	Presbyterian	**Charleston Southern**	Buccaneer Field • North Charleston, SC	**L** 14–17	
September 13	6:00 PM	Webber International	**Gardner–Webb**	Spangler Stadium • Boiling Springs, NC	**W** 52–10	
September 13	6:00 PM	**Liberty**	Bowling Green	Doyt Perry Stadium • Bowling Green, OH	**L** 3–62	
September 13	7:00 PM	Morehead State	**Coastal Carolina**	Brooks Stadium • Conway, SC	**L** 6–31	

=== Week Four ===
Date	Time	Visiting team	Home team	Site	Result	Reference
September 20	12:30 PM	**Coastal Carolina**	Jacksonville	D. B. Milne Field • Jacksonville, FL	**L** 9–14	
September 20	1:00 PM	Norfolk State	**VMI**	Alumni Memorial Field • Lexington, VA	**W** 34–9	
September 20	1:30 PM	West Virginia State	**Charleston Southern**	Buccaneer Field • North Charleston, SC	**W** 49–42	
September 20	1:30 PM	Kentucky Wesleyan	**Liberty**	Williams Stadium • Lynchburg, VA	**W** 47–7	
September 20	6:00 PM	Chattanooga	**Gardner–Webb**	Spangler Stadium • Boiling Springs, NC	**W** 23–13	

=== Week Five ===
Date	Time	Visiting team	Home team	Site	Result	Reference
September 25	6:00 PM	**Coastal Carolina**	North Greenville	Younts Stadium • Tigerville, SC	**W** 39–19	
September 27	1:00 PM	Georgetown	**VMI**	Alumni Memorial Field • Lexington, VA	**W** 42–14	
September 27	1:30 PM	Tusculum	**Charleston Southern**	Buccaneer Field • North Charleston, SC	**L** 7–58	
September 27	2:00 PM	**Gardner–Webb**	Furman	Paladin Stadium • Greenville, SC	**L** 0–45	
September 27	7:00 PM	Youngstown State	**Liberty**	Williams Stadium • Lynchburg, VA	**L** 3–34	

=== Week Six ===
Date	Time	Visiting team	Home team	Site	Result	Reference
October 4	7:00 PM	**Gardner–Webb**	**Coastal Carolina**	Brooks Stadium • Conway, SC	**GW** 38–17	
October 4	7:00 PM	**VMI**	**Liberty**	Williams Stadium • Lynchburg, VA	**Lib** 31–28	

=== Week Seven ===
Date	Time	Visiting team	Home team	Site	Result	Reference
October 11	1:00 PM	**Charleston Southern**	**VMI**	Alumni Memorial Field • Lexington, VA	**VMI** 50–7	
October 11	3:30 PM	**Liberty**	**Gardner–Webb**	Spangler Stadium • Boiling Springs, NC	**GW** 27–17	
October 11	7:00 PM	Charleston (WV)	**Coastal Carolina**	Brooks Stadium • Conway, SC	**W** 47–7	

=== Week Eight ===
Date	Time	Visiting team	Home team	Site	Result	Reference
October 18	1:00 PM	**Gardner–Webb**	**VMI**	Alumni Memorial Field • Lexington, VA	**GW** 37–25	
October 18	2:00 PM	**Liberty**	East Tennessee State	Memorial Center • Johnson City, TN	**L** 23–33	
October 18	7:00 PM	**Charleston Southern**	South Florida	Raymond James Stadium • Tampa, FL	**L** 7–55	

=== Week Nine ===
Date	Time	Visiting team	Home team	Site	Result	Reference
October 25	1:30 PM	North Greenville	**Charleston Southern**	Buccaneer Field • North Charleston, SC	**L** 21–49	
October 25	3:00 PM	**VMI**	Richmond	City Stadium • Richmond, VA	**L** 25–35	
October 25	4:00 PM	**Coastal Carolina**	Savannah State	Ted Wright Stadium • Savannah, GA	**W** 29–19	

=== Week Ten ===
Date	Time	Visiting team	Home team	Site	Result	Reference
November 1	12:00 PM	**Liberty**	**Charleston Southern**	Buccaneer Field • North Charleston, SC	**Lib** 17–6	
November 1	12:30 PM	**VMI**	**Coastal Carolina**	Brooks Stadium • Conway, SC	**VMI** 19–10	
November 1	4:00 PM	**Gardner–Webb**	Florida Atlantic	Lockhart Stadium • Fort Lauderdale, FL	**L** 26–31	

=== Week Eleven ===
Date	Time	Visiting team	Home team	Site	Result	Reference
November 8	1:00 PM	**Coastal Carolina**	Davidson	Richardson Stadium • Davidson, NC	**W** 52–27	
November 8	1:00 PM	Austin Peay	**VMI**	Alumni Memorial Field • Lexington, VA	**W** 48–7	
November 8	1:30 PM	**Charleston Southern**	**Gardner–Webb**	Spangler Stadium • Boiling Springs, NC	**GW** 46–0	
November 8	1:30 PM	Norfolk State	**Liberty**	Williams Stadium • Lynchburg, VA	**W** 69–21	

=== Week Twelve ===
Date	Time	Visiting team	Home team	Site	Result	Reference
November 15	1:30 PM	**VMI**	The Citadel	American Legion Memorial Stadium • Charlotte, NC	**L** 23–27	
November 15	1:30 PM	**Charleston Southern**	James Madison	Bridgeforth Stadium • Harrisonburg, VA	**L** 7–45	
November 15	1:30 PM	Florida Atlantic	**Gardner–Webb**	Spangler Stadium • Boiling Springs, NC	**W** 22–19	
November 15	1:30 PM	**Coastal Carolina**	**Liberty**	Williams Stadium • Lynchburg, VA	**Lib** 38–21	

=== Week Thirteen ===
Date	Time	Visiting team	Home team	Site	Result	Reference
November 22	1:30 PM	Hofstra	**Liberty**	Williams Stadium • Lynchburg, VA	**W** 49–42 (OT)	
November 22	1:30 PM	**Coastal Carolina**	**Charleston Southern**	Buccaneer Field • North Charleston, SC	**CCU** 48–14	
November 22	2:00 PM	**Gardner–Webb**	Western Carolina	E. J. Whitmire Stadium • Cullowhee, NC	**L** 16–39	

== Head coaches ==
Jay Mills, Charleston Southern
David Bennett, Coastal Carolina
Steve Patton, Gardner–Webb
Ken Karcher, Liberty
Cal McCombs, VMI
