= Carolina football =

Carolina football most commonly refers to:

- Carolina Panthers, National Football League franchise in Charlotte, North Carolina
- North Carolina Tar Heels football, college football team in Chapel Hill, North Carolina
- South Carolina Gamecocks football, college football team in Columbia, South Carolina

Carolina football may also refer to:

- Coastal Carolina Chantacleers football, college football team Conway, South Carolina
- East Carolina Pirates football, college football team in Greenville, North Carolina
- Western Carolina Catamounts football, college football team in Cullowhee, North Carolina
