= Samkon Gado =

American football player (born 1982)

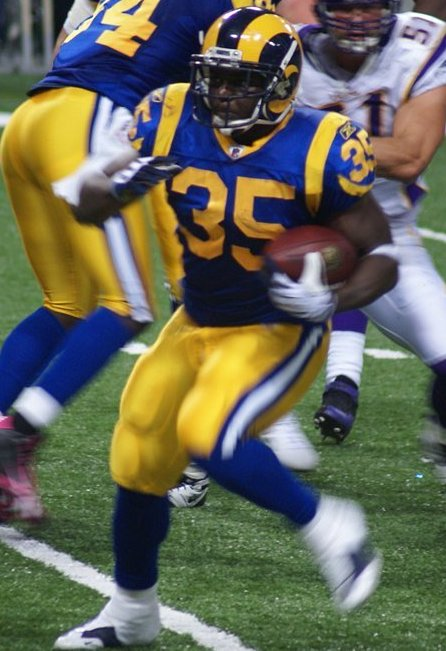
- Gado with the St. Louis Rams in 2009

No. 35, 27, 38
- Position: Running back

Personal information
- Born: November 13, 1982 (age 43); Kufai, Gombe State, Nigeria
- Listed height: 5 ft 10 in (1.78 m)
- Listed weight: 225 lb (102 kg)

Career information
- High school: Ben Lippen (Columbia, South Carolina, U.S.)
- College: Liberty (2001–2004)
- NFL draft: 2005: undrafted

Career history
- Kansas City Chiefs (2005)*; Green Bay Packers (2005–2006); Houston Texans (2006–2007); Miami Dolphins (2007); St. Louis Rams (2008–2009); Tennessee Titans (2010)*
- * Offseason or practice squad member only

Awards and highlights
- All-Big South (2004)

Career NFL statistics
- Rushing attempts: 268
- Rushing yards: 972
- Rushing touchdowns: 11
- Receptions: 43
- Receiving yards: 292
- Receiving touchdowns: 1
- Stats at Pro Football Reference

Samkon Kaltho Gado (born November 13, 1982) is a Nigerian-American otolaryngologist. He is a former professional football running back in the National Football League (NFL) for the Green Bay Packers, Houston Texans, Miami Dolphins, and St. Louis Rams. He played college football at Liberty. He was signed by the Kansas City Chiefs as an undrafted free agent in 2005.

== Early life and education ==
Born in Kufai, Gombe State, Nigeria, his first name (Samkon) means "truth" in the Tangale language, and his last name means "inheritance". His family moved from Kufai to Wheaton, Illinois, when Gado was half a year old; his father attended Wheaton College during that time. They returned to Nigeria when Samkon was two years old. After moving back to Nigeria, his father migrated again in 1990 to earn a doctorate degree in divinity at Columbia International University. A church in South Carolina made a financial contribution a year later so that Gado and his mother could also travel to North America.

He attended Ben Lippen School in Columbia, South Carolina, and lettered in football, basketball and baseball, earning all-state honors in football.

== College career ==
Gado accepted a football scholarship from Liberty University, a then-Division I-AA school in Lynchburg, Virginia. He served mostly as a third-string running back, starting only two games during his tenure with the Flames. Injuries to two teammates, Eugene Goodman and Dre Barnes, saw Gado receive his largest amount of playing time as a senior after initially planning to redshirt. He wound up making the All-Big South team at the end of the season.

== Professional career ==
=== Kansas City Chiefs ===
After going undrafted in the 2005 NFL draft, Gado was signed by the Kansas City Chiefs in May after Liberty's Ken Karcher recommended him to Chiefs offensive coordinator Al Saunders. He didn't play in the preseason because of a neck injury and was waived on August 29. He was signed to the practice squad on September 5 and was released again on October 4.

=== Green Bay Packers ===
On October 17, 2005, Gado was signed by the Green Bay Packers to the team's practice squad after running 4.43-second 40-yard dash in front of their scouts. On October 28, he was promoted to the active roster after Ahman Green ruptured his quadriceps tendon, Najeh Davenport broke his ankle and Tony Fisher fractured his first rib. He made his NFL debut the next day against the Cincinnati Bengals, recording one carry for eight yards. On November 6, 2005, ReShard Lee fumbled on his second carry against the Pittsburgh Steelers and was benched for the rest of the game. As Lee's sub, Gado registered over 20 carries during the game.

On November 13, 2005, Gado started his first NFL game against the Atlanta Falcons. In the game, he rushed for over 100 yards and two touchdowns, and also caught a touchdown, leading to him being named NFC Offensive Rookie of the Week for Week 10. Gado's three-touchdown game was the first by a Packer rookie since James Lofton in 1978.

In the Week 14 game against the Detroit Lions, his third 100-yard effort of the season, Gado rushed for 171 yards against the Detroit Lions, a rookie record for the Packers, including a 64-yard touchdown run, while once again being given the Rookie of the Week award. A torn right medial collateral ligament, suffered late in the first quarter against the Baltimore Ravens on December 18, landed Gado on injured reserve.

In 2006, Mike Sherman was fired and replaced with Mike McCarthy as the new head coach. During training camp, Gado suffered a minor groin injury but did not miss significant time. After an injury to William Henderson, Gado switched to a temporary fullback role. On September 12, 2006, after the first week of the NFL regular season, Gado was traded to the Houston Texans in exchange for running back Vernand Morency.

=== Houston Texans ===
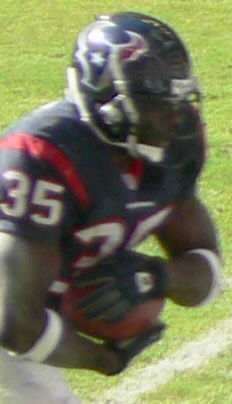
Gado in 2006

In 2006, he reunited with former Packers coach Mike Sherman who was coaching the Texans offensive line. He was a backup behind Ron Dayne and Wali Lundy. Against the Jacksonville Jaguars in November 2006, Gado picked up a key fourth-quarter fourth down conversion to secure a 13-10 Texans win.

In 2007, the Texans added free agent running back Ahman Green. Gado made the team over Lundy, playing in three games as a backup, while registering 18 carries for 46 yards and one touchdown. On October 23, 2007, the Texans released Gado after promoting running back Adimchinobi Echemandu from the practice squad.

=== Miami Dolphins ===
Shortly before Gado's release from Houston, the Miami Dolphins lost starting running back Ronnie Brown to a torn ACL, and the team subsequently claimed Gado off waivers in late October. He was cut by the team in favor of Ricky Williams on November 26, but after Williams suffered a season-ending injury that same day, Gado was re-signed to the active roster on November 28. He scored a pair of touchdowns during December.

Gado, a restricted free agent in the 2008 offseason, was not tendered a contract by the team.

=== St. Louis Rams ===
Gado was signed by the St. Louis Rams on November 4, 2008, after wide receivers Drew Bennett and Dante Hall were placed on injured reserve. After playing in one game and being inactive for one game, he was released on November 19.

Gado was re-signed by the Rams for the 2009 training camp, where he sustained a rib injury in a preseason game against the Kansas City Chiefs. He survived final roster cuts and spent the season as a reserve running back.

=== Tennessee Titans ===
On August 17, 2010, Gado signed with the Tennessee Titans. He was released during final roster cuts on September 4, 2010.

=== Awards and honors ===
During his rookie season, Gado was named NFC Offensive Rookie of the Week in weeks 10 and 14 and was named NFL Offensive Rookie of the Month for November 2005. He also set the Green Bay Packers franchise record for single-game rushing yards by a rookie, tallying 171 yards on December 11, 2005.

== Personal life ==
Samkon Gado is a Christian. He is married with four children. He received a bachelor's degree in health promotions while taking pre-med courses at Liberty University. In 2015, Samkon graduated from Medical University of South Carolina. Following that, he spent time as a chief resident in the Saint Louis University Hospital otolaryngology program, treating COVID-19 patients.

== Post-football career ==
Samkon Gado, MD now serves as an otolaryngology (ear, nose & throat) specialist in Lynchburg, VA. He has co-founded a non-governmental organization with his sister, Ruth, called The Jonah Inheritance, to improve independent health care in Nigeria.
