= 2025 Coastal Carolina Chanticleers football team =

American college football season

2025 Coastal Carolina Chanticleers football

Independence Bowl, L 14–23 vs. Louisiana Tech
- Conference: Sun Belt Conference
- East Division
- Record: 6–7 (5–3 Sun Belt)
- Head coach: Tim Beck (3rd season; regular season); Jeremiah Johnson (interim, bowl game)
- Offensive coordinator: Drew Hollingshead (1st season)
- Offensive scheme: Power spread
- Defensive coordinator: Jeremiah Johnson (1st season)
- Base defense: Multiple 3–3–5
- Home stadium: Brooks Stadium

2025 Sun Belt Conference football standings
| | Conf. | | | Overall |
| Team | W | | L | W | | L |
|---|---|---|---|---|---|---|
East Division
| No. 19 James Madison xy$^ | 8 | – | 0 | 12 | – | 2 |
| Old Dominion | 6 | – | 2 | 10 | – | 3 |
| Coastal Carolina | 5 | – | 3 | 6 | – | 7 |
| Georgia Southern | 4 | – | 4 | 7 | – | 6 |
| Marshall | 3 | – | 5 | 5 | – | 7 |
| Appalachian State | 2 | – | 6 | 5 | – | 8 |
| Georgia State | 0 | – | 8 | 1 | – | 11 |
West Division
| Troy xy | 6 | – | 2 | 8 | – | 6 |
| Southern Miss | 5 | – | 3 | 7 | – | 6 |
| Louisiana | 5 | – | 3 | 6 | – | 7 |
| Arkansas State | 5 | – | 3 | 7 | – | 6 |
| Texas State | 3 | – | 5 | 7 | – | 6 |
| South Alabama | 3 | – | 5 | 4 | – | 8 |
| Louisiana–Monroe | 1 | – | 7 | 3 | – | 9 |
Championship: James Madison 31, Troy 14
^ – College Football Playoff participant; $ – Conference champion; x – Division champion/co-champions; y – Championship game participant; Rankings from AP Poll

The 2025 Coastal Carolina Chanticleers football team represented Coastal Carolina University in the Sun Belt Conference's East Division during the 2025 NCAA Division I FBS football season. Led by third-year head coach Tim Beck, the Chanticleers played their home games at the Brooks Stadium, located in Conway, South Carolina.

== Offseason ==
=== Transfers ===
==== Outgoing ====
| Player | Position | Destination |
|---|---|---|
| Darren Lloyd | RB | Anderson |
| Jayden McClintock | WR | Anderson |
| Cristian Conyer | DB | Appalachian State |
| Gavin Ransaw | DL | Arkansas State |
| Deondre Shepherd | S | Ball State |
| Brayden Hall | DB | Central Connecticut |
| Matthew McDoom | DB | Cincinnati |
| Simeon Price | RB | Colorado |
| Keontae Jenkins | CB | Delaware |
| Kyre Duplessis | WR | Delaware |
| D'Marius Rucker | RB | East Tennessee State |
| Noah Kim | QB | Eastern Michigan |
| Naejuan Barber | DL | Florida Atlantic |
| Deamontae Diggs | DL | Florida State |
| Jalen Harris | WR | Gardner–Webb |
| Elijah Lee | CB | Georgia Military |
| DJ Moore | QB | Holmes CC |
| Logan Brasfield | OL | Illinois State |
| Zack Zandier | TE | Lafayette |
| Jamahdia Whitby | WR | Lamar |
| Ethan Vasko | QB | Liberty |
| Clev Lubin | DE | Louisville |
| Farradj Titikpina | DL | Maine |
| Blake Martin | IOL | Mercer |
| Will Whitson | DL | Mississippi State |
| Spencer Kishbaugh | LB | Monmouth |
| De'Andre Coleman | WR | Newberry |
| Quan Peterson | DB | Newberry |
| Max Balthazar | RB | Rice |
| Cam Todd | IOL | Sam Houston |
| Christian Washington | RB | San Diego State |
| John Grant | TE | South Carolina State |
| Justin Keller | K | Southeast Missouri State |
| Jacob Katauskas | OL | Southern Illinois |
| TrayVaughn Swanigan | DL | Southern Utah |
| Tyler Wagner | IOL | Tennessee Tech |
| Tray Taylor | WR | Troy |
| Joah Cash | EDGE | Tulsa |
| Jake Buerk | OL | UNC Pembroke |
| Cohen Fuller | DL | UNLV |
| Donavan Manson | OL | UNLV |
| Braydon Bennett | RB | Virginia Tech |
| Marlon Corey II | OL | West Georgia |
| Joshua Saddler | DE | West Georgia |
| Kade Hensley | K | West Virginia |
| Kendall Karr | TE | Unknown |
| Andre Jones | WR | Unknown |
| Jaitlin Hampton | S | Unknown |
| Clinton Anokwuru | DL | Unknown |
| Will Rogers | DL | Unknown |
| Jacobi Moore | WR | Unknown |
| Keenen Hatcher | DL | Unknown |

==== Incoming ====
| Player | Position | Previous school |
|---|---|---|
| Joshua Daniel | IOL | Alabama State |
| Dontae Lunan | LB | Albany |
| Malcolm Gillie | WR | Ball State |
| Tyler Johnson | OL | Colorado |
| Shaikh Thompson | EDGE | East Carolina |
| Jon Hunt | QB | East Tennessee State |
| Luke Murphy | LB | Eastern Michigan |
| Jacob Robinson | S | Emory and Henry |
| Colton Hinton | WR | Furman |
| Javen Johnson | DL | Hampton |
| Aamarii Notice | DL | Idaho |
| Dante Thomas | S | Kansas State |
| Darrion Henry-Young | DL | Kentucky |
| Ezekiel Durham-Campbell | DL | Louisiana Tech |
| MJ Morris | QB | Maryland |
| Lionell Whitaker | DB | Maryland |
| Myles Mooyoung | DB | Miami (FL) |
| Robby Washington | DB | Miami (FL) |
| Ja’Marion Wayne | CB | Missouri |
| Noah Arinze | DE | New Mexico State |
| Desmond Jackson | OT | North Carolina |
| Emmett Brown | QB | San Jose State |
| Jordan Mack | DL | Seton Hill |
| Noah Gibson | CB | Shaw |
| Eric Taylor | DL | SMU |
| Tray Franklin | OL | South Carolina State |
| Jalen John | RB | UMass |
| Jeffrey Ugochukwu | S | Vanderbilt |
| Trishstin Glass | WR | Wake Forest |
| Karmello English | WR | West Georgia |
| Chris Henry | CB | West Virginia |
| Obinna Onwuka | CB | West Virginia |
| Eli Aragon | WR | Western Illinois |
| Blake Martin | OL | Wingate |

=== Coaching staff additions ===
| Name | New position | Previous team | Previous position | Source |
|---|---|---|---|---|
| Drew Hollingshead | Offensive coordinator | Western Kentucky | Co-offensive coordinator/Quarterbacks | |
| Jeremiah Johnson | Defensive coordinator | Louisiana Tech | Defensive coordinator | |
| Grayson McCall | Offensive analyst | – | – | |
| Trey Carter | Offensive analyst | Liberty | Offensive graduate assistant | |

== Preseason ==
=== Media poll ===
In the Sun Belt preseason coaches' poll, the Chanticleers were picked to finish fourth place in the East division.

Offensive lineman Nick Del Grande was named to the Preseason All-Sun Belt first team offense, respectively. Wide receiver Jameson Tucker and linebacker Shane Bruce were named to the second team offense and defense.

== Schedule ==
| Date | Time | Opponent | Site | TV | Result | Attendance |
|---|---|---|---|---|---|---|
| August 30 | 6:00 p.m. | at Virginia* | Scott Stadium; Charlottesville, VA | ACCN | L 7–48 | 46,143 |
| September 6 | 7:30 p.m. | Charleston Southern* | Brooks Stadium; Conway, SC (rivalry) | ESPN+ | W 13–0 | 22,217 |
| September 13 | 7:30 p.m. | East Carolina* | Brooks Stadium; Conway, SC | ESPN+ | L 0–38 | 21,634 |
| September 20 | 7:00 p.m. | at South Alabama | Hancock Whitney Stadium; Mobile, AL | ESPN+ | W 38–20 | 17,050 |
| October 4 | 6:00 p.m. | at Old Dominion | S.B. Ballard Stadium; Norfolk, VA | ESPN+ | L 7–47 | 20,895 |
| October 11 | 7:00 p.m. | Louisiana–Monroe | Brooks Stadium; Conway, SC | ESPN+ | W 23–8 | 15,211 |
| October 18 | 3:30 p.m. | at Appalachian State | Kidd Brewer Stadium; Boone, NC (rivalry) | ESPN+ | W 45–37 | 33,862 |
| October 30 | 7:30 p.m. | Marshall | Brooks Stadium; Conway, SC | ESPN2 | W 44–27 | 17,034 |
| November 8 | 4:00 p.m. | Georgia State^{†} | Brooks Stadium; Conway, SC | ESPN+ | W 40–27 | 18,878 |
| November 15 | 6:00 p.m. | at Georgia Southern | Paulson Stadium; Statesboro, GA | ESPN+ | L 40–45 | 22,738 |
| November 22 | 4:15 p.m. | at South Carolina* | Williams–Brice Stadium; Columbia, SC | SECN | L 7–51 | 78,452 |
| November 29 | 3:45 p.m. | James Madison | Brooks Stadium; Conway, SC | ESPNU | L 10–59 | 15,137 |
| December 30 | 2:00 p.m. | vs. Louisiana Tech* | Independence Stadium; Shreveport, LA (Independence Bowl) | ESPN | L 14–23 | 30,298 |
*Non-conference game; ^{†}Homecoming; All times are in Eastern time

== Game summaries ==
=== at Virginia ===
Coastal Carolina Chanticleers (0–0) at Virginia Cavaliers (0–0) – Game summary

| Quarter | 1 | 2 | 3 | 4 | Total |
|---|---|---|---|---|---|
| Chanticleers | 0 | 0 | 7 | 0 | 7 |
| Cavaliers | 7 | 21 | 14 | 6 | 48 |

at Scott Stadium • Charlottesville, Virginia

- Date: August 30
- Game time: 6:00 PM EDT
- Game weather: Sunny • Temperature: 74 °F (23 °C) • Wind: NE 6 mph
- Game attendance: 46,143
- Referee: Darryl DeBerry
- TV announcers (ACCN): Chris Cotter (play-by-play) and Max Browne (analyst)
- Box score, Recap

Game information

First quarter

- UVA – J'Mari Taylor 1-yard run (Will Bettridge kick), 0:01. Cavaliers 7–0. Drive: 4 plays, 52 yards, 2:07.

Second quarter

- UVA – Harrison Waylee 1-yard run (Will Bettridge kick), 11:22. Cavaliers 14–0. Drive: 7 plays, 36 yards, 2:27.
- UVA – Cam Ross 29-yard pass from Chandler Morris (Will Bettridge kick), 3:27. Cavaliers 21–0. Drive: 7 plays, 90 yards, 2:51.
- UVA – Jahmal Edrine 2-yard pass from Chandler Morris (Will Bettridge kick), 0:18. Cavaliers 28–0. Drive: 8 plays, 80 yards, 1:16.

Third quarter

- UVA – J'Mari Taylor 2-yard run (Will Bettridge kick), 10:41. Cavaliers 35–0. Drive: 8 plays, 60 yards, 3:58.
- CCU – Ja'Vin Simpkins 8-yard run (Kian Afrookhteh kick), 4:26. Cavaliers 35–7. Drive: 14 plays, 79 yards, 6:11.
- UVA – Cam Ross 100-yard kickoff return (Will Bettridge kick), 4:12. Cavaliers 42–7.

Fourth quarter

- UVA – Will Bettridge 32-yard field goal, 11:13. Cavaliers 45–7. Drive: 15 plays, 53 yards, 5:15.
- UVA – Will Bettridge 41-yard field goal, 7:03. Cavaliers 48–7. Drive: 4 plays, 8 yards, 1:48.

| Statistics | CCU | UVA |
|---|---|---|
| First downs | 13 | 23 |
| Plays–yards | 67–254 | 79–454 |
| Rushes–yards | 30–91 | 43–164 |
| Passing yards | 163 | 290 |
| Passing: Comp–Att–Int | 20–37–1 | 22–36–0 |
| Turnovers | 1 | 0 |
| Time of possession | 26:27 | 33:33 |

| Team | Category | Player | Statistics |
|---|---|---|---|
| Coastal Carolina | Passing | MJ Morris | 20/36, 163 yards, INT |
| Coastal Carolina | Rushing | Dominic Knicely | 7 carries, 27 yards |
| Coastal Carolina | Receiving | Brooks Johnson | 2 receptions, 36 yards |
| Virginia | Passing | Chandler Morris | 19/27, 264 yards, 2 TD |
| Virginia | Rushing | Chandler Morris | 5 carries, 50 yards |
| Virginia | Receiving | Cam Ross | 7 receptions, 124 yards, TD |

=== Charleston Southern (FCS) ===
Charleston Southern Buccaneers (FCS) (0–1) at Coastal Carolina Chanticleers (0–1) – Game summary

| Quarter | 1 | 2 | 3 | 4 | Total |
|---|---|---|---|---|---|
| Buccaneers (FCS) | 0 | 0 | 0 | 0 | 0 |
| Chanticleers | 0 | 3 | 0 | 10 | 13 |

at Brooks Stadium • Conway, South Carolina

- Date: September 6
- Game time: 7:30 PM EDT
- Game weather: Sunny
- Game attendance: 22,217
- Referee: Scott Broadway
- TV announcers (ESPN+): Sam Weiderhaft (play-by-play), Ricky Sapp (analyst) and Haley Nitsche (sideline)
- Box score, Recap

Game information

First quarter

- No scoring plays.

Second quarter

- CCU – Kian Afrookhteh 21-yard field goal, 11:12. Chanticleers 3–0. Drive: 15 plays, 57 yards, 5:43.

Third quarter

- No scoring plays.

Fourth quarter

- CCU – Tad Hudson 4-yard run (Kian Afrookhteh kick), 10:02. Chanticleers 10–0. Drive: 16 plays, 83 yards, 7:03.
- CCU – Kian Afrookhteh 29-yard field goal, 1:11. Chanticleers 13–0. Drive: 15 plays, 75 yards, 6:30.

| Statistics | CHSO | CCU |
|---|---|---|
| First downs | 10 | 27 |
| Plays–yards | 48–153 | 78–388 |
| Rushes–yards | 26–98 | 51–249 |
| Passing yards | 55 | 139 |
| Passing: Comp–Att–Int | 10–22–1 | 16–27–3 |
| Turnovers | 1 | 3 |
| Time of possession | 24:25 | 35:35 |

| Team | Category | Player | Statistics |
|---|---|---|---|
| Charleston Southern | Passing | Zolten Osborne | 10/22, 55 yards, INT |
| Charleston Southern | Rushing | Ke'Marion Baldwin | 8 carries, 62 yards |
| Charleston Southern | Receiving | Chris Rhone | 5 receptions, 32 yards |
| Coastal Carolina | Passing | MJ Morris | 13/22, 102 yards, 3 INT |
| Coastal Carolina | Rushing | Dominic Knicely | 9 carries, 92 yards |
| Coastal Carolina | Receiving | Bryson Graves | 5 receptions, 61 yards |

=== East Carolina ===
East Carolina Pirates (1–1) at Coastal Carolina Chanticleers (1–1) – Game summary

| Quarter | 1 | 2 | 3 | 4 | Total |
|---|---|---|---|---|---|
| Pirates | 10 | 0 | 7 | 21 | 38 |
| Chanticleers | 0 | 0 | 0 | 0 | 0 |

at Brooks Stadium • Conway, SC

- Date: September 13, 2025
- Game time: 7:30 PM EDT
- Game weather: Cloudy • Temperature: 74 °F (23 °C) • Wind: NE at 13 miles per hour (21 km/h)
- Game attendance: 21,634
- Referee: Tim Rich
- TV announcers (ESPN+): Sam Weiderhaft (play-by-play), Ricky Sapp (analyst) and Haley Nitsche (sideline)
- Box score, Recap

Game information

First quarter

- (7:26) ECU – Yannick Smith 5-yard pass from Katin Houser, Nick Mazzie kick (Drive: 9 plays, 69 yards, 3:42; East Carolina 7–0)
- (1:44) ECU – Nick Mazzie 36-yard field goal (Drive: 11 plays, 52 yards, 4:11; East Carolina 10–0)

Second quarter

- No scoring plays.

Third quarter

- (8:15) ECU – Parker Jenkins 4-yard run, Nick Mazzie kick (Drive: 6 plays, 45 yards, 1:36; East Carolina 17–0)

Fourth quarter

- (13:04) ECU – Yannick Smith 4-yard pass from Katin Houser, Nick Mazzie kick (Drive: 10 plays, 59 yards, 3:51; East Carolina 24–0)
- (8:32) ECU – Mike Wright 18-yard run, Nick Mazzie kick (Drive: 4 plays, 56 yards, 2:15; East Carolina 31–0)
- (4:08) ECU – TJ Engleman Jr. 1-yard run, Nick Mazzie kick (Drive: 5 plays, 35 yards, 0:57; East Carolina 38–0)

| Statistics | ECU | CCU |
|---|---|---|
| First downs | 29 | 18 |
| Plays–yards | 86–497 | 65–239 |
| Rushes–yards | 49–204 | 26–67 |
| Passing yards | 293 | 172 |
| Passing: comp–att–int | 28–37–1 | 19–39–2 |
| Turnovers | 1 | 5 |
| Time of possession | 33:55 | 26:05 |

| Team | Category | Player | Statistics |
|---|---|---|---|
| East Carolina | Passing | Katin Houser | 28/37, 293 yards, 2 TD, INT |
| East Carolina | Rushing | London Montgomery | 15 carries, 59 yards |
| East Carolina | Receiving | Anthony Smith | 11 receptions, 136 yards |
| Coastal Carolina | Passing | Tad Hudson | 19/39, 172 yards, 2 INT |
| Coastal Carolina | Rushing | Ja'Vin Simpkins | 4 carries, 25 yards |
| Coastal Carolina | Receiving | Robby Washington | 3 receptions, 54 yards |

=== at South Alabama ===
Coastal Carolina Chanticleers (1–2) at South Alabama Jaguars (1–2) – Game summary

| Quarter | 1 | 2 | 3 | 4 | Total |
|---|---|---|---|---|---|
| Chanticleers | 0 | 7 | 14 | 17 | 38 |
| Jaguars | 0 | 14 | 3 | 3 | 20 |

at Hancock Whitney Stadium • Mobile, AL

- Date: September 20, 2025
- Game time: 7:00 p.m. EDT
- Game weather: Sunny • Temperature: 82 °F (28 °C) • Wind: N 2 mph
- Game attendance: 17,050
- Referee: Jeremy Parker
- TV announcers (ESPN+): Pat Greenwood (play-by-play) and Brian Genard (analyst)
- Box score, Recap

Game information

First quarter

- No scoring plays.

Second quarter

- (7:12) USA – Anthony Eager 0-yard run, Hamilton DiBoyan kick (Drive: 8 plays, 60 yards, 3:37; South Alabama 7–0)
- (5:08) CCU – Malick Meiga 19-yard pass from Tad Hudson, Kian Afrookhteh kick (Drive: 6 plays, 65 yards, 2:04; Tied 7–7)
- (1:24) USA – Kentrel Bullock 2-yard run, Hamilton DiBoyan kick (Drive: 8 plays, 75 yards, 3:44; South Alabama 14–7)

Third quarter

- (13:16) CCU – Robby Washington 17-yard pass from Tad Hudson, Kian Afrookhteh kick (Drive: 3 plays, 40 yards, 1:01; Tied 14–14)
- (11:19) CCU – Tad Hudson 7-yard run, Kian Afrookhteh kick (Drive: 5 plays, 20 yards, 1:47; Coastal Carolina 21–14)
- (5:11) USA – Hamilton DiBoyan 37-yard field goal (Drive: 12 plays, 55 yards, 6:08; Coastal Carolina 21–17)

Fourth quarter

- (10:00) CCU – Ja'Vin Simpkins 24-yard run, Kian Afrookhteh kick (Drive: 6 plays, 80 yards, 2:29; Coastal Carolina 28–17)
- (6:32) USA – Hamilton DiBoyan 47-yard field goal (Drive: 8 plays, 46 yards, 3:28; Coastal Carolina 28–20)
- (2:48) CCU – Kian Afrookhteh 44-yard field goal (Drive: 4 plays, 0 yards, 0:53; Coastal Carolina 31–20)
- (2:32) CCU – Tray Brown 13-yard fumble recovery, Kian Afrookhteh kick (Coastal Carolina 38–20)

| Statistics | CCU | USA |
|---|---|---|
| First downs | 15 | 22 |
| Plays–yards | 56–294 | 80–420 |
| Rushes–yards | 31–182 | 44–223 |
| Passing yards | 112 | 197 |
| Passing: Comp–Att–Int | 13–25–0 | 22–36–2 |
| Turnovers | 0 | 2 |
| Time of possession | 23:19 | 36:41 |

| Team | Category | Player | Statistics |
|---|---|---|---|
| Coastal Carolina | Passing | Tad Hudson | 13/25, 112 yards, 2 TD |
| Coastal Carolina | Rushing | Ja'Vin Simpkins | 9 carries, 84 yards, TD |
| Coastal Carolina | Receiving | Bryson Graves | 5 receptions, 35 yards |
| South Alabama | Passing | Bishop Davenport | 22/36, 197 yards, 2 INT |
| South Alabama | Rushing | Keenan Phillips | 13 carries, 104 yards |
| South Alabama | Receiving | Devin Voisin | 8 receptions, 94 yards |

=== at Old Dominion ===
Coastal Carolina Chanticleers (2–2) at Old Dominion Monarchs (3–1) – Game summary

| Quarter | 1 | 2 | 3 | 4 | Total |
|---|---|---|---|---|---|
| Chanticleers | 0 | 0 | 0 | 7 | 7 |
| Monarchs | 10 | 24 | 10 | 3 | 47 |

at S.B. Ballard Stadium • Norfolk, VA

- Date: October 4, 2025
- Game time: 6:00 p.m. EDT
- Game weather: Sunny • Temperature: 72 °F (22 °C) • Wind: SE 3 mph
- Game attendance: 20,895
- Referee: Ted Pitts
- TV announcers (ESPN+): Scott Jackson (play-by-play) and Andy Mashaw (analyst)
- Box score, Recap

Game information

First quarter

- (11:44) ODU – Na'eem Abdul-Rahim Gladding 3-yard pass from Colton Joseph, Riley Callaghan kick (Drive: 9 plays, 87 yards, 3:11; Old Dominion 7–0)
- (2:19) ODU – Riley Callaghan 27-yard field goal (Drive: 10 plays, 70 yards, 4:37; Old Dominion 10–0)

Second quarter

- (12:54) ODU – Ke'Travion Hargrove 80-yard pass from Colton Joseph, Riley Callaghan kick (Drive: 1 play, 80 yards, 0:10; Old Dominion 17–0)
- (6:05) ODU – Na'eem Abdul-Rahim Gladding 13-yard pass from Colton Joseph, Riley Callaghan kick (Drive: 8 plays, 71 yards, 2:32; Old Dominion 24–0)
- (4:48) ODU – Riley Callaghan 34-yard field goal (Drive: 5 plays, 12 yards, 0:54; Old Dominion 27–0)
- (2:48) ODU – Na'eem Abdul-Rahim Gladding 10-yard pass from Colton Joseph, Riley Callaghan kick (Drive: 2 plays, 28 yards, 0:26; Old Dominion 34–0)

Third quarter

- (12:50) ODU – Colton Joseph 50-yard run, Riley Callaghan kick (Drive: 5 plays, 66 yards, 1:05; Old Dominion 41–0)
- (7:02) ODU – Riley Callaghan 22-yard field goal (Drive: 12 plays, 54 yards, 4:03; Old Dominion 44–0)

Fourth quarter

- (12:20) CCU – Cameron Wright 3-yard pass from Tad Hudson, Kian Afrookhteh kick (Drive: 12 plays, 68 yards, 4:06; Old Dominion 44–7)
- (1:56) ODU – Riley Callaghan 26-yard field goal (Drive: 9 plays, 62 yards, 4:52; Old Dominion 47–7)

| Statistics | CCU | ODU |
|---|---|---|
| First downs | 12 | 30 |
| Plays–yards | 67–189 | 77–619 |
| Rushes–yards | 37–81 | 43–302 |
| Passing yards | 108 | 317 |
| Passing: Comp–Att–Int | 19–30–1 | 18–34–0 |
| Turnovers | 2 | 1 |
| Time of possession | 30:26 | 29:34 |

| Team | Category | Player | Statistics |
|---|---|---|---|
| Coastal Carolina | Passing | Tad Hudson | 19/30, 108 yards, TD, INT |
| Coastal Carolina | Rushing | Ja'Vin Simpkins | 8 carries, 39 yards |
| Coastal Carolina | Receiving | Eli Aragon | 4 receptions, 35 yards |
| Old Dominion | Passing | Colton Joseph | 17/30, 315 yards, 4 TD |
| Old Dominion | Rushing | Trequan Jones | 14 carries, 98 yards |
| Old Dominion | Receiving | Na'eem Abdul-Rahim Gladding | 7 receptions, 101 yards, 3 TD |

=== Louisiana–Monroe ===
Louisiana–Monroe Warhawks (3–2) at Coastal Carolina Chanticleers (2–3) – Game summary

| Quarter | 1 | 2 | 3 | 4 | Total |
|---|---|---|---|---|---|
| Warhawks | 0 | 0 | 8 | 0 | 8 |
| Chanticleers | 6 | 10 | 7 | 0 | 23 |

at Brooks Stadium • Conway, SC

- Date: October 11, 2025
- Game time: 7:00 p.m. EDT
- Game weather: Sunny • Temperature: 67 °F (19 °C) • Wind: S 16 mph
- Game attendance: 15,211
- Referee: Steven Robinson
- TV announcers (ESPN+): Sam Weiderhaft (play-by-play), Ricky Sapp (analyst) and Haley Nitsche (sideline)
- Box score, Recap

Game information

First quarter

- (8:52) CCU – Kian Afrookhteh 38-yard field goal (Drive: 15 plays, 60 yards, 6:07; Coastal Carolina 3–0)
- (4:12) CCU – Kian Afrookhteh 26-yard field goal (Drive: 6 plays, 50 yards, 2:17; Coastal Carolina 6–0)

Second quarter

- (6:59) CCU – Kian Afrookhteh 39-yard field goal (Drive: 8 plays, 36 yards, 2:49; Coastal Carolina 9–0)
- (0:12) CCU – Brooks Johnson 8-yard pass from Samari Collier, Kian Afrookhteh kick (Drive: 7 plays, 73 yards, 1:12; Coastal Carolina 16–0)

Third quarter

- (9:38) ULM – Jonathan Bibbs 27-yard pass from Aidan Armenta, Hunter Herring pass to Dorian Lewis for two-point conversion (Drive: 4 plays, 74 yards, 1:23; Coastal Carolina 16–8)
- (7:14) CCU – Samari Collier 39-yard run, Kian Afrookhteh kick (Drive: 7 plays, 69 yards, 2:16; Coastal Carolina 23–8)

Fourth quarter

- No scoring plays.

| Statistics | ULM | CCU |
|---|---|---|
| First downs | 14 | 16 |
| Plays–yards | 62–315 | 70–378 |
| Rushes–yards | 33–139 | 51–286 |
| Passing yards | 176 | 92 |
| Passing: Comp–Att–Int | 14-29-2 | 8-19-0 |
| Turnovers | 2 | 1 |
| Time of possession | 30:04 | 29:56 |

| Team | Category | Player | Statistics |
|---|---|---|---|
| Louisiana–Monroe | Passing | Aidan Arments | 14/28, 176 yards, TD, INT |
| Louisiana–Monroe | Rushing | Braylon McReynolds | 14 carries, 78 yards |
| Louisiana–Monroe | Receiving | Jonathan Bibbs | 5 receptions, 79 yards, TD |
| Coastal Carolina | Passing | Samari Collier | 5/15, 37 yards, TD |
| Coastal Carolina | Rushing | Samari Collier | 12 carries, 86 yards, TD |
| Coastal Carolina | Receiving | Jameson Tucker | 1 reception, 37 yards |

=== at Appalachian State (rivalry) ===
Coastal Carolina Chanticleers (3–3) at Appalachian State Mountaineers (4–2) – Game summary

| Quarter | 1 | 2 | 3 | 4 | Total |
|---|---|---|---|---|---|
| Chanticleers | 10 | 7 | 14 | 14 | 45 |
| Mountaineers | 14 | 10 | 10 | 3 | 37 |

at Kidd Brewer Stadium • Boone, North Carolina

- Date: October 18, 2025
- Game weather: Sunny • Temperature: 71 °F (22 °C) • Wind: E 5 mph
- Game attendance: 33,862
- Referee: Scott Broadway
- TV announcers (ESPN+): David Jackson (play-by-play) and Avery Johnson (analyst)
- Box score, Recap

Game information

First quarter

- (10:10) APP – Davion Dozier 15-yard pass from JJ Kohl, Dominic De Freitas kick (Drive: 10 plays, 75 yards, 4:50; Appalachian State 7–0)
- (7:56) CCU – Kian Afrookhteh 43-yard field goal (Drive: 7 plays, 49 yards, 2:14; Appalachian State 7–3)
- (3:26) APP – Rashod Dubinion 12-yard run, Dominic De Freitas kick (Drive: 10 plays, 75 yards, 4:30; Appalachian State 14–3)
- (0:30) CCU – Malcolm Gillie 34-yard pass from MJ Morris, Kian Afrookhteh kick (Drive: 7 plays, 65 yards, 2:48; Appalachian State 14–10)

Second quarter

- (8:45) APP – Jaden Barnes 6-yard pass from JJ Kohl, Dominic De Freitas kick (Drive: 15 plays, 75 yards, 6:45; Appalachian State 21–10)
- (3:40) CCU – Samari Collier 4-yard run, Kian Afrookhteh kick (Drive: 11 plays, 75 yards, 5:05; Appalachian State 21–17)
- (0:00) APP – Dominic De Freitas 31-yard field goal (Drive: 1 play, 0 yards, 0:04; Appalachian State 24–17)

Third quarter

- (12:52) APP – Jaden Barnes 77-yard punt return, Dominic De Freitas kick (Drive: 3 plays, 0 yards, 2:08; Appalachian State 31–17)
- (9:49) CCU – Samari Collier 6-yard run, Kian Afrookhteh kick (Drive: 7 plays, 75 yards, 3:03; Appalachian State 31–24)
- (4:37) APP – Dominic De Freitas 25-yard field goal (Drive: 13 plays, 68 yards, 5:12; Appalachian State 34–24)
- (0:04) CCU – Jameson Tucker 37-yard pass from Samari Collier, Kian Afrookhteh kick (Drive: 8 plays, 75 yards, 4:28; Appalachian State 34–31)

Fourth quarter

- (9:03) APP – Dominic De Freitas 23-yard field goal (Drive: 14 plays, 84 yards, 6:00; Appalachian State 37–31)
- (3:19) CCU – Dominic Knicely 1-yard run, Kian Afrookhteh kick (Drive: 13 plays, 75 yards, 5:44; Coastal Carolina 38–37)
- (1:56) CCU – Jevon Edwards 8-yard run, Kian Afrookhteh kick (Drive: 3 plays, 27 yards, 0:20; Coastal Carolina 45–37)

| Statistics | CCU | APP |
|---|---|---|
| First downs | 23 | 27 |
| Plays–yards | 63–410 | 76–410 |
| Rushes–yards | 41–246 | 35–132 |
| Passing yards | 164 | 278 |
| Passing: Comp–Att–Int | 15–22–1 | 27–41–0 |
| Turnovers | 1 | 1 |
| Time of possession | 28:29 | 31:31 |

| Team | Category | Player | Statistics |
|---|---|---|---|
| Coastal Carolina | Passing | Samari Collier | 12/19, 118 yards, TD, INT |
| Coastal Carolina | Rushing | Samari Collier | 17 carries, 74 yards, 2 TD |
| Coastal Carolina | Receiving | Jameson Tucker | 1 reception, 37 yards, TD |
| Appalachian State | Passing | J. J. Kohl | 27/41, 278 yards, 2 TD |
| Appalachian State | Rushing | Jaquari Lewis | 15 carries, 43 yards |
| Appalachian State | Receiving | Davion Dozier | 4 receptions, 70 yards, TD |

=== Marshall ===
Marshall Thundering Herd (4–3) at Coastal Carolina Chanticleers (4–3) – Game summary

| Quarter | 1 | 2 | 3 | 4 | Total |
|---|---|---|---|---|---|
| Thundering Herd | 10 | 10 | 7 | 0 | 27 |
| Chanticleers | 3 | 14 | 20 | 7 | 44 |

at Brooks Stadium • Conway, SC

- Date: October 30, 2025
- Game time: 7:30 PM EDT
- Game weather: Cloudy• Temperature: 58 °F (14 °C) • Wind: E 10 mph
- Game attendance: 17,034
- Referee: Ted Pitts
- TV announcers (ESPN2): Dave Neal (play-by-play) and Fozzy Whittaker (analyst)
- Box score, Recap

Game information

First quarter

- (13:08) MRSH – Boogie Trotter 51-yard interception return, Lorcan Quinn kick (Marshall 7–0)
- (9:55) CCU – Kian Afrookhteh 36-yard field goal (Drive: 8 plays, 56 yards, 3:13; Marshall 7–3)
- (5:27) MRSH – Lorcan Quinn 55-yard field goal (Drive: 4 plays, –1 yard, 0:50; Marshall 10–3)

Second quarter

- (14:14) MRSH – Lorcan Quinn 23-yard field goal (Drive: 11 plays, 49 yards, 4:47; Marshall 13–3)
- (10:12) CCU – Samari Collier 2-yard run, Kian Afrookhteh kick (Drive: 8 plays, 54 yards, 3:53; Marshall 13–10)
- (6:49) MRSH – Jo'Shon Barbie 4-yard run, Lorcan Quinn kick (Drive: 8 plays, 65 yards, 3:23; Marshall 20–10)
- (5:33) CCU – Dominic Knicely 59-yard run, Kian Afrookhteh kick (Drive: 4 plays, 75 yards, 1:16; Marshall 20–17)

Third quarter

- (12:46) MRSH – De'Andre Tamarez 7-yard pass from Carlos Del Rio-Wilson, Lorcan Quinn kick (Drive: 7 plays, 75 yards, 2:14; Marshall 27–17)
- (11:26) CCU – Malcolm Gillie 69-yard pass from Samari Collier, Kian Afrookhteh kick (Drive: 3 plays, 75 yards, 1:20; Marshall 27–24)
- (10:44) CCU – Bryson Graves 17-yard pass from Samari Collier, Kian Afrookhteh kick (Drive: 2 plays, 18 yards, 0:32; Coastal Carolina 31–27)
- (7:56) CCU – Kian Afrookhteh 42-yard field goal (Drive: 4 plays, 3 yards, 1:29; Coastal Carolina 34–27)
- (3:21) CCU – Kian Afrookhteh 24-yard field goal (Drive: 8 plays, 32 yards, 3:54; Coastal Carolina 37–27)

Fourth quarter

- (8:08) CCU – Samari Collier 1-yard run, Kian Afrookhteh kick (Drive: 3 plays, 40 yards, 1:00; Coastal Carolina 44–27)

| Statistics | MRSH | CCU |
|---|---|---|
| First downs | 22 | 16 |
| Plays–yards | 81–432 | 66–410 |
| Rushes–yards | 45–279 | 45–214 |
| Passing yards | 153 | 196 |
| Passing: Comp–Att–Int | 21–36–2 | 8–21–1 |
| Turnovers | 5 | 2 |
| Time of possession | 31:33 | 28:27 |

| Team | Category | Player | Statistics |
|---|---|---|---|
| Marshall | Passing | Carlos Del Rio-Wilson | 21/36, 153 yards, TD, 2 INT |
| Marshall | Rushing | Antwan Roberts | 15 carries, 134 yards |
| Marshall | Receiving | De'Andre Tamarez | 5 receptions, 45 yards, TD |
| Coastal Carolina | Passing | Samari Collier | 8/20, 196 yards, 2 TD, INT |
| Coastal Carolina | Rushing | Dominic Knicely | 5 carries, 76 yards, TD |
| Coastal Carolina | Receiving | Malcom Gillie | 1 reception, 69 yards, TD |

=== Georgia State ===
Georgia State Panthers (1–7) at Coastal Carolina Chanticleers (5–3) – Game summary

| Quarter | 1 | 2 | 3 | 4 | Total |
|---|---|---|---|---|---|
| Panthers | 14 | 0 | 0 | 13 | 27 |
| Chanticleers | 14 | 9 | 10 | 7 | 40 |

at Brooks Stadium • Conway, SC

- Date: November 8, 2025
- Game time: 4:00 p.m. EST
- Game weather: Sunny • Temperature: 77 °F (25 °C) • Wind: NE 7 mph
- Game attendance: 18,878
- Referee: Steven Robinson
- TV announcers (ESPN+): Sam Weiderhaft (play-by-play), Ricky Sapp (analyst) and Haley Nitsche (sideline)
- Box score, Recap

Game information

First quarter

- (11:34) CCU – Samari Collier 85-yard run, Kian Afrookhteh kick (Drive: 1 play, 85 yards, 0:13; Coastal Carolina 7–0)
- (5:07) GAST – Cameran Brown 1-yard run, Liam Rickman kick (Drive: 13 plays, 75 yards, 6:27; Tied 7–7)
- (1:36) CCU – Robby Washington 16-yard pass from Samari Collier, Kian Afrookhteh kick (Drive: 8 plays, 75 yards, 3:31; Coastal Carolina 14–7)
- (0:56) GAST – Grant Hollier 8-yard pass from Cameran Brown, Liam Rickman kick (Drive: 3 plays, 65 yards, 0:40; Tied 14–14)

Second quarter

- (11:36) CCU – Kian Afrookhteh 30-yard field goal (Drive: 10 plays, 62 yards, 4:20; Coastal Carolina 17–14)
- (6:47) CCU – Kian Afrookhteh 34-yard field goal (Drive: 8 plays, 28 yards, 2:49; Coastal Carolina 20–14)
- (0:12) CCU – Kian Afrookhteh 28-yard field goal (Drive: 6 plays, 28 yards, 2:17; Coastal Carolina 23–14)

Third quarter

- (9:39) CCU – Philippe Laforge 47-yard field goal (Drive: 4 plays, -4 yards, 1:44; Coastal Carolina 26–14)
- (1:41) CCU – Karmello English 3-yard pass from Samari Collier, Philippe Laforge kick (Drive: 12 plays, 80 yards, 5:52; Coastal Carolina 33–14)

Fourth quarter

- (11:35) CCU – Karmello English 31-yard pass from Samari Collier, Kian Afrookhteh kick (Drive: 5 plays, 45 yards, 1:56; Coastal Carolina 40–14)
- (7:42) GAST – Jordon Simmons 1-yard run, two-point pass conversion attempt failed (Drive: 9 plays, 75 yards, 3:53; Coastal Carolina 40–20)
- (6:41) GAST – Ted Hurst 9-yard pass from TJ Finley, Liam Rickman kick (Drive: 3 plays, 59 yards, 0:58; Coastal Carolina 40–27)

| Statistics | GAST | CCU |
|---|---|---|
| First downs | 20 | 19 |
| Plays–yards | 75–423 | 65–444 |
| Rushes–yards | 37–130 | 47–324 |
| Passing yards | 293 | 120 |
| Passing: Comp–Att–Int | 25-38-1 | 11-18-0 |
| Turnovers | 2 | 0 |
| Time of possession | 30:56 | 29:04 |

| Team | Category | Player | Statistics |
|---|---|---|---|
| Georgia State | Passing | TJ Finley | 16/26, 177 yards, TD, INT |
| Georgia State | Rushing | Jordan Simmons | 20 carries, 99 yards, TD |
| Georgia State | Receiving | Ted Hurst | 10 receptions, 165 yards, TD |
| Coastal Carolina | Passing | Samari Collier | 11/18, 120 yards, 3 TD |
| Coastal Carolina | Rushing | Samari Collier | 10 carries, 123 yards, TD |
| Coastal Carolina | Receiving | Karmello English | 4 receptions, 63 yards, 2 TD |

=== at Georgia Southern ===
Coastal Carolina Chanticleers (6-3) at Georgia Southern Eagles (4–5) – Game summary

| Quarter | 1 | 2 | 3 | 4 | Total |
|---|---|---|---|---|---|
| Chanticleers | 17 | 10 | 6 | 7 | 40 |
| Eagles | 21 | 14 | 7 | 3 | 45 |

at Paulson Stadium • Statesboro, GA

- Date: November 15, 2025
- Game time: 6:00 p.m. EDT
- Game weather: Sunny • Temperature: 65 °F (18 °C)
- Game attendance: 22,738
- Referee: Trennis Livingston
- TV announcers (ESPN+): Danny Waugh (play-by-play), Jayson Foster (analyst) and Skye Taylor (sideline)

Game information

First quarter

- (11:04) GASO – OJ Arnold 1-yard run, Tripp Bryant kick (Drive: 5 plays, 92 yards, 1:49; Georgia Southern 7–0)
- (10:52) CCU – Jameson Tucker 75-yard pass from Bryson Graves, Kian Afrookhteh kick (Drive: 1 play, 75 yards, 0:12; Tied 7–7)
- (8:38) GASO – Camden Brown 4-yard pass from Weston Bryan, Tripp Bryant kick (Drive: 5 plays, 72 yards, 2:08; Georgia Southern 14–7)
- (4:14) CCU – Samari Collier 5-yard run, Kian Afrookhteh kick (Drive: 4 plays, 38 yards, 1:42; Tied 14–14)
- (3:58) GASO – OJ Arnold 62-yard run, Tripp Bryant kick (Drive: 1 play, 62 yards, 0:08; Georgia Southern 21–14)
- (0:47) CCU – Kian Afrookhteh 41-yard field goal (Drive: 8 plays, 67 yards, 3:06; Georgia Southern 21–17)

Second quarter

- (12:43) GASO – OJ Arnold 41-yard pass from JC French IV, Tripp Bryant kick (Drive: 6 plays, 65 yards, 2:55; Georgia Southern 28–17)
- (7:39) CCU – Philippe Laforge 51-yard field goal (Drive: 13 plays, 45 yards, 4:57; Georgia Southern 28–20)
- (3:34) GASO – Camden Brown 7-yard pass from JC French IV, Tripp Bryant kick (Drive: 2 plays, 6 yards, 0:45; Georgia Southern 35–20)
- (3:24) CCU – Malcolm Gillie 96-yard kickoff return, Kian Afrookhteh kick (Drive: 0 plays, 0 yards, 0:00; Georgia Southern 35–27)

Third quarter

- (11:24) CCU – Karmello English 12-yard pass from Robby Washington, two-point pass conversion attempt failed (Drive: 9 plays, 75 yards, 3:36; Georgia Southern 35–33)
- (10:52) GASO – Camden Brown 73-yard pass from OJ Arnold, Tripp Bryant kick (Drive: 2 plays, 75 yards, 0:32; Georgia Southern 42–33)

Fourth quarter

- (14:57) GASO – Tripp Bryant 29-yard field goal (Drive: 8 plays, 70 yards, 2:40; Georgia Southern 45–33)
- (11:32) CCU – Dominic Knicely 16-yard run, Kian Afrookhteh kick (Drive: 10 plays, 75 yards, 3:18; Georgia Southern 45–40)

| Statistics | CCU | GASO |
|---|---|---|
| First downs | 24 | 24 |
| Total yards | 74–482 | 74–653 |
| Rushing yards | 38–204 | 40–312 |
| Passing yards | 278 | 341 |
| Passing: Comp–Att–Int | 19-36-1 | 23-34-1 |
| Turnovers | 1 | 2 |
| Time of possession | 28:39 | 31:21 |

| Team | Category | Player | Statistics |
|---|---|---|---|
| Coastal Carolina | Passing | Tad Hudson | 15/28, 173 yards, INT |
| Coastal Carolina | Rushing | Samari Collier | 6 carries, 69 yards, TD |
| Coastal Carolina | Receiving | Jameson Tucker | 4 receptions, 107 yards, TD |
| Georgia Southern | Passing | JC French IV | 22/33, 264 yards, 2 TD, INT |
| Georgia Southern | Rushing | OJ Arnold | 21 carries, 267 yards, 2 TD |
| Georgia Southern | Receiving | Camden Brown | 5 receptions, 133 yards, 3 TD |

=== at South Carolina ===
Coastal Carolina Chanticleers (6-4) at South Carolina Gamecocks (3-7) – Game summary

| Quarter | 1 | 2 | 3 | 4 | Total |
|---|---|---|---|---|---|
| Chanticleers | 0 | 0 | 0 | 7 | 7 |
| Gamecocks | 20 | 17 | 7 | 7 | 51 |

at Williams–Brice Stadium • Columbia, SC

- Date: November 22, 2025
- Game time: 4:15 p.m. EDT
- Game weather: Clear • Temperature: 77 °F (25 °C) • Wind: SW 8 mph
- Game attendance: 78,452
- Referee: Matt Loeffler
- TV announcers (SEC Network): Dave Neal (play-by-play), Fozzy Whitaker (analyst) and Morgan Uber (sideline)

Game information

First Quarter

- (14:46) SC – Jayden Sellers 75-yard pass from LaNorris Sellers, William Joyce kick (Drive: 1 play, 75 yards, 0:14; South Carolina 7–0)
- (8:50) SC – LaNorris Sellers 2-yard run, two-point conversion run attempt failed (Drive: 6 plays, 74 yards, 3:34; South Carolina 14–0)
- (7:27) SC – Brady Hunt 1-yard run, William Joyce kick (Drive: 3 plays, 29 yards, 1:12; South Carolina 21–0)

Second Quarter

- (9:14) SC – Donovan Murph 3-yard pass from LaNorris Sellers, William Joyce kick (Drive: 9 plays, 77 yards, 4:31; South Carolina 28–0)
- (5:05) SC – LaNorris Sellers 5-yard run, William Joyce kick (Drive: 5 plays, 80 yards, 1:54; South Carolina 34–0)
- (0:01) SC – William Joyce 47-yard field goal (Drive: 3 plays, 32 yards, 0:24; South Carolina 37–0)

Third Quarter

- (1:44) SC – Brady Hunt 1-yard run, William Joyce kick (Drive: 13 plays, 83 yards, 6:33; South Carolina 44–0)

Fourth Quarter

- (9:37) CCU – Jameson Tucker 17-yard punt return, Kian Afrookhteh kick (Drive: 3 plays, 4 yards, 1:51; South Carolina 44–7)
- (1:56) SC – Bradley Dunn 1-yard run, William Joyce kick (Drive: 15 plays, 85 yards, 7:36; South Carolina 51–7)

| Statistics | CCU | SC |
|---|---|---|
| First downs | 13 | 25 |
| Plays–yards | 65–220 | 69–579 |
| Rushes–yards | 29–46 | 39–264 |
| Passing yards | 174 | 315 |
| Passing: comp–att–int | 27–36–0 | 23–30–0 |
| Turnovers | 1 | 0 |
| Time of possession | 26:10 | 33:50 |

| Team | Category | Player | Statistics |
|---|---|---|---|
| Coastal Carolina | Passing | Tad Hudson | 27/36, 174 yards |
| Coastal Carolina | Rushing | Javin Simpkins | 8 carries, 26 yards |
| Coastal Carolina | Receiving | Cameron Wright | 4 receptions, 33 yards |
| South Carolina | Passing | LaNorris Sellers | 16/20, 274 yards, 2 TD |
| South Carolina | Rushing | LaNorris Sellers | 8 carries, 82 yards, 2 TD |
| South Carolina | Receiving | Jayden Sellers | 4 receptions, 127 yards, TD |

=== James Madison ===
James Madison Dukes (10-1) at Coastal Carolina Chanticleers (6-5) – Game summary

| Quarter | 1 | 2 | 3 | 4 | Total |
|---|---|---|---|---|---|
| Dukes | 17 | 3 | 11 | 28 | 59 |
| Chanticleers | 0 | 10 | 0 | 0 | 10 |

at Brooks Stadium • Conway, SC

- Date: November 29, 2025
- Game time: 3:45 p.m.
- Game weather: Sunny • Temperature: 47 °F (8 °C) • Wind: SW 6 mph
- Game attendance: 15,137
- Referee: Steven Robinson
- TV announcers (ESPNU): Justin Kutcher (play-by-play) and Rene Ingoglia (analyst)

Game information

First quarter

- (10:36) JMU – Alonza Barnett III 3-yard run, Morgan Suarez kick (Drive: 6 plays, 50 yards, 2:59; James Madison 7–0)
- (5:56) JMU – Morgan Suarez 33-yard field goal (Drive: 7 plays, 44 yards, 3:27; James Madison 10–0)
- (0:31) JMU – Braeden Wisloski 39-yard pass from Alonza Barnett III, Morgan Suarez kick (Drive: 5 plays, 67 yards, 2:19; James Madison 17–0)

Second quarter

- (11:21) JMU – Morgan Suarez 47-yard field goal (Drive: 7 plays, 14 yards, 3:39; James Madison 20–0)
- (7:57) CCU – Kian Afrookhteh 34-yard field goal (Drive: 10 plays, 58 yards, 3:24; James Madison 20–3)
- (2:59) CCU – Bryson Graves 12-yard pass from Tad Hudson, Kian Afrookhteh kick (Drive: 5 plays, 60 yards, 1:37; James Madison 20–10)

Third quarter

- (10:15) JMU – Morgan Suarez 21-yard field goal (Drive: 8 plays, 36 yards, 4:36; James Madison 23–10)
- (5:17) JMU – Lacota Dippre 25-yard pass from Alonza Barnett III, Alonza Barnett III pass to Nick DeGennaro for two-point conversion (Drive: 7 plays, 57 yards, 3:00; James Madison 31–10)

Fourth quarter

- (14:55) JMU – Isaiah Alston 9-yard pass from Alonza Barnett III, Morgan Suarez kick (Drive: 7 plays, 75 yards, 3:17; James Madison 38–10)
- (10:40) JMU – Jobi Malary 73-yard run, Morgan Suarez kick (Drive: 2 plays, 78 yards, 0:50; James Madison 45–10)
- (9:25) JMU – KJ Flowe 34-yard interception return, Morgan Suarez kick (Drive: 3 plays, 5 yards, 1:15; James Madison 52–10)
- (4:02) JMU – Morgan Scott 32-yard pass from Matthew Sluka, Morgan Suarez kick (Drive: 6 plays, 37 yards, 4:12; James Madison 59–10)

| Statistics | JMU | CCU |
|---|---|---|
| First downs | 24 | 10 |
| Plays–yards | 70–525 | 22–170 |
| Rushes–yards | 48–286 | 62–(-5) |
| Passing yards | 239 | 175 |
| Passing: Comp–Att–Int | 16–22–1 | 18–40–1 |
| Turnovers | 1 | 1 |
| Time of possession | 36:04 | 23:56 |

| Team | Category | Player | Statistics |
|---|---|---|---|
| James Madison | Passing | Alonza Barnett III | 15/21, 207 yards, 3 TD, INT |
| James Madison | Rushing | Jobi Malary | 12 carries, 154 yards, TD |
| James Madison | Receiving | Braeden Wisloski | 4 receptions, 64 yards, TD |
| Coastal Carolina | Passing | Tad Hudson | 16/38, 148 yards, TD, INT |
| Coastal Carolina | Rushing | Ja'Vin Simpkins | 6 carries, 5 yards |
| Coastal Carolina | Receiving | Karmello English | 2 receptions, 46 yards |

=== vs. Louisiana Tech (Independence Bowl) ===
2025 Radiance Technologies Independence Bowl
Coastal Carolina Chanticleers (6–6) vs. Louisiana Tech Bulldogs (7–5) – Game summary

| Quarter | 1 | 2 | 3 | 4 | Total |
|---|---|---|---|---|---|
| Chanticleers | 7 | 7 | 0 | 0 | 14 |
| Bulldogs | 0 | 3 | 3 | 17 | 23 |

at Independence Stadium • Shreveport, LA

- Date: December 30
- Game time: 2:00 p.m. EST
- Game weather: Sunny • Temperature: 44 °F (7 °C) • Wind: NNW at 4 mph (6.4 km/h)
- Game attendance: 30,298
- Referee: Patrick Foy (Mountain West)
- TV announcers (ESPN): Clay Matvick (play-by-play), Chase Daniel (analyst) and Harry Lyles Jr. (sideline)

Game information

First quarter

- CCU – Dominic Knicely 20-yard pass from Tad Hudson (Kian Afrookhteh kick), 1:12. Chanticleers 7–0. Drive: 8 plays, 80 yards, 4:26.

Second quarter

- LT – Kaegan Kent 42-yard field goal, 2:49. Chanticleers 7–3. Drive: 11 plays, 46 yards, 5:26.
- CCU – Roddy Washington 16-yard pass from Tad Hudson (Kian Afrookhteh kick), 1:16. Chanticleers 14–3. Drive: 6 plays, 75 yards, 1:33.

Third quarter

- LT – John Hoyet Chance 51-yard field goal, 11:45. Chanticleers 14–6. Drive: 4 plays, -1 yards, 2:10.

Fourth quarter

- LT – Marlion Jackson 52-yard pass from Trey Kukuk (pass failed), 11:45. Chanticleers 14–12. Drive: 1 play, 52 yards, 0:11.
- LT – Andrew Burnette 1-yard run (Trey Kukuk pass to Andrew Burnette), 8:09. Bulldogs 20–14. Drive: 3 plays, 34 yards, 1:23.
- LT – Kaegan Kent 35-yard field goal, 0:56. Bulldogs 23–14. Drive: 4 plays, 3 yards, 0:56.

| Statistics | CCU | LT |
|---|---|---|
| First downs | 19 | 12 |
| Plays–yards | 74–356 | 66–295 |
| Rushes–yards | 25–45 | 47–181 |
| Passing yards | 311 | 114 |
| Passing: Comp–Att–Int | 25–49–2 | 9–19–1 |
| Turnovers | 3 | 4 |
| Time of possession | 28:08 | 31:52 |

| Team | Category | Player | Statistics |
|---|---|---|---|
| Coastal Carolina | Passing | Tad Hudson | 25/49, 311 yards, 2 TD, 2 INT |
| Coastal Carolina | Rushing | Jevon Edwards | 9 carries, 36 yards |
| Coastal Carolina | Receiving | Bryson Graves | 6 receptions, 99 yards |
| Louisiana Tech | Passing | Trey Kukuk | 9/19, 114 yards, TD, INT |
| Louisiana Tech | Rushing | Trey Kukuk | 19 carries, 121 yards |
| Louisiana Tech | Receiving | Marlion Jackson | 3 receptions, 87 yards, TD |
