= List of Big South Conference football champions =

This is a list of Big South Conference football champions. Formed in 1983, the Big South did not sponsor football until 2002. It was not until 2010 that the Big South got an automatic bid to send its champion to the NCAA Division I Football Championship.

== Champions by year ==
		Record		
Year	Champions	Conference	Overall	Playoffs
2002	Gardner–Webb	3–0	9–1	—
2003	Gardner–Webb	4–0	8–4	—
2004	Coastal Carolina	4–0	10–1	—
2005	Charleston Southern	3–1	7–4	—
2005	Coastal Carolina	3–1	9–2	—
2006	Coastal Carolina	4–0	9–3	Lost FCS First Round vs. Appalachian State, 45–28
2007	Liberty	4–0	8–3	—
2008	Liberty	5–0	10–2	—
2009	Stony Brook	5–1	6–5	—
2009	Liberty	5–1	8–3	—
2010	Coastal Carolina	5–1	6–5	Lost FCS First Round vs. Western Illinois, 17–10
2010	Stony Brook	5–1	6–5	—
2010	Liberty	5–1	8–3	—
2011	Stony Brook	6–0	8–3	Won FCS First Round vs. Albany, 31–28; Lost FCS Second Round vs. Sam Houston St., 34–27
2012	Coastal Carolina	5–1	7–4	Won FCS First Round vs. Bethune-Cookman, 24–14; Lost FCS Second Round vs. Old Dominion, 63–35
2012	Stony Brook	5–1	9–2	Won FCS First Round vs. Villanova, 20–10; Lost FCS Second Round vs. Montana State, 16–10
2012	Liberty	5–1	6–5	—
2013	Coastal Carolina	4–1	12–3	Won FCS First Round vs. Bethune-Cookman, 48–24; Won FCS Second Round vs. Montana, 42–35; Lost FCS Quarterfinals vs. North Dakota State, 48–14
2013	Liberty	4–1	8–4	—
2014	Liberty	4–1	9–5	Won FCS First Round vs. James Madison, 26–21; Lost FCS Second Round vs. Villanova, 29–22
2014	Coastal Carolina	4–1	12–2	Won FCS Second Round vs. Richmond, 36–15; Lost FCS Quarterfinals vs. North Dakota State, 39–32

Italics indicate a team that won the tiebreaker to get the Big South's automatic bid to the NCAA Division I Football Championship tournament.

== Championships by team ==
School	Years in Big South	Championships	Last championship
Coastal Carolina	2003–present	7	2014
Liberty	2002–present	7	2014
Stony Brook	2008–2012	4	2012
Gardner–Webb	2002–present	2	2003
Charleston Southern	2002–present	2	2005
VMI	2003–2013	0	—
Presbyterian	2008–present	0	—
Elon	2002–2003	0	—
