= 2025 Independence Bowl =

Postseason college football bowl game

2025 Radiance Technologies Independence Bowl
- 49th Independence Bowl
Coastal Carolina Chanticleers	Louisiana Tech Bulldogs
(6–6)	(7–5)
Sun Belt	Conference USA
14	23
Head coach: Jeremiah Johnson (interim)	Head coach: Sonny Cumbie
	1	2	3	4	Total
Coastal Carolina	7	7	0	0	14
Louisiana Tech	0	3	3	17	23
- Date: December 30, 2025
- Season: 2025
- Stadium: Independence Stadium
- Location: Shreveport, Louisiana
- MVP: Off.: Trey Kukuk (QB, Louisiana Tech; Def.: Sifa Leota (LB, Louisiana Tech)
- Favorite: Louisiana Tech by 10
- Referee: Patrick Foy (Mountain West)
- Attendance: 30,298

United States TV coverage
- Network: ESPN
- Announcers: Clay Matvick (play-by-play), Chase Daniel (analyst), and Harry Lyles Jr. (sideline)

The 2025 Independence Bowl was a college football bowl game played on December 30, 2025, at Independence Stadium located in Shreveport, Louisiana. The 49th annual Independence Bowl began at approximately 1:00 p.m. CST and aired on ESPN. The Independence Bowl was one of the 2025–26 bowl games concluding the 2025 FBS football season. The game was sponsored by engineering services company Radiance Technologies and was officially known as the Radiance Technologies Independence Bowl.

The Louisiana Tech Bulldogs from the Conference USA defeated the Coastal Carolina Chanticleers from the Sun Belt Conference, 23–14.

== Teams ==
While the bowl had tie-ins with the Big 12 Conference and Conference USA (C-USA), the announced matchup featured Louisiana Tech from C-USA and Coastal Carolina from the Sun Belt Conference.

=== Coastal Carolina Chanticleers ===
Coastal Carolina began their season with three losses in their first five games, then had a four-game winning streak; their record stood at 6–3 through November 8. The Chanticleers lost their final three regular-season games, and entered the Independence Bowl with a 6–6 record.

=== Louisiana Tech Bulldogs ===
Louisiana Tech won four of their first five games, losing only to third-ranked LSU. Four losses in their next five games gave them a record of 5–5 in mid-November. The Bulldogs finished their regular season with back-to-back wins and entered the Independence Bowl with a 7–5 record.

== Game summary ==
2025 Radiance Technologies Independence Bowl

Quarter	1	2	3	4	Total
Coastal Carolina	7	7	0	0	14
Louisiana Tech	0	3	3	17	23

at Independence Stadium • Shreveport, Louisiana

- Date: Tuesday, December 30, 2025
- Game time: 1:00 p.m. CST
- Game weather: Sunny • Temperature: 48 °F (9 °C) • Wind: 7 mph (11 km/h) northwest
- Game attendance: 30,298
- Referee: Patrick Foy
- TV announcers (ESPN): Clay Matvick (play-by-play), Chase Daniel (analyst), and Harry Lyles Jr. (sideline)
- Box score

=== Statistics ===
Statistics	CCU	LT
First downs	19	12
Plays–yards	74–356	66–295
Rushes–yards	25–45	47–181
Passing yards	311	114
Passing: comp–att–int	25–49–2	9–19–1
Time of possession	28:08	31:52

Team	Category	Player	Statistics
Coastal Carolina	Passing	Tad Hudson	25/49, 311 yards, 2 TD, 2 INT
Coastal Carolina	Rushing	Jevon Edwards	9 carries, 36 yards
Coastal Carolina	Receiving	Bryson Graves	6 receptions, 99 yards
Louisiana Tech	Passing	Trey Kukuk	9/19, 114 yards, 1 TD, 1 INT
Louisiana Tech	Rushing	Trey Kukuk	19 carries, 121 yards
Louisiana Tech	Receiving	Marlion Jackson	3 receptions, 87 yards, 1 TD
