= Joe Moglia =

American football coach and businessman

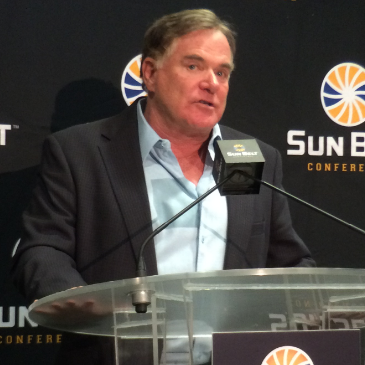
- Moglia in 2016

Biographical details
- Born: April 1, 1949 (age 77); New York City, U.S.
- Education: Fordham

Coaching career (HC unless noted)
- 1968–1970: Fordham Prep (NY) (assistant)
- 1971–1974: Archmere Academy (DE)
- 1975–1978: Penncrest HS (PA)
- 1978–1980: Lafayette (assistant)
- 1981–1983: Dartmouth (DC)
- 2009–2010: Nebraska (assistant)
- 2011: Omaha Nighthawks
- 2012–2016: Coastal Carolina
- 2018: Coastal Carolina

Head coaching record
- Overall: 56–22 (college)
- Tournaments: 4–4 (NCAA D-I playoffs)

Accomplishments and honors

Championships
- 4 Big South (2012–2014; 2016*)

Awards
- 2010-19 Big South Football All-Decade Team; South Carolina Football Hall of Fame Humanitarian of the Year (2015); Eddie Robinson Award (2015); AFCA FCS Region 2 Coach of the Year (2014); Big South Coach of the Year (2014); Big South Coach of the Year (2012)

Joseph Hugh Moglia (born April 1, 1949) is an American businessman and former football coach. He was head football coach at Coastal Carolina University from 2012 to 2016 and again in 2018 after spending the 2017 season on medical leave. During his tenure, the Coastal Carolina Chanticleers transitioned from the NCAA Division I Football Championship Subdivision (FCS) to the NCAA Division I Football Bowl Subdivision (FBS). In six seasons, Coastal Carolina compiled a record of 56–22.

Moglia is the former chairman and former CEO of TD Ameritrade. Moglia is the author of two books: The Perimeter Attack Offense and Coach Yourself to Success: Winning the Investment Game.

== Early career ==
Moglia attended Fordham Preparatory School in the Bronx from 1963 to 1967. He earned his bachelor's degree in economics from Fordham University and his master's degree in secondary education from the University of Delaware. He was a football coach for 16 years, finishing as the defensive coordinator at Dartmouth College from 1981 to 1983, leaving Lafayette College although then new head coach Bill Russo had asked him to stay on after HC Neil Putnam was let go in November 1980 following a 3–7 mark that season. Putnam's DC Joe Sarra was retained by Coach Russo who was hired December 1980.

After the 1983 football season ended, Moglia decided to start a second career on Wall Street. Moglia joined the Merrill Lynch MBA training program. There were twenty-six trainees, twenty-five MBA graduates and one football coach.

== Business career ==
Moglia spent 17 years at Merrill Lynch, where he was a member of the executive committees for both the institutional business and the private client business. Before leaving to take the role of chief executive officer at Ameritrade Holding Corp (now TD Ameritrade) in 2001, he was responsible for all investment products, the insurance company, the 401(k) business and the middle-market business.

In his seven years at TD Ameritrade, Moglia and his executive management team oversaw the company as its client assets grew from $24 billion to over $300 billion, increased its market capitalization from $700 million to $12 billion and produced five consecutive years of record earnings performance. He has also helped the company capitalize on merger and acquisition opportunities, including two of the largest in the discount brokerage industry: Datek Online Holdings in September 2002 and TD Waterhouse in January 2006.

In March 2008, citing the desire to pursue other interests, Moglia announced he would be vacating the CEO position in the coming fall. A search for his successor took place over the spring and summer. In September 2008, Moglia officially stepped down from his CEO position at TD Ameritrade. Fred Tomczyk, the former COO at TD Bank Financial Group, succeeded him. Not completely leaving the company, Moglia became the new chairman, succeeding J. Joseph Ricketts. It was the first time in the company's history where no member of the Ricketts family was a member of the management team, outside of the few that remain as independent directors on the board of directors. Moglia resigned as Chairman of TD Ameritrade in late 2020 when the merger with Charles Schwab Corporation was announced.

Moglia founded Fundamental Global Investors in 2012 alongside Kyle Cerminara, and has been chairman to date. In July 2020, the pair co-founded a special purpose acquisition company, FG New America Acquisition Corp, where Moglia is chairman and a partner.

== Return to coaching ==
After stepping down as CEO, Moglia began work for the University of Nebraska–Lincoln as executive advisor to the head football coach under Bo Pelini. On November 10, 2010, Moglia was named as the head coach of the new United Football League franchise, the Virginia Destroyers. On January 12, 2011, he was then named president and head coach of the Omaha Nighthawks, whose venue happened to be TD Ameritrade Park Omaha.

As the UFL's financial position deteriorated, Moglia signed with Coastal Carolina on December 20, 2011, replacing David Bennett. In his first season with Coastal, he led the team to win the 2012 Big South Conference Championship and was named 2012 Big South Conference Coach of the Year. After the 2015 Big South season, the Chanticleers program began the transition to FBS, the highest level of college competition. Coastal Carolina joined the Sun Belt Conference for non-football sports in July 2016, and became Sun Belt football members in 2017, the second and final year of the FBS transition. They were not eligible for bowl games or the Sun Belt football title during this period. On July 28, 2017, Moglia went on medical leave; the school announced on January 5, 2018, that he had been medically cleared to return to full-time coaching. Jamey Chadwell, whom Moglia had hired as his new offensive coordinator in January 2017, was Coastal's interim head coach during Moglia's leave.

== Retirement from coaching ==
On January 18, 2019, Moglia announced that he would be stepping down as head coach of the Coastal Carolina Chanticleers football team and turn the head coach position over to Jamey Chadwell, who was his offensive coordinator and as interim coach during his leave of absence. Moglia stated that even though his contract runs until 2021, he believed that it was in the best interest of the program to do so.

On September 7, 2021, it was announced that Joe Moglia would make a large financial gift to Coastal Carolina University that will help begin design work on a $15 million indoor football practice facility, expanded the universities football facilities, and start on a proposed football south end zone project. The gift will also help complete funding for a $5 million men’s and women’s soccer stadium. Neither the university nor Moglia have disclosed the amount of the donation. CCU President Michael T. Benson announced that a soon-to-be-designed academic and athletic facility would be named The Joe Moglia Center.

During the homecoming football game on October 7, 2023, his Alma Mater Fordham University renamed Jack Coffey Field as Joe Moglia Stadium.

== Head coaching record ==
=== College ===
Year	Team	Overall	Conference	Standing	Bowl/playoffs	Coaches^{#}	TSN/STATS^{°}
Coastal Carolina Chanticleers (Big South Conference) (2012–2015)
2012	Coastal Carolina	8–5	5–1	T–1st	L NCAA Division I Second Round	24	24
2013	Coastal Carolina	12–3	4–1	T–1st	L NCAA Division I Quarterfinal	7	7
2014	Coastal Carolina	12–2	4–1	T–1st	L NCAA Division I Quarterfinal	5	5
2015	Coastal Carolina	9–3	4–2	2nd	L NCAA Division I First Round	17	16
Coastal Carolina Chanticleers (NCAA Division I FCS independent) (2016)
2016	Coastal Carolina	10–2				18	18
Coastal Carolina Chanticleers (Sun Belt Conference) (2018)
2018	Coastal Carolina	5–7	2–6	4th (East)			
Coastal Carolina:		56–22	19–11				
Total:		56–22					
National championship Conference title Conference division title or championship game berth
^{#}Rankings from final FCS Coaches Poll.; ^{°}Rankings from final The Sports Network/STATS FCS Polls (starting 2015).

=== United Football League ===
Team	Year	Regular season					Postseason			
Team	Year	Won	Lost	Ties	Win %	Finish	Won	Lost	Win %	Result
OMA	2011	1	3	0	.250	3rd	0	1	.000	4th
OMA total		1	3	0	.250		0	1	.000	
Total		1	3	0	.250		0	1	.000	
