= Jeremiah Johnson (American football coach) =

American football coach

Current position
- Title: Defensive backs coach
- Team: Kansas State
- Conference: Big 12

Biographical details
- Born: Lawrence, Kansas
- Education: University of Kansas; Loras College

Coaching career (HC unless noted)
- 2002: Wyoming (GA)
- 2003–2006: Loras (WR/Secondary)
- 2007–2008: Northern Iowa (Video coordinator)
- 2009–2012: Northern Iowa (DB/LB)
- 2013–2021: Northern Iowa (DC/DB)
- 2022: Kent State (DC)
- 2023: Northern Iowa (DC)
- 2024: Louisiana Tech (DC)
- 2025: Coastal Carolina (Interim HC/DC)
- 2026–present: Kansas State (DB)

Head coaching record
- Overall: 0–1
- Bowls: 0–1

Jeremiah Johnson is an American football coach who is currently the defensive backs coach for Kansas State. A graduate of the University of Kansas and Loras College, he has served in various assistant coaching roles since 2002 and served as interim head coach for Coastal Carolina during the 2025 season .

== Head coaching record ==
Year	Team	Overall	Conference	Standing	Bowl/playoffs
Coastal Carolina Chanticleers (Sun Belt Conference) (2025)
2025	Coastal Carolina	0–1	0–0		L Independence
Coastal Carolina:		0–1	0–0		
Total:		0–1			
