= Coastal Carolina Chanticleers football =

Football team of Coastal Carolina University

Coastal Carolina Chanticleers
2026 Coastal Carolina Chanticleers football team
- First season: 2003; 23 years ago
- Head coach: Ryan Beard; 1st season, 4–6 (.400)
- Location: Conway, South Carolina
- Stadium: Brooks Stadium (capacity: 21,000)
- Field: James C. Benton Field
- NCAA division: Division I FBS
- Conference: Sun Belt
- Division: East
- Colors: Teal, bronze, and black
- All-time record: 182–109 (.625)
- Bowl record: 2–3 (.400)

Conference championships
- Big South: 2004, 2005, 2006, 2010, 2012, 2013, 2014 SBC: 2020

Division championships
- SBC East: 2020, 2022
- Consensus All-Americans: 1
- Rivalries: Liberty (rivalry); Appalachian State(rivalry)
- Mascot: Chauncey
- Outfitter: Under Armour
- Website: GoCCUsports.com

The Coastal Carolina Chanticleers football team represents Coastal Carolina University in college football at the NCAA Division I Football Bowl Subdivision level. The Chanticleers are members of the Sun Belt Conference, fielding its teams at the FBS level since 2017. The Chanticleers play their home games at James C. Benton Field at Brooks Stadium in Conway, South Carolina, United States.

Their head coach is Ryan Beard, who was hired following the firing of Tim Beck.

== History ==
It was announced in the late 1990s that CCU would establish a football squad in the coming years. The Coastal Carolina Chanticleers football program played its inaugural season in 2003 on campus at Brooks Stadium. The team's first coach was David Bennett, who held the position from the team's inception until December 9, 2011.

In the program's short history, the team has defeated such traditional Football Championship Subdivision (FCS) powers as James Madison University (ranked No. 1 at the time), Furman University, Wofford College, and the University of Montana. The program has won seven Big South Conference championships and has had several former players enter professional NFL careers.

Coastal's primary football rivals in FCS play were Liberty and Charleston Southern.

Coastal Carolina's first season as a full FBS member was in 2017. In 2020, the team won a share of its first Sun Belt championship and made its first bowl appearance, a 37-34 defeat to rival Liberty in the Cure Bowl. Coastal won its first bowl game the following season, returning to the Cure Bowl and defeating Northern Illinois, 47-41.

=== David Bennett era (2003–2011) ===
In 2006, the Chanticleers made school history when the team received its first FCS playoff berth, also the first playoff berth for the Big South Conference, losing a first-round contest to Appalachian State. Appalachian State would go on to win the FCS national championship that season.

In 2010, Coastal went to the playoffs for the second time after winning the Big South Championship (a three-way tie with Liberty and Stony Brook) and received the Big South's first-ever automatic playoff bid.

On September 11, 2010, Coastal Carolina played a five-overtime game on the road against the Towson Tigers, the longest game in school history. Coastal would lose the game, 47–45.

Bennett was dismissed following the 2011 season. University president David A. DeCenzo cited a 29-28 record during the previous five seasons—including only three wins against teams with winning records—and declining attendance as reasons for Bennett's removal.

=== Joe Moglia era (2012–18) ===
The university named Joe Moglia, former CEO of TD Ameritrade, as its new head coach on December 20, 2011.

Moglia found immediate success, leading the Chanticleers to a share of three consecutive Big South titles in his first three seasons and playoff berths in each of his first four seasons. In 2014, the team earned its first number 1 FCS ranking in program history after starting the season 11-0.

The Chanticleers left the Big South Conference at the end of the 2015–16 school year and joined the Sun Belt Conference, initially as a non-football member. At that time, the football team began a two-year transition to the Football Bowl Subdivision (FBS). The first season of the transition in 2016 was spent as an FCS independent; the Chanticleers officially joined Sun Belt football July 1, 2017, with full bowl eligibility following in 2018.

The Chanticleers earned the program's first win as an FBS program when they defeated the UMass Minutemen, 38-28, on September 2, 2017. The team had a tough time winning games during the 2017 season, losing its next nine games. Ending the 2017 season on a positive note, Coastal Carolina earned the program's first two Sun Belt Conference wins in the final two weeks of the season, a 13–7 victory over the Idaho Vandals and a 28-17 win against the Georgia Southern Eagles. Coastal finished the year with a record of 3–9. The 2017 team was led by interim head coach Jamey Chadwell, during a medical leave of absence from Moglia.

Building from their momentum at the end of the 2017 season, Coastal Carolina finished the 2018 season with an improved record of 5–7, with notable wins against the UAB Blazers, Louisiana Ragin' Cajuns, and Georgia State Panthers. Moglia retired from coaching following the 2018 season.

=== Jamey Chadwell era (2019–22) ===
Jamey Chadwell was introduced as the program's third head coach on January 18, 2019. He had previously served as the team's offensive coordinator and as its interim head coach for the 2017 season.

==== 2020 season ====
On October 14, 2020, Coastal Carolina got its first win against a ranked FBS team by defeating No. 21 Louisiana 30–27. Following the win, the AP ranked Coastal Carolina No. 25, making it their first time as a national ranked team. The same week, the College Football Playoff rankings listed Coastal at No. 20. For the remainder of the regular season, Coastal remained in the AP Top 25. Their highest AP ranking that year was #14 in the fourteenth week, with a CFP ranking of No. 18 the same week. Their original opponent for Week 14 (Dec 5th) was Liberty, but Liberty canceled the game citing concerns related to the COVID-19 pandemic. Coastal’s new opponent for that week became No. 13 BYU.

The undefeated Chanticleers created national attention and interest in the team, and their matchup with BYU led ESPN to broadcast College GameDay from Conway on December 5. Coastal won 22–17, with the game ending when BYU was stopped one yard short of the goal-line. The victory resulted in Coastal Carolina ranked No. 11 by the AP Top 25 Rankings and No. 13 by the CFP Playoffs for Week 15. With the conference championship game scheduled for December 19, CCU was set up for another showdown with Louisiana. However, they would have to settle for a co-championship with Louisiana, with both named champions after the Chanticleers found themselves unable to play when a positive COVID-19 test was found within the CCU team.

Coastal ended its season against Liberty in the first bowl game in team history, the Cure Bowl, losing 37–34 in overtime.

==== 2021 season ====
CCU was ranked No. 22 to start the season, and won their first six games to rise up to No. 15 before a loss to Appalachian State ended the streak. They won four of their next five games but finished second in the East Division. They were invited to the 2021 Cure Bowl where CCU defeated Northern Illinois 47-41 to earn the first bowl game victory in school history.

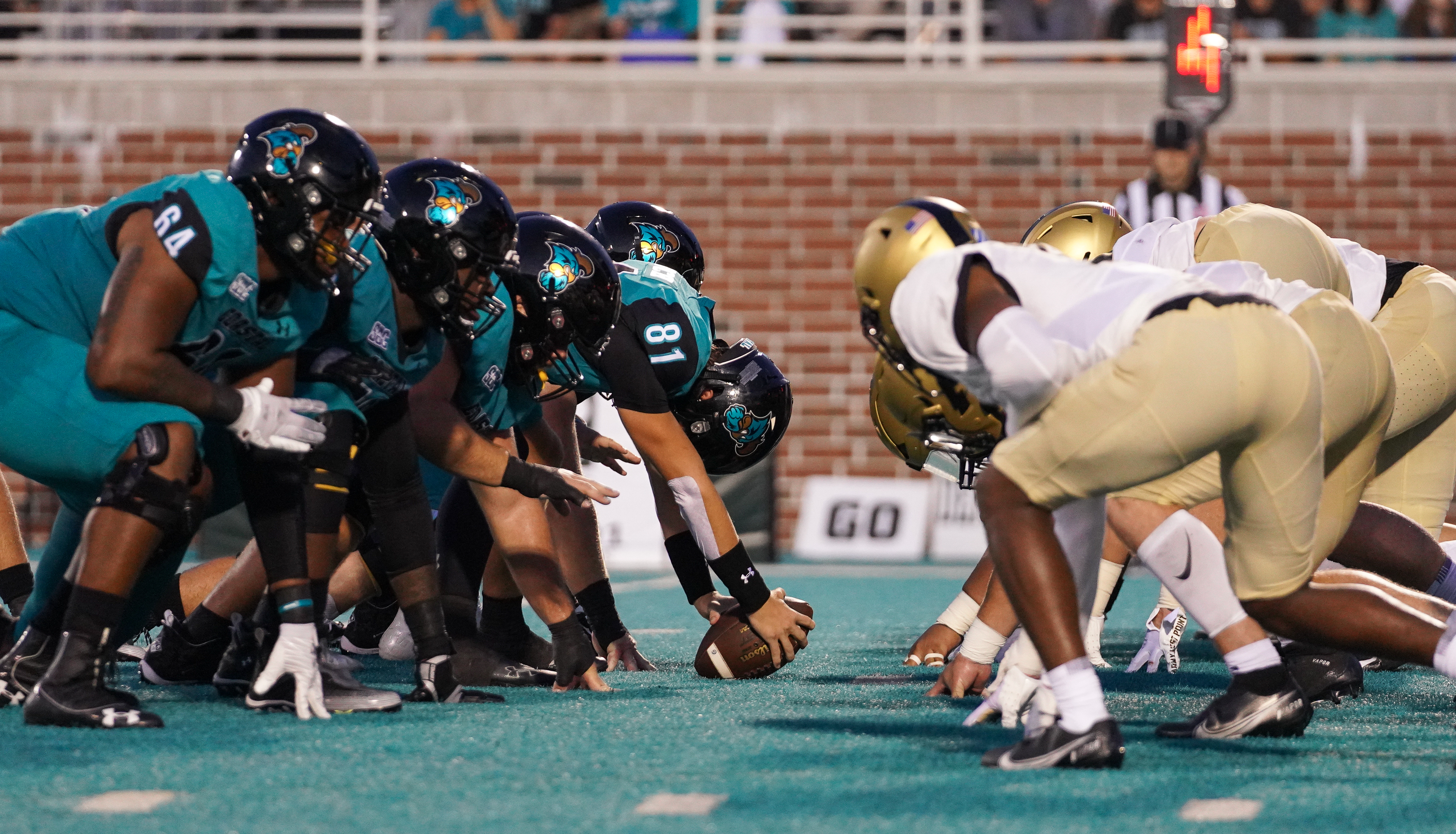
A game between Coastal Carolina and Army at Brooks Stadium in 2022

==== 2022 season ====
In 2022, Coastal finished 9-4, with losses to Troy in the Sun Belt championship game and East Carolina in the Birmingham Bowl. Prior to the bowl game, Chadwell announced that he was departing Coastal to accept the head coaching position at Liberty.

=== Tim Beck era (2023–2025) ===
On December 4, 2022, Tim Beck was announced as the program's fourth head coach following Chadwell's departure. Beck had most recently served as the offensive coordinator and quarterbacks coach for NC State.

The Chanticleers went 8-5 during Beck's first season in 2023. The team ended the season with its second bowl victory in program history, a 24-14 win against San Jose State in the Hawaii Bowl.

Beck was fired on November 30, 2025, with the announcement coming after their final game against James Madison. The university determined a change was needed despite finishing bowl-eligible at 6-6 for two straight regular seasons.

=== Ryan Beard era (2026–present) ===
Ryan Beard was hired on December 11, 2025.

== Conference affiliations ==
- Big South Conference (2003–2015)
- Independent (2016)
- Sun Belt Conference (2017–present)

== Championships ==
=== Conference championships ===
Coastal Carolina has won seven Big South Conference championships, winning two of them outright and five shared, and has won one Sun Belt Conference championship which was shared with Louisiana in the 2020 season. The 2020 Sun Belt Conference Football Championship Game was not played when Coastal Carolina was unable to participate due to the COVID-19 pandemic.

Season	Conference	Coach	Overall Record	Conference Record
2004	Big South Conference	David Bennett	10–1	4–0
2005†	Big South Conference	David Bennett	9–2	3–1
2006	Big South Conference	David Bennett	9–3	4–0
2010†	Big South Conference	David Bennett	6–6	5–1
2012†	Big South Conference	Joe Moglia	8–5	5–1
2013†	Big South Conference	Joe Moglia	12–3	4–1
2014†	Big South Conference	Joe Moglia	12–2	4–1
2020†	Sun Belt Conference	Jamey Chadwell	11–1	8–0

† Co-champions

=== Division championships ===
Coastal Carolina won their first division championship in the 2020 season.

Year	Division	Coach	Opponent	CG result
2020	Sun Belt Conference - East	Jamey Chadwell	Louisiana	No Contest
2022	Sun Belt Conference - East	Jamey Chadwell	Troy	L 26–45

^ The 2020 championship game was not played due to Coastal Carolina being impacted by the COVID-19 pandemic

== Rivalries ==
The Coastal Carolina Chanticleers football team has developed several rivalries since its inception. Here are some of the notable ones:

1. Appalachian State Mountaineers: This rivalry has grown as both teams have competed in the Sun Belt Conference. The games often carry significant implications for conference standings, making them highly anticipated matchups games between the two are often highly competitive.
2. Georgia Southern Eagles: Another key rival in the Sun Belt Conference, games against Georgia Southern are competitive and have a strong following among fans.
3. Liberty Flames: The rivalry with Liberty has been fueled by both teams' competitive spirit and proximity, creating an exciting atmosphere during their matchups.
4. South Carolina Gamecocks: Although not a traditional rivalry due to the difference in conference status and historical context, games against the Gamecocks are significant for Coastal Carolina, as they represent a chance to compete against a Power Five program.
5. The Citadel Bulldogs: This rivalry is rooted in the regional competition and has historical significance, as both teams have faced each other multiple times.

These rivalries contribute to the excitement of Coastal Carolina football and enhance the overall experience for players and fans alike.

=== Liberty ===
Coastal Carolina maintains a football rivalry with Liberty which began in 2003. The teams played every year from 2003 to 2016 and met in the 2020 Cure Bowl.

=== Appalachian State ===
The Football rivalry between the Coastal Carolina Chanticleers Football team and the Appalachian State Football team has been one of the most competitive rivalries in the Sun Belt Conference and a rivalry before Coastal Carolina joined the FBS.

==== History ====
The football rivalry between the Coastal Carolina Chanticleers and the Appalachian State Mountaineers began in 2005, however became big in 2017 following Coastal Carolina’s transition to the FBS and entry into the Sun Belt Conference. Since then, the series has featured competitive and closely contested matchups, with Appalachian State historically holding the upper hand early on. The first meeting ever in 2005 saw Coastal Carolina being held to only three points in a 30-3 away loss. The first meeting in the same division was played at Kidd Brewer Stadium in Boone, North Carolina, on October 21, 2017, and saw Appalachian State defeat Coastal Carolina 37–29. The following year, Coastal Carolina played at home at Brooks Stadium in Conway, South Carolina, but fell again, 23-7. This would be their first and only time they lost at home. In 2019, Appalachian State won 56–37 at home. In 2020, Coastal Carolina secured a 34–23 victory as the home team, their first in the rivalries' history. The 2021 contest in Boone ended with Appalachian State narrowly defeating Coastal Carolina 30–27. However, the series shifted as Coastal Carolina gained momentum, winning three consecutive games: in 2022, they defeated Appalachian State 35–28 at home; in 2023, they won a close 27–24 matchup on the road; and in 2024, Coastal Carolina achieved a decisive 38–24 victory at Brooks Stadium, marking their third straight win in the rivalry and improving their home record against Appalachian State to 3–1. In the most recent matchup on October 28, 2025, the Chanticleers won on the road 45-37. Overall, as of 2026, Appalachian State leads the rival series 7–5, but Coastal Carolina’s recent success has intensified the competition and elevated the rivalry within the Sun Belt Conference.

== Postseason games ==
=== NCAA Division I FCS playoffs ===
Coastal Carolina made six appearances in the NCAA Division I Football Championship playoffs before moving to the NCAA Division I Football Bowl Subdivision (FBS) in 2017, going 4–6.

Year	Round	Opponent	Result
2006	First Round	Appalachian State	L 28–45
2010	First Round	Western Illinois	L 10–17
2012	First Round; Second Round	Bethune–Cookman; Old Dominion	W 24–14; L 35–63
2013	First Round; Second Round; Quarterfinals	Bethune–Cookman; Montana; North Dakota State	W 48–24; W 42–35; L 14–48
2014	Second Round; Quarterfinals	Richmond; North Dakota State	W 36–15; L 32–39
2015	First Round	The Citadel	L 38–41

=== Bowl games ===
Coastal Carolina has participated in six bowl games, going 2–4.

Season	Coach	Bowl	Opponent	Result
2020	Jamey Chadwell	Cure Bowl	Liberty	L 34–37 ^{OT}
2021	Jamey Chadwell	Cure Bowl	Northern Illinois	W 47–41
2022	Chad Staggs (interim)	Birmingham Bowl	East Carolina	L 29–53
2023	Tim Beck	Hawaii Bowl	San Jose State	W 24–14
2024	Tim Beck	Myrtle Beach Bowl	UTSA	L 15–44
2025	Jeremiah Johnson (interim)	Independence Bowl	Louisiana Tech	L 14–23

== Head coaches ==
Coastal Carolina has had five head coaches.

Years	Coach	Record	Pct.
2003–2011	David Bennett	63–39	.618
2012–2016, 2018	Joe Moglia	56–22	.718
2017†, 2019–2022	Jamey Chadwell	39–22	.639
2022^	Chad Staggs	0–1	.000
2023–present	Tim Beck	20–15	.571

† Interim head coach in 2017 due to medical sabbatical taken by Joe Moglia.

^ Interim head coach for the 2022 Birmingham Bowl

== Individual award winners ==
=== National award winners – coaches ===
- AP Coach of the Year

FBS National Coach of the Year
2020: Jamey Chadwell

- Home Depot Coach of the Year

FBS National Coach of the Year
2020: Jamey Chadwell

- Walter Camp Coach of the Year

FBS National Coach of the Year
2020: Jamey Chadwell

- Eddie Robinson Coach of the Year

FBS National Coach of the Year
2020: Jamey Chadwell

- George Munger Award

FBS National Coach of the Year
2020: Jamey Chadwell

- Sporting News 2020 Coach of the Year

FBS National Coach of the Year
2020: Jamey Chadwell

- CBS Sports/247Sports Coach of the Year

FBS National Coach of the Year
2020: Jamey Chadwell

- Paul Bear Bryant Group of 5 2020 Conference Coach of the Year

FBS National Coach of the Year
2020: Jamey Chadwell

- Eddie Robinson Award

FCS National Coach of the Year
2015: Joe Moglia

- AFCA Assistant Coach of the Year

FBS National Assistant Coach of the Year
2021: Newland Isaac

=== Big South Conference honors ===
- Male Athlete of the Year

2013–14: Lorenzo Taliaferro
2014–15: Quinn Backus

- Offensive Player of the Year

2004: Patrick Hall
2006: Tyler Thigpen
2013: Lorenzo Taliaferro
2014: Alex Ross
2015: De'Angelo Henderson

- Defensive Player of the Year

2010: Andrae Jacobs
2012: Quinn Backus
2013: Quinn Backus
2014: Quinn Backus

- Special Teams Player of the Year

2013: Ladarius Hawthorne
2015: Devin Brown

- Freshman of the Year

2004: Jerome Simpson

- Coach of the Year

2004: David Bennett
2010: David Bennett
2012: Joe Moglia
2014: Joe Moglia

=== Sun Belt Conference honors ===
- Player of the Year

2022: Grayson McCall
2021: Grayson McCall
2020: Grayson McCall

- Defensive Player of the Year

2020: Tarron Jackson

- Freshman of the Year

2022: Jared Brown
2020: Grayson McCall

- Newcomer of the Year

2020: D'Jordan Strong

- Coach of the Year

2020: Jamey Chadwell

== Future non-conference opponents ==
Announced schedules as of October 13, 2026.

2027	2028	2029	2030	2031	2032	2033	2034
South Carolina State	at East Carolina	at Liberty	at Eastern Michigan	East Carolina	at East Carolina	at BYU	at East Carolina
at Oregon	Liberty	Delaware	at East Carolina			East Carolina	
at Liberty			Liberty				
East Carolina							
