= Ken Karcher =

American football player and coach (born 1963)

Wabash Little Giants
- Title: Offensive coordinator & quarterbacks coach

Personal information
- Born: July 1, 1963 (age 63); Pittsburgh, Pennsylvania, U.S.
- Listed height: 6 ft 3 in (1.91 m)
- Listed weight: 265 lb (120 kg)

Career information
- High school: Shaler Area (Shaler Township, Pennsylvania)
- College: Tulane
- NFL draft: 1986: undrafted

Career history

Playing
- Denver Broncos (1986)*; New Orleans Saints (1987)*; Denver Broncos (1987–1988); Kansas City Chiefs (1990)*
- * Offseason or practice squad member only

Coaching
- Idaho State (1989) Quarterbacks coach; North Texas (1991) Quarterbacks coach & wide receivers coach; Orlando Thunder (1992) Passing game coordinator & quarterbacks coach; Pittsburgh (1993–1996) Offensive coordinator & quarterbacks coach; Rhein Fire (1997–1999) Co-offensive coordinator & quarterbacks coach; Liberty (2000–2005) Head coach; Fellowship Christian HS (GA) (2006–2007) Offensive coordinator; Toledo (2008) Quarterbacks coach; Eastern Michigan (2009–2012) Offensive coordinator & quarterbacks coach; East Central (MS) (2013–2022) Head coach; Albertville HS (AL) (2023–2024) Offensive coordinator; Wabash (2026–present) Offensive coordinator & quarterbacks coach

Career NFL statistics
- Passing attempts: 114
- Passing completions: 62
- Completion percentage: 54.4%
- TD–INT: 6–4
- Passing yards: 756
- Passer rating: 78
- Stats at Pro Football Reference

Kenneth Paul Karcher (born July 1, 1963) is an American football coach and former professional quarterback. He is the offensive coordinator and quarterbacks coach for Wabash College, positions he has held since 2026. Before that, he served as the offensive coordinator for Albertville High School, a position he has held from 2023 to 2024. He was the head football coach for Liberty University from 2000 to 2005 and East Central Community College from 2013 to 2022. He played college football for Tulane and professionally for the Denver Broncos, New Orleans Saints, and Kansas City Chiefs of the National Football League (NFL). He also coached for Idaho State, North Texas, the Orlando Thunder of the NFL Europe, Pittsburgh, the Rhein Fire of the NFL Europe, Fellowship Christian School, Toledo, and Eastern Michigan.

== Early life and playing career ==
Out of Shaler Area High School, in Pennsylvania, Karcher was a highly recruited quarterback and eventually went to the University of Notre Dame. While there, he was a third-string quarterback behind Blair Kiel. He decided to transfer after two years to Tulane University, where he finished out his collegiate playing career.

Karcher went undrafted by NFL teams, and bounced around training camps before going to the Denver Broncos. He played in a total of four NFL games; three of those games came when he played as a replacement player while many other NFL players were on strike. The Broncos retained him for the rest of the year, and Karcher backed up John Elway while the team played in Super Bowl XXII. Karcher continued to play for the Broncos for one additional season, in 1988.

== Coaching career ==
Karcher began his coaching career in 1991 as an assistant coach at the University of North Texas, where he coached the Mean Green quarterbacks and receivers. The next year, he was hired by head coach Galen Hall as the passing game coordinator and quarterbacks coach for the Orlando Thunder of the World League of American Football. Following the suspension of the World League, Karcher returned to the college ranks as an assistant on Johnny Majors' coaching staff at the University of Pittsburgh. During his first season, he served as the Panthers' pass offense coordinator and quarterbacks coach, sharing coordinator duties with run offense coordinator Charles Coe. In March 1994, Majors put Karcher in sole charge of the offense, promoting him to offensive coordinator and quarterbacks coach. He held that position for the next three years, until Majors resignation at the end of the 1996 season.

In 1997, Karcher rejoined Galen Hall in the revamped World League, this time as the offensive coordinator and quarterbacks coach of the Rhein Fire, based in Düsseldorf, Germany. He helped lead the Fire to the first winning season in the team's three-year history. Rhein finished in first place with a record of 7–3, but lost to the Barcelona Dragons in World Bowl '97. Under his tutelage, quarterback T. J. Rubley earned all-World League honors and was named the league's offensive most valuable player. Karcher's offense led the league in rushing yards (1,555) and ranked second in total offense (3,253). The offensive line set a league record by holding their opponents to only one sack the entire regular season.

Karcher was named the sixth head football coach at Liberty University on February 18, 2000.

At Liberty, Karcher's teams underachieved. Despite this, Liberty chancellor Jerry Falwell resigned him to a 5-year contract after the 2004 season. However, after a 1–10 campaign in 2005, Karcher was fired. His final coaching record at Liberty was 21–46, with a 6–8 record in conference play (including two straight second places finishes). As of 2020, Karcher's winning percentage of .313 remains the worst win–loss percentage in the program's history.

As a coach, Karcher stressed building character in his players through football. One such player was Samkon Gado, a reserve while playing at Liberty. Karcher helped Gado get his foot in the door of an NFL team, and within the year Gado was the starting running back for the Green Bay Packers.

After his dismissal from Liberty, Karcher was the offensive coordinator at Fellowship Christian High School in Roswell, Georgia, where he led the Paladins to their first-ever winning season and a deep run in the Georgia state playoffs. He also served as the school's athletic director, and taught a 9th grade Bible class at Fellowship Christian School.

In 2008, Karcher accepted a position as the quarterbacks coach with the University of Toledo. He helped the Rockets in an upset win over the Michigan Wolverines, although the squad finished 3–8.

In January 2009, head coach Ron English hired Karcher as offensive coordinator and quarterbacks coach at Eastern Michigan University. The Eagles finished that year with a 0–12 record, and Karcher's offense ranked 116th out of 120 teams in total yards (3,340). Since then, EMU has improved, posting a 2–10 record the following year and a 6–6 record in 2011. EMU regressed in 2012 and finished the year 2–10. After the season, in which the Eagles finished near the bottom of the conference offensive statistics, Karcher left the program.

From 2013 to 2022, Karcher served as the head football coach for East Central Community College. He led the team to an overall record of 32–57.

In 2023, Karcher came out of retirement to be the offensive coordinator for Albertville High School.

== Personal life ==
Karcher is married to the former Pauline Termini and they have four children, daughters Kelly and Katie, and sons Austin and Clay.

== Head coaching record ==
=== College ===
Year	Team	Overall	Conference	Standing	Bowl/playoffs
Liberty Flames (NCAA Division I-AA independent) (2000–2001)
2000	Liberty	3–8			
2001	Liberty	3–8			
Liberty Flames (Big South Conference) (2002–2005)
2002	Liberty	2–9	1–2	3rd	
2003	Liberty	6–6	2–1	2nd	
2004	Liberty	6–5	3–1	2nd	
2005	Liberty	1–10	0–4	5th	
Liberty:		21–46	6–8		
Total:		21–46			

=== Junior college ===
Year	Team	Overall	Conference	Standing	Bowl/playoffs	NJCAA^{#}
East Central Warriors (Mississippi Association of Community and Junior Colleges) (2013–2022)
2013	East Central	1–8	0–5	(South)		
2014	East Central	3–6	2–4	(South)		
2015	East Central	8–3	4–2	T–2nd (South)	L MACJC Semifinal, W C.H.A.M.P.S. Heart of Texas	10
2016	East Central	5–5	5–1	1st (South)	L MACJC Semifinal	
2017	East Central	1–8	0–6	7th (South)		
2018	East Central	4–5	3–3	4th (South)		
2019	East Central	4–5	2–4	5th (South)		
2020–21	East Central	2–3	2–3	5th (South)		
2021	East Central	3–6	2–4	5th (South)		
2022	East Central	1–8	0–6	7th (South)		
East Central:		32–57	20–38			
Total:		32–57				
National championship Conference title Conference division title or championship game berth
