= David Bennett (American football) =

American football coach (born 1961)

Biographical details
- Born: December 2, 1961 (age 64); Greer, South Carolina, U.S.

Playing career
- 1981–1984: Presbyterian

Coaching career (HC unless noted)
- 1984: Presbyterian (SA)
- 1985–1986: Clemson (GA)
- 1987: Goose Creek HS (SC) (OC)
- 1988–1989: Newberry (OB)
- 1990–1994: Catawba (assistant)
- 1995–2001: Catawba
- 2002–2011: Coastal Carolina
- 2013–2016: River Bluff HS (SC)

Administrative career (AD unless noted)
- 2012–2013: Socastee (SC)
- 2013–2016: River Bluff HS (SC)
- 2017–2023: Lexington School District 1 (SC)

Head coaching record
- Overall: 126–56 (college); 23–21 (high school)
- Tournaments: 4–3 (NCAA D-II playoffs); 0–2 (NCAA D-I playoffs); 1–1 (SCHSL playoffs)

Accomplishments and honors

Championships
- 3 SAC (1996, 2000–2001); 4 Big South (2004–2005, 2010)

Awards
- AFCA Division II Coach of the Year (1995); SAC Coach of the Year (1995); 2× Big South Coach of the Year (2004, 2010)

David Bennett (born December 2, 1961) is an American former high school athletics administrator and football coach. He was most recently the athletic director for Lexington School District 1 in Lexington, South Carolina from 2017 to 2023. Bennett served as the head football coach at Catawba College from 1995 to 2001 and at Coastal Carolina University from 2003 to 2011.

== Playing career and education ==
Bennett played football and golf at Presbyterian College. He earned his bachelor's degree in history and social studies from Presbyterian in 1984. He added a master's degree in guidance and counseling from Clemson University.

== Coaching career ==
=== Coastal Carolina ===
Bennett was hired on December 21, 2001, as the Chanticleers' first head coach prior to the football program's launch season in 2003. Bennett led the Chanticleers to a victory in their inaugural game, September 6, 2003, with a 21–14 home win over the Newberry Wolves. In the second, third, and fourth seasons of his tenure, he led the Chanticleers to nine or more wins each year, only qualifying for the Football Championship Subdivision playoffs once in 2006 with an at-large berth, as the five-team Big South Conference had too few schools for an automatic bid.

On December 9, 2011, Bennett was relieved of his duties after the program slumped to a 29–28 record over his final five seasons. In nine years, Bennett's teams produced a 63–39 record playing at the NCAA Division I FCS level. Under his tenure, the Chanticleers reached the FCS playoffs twice, and finished in at least a tie for the Big South regular season title four times.

During his time at Coastal Carolina, Bennett gained notoriety for a portion of a press conference he gave on September 7, 2011 that went viral. In the clip, he referenced having instructed his players to be "more like [dogs]" and saying "we don't need no cats" while recounting an incident in which a neighborhood cat entered his house through a broken screen door but had difficulty exiting. The clip from the press conference was noted for its thorough detail of the incident and for Bennett's several attempts at recreating cat-like noises. The video has resurfaced several times in subsequent years, often on the anniversary of the original press conference, and resulted in several interviews and speaking opportunities for Bennett.

== Head coaching record ==
=== College ===
Year	Team	Overall	Conference	Standing	Bowl/playoffs	TSN^{#}
Catawba Indians (South Atlantic Conference) (1994–2001)
1995	Catawba	7–3	5–2	2nd		
1996	Catawba	9–2	6–1	1st		
1997	Catawba	8–3	5–2	2nd		
1998	Catawba	6–4	4–3	T–3rd		
1999	Catawba	11–2	7–1	2nd	L NCAA Division II Quarterfinal	
2000	Catawba	11–1	7–0	1st	L NCAA Division II Quarterfinal	
2001	Catawba	11–2	6–1	1st	L NCAA Division II Semifinal	
Catawba:		63–17	40–10			
Coastal Carolina Chanticleers (Big South Conference) (2003–2011)
2003	Coastal Carolina	6–5	1–3	4th		
2004	Coastal Carolina	10–1	4–0	1st		24
2005	Coastal Carolina	9–2	3–1	T–1st		24
2006	Coastal Carolina	9–3	4–0	1st	L NCAA Division I First Round	14
2007	Coastal Carolina	5–6	3–1	2nd		
2008	Coastal Carolina	6–6	1–4	T–5th		
2009	Coastal Carolina	5–6	3–3	T–4th		
2010	Coastal Carolina	6–6	5–1	T–1st	L NCAA Division I First Round	
2011	Coastal Carolina	7–4	3–3	T–3rd		
Coastal Carolina:		63–39	27–16			
Total:		126–56				
National championship Conference title Conference division title or championship game berth
^{#}Rankings from final Coaches Poll.

=== High school ===
Year	Team	Overall	Conference	Standing	Bowl/playoffs
River Bluff Gators (South Carolina High School League AAAAA–Region V) (2013–2016)
2013	River Bluff	7–3	No conference (first-year school)		
2014	River Bluff	8–5	3–2	T–2nd	L Second round, SCHSL playoffs
2015	River Bluff	7–4	2–3	T–3rd	
2016	River Bluff	1–9	0–6	7th	
River Bluff:		23–21	5–11		
Total:		23–21			
