= Coastal Carolina Chanticleers football statistical leaders =

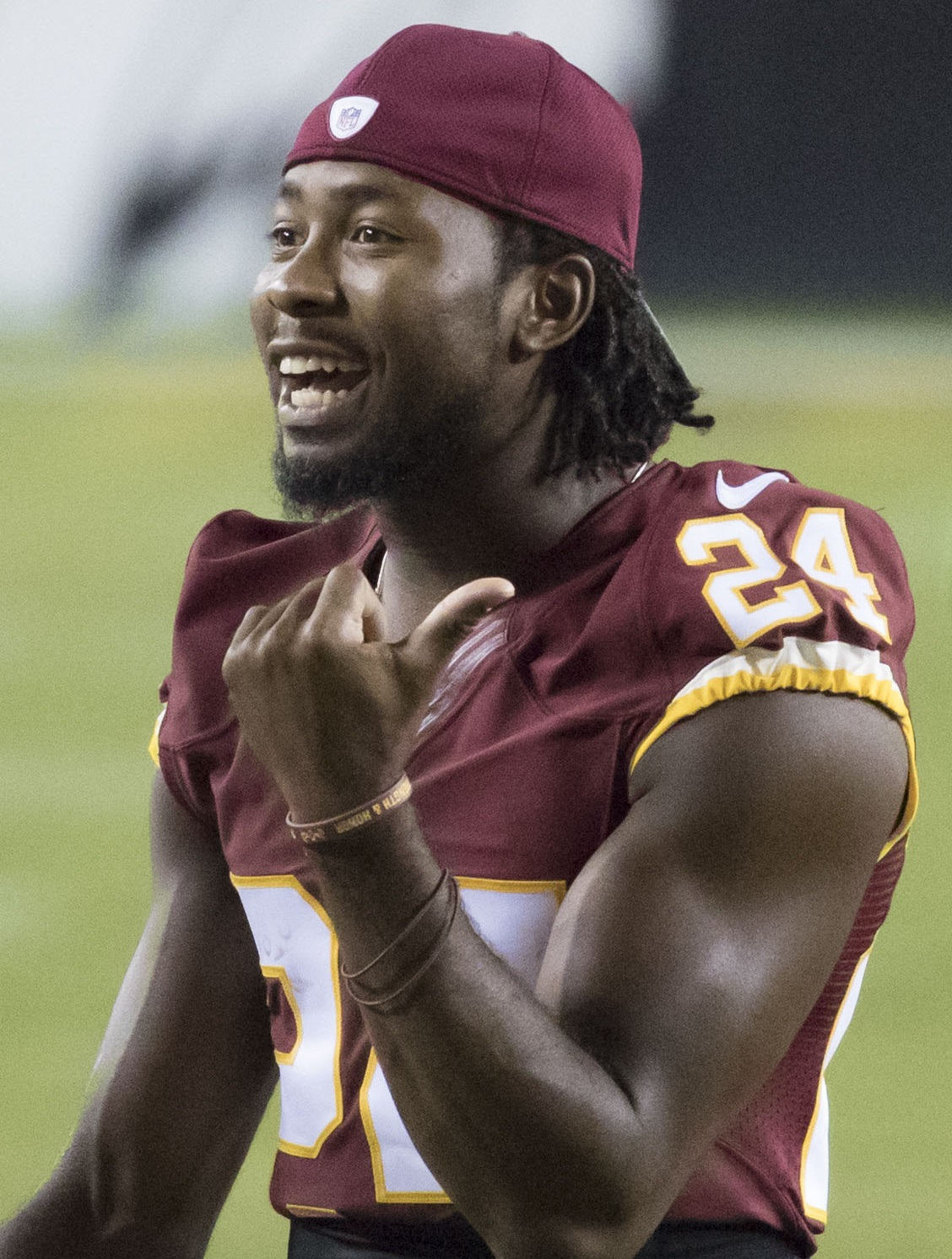
Josh Norman holds Coastal Carolina's single-season record for interceptions, with eight in 2009. He is second on the career leaderboard.

The Coastal Carolina Chanticleers football statistical leaders are individual statistical leaders of the Coastal Carolina Chanticleers football program in various categories, including passing, rushing, receiving, total offense, defensive stats, and kicking. Within those areas, the lists identify single-game, single-season, and career leaders. The Chanticleers represent Coastal Carolina University in the NCAA Division I Sun Belt Conference. Coastal joined the Sun Belt for non-football sports in 2016, began play in Sun Belt football in the second year of its transition to the Football Bowl Subdivision in 2017, and became a full FBS member in 2018.

Coastal Carolina began competing in intercollegiate football in 2003. This means that full box scores are available for all games, and there is no pre-modern era with incomplete statistics like there is for many college football teams. However, there are more entries on this list in more recent years, as the Chanticleers have played in more games per season, giving players more chances to accumulate statistics. Regular seasons in the NCAA Division I Football Championship Subdivision, in which Coastal participated from the program's creation in 2003 through 2016, normally consist of 11 games, instead of the 12 games allowed to FBS teams. However, two aspects of the FCS season structure allow the possibility of more games:

- First, the NCAA allows FCS programs to schedule 12 games instead of the regular 11 in years when the period starting with the Thursday before Labor Day and ending with the final Saturday in November contains 14 Saturdays. During Coastal's tenure in FCS, this happened in 2008, 2013, and 2014.
- More significantly, the FCS conducts a championship tournament, currently known as the NCAA Division I Football Championship. From 2003 through 2009, the tournament involved 16 teams. It expanded to 20 teams in 2010, and to its current 24 teams in 2013. Currently, a team that advances to the FCS championship game will play either four or five games, depending on whether it receives a first-round bye.

Under original head coach David Bennett, the Chanticleers were able to schedule 12 regular-season games once, reached the FCS playoffs twice in nine years, and averaged 11.3 games per season. Under Joe Moglia, head coach from 2012 to 2018 (with a medical leave in 2017), the Chanticleers were able to schedule 12 regular-season games twice as an FCS program, reached the FCS playoffs all four seasons in which they were eligible (due to their FBS transition, they were ineligible for the 2016 playoffs), and played in 13.2 games per season.

The Chanticleers were only able to play 11 regular-season games instead of the normal 12 in 2020 due to COVID-19, and an outbreak of cases in the team forced the cancellation of the 2020 Sun Belt Championship Game, for which it had qualified. Coastal has played two bowl games since moving to FBS—the 2020 and 2021 Cure Bowls.

These lists are updated through the 2025 season.

== Passing ==
=== Passing yards ===
Career
Rk	Player	Yards	Years
1	Grayson McCall	10,005	2019 2020 2021 2022 2023
2	Alex Ross	9,918	2012 2013 2014 2015
3	Tyler Thigpen	6,598	2003 2004 2005 2006
4	Zach MacDowall	6,360	2008 2009 2010
5	Aramis Hillary	4,546	2010 2011 2012
6	Ethan Vasko	2,899	2023 2024
7	Fred Payton	2,381	2018 2019 2020
8	Tyler Keane	2,249	2014 2015 2016 2017
9	William Richardson	2,177	2005 2006 2007 2008
10	Bryce Carpenter	1,927	2018 2019 2020 2021 2022

Single season
Rk	Player	Yards	Year
1	Alex Ross	3,389	2014
2	Tyler Thigpen	3,296	2006
3	Alex Ross	3,093	2013
4	Alex Ross	3,009	2015
5	Grayson McCall	2,873	2021
6	Grayson McCall	2,700	2022
7	Aramis Hillary	2,665	2012
8	Zach MacDowall	2,632	2010
9	Grayson McCall	2,488	2020
10	Ethan Vasko	2,120	2024

Single game
Rk	Player	Yards	Year	Opponent
1	Alex Ross	415	2015	The Citadel
2	Zach MacDowall	382	2008	Liberty
	Zach MacDowall	382	2010	Liberty
4	Grayson McCall	373	2023	Appalachian State
	Deuce Bailey	373	2026	West Virginia
6	Alex Ross	370	2014	Charlotte
7	Ethan Vasko	367	2024	Old Dominion
8	Grayson McCall	365	2021	Arkansas State
9	Grayson McCall	358	2022	Old Dominion
10	Aramis Hillary	356	2012	Toledo

=== Passing touchdowns ===
Career
Rk	Player	TDs	Years
1	Grayson McCall	88	2019 2020 2021 2022 2023
2	Alex Ross	72	2012 2013 2014 2015
3	Tyler Thigpen	53	2003 2004 2005 2006
4	Zach MacDowall	45	2008 2009 2010
5	Aramis Hillary	36	2010 2011 2012
6	Tyler Keane	21	2014 2015 2016 2017
	Fred Payton	21	2018 2019 2020
	Ethan Vasko	21	2023 2024
9	Bryce Carpenter	18	2018 2019 2020 2021 2022
10	William Richardson	16	2005 2006 2007 2008

Single season
Rk	Player	TDs	Year
1	Tyler Thigpen	29	2006
2	Grayson McCall	27	2021
3	Alex Ross	26	2013
	Grayson McCall	26	2020
5	Grayson McCall	24	2022
6	Aramis Hillary	21	2012
	Alex Ross	21	2015
8	Alex Ross	20	2014
	Zach MacDowall	20	2010
10	Zach MacDowall	16	2008

Single game
Rk	Player	TDs	Year	Opponent
1	Zach MacDowall	5	2010	Charleston Southern
	Aramis Hillary	5	2012	Presbyterian
	Alex Ross	5	2015	Kennesaw State
	Grayson McCall	5	2021	Texas State
5	9 times by 4 players	4	Most recent: Grayson McCall, 2021 vs. Northern Illinois (Cure Bowl)	

== Rushing ==
=== Rushing yards ===
Career
Rk	Player	Yards	Years
1	De'Angelo Henderson	4,635	2013 2014 2015 2016
2	C. J. Marable	2,691	2018 2019 2020
3	Aundres Perkins	2,343	2003 2004 2005 2006
4	Patrick Hall	2,214	2003 2004 2005
5	Lorenzo Taliaferro	2,086	2012 2013
6	Reese White	1,956	2019 2020 2021 2022 2023
7	Braydon Bennett	1,954	2020 2021 2022 2023 2024
8	Osharmar Abercrombie	1,922	2014 2015 2016 2017
9	Eric O’Neal	1,888	2007 2008 2009 2010
10	Mike Tolbert	1,670	2004 2005 2006 2007

Single season
Rk	Player	Yards	Year
1	Lorenzo Taliaferro	1,729	2013
2	De'Angelo Henderson	1,534	2014
3	De'Angelo Henderson	1,346	2015
4	De'Angelo Henderson	1,156	2016
5	Patrick Hall	1,107	2004
6	C. J. Marable	1,085	2019
7	Shermari Jones	1,040	2021
8	Jeremy Height	921	2012
9	C. J. Marable	887	2020
10	Aundres Perkins	863	2003

Single game
Rk	Player	Yards	Year	Opponent
1	Mike Tolbert	244	2007	VMI
2	Shermari Jones	211	2021	South Alabama
3	Lorenzo Taliaferro	205	2013	Elon
4	Aundres Perkins	202	2003	North Greenville
5	Patrick Hall	201	2003	Davidson
6	Patrick Hall	195	2004	Charleston Southern
7	De'Angelo Henderson	185	2016	Furman
8	Lorenzo Taliaferro	174	2013	Eastern Kentucky
9	De'Angelo Henderson	172	2014	South Carolina State
	C. J. Marable	172	2019	Louisiana–Monroe

=== Rushing touchdowns ===
Career
Rk	Player	TDs	Years
1	De'Angelo Henderson	58	2013 2014 2015 2016
2	Aundres Perkins	46	2003 2004 2005 2006
3	Lorenzo Taliaferro	32	2012 2013
4	C. J. Marable	29	2018 2019 2020
5	Braydon Bennett	24	2020 2021 2022 2023 2024
6	Reese White	23	2019 2020 2021 2022 2023
7	Osharmar Abercrombie	22	2014 2015 2016 2017
8	Mike Tolbert	21	2004 2005 2006 2007
9	Alex Ross	19	2012 2013 2014 2015
10	Patrick Hall	18	2003 2004 2005
	Grayson McCall	18	2019 2020 2021 2022 2023

Single season
Rk	Player	TDs	Year
1	Lorenzo Taliaferro	27	2013
2	De'Angelo Henderson	20	2014
3	De'Angelo Henderson	16	2015
	De'Angelo Henderson	16	2016
5	Aundres Perkins	14	2003
6	Patrick Hall	13	2004
	Shermari Jones	13	2021
8	Aundres Perkins	12	2004
	Aundres Perkins	12	2005
	C. J. Marable	12	2020

Single game
Rk	Player	TDs	Year	Opponent
1	Aundres Perkins	4	2004	Charleston Southern
	Lorenzo Taliaferro	4	2013	Liberty

== Receiving ==
=== Receptions ===
Career
Rk	Player	Rec	Years
1	Jaivon Heiligh	191	2018 2019 2020 2021
2	Matt Hazel	183	2010 2011 2012 2013
3	Bruce Mapp	168	2013 2014 2015 2016
4	Jerome Simpson	161	2004 2005 2006 2007
5	Tyrell Blanks	143	2012 2013 2014 2015
	Sam Pinckney	143	2022 2023
7	Isaiah Likely	133	2018 2019 2020 2021
8	Jared Brown	108	2021 2022 2023
9	Brandon Whitley	103	2007 2008 2009 2010
10	DeMario Bennett	97	2011 2012 2013
	De'Angelo Henderson	97	2013 2014 2015 2016

Single season
Rk	Player	Rec	Year
1	Sam Pinckney	72	2023
2	Bruce Mapp	71	2014
	Sam Pinckney	71	2022
4	Matt Hazel	70	2013
5	Jaivon Heiligh	66	2021
6	Jaivon Heiligh	65	2020
7	Jerome Simpson	61	2006
	Matt Hazel	61	2012
9	Isaiah Likely	59	2021
10	Jared Brown	58	2023

Single game
Rk	Player	Rec	Year	Opponent
1	Jaivon Heiligh	13	2020	Liberty (Cure Bowl)
2	Jaivon Heiligh	12	2019	Troy
3	Jaivon Heiligh	11	2020	Troy
	Sam Pinckney	11	2022	Troy
5	Rodney Burgess	10	2003	Jacksonville
	Jerome Simpson	10	2005	James Madison
	Niccolo Mastromatteo	10	2012	Eastern Kentucky
	Bruce Mapp	10	2014	Gardner-Webb
	Tyrell Blanks	10	2014	Charlotte
	Jaivon Heiligh	10	2021	Texas State

=== Receiving yards ===
Career
Rk	Player	Yards	Years
1	Jaivon Heiligh	2,825	2018 2019 2020 2021
2	Jerome Simpson	2,720	2004 2005 2006 2007
3	Matt Hazel	2,553	2010 2011 2012 2013
4	Bruce Mapp	2,438	2013 2014 2015 2016
5	Isaiah Likely	2,050	2018 2019 2020 2021
6	Sam Pinckney	2,023	2022 2023
7	Tyrell Blanks	1,806	2012 2013 2014 2015
8	Chris Jones	1,548	2014 2015 2016 2017
9	Malcolm Williams	1,534	2016 2017 2018
	Jared Brown	1,534	2021 2022 2023

Single season
Rk	Player	Yards	Year
1	Jaivon Heiligh	1,128	2021
2	Jerome Simpson	1,077	2006
3	Sam Pinckney	1,027	2023
4	Jaivon Heiligh	998	2020
5	Sam Pinckney	996	2022
6	Matt Hazel	990	2013
7	Bruce Mapp	959	2014
8	Isaiah Likely	912	2021
9	Matt Hazel	799	2012
10	John Israel	798	2014

Single game
Rk	Player	Yards	Year	Opponent
1	Malcolm Williams	266	2017	Louisiana-Monroe
2	Isaiah Likely	232	2021	Arkansas State
3	Jerome Simpson	207	2006	Georgia Southern
4	Jaivon Heiligh	178	2020	Liberty (Cure Bowl)
5	John Israel	174	2014	Charleston Southern
6	Chris Jones	168	2015	Liberty
7	Jerome Simpson	162	2005	James Madison
8	Matt Hazel	155	2012	Old Dominion
9	Jerome Simpson	151	2006	Furman
10	Niccolo Mastromatteo	151	2013	Gardner-Webb

=== Receiving touchdowns ===
Career
Rk	Player	TDs	Years
1	Jerome Simpson	44	2004 2005 2006 2007
2	Matt Hazel	28	2010 2011 2012 2013
3	Isaiah Likely	27	2018 2019 2020 2021
4	Jaivon Heiligh	22	2018 2019 2020 2021
5	Bruce Mapp	20	2013 2014 2015 2016
6	DeMario Bennett	14	2011 2012 2013
7	Brandon Whitley	13	2007 2008 2009 2010
8	Tyrell Blanks	12	2012 2013 2014 2015
	Malcolm Williams	12	2016 2017 2018
	C. J. Marable	12	2018 2019 2020

Single season
Rk	Player	TDs	Year
1	Jerome Simpson	16	2006
2	Isaiah Likely	12	2021
3	Jerome Simpson	11	2007
4	Jaivon Heiligh	10	2020
5	Jerome Simpson	9	2005
	Matt Hazel	9	2013
7	Jerome Simpson	8	2004
	Matt Hazel	8	2012
	Sam Pinckney	8	2023
10	DeMario Bennett	7	2012
	Bruce Mapp	7	2015
	Malcolm Williams	7	2017
	C. J. Marable	7	2020
	Jaivon Heiligh	7	2021

Single game
Rk	Player	TDs	Year	Opponent
1	Isaiah Likely	4	2021	Arkansas State
2	Jerome Simpson	3	2004	Charleston (WV)
	Matt Hazel	3	2010	Liberty

== Total offense ==
Total offense is the sum of passing and rushing statistics. It does not include receiving or returns.

=== Total offense yards ===
Career
Rk	Player	Yards	Years
1	Alex Ross	11,482	2012 2013 2014 2015
2	Grayson McCall	11,118	2019 2020 2021 2022 2023
3	Tyler Thigpen	8,236	2003 2004 2005 2006
4	Zach MacDowall	7,139	2008 2009 2010
5	Aramis Hillary	5,405	2010 2011 2012
6	De'Angelo Henderson	4,635	2013 2014 2015 2016
7	Ethan Vasko	3,714	2023 2024
8	Bryce Carpenter	2,833	2018 2019 2020 2021 2022
9	Fred Payton	2,786	2018 2019 2020
10	Tyler Keane	2,467	2014 2015 2016 2017

Single season
Rk	Player	Yards	Year
1	Alex Ross	4,080	2014
2	Tyler Thigpen	3,952	2006
3	Alex Ross	3,633	2013
4	Aramis Hillary	3,232	2012
5	Alex Ross	3,218	2015
6	Grayson McCall	3,163	2021
7	Grayson McCall	3,057	2020
8	Zach MacDowall	3,010	2010
9	Grayson McCall	2,895	2022
10	Ethan Vasko	2,567	2024

Single game
Rk	Player	Yards	Year	Opponent
1	Alex Ross	429	2015	The Citadel
2	Alex Ross	426	2014	Elon
	Alex Ross	426	2014	Charlotte
4	Tyler Thigpen	425	2006	Gardner-Webb
5	Grayson McCall	414	2020	Liberty (Cure Bowl)
6	Alex Ross	404	2012	Gardner-Webb
7	Zach MacDowall	398	2010	Liberty
8	Aramis Hillary	397	2012	Old Dominion
9	Deuce Bailey	392	2026	West Virginia
10	Zach MacDowall	386	2008	Stony Brook

=== Touchdowns responsible for ===
"Touchdowns responsible for" is the official NCAA term for combined passing and rushing touchdowns.

Career
Rk	Player	TDs	Years
1	Grayson McCall	106	2019 2020 2021 2022 2023
2	Alex Ross	91	2012 2013 2014 2015
3	Tyler Thigpen	66	2003 2004 2005 2006
4	Zach MacDowall	61	2008 2009 2010
5	De'Angelo Henderson	58	2013 2014 2015 2016
6	Aramis Hillary	49	2010 2011 2012
7	Aundres Perkins	46	2003 2004 2005 2006
8	Lorenzo Taliaferro	32	2012 2013

Single season
Rk	Player	TDs	Year
1	Tyler Thigpen	34	2006
2	Grayson McCall	33	2020
3	Alex Ross	32	2013
4	Grayson McCall	31	2021
5	Grayson McCall	30	2022
6	Alex Ross	29	2014
7	Zach MacDowall	28	2010
8	Lorenzo Taliaferro	27	2013
9	Aramis Hillary	25	2012
10	Alex Ross	24	2015

Single game
Rk	Player	TDs	Year	Opponent
1	Zach MacDowall	6	2010	Charleston Southern

== Defense ==
=== Interceptions ===
Career
Rk	Player	Ints	Years
1	Quinton Teal	17	2003 2004 2005 2006
2	Josh Norman	13	2008 2009 2010 2011
3	Marrio Norman	11	2004 2006 2007 2008
4	Dewitt Myers	10	2003 2004 2005 2006
5	Dominique Davenport	9	2006 2007 2008 2009 2010
6	Keon Cunningham	8	2007 2008 2009 2010
	Quinn Backus	8	2011 2012 2013 2014
8	Johnnie Houston	7	2010 2011 2012 2013
	Chandler Kryst	7	2017 2018 2019
	Alex Spillum	7	2018 2019 2020 2021

Single season
Rk	Player	Ints	Year
1	Josh Norman	8	2009
2	Quinton Teal	6	2004
	Dominique Davenport	6	2010
4	Quinton Teal	5	2005
	Marrio Norman	5	2007
	Alex Scearce	5	2016
	Chandler Kryst	5	2019
	D'Jordan Strong	5	2020

Single game
Rk	Player	Ints	Year	Opponent
1	Marrio Norman	3	2007	Presbyterian
	Josh Norman	3	2009	Gardner-Webb
	Dontavais Johnson	3	2012	North Carolina A&T
	Clayton Isbell	3	2023	UCLA

=== Tackles ===
Career
Rk	Player	Tackles	Years
1	Quinn Backus	441	2011 2012 2013 2014
2	Jamar Leath	364	2003 2004 2005 2006
3	Silas Kelly	339	2017 2018 2019 2020 2021
4	Teddy Gallagher	302	2018 2019 2020 2021
5	Maurice Simpkins	272	2003 2004 2005
6	Dominique Davenport	258	2006 2007 2008 2009 2010
7	Mike McClure	245	2010 2011 2012 2013
8	C.J. Brewer	230	2017 2018 2019 2020 2021
9	Quinton Teal	227	2003 2004 2005 2006
10	Pernell Williams	222	2011 2012 2013 2014

Single season
Rk	Player	Tackles	Year
1	Quinn Backus	144	2013
2	Quinn Backus	139	2012
3	Quinn Backus	127	2014
4	Jamar Leath	116	2006
5	Quinn Backus	109	2011
	Silas Kelly	109	2021
7	Jamar Leath	108	2005
8	Andrae Jacobs	104	2010
9	Maurice Simpkins	103	2003
10	JT Killen	95	2022

Single game
Rk	Player	Tackles	Year	Opponent
1	Marcellius Pulliam	22	2026	Old Dominion
2	Dominique Davenport	20	2008	Liberty
	Quinn Backus	20	2014	Colgate
4	Brett Johnson	17	2014	Liberty
5	Desmond Steward	16	2009	Towson
	Quinn Backus	16	2012	Charleston Southern

=== Sacks ===
Career
Rk	Player	Sacks	Years
1	Tarron Jackson	25.0	2017 2018 2019 2020
2	Phillip Oboh	17.0	2006 2007 2008
	Jeffrey Gunter	17.0	2017 2018 2020 2021
4	Adrain Grady	16.5	2003 2004 2005 2006 2007
5	C.J. Brewer	16.0	2017 2018 2019 2020 2021
	Josaiah Stewart	16.0	2021 2022
7	Maurice Simpkins	14.0	2003 2004 2005
	Roderick Holder	14.0	2012 2013 2014
9	Silas Kelly	10.0	2017 2018 2019 2020 2021
10	Quinton Davis	9.5	2009 2010 2011 2012
	Quinn Backus	9.5	2011 2012 2013 2014
	Clev Lubin	9.5	2024

Single season
Rk	Player	Sacks	Year
1	Josaiah Stewart	12.5	2021
2	Tarron Jackson	10.0	2019
3	Clev Lubin	9.5	2024
4	Tarron Jackson	8.5	2020
5	Alex Scearce	8.0	2016
6	Kelvin McIver	7.0	2004
	Michael Mason	7.0	2023
8	Adrain Grady	6.5	2003
	Phillip Oboh	6.5	2009
	Roderick Holder	6.5	2014
	Jeffrey Gunter	6.5	2020
	C.J. Brewer	6.5	2020
	Adrian Hope	6.5	2022

Single game
Rk	Player	Sacks	Year	Opponent
1	Josaiah Stewart	4.0	2021	Georgia Southern
2	Josaiah Stewart	3.5	2021	Kansas
3	Maurice Simpkins	3.0	2003	Charleston Southern
	Tarron Jackson	3.0	2019	Texas State
	Josaiah Stewart	3.0	2021	South Alabama
	Clev Lubin	3.0	2024	App State
7	Ro-Derick Middleton	2.5	2007	Chowan
	Brooks Barbaree	2.5	2008	North Carolina A&T
	Tarron Jackson	2.5	2020	South Alabama
	Tarron Jackson	2.5	2020	Texas State

== Kicking ==
=== Field goals made ===
Career
Rk	Player	FGs	Years
1	Massimo Biscardi	46	2018 2019 2020 2021
2	Justin Durham	42	2007 2008 2009 2010
3	Josh Hoke	40	2003 2004 2005 2006
4	Ryan Granger	38	2013 2014 2015 2016
5	Alex Catron	34	2011 2012 2013 2014
	Kade Hensley	34	2022 2023 2024
7	Kian Afrookhteh	15	2025
8	Evan Rabon	12	2015 2016 2017
9	Grant Clayton	10	2011 2012

Single season
Rk	Player	FGs	Year
1	Ryan Granger	17	2016
2	Ryan Granger	16	2015
	Kade Hensley	16	2024
4	Alex Catron	15	2014
	Massimo Biscardi	15	2019
	Kian Afrookhteh	15	2025
7	Josh Hoke	14	2005
8	Justin Durham	13	2009
	Massimo Biscardi	13	2018
10	Justin Durham	12	2007

Single game
Rk	Player	FGs	Year	Opponent
1	Josh Hoke	4	2006	Elon
	Kade Hensley	4	2024	William & Mary
3	Josh Hoke	3	2004	North Greenville
	Josh Hoke	3	2005	Delaware State
	Justin Durham	3	2007	Winston-Salem State
	Alex Catron	3	2012	Furman
	Alex Catron	3	2014	Gardner-Webb
	Ryan Granger	3	2015	Presbyterian
	Ryan Granger	3	2015	Monmouth
	Ryan Granger	3	2016	Lamar
	Massimo Biscardi	3	2020	South Alabama
	Liam Gray	3	2023	Jacksonville State
	Kian Afrookhteh	3	2025	UL Monroe
	Kian Afrookhteh	3	2025	Marshall
	Kian Afrookhteh	3	2025	Georgia State

=== Field goal percentage ===
Career
Rk	Player	FG%	Years
1	Ryan Granger	80.9%	2013 2014 2015 2016
2	Massimo Biscardi	80.7%	2018 2019 2020 2021
3	Kade Hensley	79.1%	2022 2023 2024
4	Kian Afrookhteh	78.9%	2025
5	Alex Catron	68.0%	2011 2012 2013 2014
6	Justin Durham	63.6%	2007 2008 2009 2010
7	Josh Hoke	63.5%	2003 2004 2005 2006
8	Evan Rabon	63.2%	2015 2016 2017
9	Grant Clayton	55.6%	2011 2012

Single season
Rk	Player	FG%	Year
1	Massimo Biscardi	84.6%	2020
2	Kade Hensley	84.2%	2024
3	Massimo Biscardi	81.3%	2018
4	Ryan Granger	81.0%	2016
5	Ryan Granger	80.0%	2015
6	Kian Afrookhteh	78.9%	2025
7	Alex Catron	76.9%	2013
	Kade Hensley	76.9%	2023
9	Alex Catron	75.0%	2012
	Massimo Biscardi	75.0%	2019
