= List of Coastal Carolina University alumni =

This is a list of notable people associated with Coastal Carolina University in Conway, South Carolina, United States.

== Notable alumni ==
=== Athletics ===
- Sam Antonacci, outfielder for the Chicago White Sox, played for Team Italy in the 2026 World Baseball Classic
- Andrew Beckwith, Most Outstanding Player of the 2016 College World Series, won by the Chanticleers
- Mickey Brantley, former Seattle Mariners and Yomiuri Giants outfielder
- Amber Campbell, hammer thrower at 2005 and 2009 World Championships, and the 2008, 2012 and 2016 Summer Olympics
- Kheli Dube, former MLS forward, New England Revolution
- Tony Dunkin, the only NCAA Division I men's basketball player to be honored as his conference player of the year all four years
- Tom Gillis, PGA Tour professional
- Gary Gilmore, CCU head baseball coach, 2016 National Coach of the Year, also played collegiate baseball at CCU
- Keith Glauber, former Cincinnati Reds pitcher
- Brad Goldberg, MLB pitcher
- Jeffrey Gunter, NFL defensive end, Cincinnati Bengals
- Matt Hazel, NFL wide receiver for the Washington Redskins
- De'Angelo Henderson, NFL running back for the Denver Broncos
- Melissa Jefferson, track and field sprinter, gold medalist at 2022 World Athletics Championships
- Dustin Johnson, professional golfer, 23-time PGA Tour winner
- Tommy La Stella, San Francisco Giants infielder
- Isaiah Likely, NFL tight end, Baltimore Ravens
- Luis Lopez, former Toronto Blue Jays and Montreal Expos infielder
- Kirt Manwaring, former MLB catcher for the San Francisco Giants, Colorado Rockies and Houston Astros
- Jacob May, MLB outfielder for the Chicago White Sox
- Grayson McCall, former Chanticleers quarterback; Sun Belt Conference Player of the Year in 2020 and 2021
- Joseph Ngwenya, former MLS forward, drafted 3rd overall in the 2004 MLS SuperDraft
- Josh Norman, Pro-Bowl NFL cornerback, Carolina Panthers, Washington Redskins, Buffalo Bills, and San Francisco 49ers
- Pedro Ribeiro, midfielder, Orlando City SC
- Stu Riddle, head coach of the University at Buffalo (SUNY) soccer team; 1996 Olympian for New Zealand
- Maurice Simpkins, former NFL linebacker
- Jerome Simpson, former NFL wide receiver for the Minnesota Vikings and Cincinnati Bengals
- Sebastian Söderberg, PGA European Tour, winner of the 2019 Omega European Masters
- Lorenzo Taliaferro, former NFL running back, Baltimore Ravens
- Quinton Teal, defensive back, San Diego Chargers
- Tyler Thigpen, former NFL quarterback
- Mike Tolbert, All Pro NFL fullback, Buffalo Bills

=== Arts, entertainment, and media ===
- Madelyn Cline, actress known for her role as Sarah Cameron on Outer Banks
- Bailey Hanks, actress and winner of MTV's Legally Blonde - The Musical: The Search for Elle Woods
- Kevin Kane, actor
- Michael Kelly, Emmy-nominated television and film actor, best known for House of Cards
- Edwin McCain, singer-songwriter and musician
- Chad Mureta, entrepreneur, author, and mobile app developer
- Diamond Dallas Page, former WWE and WCW professional wrestler, 2017 WWE Hall of Fame inductee
- Elise Testone, contestant on American Idol Season 11
- Brooke Weisbrod, ESPN broadcaster
- Andreas John Ziegler, professional wrestler

=== Other ===
- Megan Ambuhl, former United States Army Reserve soldier notable for her role in the Abu Ghraib torture and prisoner abuse
