= List of Coastal Carolina Chanticleers in the NFL draft =

This is a list of Coastal Carolina Chanticleers football players in the NFL draft.

== Key ==
| B | Back | K | Kicker | NT | Nose tackle |
| C | Center | LB | Linebacker | FB | Fullback |
| DB | Defensive back | P | Punter | HB | Halfback |
| DE | Defensive end | QB | Quarterback | WR | Wide receiver |
| DT | Defensive tackle | RB | Running back | G | Guard |
| E | End | T | Offensive tackle | TE | Tight end |

== Selections ==
| Year | Round | Pick | Overall | Player | Team | Position |
|---|---|---|---|---|---|---|
| 2007 | 7 | 7 | 217 | Tyler Thigpen | Minnesota Vikings | QB |
| 2008 | 2 | 15 | 46 | Jerome Simpson | Cincinnati Bengals | WR |
| 2012 | 5 | 8 | 143 | Josh Norman | Carolina Panthers | DB |
| 2014 | 4 | 38 | 138 | Lorenzo Taliaferro | Baltimore Ravens | RB |
| 2014 | 6 | 14 | 190 | Matt Hazel | Miami Dolphins | WR |
| 2017 | 6 | 19 | 203 | De'Angelo Henderson | Denver Broncos | RB |
| 2021 | 6 | 7 | 191 | Tarron Jackson | Philadelphia Eagles | DE |
| 2022 | 4 | 34 | 191 | Isaiah Likely | Baltimore Ravens | TE |
| 2022 | 7 | 31 | 252 | Jeffrey Gunter | Cincinnati Bengals | DE |
