= Jaivon Heiligh =

American football player (born 1999)

Profile
- Position: Wide receiver

Personal information
- Born: September 2, 1999 (age 27); Venice, Florida, U.S.
- Listed height: 6 ft 2 in (1.88 m)
- Listed weight: 200 lb (91 kg)

Career information
- High school: Venice (Venice, Florida)
- College: Coastal Carolina (2018–2021)
- NFL draft: 2022: undrafted

Career history
- Cincinnati Bengals (2022)*; Winnipeg Blue Bombers (2022)
- * Offseason or practice squad member only

Awards and highlights
- 2× First-team All-Sun Belt (2020, 2021)
- Stats at Pro Football Reference

Jaivon Heiligh (born September 2, 1999) is an American professional football wide receiver. He played college football at Coastal Carolina. Heiligh signed with the Cincinnati Bengals as an undrafted free agent in 2022 but was released prior to the season.

== Early life ==
Heiligh attended Venice High School in Venice, Florida. He would set Florida state high school records in his senior year. He broke the records for career receiving yards and the single season records for catches, yards, and touchdowns. His final stats for the year were 32 touchdowns, 2,359 yards and 131 receptions. Heiligh and fellow Coastal Carolina quarterback Bryce Carpenter led Venice to a state championship. Heiligh was a three-star recruit and he committed to Coastal Carolina University.

== College career ==
In four years at Coastal Carolina, Heiligh played in 45 games totaling 191 catches, 2,825 yards, and 22 touchdowns. He was named to the First-team All-Sun Belt twice in 2020 and 2021 during his junior and senior seasons. In 2020, Heiligh set a Cure Bowl record tallying 13 catches in the 2020 edition of the bowl. He helped lead Coastal Carolina to their first ever bowl victory in the 2021 Cure Bowl in a 47–41 win. In the game, Heiligh became the Coastal Carolina leader in receiving yards in a season. Heiligh entered the 2022 NFL draft at the end of his collegiate career.

== Professional career ==
Pre-draft measurables
Height	Weight	Arm length	Hand span	40-yard dash	20-yard shuttle	Three-cone drill	Vertical jump	Broad jump
6 ft 0 1/4 in (1.84 m)	200 lb (91 kg)	32 1/4 in (0.82 m)	9 1/4 in (0.23 m)	4.63 s	4.46 s	7.19 s	36 in (0.91 m)	9 ft 9 in (2.97 m)
All values from Pro Day

=== Cincinnati Bengals ===
Heiligh signed with the Cincinnati Bengals as an undrafted free agent on May 13, 2022. He was waived on August 22.

=== Winnipeg Blue Bombers ===
Heiligh signed with the Winnipeg Blue Bombers of the CFL on August 30, 2022. On May 14, 2023, Heiligh was released by the Blue Bombers.
