= Cure Bowl =

Annual American college football game

- StaffDNA Cure Bowl
- Stadium: Acrisure Bounce House
- Location: Orlando, Florida (Note: The Acrisure Bounce House has an Orlando mailing address but is located in unincorporated Orange County.)
- Previous stadiums: Camping World Stadium (2014–2018, 2020, 2024, 2025); Exploria Stadium (2019, 2021–2022)
- Operated: 2014–present
- Conference tie-ins: American, CUSA, MAC, Sun Belt
- Payout: US$573,125 (2023)
- Website: curebowl.com

Sponsors
- AutoNation (2014–2018); FBC Mortgage (2019–2020); Tailgreeter (2021); Duluth Trading Company (2022); Avocados from Mexico (2023); StaffDNA (2024–present)

Former names
- AutoNation Cure Bowl (2014–2018); FBC Mortgage Cure Bowl (2019–2020); Tailgreeter Cure Bowl (2021); Duluth Trading Cure Bowl (2022); Avocados from Mexico Cure Bowl (2023)

2025 matchup
- Old Dominion vs. South Florida (Old Dominion 24–10)

The Cure Bowl is an annual American college football bowl game that has been played in December of each year since 2015 in Orlando, Florida. It is currently held at the Acrisure Bounce House, and in the past has been held at Camping World Stadium and Exploria Stadium. The Cure Bowl is so named to promote awareness and research of breast cancer, with proceeds going to the Breast Cancer Research Foundation. The Cure Bowl usually features teams from the American Conference (Note: Known before the 2025 season as the American Athletic Conference.) and the Sun Belt Conference. Since 2024, it has been sponsored by the health care employment website StaffDNA and officially known as the StaffDNA Cure Bowl; previous sponsors include AutoNation (2014–2018), FBC Mortgage (2019–2020), Tailgreeter (2021), Duluth Trading Company (2022), and Avocados from Mexico (2023).

== History ==
The game has tie-ins with the American Conference (American) and the Sun Belt Conference. The inaugural game took place on December 19, 2015, featuring the San Jose State Spartans from the Mountain West Conference and the Georgia State Panthers of the Sun Belt Conference. A Mountain West team was invited to the bowl due to the American not having enough bowl-eligible teams to fill the tie-in.

During the planning stages, it was originally proposed to hold the game at Bright House Networks Stadium (now known as Acrisure Bounce House) on the campus of UCF. However, it was later decided to hold the game at the newly renovated Camping World Stadium in downtown Orlando, joining the Camping World Bowl and the Citrus Bowl as annual bowl games at the venue. The game was at held Camping World Stadium in 2015–2018 and 2020, and at Exploria Stadium, now known as Inter.co Stadium, in 2019, 2021–2022. It moved to FBC Mortgage Stadium at UCF in 2023. It moved back to Camping World Stadium in 2024.

The game was acquired by ESPN Events in May 2020. The 2020 edition of the bowl, between Liberty and Coastal Carolina, became the first Cure Bowl to host ranked teams and to go into overtime.

=== Sponsorship ===
From its inaugural playing in 2015 through 2018, the game was sponsored by AutoNation and was known as the AutoNation Cure Bowl. In December 2019, FBC Mortgage became the new title sponsor, making the game the FBC Mortgage Cure Bowl. In December 2020, FBC Mortgage renewed its sponsorship of the bowl. On December 2, 2021, digital marketplace Tailgreeter became the new sponsor of the bowl, making the game the Tailgreeter Cure Bowl. On June 29, 2022, Duluth Trading Company was announced as the new title sponsor for the Duluth Trading Cure Bowl. On October 31, 2023, Avocados From Mexico, a wholly owned subsidiary of the Mexican Hass Avocado Importers Association, became the new title sponsor of the game. On May 28, 2024, StaffDNA became the new title sponsor of the game.

== Game results ==
All rankings are taken from the AP Poll prior to the game being played.

Date	Winning Team		Losing Team		Venue	Attendance
December 19, 2015	San Jose State	27	Georgia State	16	Camping World Stadium	18,536
December 17, 2016	Arkansas State	31	UCF	13	Camping World Stadium	27,213
December 16, 2017	Georgia State	27	Western Kentucky	17	Camping World Stadium	19,585
December 15, 2018	Tulane	41	Louisiana	24	Camping World Stadium	19,066
December 21, 2019	Liberty	23	Georgia Southern	16	Exploria Stadium	18,158
December 26, 2020	23 Liberty	37	9 Coastal Carolina	34^{OT}	Camping World Stadium	4,488
December 17, 2021	Coastal Carolina	47	Northern Illinois	41	Exploria Stadium	9,784
December 16, 2022	23 Troy	18	22 UTSA	12	Exploria Stadium	11,911
December 16, 2023	Appalachian State	13	Miami (OH)	9	FBC Mortgage Stadium	11,121
December 20, 2024	Ohio	30	Jacksonville State	27	Camping World Stadium	10,518
December 17, 2025	Old Dominion	24	South Florida	10	Camping World Stadium	15,036

== MVPs ==
Year	MVP	Team	Position
2015	Kenny Potter	San Jose State	QB
2016	Kendall Sanders	Arkansas State	WR
2017	Conner Manning	Georgia State	QB
2018	Darius Bradwell	Tulane	RB
2019	Jessie Lemonier	Liberty	DE
2020	Malik Willis	Liberty	QB
2021	Grayson McCall	Coastal Carolina	QB
2022	KJ Robertson	Troy	LB
2023	Anderson Castle	Appalachian State	RB
2024	Parker Navarro	Ohio	QB
2025	Quinn Henicle	Old Dominion	QB

== Most appearances ==
Updated through the December 2025 edition (11 games, 22 total appearances).

Teams with multiple appearances

Team	Appearances	Record	Win pct.
Liberty	2	2–0	1.000
Georgia State	2	1–1	0.500
Coastal Carolina	2	1–1	0.500

Teams with a single appearance

Won (7): Appalachian State, Arkansas State, Ohio, Old Dominion, San Jose State, Troy, Tulane
Lost (9): Georgia Southern, Jacksonville State, Louisiana, Miami (OH), Northern Illinois, South Florida, UCF, UTSA, Western Kentucky

== Appearances by conference ==
Updated through the December 2025 edition (11 games, 22 total appearances).

Conference	Record				Appearances by season	
Conference	Games	W	L	Win pct.	Won	Lost
Sun Belt	10	6	4	.600	2016, 2017, 2021, 2022, 2023, 2025	2015, 2018, 2019, 2020
American	3	1	2	.333	2018	2016, 2025
MAC	3	1	2	.333	2024	2021, 2023
CUSA	3	0	3	.000		2017, 2022, 2024
Independents	2	2	0	1.000	2019, 2020	
Mountain West	1	1	0	1.000	2015	

Independent appearances: Liberty (2019, 2020)

== Game records ==
Team	Performance vs. Opponent	Year
Most points scored	47, Coastal Carolina vs. Northern Illinois	2021
Fewest points allowed	9, Miami (OH) vs. Appalachian State	2023
Margin of victory	18, Arkansas State vs. UCF	2016
First downs	29, shared by: Northern Illinois vs. Coastal Carolina; Ohio vs. Jacksonville State	2021; 2024
Total yards	516, Northern Illinois vs. Coastal Carolina	2021
Rushing yards	337, Tulane vs. Louisiana	2018
Passing yards	362, Jacksonville State vs. Ohio	2024
Most points scored (losing team)	41, Northern Illinois vs. Coastal Carolina	2021
Most points scored (both teams)	88, Coastal Carolina vs. Northern Illinois	2021
Fewest yards allowed	223, UCF vs. Arkansas State	2016
Fewest rushing yards allowed	-2, Western Kentucky vs. Georgia State	2017
Fewest passing yards allowed	44, Miami (OH) vs. Appalachian State	2023
Individual	Player, Team	Year
All-Purpose Yards	234, Quinn Henicle (Old Dominion)	2025
Points scored	24, shared by: Malik Willis (Liberty); Grayson McCall (Coastal Carolina); Parker Navarro (Ohio)	2020; 2021; 2024
Passing touchdowns	4, Grayson McCall (Coastal Carolina)	2021
Rushing yards	180, Rashad Amos (Miami (OH))	2023
Passing yards	362, Tyler Huff (Jacksonville State)	2024
Receiving yards	184, Cam Vaughn (Jacksonville State)	2024
Receptions	13, Jaivon Heiligh (Coastal Carolina)	2020
Rushing touchdowns	4, Malik Willis (Liberty)	2020
Receiving touchdowns	3, Kendall Sanders (Arkansas State)	2016
Tackles	14, shared by: Demeitre Brim (UCF); Silas Kelly (Coastal Carolina); Carlton Martial (Troy)	2016; 2021; 2022
Sacks	2.5, Curley Young Jr. (Jacksonville State)	2024
Interceptions	2, Jerome Carter (Old Dominion)	2025
Long Plays	Record, Player, Team vs. Opponent	Year
Touchdown run	60 yds., Braydon Bennett (Coastal Carolina)	2021
Touchdown pass	75 yds., shared by: Justice Hansen to Kendall Sanders (Arkansas State); Tyler Huff to Cam Vaughn (Jacksonville State)	2016; 2024
Kickoff return	41 yds., Trayvon Rudolph (Northern Illinois)	2018
Punt return	85 yds., Tyler Ervin (San Jose State)	2015
Interception return	63 yds., Bralen Trahan (Louisiana)	2018
Fumble return	8 yds., Dre Pinckney (Coastal Carolina)	2021
Punt	70 yds., Wil Lutz (Georgia State)	2015
Field goal	46 yds., Alex Probert (Liberty)	2019

== Media coverage ==
The game was initially televised by CBS Sports Network, making it one of the few bowl games to not be televised by an ESPN network. Following the bowl's acquisition by ESPN Events in 2020, broadcasting moved to ESPN.

== See also ==
- Greater Orlando
