= Alex Spillum =

American football player (born 1999)

No. 30 – Berlin Thunder (ELF)
- Position: Safety
- Roster status: Active

Personal information
- Born: 20 March 1999 (age 27); Chanhassen, Minnesota, U.S.
- Listed height: 6 ft 2 in (1.88 m)
- Listed weight: 188 lb (85 kg)

Career information
- High school: Chanhassen (Chanhassen, Minnesota)
- College: Coastal Carolina (2017–2021)
- NFL draft: 2022: undrafted

Career history
- Green Bay Packers (2022)*; Tampa Bay Buccaneers (2022)*; Schwäbisch Hall Unicorns (2022); Berlin Thunder (2023–present)
- * Offseason or practice squad member only

Awards and highlights
- Chanhassen Alumni Dunk Contest Champion; German Bowl champion (XLIII); 2× Third-team All-Sun Belt (2020, 2021)

Alex Spillum (born 20 March 1999) is a professional American football player for the Berlin Thunder in the European League of Football. He played college football at Coastal Carolina.

== Early life ==
Spillum attended Chanhassen High School where he played football, baseball and also lettered in track and field. For the football team he played quarterback, wide receiver and safety. After moving from wide receiver to quarterback for his senior year, he led the Storm to an undefeated regular season and the third round of the Class 5A state tournament. Spillum was selected to the Minnesota Football Showcase South Roster for the All-Star Game as a defensive back and was rated as a two-star recruit by 247Sports.com.

Spillum had offers from North Carolina University, South Carolina University and Coastal Carolina University, committing to the Chanticleers on 17 January 2017.

== College career ==
In his time at Coastal Carolina, he was a two-time All-Sun Belt third-team selection and was All-Conference Honoree from Phil Steele in both 2020 and 2021. In the 2021 Cure Bowl win, he made a remarkable play, tackling his own teammate after a recovered forced fumble to keep ball possession. In his four years, Spillum played in 46 games. He totaled 184 tackles, including 101 solo stops and 83 assisted tackles, to go along with 5.5 tackles-for-loss, 1.0 sacks, seven interceptions, 17 passes defended, one forced fumble, two fumble recoveries, and two blocked kicks.

== Professional career ==
=== 2022 NFL draft ===
Pre-draft measurables
Height	Weight	Arm length	Hand span	40-yard dash	10-yard split	20-yard split	20-yard shuttle	Three-cone drill	Vertical jump	Broad jump	Bench press
6 ft 017 in (2.26 m)	188 lb (85 kg)	31 3/8 in (0.80 m)	9 1/2 in (0.24 m)	4.51 s	1.62 s	2.67 s	4.28 s	6.67 s	36 1/2 in (0.93 m)	10 ft 06 in (3.20 m)	13 reps
Measurements from Pro Day

In the 2022 NFL draft Spillum went undrafted.

After the draft, the Green Bay Packers invited Spillum to their minicamp. He was cut from the Packers roster. Shortly after, he was invited by Tampa Bay Buccaneers for their training camp.

Spillum played with the Schwäbisch Hall Unicorns in the German Football League for the 2022 season. On 16 November 2022 Spillum signed with the Berlin Thunder on a one-year deal.

=== Professional statistics ===
Year	Team	GP	Tackles						Interceptions				
Year	Team	GP	Cmb	Solo	Ast	TFL	Yds	Sck	FF	PD	Int	Yds	TD
European League of Football
2023	Berlin Thunder	0	0	0	0	0	0	0	0	0	0	0	0
ELF total		0	0	0	0	0	0	0	0	0	0	0	0
Source: europeanleague.football
