= Chad Mureta =

American businessman & author (born 1981)

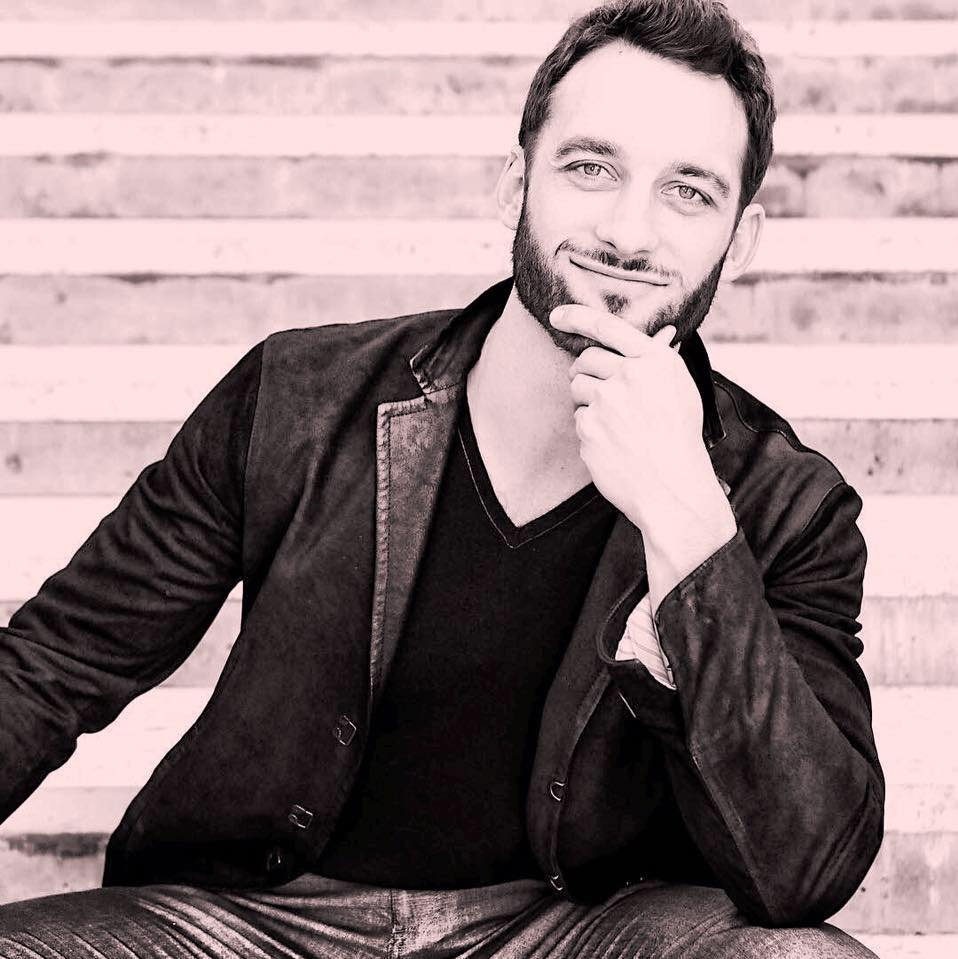
- Chad Mureta
- Born: June 16, 1981 (age 45); Vermont, U.S.
- Occupations: Author of App Empire; CEO of App Empire
- Website: appempire.com

Chad Mureta is an American entrepreneur, author, and mobile app expert. He founded Empire Apps, and co-founded T3 Apps, Best Apps and Project EVO.

== Early life ==
Chad Mureta was born and raised in Vermont, US.

== Career ==
Mureta ventured into entrepreneurship by owning a newspaper company and engaging in real estate investments. In 2006, he established a real estate agency in Myrtle Beach, South Carolina, where he navigated through challenges posed by the housing market crash.

In January 2009, Mureta faced an accident when his truck flipped four times after hitting a deer, resulting in severe damage and nearly severing his left arm. This incident led to two major surgeries and an 18-month recovery period, resulting in nearly $100,000 in hospital bills. While in the hospital, a friend gave Mureta a newspaper article about mobile app millionaires, sparking his interest in mobile app development.

Mureta borrowed $1,800 to launch his first app, "Fingerprint Security-Pro", which simulated fingerprint-scanning technology. The app gained visibility in the App Store, reaching number 27 in 2011 and generating revenue over $500,000.

Subsequently, he developed over 50 apps that have been downloaded more than 150 million times worldwide.

In 2012, Mureta authored "App Empire: Make Money, Have a Life, and Let Technology Work for You", published by John Wiley & Sons. The book chronicles Mureta's journey from a real estate agent to appreneur, providing a non-technical guide to starting a mobile app business.

In July 2012, Mureta was featured on 60 Minutes in an interview titled "The App Revolution," discussing the implications of the app industry's growth.

During a BBC interview in October 2015, Mureta discussed his near-death experience and his company, App Empire, which brings in $3m to $5m in revenue every year.

In February 2018, Project EVO launched an Indiegogo campaign, hitting $1 million in funding by November 18, 2018.

Mureta was interviewed by Tony Robbins in a special titled, "How To Create An App Empire".

=== Philosophy ===
Mureta believes in understanding the marketplace to come up with app ideas and then outsourcing the actual programming. Mureta created the first Emoji app in two weeks. Within six days of release, it was averaging $500 per day and was No. 1 on the App Store's productivity category and No. 12 in the top free overall category.

Mureta runs most of his business from his iPhone/iPad, including managing his employees, looking at his apps' daily stats and rankings, and surveying the app market. He has used the app business as a means to work less and to use more time to travel.

== Personal life ==
Mureta resides in the United States.
