= Mike Tolbert =

American football player (born 1985)

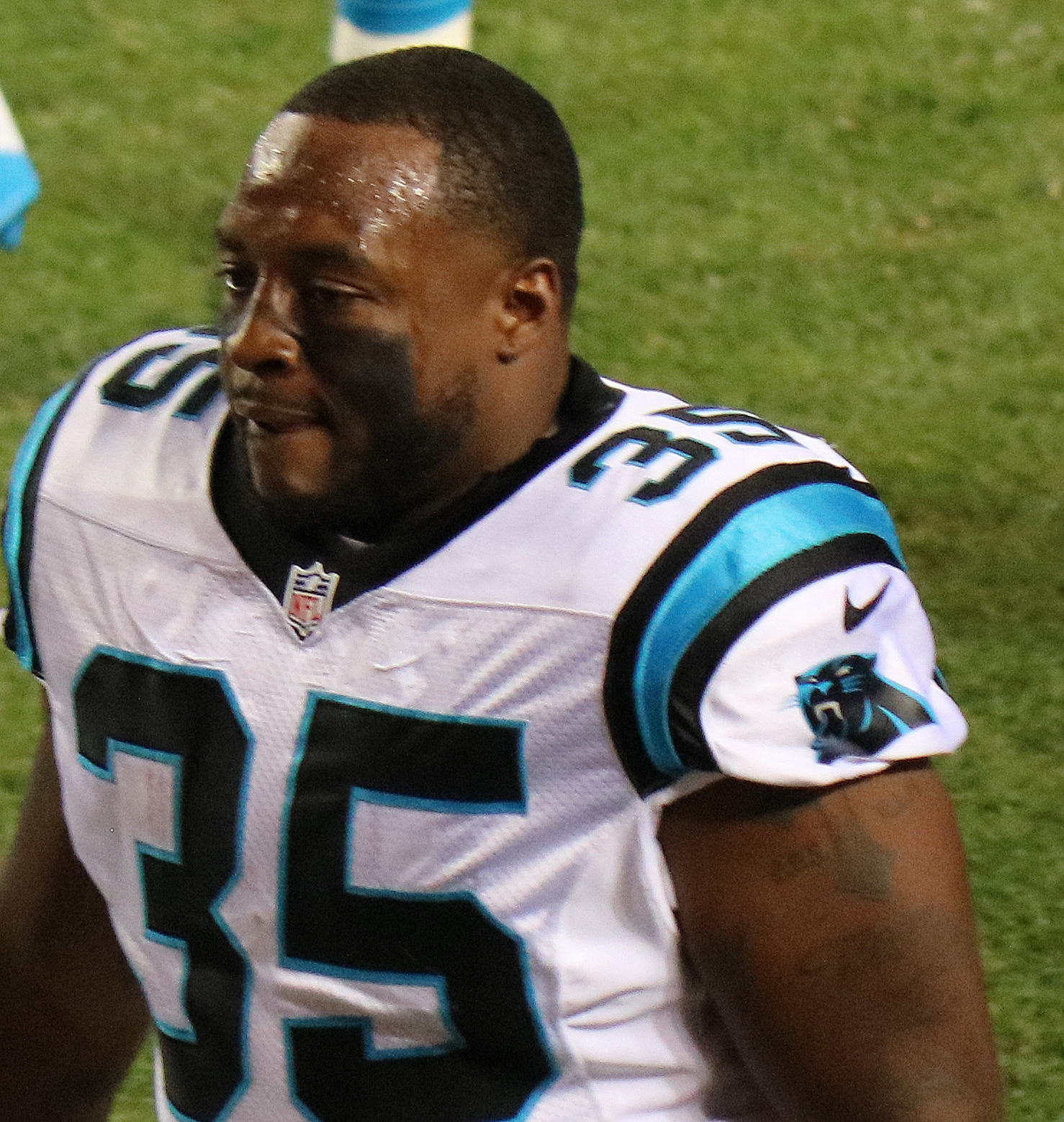
- Tolbert with the Carolina Panthers in 2016

No. 35
- Position: Fullback

Personal information
- Born: November 23, 1985 (age 40); Carrollton, Georgia, U.S.
- Listed height: 5 ft 9 in (1.75 m)
- Listed weight: 260 lb (118 kg)

Career information
- High school: Douglas County (Douglasville, Georgia)
- College: Coastal Carolina (2004–2007)
- NFL draft: 2008: undrafted

Career history
- San Diego Chargers (2008–2011); Carolina Panthers (2012–2016); Buffalo Bills (2017)

Awards and highlights
- 2× First-team All-Pro (2013, 2015); 3× Pro Bowl (2013, 2015, 2016)

Career NFL statistics
- Rushing yards: 2,649
- Rushing average: 3.8
- Rushing touchdowns: 34
- Receptions: 217
- Receiving yards: 1,861
- Receiving touchdowns: 12
- Stats at Pro Football Reference

William Michael Tolbert (born November 23, 1985) is an American former professional football player who was a fullback in the National Football League (NFL). He played college football for the Coastal Carolina Chanticleers. Tolbert was signed by the San Diego Chargers as an undrafted free agent in 2008. He was also a member of the Carolina Panthers, where he was a three-time Pro Bowler and two-time first-team All-Pro. He signed with the Buffalo Bills in 2017 after being released by the Panthers.

== Early life ==
Tolbert attended and played high school football at Douglas County High School. Tolbert power cleaned 600+ pounds in high school with teammate Matthew Land and was tackled regularly in practice by Land. Tolbert then went on to play college and NFL.

== College career ==
Tolbert had a four-year career at Coastal Carolina University under head coach David Bennett. As a freshman, he had 281 rushing yards and a rushing touchdown. As a sophomore, he had 202 rushing yards and four rushing touchdowns. As a junior, he had 439 rushing yards and seven rushing touchdowns. He was named a second-team FCS All-American after leading the Chanticleers in rushing with 748 yards on 111 carries and nine touchdowns. In four years, he had 303 touches without any fumbles. He followed in the footsteps of Quinton Teal, who was undrafted in 2007, but went to San Diego Chargers training camp as an undrafted free agent and made the roster becoming the first player in school history to appear in an NFL game. At Coastal Carolina, Tolbert also was teammates with quarterback Tyler Thigpen and wide receiver Jerome Simpson, who would both also go on to play in the NFL.

== Professional career ==
Pre-draft measurables
Height	Weight
5 ft 8 3/4 in (1.75 m)	246 lb (112 kg)
All values from Pro Day

=== San Diego Chargers ===
Tolbert was signed as an undrafted free agent by the San Diego Chargers on April 28, 2008. On September 22, against the New York Jets, he had his first professional touchdown in the 48–29 victory. Tolbert played in 13 games in the 2008 season (starting 7 at fullback) and rushed for only 37 yards on 13 carries. In the 2009 season, he rushed for 148 yards with one touchdown, as well as catching 17 passes for 192 yards and three receiving touchdowns, of which one was a 66-yarder against the Cleveland Browns. In the 2010 season, he emerged as a co-starter along with Ryan Mathews. In Week 2, against the Jacksonville Jaguars, he had 82 rushing yards and two rushing touchdowns. On October 3, against the Arizona Cardinals, he had 100 rushing yards and a rushing touchdown in the 41–10 victory. On November 22, against the Denver Broncos, he had 111 rushing yards and a rushing touchdown in the 35–14 victory. Overall, he finished the 2010 season with 182 carries for 735 yards and 11 touchdowns. He started the 2011 season with 35 rushing yards, a rushing touchdown, nine receptions, 58 receiving yards, and two receiving touchdowns in the 24–17 victory. Overall, he finished the 2011 season with 490 rushing yards, eight rushing touchdowns, 54 receptions, 433 receiving yards, and two receiving touchdowns.

=== Carolina Panthers ===
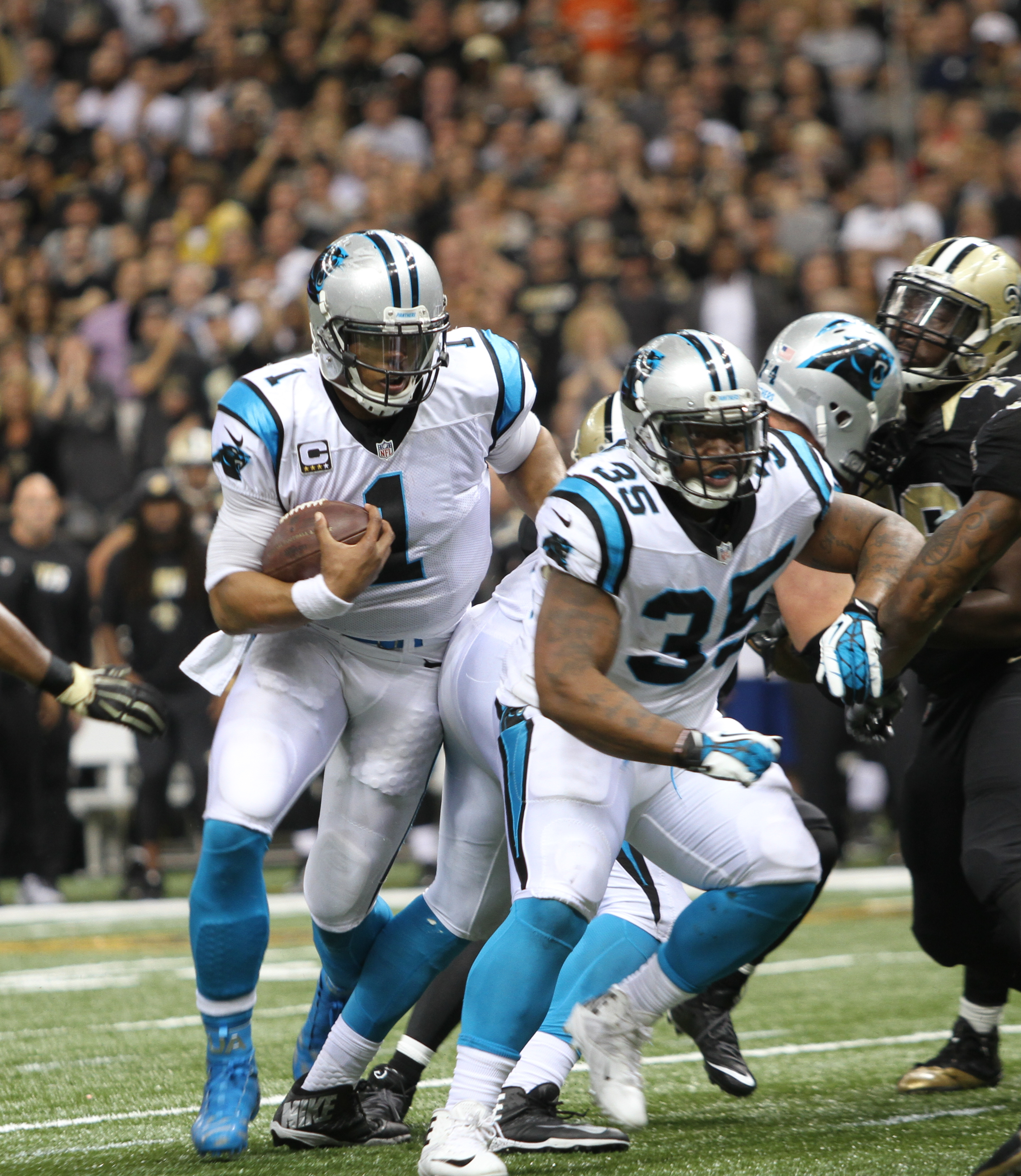
Tolbert blocking for Cam Newton in a game against the New Orleans Saints in 2015.

On March 19, 2012, Tolbert signed a four-year, $10 million ($4.2 million guaranteed) contract with the Carolina Panthers where he got the nickname, The Toldozer. In the regular season finale against the New Orleans Saints, he had three rushing touchdowns in the 44–38 victory. Overall, in the 2012 season, he finished with 183 rushing yards, seven rushing touchdowns, 27 receptions, and 268 receiving yards. Utilized as a fullback, Tolbert earned his first Pro Bowl appearance in 2013. Overall, he finished the season with 361 rushing yards, five rushing touchdowns, 27 receptions, 184 receiving yards, and two receiving touchdowns. He was also named to the 2013 All-Pro Team, another first of his career.

In the 2014 season, Tolbert finished with 37 carries for 78 rushing yards and 12 receptions for 93 receiving yards in eight games in the regular season. The Panthers made the playoffs and faced off against the Arizona Cardinals in the Wild Card Round. He finished the 27–16 victory with seven rushing yards and a one-yard touchdown reception. In the Divisional Round against the Seattle Seahawks, he had ten rushing yards and a 14-yard reception in the 31–17 loss.

Tolbert finished the 2015 regular season with 62 carries for 256 yards and one rushing touchdown to go along with 18 receptions for 154 yards and three touchdowns. For his efforts, he was named to the 2015 Pro Bowl as well as the AP All-Pro First-team. The Panthers finished the season with a 15–1 record, which set a new franchise record for wins. On February 7, 2016, Tolbert was part of the Panthers team that played in Super Bowl 50. In the game, the Panthers fell to the Denver Broncos by a score of 24–10. In the loss, Tolbert had five carries for 18 yards and one fumble.

On March 9, 2016, Tolbert signed a two-year deal with the worth $3.3 million with $700,000 guaranteed to stay with the Panthers. He finished the 2016 season with 114 rushing yards to go along with 10 receptions for 72 yards and a receiving touchdown.

On February 21, 2017, Tolbert was released by the Panthers.

=== Buffalo Bills ===
On March 8, 2017, Tolbert signed with the Buffalo Bills.

Throughout training camp, he competed for the backup running back role against Jonathan Williams. Head coach Sean McDermott named him the backup to LeSean McCoy to start the regular season.

On September 10, in the season opening 21–12 victory over the New York Jets, Tolbert had a one-yard rushing touchdown in the fourth quarter for his first score with the Buffalo Bills. Overall, he finished the 2017 season with 247 rushing yards, one rushing touchdown, 14 receptions, and 78 receiving yards.

== Career statistics ==
=== NFL ===
Year	Team	Games		Rushing					Receiving					Fumbles	
Year	Team	GP	GS	Att	Yds	Avg	Lng	TD	Rec	Yds	Avg	Lng	TD	Fum	Lost
2008	SD	13	7	13	37	2.8	11	0	13	171	13.2	67	1	0	0
2009	SD	16	3	25	148	5.9	32	1	17	192	11.3	66	3	1	0
2010	SD	15	4	182	735	4.0	36	11	25	216	8.6	28	0	5	3
2011	SD	15	1	121	490	4.0	40	8	54	433	8.0	27	2	2	1
2012	CAR	16	4	54	183	3.4	13	7	27	268	9.9	26	0	0	0
2013	CAR	16	13	101	361	3.6	22	5	27	184	6.8	18	2	0	0
2014	CAR	8	2	37	78	2.1	15	0	12	93	7.8	18	0	0	0
2015	CAR	16	3	62	256	4.1	29	1	18	153	8.6	40	3	0	0
2016	CAR	16	2	35	114	3.3	14	0	10	72	7.2	17	1	0	0
2017	BUF	12	0	66	247	3.7	25	1	14	78	5.6	12	0	2	1
Career		143	44	696	2,649	3.8	40	34	217	1,861	8.6	67	12	10	5

=== College ===
Season	Team	Rushing					Receiving				
Season	Team	Att	Yds	Avg	Lng	TD	Rec	Yds	Avg	Lng	TD
2004	Coastal Carolina	47	281	6.0	52	1	2	26	13.0	15	0
2005	Coastal Carolina	49	202	4.1	16	4	3	20	6.7	17	0
2006	Coastal Carolina	70	439	6.3	80	7	14	187	13.4	45	1
2007	Coastal Carolina	111	748	6.7	86	9	7	58	8.3	14	0
Career		277	1,670	5.8	86	21	26	291	10.4	45	1

== In popular culture ==
In the third season of the FXX comedy series The League, the character Andre goes on a rant about Mike Tolbert and what he calls "Touchdown Vultures," or players who enter the game in goal line situations and score touchdowns, "stealing" fantasy points from the player whom they replaced.

Tolbert has worked as a correspondent for the Carolina Panthers since 2018.
