= De'Angelo Henderson =

American football player (born 1992)

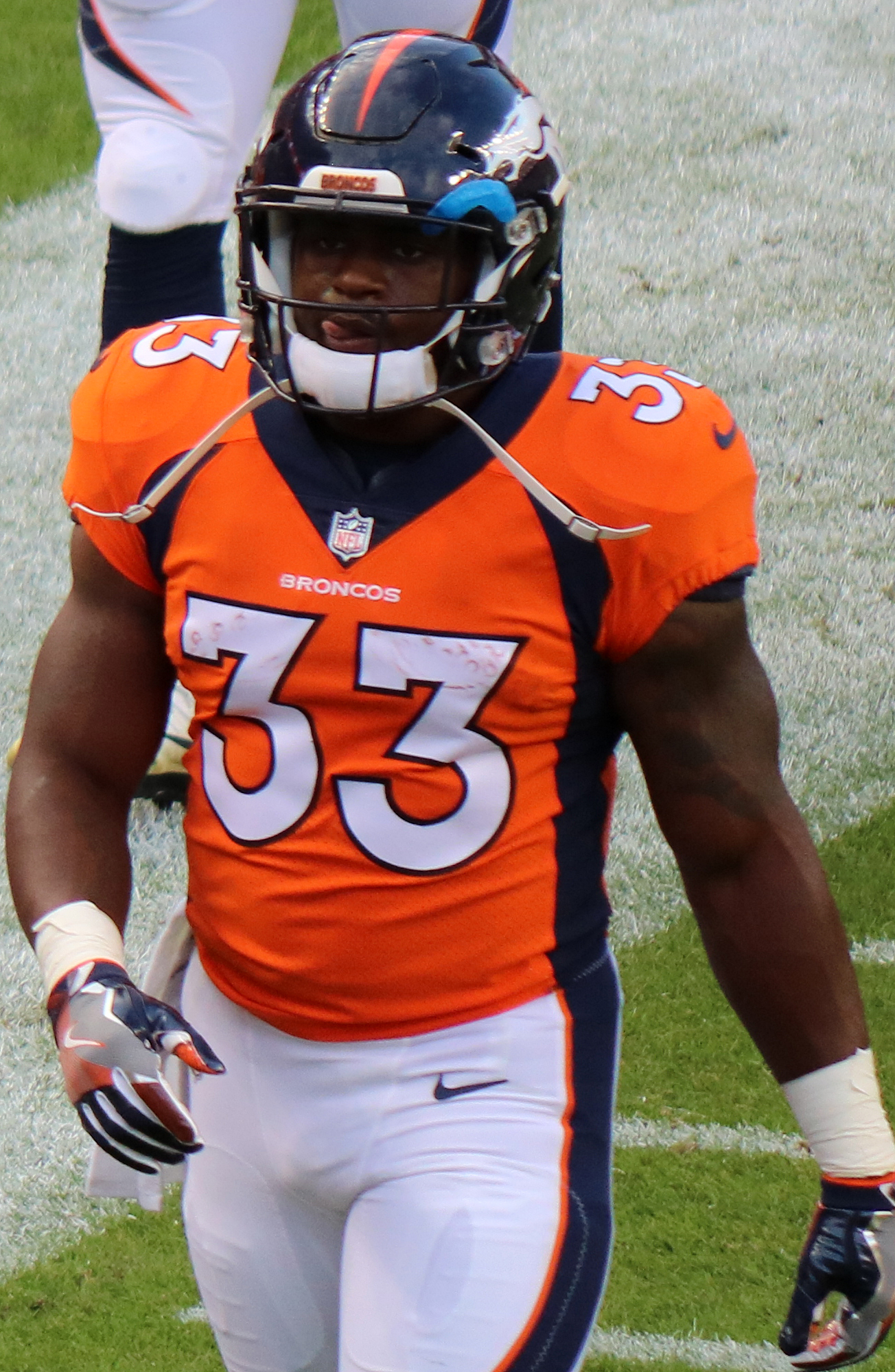
- Henderson with the Denver Broncos in 2017

No. 33, 35, 29
- Position: Running back

Personal information
- Born: November 24, 1992 (age 33); Summerville, South Carolina, U.S.
- Listed height: 5 ft 8 in (1.73 m)
- Listed weight: 208 lb (94 kg)

Career information
- High school: Summerville
- College: Coastal Carolina
- NFL draft: 2017: 6th round, 203rd overall pick

Career history
- Denver Broncos (2017); New York Jets (2018); Minnesota Vikings (2019)*; Philadelphia Eagles (2019)*; Houston Roughnecks (2020)
- * Offseason or practice squad member only

Awards and highlights
- Big South Offensive Player of the Year (2015); 2× First team All-Big South (2014, 2015)

Career NFL statistics
- Rushing yards: 32
- Receptions: 2
- Receiving yards: 36
- Receiving touchdowns: 1
- H/HendDe02.htm Stats at Pro Football Reference

De'Angelo Henderson Sr. (born November 24, 1992) is an American former professional football player who was a running back in the National Football League (NFL). He played college football for the Coastal Carolina Chanticleers and set an NCAA Division I record for touchdowns in consecutive games at 35.

== Early life ==
Henderson attended and played high school football at Summerville High School for the Green Wave.

== College career ==
Henderson attended and played college football at Coastal Carolina University. In the 2013 season, he finished with 82 carries for 599 rushing yards and six rushing touchdowns. In the 2014 season, he finished with 234 carries for 1,534 rushing yards and 20 rushing touchdowns. In the 2015 season, he finished with 222 carries for 1,346 rushing yards and 16 rushing touchdowns. In his final collegiate season in 2016, he had 183 carries for 1,156 rushing yards and 16 rushing touchdowns.

== Professional career ==
Pre-draft measurables
Height	Weight	Arm length	Hand span	40-yard dash	Vertical jump	Broad jump	Bench press
5 ft 8 in (1.73 m)	208 lb (94 kg)	29 in (0.74 m)	9 1/2 in (0.24 m)	4.48 s	34.0 in (0.86 m)	10 ft 0 in (3.05 m)	20 reps
All values from NFL Combine

=== Denver Broncos ===
Henderson was selected by the Denver Broncos in the sixth round, 203rd overall, in the 2017 NFL draft. He became the sixth Coastal Carolina Chanticleer to be drafted and the first since Lorenzo Taliaferro and Matt Hazel in 2014. On September 24, against the Buffalo Bills in Week 3, Henderson recorded the first carry of his NFL career, a one-yard rush. In the regular season finale against the Kansas City Chiefs, he scored his first career professional touchdown, a 29-yard reception from quarterback Paxton Lynch. In five games in the 2017 season, he finished with seven carries for 13 rushing yards to go along with two receptions for 36 receiving yards and a receiving touchdown.

On September 1, 2018, Henderson was waived by the Broncos.

=== New York Jets ===
On September 3, 2018, Henderson was signed to the practice squad of the New York Jets. He was promoted to the active roster on October 27, 2018. He was waived on November 2, 2018, and was re-signed to the practice squad. He was promoted back to the active roster on December 14, 2018. In three games in the 2018 season, he had two carries for 19 yards. Henderson was released by the Jets on July 23, 2019.

=== Minnesota Vikings ===
On July 24, 2019, Henderson was claimed off waivers by the Minnesota Vikings. He was waived on August 31, 2019.

=== Philadelphia Eagles ===
Henderson was signed to the Philadelphia Eagles' practice squad on October 14, 2019. His practice squad contract with the team expired on January 13, 2020.

=== Houston Roughnecks ===
Henderson signed with the Houston Roughnecks of the XFL on January 8, 2020. He had his contract terminated when the league suspended operations on April 10, 2020.
