= Quinton Teal =

American football player (born 1984)

No. 28, 26, 36
- Position: Safety

Personal information
- Born: March 8, 1984 (age 42); Bennettsville, South Carolina, U.S.
- Listed height: 6 ft 1 in (1.85 m)
- Listed weight: 198 lb (90 kg)

Career information
- College: Coastal Carolina
- NFL draft: 2007: undrafted

Career history
- Carolina Panthers (2007–2009); Seattle Seahawks (2010)*; San Diego Chargers (2010)
- * Offseason or practice squad member only

Career NFL statistics
- Total tackles: 57
- Fumble recoveries: 1
- Stats at Pro Football Reference

Quinton Teal (born March 8, 1984) is an American former professional football player who was a safety in the National Football League (NFL), primarily for the Carolina Panthers. He played college football for the Coastal Carolina Chanticleers.

== Early life and education ==
He was born in Bennettsville, South Carolina where he attended Marlboro County High School. He played college football at Coastal Carolina University. A three-time first team All-Big South winner, he holds the Big South Conference record with 17 career interceptions.

At Coastal Carolina, Teal played with future NFL players QB Tyler Thigpen, Miami Dolphins, WR Jerome Simpson, Cincinnati Bengals, FB Mike Tolbert, Carolina Panthers.

== Professional career ==
In the 2007 season he ranked third on the Panthers with 13 special teams tackles. He made his first NFL start against the Dallas Cowboys on December 22 and responded with a career-high seven tackles. He was the only undrafted rookie free agent to make Carolina's 53-man roster. Had 45 tackles in his 3-year career with the Panthers (2007–2009).

On April 29, 2010, Teal signed with the Seattle Seahawks but was later cut from the team.

On August 10, 2010, Teal signed a two-year contract with the San Diego Chargers but was released during final cuts on September 4, 2010. He was then re-signed by the team on September 28, 2010.

== Personal life ==
Quinton currently owns and operates Teal Fitness with his spouse in the Charlotte, NC area.

Quinton Teal and Mike Tolbert are the first Coastal Carolina teammates to be on the same NFL roster.
