= 2021 Cure Bowl =

Postseason college football bowl game

2021 Tailgreeter Cure Bowl
- 7th Cure Bowl
Northern Illinois Huskies	Coastal Carolina Chanticleers
(9–4)	(10–2)
MAC	Sun Belt
41	47
Head coach: Thomas Hammock	Head coach: Jamey Chadwell
	1	2	3	4	Total
Northern Illinois	10	14	14	3	41
Coastal Carolina	6	13	14	14	47
- Date: December 17, 2021
- Season: 2021
- Stadium: Exploria Stadium
- Location: Orlando, Florida
- MVP: Grayson McCall (QB, Coastal Carolina)
- Favorite: Coastal Carolina by 9.5
- Referee: Scott Hardin (C-USA)
- Attendance: 9,784

United States TV coverage
- Network: ESPN2
- Announcers: Mike Morgan (play-by-play), Kirk Morrison (analyst) and Dawn Davenport (sideline)

International TV coverage
- Network: ESPN Brazil
- Announcers: Renan do Couto (play-by-play) and Weinny Eirado (analyst)

The 2021 Cure Bowl was a college football bowl game played on December 17, 2021, at Exploria Stadium in Orlando, Florida. The seventh edition of the Cure Bowl, the game featured the Northern Illinois Huskies of the Mid-American Conference and the Coastal Carolina Chanticleers of the Sun Belt Conference. The game began at 6:00 p.m. EST and aired on ESPN2. It was one of the 2021–22 bowl games concluding the 2021 FBS football season. Sponsored by digital marketplace Tailgreeter, the game was officially known as the Tailgreeter Cure Bowl.

Northern Illinois entered the game with a 9–4 record while Coastal Carolina entered with a 10–2 record. Northern Illinois came into the game following a win in the 2021 MAC Championship Game. Coastal Carolina would enter the game with a two-game winning streak. Coastal Carolina was favored to win the game, as they entered the game favored to win by 9.5 points. The game was expected to be a close game between Northern Illinois's and Coastal Carolina's rushing offenses, both of which finished top ten in the FBS.

On the first drive of the game, Northern Illinois would score a touchdown. This would be the first of eight straight drives that resulted in scores. The first possession of the game not to result in a score was the last drive of the first half, where half time prematurely ended the possession. Northern Illinois would lead at half time by seven points. The second half started by four straight touchdown drives. With 0:54 to go in the third quarter, Coastal Carolina punted for the first time in the game by either team. Northern Illinois would respond with a field goal that would be their last score of the game. Coastal Carolina would score two more touchdowns and force a turnover on downs and fumble. On the last possession of the game, Northern Illinois would advance to Coastal Carolina's five yard line before time ran out. Coastal Carolina defeated Northern Illinois 47–41, to claim their first bowl win in program history.

== Teams ==
Consistent with conference tie-ins, the game featured the Northern Illinois Huskies from the Mid-American Conference and the Coastal Carolina Chanticleers from the Sun Belt Conference; the bowl has an additional tie-in with the American Athletic Conference that was not used. This was the first meeting ever between the two teams. This was Northern Illinois' first appearance in the Cure Bowl and its 14th bowl appearance overall, while Coastal Carolina made its second Cure Bowl appearance, having lost the 2020 edition, which was also its only other bowl appearance in program history.

=== Northern Illinois Huskies ===
After compiling a record of 0–6 in the pandemic-shortened 2020 season, the Northern Illinois Huskies achieved a dramatic turnaround in 2021, finishing the season as the champions of the Mid-American Conference. The Huskies began their season with an upset victory against Georgia Tech, winning off of a two-point conversion with less than a minute remaining in the game. NIU was not able to keep up the momentum; they fell in their next two games, against Wyoming and No. 25 Michigan. From there, Northern Illinois began a streak of five consecutive wins that saw them achieve bowl eligibility by the end of October. The Huskies defeated Maine and Eastern Michigan, the latter on homecoming, before hitting the road to beat Toledo. They returned home, defeating Bowling Green, before beating Central Michigan to secure their place in a bowl. NIU suffered their third loss to begin the month of November; they fell on the road against Kent State, but rebounded with wins against Ball State and Buffalo. They concluded their regular season with a loss to Western Michigan, but they had already secured their place in the 2021 MAC Championship Game, where they defeated Kent State in a rematch the following week to win the MAC Championship. Northern Illinois accepted its Cure Bowl bid the following day, on December 5, 2021; it entered with a record of 9–4 and a 6–2 record in conference play.

== Game summary ==
2021 Tailgreeter Cure Bowl

Quarter	1	2	3	4	Total
Northern Illinois	10	14	14	3	41
Coastal Carolina	6	13	14	14	47

at Exploria Stadium • Orlando, Florida

- Date: Friday, December 17, 2021
- Game time: 6:00 p.m. EST
- Game weather: • Temperature: 74 °F (23 °C) • Wind: E 8mph
- Game attendance: 9,784
- Referee: Scott Hardin
- TV announcers (ESPN2): Mike Morgan (play-by-play), Kirk Morrison (analyst) and Dawn Davenport (sideline)
- Box score

Game information

First quarter

- (9:51) NIU – Cole Tucker 5 yard pass from Rocky Lombardi, John Richardson kick (Drive: 11 plays, 75 yards, 5:09; Northern Illinois 7–0)
- (5:13) CCU – Braydon Bennett 13 yard run, Massimo Biscardi kick blocked (Drive: 10 plays, 75 yards, 4:38; Northern Illinois 7–6)
- (1:43) NIU – John Richardson 41 yard field goal (Drive: 8 plays, 34 yards, 3:30; Northern Illinois 10–6)

Second quarter

- (13:46) CCU – Aaron Bedgood 40 yard pass from Grayson McCall, Massimo Biscardi kick (Drive: 9 plays, 79 yards, 2:57; Coastal Carolina 13–10)
- (8:35) NIU – Clin Ratkovich 2 yard run, John Richardson kick (Drive: 9 plays, 68 yards, 5:11; Northern Illinois 17–13)
- (5:48) CCU – Massimo Biscardi 27 yard field goal (Drive: 8 plays, 58 yards, 2:47; Northern Illinois 17–16)
- (1:12) NIU – Miles Joiner 12 yard pass from Rocky Lombardi, John Richardson kick (Drive: 10 plays, 67 yards, 4:36; Northern Illinois 24–16)
- (00:05) CCU – Massimo Biscardi 43 yard field goal (Drive: 10 plays, 44 yards, 1:07; Northern Illinois 24–19)

Third quarter

- (12:34) CCU – Isaiah Likely 27 yard pass from Grayson McCall, Massimo Biscardi kick (Drive: 5 plays, 75 yards, 2:26; Coastal Carolina 26–24)
- (10:08) NIU – Rocky Lombardi 1 yard run, John Richardson kick (Drive: 5 plays, 79 yards, 2:26; Northern Illinois 31–26)
- (9:27) CCU – Braydon Bennett 60 yard run, Massimo Biscardi kick (Drive: 2 plays, 75 yards, 0:41; Coastal Carolina 33–31)
- (3:13) NIU – Antario Brown 7 yard run, John Richardson kick (Drive: 10 plays, 67 yards, 6:14; Northern Illinois 38–33)

Fourth quarter

- (11:51) NIU – John Richardson 45 yard field goal (Drive: 9 plays, 28 yards, 4:03; Northern Illinois 41–33)
- (9:07) CCU – Isaiah Likely 40 yard pass from Grayson McCall, Grayson McCall pass failed (Drive: 6 plays, 64 yards, 2:44; Northern Illinois 41–39)
- (6:40) CCU – Braydon Bennett 34 yard pass from Grayson McCall, Isaiah Likely pass successful (Drive: 1 plays, 34 yards, 0:09; Coastal Carolina 47–41)

=== Statistics ===
Statistic	Northern Illinois	Coastal Carolina
First downs	29	22
First downs rushing	18	9
First downs passing	9	13
First downs penalty	2	0
Third down efficiency	5–14	5–10
Fourth down efficiency	4–5	1–1
Total plays–net yards	88–516	55–514
Rushing attempts–net yards	55–335	25–199
Yards per rush	6.1	8.0
Yards passing	181	315
Pass completions–attempts	20–33	22–30
Interceptions thrown	0	0
Punt returns–total yards	1–0	0–0
Kickoff returns–total yards	6–120	4–92
Punts–average yardage	0–0	2–39.5
Fumbles–lost	2–1	0–0
Penalties–yards	2–10	7–64
Time of possession	39:20	20:40

Huskies passing
	C–A	Yds	TD–INT
Rocky Lombardi	20–33	181	2–0
Huskies rushing
	Car	Yds	TD
Jay Ducker	24	146	0
Antario Brown	12	105	1
Rocky Lombardi	8	66	1
Clint Ratkovich	6	13	1
Trayvon Rudolph	4	7	0
Huskies receiving
	Rec	Yds	TD
Cole Tucker	6	87	1
Miles Joiner	5	29	1
Jay Ducker	1	15	0
Trayvon Rudolph	2	15	0
Tristen Tewes	1	11	0
Clint Ratkovich	2	11	0
Fabian McCray	1	9	0
Messiah Travis	1	7	0
Billy Dozier	1	-3	0

Chanticleers passing
	C–A	Yds	TD–INT
Grayson McCall	22–30	315	4–0
Chanticleers rushing
	Car	Yds	TD
Braydon Bennett	6	108	2
Trustan Belton	8	52	0
Grayson McCall	10	40	0
Reese White	1	−1	0
Chanticleers receiving
	Rec	Yds	TD
Isaiah Likely	7	96	2
Jaivon Heiligh	7	94	0
Braydon Bennett	4	47	1
Trustan Belton	1	40	1
Kameron Brown	3	38	0
