= 2020 Cure Bowl =

Postseason college football bowl game

2020 FBC Mortgage Cure Bowl
- 6th Cure Bowl
| Liberty Flames | Coastal Carolina Chanticleers |
| (9–1) | (11–0) |
| Independent | Sun Belt |
| 37 | 34 |
| Head coach: Hugh Freeze | Head coach: Jamey Chadwell |
| AP / Coaches / CFP; 23 / 23 / NR | AP / Coaches / CFP; 9 / 11 / 12 |
| | 1 | 2 | 3 | 4 | OT | Total |
|---|---|---|---|---|---|---|
| Liberty | 14 | 3 | 7 | 10 | 3 | 37 |
| Coastal Carolina | 0 | 13 | 6 | 15 | 0 | 34 |
- Date: December 26, 2020
- Season: 2020
- Stadium: Camping World Stadium
- Location: Orlando, Florida
- MVP: Malik Willis (QB, Liberty)
- Favorite: Coastal Carolina by 6.5
- Referee: Ron Hudson (MAC)
- Attendance: 4,488

United States TV coverage
- Network: ESPN
- Announcers: Roy Philpott (play-by-play), Kelly Stouffer (analyst) and Alex Chappell (sideline)

The 2020 Cure Bowl was a college football bowl game played on December 26, 2020, with kickoff at 7:30 p.m. EST on ESPN. It was the 6th edition of the Cure Bowl, and was one of the 2020–21 bowl games concluding the 2020 FBS football season. Sponsored by mortgage lender FBC Mortgage, the game was officially known as the FBC Mortgage Cure Bowl. Liberty defeated Coastal Carolina in overtime, 37–34, to claim their second consecutive Cure Bowl victory.

== Teams ==
Based on conference tie-ins, the Cure Bowl was expected to feature teams from the American Athletic Conference (AAC) and the Sun Belt Conference. The contest matched independent Liberty against Coastal Carolina of the Sun Belt. The two teams had previously met 14 times, with each program winning seven times. They were due to play a regular season game in early December 2020, but it was canceled due to COVID-19 issues within Liberty's program.

=== Liberty Flames ===
Liberty entered the game with a 9–1 record, having only lost to NC State, and ranked 23rd in the AP Poll. This was Liberty's second bowl game in program history; after joining FBS in 2018, the Flames defeated Georgia Southern in the 2019 Cure Bowl.

=== Coastal Carolina Chanticleers ===
Coastal Carolina entered the game with an 11–0 record (8–0 in conference play) and ranked ninth in the AP Poll. The Chanticleers (Note: "Simply put, a chanticleer — pronounced SHON-ti-cleer — is a rooster.") defeated two ranked teams during the regular season, Louisiana and BYU, giving each of those programs their only loss. The BYU game was a hurriedly-scheduled substitute for the canceled Liberty game; it had been officially confirmed only two days before kickoff. The Chanticleers were due to play a rematch with Louisiana in the Sun Belt Championship Game, but it was cancelled due to positive COVID-19 cases within Coastal Carolina's program. This was the first-ever bowl game for the Coastal Carolina program, having joined FBS in 2017.

== Game summary ==
This became the first game of the 2020–21 bowl season to go to overtime. Tied at 34–34, Liberty was poised to score a go-ahead touchdown late in the fourth quarter. With a first-and-goal at Coastal Carolina's three-yard-line with 1:20 left to play, Liberty executed a running play designed not to score, to use up time on the clock. Coastal Carolina made no attempt to stop Liberty from scoring, so Liberty's ball carrier took a knee and lost two yards on the play. On second down, Liberty again appeared to try to stay out of the end zone, but as the Flames' running back approached the goal line, there was a fumble, which Coastal Carolina recovered. Coastal Carolina was not able to advance the ball significantly in the little time remaining, and the game went to overtime. Liberty had possession first in overtime; after running three plays that gained four yards, the Flames had a five-yard delay-of-game penalty, then successfully kicked a 44-yard field goal, to take a 37–34 lead. In Coastal Carolina's overtime possession, the Chanticleers had three incomplete passes, then attempted a 42-yard field goal that was blocked, leaving the final score at 37–34 for Liberty.

2020 FBC Mortgage Cure Bowl

| Quarter | 1 | 2 | 3 | 4 | OT | Total |
|---|---|---|---|---|---|---|
| Liberty | 14 | 3 | 7 | 10 | 3 | 37 |
| No. 12 Coastal Carolina | 0 | 13 | 6 | 15 | 0 | 34 |

at Camping World Stadium • Orlando, Florida

- Date: Saturday, December 26, 2020
- Game time: 7:30 p.m. EST
- Game weather: Clear • Temperature: 43 °F (6 °C) • Wind: N 4 mph
- Referee: Ron Hudson (MAC)
- TV announcers (ESPN): Roy Philpott (play-by-play), Kelly Stouffer (analyst) and Alex Chappell (sideline)
- ESPN game summary

Game information

First quarter

- (6:59) LIB – Malik Willis 5 yard rush, Alex Barbir kick (Drive: 10 plays, 64 yards, 4:54; Liberty 7–0)
- (0:06) LIB – Malik Willis 6 yard rush, Alex Barbir kick (Drive: 9 plays, 66 yards, 5:18; Liberty 14–0)

Second quarter

- (6:00) CCU – Massimo Biscardi 21 yard field goal (Drive: 12 plays, 66 yards, 6:11; Liberty 14–3)
- (2:02) CCU – Isaiah Likely 25 yard pass from Grayson McCall, Massimo Biscardi kick (Drive: 4 plays, 62 yards, 2:02; Liberty 14–10)
- (0:42) LIB – Alex Barbir 37 yard field goal (Drive: 7 plays, 40 yards, 1:20; Liberty 17–10)
- (0:00) CCU – Massimo Biscardi 33 yard field goal (Drive: 7 plays, 55 yards, 0:42; Liberty 17–13)

Third quarter

- (8:28) LIB – Malik Willis 10 yard rush, Alex Barbir kick (Drive: 1 play, 10 yards, 0:05; Liberty 24–13)
- (4:36) CCU – Greg Latushko 43 yard pass from Grayson McCall, 2-point pass failed (Drive: 7 plays, 90 yards, 3:52; Liberty 24–19)

Fourth quarter

- (13:22) LIB – Malik Willis 3 yard rush, Alex Barbir kick (Drive: 11 plays, 75 yards, 6:14; Liberty 31–19)
- (10:34) CCU – Grayson McCall 1 yard rush, Massimo Biscardi kick (Drive: 5 plays, 77 yards, 2:48; Liberty 31–26)
- (5:03) LIB – Alex Barbir 32 yard field goal (Drive: 10 plays, 61 yards, 5:31; Liberty 34–26)
- (3:01) CCU – Greg Latushko 5 yard pass from Grayson McCall, 2-point rush good (Drive: 7 plays, 72 yards, 2:02; Tied 34–34)

Overtime

- (OT) LIB – Alex Barbir 44 yard field goal (Drive: 4 plays, –1 yard; Liberty 37–34)

=== Statistics ===
| Statistics | LIB | CCU |
|---|---|---|
| First downs | 26 | 24 |
| Plays–yards | 71–475 | 65–483 |
| Rushes–yards | 42–255 | 33–165 |
| Passing yards | 220 | 318 |
| Passing: comp–att–int | 19–29–2 | 21–32–1 |
| Time of possession | 30:49 | 29:11 |

| Team | Category | Player | Statistics |
|---|---|---|---|
| Liberty | Passing | Malik Willis | 19/29, 220 yards, 2 INT |
| Liberty | Rushing | Malik Willis | 21 carries, 137 yards, 4 TD |
| Liberty | Receiving | DJ Stubbs | 5 receptions, 68 yards |
| Coastal Carolina | Passing | Grayson McCall | 21/32, 318 yards, 3 TD, 1 INT |
| Coastal Carolina | Rushing | Grayson McCall | 15 carries, 96 yards, 1 TD |
| Coastal Carolina | Receiving | Jaivon Heiligh | 13 receptions, 178 yards |

== See also ==
- 2020 Cheez-It Bowl, played at the same venue three days later
- 2021 Citrus Bowl, played at the same venue six days later
