= Grayson McCall =

American college football player (born 2000)

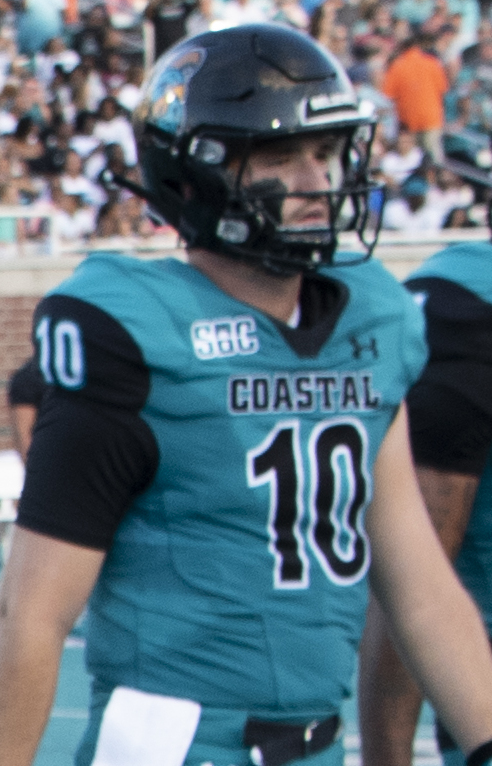
- McCall in 2023

Current position
- Title: Offensive analyst
- Team: Coastal Carolina
- Conference: Sun Belt

Biographical details
- Born: December 13, 2000 (age 25); Indian Trail, North Carolina, U.S.

Playing career
- 2019–2023: Coastal Carolina
- 2024: NC State
- Position: Quarterback

Coaching career (HC unless noted)
- 2025–present: Coastal Carolina (OA)

Accomplishments and honors

Awards
- As a player: 3× Sun Belt Player of the Year (2020–2022); Sun Belt Freshman of the Year (2020); 3× First-team All-Sun Belt (2020, 2021, 2022)

Grayson McCall (born December 13, 2000) is an American college football coach and former quarterback who is currently an offensive analyst for the Coastal Carolina Chanticleers. He played college football for the Division I Coastal Carolina Chanticleers from 2019 to 2023, serving as the starting quarterback from 2020 until his transfer to the NC State Wolfpack.

McCall won the Sun Belt Conference Player of the Year in three consecutive seasons from 2020 to 2022 and led NCAA Division I FBS football in average yards gained per attempt and passing efficiency in 2021, setting the NCAA record for passing efficiency in 2021 with a rating of 207.6, a record that would later be broken by LSU quarterback Jayden Daniels in 2023 at 208.0. As the starting quarterback, he led Coastal Carolina to several winning seasons, including their first-ever national ranking and bowl victories.

McCall transferred to NC State in 2024 for his final season of eligibility. During the sixth game of the 2024 season against Wake Forest, he suffered a head injury that led him to be stretchered off the field and taken to the hospital. He retired two weeks after the injury, citing concussion issues caused by the injury and previous concussions at Coastal Carolina. After stating his interest in coaching, he returned to Coastal Carolina in 2025 as an offensive analyst.

== Early years ==
McCall was born on December 13, 2000, in Indian Trail, North Carolina, United States. The second of three children between Jody and Lisa McCall, he has an older brother and a younger sister. At the age of 12, McCall joined a traveling Little League all-star baseball team that played in a televised tournament in Cooperstown, New York. McCall decided to quit baseball before high school. McCall attended Porter Ridge High School in Indian Trail, North Carolina.

He began playing for the football team as a freshman in 2015. As a sophomore in 2016, McCall recorded over 1,500 all-purpose yards and 19 touchdowns. Prior to the 2017 season, The Charlotte Observer noted McCall as a player to watch for in Union County high school football after his performance the prior season. McCall lived up to expectations given to him, being named NCHSAA Southwestern 4A Player of the Year after recording 1,414 passing yards and touchdowns, along with 907 rushing yards and 12 touchdowns as a junior. Entering his senior season in 2018, he, along with running back Jaylen Coleman, was expected to lead the Porter Ridge offense to the North Carolina High School Athletic Association (NCHSAA) 4A playoffs. Porter Ridge advanced to the NCHSAA 4A semifinals, where they lost 14–32 to East Forsyth High School. He was listed as a two-star recruit, ranking 66th as a dual-threat quarterback, 107th in North Carolina, and 2,839th nationally coming out of high school in the class of 2019. He committed to Coastal Carolina University on December 19, 2018, to play college football over offers from Army, Chattanooga, Eastern Kentucky, and Gardner-Webb.

College recruiting
Name	Hometown	School	Height	Weight	40^{‡}	Commit date
Grayson McCall; QB	Indian Trail, North Carolina	Porter Ridge High School	6 ft 3 in (1.91 m)	200 lb (91 kg)	4.65	Dec 19, 2018
Grayson McCall; QB	Recruit ratings: Rivals: 247Sports: (N/A)					

== College career ==
=== Coastal Carolina ===
In his freshman year at Coastal Carolina, McCall was listed as the third-string quarterback behind Fred Payton and Bryce Carpenter. He made his college debut against the Norfolk State Spartans on September 15, 2019, where he went in as the quarterback for the Chanticleers' last scoring drive, completing 3 passes for 30 yards which included a 14-yard passing touchdown and rushing twice for a total of 11 yards. McCall played again the following week against the UMass Minutemen, going 1-for-1 with a negative 5-yard play. He did not play another game in the 2019 season, taking a redshirt that would be applied on the 2020 season.

McCall fought for the Chanticleers' starting quarterback position as a redshirt freshman during the 2020 offseason, going against Payton and Carpenter during spring practice and fall camp. While trying to obtain the position, he had to be quarantined after contracting COVID-19 during the pandemic but managed to obtain the position after beating out both Payton, who hurt his Achilles during fall camp, and Carpenter to start the 2020 season against Kansas. During his first start against Kansas, McCall completed 11 of 18 passes for 133 yards with three passing touchdowns. He also recorded 11 carries and 73 rushing yards for 2 rushing touchdowns for a 38–23 win. His performance received national attention, earning him a Manning Award Star of the Week and a spot on the Week One Davey O'Brien Award Great 8 List. After the Kansas game, he continued to hold the starting quarterback position for the rest of the season. As the starting quarterback, he led the last place-projected Coastal Carolina football team to its first-ever undefeated regular season, first-ever appearance on the AP and Coaches Poll, peaking at number 12, first-ever Co-Sun Belt Conference championship, as well as its first-ever bowl game appearance in the 2020 Cure Bowl where they suffered their only loss on the season to Liberty. He also led Coastal Carolina to wins in big matchups between undefeated teams against Louisiana and BYU, the latter game was nicknamed Mormons vs. Mullets and received heavy coverage, becoming the most watched game on ESPNU since 2015. After the conclusion of the 2020 season, McCall was named the Sun Belt Conference Player of the Year and Sun Belt Freshman of the Year. He also received First-team All-Sun Belt and Football Writers Association of America (FWAA) Freshman All-American honors, FWAA Most Inspirational Freshman Award, and nominations for the Davey O'Brien Award, the Manning Award, and the Maxwell Award.

McCall entered the 2021 season as the Chanticleers' starting quarterback, being named to a multitude of preseason watch lists and teams, including Sun Belt Preseason Offensive Player of the Year, the Walter Camp Award, Davey O'Brien Award, Manning Award, and Maxwell Award watch lists. As the 22nd-ranked team in the nation, McCall started the season with a 52–14 win over The Citadel, going 16 for 19 with 262 yards and a touchdown. Following the season-opener, McCall continued to lead Coastal Carolina on an undefeated streak until Appalachian State upset them 27–30; he threw for 291 yards and a touchdown. Following the loss, the Chanticleers dropped from No. 14 to unranked nationally on the AP Poll after a close 35–28 win over Troy. During the game against Troy, McCall suffered a shoulder injury that knocked him out of play for two games. Returning as the starting quarterback against Texas State, he completed 22 of 28 passes for 319 yards and five touchdowns in a 35–21 win. The Chanticleers under McCall won the final game of the season and the 2021 Cure Bowl against Northern Illinois, ending the season 11–2. Setting an NCAA record in passing efficiency with a rating of 207.6 (which was broken in 2023 with a rating of 208.0 by LSU quarterback Jayden Daniels), previously set at 203.1 by Mac Jones in 2020, and leading in yards per pass attempt at 11.92 yards, McCall was named Sun Belt Player of the Year and received All-Sun Belt first team honors for the second year in a row. After the end of season in December, McCall stated his interest in transferring from Coastal Carolina to follow head coach Jamey Chadwell and offensive coordinator Willy Korn. After they committed to stay at Coastal Carolina, McCall did not enter the NCAA transfer portal, announcing his decision at a Sun Belt Conference media day with a shirt that read "I piss teal", a reference to Coastal Carolina's teal color scheme.

During the offseason, McCall signed a name, image, and likeness (NIL) deal with Darlington Raceway on July 27, 2022, becoming a promoter for the racetrack. The deal was the first NIL deal with a NASCAR-owned track. He entered the season as the Chanticleers' starting quarterback, being named to many preseason awards and watch lists for the second year in a row, such as the Johnny Unitas Golden Arm Award. In the season-opener against Army, McCall had three passing and one rushing touchdown in a 38–28 win. He continued to lead the team on an undefeated streak for six games until they lost to Old Dominion 21–49. McCall had 3 passing touchdowns that game to reach 72 career passing touchdowns, tying with Alex Ross for the most in Coastal Carolina history. He broke the record the following game against Marshall in a 24–13 win with one passing touchdown. In the game against Appalachian State on November 3, he suffered a foot injury that sidelined him for the rest of the regular season. Following the end of the regular season, McCall was named Sun Belt Player of the Year and onto the All-Sun Belt first team for the third year in a row. On December 12, it was announced that he would enter the NCAA transfer portal. While in the transfer portal, McCall returned from his injury to play against East Carolina in the Birmingham Bowl, but suffered an upper-body injury in the 29–53 loss. On January 1, 2023, McCall exited the transfer portal and stayed at Coastal Carolina after being recruited heavily by new head coach Tim Beck, despite previous head coach Chadwell leaving to coach at Liberty.

McCall and Darlington Raceway renewed the NIL deal for another year as a promoter on March 23, 2023. The season started with McCall being named to the Davey O'Brien preseason watch list along with being touted as a potential 2024 NFL draft prospect. McCall started his third season in a row as the Chanticleers' starting quarterback against UCLA, where they lost 13–27 despite having possession for most of the game. Coastal Carolina bounced back the next week against Jacksonville State with a 30–16 win, with McCall throwing his 80th career touchdown. In the October 21 game against Arkansas State, McCall suffered a head injury that knocked him unconscious. The injury required him to be carted off the field and sent to the hospital, where he was released the following day. Following the injury, he was out for most of the regular season with a longer-than-expected recovery process, citing concussion issues from past performances. McCall was on the roster for their last regular-season game against James Madison, but did not see any playing time. McCall entered the transfer portal for the second time on November 29, 2023.

=== NC State ===
On December 13, 2023, McCall announced that he would be transferring to NC State to play as a graduate student. During the offseason, McCall spoke with media saying that he transferred to NC State for the culture but also called the memories at Coastal Carolina "unbelievable". McCall entered the season on no preseason watch lists or awards, the first time since his true freshman season. Prior to the first game of the season against Western Carolina, McCall was named the starting quarterback of the Wolfpack, earning the job over freshman quarterbacks CJ Bailey and Lex Thomas. McCall led the team to a 38–21 win as the 24th-ranked team in the nation with three touchdowns and one interception. NC State lost their next game against the 14th-ranked Tennessee 10–51, with McCall calling his performance "embarrassing". In their next game against Louisiana Tech, he suffered a day-to-day injury, with Bailey taking the starting quarterback position. On October 5, he returned against Wake Forest as the starting quarterback, where he suffered a severe head injury in the first quarter of the game, resulting in his helmet coming off his head in the air after being hit simultaneously by two Demon Deacons defensive players. Following his injury, Bailey was again named the starting quarterback for the Wolfpack. On October 23, McCall announced his retirement from football, citing the injury against the Demon Deacons as well as the head injury he suffered the prior season with Coastal Carolina as the reason he would be stepping away.

=== College statistics ===
Legend
	Led NCAA Division I FBS
**Bold**	Career high

Season	Team	Games		Passing									Rushing			
Season	Team	GP	GS	Record	Comp	Att	Pct	Yards	Avg	TD	Int	Rate	Att	Yards	Avg	TD
2019	Coastal Carolina	2	0	0–0	4	4	100.0	25	6.3	1	0	235.0	2	11	5.5	0
2020	Coastal Carolina	**11**	**11**	**10–1**	172	250	68.8	2,488	10.0	26	3	184.3	**111**	**569**	**5.1**	**7**
2021	Coastal Carolina	**11**	**11**	**10–1**	176	241	**73.0**	**2,873**	**11.9**	**27**	3	**207.6**	93	290	3.1	4
2022	Coastal Carolina	**11**	**11**	9–2	**207**	**297**	69.7	2,700	9.1	24	2	171.4	91	195	2.1	6
2023	Coastal Carolina	7	7	4–3	151	224	67.4	1,919	8.6	10	**6**	147.8	53	48	0.9	1
2024	NC State	4	4	2–2	53	80	66.3	518	6.5	3	2	128.0	19	53	2.8	0
Career		46	44	35–9	763	1,096	69.6	10,523	9.6	91	16	174.7	369	1,166	3.2	18

== Coaching career ==
After McCall announced his retirement in October 2024, he stated he was interested in coaching football. On January 6, 2025, Coastal Carolina named McCall as an offensive analyst under offensive coordinator Drew Hollingshead.
