= Matt Hazel =

American football player (born 1992)

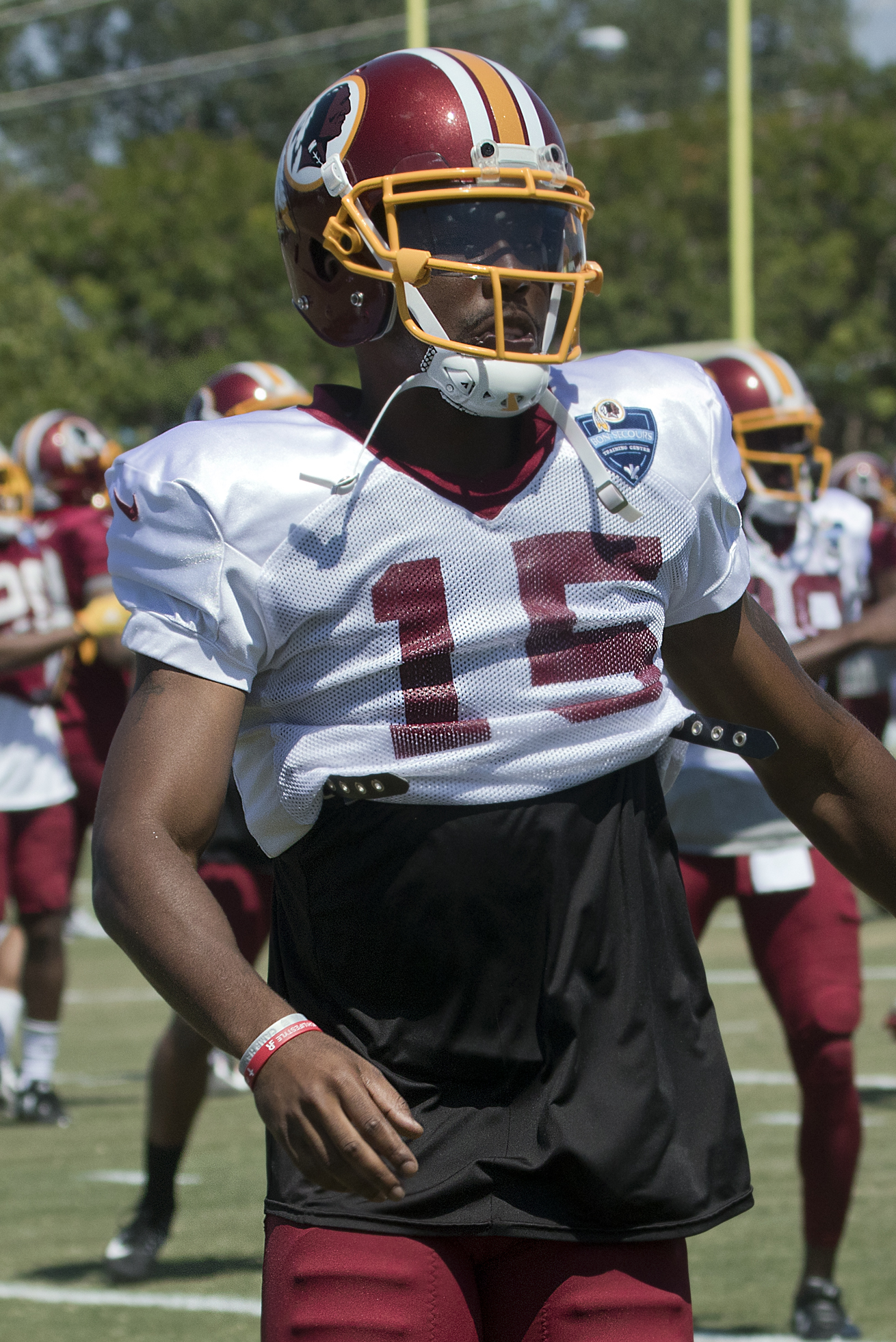
- Hazel with the Washington Redskins in 2017

No. 83, 14
- Position: Wide receiver

Personal information
- Born: January 23, 1992 (age 34); North Augusta, South Carolina, U.S.
- Listed height: 6 ft 1 in (1.85 m)
- Listed weight: 195 lb (88 kg)

Career information
- High school: North Augusta
- College: Coastal Carolina
- NFL draft: 2014: 6th round, 190th overall pick

Career history
- Miami Dolphins (2014–2015); Buffalo Bills (2016)*; Washington Redskins (2016–2017)*; Indianapolis Colts (2017); Cleveland Browns (2017); Indianapolis Colts (2018); Winnipeg Blue Bombers (2019)*; Lazio Ducks (2021-2022)
- * Offseason or practice squad member only

Awards and highlights
- 2× First-team All-Big South (2012, 2013); Second-team All-Big South (2011)

Career NFL statistics
- Receptions: 1
- Receiving yards: 1
- Stats at Pro Football Reference

Matt Hazel (born January 23, 1992) is an American former professional football player who was a wide receiver in the National Football League (NFL). He played college football for the Coastal Carolina Chanticleers. He was selected by the Miami Dolphins in the sixth round of the 2014 NFL draft.

== Early life ==
A native of North Augusta, South Carolina, Hazel attended North Augusta High School where he recorded 75 catches, 1,193 receiving yards, and 18 touchdowns as a senior while leading North Augusta to the second round of the playoffs.

He was rated a two-star recruit by Rivals.com.

== College career ==
Hazel attended Coastal Carolina University from 2010 to 2013, where he was a member of the Coastal Carolina Chanticleers football team. As a true freshman in 2010, he played 11 games (three starts) and caught 20 balls for 276 yards and five touchdowns. In 2011, he started 9 of 11 games, with 32 catches for 488 yards and six touchdowns. He started all 13 games in 2012 and posted 61 catches for 799 yards and eight touchdowns, and was named a first-team All-Big South selection. He started all 14 games in 2013, producing 70 catches for 990 yards and nine touchdowns, earning first-team All-Big South honors for the second year in a row.

He set several Coastal Carolina career and single-season records. His 183 career receptions, and 70 receptions in 2013, are both CCU records. His 2,553 career receiving yards and 28 career receiving touchdowns are both second in CCU history. He was the third player in school history to participate in the East-West Shrine Game, joining Jerome Simpson and Josh Norman.

== Professional career ==
Pre-draft measurables
| Height | Weight | Arm length | Hand span | 40-yard dash | 20-yard shuttle | Three-cone drill | Vertical jump | Broad jump | Bench press |
|---|---|---|---|---|---|---|---|---|---|
| 6 ft 1 in (1.85 m) | 198 lb (90 kg) | 31 3/8 in (0.80 m) | 9 1/8 in (0.23 m) | 4.50 s | 4.20 s | 7.08 s | 36.5 in (0.93 m) | 9 ft 10 in (3.00 m) | 15 reps |
All values from NFL Combine

=== Miami Dolphins ===
Hazel was selected by the Miami Dolphins in the sixth round (190th overall) of the 2014 NFL draft. He was waived by the Dolphins on August 30, 2014 and was signed to the practice squad the next day. He was promoted to the active roster on December 20, 2014.

On August 27, 2016, Hazel was waived by the Dolphins.

=== Buffalo Bills ===
On September 5, 2016, Hazel was signed to the Buffalo Bills' practice squad. He was released by the team on October 4, 2016.

=== Washington Redskins ===
On October 25, 2016, Hazel was signed to the Washington Redskins' practice squad. He signed a futures contract with the Redskins on January 2, 2017.

On September 2, 2017, Hazel was waived by the Redskins.

=== Indianapolis Colts (first stint) ===
Hazel was claimed off waivers by the Indianapolis Colts on September 3, 2017. He was waived on September 16, 2017 but was re-signed two days later. He was waived again on September 25, 2017 and re-signed to the practice squad. He was promoted back to the active roster on November 9, 2017. He was waived again on November 28, 2017 and re-signed to the practice squad on December 11.

=== Cleveland Browns ===
On December 13, 2017, Hazel was signed by the Cleveland Browns off the Colts' practice squad.

On April 16, 2018, Hazel signed his restricted free-agent tender with the Browns for the 2018 season.

Hazel was waived by the Browns on April 30, 2018.

=== Indianapolis Colts (second stint) ===
On August 12, 2018, Hazel was signed by the Colts. He was waived/injured on August 23, 2018 and placed on injured reserve. He was released on September 11, 2018.

=== Winnipeg Blue Bombers ===
On April 30, 2019, Hazel signed with the Winnipeg Blue Bombers of the Canadian Football League. He was released on June 8, 2019.

=== Lazio Ducks ===
In 2021, Hazel signed with the Lazio Ducks of the Italian Football League in Rome, Italy. Hazel had 67 receptions for 977 yards and 10 touchdowns on the season for the Ducks. Hazel resigned with the Ducks for the 2022 season.
