= Lorenzo Taliaferro =

American football player (1991–2020)

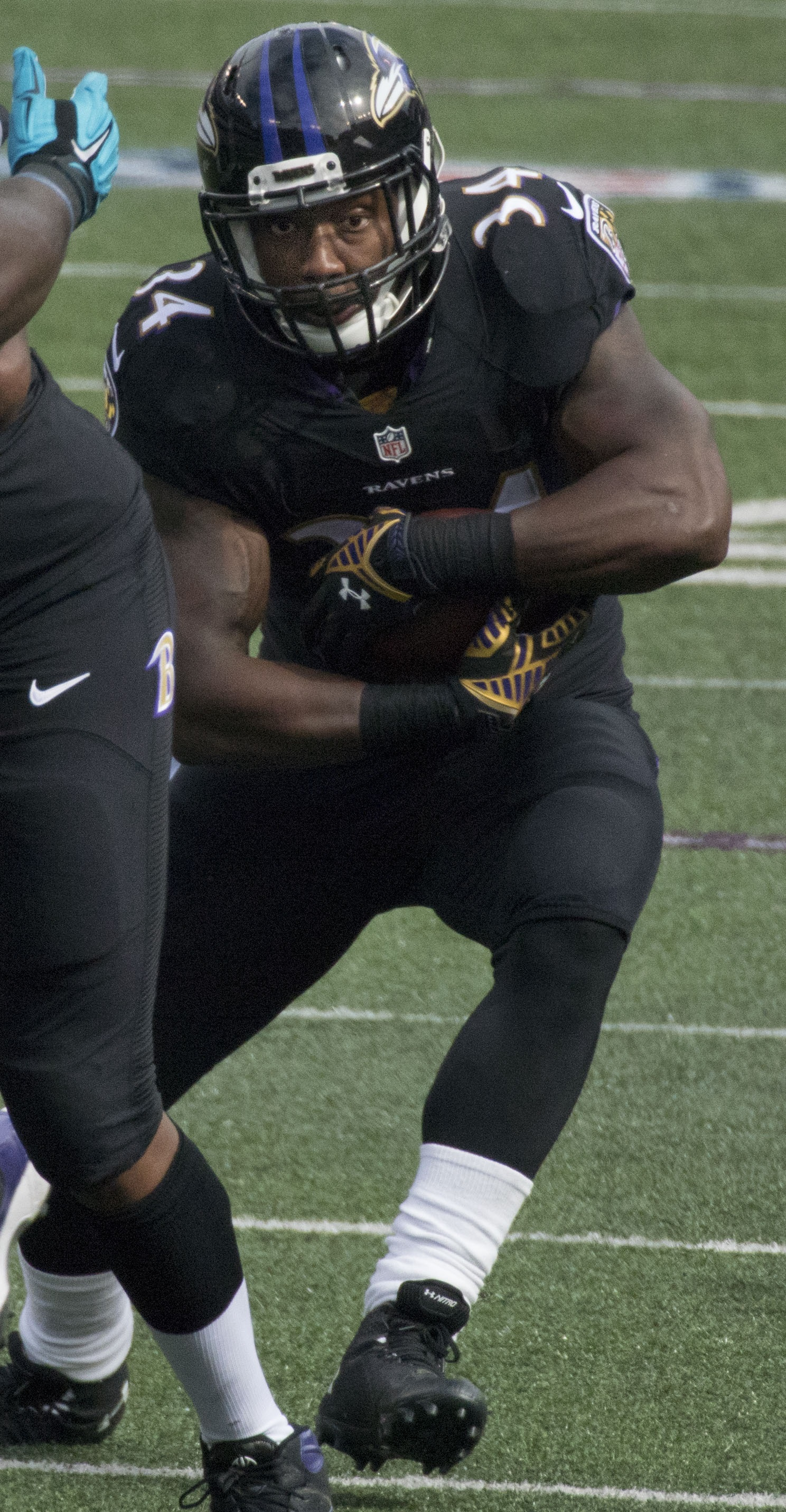
- Taliaferro with the Baltimore Ravens in 2014

No. 34
- Position: Running back

Personal information
- Born: December 23, 1991; Yorktown, Virginia, U.S.
- Died: December 16, 2020 (aged 28); Williamsburg, Virginia, U.S.
- Listed height: 6 ft 0 in (1.83 m)
- Listed weight: 225 lb (102 kg)

Career information
- High school: Bruton (Williamsburg, Virginia)
- College: Lackawanna (2010–2011); Coastal Carolina (2012–2013)
- NFL draft: 2014: 4th round, 138th overall pick

Career history
- Baltimore Ravens (2014–2016); Hamilton Tiger-Cats (2018)*
- * Offseason or practice squad member only

Career NFL statistics
- Rushing yards: 339
- Rushing average: 4.1
- Rushing touchdowns: 5
- Receptions: 16
- Receiving yards: 153
- Receiving touchdowns: 0
- Stats at Pro Football Reference

Lorenzo Taliaferro (December 23, 1991 – December 16, 2020) was an American professional football player who was a running back in the National Football League (NFL). He played college football at Lackawanna College and Coastal Carolina and was selected by the Baltimore Ravens in the fourth round of the 2014 NFL draft.

== College career ==
Taliaferro attended Lackawanna College and played for coach Mark Duda on a scholarship until he received a football scholarship to Coastal Carolina. Taliaferro finished 11th in the 2013 Walter Payton Award voting. In May 2014, he shared the SAAC Male Athlete of the Year award for 2014 with Pedro Ribeiro. In July 2014, he was voted Big South Male Athlete of the Year.

== Professional career ==
Pre-draft measurables
Height	Weight	Arm length	Hand span	40-yard dash	10-yard split	20-yard split	20-yard shuttle	Three-cone drill	Vertical jump	Broad jump	Bench press
6 ft 0 1/4 in (1.84 m)	229 lb (104 kg)	32 in (0.81 m)	8 3/8 in (0.21 m)	4.58 s	1.60 s	2.68 s	4.22 s	6.88 s	34.0 in (0.86 m)	10 ft 0 in (3.05 m)	22 reps

Taliaferro was selected by the Baltimore Ravens with the 138th pick in the 2014 NFL draft. On September 21, 2014, Taliaferro had the first touches of his NFL career rushing 18 times for 91 yards and a touchdown in a week 3 victory over the Cleveland Browns. Taliaferro had his first multi-rushing touchdown game against the Cincinnati Bengals with 2 touchdowns. He was placed on injured reserve on December 16, 2014, ending his rookie season. He finished his rookie season with 68 carries for 282 yards (4.3 yards per attempt) and 4 rushing touchdowns in 13 games. He also had 8 receptions for 114 yards, and returned one kickoff for 15 yards.

Taliaferro returned in 2015 and began the season as the third-string running back behind veteran Justin Forsett and rookie Javorius Allen. On October 14, 2015, Taliaferro was added to season-ending injury/reserve after a nagging foot injury plagued him all season. After playing Week 4 against the Pittsburgh Steelers, he finished his season with 13 carries for 47 yards and a touchdown in 3 games. He also caught 5 passes for 29 yards.

On August 30, 2016, Taliaferro was placed on the physically unable to perform (PUP) list to start the 2016 season. He was activated from the PUP list on October 22, 2016. He was placed on injured reserve on December 13, 2016. He had just four touches: a rush for no yards and three catches for 10 yards.

On September 1, 2017, Taliaferro was waived by the Ravens during final roster cuts.

On February 14, 2018, it was reported that Taliaferro would be participating in The Spring League in 2018.

Taliaferro signed with the Hamilton Tiger-Cats of the Canadian Football League for the 2018 season. After making several tackles as a defensive player, and receiving no offensive touches during the preseason, Taliaferro was released by Hamilton on June 6.

== Death ==
Taliaferro died at age 28 on December 16, 2020, in Williamsburg, Virginia, a week shy of his 29th birthday. His death was reported to have been caused by a heart attack induced by cocaine and fentanyl, according to the Virginia Office of the Chief Medical Examiner.
