= Isaiah Likely =

American football player (born 2000)

No. 9 – New York Giants
- Position: Tight end
- Roster status: Active

Personal information
- Born: April 18, 2000 (age 26); Cambridge, Massachusetts, U.S.
- Listed height: 6 ft 4 in (1.93 m)
- Listed weight: 241 lb (109 kg)

Career information
- High school: Everett (Everett, Massachusetts); Malden (Malden, Massachusetts)
- College: Coastal Carolina (2018–2021)
- NFL draft: 2022: 4th round, 139th overall pick

Career history
- Baltimore Ravens (2022–2025); New York Giants (2026–present)

Awards and highlights
- Second-team All-American (2021); 2× First-team All-Sun Belt (2020, 2021); Third-team All-Sun Belt (2019)

Career NFL statistics as of Week 10, 2026
- Receptions: 190
- Receiving yards: 2,143
- Receiving touchdowns: 22
- Stats at Pro Football Reference

Isaiah Leroy Likely (born April 17, 2000) is an American professional football tight end for the New York Giants of the National Football League (NFL). He played college football for the Coastal Carolina Chanticleers and was selected by the Baltimore Ravens in the fourth round and 139th overall pick of the 2022 NFL draft.

== Early life ==
Likely grew up in Cambridge, Massachusetts and attended Malden High School before transferring to Everett High School for his senior year. As a junior, he caught 59 passes for 917 yards with 11 touchdowns.

== College career ==
Likely attended Coastal Carolina University. As a freshman in the 2018 season, Likely caught 12 passes for 106 yards and five touchdowns in seven games. He was named third-team All-Sun Belt Conference after finishing his sophomore season with 32 receptions for 431 receiving yards and five touchdowns. He had six receptions for 107 yards and a touchdown in the 24–21 victory over Texas State in the Chanticleers' last game. Likely was named first-team All-Sun Belt and a second-team All-American by Pro Football Focus after catching 30 passes for 601 yards and five touchdowns as a junior. He had three receptions for 118 yards and a touchdown in a 34–23 victory over Appalachian State. During his senior year, Likely was named the Sun Belt Player of the Week after catching eight passes for 232 yards and four touchdowns in a 52–20 win over Arkansas State. Likely tied the NCAA record for longest touchdown reception on his first of the four touchdowns with a 99-yard reception. He repeated as a first-team All-Sun Belt selection after catching 59 passes for 912 yards and a team-high 12 touchdowns. Likely led the Sun Belt in receiving touchdowns in the 2021 season.

== Professional career ==
Pre-draft measurables
Height	Weight	Arm length	Hand span	Wingspan	40-yard dash	10-yard split	20-yard split	20-yard shuttle	Three-cone drill	Vertical jump	Broad jump
6 ft 4 1/2 in (1.94 m)	245 lb (111 kg)	31 7/8 in (0.81 m)	10 in (0.25 m)	6 ft 6 1/8 in (1.98 m)	4.83 s	1.70 s	2.79 s	4.57 s	7.39 s	36.0 in (0.91 m)	10 ft 3 in (3.12 m)
All values from NFL Combine/Pro Day

=== Baltimore Ravens ===
==== 2022 season ====
Likely was selected by the Baltimore Ravens in the fourth round, 139th overall, of the 2022 NFL draft.

Likely spent his rookie season as the second tight end on the depth chart behind Mark Andrews. He caught his first NFL touchdown in a 27–22 win over the Tampa Bay Buccaneers in Week 8. In Week 18, he had eight receptions for 103 receiving yards in the 16–27 loss to the Cincinnati Bengals. In his rookie season, Likely appeared in 16 games, of which he started two. He finished with 36 receptions for 373 receiving yards and three receiving touchdowns.

==== 2023 season ====
Likely started slowly in the 2023 season as he was once again second on the depth chart behind Mark Andrews. He recorded four receptions for 42 yards in a 37–3 blowout win over the Seattle Seahawks in Week 9. Andrews would suffer a severe ankle injury in the Ravens' Week 11 34–20 win over the Cincinnati Bengals and miss the rest of the regular season. Likely became the lead tight end in Andrew's absence and made the most of his opportunity, recording 21 receptions for 322 yards and five touchdowns in the last six games of the season. Likely's best game came in Week 14 against the Los Angeles Rams, where he had five receptions for 83 yards and a touchdown as the Ravens won in overtime 37–31. Likely recorded his first multi-touchdown game of his career in Week 17 as he caught two passes for 42 yards and two touchdowns in a 56–19 rout of the Miami Dolphins. Likely finished the season with 30 receptions for 411 yards and five touchdowns.

Likely's hot streak continued into the postseason. In the Divisional Round against the Houston Texans, he recorded two receptions for 34 yards and a touchdown in a 34–10 rout.

==== 2024 season ====
In Week 1 of the 2024 season, Likely had a career-high 111 yards on nine receptions with one touchdown in the 27–20 loss to the Kansas City Chiefs. He narrowly missed scoring the potential game-winning touchdown as time expired when he barely landed out of bounds. In Week 5 against the Cincinnati Bengals, he had two receiving touchdowns in the 41–38 overtime win. Likely finished the 2024 season with 42 receptions for 477 yards and six touchdowns. In the team's Divisional Round loss to the Buffalo Bills, Likely recorded a receiving touchdown.

==== 2025 season ====
On July 30, 2025, it was announced that Likely would require surgery to repair a broken bone in his foot, ruling him out for six weeks. He was not placed on injured reserve, but missed Baltimore's first three games. Likely made his season debut in Week 4 against the Kansas City Chiefs, but was not targeted in the 37–20 loss. In the Week 5 matchup versus the Houston Texans, Likely registered one catch on one target for 12 yards in the blowout loss. During the loss the next week against the Los Angeles Rams, Likely caught the ball two times on two targets for six yards. Against the Chicago Bears in Week 7, Likely helped the Ravens win by securing both of his targets for eight yards. In Week 8 against the Miami Dolphins, Likely caught 3-of-4 targets for 60 yards in a 28–6 win. In a Week 13 matchup against the Cincinnati Bengals on Thanksgiving, Likely fumbled a pass at the one-yard line that would result in a touchback. He finished the 2025 season with 27 receptions for 307 yards and one touchdown in 14 games.

=== New York Giants ===
On March 12, 2026, Likely signed a three-year, $40 million contract with the New York Giants.

In his debut game with the Giants in Week 1, Likely caught 8 passes for 78 yards and two touchdowns, helping lead New York to a 28–20 win against the rival Dallas Cowboys.

== Career statistics ==
=== NFL ===
Legend
**Bold**	Career high

==== Regular season ====
Year	Team	Games		Receiving					Fumbles	
Year	Team	GP	GS	Rec	Yds	Avg	Lng	TD	Fum	Lost
2022	BAL	16	2	36	373	10.4	34	3	0	0
2023	BAL	17	8	30	411	**13.7**	54	5	0	0
2024	BAL	16	9	**42**	**477**	11.4	49	**6**	1	**1**
2025	BAL	14	7	27	307	11.4	43	1	**2**	**1**
2026	NYG	9	9	55	575	10.5	**66**	7	2	0
Career		72	35	190	2,143	11.3	66	21	5	2

==== Postseason ====
Year	Team	Games		Receiving					Fumbles	
Year	Team	GP	GS	Rec	Yds	Avg	Lng	TD	Fum	Lost
2022	BAL	1	0	0	0	0.0	0	0	0	0
2023	BAL	2	1	4	50	12.5	19	**1**	0	0
2024	BAL	2	0	**7**	**126**	**18.0**	**39**	**1**	0	0
Career		5	1	11	176	16.0	39	2	0	0

=== College ===
Season	Team	GP	Receiving			
Season	Team	GP	Rec	Yds	Avg	TD
2018	Coastal Carolina	7	12	106	8.8	5
2019	Coastal Carolina	12	32	431	13.5	5
2020	Coastal Carolina	10	30	601	20.0	5
2021	Coastal Carolina	13	59	912	15.5	12
Career		42	133	2,050	15.4	27
