= Jerome Simpson =

American football player (born 1986)

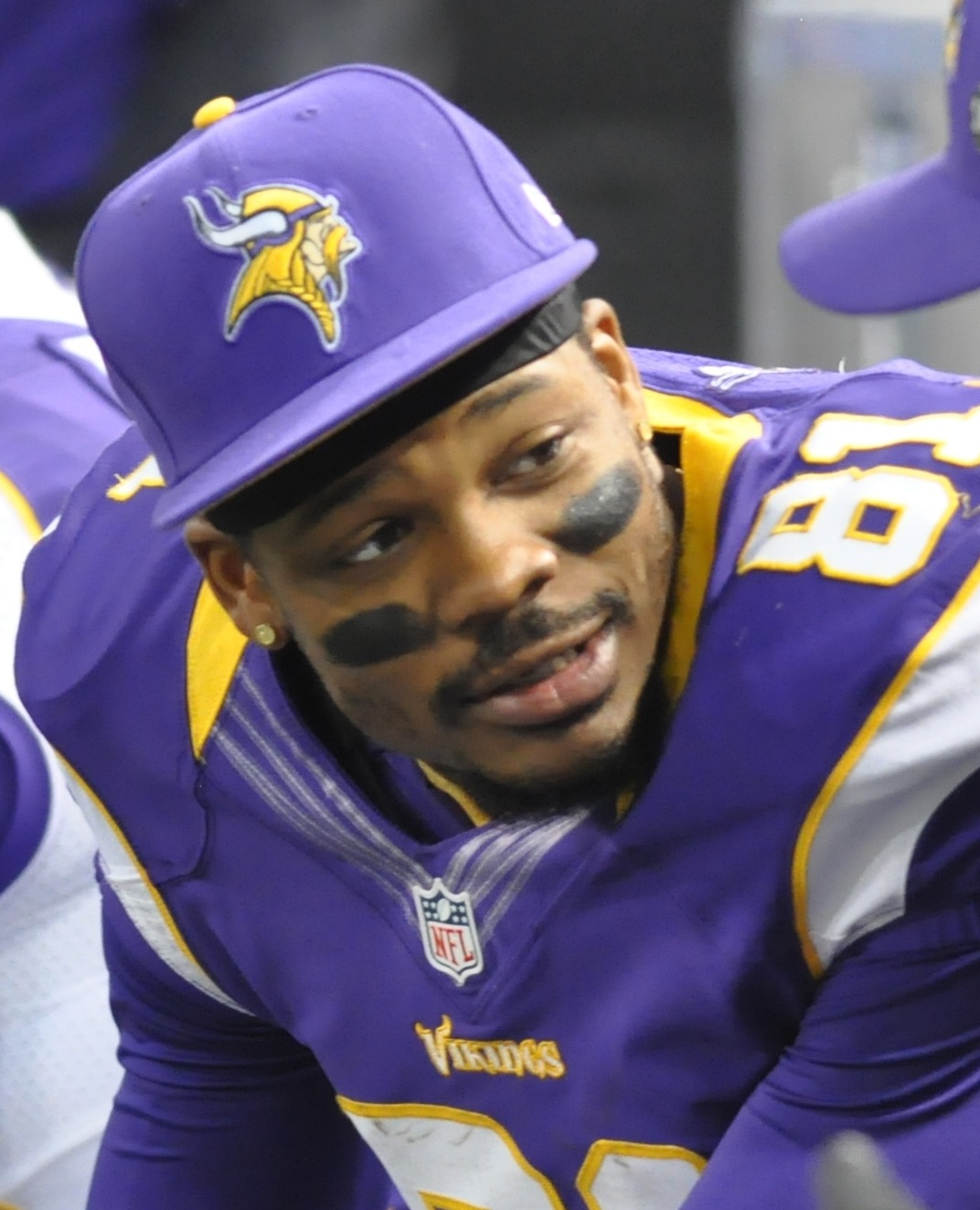
- Simpson with the Minnesota Vikings in 2012

No. 89, 81, 14
- Position: Wide receiver

Personal information
- Born: February 4, 1986 (age 40); Reidsville, North Carolina, U.S.
- Listed height: 6 ft 2 in (1.88 m)
- Listed weight: 190 lb (86 kg)

Career information
- High school: Reidsville (NC)
- College: Coastal Carolina (2004–2007)
- NFL draft: 2008: 2nd round, 46th overall pick

Career history
- Cincinnati Bengals (2008–2011); Minnesota Vikings (2012–2014); San Francisco 49ers (2015)

Awards and highlights
- Second-team All-American (2006); 2× First-team All-Big South (2006, 2007); Second-team All-Big South (2005); Big South Freshman of the Year (2004)

Career NFL statistics
- Receptions: 150
- Receiving yards: 2,058
- Receiving touchdowns: 9
- Stats at Pro Football Reference

Jerome Louis Simpson (born February 4, 1986) is an American former professional football player who was a wide receiver in the National Football League (NFL). He was selected by the Cincinnati Bengals in the second round of the 2008 NFL draft. He also played for the Minnesota Vikings and San Francisco 49ers. Simpson played college football for the Coastal Carolina Chanticleers.

== Early life ==
Simpson participated in football, basketball, and track while attending Reidsville High School in Reidsville, North Carolina. As a receiver in football, Simpson was an All-State selection as he led the Rams to consecutive 2AA state titles in 2002 and 2003. In his senior season, Simpson won team MVP and set a championship record with 13 receptions for 133 yards and also added a 62-yard touchdown pass. He missed three games his final season, but still managed to total 96 receptions for 1,324 yards and 14 touchdowns, becoming the team's all-time receptions leader. He also played in the North Carolina Shrine Bowl and in the East–West annual game.

In basketball, Simpson led the Rams to a 2A state basketball championship in 2003. He scored 19 points in the title game and won team MVP honors. He also ran on the 2A state champion 4x400-meter relay team with a time of 3:21 in track.

== College career ==
=== Freshman season ===
Jerome Simpson enrolled at Coastal Carolina University in 2004 and started all 11 games as a true freshman at receiver. In the season opener against Morehead State, Simpson recorded four catches for 59 yards and two scores in his collegiate debut. The following game, against Davidson, Simpson totaled 89 yards on six receptions for a touchdown. Against Charleston Southern University, Simpson recorded his first ever 100-yard receiving game. He finished the season with 26 catches for 419 yards and eight touchdowns and was honored as the Big South Conference Freshman of the Year.

=== Sophomore season ===
Simpson started six out of eleven games as a sophomore. He was named second-team All-Big South and to the South Carolina All-Star Team. He led the team with 33 receptions for 527 yards and nine touchdowns, all single-season school records. In his best game of the season, a victory over James Madison, Simpson set a school record with 10 receptions for 162 yards and two touchdowns. Against Savannah State, Simpson set another school-record with a 60-yard reception for a touchdown.

=== Junior season ===
In 2006, Simpson started in 10 of 12 games. He was named first-team All-Big South, second-team AP All-American and South Carolina All-Star selections. Teaming with quarterback Tyler Thigpen, Simpson had 61 receptions for 1,077 yards and a Big South record 16 touchdowns, which were also school records. Against Georgia Southern, Simpson set a school record with 207 yards and two scores on only eight receptions. Against No. 3 Furman, he recorded 151 yards and two touchdowns, including the game-winning touchdown reception. In the school's first ever Division I-AA NCAA Football Playoff appearance, Simpson recorded 132 yards and two touchdowns against No. 1 Appalachian State. Simpson led the Big South with five games of 100 yards receiving or more.

=== Senior season ===
In 2007, Simpson broke all school career receiving records while playing in all 11 games. He posted 41 receptions for 697 yards and 11 touchdowns, all lower than his totals from his junior year.

== Professional career ==
Pre-draft measurables
Height	Weight	Arm length	Hand span	40-yard dash	10-yard split	20-yard split	20-yard shuttle	Three-cone drill	Vertical jump	Broad jump
6 ft 1 3/4 in (1.87 m)	199 lb (90 kg)	34 1/4 in (0.87 m)	11 in (0.28 m)	4.47 s	1.55 s	2.57 s	4.52 s	7.08 s	41.5 in (1.05 m)	11 ft 4 in (3.45 m)
All values from NFL Combine/Pro Day

=== Cincinnati Bengals ===
Jerome Simpson was selected in the second round, 46th overall by the Cincinnati Bengals in the 2008 NFL draft. He was signed to a four-year contract but did not have any receptions during limited playing time in 2009. Due to injuries to Terrell Owens and Chad Ochocinco, Simpson made his second career start in Week 16 of the 2010 season and had a breakout performance, catching 6 passes for 124 yards and two touchdowns. He followed it up with 12 catches, 124 yards, and a touchdown in a game against the Baltimore Ravens to end the season with 18 receptions.

In Week 16 of the 2011 season, Simpson did a front-flip over Arizona Cardinals linebacker Daryl Washington to score a touchdown and landed on his feet. This move was also touted to be one of the best plays of the decade and was #1 on the year's top 10 plays.

=== Minnesota Vikings ===
Simpson signed with the Minnesota Vikings on April 24, 2012. The deal was worth $2 million over one year. He was suspended for the first three games of the 2012 season for violating the NFL's substance abuse policy. Simpson re-signed a one-year contract with the Vikings on March 12, 2013.

On March 14, 2014, Simpson re-signed a one-year contract with the Vikings. The Vikings released him on September 18.

=== San Francisco 49ers ===
Simpson signed a two-year contract with the San Francisco 49ers on March 5, 2015. Simpson was suspended for six games due to violating the leagues substance abuse policy stemming back to a 2014 arrest. Simpson was activated by the 49ers on October 23, 2015. On August 27, 2016, Simpson was released by the 49ers.

== Police investigation ==
In September 2011, police searched Simpson's Crestview Hills, Kentucky townhome after intercepting a package to be delivered to his home containing 2.5 pounds of marijuana. When police arrived at Simpson's home, Simpson's girlfriend asked if they had a search warrant. They did not have one. After the search warrant was issued, the police found six more pounds of marijuana, scales, and empty packages similar to the one they had intercepted. Simpson's teammate Anthony Collins was at the residence and was also questioned by the police. No arrests were made. On January 19, 2012, Simpson was indicted in Covington, Kentucky for "Trafficking in more than eight ounces and less than five pounds of marijuana", a Class D felony, which carries a one to five-year prison sentence if convicted. The NFL stated it would wait until the police investigation was complete to decide if it would discipline Simpson. On April 5, 2012, Simpson was sentenced to 15 days in jail, 200 hours of community service, and three years probation. He would also have to undergo drug testing and pay a $7,500 fine plus court costs.
