= List of Georgia State Panthers in the NFL draft =

This is a list of Georgia State Panthers football players in the NFL draft.

== Key ==
B	Back	K	Kicker	NT	Nose tackle
C	Center	LB	Linebacker	FB	Fullback
DB	Defensive back	P	Punter	HB	Halfback
DE	Defensive end	QB	Quarterback	WR	Wide receiver
DT	Defensive tackle	RB	Running back	G	Guard
E	End	T	Offensive tackle	TE	Tight end

== Selections ==
Year	Round	Pick	Player	Team	Position
2012	6	189	Christo Bilukidi	Oakland Raiders	DE
2014	7	232	Ulrick John	Indianapolis Colts	T
2017	6	209	Robert Davis	Washington Redskins	WR
2024	6	202	Travis Glover	Green Bay Packers	T
2026	3	84	Ted Hurst	Tampa Bay Buccaneers	WR

== Notable undrafted players ==
Note: No drafts held before 1920

Debut year	Player name	Position	Debut NFL/AFL team	Notes
2013	Emmanuel Ogbuehi	TE	Washington Redskins	
2014	Albert Wilson	WR	Kansas City Chiefs	
2016	Wil Lutz	PK	Baltimore Ravens	
2018	Chandon Sullivan	CB	Philadelphia Eagles	
2019	Penny Hart	WR	Indianapolis Colts	
2019	Chase Middleton	LB	Houston Texans	
2020	Brandon Wright	K/P	Jacksonville Jaguars	
2022	Roger Carter	TE	Los Angeles Rams	
2023	Quavian White	CB	Arizona Cardinals	
2025	Ben Chukwuma	OT	Tampa Bay Buccaneers	
