= Ogbuehi =

Ogbuehi is a surname. Notable people with the surname include:

- Cedric Ogbuehi (born 1992), American football offensive tackle
- Emmanuel Ogbuehi (born 1990), American football tight end
