= Haydel =

Haydel is a surname. Notable people with the surname include:

- Hal Haydel (1944–2018), American baseball player
- Jeremiah Haydel (born 1999), American football player

== See also ==
- Hadl, a surname
