= 2020 Sun Belt Conference football season =

- League: NCAA Division I Football Bowl Subdivision
- Sport: Football
- Duration: September 3, 2020 – December 26, 2020
- Teams: 10

2021 NFL Draft
- Top draft pick: CB Shemar Jean-Charles, Appalachian State
- Picked by: Green Bay Packers, 178th overall

Regular season
- Season champions: Coastal Carolina & Louisiana
- Season MVP: QB Grayson McCall, Coastal Carolina
- East champions: Coastal Carolina
- West champions: Louisiana

Championship Game cancelled

Seasons
- ← 2019 2021 →

2020 Sun Belt Conference football standings
	Conf.			Overall
Team	W		L	W		L
East Division
No. 14 Coastal Carolina xy+	8	–	0	11	–	1
Appalachian State	6	–	2	9	–	3
Georgia Southern	4	–	4	8	–	5
Georgia State	4	–	4	6	–	4
Troy	3	–	4	5	–	6
West Division
No. 15 Louisiana xy+	7	–	1	10	–	1
South Alabama	3	–	5	4	–	7
Arkansas State	2	–	6	4	–	7
Texas State	2	–	6	2	–	10
Louisiana–Monroe	0	–	7	0	–	10
Championship: Louisiana at Coastal Carolina (Canceled)
+ – Conference co-champions; x – Division champion/co-champions; y – Championship game participant; Rankings from AP Poll

The 2020 Sun Belt Conference football season was the 20th season of college football play for the Sun Belt Conference. The season began September 3, 2020 and concluded December 26, 2020 as part of the 2020–21 NCAA Division I FBS football season. The Sun Belt consists of 10 members in two divisions. The conference released its schedule on February 28, 2020, but numerous changes were made due to the COVID-19 pandemic.

== Preseason ==
The conference released its preseason media poll and all-conference teams on August 25, 2020.

=== Preseason media poll ===
East Division

1. Appalachian State (9) – 49 pts
2. Georgia Southern – 36 pts
3. Troy (1) – 32 pts
4. Georgia State – 20 pts
5. Coastal Carolina – 13 pts

West Division

1. Louisiana (7) – 47 pts
2. Arkansas State (2) – 40 pts
3. South Alabama (1) – 22 pts
4. Texas State – 21 pts
5. Louisiana–Monroe – 20 pts

=== All-conference preseason teams ===
Preseason All-Sun Belt

- Offensive Player of the Year: Zac Thomas (Senior, Appalachian State quarterback)
- Defensive Player of the Year: Carlton Martial (Junior, Troy linebacker)

Position	Player	Team
First Team Offense
QB	Zac Thomas	Appalachian State
RB	Elijah Mitchell	Louisiana
RB	Josh Johnson	Louisiana–Monroe
OL	Noah Hannon	Appalachian State
OL	Baer Hunter	Appalachian State
OL	Cooper Hodges	Appalachian State
OL	Jarrett Horst	Arkansas State
OL	Shamarious Gilmore	Georgia State
TE	Josh Pederson	Louisiana–Monroe
WR	Cory Sutton	Appalachian State
WR	Jonathan Adams	Arkansas State
WR	Kaylon Geiger	Troy
First Team Defense
DL	Demetrius Taylor	Appalachian State
DL	Tarron Jackson	Coastal Carolina
DL	Raymond Johnson	Georgia Southern
DL	Will Choloh	Troy
LB	Rashad Byrd	Georgia Southern
LB	Joe Dillon	Louisiana
LB	Carlton Martial	Troy
DB	Shaun Jolly	Appalachian State
DB	Kenderick Duncan Jr.	Georgia Southern
DB	Corey Straughter	Louisiana–Monroe
DB	Dell Pettus	Troy
First Team Special Teams
K	Blake Grupe	Arkansas State
P	Rhys Burns	Louisiana
RS	Wesley Kennedy III	Georgia Southern

Position	Player	Team
Second Team Offense
QB	Levi Lewis	Louisiana
RB	Trey Ragas	Louisiana
RB	C. J. Marable	Coastal Carolina
OL	Ryan Neuzil	Appalachian State
OL	Jacob Still	Arkansas State
OL	Max Mitchell	Louisiana
OL	O'Cyrus Torrence	Louisiana
OL	TJ Fiailoa	Louisiana–Monroe
TE	Isaiah Likely	Coastal Carolina
WR	Thomas Hennigan	Appalachian State
WR	Cornelius McCoy	Georgia State
WR	Reggie Todd	Troy
Second Team Defense
DL	Forrest Merrill	Arkansas State
DL	C. J. Brewer	Coastal Carolina
DL	Dontae Wilson	Georgia State
DL	Zi'Yon Hill	Louisiana
LB	Teddy Gallagher	Coastal Carolina
LB	Trajan Stephens-McQueen	Georgia State
LB	Riley Cole	South Alabama
DB	Shemar Jean-Charles	Appalachian State
DB	Antonio Fletcher	Arkansas State
DB	Quavian White	Georgia State
DB	Eric Garror	Louisiana
Second Team Special Teams
K	Massimo Biscardi	Coastal Carolina
P	Anthony Beck II	Georgia Southern
RS	Eric Garror	Louisiana

== Head coaches ==
Appalachian State was the only team to undergo a coaching change from last season; Eliah Drinkwitz departed the program after the conclusion of the regular season to become the head coach at Missouri. Shawn Clark was named interim coach upon his departure, and the interim tag was removed in time for him to coach the Mountaineers to a victory in the 2019 New Orleans Bowl.

Team	Head coach	Years at school	Overall record	Record at school	Sun Belt record
Appalachian State	Shawn Clark	1	0–1	0–1	0–0
Arkansas State	Blake Anderson	7	51–34	51–34	40–12
Coastal Carolina	Jamey Chadwell	2	71–55	11–18	4–15
Georgia Southern	Chad Lunsford	4	24–16	24–16	21–11
Georgia State	Shawn Elliott	4	23–29	22–23	13–15
Louisiana	Billy Napier	3	23–12	23–12	14–5
Louisiana–Monroe	Matt Viator	5	100–66	22–33	17–18
South Alabama	Steve Campbell	3	66–49	6–26	4–20
Texas State	Jake Spavital	2	5–14	5–14	3–9
Troy	Chip Lindsey	2	8–11	8–11	4–7

== Rankings ==
		Pre	Wk 2	Wk 3	Wk 4	Wk 5	Wk 6	Wk 7	Wk 8	Wk 9	Wk 10	Wk 11	Wk 12	Wk 13	Wk 14	Wk 15	Wk 16	Final
Appalachian State	AP	RV	т23	RV					RV	RV	RV	RV				RV		RV
Appalachian State	C	RV	23	RV					RV	RV	RV	RV	RV	RV	RV			RV
Appalachian State	CFP	Not released																
Arkansas State	AP		RV	RV	RV													
Arkansas State	C		RV	RV	RV													
Arkansas State	CFP	Not released																
Coastal Carolina	AP			RV		RV	RV	25	20	15	15	15	16	14	11	9	9	14
Coastal Carolina	C		RV	RV	RV	RV	RV	25	21	16	17	18	17	14	13	12	11	14
Coastal Carolina	CFP	Not released											20	18	13	12	12	
Georgia Southern	AP																	
Georgia Southern	C																	
Georgia Southern	CFP	Not released																
Georgia State	AP																	
Georgia State	C																	
Georgia State	CFP	Not released																
Louisiana	AP		19	19	RV	23	21	RV	RV	RV	25	24	23	20	17	17	16	15
Louisiana	C	RV	21	25	RV	23	21	RV	RV	RV	RV	25	24	21	17	18	17	16
Louisiana	CFP	Not released												25	19	19	19	
Louisiana–Monroe	AP																	
Louisiana–Monroe	C																	
Louisiana–Monroe	CFP	Not released																
South Alabama	AP																	
South Alabama	C																	
South Alabama	CFP	Not released																
Texas State	AP																	
Texas State	C																	
Texas State	CFP	Not released																
Troy	AP																	
Troy	C																	
Troy	CFP	Not released																

Legend
	Improvement in ranking
	Drop in ranking
	Not ranked previous week
	No change in ranking from previous week
RV	Received votes but were not ranked in Top 25 of poll
т	Tied with team above or below also with this symbol

== Schedule ==
=== Regular season ===
Index to colors and formatting
Sun Belt Member won
Sun Belt Member lost
Sun Belt teams in **bold**

==== Week One ====
Date	Time	Visiting team	Home team	Site	TV	Result	Attendance	Ref.
September 3	8:00 p.m.	**South Alabama**	Southern Miss	M. M. Roberts Stadium • Hattiesburg, MS	CBSSN	**W** 32–21		
September 5	3:30 p.m.	SMU	**Texas State**	Bobcat Stadium • San Marcos, TX	ESPN	**L** 24–31	7,500	
September 5	7:00 p.m.	**Arkansas State**	Memphis	Liberty Bowl Memorial Stadium • Memphis, TN	ESPN	**L** 24–37	4,537	
^{#}Rankings from AP Poll released prior to game. All times are in Central Time.

==== Week Two ====
Date	Time	Visiting team	Home team	Site	TV	Result	Attendance	Ref.
September 12	11:00 a.m.	**Louisiana**	No. 23 Iowa State	Jack Trice Stadium • Ames, IA	ESPN	**W** 31–14		
September 12	11:00 a.m.	**Arkansas State**	Kansas State	Bill Snyder Family Stadium • Manhattan, KS	Fox	**W** 35–31		
September 12	11:00 a.m.	Charlotte	**Appalachian State**	Kidd Brewer Stadium • Boone, NC	ESPN2	**W** 35–20		
September 12	12:30 p.m.	**Louisiana–Monroe**	Army	Michie Stadium • West Point, NY	CBSSN	**L** 7–37		
September 12	2:30 p.m.	UTSA	**Texas State**	Bobcat Stadium • San Marcos, TX	ESPN2	**L** 48–51 ^{2OT}		
September 12	2:30 p.m.	Campbell	**Georgia Southern**	Paulson Stadium • Statesboro, GA	ESPNU	**W** 27-26		
September 12	6:30 p.m.	Tulane	**South Alabama**	Hancock Whitney Stadium • Mobile, AL	ESPN2	**L** 24–27		
September 12	9:00 p.m.	**Coastal Carolina**	Kansas	David Booth Kansas Memorial Stadium • Lawrence, KS	FS1	**W** 38–23		
^{#}Rankings from AP Poll released prior to game. All times are in Central Time.

==== Week Three ====
Date	Time	Visiting team	Home team	Site	TV	Result	Attendance	Ref.
September 18	6:00 p.m.	Campbell	**Coastal Carolina**	Brooks Stadium • Conway, SC	ESPN3	**W** 43–21	5,000	
September 19	11:00 a.m.	**No. 19 Louisiana**	**Georgia State**	Center Parc Stadium • Atlanta, GA	ESPN2	**ULL** 34–31 ^{OT}	4,126	
September 19	12:30 p.m.	**No. 23 Appalachian State**	Marshall	Joan C. Edwards Stadium • Huntington, WV	CBSSN	**L** 7–17	12,050	
September 19	3:00 p.m.	Florida Atlantic	**Georgia Southern**	Paulson Stadium • Statesboro, GA	ESPN2	postponed		
September 19	3:00 p.m.	**Troy**	Middle Tennessee	Johnny "Red" Floyd Stadium • Murfreesboro, TN	ESPNU	**W** 47–14	6,000	
September 19	6:00 p.m.	Central Arkansas	**Arkansas State**	Centennial Bank Stadium • Jonesboro, AR	ESPN+	postponed		
September 19	6:30 p.m.	**Texas State**	**Louisiana–Monroe**	Malone Stadium • Monroe, LA	ESPNU	**TXST** 38–17	5,816	
^{#}Rankings from AP Poll released prior to game. All times are in Central Time.

==== Week Four ====
Date	Time	Visiting team	Home team	Site	TV	Result	Attendance	Ref.
September 24	6:30 p.m.	UAB	**South Alabama**	Hancock Whitney Stadium • Mobile, AL	ESPN	**L** 10–42	5,766	
September 26	11:00 a.m.	**Georgia Southern**	**No. 19 Louisiana**	Cajun Field • Lafayette, LA	ESPN2	**ULL** 20–18	5,585	
September 26	11:00 a.m.	Campbell	**Appalachian State**	Kidd Brewer Stadium • Boone, NC	ESPN+	**W** 52–21	0	
September 26	11:00 a.m.	**Georgia State**	Charlotte	Jerry Richardson Stadium • Charlotte, NC		postponed	-	
September 26	2:30 p.m.	Tulsa	**Arkansas State**	Centennial Bank Stadium • Jonesboro, AR		postponed	-	
September 26	5:00 p.m.	**Texas State**	Boston College	Alumni Stadium • Chestnut Hill, MA	ESPN3	**L** 21–24	0	
September 26	2:30 p.m.	UTEP	**Louisiana–Monroe**	Malone Stadium • Monroe, LA	ESPN2	**L** 6–31	5,491	
September 26	9:15 p.m.	**Troy**	No. 18 BYU	LaVell Edwards Stadium • Provo, UT	ESPN	**L** 7–48	0	
^{#}Rankings from AP Poll released prior to game. All times are in Central Time.

==== Week Five ====
Date	Time	Visiting team	Home team	Site	TV	Result	Attendance	Ref.
October 3	11:00 a.m.	East Carolina	**Georgia State**	Center Parc Stadium • Atlanta, GA	ESPNU	**W** 49–29	3,823	
October 3	11:00 a.m.	**Arkansas State**	**Costal Carolina**	Brooks Stadium • Conway, SC	ESPN2	**CCU** 52–23	5,000	
October 3	6:00 p.m.	**Georgia Southern**	**Louisiana–Monroe**	Malone Stadium • Monroe, LA	ESPN+	**GASO** 35–30	6,338	
October 3	7:00 p.m.	**Troy**	**South Alabama**	Hancock Whitney Stadium • Mobile, AL		postponed	-	
^{#}Rankings from AP Poll released prior to game. All times are in Central Time.

==== Week Six ====
Date	Time	Visiting team	Home team	Site	TV	Result	Attendance	Ref.
October 10	11:00 a.m.	**Louisiana–Monroe**	Liberty	Williams Stadium • Lynchburg, VA	ESPN2	**L** 7–40	1,000	
October 10	2:30 p.m.	**Texas State**	**Troy**	Veterans Memorial Stadium • Troy, AL	ESPN3	**TROY** 37–17	10,500	
October 10	2:30 p.m.	Central Arkansas	**Arkansas State**	Centennial Bank Stadium • Jonesboro, AR	ESPN3	**W** 50–27	4,561	
^{#}Rankings from AP Poll released prior to game. All times are in Central Time.

==== Week Seven ====
Date	Time	Visiting team	Home team	Site	TV	Result	Attendance	Ref.
October 14	6:30 p.m.	**Costal Carolina**	**No. 21 Louisiana**	Cajun Field • Lafayette, LA	ESPN	**CCU** 30–27	5,585	
October 15	6:30 p.m.	**Georgia State**	**Arkansas State**	Centennial Bank Stadium • Jonesboro, AR	ESPN	**ARKST** 59–52	5,496	
October 17	11:00 a.m.	**Texas State**	**South Alabama**	Hancock Whitney Stadium • Mobile, AL	ESPNU	**SOAL** 30–20	5,142	
October 17	2:30 p.m.	Eastern Kentucky	**Troy**	Veterans Memorial Stadium • Troy, AL	ESPN3	**W** 31–29	10,500	
October 17	3:00 p.m.	UMass	**Georgia Southern**	Allen E. Paulson Stadium • Statesboro, GA	ESPN2	**W** 41–0	4,856	
^{#}Rankings from AP Poll released prior to game. All times are in Central Time.

==== Week Eight ====
Date	Time	Visiting team	Home team	Site	TV	Result	Attendance	Ref.
October 22	6:30 p.m.	Arkansas State	**Appalachian State**	Kidd Brewer Stadium • Boone, NC	ESPN	**APPST** 45–17	2,100	
October 23	7:00 p.m.	Louisiana	UAB	Legion Field • Birmingham, AL	CBSSN	**W** 24–20	11,610	
October 24	11:00 a.m.	Georgia Southern	**No. 25 Coastal Carolina**	Brooks Stadium • Conway, SC	ESPNU	**CCU** 28–14	5,000	
October 24	3:00 p.m.	Georgia State	**Troy**	Veterans Memorial Stadium • Troy, AL	ESPNU	**GSU** 36–34	12,000	
October 24	6:00 p.m.	Louisiana–Monroe	**South Alabama**	Hancock Whitney Stadium • Mobile, AL	ESPN+	**SOAL** 38–14	5,186	
October 24	9:15 p.m.	Texas State	No. 12 BYU	LaVell Edwards Stadium • Provo, UT	ESPN	**L** 14–52	6,570	
^{#}Rankings from AP Poll released prior to game. All times are in Central Time.

==== Week Nine ====
Date	Time	Visiting team	Home team	Site	TV	Result	Attendance	Ref.
October 29	6:30 p.m.	**South Alabama**	**Georgia Southern**	Allen E. Paulson Stadium • Statesboro, GA	ESPN	**GASO** 24–17	3,457	
October 31	11:00 a.m.	**No. 20 Coastal Carolina**	**Georgia State**	Center Parc Stadium • Atlanta, GA	ESPNU	**CCU** 51–0	3,642	
October 31	2:00 p.m.	**Troy**	**Arkansas State**	Centennial Bank Stadium • Jonesboro, AR	ESPN3	**TROY** 38–10	6,757	
October 31	3:00 p.m.	**Appalachian State**	**Louisiana–Monroe**	Malone Stadium • Monroe, LA	ESPNU	**APPST** 31–13	5,493	
October 31	7:00 p.m.	**Louisiana**	**Texas State**	Bobcat Stadium • San Marcos, TX	ESPNU	**ULL** 44–34	7,500	
^{#}Rankings from AP Poll released prior to game. All times are in Central Time.

==== Week Ten ====
Date	Time	Visiting team	Home team	Site	TV	Result	Attendance	Ref.
November 7	11:00 a.m.	**Louisiana–Monroe**	**Georgia State**	Center Parc Stadium • Atlanta, GA	ESPN3	**GSU** 52–34	2,921	
November 7	11:00 a.m.	**Arkansas State**	**Louisiana**	Cajun Field • Lafayette, LA	ESPNU	**ULL** 27–20	5,585	
November 7	12:00 p.m.	**Troy**	**Georgia Southern**	Allen E. Paulson Stadium • Statesboro, GA	ESPN3	**GASO** 20–13	5,012	
November 7	2:00 p.m.	**Appalachian State**	**Texas State**	Bobcat Stadium • San Marcos, TX	ESPN+	**APPST** 38–17	6,745	
November 7	7:00 p.m.	**South Alabama**	**No. 15 Coastal Carolina**	Brooks Stadium • Conway, SC	ESPNU	**CCU** 23–6	5,000	
^{#}Rankings from AP Poll released prior to game. All times are in Central Time.

==== Week Eleven ====
Date	Time	Visiting team	Home team	Site	TV	Result	Attendance	Ref.
November 14	11:00 a.m.	**No. 15 Coastal Carolina**	**Troy**	Veterans Memorial Stadium • Troy, AL		postponed	-	
November 14	1:00 p.m.	**South Alabama**	**No. 25 Louisiana**	Cajun Field • Lafayette, LA	ESPN+	**ULL** 38–10	5,585	
November 14	1:30 p.m.	**Georgia State**	**Appalachian State**	Kidd Brewer Stadium • Boone, NC	ESPN+	**APPST** 17–13	2,100	
November 14	2:00 p.m.	**Louisiana–Monroe**	**Arkansas State**	Centennial Bank Stadium • Jonesboro, AR		postponed	-	
November 14	2:30 p.m.	**Texas State**	**Georgia Southern**	Allen E. Paulson Stadium • Statesboro, GA	ESPN3	**GASO** 40–38	4,478	
^{#}Rankings from AP Poll released prior to game. All times are in Central Time.

==== Week Twelve ====
Date	Time	Visiting team	Home team	Site	TV	Result	Attendance	Ref.
November 21	11:00 a.m.	**Appalachian State**	**No. 15 Coastal Carolina**	Brooks Stadium • Conway, SC	ESPN	**CCU** 34–23	5,000	
November 21	11:00 a.m.	**Arkansas State**	**Texas State**	Bobcat Stadium • San Marcos, TX	ESPN2	**TXST** 47–45	5,218	
November 21	11:00 a.m.	**Georgia Southern**	Army	Michie Stadium • West Point, NY	CBSSN	**L** 27–28	5,181	
November 21	1:00 p.m.	Central Arkansas	**No. 24 Louisiana**	Cajun Field • Lafayette, LA		cancelled	-	
November 21	2:30 p.m.	**Georgia State**	**South Alabama**	Hancock Whitney Stadium • Mobile, AL	ESPNU	**GSU** 31–14	5,224	
November 21	2:30 p.m.	Middle Tennessee	**Troy**	Veterans Memorial Stadium • Troy, AL	ESPN3	**L** 17–20	12,000	
November 21	3:00 p.m.	**Louisiana–Monroe**	Louisiana Tech	Independence Stadium • Shreveport, LA		cancelled	-	
^{#}Rankings from AP Poll released prior to game. All times are in Central Time.

==== Week Thirteen ====
Date	Time	Visiting team	Home team	Site	TV	Result	Attendance	Ref.
November 28	11:00 a.m.	**Georgia Southern**	**Georgia State**	Center Parc Stadium • Atlanta, GA (Modern Day Hate)	ESPN3	**GSU** 30–24	4,523	
November 28	2:00 p.m.	**No. 23 Louisiana**	**Louisiana–Monroe**	Malone Stadium • Monroe, LA (Battle on the Bayou)	ESPN3	**ULL** 70–20	3,132	
November 28	2:00 p.m.	**South Alabama**	**Arkansas State**	Centennial Bank Stadium • Jonesboro, AR	ESPN3	**SOAL** 38–31	4,013	
November 28	2:00 p.m.	**No. 16 Coastal Carolina**	**Texas State**	Bobcat Stadium • San Marcos, TX	ESPN+	**CCU** 49–14	3,245	
November 28	2:30 p.m.	**Troy**	**Appalachian State**	Kidd Brewer Stadium • Boone, NC	ESPN2	**APPST** 47–10	2,100	
^{#}Rankings from AP Poll released prior to game. All times are in Central Time.

==== Week Fourteen ====
Date	Time	Visiting team	Home team	Site	TV	Result	Attendance	Ref.
December 4	7:30 p.m.	**No. 20 Louisiana**	**Appalachian State**	Kidd Brewer Stadium • Boone, NC	ESPN	**ULL** 24–21	2,170	
December 5	1:00 p.m.	**Troy**	**South Alabama**	Hancock Whitney Stadium • Mobile, AL (Battle for the Belt)	ESPN3	**TROY** 29–0	5,375	
December 5	2:00 p.m.	**Louisiana–Monroe**	**Arkansas State**	Centennial Bank Stadium • Jonesboro, AR	ESPN3	**ARKST** 48–15	3,268	
December 5	4:30 p.m.	No. 8 BYU	**No. 14 Coastal Carolina**	Brooks Stadium • Conway, SC	ESPNU	**W** 22–17	5,000	
December 5	5:00 p.m.	Florida Atlantic	**Georgia Southern**	Allen E. Paulson Stadium • Statesboro, GA	ESPN+	**W** 20–3	-	
^{#}Rankings from AP Poll released prior to game. All times are in Central Time.

==== Week Fifteen ====
Date	Time	Visiting team	Home team	Site	TV	Result	Attendance	Ref.
December 12	2:00 p.m.	**#11 Coastal Carolina**	**Troy**	Veterans Memorial Stadium • Troy, AL	ESPN+	**CCU** 42–38	11,000	
December 12	2:00 p.m.	Incarnate Word	**Arkansas State**	Centennial Bank Stadium • Jonesboro, AR	ESPN3	cancelled	n/a	
December 12	5:00 p.m.	**Appalachian State**	**Georgia Southern**	Allen E. Paulson Stadium • Statesboro, GA (rivalry)	ESPN3	**APPST** 34–26		
^{#}Rankings from AP Poll released prior to game. All times are in Central Time.

==== Week Sixteen ====
Date	Time	Visiting team	Home team	Site	TV	Result	Attendance	Ref.
December 19	6:00 p.m.	**Louisiana–Monroe**	**Troy**	Veterans Memorial Stadium • Troy, AL	ESPN3	cancelled	n/a	
^{#}Rankings from AP Poll released prior to game. All times are in Central Time.

==== Championship Game ====
Date	Time	Visiting team	Home team	Site	TV	Result	Attendance	Ref.
December 19	2:30 p.m.	**Louisiana**	**Coastal Carolina**	Brooks Stadium • Conway, SC	ESPN	cancelled	n/a	
^{#}Rankings from AP Poll released prior to game. All times are in Central Time.

== Postseason ==
=== Bowl Games ===
Legend
Sun Belt win
Sun Belt loss

Bowl game	Date	Site	Television	Time (CST)	Sun Belt team	Opponent	Score	Attendance
Myrtle Beach Bowl	December 21	Brooks Stadium • Conway, SC	ESPN	1:30 p.m.	Appalachian State	North Texas	W 56–28	5,000
New Orleans Bowl	December 23	Mercedes-Benz Superdome • New Orleans, LA	ESPN	2:00 p.m.	Georgia Southern	Louisiana Tech	W 38–3	3,000
First Responder Bowl	December 26	Gerald J. Ford Stadium • University Park, TX	ABC	2:30 p.m.	No. 16 Louisiana	UTSA	W 31–24	3,512
LendingTree Bowl	December 26	Ladd–Peebles Stadium • Mobile, AL	ESPN	2:30 p.m.	Georgia State	Western Kentucky	W 39–21	5,128
Cure Bowl	December 26	Camping World Stadium • Orlando, FL	ESPN	6:30 p.m.	No. 9 Coastal Carolina	No. 23 Liberty	L 34–37 ^{OT}	4,488

== Sun Belt records vs. other conferences ==
2020–2021 records against non-conference foes:

Regular season

Power 5 Conferences	Record
ACC	0–1
Big Ten	0–0
Big 12	3–0
BYU/Notre Dame	1–2
Pac-12	0–0
SEC	0–0
Power 5 Total	4–3
Other FBS Conferences	Record
American	1–3
C-USA	5–5
Independents (Excluding BYU and Notre Dame)	1–3
MAC	0–0
Mountain West	0–0
Other FBS Total	7–11
FCS Opponents	Record
Football Championship Subdivision	5-0
Total Non-Conference Record	16–14

=== Sun Belt vs Power Five matchups ===
This is a list of games the Sun Belt has scheduled versus power conference teams (ACC, Big 10, Big 12, Pac-12, BYU/Notre Dame and SEC). All rankings are from the current AP Poll at the time of the game.

Date	Conference	Visitor	Home	Site	Score
September 12	Big 12	Louisiana	No. 23 Iowa State	Jack Trice Stadium • Ames, IA	W, 31–14
September 12	Big 12	Arkansas State	Kansas State	Bill Snyder Family Stadium • Manhattan, KS	W, 35–31
September 12	Big 12	Coastal Carolina	Kansas	David Booth Kansas Memorial Stadium • Lawrence, KS	W, 38–23
September 26	ACC	Texas State	Boston College	Alumni Stadium • Chestnut Hill, MA	L, 21–24
September 26	Independent	Troy	No. 18 BYU	LaVell Edwards Stadium • Provo, UT	L, 7–48
October 24	Independent	Texas State	No. 12 BYU	LaVell Edwards Stadium • Provo, UT	L, 14–52
December 5	Independent	No. 8 BYU	No. 14 Coastal Carolina	Brooks Stadium • Conway, SC	W, 22–17

=== Sun Belt vs Group of Five matchups ===
The following games include Sun Belt teams competing against teams from the American, C-USA, MAC or Mountain West.

Date	Conference	Visitor	Home	Site	Score
September 3	C-USA	South Alabama	Southern Miss	M. M. Roberts Stadium • Hattiesburg, MS	W, 32–21
September 5	American	SMU	Texas State	Bobcat Stadium • San Marcos, TX	L, 24–31
September 5	American	Arkansas State	Memphis	Liberty Bowl Memorial Stadium • Memphis, TN	L, 24–37
September 12	C-USA	Charlotte	Appalachian State	Kidd Brewer Stadium • Boone, NC	W, 35–20
September 12	C-USA	UTSA	Texas State	Bobcat Stadium • San Marcos, TX	L, 48–51^{2OT}
September 12	American	Tulane	South Alabama	Hancock Whitney Stadium • Mobile, AL	L, 24–27
September 19	C-USA	No. 23 Appalachian State	Marshall	Joan C. Edwards Stadium • Huntington, WV	L, 7–17
September 19	C-USA	Troy	Middle Tennessee	Johnny "Red" Floyd Stadium • Murfreesboro, TN	W, 47–14
September 24	C-USA	UAB	South Alabama	Hancock Whitney Stadium • Mobile, AL	L, 10–42
September 26	C-USA	UTEP	Louisiana–Monroe	Malone Stadium • Monroe, LA	L, 6–31
October 3	American	East Carolina	Georgia State	Center Parc Stadium • Atlanta, GA	W, 49–29
October 23	C-USA	Louisiana	UAB	Legion Field • Birmingham, AL	W, 24–20
November 21	C-USA	Middle Tennessee	Troy	Veterans Memorial Stadium • Troy, AL	L 17–20
December 5	C-USA	Florida Atlantic	Georgia Southern	Allen E. Paulson Stadium • Statesboro, GA	W, 20–3

=== Sun Belt vs FBS independents matchups ===
The following games include Sun Belt teams competing against FBS Independents, which includes Army, Liberty, New Mexico State, UConn, or UMass.

Date	Conference	Visitor	Home	Site	Score
September 12	Independents	Louisiana–Monroe	Army	Michie Stadium • West Point, NY	L, 7–37
October 10	Independents	Louisiana–Monroe	Liberty	Williams Stadium • Lynchburg, VA	L, 7–40
October 17	Independents	UMass	Georgia Southern	Allen E. Paulson Stadium • Statesboro, GA	W, 41–0
November 21	Independents	Georgia Southern	Army	Michie Stadium • West Point, NY	L, 27–28

=== Sun Belt vs FCS matchups ===
Date	Visitor	Home	Site	Score
September 12	Campbell	Georgia Southern	Allen E. Paulson Stadium • Statesboro, GA	W, 26–27
September 18	Campbell	Coastal Carolina	Brooks Stadium • Conway, SC	W, 43–21
September 26	Campbell	Appalachian State	Kidd Brewer Stadium • Boone, NC	W, 52–21
October 10	Central Arkansas	Arkansas State	Centennial Bank Stadium • Jonesboro, AR	W, 50–27
October 17	Eastern Kentucky	Troy	Veterans Memorial Stadium • Troy, AL	W, 31–29

== Awards and honors ==
=== Players of the week ===
Week	Offensive			Defensive			Special Teams		
Week	Player	Team	Position	Player	Team	Position	Player	Team	Position
Week 1	Jalen Tolbert	South Alabama	WR	Nick Mobley	South Alabama	LB	Blake Grupe	Arkansas State	K
Week 2	Jonathan Adams Jr.	Arkansas State	WR	Ferrod Gardner	Louisiana	LB	Chris Smith	Louisiana	KR
Week 3	Elijah Mitchell	Louisiana	RB	Silas Kelly	Coastal Carolina	LB	Rhys Byrns	Louisiana	P
Week 4	Daetrich Harrington	Appalachian State	RB	Lorenzo McCaskill	Louisiana	LB	Nate Snyder	Louisiana	K
Week 5	Grayson McCall	Coastal Carolina	QB	Antavaious Lane	Georgia State	S	NaJee Thompson	Georgia Southern	WR
Week 6	Gunnar Watson	Troy	QB	Justin Rice	Arkansas State	LB	Ryan Hanson	Arkansas State	P
Week 7	Jonathan Adams Jr.	Arkansas State	WR	Riley Cole	South Alabama	LB	Massimo Biscardi	Coastal Carolina	K
Week 8	Kawaan Baker; Zac Thomas	South Alabama; Appalachian State	WR; QB	Jordan Strachan	Georgia State	LB	Chris Smith	Louisiana	KR
Week 9	Grayson McCall	Coastal Carolina	QB	Tarron Jackson	Coastal Carolina	DE	Seth Keller	Texas State	K
Week 10	Cornelious Brown IV	Georgia State	QB	Tarron Jackson	Coastal Carolina	DE	Jack Martin	Troy	P
Week 11	Levi Lewis	Louisiana	QB	D'Marco Jackson	Appalachian State	LB	Jeremiah Haydel	Texas State	KR
Week 12	Brady McBride	Texas State	QB	C. J. Brewer	Coastal Carolina	DT	Chandler Staton	Appalachian State	K
Week 13	Jalen Tolbert	South Alabama	WR	Tarron Jackson	Coastal Carolina	DE	Noel Ruiz	Georgia State	P
Week 14	Corey Rucker	Arkansas State	WR	Jeffrey Gunter	Coastal Carolina	BE	Khaleb Hood	Georgia Southern	PR
Week 15	Grayson McCall	Coastal Carolina	QB	Carlton Martial	Troy	LB	Jalen Virgil	Appalachian State	KR

=== Sun Belt individual awards ===
The following individuals received postseason honors as voted by the Sun Belt Conference football coaches at the end of the season

Award	Player	School
Player of the Year	Grayson McCall	Coastal Carolina
Offensive Player of the Year	Jonathan Adams	Arkansas State
Defensive Player of the Year	Tarron Jackson	Coastal Carolina
Freshman Player of the Year	Grayson McCall	Coastal Carolina
Newcomer of the Year	D'Jordan Strong	Coastal Carolina
Coach of the Year	Jamey Chadwell	Coastal Carolina

=== All-conference teams ===
Position	Player	Team
First Team Offense
WR	Jonathan Adams	Arkansas State
WR	Jaivon Heiligh	Coastal Carolina
WR	Jalen Tolbert	South Alabama
OL	Noah Hannon	Appalachian State
OL	Trey Carter	Coastal Carolina
OL	Shamarious Gilmore	Georgia State
OL	Austin Stidham	Troy
OL	Baer Hunter	Appalachian State
TE	Isaiah Likely	Coastal Carolina
QB	Grayson McCall	Coastal Carolina
RB	C. J. Marable	Coastal Carolina
RB	Elijah Mitchell	Louisiana
First Team Defense
DL	Tarron Jackson	Coastal Carolina
DL	Demetrius Taylor	Appalachian State
DL	Raymond Johnson	Georgia Southern
DL	C. J. Brewer	Coastal Carolina
DL	Jeffrey Gunter	Coastal Carolina
LB	Carlton Martial	Troy
LB	Justin Rice	Arkansas State
LB	Riley Cole	South Alabama
DB	D'Jordan Strong	Coastal Carolina
DB	Shemar Jean-Charles	Appalachian State
DB	Shaun Jolly	Appalachian State
DB	Derrick Canteen	Georgia Southern
First Team Specialists
K	Noel Ruiz	Georgia State
P	Jack Martin	Troy
AP	C. J. Marable	Coastal Carolina
KRS	Chris Smith	Louisiana

Position	Player	Team
Second Team Offense
WR	Kawaan Baker	South Alabama
WR	Kaylon Geiger	Troy
WR	Sam Pinckney	Georgia State
OL	O'Cyrus Torrence	Louisiana
OL	Cooper Hodges	Appalachian State
OL	Dylan Bradshaw	Troy
OL	Willie Lampkin	Coastal Carolina
OL	Max Mitchell	Louisiana
TE	Josh Pederson	Louisiana–Monroe
QB	Levi Lewis	Louisiana
RB	Trey Ragas	Louisiana
RB	Camerun Peoples	Appalachian State
Second Team Defense
DL	Will Choloh	Troy
DL	Zi'Yon Hill	Louisiana
DL	Forrest Merrill	Arkansas State
DL	Hardrick Willis	Georgia State
LB	Silas Kelly	Coastal Carolina
LB	Rashad Byrd	Georgia Southern
LB	D'Marco Jackson	Appalachian State
DB	Bralen Trahan	Louisiana
DB	Quavian White	Georgia State
DB	Terence Dunlap	Troy
DB	Jarron Morris	Texas State
DB	Antavious Lane	Georgia State
Second Team Specialists
K	Massimo Biscardi	Coastal Carolina
P	Rhys Byrns	Louisiana
AP	Jeremiah Haydel	Texas State
KRS	Jeremiah Haydel	Texas State

Position	Player	Team
Third Team Offense
WR	Thomas Hennigan	Appalachian State
WR	Marcell Barbee	Texas State
WR	Malik Williams	Appalachian State
OL	Ken Marks	Louisiana
OL	Ryan Neuzil	Appalachian State
OL	Aaron Dowdell	Georgia Southern
OL	Sam Thompson	Coastal Carolina
OL	Shane Vallot	Louisiana
TE	Roger Carter	Georgia State
QB	Zac Thomas	Appalachian State
RB	Destin Coates	Georgia State
RB	Daetrich Harrington	Appalachian State
Third Team Defense
DL	Nico Ezidore	Texas State
DL	Richard Jibunor	Troy
DL	Dontae Wilson	Georgia State
DL	Jeremiah Littles	South Alabama
LB	Jordan Stachan	Georgia State
LB	Lorenzo McCaskill	Louisiana
LB	Teddy Gallagher	Coastal Carolina
DB	Keith Gallmon	South Alabama
DB	Eric Garror	Louisiana
DB	Alex Spillum	Coastal Carolina
DB	Kaiden Smith	Appalachian State
DB	Dell Pettus	Troy
Third Team Specialists
K	Diego Guajardo	South Alabama
P	Anthony Beck	Georgia Southern
AP	Chris Smith	Louisiana
KRS	Jalen Virgil	Appalachian State

Ref:

=== All-Americans ===
The 2020 College Football All-America Teams are composed of the following College Football All-American first teams chosen by the following selector organizations: Associated Press (AP), Football Writers Association of America (FWAA), American Football Coaches Association (AFCA), Walter Camp Foundation (WCFF), The Sporting News (TSN), Sports Illustrated (SI), USA Today (USAT) ESPN, CBS Sports (CBS), FOX Sports (FOX) College Football News (CFN), Bleacher Report (BR), Scout.com, Phil Steele (PS), SB Nation (SB), Athlon Sports, Pro Football Focus (PFF) and Yahoo! Sports (Yahoo!).

Currently, the NCAA compiles consensus all-America teams in the sports of Division I-FBS football and Division I men's basketball using a point system computed from All-America teams named by coaches associations or media sources. The system consists of three points for a first-team honor, two points for second-team honor, and one point for third-team honor. Honorable mention and fourth team or lower recognitions are not accorded any points. Football consensus teams are compiled by position and the player accumulating the most points at each position is named first team consensus all-American. Currently, the NCAA recognizes All-Americans selected by the AP, AFCA, FWAA, TSN, and the WCFF to determine Consensus and Unanimous All-Americans. Any player named to the First Team by all five of the NCAA-recognized selectors is deemed a Unanimous All-American.

Position	Player	School	Selector	Unanimous	Consensus
First Team All-Americans
DE	Tarron Jackson	Coastal Carolina	AFCA, AP, Athletic, ESPN, FWAA		*
RS	Jeremiah Haydel	Texas State	ESPN		
RS	Chris Smith	Louisiana	CBS		

Position	Player	School	Selector	Unanimous	Consensus
Second Team All-Americans
WR	Jonathan Adams Jr.	Arkansas State	AP, CBS, FWAA, TSN, USAT		
G	Ryan Neuzil	Appalachian State	TSN		
DE	Tarron Jackson	Coastal Carolina	CBS, TSN, USAT		
LB	Justin Rice	Arkansas State	USAT		
CB	Shemar Jean-Charles	Appalachian State	TSN		
PR	Jeremiah Haydel	Texas State	FWAA, USAT		
KR	Chris Smith	Louisiana	FWAA		

Position	Player	School	Selector	Unanimous	Consensus
Third Team All-Americans
DT	C. J. Brewer	Coastal Carolina	AP		

== NFL draft ==
The following list includes all Sun Belt Players who were drafted in the 2021 NFL draft

Player	Position	School	Draft Round	Round Pick	Overall Pick	Team
Shemar Jean-Charles	CB	Appalachian State	5	34	178	Green Bay Packers
Tarron Jackson	DE	Coastal Carolina	6	7	191	Philadelphia Eagles
Elijah Mitchell	RB	Louisiana	6	10	194	San Francisco 49ers
Kawaan Baker	WR	South Alabama	7	28	255	New Orleans Saints
