= Chris Smith (running back, born 1999) =

American gridiron football player (born 1999)

Profile
- Position: Running back

Personal information
- Born: September 8, 1999 (age 27); Meridian, Mississippi, U.S.
- Listed height: 5 ft 9 in (1.75 m)
- Listed weight: 194 lb (88 kg)

Career information
- High school: Nanih Waiya (Louisville, Mississippi)
- College: Louisiana (2018–2022)
- NFL draft: 2023: undrafted

Career history
- Seattle Seahawks (2023)*; San Antonio Brahmas (2024)*; Winnipeg Blue Bombers (2024); Hamilton Tiger-Cats (2025)*
- * Offseason or practice squad member only

Awards and highlights
- All-American (2020); 2× First-team All-Sun Belt (2020, 2021)
- Stats at CFL.ca

Chris Smith (born September 8, 1999) is an American professional football running back. He played college football at Louisiana.

== Early life ==
Smith was born on September 8, 1999, in Meridian, Mississippi. He attended Nanih Waiya High School, being named the 2016 "Mr. Football".

== College career ==
=== 2018–2019 ===
Smith committed to the University of Louisiana at Lafayette, spending his first year as a redshirt and appearing in four games. As a redshirt freshman in 2019, Smith appeared in every game of the season and placed fourth on the roster with 334 rushing yards. He ran for four touchdowns on the year.

=== 2020–2021 ===
In 2020, Smith appeared in all 11 games for the school and served as their return specialist and third running back. As a returner, Smith made 23 kick returns for 617 yards and two touchdowns, and twice earned conference special teams player of the week honors. He finished the season with 1,137 all-purpose yards, 30th most in the nation. Following the season, he was named a first-team All-America selection by CBS and 247Sports.com.

In 2021, Smith earned the starting running back role and led the team with 855 rushing yards on the year. In a 28–27 win over Arkansas State, he ran for a career-high 238 yards and two touchdowns.

== Professional career ==
Pre-draft measurables
| Height | Weight | Arm length | Hand span | Wingspan | 40-yard dash | 10-yard split | 20-yard split | 20-yard shuttle | Three-cone drill | Vertical jump | Broad jump | Bench press |
|---|---|---|---|---|---|---|---|---|---|---|---|---|
| 5 ft 8 5/8 in (1.74 m) | 194 lb (88 kg) | 30 3/8 in (0.77 m) | 8 7/8 in (0.23 m) | 6 ft 0 3/8 in (1.84 m) | 4.49 s | 1.40 s | 2.51 s | 4.44 s | 7.20 s | 36.0 in (0.91 m) | 9 ft 10 in (3.00 m) | 12 reps |
All values from Pro Day

=== Seattle Seahawks ===
Smith signed with the Seattle Seahawks on May 12, 2023 as an undrafted free agent. He was waived on June 1, 2023.

=== San Antonio Brahmas ===
On June 16, 2023, Smith was selected by the San Antonio Brahmas as part of the XFL Rookie Draft. He was signed on October 24, 2023.

=== Winnipeg Blue Bombers ===
On February 5, 2024, it was announced that Smith signed with the Winnipeg Blue Bombers of the Canadian Football League (CFL). He played in four regular season games where he had 13 punt returns for 141 yards and four kickoff returns for 247 yards. He finished the season on the practice roster where his contract expired on November 18, 2024.

=== Hamilton Tiger-Cats ===
On February 19, 2025, the Hamilton Tiger-Cats announced that they had signed Smith. He was released on May 25, 2025.
