= Hadl =

Hadl is a surname. Notable people with the name include:

- Fahad Hadl (born 1988), Saudi Arabian footballer
- John Hadl (1940–2022), American football player

== See also ==
- Haydel, surname
