= Josh Pederson =

American football player (born 1997)

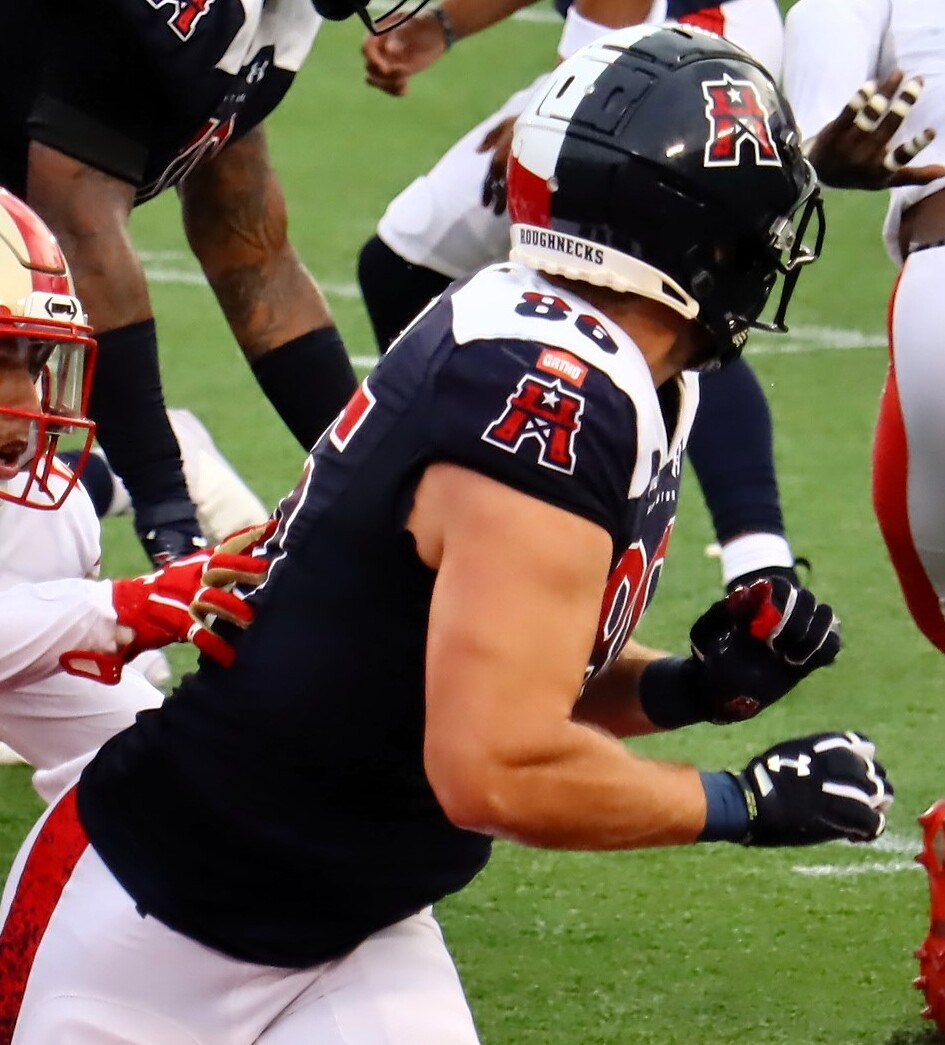
- Pederson with the Houston Roughnecks in 2025

Profile
- Position: Tight end

Personal information
- Born: September 22, 1997 (age 29); Newark, New Jersey, U.S.
- Listed height: 6 ft 5 in (1.96 m)
- Listed weight: 235 lb (107 kg)

Career information
- High school: Blue Valley North (KS)
- College: Louisiana–Monroe (2016–2020)
- NFL draft: 2021: undrafted

Career history
- San Francisco 49ers (2021)*; New Orleans Saints (2021)*; Kansas City Chiefs (2022)*; Houston Gamblers (2022–2023); Jacksonville Jaguars (2023–2024); Houston Roughnecks (2025)
- * Offseason or practice squad member only

Awards and highlights
- First-team All-Sun Belt (2019); Second-team All-Sun Belt (2020)

Career NFL statistics as of 2024
- Games played: 3
- Stats at Pro Football Reference

Josh Pederson (born September 22, 1997) is an American football tight end. He played college football at Louisiana-Monroe. He played for the Houston Gamblers of the United States Football League (USFL) from 2022 to 2023.

== Early life and education ==
Josh Pederson was born on September 22, 1997, in Newark, New Jersey, and was raised in New Jersey as well as Kansas. He went to high school at Blue Valley North, where he had 73 receptions for 1,102 yards and 16 touchdowns in two seasons. He was rated as a two-star recruit out of high school, and committed to playing college football at Louisiana–Monroe. He spent his first season as a redshirt.

In Pederson's second year, he was a redshirt-freshman, and played in 11 games, registering 12 catches for 136 yards. He played in 11 games the following year as well, making 12 catches for the second straight year.

In his junior year, Pederson was named First-team All-Sun Belt after posting 43 receptions for 567 yards and 9 scores.

He started every game his senior year, and recorded 32 catches for 367 yards.

== Professional career ==
Pre-draft measurables
Height	Weight	Arm length	Hand span	40-yard dash	10-yard split	20-yard split	20-yard shuttle	Three-cone drill	Vertical jump	Broad jump	Bench press
6 ft 4 3/8 in (1.94 m)	234 lb (106 kg)	31 1/2 in (0.80 m)	9 5/8 in (0.24 m)	4.81 s	1.74 s	2.77 s	4.43 s	7.31 s	28.5 in (0.72 m)	9 ft 2 in (2.79 m)	19 reps
All values from Pro Day

=== San Francisco 49ers ===
Pederson went unselected in the 2021 NFL draft and was subsequently signed as an undrafted free agent by the San Francisco 49ers. On August 4, 2021, Pederson was waived by the 49ers.

=== New Orleans Saints ===
On August 6, 2021, Pederson signed with the New Orleans Saints. He was waived on August 21.

=== Kansas City Chiefs ===
On February 11, 2022, Pederson signed a reserve/future contract with the Kansas City Chiefs. He was waived on May 5, 2022.

=== Houston Gamblers ===
Pederson signed with the Houston Gamblers of the United States Football League (USFL) on May 20, 2022, and was subsequently transferred to the team's inactive roster.

The following season, he made his USFL debut in the season opener, where he caught two passes for 23 yards in the 29–13 loss to the Michigan Panthers. He finished the season having appeared in all 10 games, while placing second on the team with 24 receptions for 325 yards. His contract with the Gamblers was terminated on July 6, 2023, to sign with an NFL team.

=== Jacksonville Jaguars ===
On July 7, 2023, after being released by the Gamblers, Pederson signed with the Jacksonville Jaguars, joining his father who was their head coach at the time. He was waived August 29. Pederson was then re-signed to the Jaguars practice squad the following day. He was elevated to the active roster and made his NFL debut against the Cincinnati Bengals in Week 13, making Pederson the first person to play for a father as head coach in the NFL since 1978.

Pederson signed a reserve/futures contract with the Jaguars on January 9, 2024. He was waived/injured on August 3.

=== Houston Roughnecks ===
On February 17, 2025, Pederson signed with the Houston Roughnecks of the United Football League (UFL).

== Career statistics ==
League	Year	Team	Games		Receiving				
League	Year	Team	GP	GS	Rec	Yds	Avg	Lng	TD
USFL	2023	HOU	10	6	24	325	13.5	40	0

== Personal life ==
Pederson is the son of former Jacksonville Jaguars coach Doug Pederson.
