= Kaylon Geiger =

American football player (born 1997)

Profile
- Position: Wide receiver

Personal information
- Born: November 1, 1997 (age 29); Fort Worth, Texas, U.S.
- Listed height: 5 ft 10 in (1.78 m)
- Listed weight: 180 lb (82 kg)

Career information
- High school: R. L. Paschal (TX)
- College: Navarro (2017–2018); Troy (2019–2020); Texas Tech (2021)
- NFL draft: 2022: undrafted

Career history
- Tampa Bay Buccaneers (2022); Hamilton Tiger-Cats (2024)*; Rhein Fire (2026–present)
- * Offseason or practice squad member only

Awards and highlights
- First-team All-Sun Belt (2019); Second-team All-Sun Belt (2020)

Career NFL statistics
- Games played: 3
- Stats at Pro Football Reference

Kaylon Trevell Geiger Sr. (born November 1, 1997) is an American professional football wide receiver for the Rhein Fire of the American Football League Europe (AFLE). He played college football at Navarro, Troy, and Texas Tech and was signed by the Tampa Bay Buccaneers as an undrafted free agent in 2022.

== Early life ==
Geiger was born on November 1, 1997, in Fort Worth, Texas. He attended R. L. Paschal High School and was a participant in football, basketball, and track and field. As a junior in football, he was named honorable mention all-district 4-6A. In track, Geiger set the school records in the 4x400 meter and 4x100 meter relays. He was a three-star prospect, according to 247Sports.

== College career ==
Geiger received little attention from major college football schools after graduating from R. L. Paschal, and as a result signed with the Navarro junior college team. He developed into one of the top JC receivers at Navarro. As a freshman, he led the team with 497 receiving yards and placed second with three touchdowns and third in receptions with 30. As a sophomore the following year, he made 70 catches and ranked second in the nation with 954 receiving yards. He scored five touchdowns and placed sixth in the United States with 86.7 yards per-game. He was a second-team All-Southwest Junior College Football Conference selection, and finished his junior college career placing third all time in school history with 100 catches and fifth with 1,451 receiving yards.

Geiger transferred to Troy in 2019, and "quickly adapted to the FBS level," recording 873 receiving yards on 77 catches and five touchdowns in his first season with the team. He was named first-team All-Sun Belt Conference and earned conference Newcomer of the Year honors. In his senior year, Geiger started all 11 games and was named second-team all-conference. He recorded 64 receptions for 752 yards and scored three touchdowns, and also was the team's primary kick returner.

After being given an extra year of eligibility due to the COVID-19 pandemic, Geiger decided to transfer to Texas Tech for a final season. He appeared in all 13 games and placed second on the team in receiving, with 44 catches for 533 yards and one touchdown. He was an honorable mention All-Big 12 Conference selection by the league's coaches. He ended his college career with a total of 184 receptions for 2,158 yards, scoring nine touchdowns in his time with Troy and Texas Tech.

== Professional career ==
Pre-draft measurables
Height	Weight	Arm length	Hand span	40-yard dash	10-yard split	20-yard split	20-yard shuttle	Three-cone drill	Vertical jump	Broad jump	Bench press
5 ft 9 3/8 in (1.76 m)	172 lb (78 kg)	29 1/8 in (0.74 m)	8 1/8 in (0.21 m)	4.56 s	1.58 s	2.64 s	4.22 s	6.77 s	34.0 in (0.86 m)	9 ft 10 in (3.00 m)	10 reps
All values from Pro Day

After going unselected in the 2022 NFL draft, Geiger was signed by the Tampa Bay Buccaneers as an undrafted free agent. He was released at the final roster cuts, on August 30, but was re-signed to the practice squad the following day. He was elevated to the active roster for their week two game against the New Orleans Saints, and made his NFL debut in the match, after which he was reverted back to the practice squad. He was signed to the active roster on September 21, after several players were injured and Mike Evans was suspended. He spent one week on the active roster before being waived on September 26. Two days later, he was re-signed to the practice squad. He signed a reserve/future contract on January 17, 2023. He was waived on August 28, 2023.

Geiger signed with the Hamilton Tiger-Cats of the Canadian Football League (CFL) on January 18, 2024. He was moved to the practice roster on June 2, and released on June 19, 2024.
