= Tarron Jackson =

American football player (born 1998)

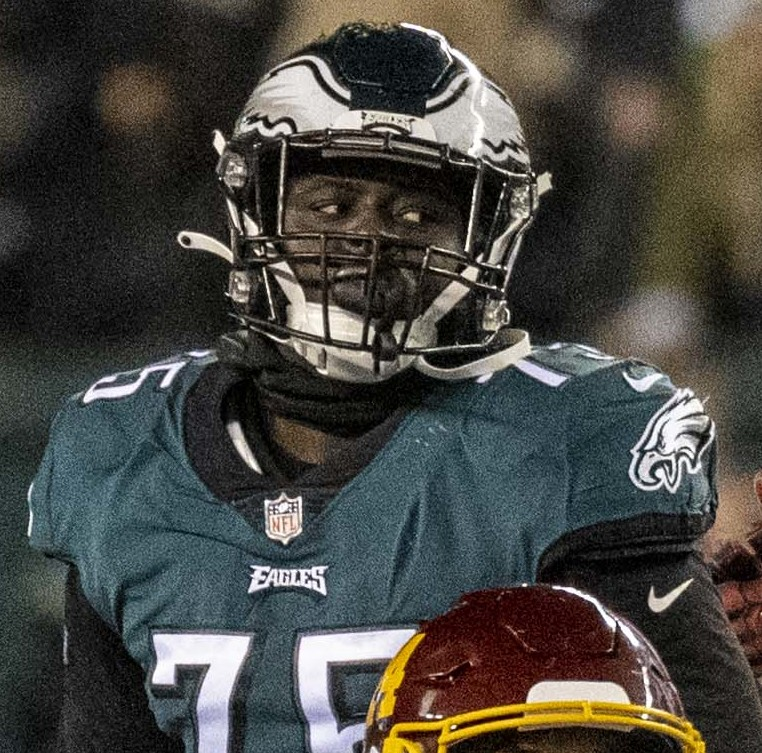
- Jackson with the Philadelphia Eagles in 2021

Profile
- Position: Outside linebacker

Personal information
- Born: June 22, 1998 (age 28); Aiken, South Carolina, U.S.
- Listed height: 6 ft 2 in (1.88 m)
- Listed weight: 254 lb (115 kg)

Career information
- High school: Silver Bluff (Aiken)
- College: Coastal Carolina (2016–2020)
- NFL draft: 2021: 6th round, 191st overall pick

Career history
- Philadelphia Eagles (2021–2023); Carolina Panthers (2024); Philadelphia Eagles (2024)*; San Francisco 49ers (2024–2025); Philadelphia Eagles (2026)*
- * Offseason or practice squad member only

Awards and highlights
- Consensus All-American (2020); Sun Belt Defensive Player of the Year (2020); 2× first-team All-Sun Belt (2019, 2020); Third-team All-Sun Belt (2018)

Career NFL statistics as of 2024
- Total tackles: 18
- Sacks: 1
- Forced fumbles: 1
- Stats at Pro Football Reference

Tarron Jackson (born June 22, 1998) is an American professional football outside linebacker. He played college football for the Coastal Carolina Chanticleers.

== Early life ==
Jackson grew up in New Ellenton, South Carolina and attended Silver Bluff High School. He was named All-Area by the Aiken Standard as a senior after recording 79 tackles, 11 tackles for loss and five sacks.

== College career ==
Jackson suffered a season-ending injury four games into his freshman year and used a medical redshirt. He played in the first eight games of his redshirt freshman season before again suffering a season-ending injury and finished the year with 3.5 sacks and a forced fumble. As a redshirt sophomore Jackson started all 12 of the Chanticleers' games and recorded 58 tackles with 11 tackles for loss and three sacks and was named third team All-Sun Belt Conference. He was named first team All-Sun Belt as a redshirt junior after setting a school record with ten sacks along with 60 total tackles, 13 tackles for loss and two forced fumbles. Jackson recorded 54 tackles, 14 tackles for loss, 8.5 sacks and three forced fumbles in his redshirt senior season and was named the Sun Belt Conference Defensive Player of the Year, first team All-Conference, and a first team All-American by the Associated Press.

== Professional career ==
Pre-draft measurables
Height	Weight	Arm length	Hand span	Wingspan	40-yard dash	10-yard split	20-yard split	20-yard shuttle	Three-cone drill	Vertical jump	Broad jump	Bench press
6 ft 2 1/8 in (1.88 m)	254 lb (115 kg)	33 1/4 in (0.84 m)	10 in (0.25 m)	6 ft 7 5/8 in (2.02 m)	4.71 s	1.70 s	2.72 s	4.46 s	7.44 s	29.5 in (0.75 m)	9 ft 10 in (3.00 m)	25 reps
All values from Pro Day

=== Philadelphia Eagles (first stint) ===
Jackson was selected in the sixth round with the 191st overall pick of the 2021 NFL draft by the Philadelphia Eagles. Jackson got his first career sack in Week 8 at the Detroit Lions.

On October 27, 2022, Jackson was waived by the Eagles and re-signed to the practice squad. On February 15, 2023, Jackson signed a reserve/future contract with the Eagles.

On August 29, 2023, Jackson was waived as part of final roster cuts. The next day, he re-signed to the team's practice squad. He signed a reserve/future contract on January 18, 2024. He was waived on August 27.

=== Carolina Panthers ===
On August 29, 2024, Jackson was signed to the Carolina Panthers practice squad. He was promoted to the active roster on September 19. Jackson was waived on October 15.

=== Philadelphia Eagles (second stint) ===
On November 7, 2024, the Philadelphia Eagles signed Jackson to their practice squad. He was released by Philadelphia on December 31.

=== San Francisco 49ers ===
On January 2, 2025, the San Francisco 49ers signed Jackson to their practice squad. He signed a reserve/future contract with the team on January 6. On July 29, Jackson was placed on injured reserve due to a neck injury.

=== Philadelphia Eagles (third stint) ===
On August 10, 2026, Jackson signed with the Philadelphia Eagles. On August 29, Jackson was released by the Eagles as a part of final roster cuts.
