= Shemar Jean-Charles =

American football player (born 1998)

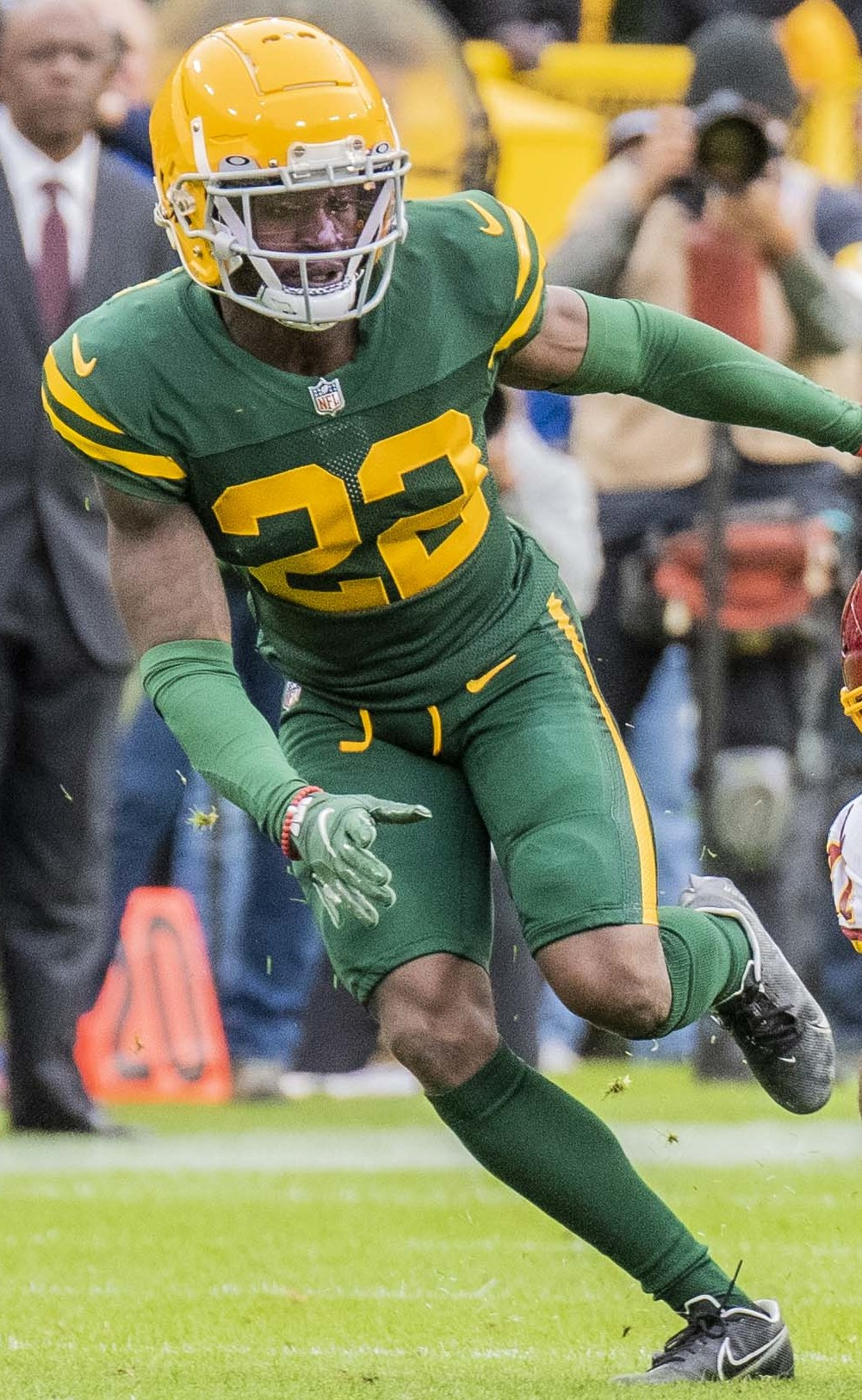
- Jean-Charles with the Green Bay Packers in 2021

Profile
- Position: Cornerback

Personal information
- Born: June 20, 1998 (age 28); Miramar, Florida, U.S.
- Listed height: 5 ft 10 in (1.78 m)
- Listed weight: 184 lb (83 kg)

Career information
- High school: Miramar (FL)
- College: Appalachian State (2017–2020)
- NFL draft: 2021: 5th round, 178th overall pick

Career history
- Green Bay Packers (2021–2022); San Francisco 49ers (2023); New Orleans Saints (2023–2024); Seattle Seahawks (2025)*
- * Offseason or practice squad member only

Awards and highlights
- Super Bowl champion (LX); Second-team All-American (2020); First-team All-Sun Belt (2020)

Career NFL statistics as of 2025
- Total tackles: 29
- Pass deflections: 2
- Interceptions: 1
- Stats at Pro Football Reference

Shemar Samson Jean-Charles (born June 20, 1998) is an American professional football cornerback. He played college football for the Appalachian State Mountaineers, and was selected in the fifth round of the 2021 NFL draft by the Green Bay Packers.

== Professional career ==
Pre-draft measurables
Height	Weight	Arm length	Hand span	Wingspan	40-yard dash	10-yard split	20-yard split	20-yard shuttle	Three-cone drill	Vertical jump	Broad jump	Bench press
5 ft 10 3/8 in (1.79 m)	184 lb (83 kg)	30 7/8 in (0.78 m)	8 3/4 in (0.22 m)	6 ft 4 in (1.93 m)	4.51 s	1.62 s	2.67 s	4.33 s	7.15 s	35.0 in (0.89 m)	10 ft 4 in (3.15 m)	19 reps
All values from Pro Day

=== Green Bay Packers ===
Jean-Charles was selected in the fifth round with the 178th overall pick by the Green Bay Packers in the 2021 NFL draft. He signed his rookie contract on May 14, 2021. He was released on August 29, 2023.

=== San Francisco 49ers ===
On August 31, 2023, Jean-Charles was signed to the practice squad of the San Francisco 49ers. He was promoted to the active roster on November 11 as Drake Jackson was placed on injured reserve. On November 23, he was waived.

=== New Orleans Saints ===
On November 29, 2023, Jean-Charles was signed to the New Orleans Saints practice squad. He was signed to the active roster on January 4, 2024.

On August 27, 2024, Jean-Charles was waived by the Saints as part of final roster cuts. On September 11, he was re-signed to the practice squad after Khaleke Hudson was signed off the team. Jean-Charles was promoted to the active roster on November 2 for his first career start against the Carolina Panthers. In the narrow Week 9 loss, he recorded his first career interception off Bryce Young, ripping a near-complete pass out of wide receiver Xavier Legette's hands.

=== Seattle Seahawks ===
On March 15, 2025, Jean-Charles signed a one-year contract with the Seattle Seahawks. On August 26, he was released from the Seahawks as part of final roster cuts, and was re-signed to the practice squad the following day.

On March 24, 2026, Jean-Charles re-signed with the Seahawks. He was placed on injured reserve on August 17 due to an injury suffered in the team's preseason matchup against the Dallas Cowboys. He was waived with an injury settlement on August 26.

== NFL career statistics ==
=== Regular season ===
Year	Team	Games		Tackles				Interceptions						Fumbles			
Year	Team	GP	GS	Comb	Solo	Ast	Sack	Int	Yds	Avg	Lng	TD	PD	FF	FR	Yds	TD
2021	GB	14	0	8	5	3	0.0	0	0	0	0	0	0	0	0	0	0
2022	GB	6	0	3	2	1	0.0	0	0	0	0	0	0	0	0	0	0
2023	SF	5	0	4	3	1	0.0	0	0	0	0	0	0	0	0	0	0
2023	NO	3	0	0	0	0	0.0	0	0	0	0	0	0	0	0	0	0
2024	NO	9	2	14	6	8	0.0	1	0	0	0	0	2	0	0	0	0
Career		37	2	29	16	13	0.0	1	0	0	0	0	2	0	0	0	0
Source: pro-football-reference.com

=== Postseason ===
Year	Team	Games		Tackles				Interceptions						Fumbles			
Year	Team	GP	GS	Comb	Solo	Ast	Sack	Int	Yds	Avg	Lng	TD	PD	FF	FR	Yds	TD
2021	GB	1	0	0	0	0	0.0	0	0	0	0	0	0	0	0	0	0
Career		1	0	0	0	0	0.0	0	0	0	0	0	0	0	0	0	0
Source: pro-football-reference.com
