= Raymond Johnson (defensive lineman) =

American football player (born 1998)

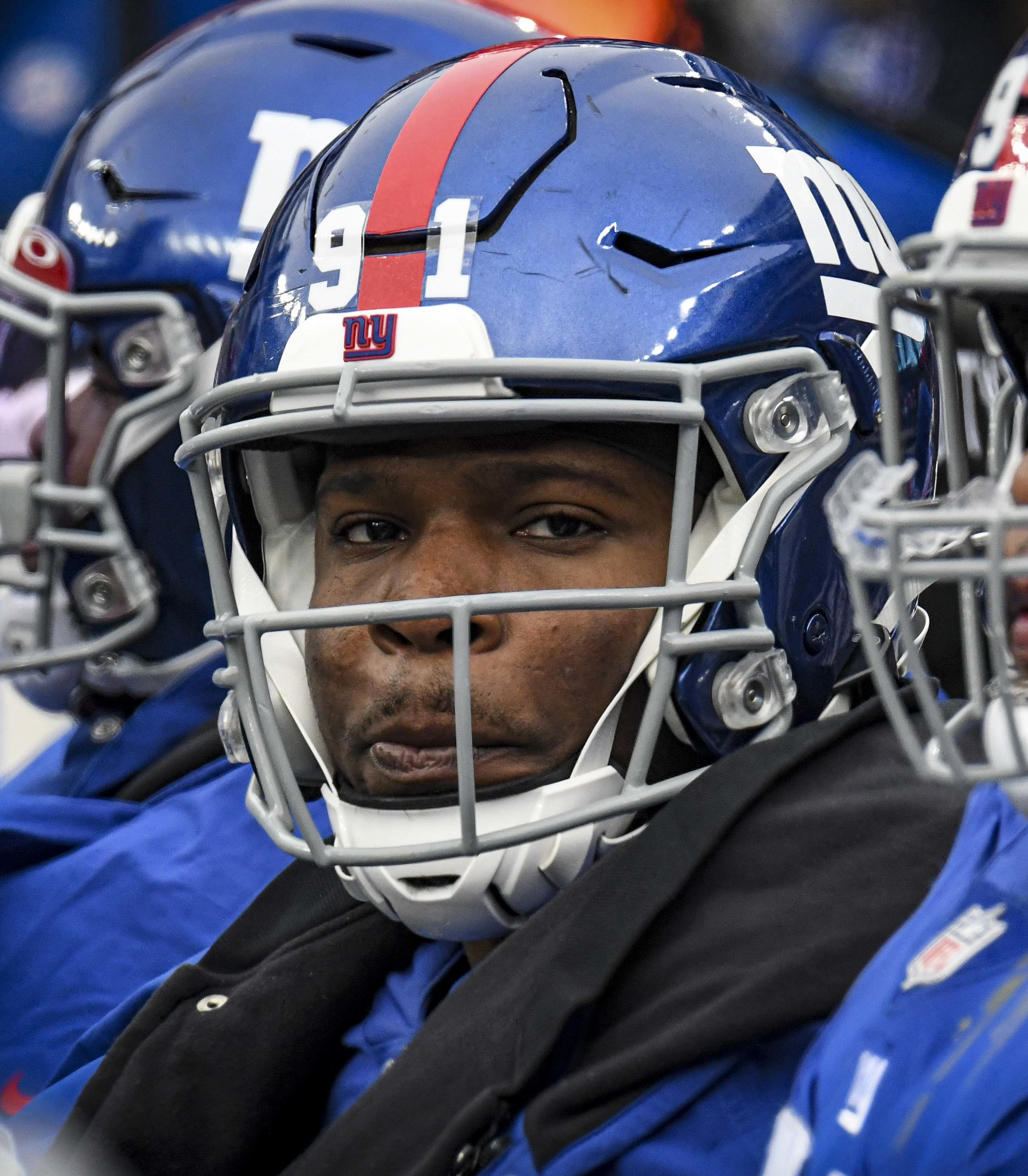
- Johnson with the New York Giants in 2022

Profile
- Position: Defensive end

Personal information
- Born: October 21, 1998 (age 28); Columbia, South Carolina, U.S.
- Listed height: 6 ft 3 in (1.91 m)
- Listed weight: 264 lb (120 kg)

Career information
- High school: Sumter (Sumter, South Carolina)
- College: Georgia Southern (2017–2020)
- NFL draft: 2021: undrafted

Career history
- New York Giants (2021); Cincinnati Bengals (2022)*; Detroit Lions (2023)*; San Francisco 49ers (2024)*; Jacksonville Jaguars (2024)*; Cincinnati Bengals (2024)*; St. Louis Battlehawks (2026)*
- * Offseason or practice squad member only

Awards and highlights
- 2× First-team All-Sun Belt (2019, 2020); Second-team All-Sun Belt (2018)

Career NFL statistics
- Total tackles: 4
- Sacks: 1
- Stats at Pro Football Reference

Raymond Johnson III (born October 21, 1998) is an American professional football defensive end. He played college football for the Georgia Southern Eagles.

== College career ==
Johnson played for the Georgia Southern Eagles for four seasons. As a senior, he was named first-team All-Sun Belt after recording 14.5 tackles for loss and five sacks. Johnson finished his collegiate career with 150 tackles, 36 tackles for loss, 16.5 sacks, six fumble recoveries, five passes defended and two forced fumbles.

== Professional career ==
Pre-draft measurables
Height	Weight	Arm length	Hand span	40-yard dash	10-yard split	20-yard split	20-yard shuttle	Three-cone drill	Vertical jump	Broad jump	Bench press
6 ft 2 1/2 in (1.89 m)	260 lb (118 kg)	33 1/4 in (0.84 m)	9 3/8 in (0.24 m)	4.78 s	1.68 s	2.77 s	4.71 s	7.21 s	33.0 in (0.84 m)	9 ft 7 in (2.92 m)	19 reps
All values from Pro Day

=== New York Giants ===
Johnson was signed by the New York Giants as an undrafted free agent on May 2, 2021. He made the team out of training camp. In Week 11 against the Tampa Bay Buccaneers Johnson III recorded his first career sack on Blaine Gabbert.

On May 18, 2022, Johnson was waived.

=== Cincinnati Bengals ===
On July 25, 2022, Johnson signed with the Cincinnati Bengals. He was waived on August 30, 2022, and signed to the practice squad the next day. He signed a reserve/future contract on January 31, 2023.

On August 29, 2023, Johnson was waived by the Bengals as part of their 53-man roster cutdown.

=== Detroit Lions ===
On August 31, 2023, Johnson was signed to the Detroit Lions' practice squad. He was released on December 5. Johnson was re-signed to the practice squad on January 4, 2024. He was released once more on January 23, following the signings of Jake Funk and Matt Farniok.

=== San Francisco 49ers ===
On February 15, 2024, Johnson signed with the San Francisco 49ers. On June 4, 2024, Johnson was waived by the 49ers.

=== Jacksonville Jaguars ===
On July 30, 2024, Johnson signed with the Jacksonville Jaguars. He was waived on August 25.

=== Cincinnati Bengals (second stint) ===
On October 16, 2024, Johnson was signed to the Cincinnati Bengals practice squad. He signed a reserve/future contract on January 7, 2025.

On August 26, 2025, Johnson was waived by the Bengals as part of final roster cuts.

=== St. Louis Battlehawks ===
On January 14, 2026, Johnson was selected by the St. Louis Battlehawks of the United Football League (UFL). He was released on March 19.
