= Quavian White =

American gridiron football player (born 2000)

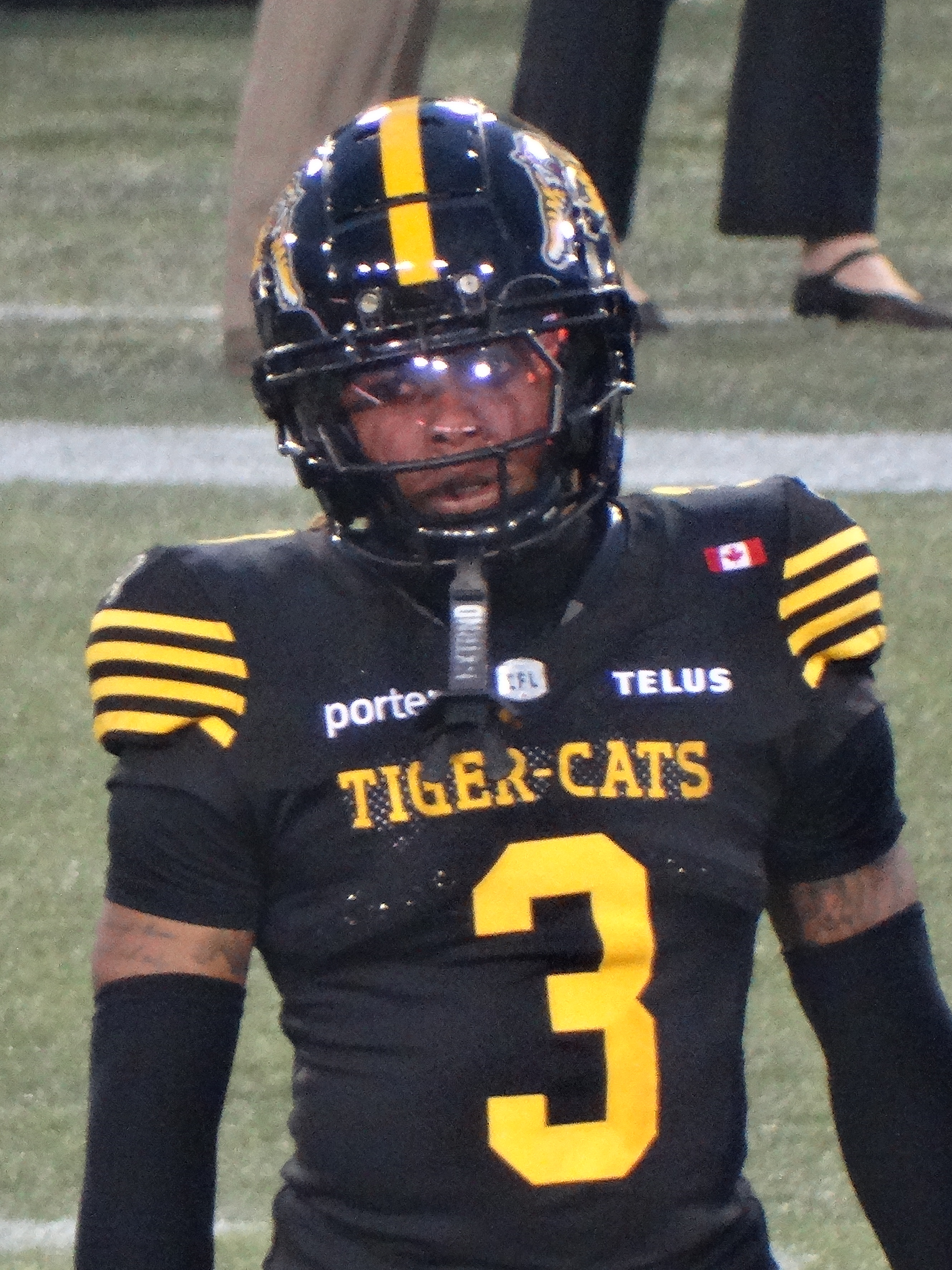

No. 3 – Hamilton Tiger-Cats
- Position: Defensive Back
- Roster status: Active
- CFL status: American

Personal information
- Born: June 12, 2000 (age 26); Greer, South Carolina, U.S.
- Listed height: 5 ft 8 in (1.73 m)
- Listed weight: 187 lb (85 kg)

Career information
- High school: Greer
- College: Georgia State (2018–2022)
- NFL draft: 2023: undrafted

Career history
- Arizona Cardinals (2023); Hamilton Tiger-Cats (2025–present)

Awards and highlights
- 2× Second-team All-Sun Belt (2020, 2022); Third-team All-Sun Belt (2021)
- Stats at Pro Football Reference
- Stats at CFL.ca

Quavian White (born June 12, 2000) is an American professional football cornerback for the Hamilton Tiger-Cats of the Canadian Football League (CFL). He played college football at Georgia State.

== Early life ==
White grew up in Greer, South Carolina and attended Greer High School where he played football and track and field. During his track career, he won Male Track MVP of the championship meeting his senior year. He was rated a three-star recruit and committed to play college football at Georgia State over offers from schools such as Appalachian State, Wisconsin and The Citadel.

== College career ==
In the 2018 season, White started 11 out of the 12 games. White finished the 2018 season with 42 tackles with one going for a loss, two pass deflections, an interception, and a forced fumble. White finished the 2019 season with 38 tackles with two being for a loss, seven pass deflections, and two interceptions. In the 2020 season, White recorded 49 tackles with three being for a loss, three interceptions, eight pass deflections. For his performance on the season, White was named to the Paul Hornung Award Weekly Honor Roll after the Week 1 game against No. 19 Louisiana. In the 2021 season, White notched 42 tackles with one being for a loss, an interception, and six pass deflections. In the 2022 season, White notched 29 tackles with four being for a loss, a sack, four interceptions, and nine pass deflections.

White finished his Georgia State career with 200 tackles with 10 going for a loss, 2.5 sacks, 32 pass deflections, 11 interceptions, one fumble recovery, and one forced fumble.

== Professional career ==
Pre-draft measurables
Height	Weight	Arm length	Hand span	Wingspan	40-yard dash	10-yard split	20-yard split	20-yard shuttle	Three-cone drill	Vertical jump	Broad jump	Bench press
5 ft 8 1/2 in (1.74 m)	185 lb (84 kg)	30 3/8 in (0.77 m)	9 1/4 in (0.23 m)	6 ft 2 in (1.88 m)	4.52 s	1.63 s	2.51 s	4.13 s	7.03 s	37.5 in (0.95 m)	10 ft 3 in (3.12 m)	9 reps
All Values from Pro Day

After not being selected in the 2023 NFL draft, White signed with the Arizona Cardinals as an undrafted free agent on May 1, 2023. He was released from the practice squad on September 1, 2023 but was resigned to the practice squad three days later. He was activated from the practice squad on September 16, 2023. He was released on September 26, 2023, then re-signed on October 10. He signed a reserve/future contract on January 8, 2024. He was waived on April 30, 2024.

White signed with the Hamilton Tiger-Cats on December 19, 2024.
