= Jeremiah Haydel =

American gridiron football player (born 1999)

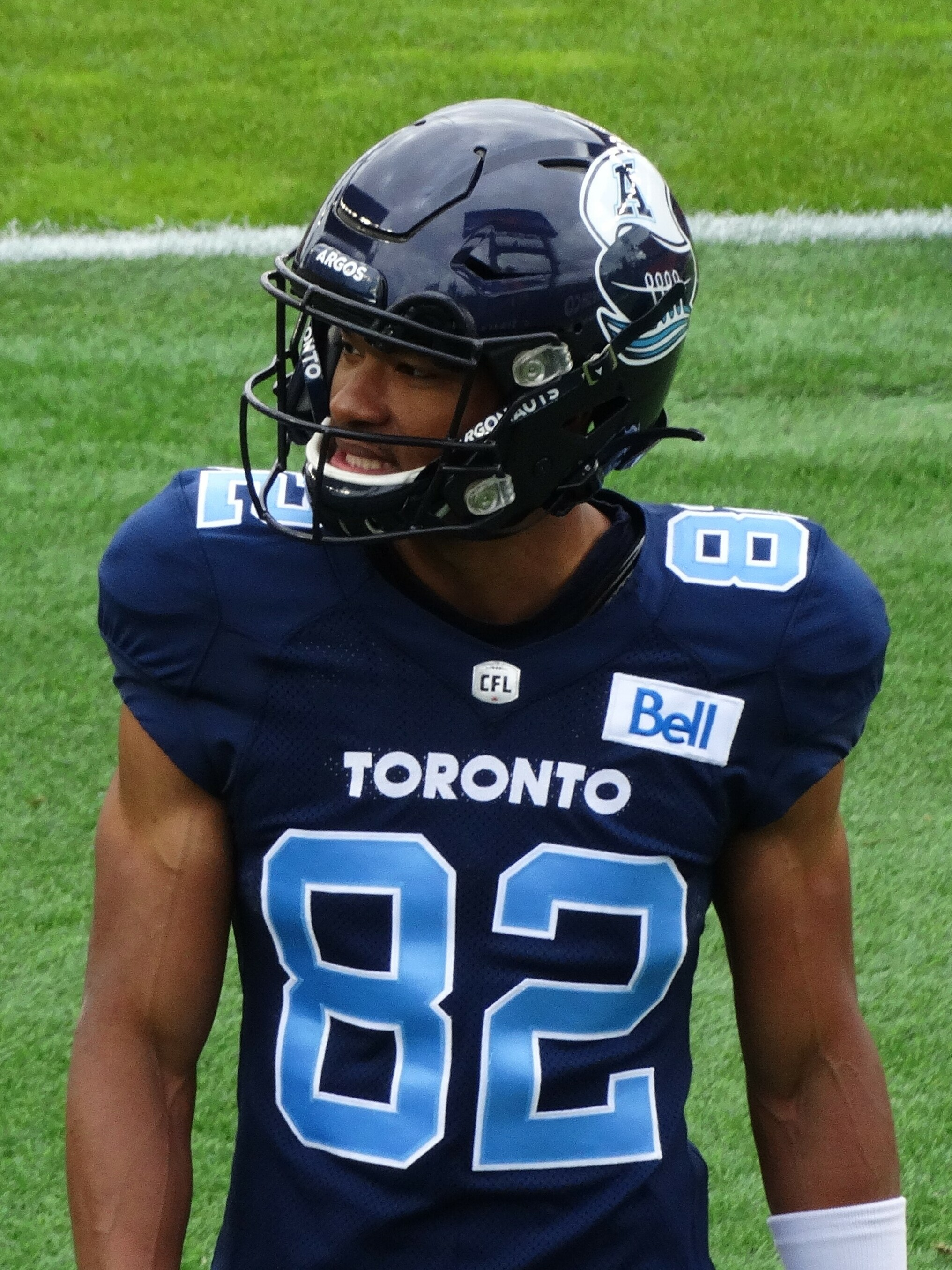
- Haydel with the Toronto Argonauts in 2022

No. 82
- Positions: Wide receiver, kick returner

Personal information
- Born: March 25, 1999 (age 27); Houston, Texas, U.S.
- Listed height: 6 ft 0 in (1.83 m)
- Listed weight: 170 lb (77 kg)

Career information
- High school: Alief Taylor (TX)
- College: Texas State
- NFL draft: 2021: undrafted

Career history
- Los Angeles Rams (2021)*; Saskatchewan Roughriders (2022)*; Toronto Argonauts (2022–2023)
- * Offseason or practice squad member only

Awards and highlights
- Grey Cup champion (2022); All-American (2020); Second-team All-Sun Belt (2020)
- Stats at CFL.ca

Jeremiah Haydel (born March 25, 1999) is an American former professional football wide receiver and kick returner. He played college football at Texas State.

== Early life ==
Haydel was born on March 25, 1999, in Houston, Texas. He attended Alief Taylor High School, and was a two-star recruit according to 247Sports.com. He made a total of 140 receptions for 1,700 yards and 15 touchdowns with the team.

== College career ==
Haydel committed to Texas State University, and saw immediate playing time as a true freshman in 2017, playing 12 games and making eight starts. He returned 22 kickoffs for 379 yards that year. As a sophomore in 2018, he started in all 12 games, and led the team's receivers with 326 yards on receptions and four touchdowns. Against Georgia State, he made the school's longest catch of the year, scoring on a 93-yard reception. He was a starter in eight games the following year and appeared in a total of eleven. He posted 32 catches for 324 yards on the year.

Haydel had his best season as a senior in 2020, earning All-American honors by ESPN, Football Writers Association of America, and Phil Steele. He started the season with an ESPN candidate for "Catch of the Year", with an "acrobatic" three-yard touchdown pass. The play went viral on social media, and had more than 2 million views. He also earned first-team All-Sun Belt Conference honors by Phil Steele, and was a second-team selection by Pro Football Focus. He was ranked third in the nation and led his conference in kick return yards with 687, and was one of two NCAA Division I-FBS players to return both a punt and kickoff back for a score. He recorded 16 punts for 208 yards on the year. Offensively, Haydel recorded 408 receiving yards and four touchdowns on 40 catches. He made the longest punt return of the season against UTSA, scoring on a 91-yarder.

== Professional career ==
=== Los Angeles Rams ===
After going unselected in the 2021 NFL draft, Haydel was signed by the Los Angeles Rams as an undrafted free agent. He was waived at the final roster cuts on August 30, 2021.

=== Saskatchewan Roughriders ===
On May 10, 2022, Haydel was signed by the Saskatchewan Roughriders. He played in both preseason games, but was released with the final cuts on June 5, 2022.

=== Toronto Argonauts ===
On August 3, 2022, it was announced that Haydel had signed with the Toronto Argonauts. He made his regular season professional debut on September 5, 2022, in the Labour Day Classic against the Hamilton Tiger-Cats, where he had seven punt returns for 45 yards and two kickoff returns for 44 yards.

In 2023, Haydel played in six games and had four catches for 56 yards. He ended the season on the practice roster and his contract expired on November 13, 2023, after the team's East Final loss.
