= 2020 BYU vs. Coastal Carolina football game =

American college football game

BYU vs. Coastal Carolina
- Non-conference game
BYU Cougars	Coastal Carolina Chanticleers
(9–0)	(9–0)
Independent	Sun Belt
17	22
Head coach: Kalani Sitake	Head coach: Jamey Chadwell
AP / Coaches / CFP; 8 / 8 / 13	AP / Coaches / CFP; 14 / 14 / 18
	1	2	3	4	Total
BYU	0	14	3	0	17
Coastal Carolina	6	7	3	6	22
- Date: December 5, 2020
- Season: 2020
- Stadium: Brooks Stadium
- Location: Conway, South Carolina
- Favorite: BYU by 10
- Referee: Kyle Olson (Sun Belt)
- Attendance: 5,000 (limited capacity due to COVID-19)

United States TV coverage
- Network: ESPNU
- Announcers: Bill Roth, Dustin Fox, and Ryan McGee

The 2020 BYU vs. Coastal Carolina football game was a regular-season college football game played on December 5, 2020, at Brooks Stadium in Conway, South Carolina. The matchup, played as a part of the 2020 FBS football season, featured the BYU Cougars, an FBS independent, and Coastal Carolina Chanticleers, representing the Sun Belt Conference. Both teams entered the game ranked, with BYU at No. 13 and Coastal Carolina at No. 18 in the College Football Playoff rankings, and undefeated, both at nine wins and no losses. The game was scheduled as a 5:30 p.m. ET kickoff broadcast on ESPNU.

The game was scheduled at short notice after Liberty, Coastal Carolina's original opponent, had to withdraw due to the ongoing COVID-19 pandemic. Both Coastal Carolina and BYU entered the game as contenders for a spot in a New Year's Six bowl game, though they were not candidates for the College Football Playoff. The ESPN pregame show College GameDay traveled to Conway for the contest.

The game was scoreless until the last ten seconds of the first quarter, when Coastal's C. J. Marable scored a six-yard touchdown rush at the conclusion of a 17-play drive that spanned 94 yards and over nine minutes. The teams traded three touchdowns in the second quarter, with BYU scoring two and Coastal Carolina scoring one. BYU quarterback Zach Wilson gave his team the lead with a 41-yard touchdown pass, and BYU led 14–13 at halftime. BYU increased their lead with a field goal on their first drive of the second half, but fumbled the ball back to Coastal on their next drive, resulting in a quick field goal for the Chanticleers. Coastal Carolina captured the lead with a touchdown rush, though a failed two-point conversion kept their lead to five points. Each of the next two drives for both teams resulted in punts, and BYU got the ball back for a potential game-winning drive. On the game's last play, BYU wide receiver Dax Milne came up one yard short of the goal line, securing a 22–17 win for Coastal Carolina.

== Background ==
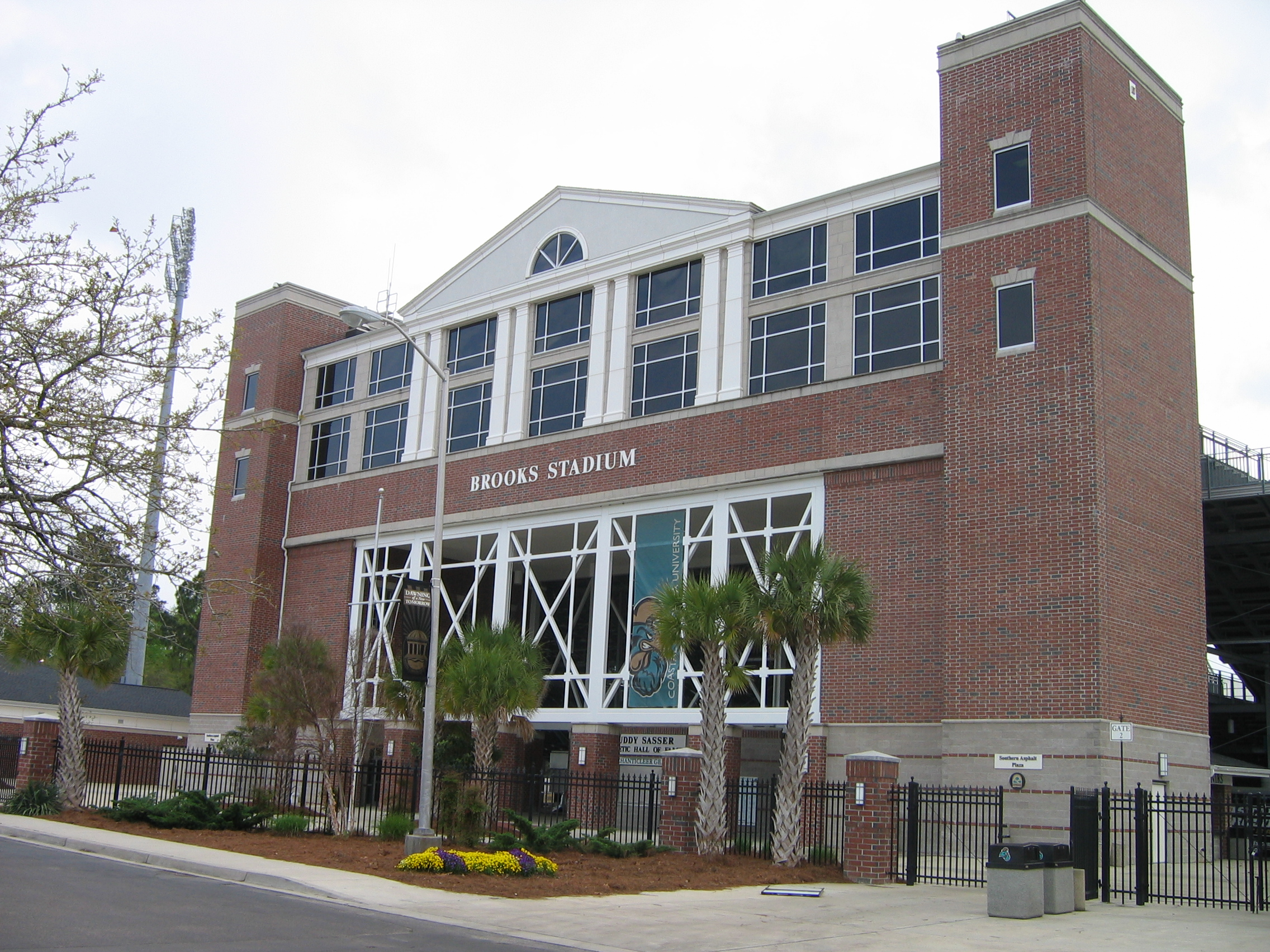
The game was hosted by Coastal Carolina at Brooks Stadium in Conway, South Carolina (exterior pictured).

The COVID-19 pandemic caused numerous scheduling issues during the 2020 college football season. Originally, Coastal Carolina was scheduled to play Liberty at home in South Carolina. Liberty itself was 9–1 and ranked No. 25 in the AP Poll; its only loss had come in a close game with NC State two weeks earlier. A rising number of COVID-19 cases within the program led Liberty to drop out less than a week prior to game day, and BYU, who had not originally been scheduled to play that week, and had hopes of making the College Football Playoff, worked to schedule this game in its place.

BYU athletic director Tom Holmoe told ESPN journalist Heather Dinich that he had not heard about Liberty's predicament until the Wednesday before the game; by the end of that day, he had sent the Cougars' football equipment truck to Conway before even confirming that the two teams would play. He would tell Dinich, "If it had to turn around and come back, turn around and come back, but we're not going to miss a game because we don't have our equipment. Our guys just wanted to do it. They pushed me." The game was not officially confirmed until the following day, with ESPN playing a key role in the process, and even then the two schools had yet to enter into any kind of written agreement. Holmoe told Dinich that BYU and Coastal would work out a future return game, presumably hosted by BYU at LaVell Edwards Stadium in Provo, Utah, after the 2020 season.

The game was only the sixth meeting between unbeaten college football teams in December (excluding bowl games in NCAA Division I FBS and playoff games at lower levels of play), and the first such meeting since the 2009 SEC Championship Game. Neither BYU nor Coastal Carolina were in the picture for the College Football Playoff National Championship, despite their undefeated seasons, but a strong showing could earn them a spot in a New Year's Six bowl game.

ESPN's College GameDay program traveled to Conway for the game. Host Lee Corso praised both teams, but picked BYU to win:

Coastal is 9–0 and 18th in the playoff ranking...And they're playing at home – that's really good stuff. But BYU is 9–0 and 13th in the playoff rankings. BYU will play anybody, anywhere, anytime – so I'm going with BYU. Go Cougars!

Some people sported t-shirts to the game that said "Mormons vs. Mullets", a play on Catholics vs. Convicts, which was a game played in 1988 between Notre Dame and Miami. "Mormons" references BYU's affiliation with the Church of Jesus Christ of Latter-day Saints, whose adherents are commonly known as the Mormons, while "Mullets" references the haircuts worn by many Coastal players.

== Teams ==
=== BYU Cougars ===
The BYU Cougars, representing Brigham Young University, entered the season led by fifth-year head coach Kalani Sitake. Many of BYU's scheduled games for the 2020 season were canceled due to decisions by numerous conferences to play shortened or conference-only schedules as a result of COVID-19. The Cougars opened their season with a road contest on Monday, November 7, when they defeated Navy by a score of 55–3. This win propelled them to a No. 18 ranking in the AP Poll, though they fell to No. 22 the following week after another sound win, this time at home against Troy. BYU played Louisiana Tech in another home game the following week, winning by 31 points. Their next game was against UTSA for homecoming, which the Cougars won by a touchdown. Now ranked No. 14, BYU traveled to Houston and won by 17 points, which they followed up with a dominant 52–14 home victory against Texas State. A win against Western Kentucky put the Cougars at a 7–0 record going into the month of November, with a ranking in the AP top ten. BYU's first game against a ranked opponent came on November 6, when they defeated No. 21 Boise State on the road, 51–17. After a bye week, the No. 8 Cougars defeated North Alabama by 52 points. The first College Football Playoff rankings were released three days later, with BYU ranked at No. 14, though, after another bye, they rose to No. 13 entering their matchup at Coastal Carolina.

=== Coastal Carolina Chanticleers ===
The Coastal Carolina Chanticleers, representing Coastal Carolina University, entered the season led by second-year head coach Jamey Chadwell. Like BYU, several of their games were cancelled over COVID-19 concerns; as a result, Coastal did not play their first game until September 12, when they faced Kansas. The Chanticleers won by fifteen points, and defeated Campbell the following week in their first home game. The Chanticleers defeated Arkansas State to begin October, and won an away contest at No. 21 Louisiana on a Wednesday evening by three points the next week, for their first win over a ranked program in school history. This win put the Chanticleers themselves in the top 25 for their next game against Georgia Southern, who they defeated by two touchdowns. Coastal Carolina entered the top fifteen after a 51-point shutout win at Georgia State on October 31, in time for their homecoming matchup against South Alabama. The Chanticleers defeated South Alabama, 23–6, going into a bye week. Afterwards, Coastal defeated Appalachian State by eleven points, and were subsequently ranked No. 20 in the first College Football Playoff rankings. The following week, Coastal defeated Texas State to clinch the Sun Belt East Division title and a spot in the conference championship game. The win put them at 9–0 and ranked No. 18 headed into the game against BYU.

== Game summary ==
=== First half ===
Scheduled for a 5:30 p.m. EST start, the game began at 5:37 p.m. as Jake Oldroyd's opening kickoff resulted in a touchback. The Chanticleers offense began the game with a 13-yard rush by C. J. Marable, good for a first down. That was their only such play of the drive, though, as they stalled soon after due to a holding penalty. They ended up punting on fourth down from their own 39-yard-line, which was downed at the BYU 9-yard-line. The Cougars' first drive of the game saw them called for a similar holding penalty on their first play, setting them back five yards, but they gained a first down three plays later on an 18-yard rush by Zach Wilson. Tyler Allgeier would gain another three plays later, but an incomplete pass and a five-yard rush set them back at third down. Here, they were unable to pick up the required yardage, and had to punt on 4th & 6 from their own 47-yard-line. The punt was caught by Jordan Morris at the Coastal Carolina 1-yard-line and returned to the Coastal 6-yard-line. The Chanticleers gained two first downs within the first four plays of their ensuing drive: a 14-yard pass from quarterback Grayson McCall to wide receiver Kameron Brown, and a 7-yard rush by Marable, though they would face a 3rd & 1 at their own 41-yard-line a few plays later. Shermari Jones ran for 2 yards to continue the drive, and would do so again, this time gaining seven yards, on another 3rd & 1 several plays later. Jones rushed again for 4 yards on the ensuing first down play, and Marable rushed twice for 2 and 11 yards, respectively, before McCall passed to Isaiah Likely for a first down at the BYU 16-yard-line, marking the first red zone appearance for either team. From there, Reese White rushed twice for a total of ten yards before Marable scored the game's first touchdown on a six-yard rush with ten seconds remaining in the first quarter. Placekicker Massimo Biscardi missed the extra point, leaving the Coastal Carolina lead at 6–0. Biscardi's kickoff was returned by Caleb Christensen to the BYU 24-yard-line, and the Cougars ran one play, a 12-yard rush by Wilson, before the end of the first quarter.

BYU began the second quarter with a 16-yard pass from Wilson to Neil Pau'u, gaining a first down, and they got on the scoreboard two plays later, as Allgeier rushed for a 42-yard touchdown on 2nd & 4. Jake Oldroyd converted the extra point, giving BYU a 1-point lead. Oldroyd's kickoff resulted in a touchback, and Coastal started their drive at their own 25-yard-line. They gained a first down in two plays, and another one play later, though the drive stopped on the next play after McCall fumbled the ball, which was recovered by Isaiah Kaufusi at the BYU 42-yard-line. The Cougars took possession as a result, and ran three rushing plays for a total of nine yards, leaving them with a 4th & 1 at the Coastal Carolina 49-yard-line. They opted to go for it, though their attempt was unsuccessful as Wilson's pass to Gunnar Romney was incomplete. This resulted in a turnover on downs, giving Coastal possession back. The Chanticleers entered BYU territory in one play, with a 5-yard rush by Jones, and they gained a first down on the next play. They gained two further first downs on rushing plays, the second of which put them inside the BYU 10-yard-line. A rush by McCall for six yards several plays later put the Chanticleers at the BYU 1-yard-line, and they scored on the next play as Reese White rushed for a touchdown on 4th & goal. BYU started their ensuing drive at their own 6-yard-line after a penalty for an illegal block. They gained a first down on the next play, as Wilson passed to Romney for 18 yards, and Wilson rushed for 17 yards to reach Coastal Carolina territory later in the drive. The next play, Wilson passed for 41 yards to Milne for a touchdown, regaining the lead for BYU following Oldroyd's extra point. Coastal Carolina got the ball back after a touchback, and their drive that followed was the game's first three-and-out after a holding penalty on second down. Charles Ouverson's punt on 4th & 7 was returned to the BYU 10-yard-line. Getting the ball back with just over thirty seconds left in the half, the drive ended with a Hail Mary being intercepted by Derick Bush at the 1-yard-line and returned to the Coastal 43-yard-line. After Wilson released the pass on this last play of the half, he was blocked and tackled by two Coastal Carolina defensive linemen, Jeffrey Gunter and Teddy Gallagher, even after the play was dead. A brief scuffle broke out as a result, which was broken up by coaches and referees.

=== Second half ===
The second half began with a kickoff returned by BYU's Christensen to the Cougars' 32-yard-line. A 12-yard rush by Wilson on the drive's second play was extended by a personal foul, putting the ball on the Coastal Carolina 41-yard-line; this was immediately followed by a 23-yard pass from Wilson to Pau'u which put the ball in the red zone. From there, BYU stalled, and ended up kicking a 29-yard field goal to increase their lead to four points. After a touchback, Coastal began their first drive of the second half at their own 25-yard-line. The Chanticleers picked up a first down with a 7-yard Grayson McCall rush but could not gain another, and were forced to punt on 4th & 3 from their own 42-yard-line. BYU gave the ball back quickly; a fumble by Allgeier was forced by Jeffrey Gunter and recovered by Coastal's Silas Kelly on the first play of the Cougars' drive. The Chanticleers were unable to move the ball, gaining seven yards on the next three plays and narrowing BYU's lead to one point on a 41-yard field goal by Massimo Biscardi. BYU began their next drive at their own 25-yard-line, and they quickly gained a first down on the ground and then another through the air. On 2nd & 8 from the Coastal 38-yard-line, Wilson was sacked for a loss of 12 yards, putting BYU back to midfield on third down. They were unable to recover, and Ryan Rehkow's punt was fair caught at the Coastal Carolina 15-yard-line. C. J. Marable opened the drive quickly, with a 12-yard rush to the 27-yard-line and a first down. The Chanticleers gained two first downs on their next three plays, and Marable ran twice for nine yards combined afterward to reach the BYU 42-yard-line before the end of the game's third quarter.

Coastal Carolina began the fourth quarter facing a 3rd & 1, which they converted with a 4-yard rush by Reese White. Following an incomplete pass, a pair of 7-yard rushes by McCall and White gained another first down. After another play, McCall passed to Kameron Brown for a 20-yard gain, setting the Chanticleers up for a 1st & goal from the BYU 2-yard-line. Coastal took the lead on the next play, scoring on a 2-yard rush by C. J. Marable, though their two-point conversion in an attempt to increase their lead to an even seven points was unsuccessful. Trailing by five points, BYU got the ball back at their own 36-yard-line following a 29-yard kickoff return by Christensen. The Cougars gained a first down in two plays but stalled from there as a result of a loss of 16 yards on a passing play from Wilson to Chris Jackson on second down. They punted the ball back two plays later, and Coastal Carolina took possession at their own 21-yard-line. Each team's next drive resulted in a three-and-out, as the Chanticleers were set back by a false start penalty on third down and the Cougars rushed for a loss of two yards on their third down play. Coastal got the ball back with just under five minutes to play on their own 19-yard-line, and gained two consecutive first downs after their first play resulted in a five-yard gain. After another four-yard gain, BYU was forced to call a timeout with 2:38 remaining. A pair of 2-yard rushes and a Coastal timeout with just over one minute left on the clock, followed by a punt, gave BYU the ball at their own 18-yard-line with a chance for a game-winning drive. After a holding penalty and an incomplete pass to start the drive, Zach Wilson completed a string of passes totaling 33, 12, and 15 yards to Romney, Allgeier, and Milne, respectively. Another 13-yard pass to Milne with seven seconds remaining moved the ball to the Coastal Carolina 18-yard-line with time for one final play. On the game's last play, Wilson passed complete to Milne, but Milne was tackled one yard shy of the goal line with no time left. As a result, Coastal Carolina won the game, 22–17.

=== Scoring summary ===
Scoring summary

Quarter	Time	Drive			Team	Scoring information	Score	
Quarter	Time	Plays	Yards	TOP	Team	Scoring information	BYU	Coastal Carolina
1	0:10	17	94	9:05	Coastal Carolina	C. J. Marable 6-yard touchdown run, Massimo Biscardi kick no good	0	6
2	13:50	4	76	1:15	BYU	Tyler Allgeier 42-yard touchdown run, Jake Oldroyd kick good	7	6
2	4:00	11	51	5:54	Coastal Carolina	Reese White 1-yard touchdown run, Massimo Biscardi kick good	7	13
2	1:45	6	94	2:07	BYU	Dax Milne 41-yard touchdown reception from Zach Wilson, Jake Oldroyd kick good	14	13
3	12:28	7	56	2:27	BYU	29-yard field goal by Jake Oldroyd	17	13
3	6:32	4	7	2:07	Coastal Carolina	41-yard field goal by Massimo Biscardi	17	16
4	11:35	13	85	6:06	Coastal Carolina	C. J. Marable 2-yard touchdown run, 2-point run no good	17	22
"TOP" = time of possession. For other American football terms, see Glossary of American football.							17	22

== Statistics ==
Team statistical comparison
Statistic	BYU	Coastal Carolina
First downs	21	22
First downs rushing	8	18
First downs passing	12	4
First downs penalty	1	0
Third down efficiency	4–10	6–13
Fourth down efficiency	0–1	1–1
Total plays–net yards	58–405	69–366
Rushing attempts–net yards	26–165	54–281
Yards per rush	6.3	5.2
Yards passing	240	85
Pass completions–attempts	19–32	10–15
Interceptions thrown	1	0
Punt returns–total yards	2–10	1–5
Kickoff returns–total yards	4–89	0–0
Punts–average yardage	4–163	5–200
Fumbles–lost	3–1	1–1
Penalties–yards	3–20	4–40
Time of possession	22:09	37:51

BYU statistics
Cougars passing
	C–A	Yds	TD–INT
Zach Wilson	19–30	240	1–1
TEAM	0–2	0	0–0
Cougars rushing
	Car	Yds	TD
Tyler Allgeier	13	106	1
Zach Wilson	10	55	0
Lopini Katoa	2	4	0
Neil Pau'u	1	0	0
Cougars receiving
	Rec	Yds	TD
Dax Milne	6	106	1
Neil Pau'u	4	76	0
Gunner Romney	4	47	0
Isaac Rex	3	15	0
Tyler Allgeier	1	12	0
Chris Jackson	1	−16	0

Coastal Carolina statistics
Chanticleers passing
	C–A	Yds	TD–INT
Grayson McCall	10–15	85	0–0
Chanticleers rushing
	Car	Yds	TD
C. J. Marable	23	132	2
Grayson McCall	12	68	0
Reese White	12	53	1
Shermari Jones	7	28	0
Chanticleers receiving
	Rec	Yds	TD
Kameron Brown	4	47	0
Isaiah Likely	3	28	0
C. J. Marable	3	10	0

== Aftermath ==
The game had an average viewership of 1.212 million viewers, making it the most-watched college football broadcast on ESPNU since a matchup between LSU and Western Kentucky in 2015. The viewership peaked at 2.115 million viewers at 8:50 p.m., near the end of the game, and it was ESPNU's fifth most-watched college football broadcast overall. A highlight clip from the game was the most-viewed clip from any Week 14 game on any ESPN digital platform, receiving 1.4 million views, and the full-game highlight video posted to the ESPN College Football channel on YouTube has over 100,000 views as of 2022.

The game dropped BYU's record to 9–1 with their first loss, though it would be their only loss of the season. They returned home to play San Diego State the following week, defeating the Aztecs by two touchdowns. That game was initially cancelled as a result of a decision made by the Mountain West Conference to suspend their 2020 season, though a later decision allowed San Diego State to play BYU. They rose to No. 16 in the rankings after the win and accepted an invite to the Boca Raton Bowl to play UCF. BYU won the bowl game convincingly, ending their season with a record of 11–1 and a final AP and Coaches' Poll ranking of No. 11.

The Chanticleers improved to 10–0 with their win, and improved to No. 13 in the College Football Playoff rankings as a result. They traveled to play Troy in their final regular season game of the year, and their final conference game, which they won by four points following a late-game touchdown pass with 35 seconds remaining. This win got them to No. 12 in the College Football Playoff poll and No. 9 in the AP Poll, marking their first-ever top-ten ranking and the highest ranking achieved in program history. As a result of their divisional title, which they clinched following their win against Texas State on November 28, Coastal Carolina earned a bid to the Sun Belt Conference Football Championship Game, which would have been played against West Division champions Louisiana. However, due to an outbreak of COVID-19 within the Coastal Carolina program (which would have eliminated an entire position group for the championship game), Coastal Carolina and Louisiana were named Sun Belt co-champions for the 2020 season. The Chanticleers' season ended on December 26, 2020, with a game against Liberty in the Cure Bowl. A blocked field goal in overtime gave Liberty a three-point victory and Coastal Carolina finished the season with a record of 11–1 as a result. The Chanticleers finished the season ranked No. 14 in both the AP and Coaches' Poll.
