= Emmanuel Ogbuehi =

American football player (born 1990)

Profile
- Position: Tight end

Personal information
- Born: August 17, 1990 (age 36); Buford, Georgia, U.S.
- Listed height: 6 ft 3 in (1.91 m)
- Listed weight: 250 lb (113 kg)

Career information
- College: Georgia State
- NFL draft: 2013: undrafted

Career history
- Washington Redskins (2013)*; Miami Dolphins (2013–2014)*; Cleveland Browns (2014)*; Baltimore Ravens (2014)*; Tampa Bay Buccaneers (2015)*
- * Offseason or practice squad member only
- Stats at Pro Football Reference

Emmanuel Ogbuehi (born August 17, 1990) is an American former professional football tight end. He signed with the Washington Redskins as an undrafted free agent in 2013.

== Professional career ==
=== Washington Redskins ===
After going unselected in the 2013 NFL draft, Ogbuehi signed with the Washington Redskins on May 2, 2013. He was released by the team during their final cuts before the start of the 2013 season.

=== Miami Dolphins ===
On June 11, 2014, the Dolphins waived Ogbuehi.

=== Cleveland Browns ===
The Cleveland Browns claimed Ogbuehi off waivers on June 12, 2014.

=== Baltimore Ravens ===
Ogbuehi was signed to the practice squad of the Baltimore Ravens on November 26, 2014.

=== Tampa Bay Buccaneers ===
On April 3, 2015, Ogbuehi was signed by the Tampa Bay Buccaneers.
