= Josh Norman =

American football player (born 1987)

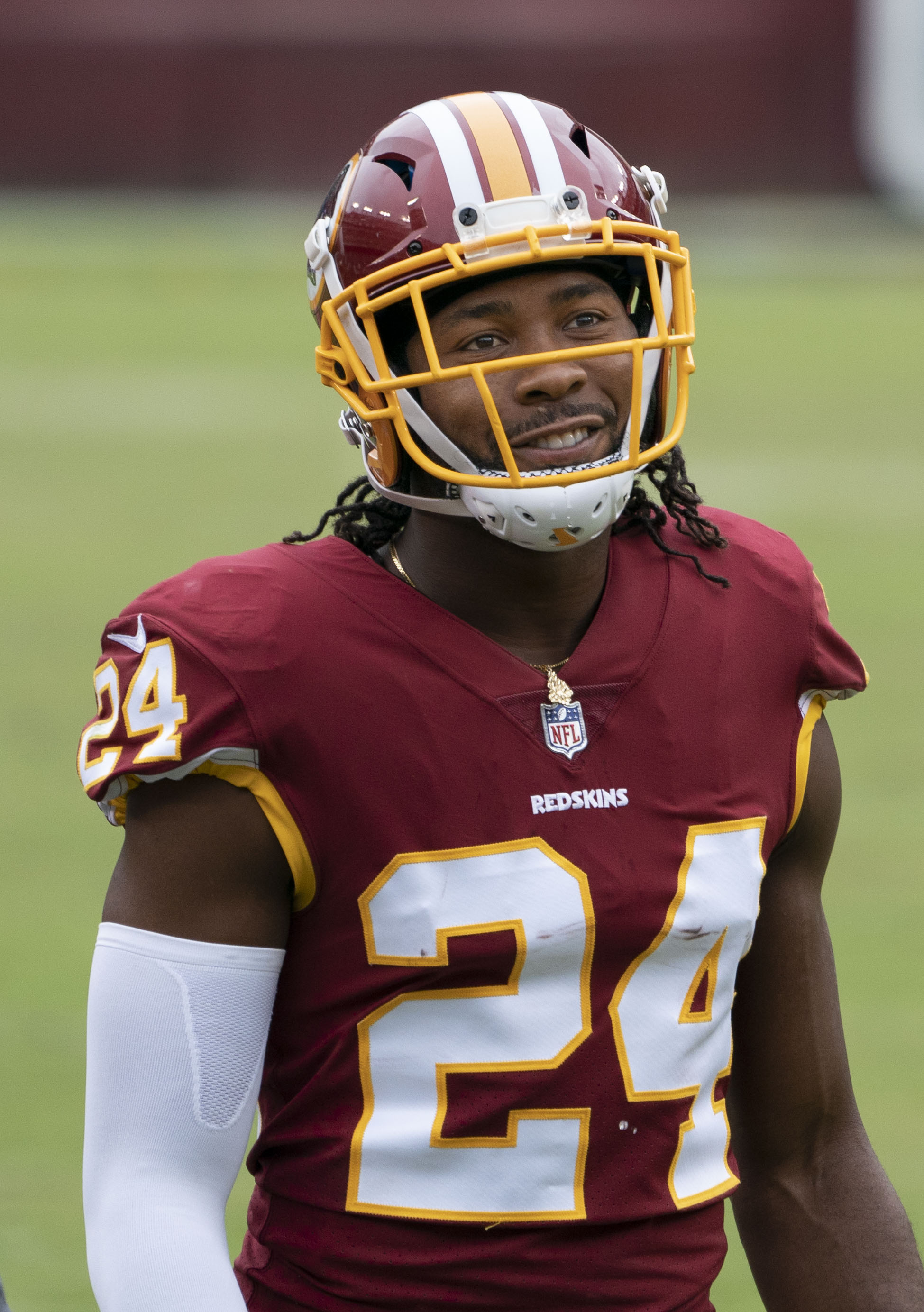
- Norman with the Washington Redskins in 2018

No. 24, 28, 29, 26, 6
- Position: Cornerback

Personal information
- Born: December 15, 1987 (age 38); Greenwood, South Carolina, U.S.
- Listed height: 6 ft 0 in (1.83 m)
- Listed weight: 200 lb (91 kg)

Career information
- High school: Greenwood
- College: Coastal Carolina (2008–2011)
- NFL draft: 2012: 5th round, 143rd overall pick

Career history
- Carolina Panthers (2012–2015); Washington Redskins (2016–2019); Buffalo Bills (2020); San Francisco 49ers (2021); Carolina Panthers (2022); Buffalo Bills (2023)

Awards and highlights
- First-team All-Pro (2015); Pro Bowl (2015); First-team FCS All-American (2011); 3× first-team All-Big South (2009–2011)

Career NFL statistics
- Total tackles: 501
- Forced fumbles: 20
- Fumble recoveries: 7
- Pass deflections: 88
- Interceptions: 16
- Defensive touchdowns: 3
- Stats at Pro Football Reference

Joshua Ricardo Norman (born December 15, 1987) is an American former professional football cornerback who played in the National Football League (NFL). He played college football for the Coastal Carolina Chanticleers and was selected by the Carolina Panthers in the fifth round of the 2012 NFL draft. Norman has also played for the Washington Redskins, Buffalo Bills, and San Francisco 49ers, and was once considered to be among the best cornerbacks in the NFL. He also participated in the celebrity dancing competition show Dancing with the Stars, finishing as the runner-up of its 26th season in 2018.

== Early life ==
Norman attended Greenwood High School in Greenwood, South Carolina where he was a teammate of other future NFL players in Armanti Edwards and D. J. Swearinger. In 2006, Norman was the only two-way player on his high school team that won the South Carolina State Championship. He was named an All-State football player and was selected to participate in the North-South All-Star Game. He was also named to the All-Lakeland Region 4A on offense and also participated in basketball, baseball, and track throughout high school. Despite all that, Norman received no scholarship offers from any Division I schools.

== College career ==
Norman began college by taking courses at Horry Georgetown Tech while living with his brother, Marrio Norman, who earned a full scholarship in football to Coastal Carolina. The following year in 2008, Norman was offered a spot on the Chanticleers as a walk-on. He eventually graduated with a communications major and dramatic arts minor.

During his true freshman year at Coastal Carolina in 2008, Norman played in all 12 games with 7 starts. During his first start against North Carolina A&T, Norman recorded his first interception. He recorded 26 solo tackles and 35 total tackles, tying for ninth most tackles on the team. He ranked fifth in the Big South with nine pass defenses and two interceptions. He earned Big South Freshman of the Week honors after his seven tackle and one interception performance in a win over Presbyterian. After his freshman year, Coastal Carolina awarded Norman a scholarship.

During his sophomore season, Norman was named a third-team All-American by the Associated Press and made the College Sporting News' "Fabulous Fifty" All-American team. He also earned first-team All-Big South. During the season, he broke the league record and tied for second in the nation with eight interceptions. He ranked third in interceptions per game with 0.73 and led the league with 15 pass breakups, tying eighth nationally with 1.36 per game. He also ranked sixth on the team with 35 tackles and led the team with two blocked kicks. He earned Big South Defensive Player of the Week and National Defensive Player of the Week after tying a Big South record with three interceptions in a game in a win over Gardner-Webb.

During his junior season, Norman again earned 1st team All-Big South. He ranked fifth on the team with 56 tackles and 3rd in the Big South with 9 pass defenses. He also recorded another blocked field goal, bringing him one shy of the Coastal Carolina record. In 2011, Norman was a preseason All-American and All-Big South conference as well as being listed as one of the top 10 defensive backs for 2011 by The Sporting Network. Additionally, he was voted onto the 2011 AFCA Football Championship Subdivision Coaches' All-America Team. For his college career, Norman tied for second in Coastal Carolina history with 11 career interceptions and pass breakups with 23.

== Professional career ==
=== Pre-draft ===
On January 12, 2012, it was announced that Norman had accepted his invitation to play in the East-West Shrine Game. Norman was projected to be a late round pick at the end of his senior season, but began to climb draft boards after impressing scouts during East-West Shrine Game practices. On January 21, 2012, Norman played in the 2012 East-West Shrine Game and was part of the East team that lost 24–17 to the West. On January 26, 2012, Norman accepted an invitation to play in the 2012 Senior Bowl as a late-replacement after Alfonzo Dennard sustained an injury. Norman continued to impress coaches and scouts by intercepting six passes during Senior Bowl practices, although he was a late-replacement and had minimal time to practice with his team. On January 28, 2012, he played in the 2012 Senior Bowl as part of Minnesota Vikings head coach Leslie Frazier's North team that defeated the South 23–13.

External videos
- Josh Norman’s NFL Combine Workout

He attended the NFL Scouting Combine in Indianapolis and completed all of the combine drills. His mediocre performance in the 40-yard dash (4.66s) possibly resulted in a fall in his draft stock. On March 27, 2012, Norman participated at Coastal Carolina's pro day and chose to perform combine and positional drills. He improved his time in the 40-yard dash (4.57s), 20-yard dash (2.63s), and three-cone drill (6.92s). Norman attended a pre-draft visit with the Detroit Lions. It was reported that team representatives and scouts from 27 NFL teams attended Coastal Carolina's pro day. At the conclusion of the pre-draft process, Norman's draft projections varied from as early as the third round to as late as the seventh round by NFL draft experts and scouts. The majority of NFL draft experts projected Norman to be a third or fourth round pick. He was ranked the eighth best cornerback prospect in the draft by NFL analyst Mike Mayock, 10th best by Scouts Inc., 28th best CBS Sports, and 29th best by DraftScout.com.

Pre-draft measurables
Height	Weight	Arm length	Hand span	40-yard dash	10-yard split	20-yard split	20-yard shuttle	Three-cone drill	Vertical jump	Broad jump	Bench press
6 ft 0 1/4 in (1.84 m)	197 lb (89 kg)	32 3/4 in (0.83 m)	9 1/4 in (0.23 m)	4.57 s	1.62 s	2.63 s	4.23 s	6.92 s	33 in (0.84 m)	10 ft 4 in (3.15 m)	14 reps
All values from NFL Combine or Coastal Carolina Pro Day

=== Carolina Panthers (first stint) ===
==== 2012 season ====
The Carolina Panthers selected Norman in the fifth round, 143rd overall, of the 2012 NFL draft. Norman was the 14th cornerback drafted in 2012 and became only the third player to be drafted from Coastal Carolina, after Tyler Thigpen (2007) and Jerome Simpson (2008).

On May 10, 2012, Norman signed his four-year rookie contract with the Panthers, worth US$2.3 million. Throughout training camp, Norman competed to be a starting cornerback against Captain Munnerlyn and Brandon Hogan. Head coach Ron Rivera named Norman and Chris Gamble the starting cornerbacks to begin the regular season.

He made his professional regular season debut and first career start in the Panthers' at the Tampa Bay Buccaneers and recorded four combined tackles during their 16–10 loss. In Week 3, he collected a season-high 11 combined tackles (eight solo) and a pass deflection during a 36–7 loss to the New York Giants. Norman became a focal point of the secondary after the Panthers placed Chris Gamble on injured reserve due to a shoulder injury on October 22, 2012. On October 28, 2012, Norman recorded five combined tackles, deflected a pass, and made his first career interception in the Panthers’ 23–22 loss at the Chicago Bears in Week 8. Norman intercepted a pass by Bears’ quarterback Jay Cutler, that was originally intended for wide receiver Brandon Marshall, during the first quarter. Norman began to struggle towards the end of his rookie season and was eventually surpassed on the depth chart by Josh Thomas and was relegated to a backup cornerback beginning in Week 14. In Week 15, Norman was surpassed on the depth chart by James Dockery and became the fourth cornerback on the depth chart. He finished his rookie season in 2012 with 73 combined tackles (52 solo), seven pass deflections, and one interception in 16 games and 12 starts.

==== 2013 season ====
During training camp, Norman competed against Drayton Florence and Josh Thomas for a job as a starting cornerback. Head coach Ron Rivera named Norman the third cornerback on the depth chart to begin the regular season, behind Captain Munnerlyn and Josh Thomas.

“Apparently, Josh Norman didn't play it. It's a critical situation. You get a communication. You see you have the switch and you fall off looking for the No. 2 receiver to run the No. 7 like he did. You'd like to believe when the call is made you execute the call and you're in position to make the play."

— Ron Rivera
(Regarding Norman’s mistake against the Buffalo Bills)

On September 15, 2013, Norman collected a season-high four combined tackles during the Panthers’ 24–23 loss at the Buffalo Bills. During the fourth quarter, Bills’ quarterback E. J. Manuel threw a two-yard touchdown pass to a wide open Stevie Johnson after a miscommunication between Josh Norman and cornerback D. J. Moore. Moore stated he called for Norman to switch and cover Johnson as Moore covered wide receiver Chris Hogan. Norman stated he didn't hear Moore call for a switch. As a result of the mistake, Norman was effectively benched for the majority of the season. Head coach Ron Rivera benched Norman for three games (Weeks 5–7) as a healthy scratch. He was demoted to being the fifth cornerback on the depth chart behind Captain Munnerlyn, Josh Thomas, Melvin White, and Drayton Florence. Norman was inactive for six of the next nine games (Weeks 9–10, 14–17) as a healthy scratch. Norman finished the 2013 NFL season with four combined tackles (three solo) in seven games and zero starts.

==== 2014 season ====
Despite losing Captain Munnerlyn in free agency to the Vikings as well as Drayton Florence, Norman was not considered the team's first option to start opposite Melvin White to begin the year. Throughout training camp, Norman competed for a roster spot as a backup cornerback against Josh Thomas and James Dockery. He maintained a roster spot after a strong preseason, but was named the fifth cornerback on the depth chart behind Melvin White, Antoine Cason, Bené Benwikere, and Charles Godfrey.

In Week 5, Norman earned his first start of the season, over Melvin White, and recorded three combined tackles in the Panthers’ 31–24 win against the Bears. Norman suffered a concussion during the game and was sidelined for the next two games (Weeks 6–7). In Week 8, Norman became a starting cornerback after surpassing Melvin White and Antoine Cason on the depth chart. On November 16, 2014, Norman collected a season-high seven combined tackles and deflected a pass during a 19–17 loss to the Atlanta Falcons in Week 11. His success facilitated the Panthers to release Cason on December 2, 2014. Norman began to show his potential as a shutdown corner in the second half of the 2014 season while continually covering the opposing team's top receiver. In Week 10, Norman held Philadelphia Eagles wide receiver Jeremy Maclin to three catches for 38-yards and no touchdowns. The following week, he held Falcons’ wide receiver Julio Jones to six receptions for 59-yards and no touchdowns. In Week 15, Norman held rookie Buccaneers wide receiver Mike Evans to two catches for 13-yards and no touchdowns. On December 21, 2014, Norman recorded five combined tackles, deflected a pass, and made an interception during a 17–13 win against the Cleveland Browns in Week 16. He held Browns’ wide receiver Josh Gordon to four catches for 45-yards. Over the final eight weeks of the season, Norman was rated as the 27th best cornerback by Pro Football Focus and gave up only 13 receptions on 33 targets. He finished the season with 48 combined tackles (36 solo), 11 pass deflections, two interceptions, and a forced fumble in 14 games and ten starts. For the season, Norman was targeted 58 times, but only allowed 27 catches for 291 yards and just 74 yards after the catch. The 46.6% catch rate was second best in the NFL among starters behind only Vontae Davis.

The Panthers finished first in the NFC South with a 7–8–1 record and earned a playoff berth. On January 3, 2015, Norman started his first career playoff game and recorded four combined tackles as the Panthers defeated the Arizona Cardinals 27–16 in the NFC Wildcard Game. Norman gave up only one reception for nine-yards during the game. The following week, the Panthers were eliminated from the playoffs after a 31–17 loss at the Seattle Seahawks in the NFC Divisional Round.

==== 2015 season ====
In 2015, Norman picked up where he left off from the 2014 season. During the season opening victory against the Jacksonville Jaguars, Norman was thrown at nine times, allowed just three completions for five yards, and managed to force a fumble and collect a pick-six against quarterback Blake Bortles. Norman followed this up during the Panthers week 2 victory over the Houston Texans where he allowed just 40 yards in coverage on 12 attempts, no first down receptions, while helping to limit DeAndre Hopkins to five receptions and 53 yards for the game. The following week, Norman sealed a 27–22 win against the New Orleans Saints after an interception in the end zone on a pass by Luke McCown intended for Brandin Cooks with a minute remaining in the game. Through the first three weeks of the season, the only two cornerbacks who were targeted 20 or more times and had not allowed a pass for more than 16 yards were Norman and teammate Bené Benwikere. Further, through that span, Norman did not allow 50 yards receiving in a game and quarterbacks generated a 38.8 passer rating when throwing in his direction. For his efforts, Norman was named the NFC's defensive player of the month for September. The following week, in a 37–24 victory over the Buccaneers, Norman became the first cornerback since Charles Woodson in 2008 with 2 INT-TDs in the first 4 weeks of a season. Against the Buccaneers, Norman was targeted 8 times and allowed only two receptions for 31 yards, while recording 2 interceptions and 2 pass defenses. Further, Jameis Winston had a 3.6 quarterback passer rating when targeting Norman. He was named the NFC Defensive Player of the Week for his performance.

Through the first four weeks of the season, Norman had been targeted 35 times and allowed a 42.9% completion percentage for 129 yards to go along with 4 interceptions. During this time, opposing quarterbacks recorded a 23.1 quarterback passer rating when targeting Norman, which ranked first in the NFL above Darrelle Revis, who allowed a 23.9 quarterback passer rating when targeted during this same time. During a Week 6 victory over the Seahawks Norman was only targeted twice for −2 yards both on screen passes. After the game Norman said of Russell Wilson, "He was the smartest quarterback we've played so far this year because of that."

Through the first six weeks of the season, Norman allowed just 46 percent of those 37 passes to be caught and opposing passers throwing his way had a passer rating of just 24.1, the best mark in the NFL. Additionally, he allowed just 17 receptions for 127 yards (7.5 per catch). During the Panthers Week 7 victory over the Eagles, Norman recorded 3 tackles, 2 pass deflections and gave up 1 catch for 3 yards in coverage. Through the first 7 weeks, Norman graded as Pro Football Focus's best cornerback in the NFL. Norman went up against T. Y. Hilton during a rainy Monday night victory over the Indianapolis Colts. He gave up only one catch on three targets for 15 yards. After the game Norman said "I was the Dark Knight today – I was Batman. ... Had to come in and save a couple people." During the Panthers' 44–16 victory over the Washington Redskins to move them to 10–0, Norman had 4 solo tackles and forced a key fumble. During the Panthers' 33–14 victory over the Dallas Cowboys on Thanksgiving, Norman shadowed Dez Bryant on Bryant's 43 snaps on the perimeter and limited him to one catch for 6 yards. During the Panthers Week 14 victory over the Falcons, when matched up with Julio Jones, Norman limited him to four catches on six targets for 33 yards. Over the first 14 weeks of the season, Norman held DeAndre Hopkins, Mike Evans, T. Y. Hilton, Dez Bryant, and Julio Jones to a combined 9 receptions for 89 yards.

During the Panthers' Week 15 game, which resulted in a 38–35 victory over the Giants, Norman had a high-profile contest with receiver Odell Beckham Jr. During the game, Norman was targeted 6 times when matched up with Beckham and gave up 4 receptions for 30 yards and a touchdown. Tempers flared between the two players with Norman committing 2 personal fouls and Beckham committing 3 personal fouls, which included a hit to the head of a defenseless Norman that later resulted in a 1-game suspension for Beckham. The clash with Beckham caused the NFL to implement a new rule for the following season where two unsportsmanlike conduct fouls in the same game warrant an automatic ejection. Norman was selected for his first career Pro Bowl during the season. On December 23, 2015, Norman was fined a combined $26,044 for a face mask penalty, and for striking an opponent in the head against the Giants. During the final game of the regular season, Norman held Mike Evans to 15 yards from 1 catch on 5 targets.

For the season, opposing quarterbacks had a passer rating of 54.0 when throwing at Norman, the lowest rating allowed by all NFL corners. Norman recorded 56 tackles, 18 passes defended, 4 interceptions, 3 forced fumbles, 2 fumble recoveries and helped the Panthers win a team-record 15 games for the 2015 season. In the Divisional round against the Seahawks, Norman recorded 5 tackles and 1 sack. He helped the Panthers defeat the Seahawks 31–24. In the NFC Championship game against the Arizona Cardinals, Norman recorded 2 tackles and 2 passes defended as the Panthers defeated the Cardinals 49–15 to advance to Super Bowl 50. In the Super Bowl, Norman recorded 2 tackles and 2 passes defensed. However, the Panthers fell to the Denver Broncos by a score of 24–10.

Norman was named First-team All-Pro for the 2015 season and was ranked 11th on the NFL Top 100 Players of 2016.

On April 20, 2016, the Panthers rescinded their franchise tag that they placed on Norman, after he and the team failed to come to an agreement on a new contract, making him an unrestricted free agent.

=== Washington Redskins ===
==== 2016 season ====
On April 22, 2016, Norman signed a five-year, $75 million deal with the Redskins. The contract made him the highest paid cornerback in NFL history at the time, surpassing the contract Darrelle Revis signed with the New York Jets in 2015. During the team's training camp, Norman announced that he would appear regularly during that season's Fox NFL broadcast. In Week 3, Norman faced off against Odell Beckham Jr. and the Giants, which generated media attention due to their previous controversial matchup in 2015; during the 29-27 win he managed to get Giants center Weston Richburg ejected under the new unsportsmanlike conduct foul rule simply by running past Richburg in pursuit of Beckham, who had the football at the time. He recorded his first interception as a Redskin against quarterback Cody Kessler in the Week 4 win over the Browns. In a Week 16 win against the Bears, he recorded two interceptions on quarterback Matt Barkley. He started in every game during the season, finishing with 67 tackles, 19 passes defended, two forced fumbles, and three interceptions. After the season, he was ranked as the 59th best player by his peers in the NFL Top 100 Players of 2017.

==== 2017 season ====
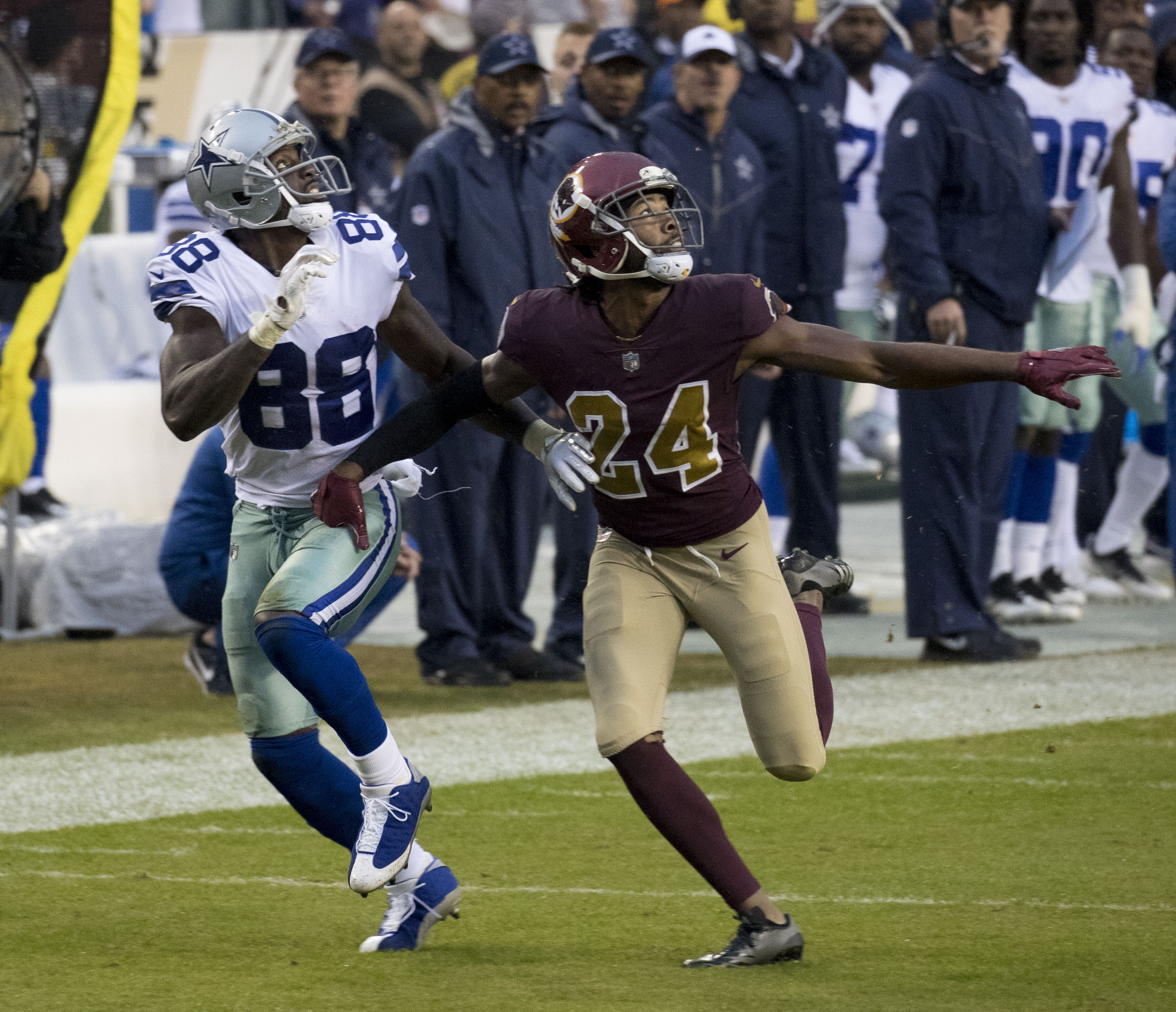
Norman covering Dallas Cowboys wide receiver Dez Bryant in 2017

In the Week 2 game against the Los Angeles Rams, Norman forced a fumble off of running back Todd Gurley. The fumble set up the Redskins' offense on an eventual field goal scoring drive in the 27–20 victory. During a Week 4 game against the Kansas City Chiefs, Norman suffered injuries to his lung lining and a fractured rib after tackling wide receiver Chris Conley in the second quarter. Norman did not return to the game, and was ruled out for a few weeks following further examination after the game. He finished the 2017 season with 64 total tackles (47 solo), nine passes defended, two forced fumbles, and one fumble recovery.

==== 2018 season ====
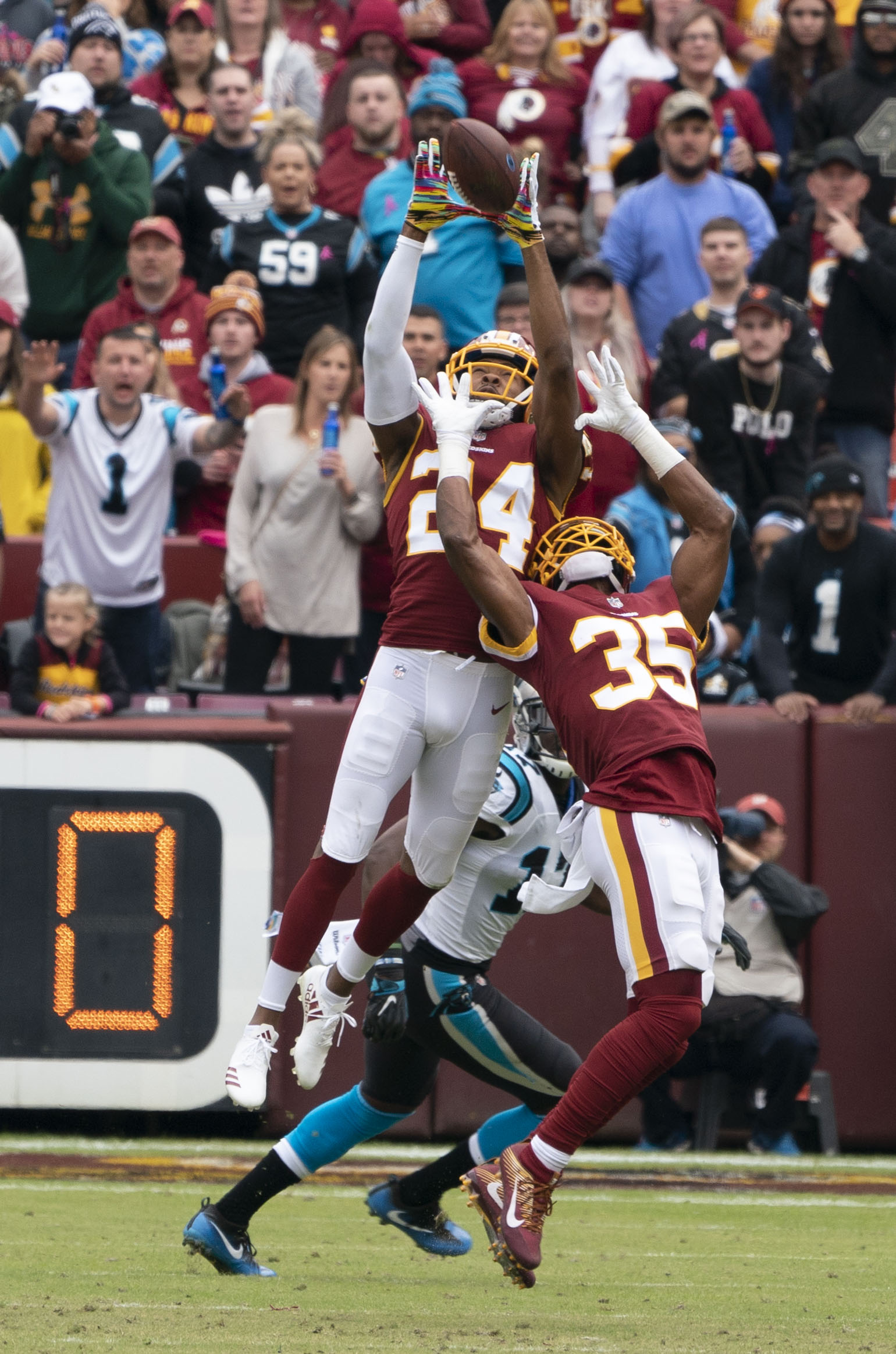
Norman making an interception against the Panthers in 2018

In Week 5 against the Saints, Norman was benched after allowing a 62-yard touchdown reception to Tre'Quan Smith, but eventually came back in the second half as the Redskins lost the game 43–19. In Week 6 against the Panthers, his former team, Norman intercepted quarterback Cam Newton and forced a fumble off of rookie wide receiver D. J. Moore. In Week 10 against the Buccaneers, he intercepted quarterback Ryan Fitzpatrick in a 16–3 win. Three weeks later, Norman recorded an interception against quarterback Carson Wentz in a 28–13 loss to the Eagles, his third interception of the season. He finished the 2018 season with 64 tackles (40 solo), three interceptions, nine passes defended, three forced fumbles, and one fumble recovery.

==== 2019 season ====
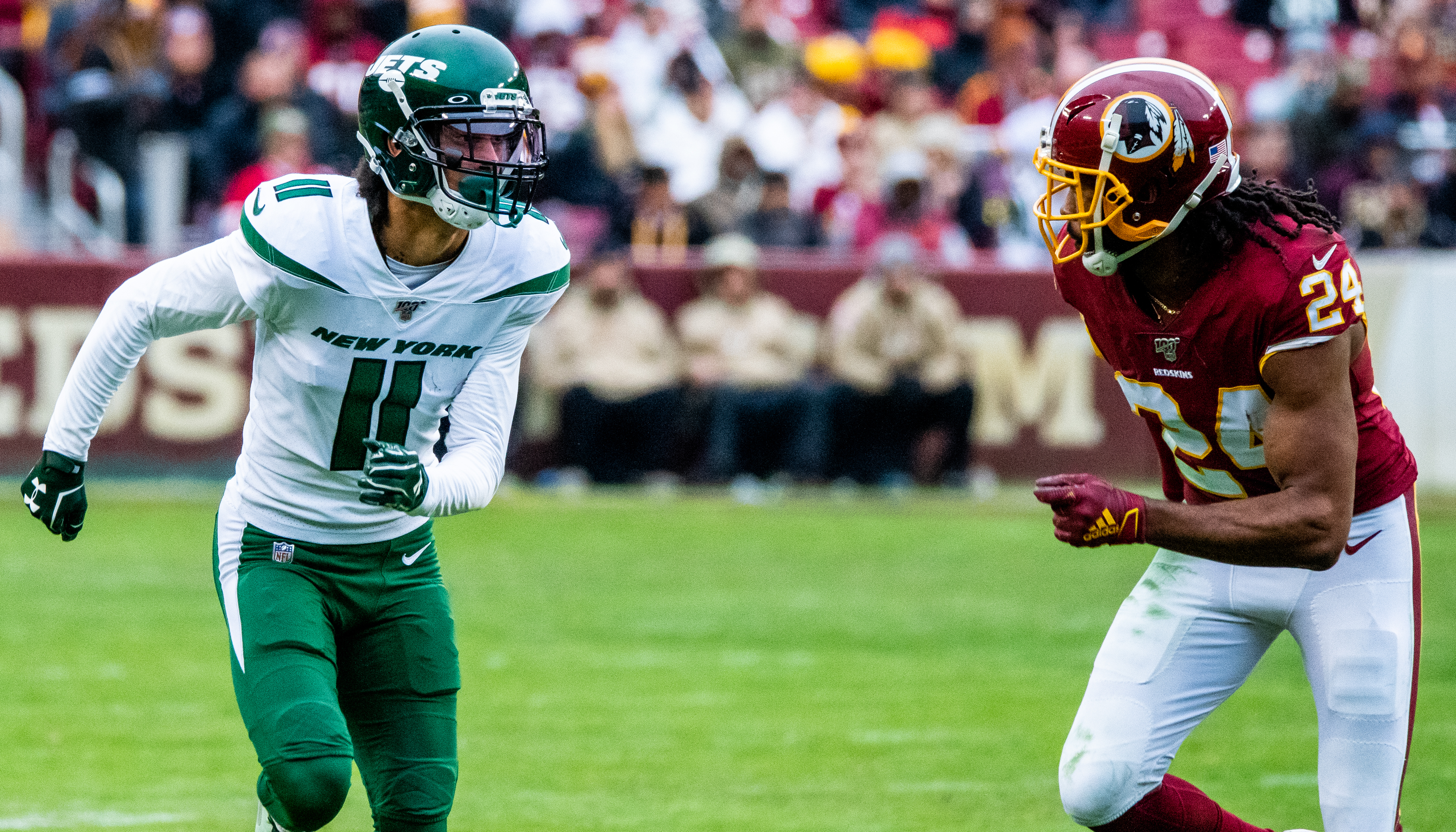
Norman in a game against the New York Jets

In Week 3 against the Bears, Norman sacked Mitchell Trubisky once and recorded his first interception of the season off a pass from Trubisky intended for Allen Robinson in the endzone as the Redskins lost 31–15. Due to poor performance, interim head coach Bill Callahan made the decision to replace Norman as a starter with Fabian Moreau for the Week 12 game against the Detroit Lions. Norman would play a reserve role taking snaps on special teams. He finished the 2019 season with one sack, 40 total tackles (33 solo), one interception, and six passes defended.

On February 14, 2020, Norman was released by the Redskins following the hiring of Ron Rivera as the team's new general manager/head coach.

=== Buffalo Bills (first stint) ===
In March 2020, the Bills signed Norman to a one-year, $6 million contract that includes $3 million guaranteed and a signing bonus of $1.50 million. He was placed on injured reserve on September 12, 2020, and was activated on October 3, 2020. In his debut with the Bills against the Las Vegas Raiders, Norman entered in place of injured starter Levi Wallace. Norman forced a fumble on Raiders tight end Darren Waller in the fourth quarter and recovered the football himself, setting up a touchdown drive to seal the game as Buffalo won 30–23. Norman was placed on the reserve/COVID-19 list by the team after testing positive for the virus on November 14, and activated on November 24. In Week 17 against the Miami Dolphins, Norman recorded his first interception as a Bill off a pass thrown by Tua Tagovailoa and returned it for a 16-yard touchdown during the 56–26 win. He finished the 2020 season with 24 total tackles (21 solo), one interception, four passes defended, one forced fumble, and two fumble recoveries.

=== San Francisco 49ers ===
On September 6, 2021, Norman was signed by the San Francisco 49ers. He had seven forced fumbles on the year, a career high.

=== Carolina Panthers (second stint) ===
On December 26, 2022, the Panthers signed Norman to their practice squad. Norman played in the Panthers' final two games of the season, recording eight tackles. Carolina finished 7–10, second in the NFC South and one game behind division champion Tampa Bay. His practice squad contract with the team expired after the season on January 8, 2023.

=== Buffalo Bills (second stint) ===
On October 10, 2023, Norman was signed to the Bills practice squad. His contract expired when the team's season ended on January 21, 2024.

== NFL career statistics ==
=== Regular season ===
Year	Team	Games		Tackles				Interceptions						Fumbles	
Year	Team	GP	GS	Cmb	Solo	Ast	Sck	PD	Int	Yds	Avg	Lng	TD	FF	FR
2012	CAR	16	12	73	52	21	0.0	7	1	2	2.0	2	0	0	0
2013	CAR	7	0	4	3	1	0.0	0	0	0	0.0	0	0	0	0
2014	CAR	14	10	48	36	12	0.0	11	2	60	30.0	33	0	1	1
2015	CAR	16	16	56	48	8	0.0	18	4	110	27.5	46	2	3	2
2016	WAS	16	16	67	52	15	0.0	19	3	38	12.7	35	0	2	0
2017	WAS	14	14	64	47	17	0.0	9	0	0	0.0	0	0	2	1
2018	WAS	16	16	64	40	24	0.0	9	3	79	26.3	40	0	3	1
2019	WAS	12	8	40	33	7	1.0	6	1	2	1.0	2	0	1	0
2020	BUF	9	3	24	21	3	0.0	4	1	16	16.0	16	1	1	2
2021	SF	15	14	49	36	13	0.0	5	1	40	40.0	40	0	7	0
2022	CAR	2	1	8	6	2	0.0	0	0	0	0.0	0	0	0	0
2023	BUF	4	0	4	3	1	0.0	0	0	0	0.0	0	0	0	0
Career		141	110	501	377	124	1.0	88	16	347	21.7	46	3	20	7

=== Postseason ===
Year	Team	Games		Tackles				Interceptions						Fumbles	
Year	Team	GP	GS	Cmb	Solo	Ast	Sck	PD	Int	Yds	Avg	Lng	TD	FF	FR
2014	CAR	2	2	6	4	2	0.0	0	0	0	0.0	0	0	0	0
2015	CAR	3	3	9	6	3	1.0	4	0	0	0.0	0	0	0	0
2020	BUF	3	0	6	4	2	0.0	0	0	0	0.0	0	0	1	0
2021	SF	3	0	2	2	0	0.0	0	0	0	0.0	0	0	0	0
2023	BUF	1	0	0	0	0	0.0	0	0	0	0.0	0	0	0	0
Career		12	5	23	16	7	1.0	4	0	0	0.0	0	0	1	0

== Personal life ==
Norman is part Native American through both his father and mother. During his time with the Redskins, Norman appeared in several local car dealership commercials alongside Kirk Cousins and Ryan Kerrigan. In September 2017, Norman donated $100,000 to the recovery efforts following the devastation Puerto Rico received after Hurricane Maria impacted the country earlier that month.

In 2018, Norman appeared on season 26 of the American television show Dancing with the Stars. He was partnered with professional dancer Sharna Burgess, where he eventually progressed to the finals, finishing as the runner-up behind figure skater Adam Rippon. Norman also participated in a televised celebrity softball game during the 2018 Major League Baseball All-Star Game event week. Norman is a keen soccer fan and he supports Manchester United and Paris Saint-Germain.

During the George Floyd protests in 2020, Norman and New Orleans Saints linebacker Demario Davis attended Buffalo mayor Byron Brown's press conference announcing changes to the Buffalo Police Department following an incident between protesters and police in downtown Buffalo.
