= Kelcy Quarles =

American football player (born 1992)

No. 73
- Position: Defensive tackle

Personal information
- Born: January 23, 1992 (age 34); Hodges, South Carolina, U.S.
- Listed height: 6 ft 4 in (1.93 m)
- Listed weight: 310 lb (141 kg)

Career information
- High school: Greenwood (Greenwood, South Carolina)
- College: South Carolina
- NFL draft: 2014: undrafted

Career history
- New York Giants (2014)*; New England Patriots (2014)*; Indianapolis Colts (2014–2015); Cleveland Browns (2015)*; New England Patriots (2015)*; Indianapolis Colts (2015–2016); Calgary Stampeders (2018)*; Edmonton Eskimos (2019)*; Saskatchewan Roughriders (2020–2021)*
- * Offseason or practice squad member only

Awards and highlights
- First-team All-American (2013); First-team All-SEC (2013)

Career NFL statistics
- Total tackles: 1
- Sacks: 1
- Pass deflections: 1
- Stats at Pro Football Reference

Kelcy Quarles (born January 23, 1992) is an American former professional football player who was a defensive tackle in the National Football League (NFL). He played college football for the South Carolina Gamecocks, and was signed by the New York Giants as an undrafted free agent in 2014. Quarles was also a member of the New England Patriots, Indianapolis Colts, Cleveland Browns, Calgary Stampeders, Edmonton Eskimos, and Saskatchewan Roughriders.

== College career ==
As a junior in 2013, Quarles was a first-team All-Southeastern Conference (SEC) and second-team All-American selection. and was a first-team All-American selection by The Sporting News.

== Professional career ==
=== New York Giants ===
On May 10, 2014, Quarles signed with the New York Giants as an undrafted free agent.

=== New England Patriots (first stint) ===
On August 31, 2014, the New England Patriots claimed Quarles off waivers from the Giants.

=== Indianapolis Colts (first stint) ===
On September 16, 2014, the Indianapolis Colts signed Quarles from the New England Patriots practice squad. In his first NFL game he recorded a sack. He was waived on November 24, 2014, and re-signed to the practice squad on November 25. On September 5, 2015, Quarles was waived by the Colts.

=== New England Patriots (second stint) ===
The New England Patriots signed Quarles back to their practice squad on December 2, 2015. They released him on December 15, 2015.

=== Indianapolis Colts (second stint) ===
On December 18, 2015, the Indianapolis Colts announced they had signed Quarles to their practice squad. He was elevated to the active roster on December 21.

On September 3, 2016, he was waived by the Colts as part of final roster cuts. On September 4, 2016, he was signed to the Colts practice squad. Quarles was released on September 13. He was re-signed to the practice squad on October 19, 2016. He was released by the Colts on December 2, 2016. He was re-signed back to the practice squad on December 20, 2016.

=== Calgary Stampeders ===
Quarles signed with the Calgary Stampeders of the CFL on January 19, 2018. He was released before the start of the regular season on June 10.

=== Edmonton Eskimos ===
Quarles signed a futures contract with the Edmonton Eskimos on November 9, 2018. He spent the 2019 season on the team's practice roster.

=== Saskatchewan Roughriders ===
Quarles signed a futures contract with the Saskatchewan Roughriders on November 1, 2019. He was released on February 17, 2021.

== Personal life ==
Quarles is the nephew of Patriots Hall of Fame tight end Ben Coates. It is through his mother, Mattie Quarles (née Coates) that he is related to Coates.

Quarles' father, Buddy Quarles, played for the South Carolina Gamecocks for coach Joe Morrison from 1984 to 1987 as an offensive lineman. Quarles initially played as an offensive lineman before switching to defensive around eight grade, however Buddy continued to teach him the tips and tricks of offensive linemen so that he would know what to look for.
