= Cedric Mack =

American football player (born 1960)

No. 47, 40
- Position: Cornerback

Personal information
- Born: September 14, 1960 (age 66); Freeport, Texas, U.S.
- Listed height: 6 ft 0 in (1.83 m)
- Listed weight: 193 lb (88 kg)

Career information
- High school: Brazosport (Freeport)
- College: Baylor
- NFL draft: 1983: 2nd round, 44th overall pick

Career history
- St. Louis/Phoenix Cardinals (1983–1990); San Diego Chargers (1991); Kansas City Chiefs (1992); New Orleans Saints (1992-1993)

Career NFL statistics
- Interceptions: 20
- Fumble recoveries: 7
- Touchdowns: 1
- Stats at Pro Football Reference

Cedric Manuel Mack (born September 14, 1960) is an American former professional football player who was a cornerback in the National Football League (NFL) for the St. Louis/Phoenix Cardinals, San Diego Chargers, Kansas City Chiefs, and the New Orleans Saints. He played football at Brazosport High School before playing college football for the Baylor Bears.

Mack is currently a high school coach and math teacher at Ridge Point High School in Houston, Texas.
