= Judson Freeman Ayers Jr. =

American politician (1933–2013)

Member of the South Carolina House of Representatives
- In office 1965–???

Personal details
- Born: March 17, 1933
- Died: November 9, 2013 (aged 80)
- Education: University of South Carolina; University of Virginia School of Law

Judson Freeman Ayers Jr. (March 17, 1933 – November 9, 2013) was an American politician. He served as a member of the South Carolina House of Representatives.

== Life and career ==
Ayers attended Greenwood High School, the University of South Carolina and the University of Virginia School of Law.

In 1965, Ayers was elected to the South Carolina House of Representatives, representing Greenwood County, South Carolina.

Ayers died in November 2013, at the age of 80.
