= Randon Fontenette =

American football player (born 2005)

No. 7 – Colorado Buffaloes
- Position: Safety
- Class: Senior

Personal information
- Born: July 5, 2005 (age 21)
- Listed height: 6 ft 2 in (1.88 m)
- Listed weight: 220 lb (100 kg)

Career information
- High school: Brazosport (Freeport, Texas)
- College: TCU (2023); Vanderbilt (2024–2025); Colorado (2026–present)
- Stats at ESPN

Randon Fontenette (born July 5, 2005) is an American college football safety for the Colorado Buffaloes. He previously played for the TCU Horned Frogs and Vanderbilt Commodores.

== Early life ==
Fontenette attended Brazosport High School in Freeport, Texas, where he played football and basketball. He played both quarterback and safety in high school. He was the District 12-4A D-I Offensive MVP his junior year after passing for 1,440 yards with 21 touchdowns and rushing for 1,066 yards with 12 touchdowns. He had 32 tackles and two interceptions on defense. As a senior, Fontenette passed for over 1,000 yards with nine touchdowns, 1,024 rushing yards with 14 touchdowns on offense and 82 tackles with four interceptions on defense. He committed to Texas Christian University (TCU) to play college football.

== College career ==
Fontenette played in all 12 games his lone season at TCU in 2023 and had 16 tackles. After the season, he entered the transfer portal and committed to Vanderbilt University. In two seasons at Vanderbilt, he started 24 of 25 games, recording 124 tackles, 3.5 sacks and one interception he returned for a touchdown. Fontenette entered the transfer portal again after the 2025 season and committed to the University of Colorado Boulder. He entered the 2026 season as a starter.
