= Port Freeport =

- Interactive map of Port Freeport

Location
- Country: United States
- Location: Freeport, Texas
- Coordinates: 28°56′30.1″N 95°20′44.4″W
- UN/LOCODE: USFPO

Details
- Opened: 1925
- Operated by: Port Freeport
- Owned by: Public Entity, Governing Body

Statistics
- Website portfreeport.com

Port Freeport (formally Brazos Harbor Navigation District of Brazoria County) is the geographically smallest deep-water seaport along the U.S Gulf Coast. Located in Freeport, Texas (United States), it has rail access, and both private and public facilities. It is ranked 10th in the nation for chemicals, 19th in the nation for total tonnage, 26th in the nation for container traffic, and handles over 100,000 vehicles per year and more than 1,000 ships per year. Forbes magazine (2017) ranked Port Freeport as one of the top 10 fastest growing seaports for exports in the U.S.

== History ==
=== Pre-1925 ===
This section covers the early history of the Brazos River from the time Texas was founded until the current entity was formed in 1925. When Stephen F. Austin landed on the Texas coast in 1825 at the mouth of the Brazos River, there was no deep channel or rock jetty, just a river flowing into the Gulf of Mexico.

==== Report of Chief of Engineers ====
A report from the U.S. Army, describes the Brazos river as "one of the principal rivers in Texas. Its length is about 800 miles, and its watershed embraces about 36,000 square miles." "Unlike any other Texas river, the Brazos flows directly into the Gulf of Mexico without the intervention of a bay."

In the late 19th century, work began on a set of jetties. They were not completed until 1900, as the project switched from being sponsored federally to privately and back again.

==== 1866 ====
The Brazos Internal Improvement and Navigation Company was chartered by the legislature of Texas for the purpose of deepening the channel over the bar and improving the river, but after various unsuccessful efforts to secure a subsidy from the state the project was abandoned around 1874.

==== 1880 ====
The United States Army Corps of Engineers proposed spending $40,000 to remove the sand bar and add palmetto pilings. Congress approved the budget. However, later that year, the Corps amended their proposal to build two parallel jetties of brush, stone and concrete instead of piles at an estimated cost of $522,890. Work began in 1881 and continued until 1886, when operations were suspended for lack of federal funds. At this time, only the northern (or eastern) jetty was partially complete, along with part of the base of the southern jetty.

==== 1887 ====
A survey indicated that wave actions and subsidence may have contributed to the loss of a considerable amount of the north jetty. The officer in charge, Major O.H. Ernst, opined that money would be better spent deepening the Galveston and Brazos Canal, a canal that connected Port Velasco to Galveston, a forerunner of the Intracoastal Waterway. He recommended work on the jetties at the Brazos River be abandoned.

==== 1888 ====
===== The Brazos River Channel and Dock Company =====
In February 1888 while federal representatives were preparing to abandon their project, the Texas Legislature added statutes creating the Brazos River Channel and Dock Company for the purpose of constructing, owning, and operating a deep-water channel into the Gulf of Mexico; and for constructing, owning, and operating docks in connection with such channels. Their authority extended "as far as necessary to reach a place of its docks that will afford security from cyclones, storms, swells, and tidal waves, with such depth as may suit its convenience and the wants of navigation, not less than 10 feet, and a width of not less than 40 feet." They were authorized to charge and collect tolls "not to exceed 1 cent per barrel bulk of the capacity of each vessel going either way."

==== Velasco ====
Port Velasco officially opened in July 1891 and was the predecessor to Port Freeport. Velasco was the settlement originally located at the mouth of the Brazos River near modern day Surfside. After an early storm destroyed Velasco, the settlement was moved upriver and rebuilt. Port Velasco was an early port of commerce for Texas but was hampered by silting at the mouth of the Brazos River. Later, around 1957, the town of Velasco merged with the town of Freeport to form a single community.

In 1899 the Secretary of War deemed the maintenance of the river mouth “of sufficient public interest to justify the United States to [take over and] complete the works of the Brazos River Channel and Dock Company.” He approved $85,000 in funding for improvements to the river, provided the Brazos River Channel and Dock Company transferred all interest to the United States Government. This project resulted in channel 18 feet deep and 150 feet wide and removed any private interest from owning or operating the channel.

Products that were initially moved through the port were agricultural in nature; mostly cotton. In the early 1900s sulfur mines were common in southern Brazoria County, near Velasco and Freeport. The Freeport Sulphur Company was established in 1912 with mining interests in the area that utilized the channel for exporting product and was the original heavy industry to begin developing the area.

Spring floods impacted the river causing silting near the mouth so there was a continual need for dredging to keep commerce viable. Another major feature of the Brazos River is that it empties directly into the Gulf of Mexico without crossing a bay or estuary. This is important from both a maintenance and ecological viewpoint.

=== Post-1925 ===
Port Freeport was officially created as a governing entity in 1925. Port Freeport, originally known as the Brazos River Harbor Navigation District of Brazoria County, is a Special District created under the Texas Constitution by the legislature in 1925 and approved by the citizens of Brazoria County. Port Freeport is a local government entity that is governed by a board of commissioners elected by the voters of the district.

Port Freeport is a taxing authority with the power to issue bonds “for improving the inland and coastal waters, and for the preservation and conservation of inland and coastal waters for navigation … and that all property, real and personal, situated within the district and subject to taxation will be benefitted by the improvements to be constructed by the District” (Section 59, Article 16, Texas Constitution) The port collects taxes for two purposes, to develop and improve waterways and facilities, and to maintain said waterways and [public] facilities.

Following enactment of a statute in 1925 by the Texas legislature providing that a district might be established from parts or all of one or two counties for the purpose of improvement of harbor or navigable streams, in December 1925 The Brazos River Harbor Navigation district was created by a vote of people of the district that was established.. The district established encompasses Four-Fifths of Brazorla County. (Freeport Facts, 1949)

A $1,000,000 in Bonds Voted accompanied the vote for district creation. The purpose of the bond issue was primarily for the Improvement and deepening of the harbor at the mouth of the Brazos River. (Freeport Facts, 1949) This bond was matched by the federal government which directed the Corps of Engineers to begin a project to protect the harbor by diverting the mouth of the Brazos River over five miles from the existing rock jetties.

When completed, it created a protected harbor for shipping and a base for economic development. It also created the unique situation of the Brazos River being the only river in the United States with two mouths.

==== Early Projects ====
The first notable project of the Navigation District was the relocation of the Brazos River which was completed by the U.S. Army Corps of Engineers to control flooding in the town of Velasco and Freeport and provide a protected harbor for the fledgling shipping industry that supported sulfur mining in the area. Moving a river was a considerable task. Almost all the dirt work was done by mule powered equipment, as the diversion channel was dug in dry ground before being opened to the river water. One of the results of this project was the Highway 36 bridge leading into Freeport being built over dry ground then having the channel dug under it.

Later, the main channel (also known as the Old Brazos River) was expanded from 18 feet deep to a depth of 38 feet by 300 feet wide, and extended into the Gulf of Mexico for seven miles. This provided a more stable channel for ships calling on Port Freeport which primarily carried sulfur, crude oil for the inland refineries, and the new chemical market that developed during World War II.

In the early 1950s a public dry cargo terminal was built and operated by the Brazos River Navigation District of Brazoria County. This has evolved into the current facility located in the city of Freeport which houses various tenants such as American Rice, Dole, Del Monte, Chiquita and Horizon Terminals as well as a dozen stevedoring companies.

==== Modern Projects ====
- In 1970 the River and Harbor Act authorized the new depth of the channel to be 45 feet with dredging completed in the late 1980s. This was primarily to accommodate larger tankers needed for importing crude oil.
- In the early 1990s the North Jetty was relocated to create a wider channel entrance.
- In the early 2000s the entry channel was expanded again to accommodate larger liquified gas vessels.
- In 2014
  - Port Freeport obtained Congressional approval to further expand and deepen the channel to handle larger ships.
  - Two ship to shore (STS) cranes were added for moving containerized cargo.
- In 2018 public supported bonds were passed to support this specific project. However, US Army Corps of Engineers delayed work until 2020, and the actual work began in 2021.
- In 2021 the US Army Corps of Engineers broke the overall dredging project into four segments (referred to as reaches) and issued a dredging contract to begin with Reach 3, a segment of river closest to and directly supporting the container dock. That segment of river was dredged to a depth of 51 feet in 2021.
- In 2022 a contract was issued for Reach 2, a segment of river that has a tight turn with heavy industry on both sides of the channel.

== Size ==
The navigation district of Port Freeport within Brazoria County is large. The boundaries are roughly from the Southwest corner of Brazoria county at the intersection of the shoreline and Matagorda County line extending eastward along the shore to Chocolate Bayou. Following Chocolate Bayou northward it crosses most of the county until it reaches a point at County Road 69 (Manvel-Sandy Point Rd, near the town of Iowa Colony), then travels west along County Road 69 to the Fort Bend county line and follows that line west to the Brazos River, then south along the river and western Brazoria County line from Fort Bend County along Matagorda County back to the Gulf of Mexico. It covers about 1187 square miles, or 87% of Brazoria County. Many people often mistakenly assume the navigation district is limited to the City of Freeport.

== Jurisdiction ==
Port Freeport has authority over all waterways within the district (Texas Water Code 60.043); it may fix fees, charges or tolls for their use as well as control the operation of vessels using these waters.

== Governance ==
Each port in Texas state is governed by its own commission, which acts as a board of directors for the port. Some commissions are elected by citizens in the port district and may consist of three or five commissioners. Some commissions are appointed by other elected offices such as county commissions or city councils, or a combination of those. Some ports commissioners are appointed by various jurisdictions which may include a single city government, such as Galveston, a combination of cities and counties such as Houston (Port of Houston), or just county governments such as Corpus Christi (Port of Corpus Christi. About half of the port commissions in Texas are elected. Most elected port commissioners serve a six-year term.

Port Freeport is governed by six commissioners elected by voters within the district – not appointed like some of the other ports within the state. Commissioners serve six-year terms. The board reconstitutes itself every election cycle with restrictions on offices. Each election cycle the board, including any newly elected members, vote on a slate of officers. No commissioner holds the same office for two consecutive terms. Although the district is divided into four precincts each commissioner is elected by a district wide vote. Five of the six positions are associated with a specific precinct and one position is "at-large" with two commissioners sharing a precinct. There is no information given as to how this structure was developed.

Port Freeport (AKA Brazos Harbor Navigation District) was originally structured with only three elected commissioners. This structure remained in place from 1925 to about 1960 when port officials petitioned the state legislature to increase the number of commissioners to six.

=== Population ===
As a Deep-Draft port, Freeport complements, and competes with, other ports along the Gulf Coast in handling exports, import and coastwise shipping helping to propel Texas into the 10th largest economy in the world. Publicly owned and operated deep-draft warehousing and terminal facilities for general cargo are located in the Brazos Harbor Turning Basin. Foreign trade and interstate commerce are primary functions of the Port.

The population of Brazoria county was 76,000 in 1960; 108,000 in 1970 and is 346,300 in 2015, 374,264 in 2019, 379,641 in 2020. This is a growth rate of 22.45% since 2010.

== Value ==
Typically, large scale infrastructures and public investments have their value measured by their effect on commerce, employment, or incomes, and is referred to as economic impact. Every few years Port Freeport commissions a study to value the economic impact on the community as a part of evaluating the performance of the organization.

Studies at Port Freeport look at seaport activity, values of imports/exports, business revenue, payroll, direct jobs, re-spending, local purchases, induced jobs, and indirect jobs. These measures allow analysts to measure economic impact.

A study conducted in 1970 identified the economic impact at $1.7 Billion and projected it to reach $7.2 Billion by 2000. Per capita income was measured at $3,200 and projected to reach $5,570 by 2000.

A study published in 2012 reviewed the state-wide impact of Port Freeport and concluded it impacted over 66,000 jobs and brought revenues of over $17.9 Billion into the Texas economy. (Martin & Associates, 2012)

A study conducted in 2016 by Texas A&M Transportation Institute updated this assessment to 150,651 jobs statewide and $98.8 Billion into the Texas economy. Supplemental to the local and state impacts, researchers also estimate Port Freeport contributes about $149 Billion to the national economy.

== Industrial Base ==
Port Velasco preceded Port Freeport by more than a decade. The channel was open to steam ship traffic prior to 1920 and sailing traffic dating back to the late 1800s when ships called on Port Velasco. The primary cargo shipped from Port Velasco was agricultural products from Brazoria county.

=== Freeport Sulphur ===
Formed in 1912 to mine sulfur in the area and ship sulfur from Velasco. It became a valuable asset to the United States during World War I, increasing the area's importance. It was followed in 1916 by the Stauffer Chemical Company which caused economic growth in the area and led to the formation of the City of Freeport.

=== Dow ===
In the late 1930s, Dow Chemical wanted develop a new facility while expanding their magnesium extraction process. Freeport, Texas had everything a chemical company could want - seawater rich in magnesium and bromine, a proximity to natural gas reserves and salt domes, a large harbor and good weather.

Dow officials, including Willard Dow and Dr. A.P. Beutel, studied potential locales from New Orleans, Louisiana down to Brownsville, Texas. Two sites stood above the rest: Corpus Christi and Freeport. Freeport was a small village in the middle of marshland with an easily accessible harbor – it won.

Dow was a major military contractor during WWII with their magnesium extraction process perfected just months prior to the Japanese attack on Peal Harbor. Magnesium is used in flares, bombs, and the manufacture of aircraft. Dow opened its doors here in 1941. (Brandt, 2013)

Dow Chemical has formed the base for almost all other chemical companies in lower Brazoria County as it either provides raw products, or uses products from the many other chemical companies in the area. Dow is also responsible for the existence of the City of Lake Jackson, which was built to house their anticipated workforce. Lake Jackson was one of the first master planned communities in existence.

=== Phillips 66 ===
Due to WWII, the country needed refined petroleum products. In 1941, Phillips Petroleum established a refinery and tank farm in the town of Old Ocean, about 30 miles inland. The location chosen was primarily as protection from enemy naval attack. They connected to the Freeport harbor via pipeline to load ships from their own terminal. 2019 saw the completion and activation of the Phillips 66 NGL facility significantly increasing ship traffic. This led Forbes Magazine to list Port Freeport as one of the top 10 fastest growing ports in the United States.

=== Public Docks ===
In 1953, the Port Authority passed a bond to build public docks and warehouses in order to handle bulk and dry goods. Those docks have evolved into a nearly 400 acre facility used by several import and export companies today. Long term tenants include: Dole Fruit, Rivianna Foods (FKA American Rice), Chiquita Fruit Co., Tenaris, and Horizon Terminal Services.

=== BASF ===
BASF, a German company, partnered with Dow to build a plant in the 1950s. In the early 1990s BASF opened a marine terminal on the river and today is one of the world's largest producers of ammonia.

=== Strategic Petroleum Reserve (SPR) ===
Strategic Petroleum Reserve (SPR) formed in 1975 as defense against oil shortages and resulting economic hardships for the country. The SPR site located on the Brazos River Diversion Channel south of Freeport is the largest of these facilities in the United States with a capacity exceeding 40 Million barrels. SPR is connected via pipelines to other locations in the country and to multiple berths along the Freeport Channel.

=== Enterprise Products ===
Closely associated with the SPR facility is Enterprise Products (Pipeline), which is also a tenant of Port Freeport, operating a crude oil terminal that transfers crude oil, both import and export, for various refineries in addition to the SPR facility.

=== Freeport LNG ===
Freeport LNG was an early entrant to the then emerging U.S. Liquified Natural Gas (LNG) market in the early 2000s. They initially began operations as a gas importer in 2008 supporting cleaner fuels for the US. A major shift in the LNG gas market due primarily to improvements in extracting gas from shale, saw little need for the US to continue importing natural gas. In the early 2010s, Freeport LNG switched their market focus to build export capacity, which led to major investments in their facility. A multi-phase expansion costing more than $25 billion led to Freeport LNG having one of the largest LNG export facilities in the world.

The LNG terminal began commercial operations in April 2008. LNG export capability became operational in 2019.

On June 8, 2022, a fire and explosion occurred as a result of a pipeline rupture, taking the LNG terminal fully offline. The terminal did not fully restart commercial production until 8 months later in February 2023. Because the terminal accounted for about 20% of US LNG exports, and with European countries looking for LNG imports as an alternative to Russian gas since the 2022 Russian invasion of Ukraine, the disruption had a major impact on international gas prices.
