= Alan Weddell =

American football player and coach (born 1950)

Biographical details
- Born: March 12, 1951 (age 75); Freeport, Texas, U.S.

Playing career
- 1970–1972: Texas
- Position: Offensive lineman

Coaching career (HC unless noted)
- 1973–1977: Angleton HS (TX) (assistant)
- 1978–1981: Victoria HS (TX) (assistant)
- 1982–1989: Victoria HS (TX)
- 1990–1997: La Marque HS (TX)
- 1998–2002: Texas A&M (ILB)
- 2004: Brazoswood HS (DC)
- 2005: Houston (LB)
- 2006–2007: Houston (DC)
- 2010-14: Brazoswood HS (LB)
- 2022-24: Brazoswood HS (Asst)

Accomplishments and honors

Championships
- As coach: 3 Texas 4A state (1995–1997); As player: National (1970)

Alan Weddell (born March 12, 1950) is an American former football coach and player. He last served as assistant coach for Brazosport High School.

== Playing career ==
Weddell played high school football at Brazosport High School under head coach Harden Cooper and assistant coach L. Z. Bryan. Weddell was an offensive lineman for the Texas Longhorns under Darrell Royal from 1970 to 1972. He was part of the 1970 national championship team. Weddell graduated in 1973 from Texas-Austin with a bachelor's degree in production engineering. He later earned a master's degree in education and administration from the University of Houston–Victoria.

== Coaching career ==
=== High school coaching ===
Weddell began his coaching career as junior varsity and varsity assistant at Angleton High School from 1973 to 1977. He then went on to coach at Victoria High School in Victoria, Texas for twelve years, first as an assistant, and starting in 1982 as head coach. Weddell guided the Stingarees to a 47–32–1 record, winning district championships in 1986 and in 1989. He was twice named 26-5A Coach of the Year and won 35 of his last 40 regular season games.

In 1990, he started coaching at La Marque High School, where he turned the Cougar program into one of the perennial powerhouses in Texas high school football. From 1990 until 1997, Weddell coached the Cougars to three straight state championships (1995–97) and five consecutive appearances in the state title game. La Marque lost both the 1993 and the 1994 title games against Stephenville High School, which was then coached by Art Briles.

Weddell was a six-time District Coach of the Year and a Galveston County Coach of the Year on three occasions. Weddell compiled a 103–13 record at La Marque. Eleven coaches who worked with Weddell during his time at La Marque moved on to acquire head coaching jobs of their own and seven of them are still high school head coaches.

Weddell returned to the high school level at Brazoswood High School in Clute, Texas three times, once as defensive coordinator in 2004, again as linebackers coach from 2010–14 and finally as an assistant from 2022-24.

In 1997 he was named the Texas High School Coaches Association All-Star Coach and in 2018 he was named to the Texas High School Coaches Association Hall of Honor.

=== College coaching ===
Entering the collegiate ranks in 1998, Weddell was hired by Texas A&M University head coach R. C. Slocum to assist defensive coordinator Mike Hankwitz as middle linebackers coach. Staying in College Station until Slocum's retirement in 2002, Weddell was a part of four bowl teams (1998 Sugar Bowl, 1999 Alamo Bowl, 2000 Independence Bowl and 2001 Galleryfurniture.com Bowl) and the 1998 Big 12 championship team. When Slocum was forced to resign in 2002 his replacement Dennis Franchione did not retain Weddell.

After his first stint as Brazoswood, Weddell joined Art Briles' staff at the University of Houston in 2005. Originally hired as linebackers coach, Weddell was promoted to defensive coordinator in April 2006, after Ron Harris stepped down. With Weddell at the helm, the Cougar defense allowed just 21.9 points and 339.1 yards per game during the 2006 season.

After coaching staff changes when Kevin Sumlin replaced Briles as head coach, Weddell left Houston.

=== Athletic director ===
On January 15, 2019, Weddell became the Athletic Director of Brazosport Independent School District, which included his alma mater Brazosport High School. He retired from that position in 2022 to return to coaching.

== Head coaching record ==
Season	Team	Wins	Losses	Notes
1990	La Marque	9	3	
1991	La Marque	10	2	
1992	La Marque	12	1	
1993	La Marque	14	1	4A state runner up
1994	La Marque	15	1	4A state runner up
1995	La Marque	16	0	4A state champion
1996	La Marque	14	2	4A Div II state champion
1997	La Marque	13	3	4A Div II state champion
8	Total	103	13	
