= Sam Montgomery =

American football player (born 1990)

No. 99
- Position: Defensive end

Personal information
- Born: May 25, 1990 (age 36); Greenwood, South Carolina, U.S.
- Listed height: 6 ft 3 in (1.91 m)
- Listed weight: 262 lb (119 kg)

Career information
- High school: Greenwood (SC)
- College: LSU
- NFL draft: 2013: 3rd round, 95th overall pick

Career history
- Houston Texans (2013); Oakland Raiders (2013)*; Cincinnati Bengals (2014–2015)*; Edmonton Eskimos (2015–2016)*; Winnipeg Blue Bombers (2017)*; Massachusetts Pirates (2018); Memphis Express (2019); DC Defenders (2020); Massachusetts Pirates (2024)
- * Offseason or practice squad member only

Awards and highlights
- First-team All-American (2011); First-team All-SEC (2011, 2012)
- Stats at Pro Football Reference

Sidney Sammual Montgomery (born May 25, 1990) is an American former professional football defensive end. He was selected by the Houston Texans in the third round of the 2013 NFL draft. He played college football for the LSU Tigers, where he earned All-American recognition.

== Early life ==
Montgomery was born in Greenwood, South Carolina. He attended Greenwood High School, and played for the Greenwood Eagles high school football team.

Montgomery also ran track and field in addition to football. He was a member of the high school relay team. He ran a personal best time of 11.34 seconds in the 100 meters at the 2009 Regional 1 Class AAAA. He also competed in the shot put, he finished 4th with a throw of 14.20 meters.

Considered a four-star recruit by 247Sports.com, Montgomery was listed as the No. 3 weak-side defensive end in the nation in 2009.

== College career ==
While attending Louisiana State University, Montgomery played for coach Les Miles's LSU Tigers football team from 2010 to 2012. Following his sophomore season in 2011, he was named an All-American by the Football Writers Association of America, Pro Football Weekly, and Scout.com. He was also a first-team All-Southeastern Conference (SEC) selection in 2011 and 2012.

== Professional career ==
Pre-draft measurables
Height	Weight	Arm length	Hand span	Wingspan	40-yard dash	10-yard split	20-yard split	20-yard shuttle	Three-cone drill	Vertical jump	Broad jump	Bench press
6 ft 3 1/4 in (1.91 m)	262 lb (119 kg)	33 7/8 in (0.86 m)	9 1/4 in (0.23 m)	6 ft 7 3/4 in (2.03 m)	4.81 s	1.69 s	2.80 s	4.51 s	7.18 s	34.5 in (0.88 m)	9 ft 6 in (2.90 m)	22 reps
All values from NFL Combine/Pro Day

=== Houston Texans ===
Montgomery was selected by the Houston Texans in the third round, with the 95th overall pick, of the 2013 NFL draft.

The Texans released Montgomery, along with two other players, on October 21 for unspecified violations of team rules prior to a road game against the Kansas City Chiefs.

=== Oakland Raiders ===
He was signed by the Oakland Raiders on December 18, 2013. He was released on December 21, 2013.

=== Cincinnati Bengals ===
Montgomery signed with the Cincinnati Bengals on April 11, 2014. On August 31, 2014, he was signed to the Bengals' practice squad.

On January 23, 2015, Montgomery signed a reserve/future contract with the Bengals. On August 31, 2015, he was released by the Bengals.

=== Edmonton Eskimos ===
Montgomery was signed to the practice roster of the Edmonton Eskimos of the Canadian Football League (CFL) on September 30, 2015. He was released on June 19, 2016.

=== Winnipeg Blue Bombers ===
Montgomery was signed to the practice roster of the Winnipeg Blue Bombers of the CFL on October 17, 2017.

=== Massachusetts Pirates (first stint) ===
In June 2018, Montgomery signed with the Massachusetts Pirates of the National Arena League (NAL), and made his regular season debut with the Pirates on July 7 of that same year.

=== Memphis Express ===
In 2019, Montgomery joined the Memphis Express in the Alliance of American Football. He was placed on injured reserve on March 4, 2019. The league ceased operations in April 2019.

=== DC Defenders ===
Montgomery later moved to the XFL, where he was selected by the DC Defenders in the seventh round of the 2020 XFL draft. He had his contract terminated when the league suspended operations on April 10, 2020.

=== Massachusetts Pirates (second stint) ===
On April 20, 2024, Montgomery re-signed with the Pirates.
