= Brazosport High School =

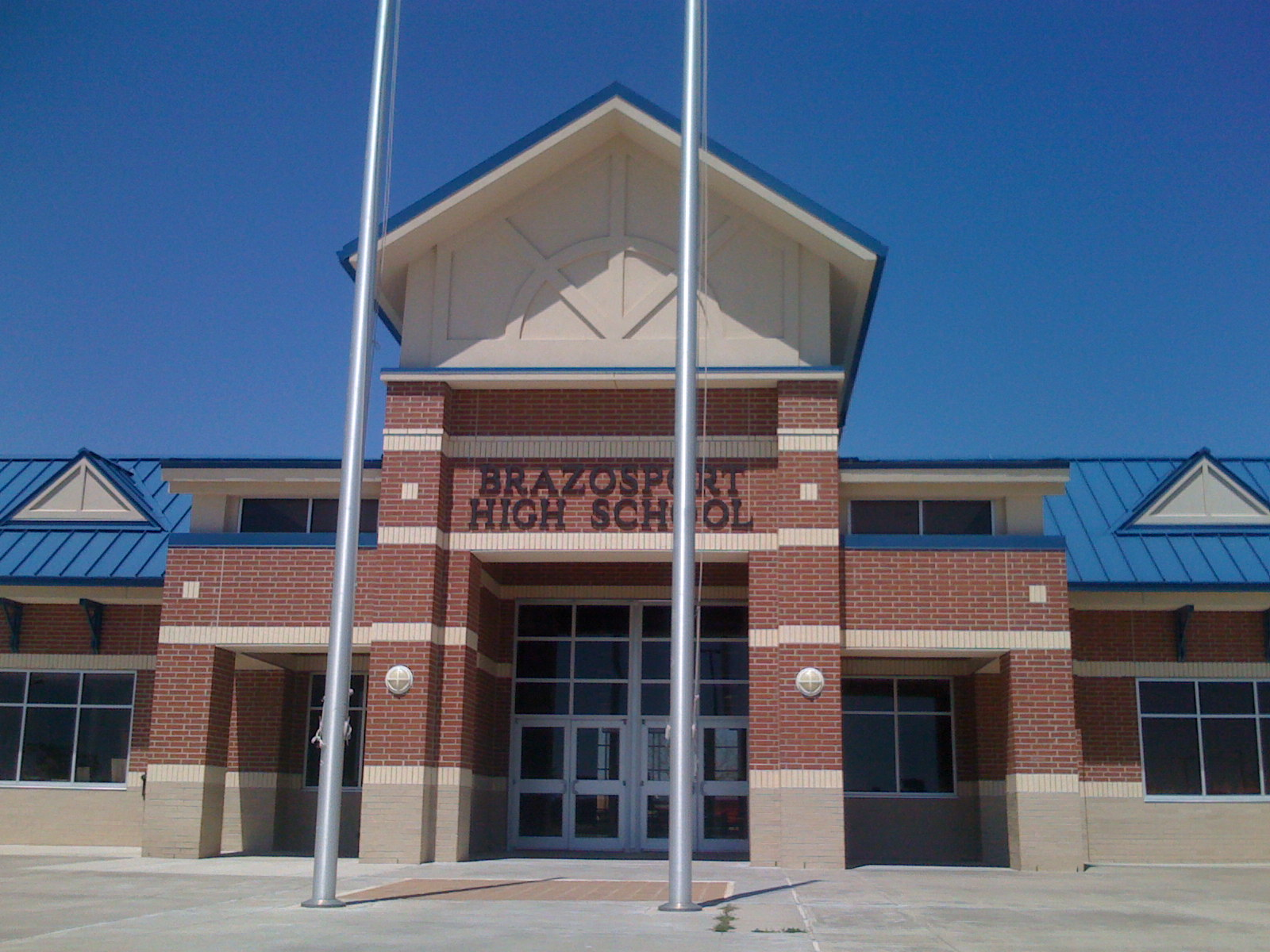
- Main entrance to Brazosport

Location
- 1800 West 2nd Street; Freeport, Texas 77541; United States; 28°57′24″N 95°22′10″W

Information
- Type: Public
- Motto: Education Today, Success Tomorrow
- Established: 1951
- School district: Brazosport Independent School District
- Principal: Quinton Virgil
- Teaching staff: 72.88 (FTE)
- Grades: 9–12
- Gender: Coeducational
- Enrollment: 915 (2023–2024)
- Student to teacher ratio: 12.02
- Colors: Red, White, and Blue
- Nickname: Exporters
- Rival: Brazoswood High School
- Accreditation: Texas Education Agency
- Yearbook: The Exporter
- Website: bphs.brazosportisd.net

Brazosport High School is a public high school located at the intersection of Brazosport Boulevard and West 2nd Street in Freeport, Texas, United States. It handles grades nine through twelve and is part of the Brazosport Independent School District.

The high school serves Freeport, as well as surrounding Jones Creek, Oyster Creek, Quintana, and Surfside Beach. The campus recently received major renovations, removing the majority of the original campus.

== Athletics ==
Brazosport High School is often nicknamed "B-Port" by its students. Athletic teams are known as the "Exporters" and sport the colors red, white and blue. The Exporters have earned two high school baseball state 4A championships (1964 and 1966). The Exporter football team plays their home games at Hopper Field located on-campus.

Brazosport High School is most known for their winter extracurricular activities, and offers Colorguard, Winterguard, The Shipmates Drill Team, Exporter Band, Orchestra, Sports, Academic Team, NHS, Student Council, Anime Club, FFA, and Debate Club.

The Brazosport Exporters compete in these sports -

- Baseball
- Basketball
- Cross Country
- Football
- Golf
- Powerlifting
- Soccer
- Softball
- Swimming and Diving
- Tennis
- Track and Field
- Volleyball

== History ==
The high school was originally the only one in the area before Brazoswood High School opened in September 1969 to serve the communities of Clute, Lake Jackson, and Richwood in the Brazosport Independent School District (BISD). The opening of Brazoswood High School created an immediate rivalry between the two schools that is still alive today.

== Feeder patterns ==
Freeport Elementary feeds into Velasco Elementary. Velasco feeds into Lanier Middle. Lanier Middle and SFA Stem Academy feed into Freeport Intermediate. Freeport Intermediate feeds into Brazosport.

== Academics ==
In 2007 Johns Hopkins University referred to Brazosport as a "dropout factory" where at least 40 percent of the entering freshman class does not make it to their senior year.

== See also ==
- Hopper Field - The Brazosport ISD stadium

== Notable alumni ==
- Fred Beene (born 1942), former Major League baseball player
- Bo Burris (born 1944), former NFL football player
- Randon Fontenette (born 2005), college football safety for the Colorado Buffaloes
- King Hill (1936–2012), former NFL football player
- Cedric Mack, former NFL football player
- Jaleen Smith (born 1994), basketball guard in the Israeli Basketball Premier League
- Ray Waddy (born 1956), former NFL player
- Alan Weddell, former football player and coach
- Melvin White (born 1990), former NFL player
