= Melvin White (American football) =

American football player (born 1990)

No. 23, 28
- Position: Cornerback

Personal information
- Born: June 26, 1990 (age 36); Freeport, Texas, U.S.
- Listed height: 6 ft 1 in (1.85 m)
- Listed weight: 203 lb (92 kg)

Career information
- High school: Brazosport (Freeport)
- College: Louisiana (2008–2012)
- NFL draft: 2013: undrafted

Career history
- Carolina Panthers (2013–2014); St. Louis Rams (2015)*; Minnesota Vikings (2016)*; Saskatchewan Roughriders (2017–2018)*
- * Offseason or practice squad member only

Career NFL statistics
- Total tackles: 83
- Forced fumbles: 2
- Pass deflections: 11
- Interceptions: 3
- Defensive touchdowns: 1
- Stats at Pro Football Reference

Melvin O'Key White (born June 26, 1990) is an American former professional football player who was a cornerback in the National Football League (NFL). He is known for having played with the St. Louis Rams and Carolina Panthers. He played college football for the Louisiana Ragin' Cajuns.

== Early life ==
A native of Freeport, Texas, White attended Brazosport High School, where he was a two-sport star in both football and track. In football, he played first as a wide receiver and then as a quarterback for coach Brian Welch, and was a second-team All-district selection as a junior. In his senior season, he switched from wide receiver to quarterback and was named first-team All-district and offensive MVP of Brazoria county as a quarterback after rushing for 783 yards on 128 carries (6.1 yards per carry) and completing 85-of-165 pass attempts (51.5%) for 999 yards.

White was also a standout in track & field at Brazosport, owning bests of 22 ft 11 in (6.99 m) in the long jump, achieved at the 2008 Pearland Regional Qualifiers Meet, and 44 ft 5 in (13.54 m) in the triple jump (2007 Gulf Coast Relays). He also participated in hurdles with a personal-best time of 14.9 seconds in the 110 metres hurdles.

Regarded as a two-star recruit by Rivals.com, White was not ranked among the top prospects of his class.

College recruiting
Name	Hometown	School	Height	Weight	Commit date
Melvin White; ATH	Freeport, Texas	Brazosport High School	6 ft 3 in (1.91 m)	180 lb (82 kg)	Feb 4, 2009
Melvin White; ATH	Recruit ratings: Rivals: 247Sports:				
Overall recruit ranking: Scout: 132 (QB) Rivals: NR
Note: In many cases, Scout, Rivals, 247Sports, On3, and ESPN may conflict in their listings of height and weight.; In these cases, the average was taken. ESPN grades are on a 100-point scale.; Sources: "Louisiana-Lafayette Football Commitment List". Rivals.; "2009 Louisiana-Lafayette Football Recruiting Commits". Scout.; "Scout.com Team Recruiting Rankings". Scout.; "2009 Team Ranking". Rivals.com.

== College career ==
White attended University of Louisiana at Lafayette, where he graduated with a degree in criminal justice and played four seasons for the Louisiana Ragin' Cajuns football team. White started 12 games at cornerback during his redshirt freshman year and recorded 12 tackles and 1 pass breakup in a game against LSU. During his sophomore year, White started 12 games. In a game against Arkansas State, White recovered a fumble that led to a field goal. In a game against Ole Miss, White registered a career-high seven tackles and added a 93-yard fumble return for a touchdown. During his junior season, White started 13 games at safety, finishing third on the team with 8.5 tackles-for-loss (−30 yards) with two interceptions for 101 yards and a touchdown, seven pass breakups and one forced fumble and one fumble recovery. In a game against Nicholls State, White returned a blocked field goal for a 68-yard touchdown, the third longest return touchdown in school history. In a game against Troy, White recorded an 89-yard interception touchdown, also the third longest in school history. During a victory against San Diego State in the New Orleans Bowl, White made 5 tackles and 2 pass breakups. For his efforts, White was given an Honorable mention All-Sun Belt Team. During his senior season, White started 13 games at cornerback and led the team with 10 passes defensed in addition to recording 60 tackles and one forced fumble. In his collegiate career, White compiled 155 tackles, 1.5 sacks, two interceptions, 19 passes defensed, two forced fumbles and three fumble recoveries. He graduated in December 2012 with a degree in criminal justice.

== Professional career ==
=== Pre-draft ===
Despite an impressive college career, White was a projected undrafted free agent in the 2013 NFL draft. He had an opportunity to impress NFL talent evaluators in the 2013 East–West Shrine Game.

Pre-draft measurables
Height	Weight	Arm length	Hand span	40-yard dash	10-yard split	20-yard split	20-yard shuttle	Three-cone drill	Vertical jump	Broad jump	Bench press
6 1 1/4	206 lb (93 kg)	32 5/8	9 1/8	4.59 s	1.70 s	2.71 s	4.47 s	7.29 s	32.5 in (0.83 m)	10 ft 2 in (3.10 m)	12 reps
All values from Louisiana Pro Day or East-West Shrine Game

At Louisiana's Pro Day, White (6–1 ¼, 203 pounds) worked out as a cornerback, ran the 40-yard dash in 4.59 and 4.62 seconds and recorded a 32-inch vertical jump and 10-foot-2 broad jump. He completed the 20-yard shuttle drill in 4.47 seconds and the three-cone drill in 7.29 seconds. White also recorded 12 strength lifts.

=== Carolina Panthers ===
==== 2013 ====
On May 10, 2013, White signed with the Carolina Panthers as an undrafted free agent. He made his debut in a 12–7 loss in the season-opener against the eventual Super Bowl Champion Seattle Seahawks.

Through the first six games, White allowed a stingy 58.9 passer rating when quarterbacks threw in his direction. In his second NFL game, in a 38-point shutout victory win against the New York Giants, White recorded 2 tackles, 1 pass defense, his first interception against quarterback, Eli Manning, and his first forced fumble on Giants wide receiver Louis Murphy in Carolina territory in the fourth quarter to help preserve shutout. In the season finale victory over the Atlanta Falcons, White intercepted a pass by Falcons quarterback Matt Ryan and returned it eight yards for a touchdown. He also collected a career-high eight tackles and helped the Panthers win the NFC South and secure their first playoff appearance since 2008.

In his rookie season, White started 10 regular season games and posted 45 tackles, two interceptions – one of which he returned for a touchdown – five passes defensed and one forced fumble. He contributed to unit that ranked second in the NFL in total defense and points allowed and led the league in sacks while finishing second in rushing defense and sixth in passing defense.

==== 2014 ====
White finished as the 5th best cornerback in the 2014 NFL Preseason according to Pro Football Focus (PFF). In the home opener against the Detroit Lions, White recorded 3 tackles, 3 pass deflections, and returned an interception 23 yards off a deflection from Thomas DeCoud on a pass from Matthew Stafford intended for Calvin Johnson. Through the first two games of the season, White led the NFL in passes defensed. During the Panthers wildcard playoff victory over the Arizona Cardinals, White forced a fumble on a kickoff return on Ted Ginn Jr., which led to a turnover and eventual touchdown.

=== St. Louis Rams ===
On September 3, 2015, White was released by the Carolina Panthers with an injury settlement. On September 15, 2015, the St. Louis Rams signed White to their practice squad.

=== Minnesota Vikings ===
On January 15, 2016, White signed a 1-year, $600,000 contract with the Minnesota Vikings to a reserve/future contract. On August 25, 2016, White was waived by the Vikings.

=== Saskatchewan Roughriders ===
White joined the Saskatchewan Roughriders of the CFL in October, 2017. On February 22, 2018, White was re-signed by the Riders.
