= Marrio Norman =

American gridiron football player (born 1986)

No. 1, 21
- Position: Defensive back

Personal information
- Born: August 10, 1986 (age 40); Greenwood, South Carolina, U.S.
- Listed height: 6 ft 1 in (1.85 m)
- Listed weight: 205 lb (93 kg)

Career information
- High school: Greenwood (South Carolina)
- College: Coastal Carolina (2004–2008)
- NFL draft: 2009: undrafted

Career history
- West Texas Roughnecks (2011); Georgia Force (2011–2012); Orlando Predators (2012–2013); Cleveland Gladiators (2013–2014); Baltimore Ravens (2014)*; Saskatchewan Roughriders (2015); Cleveland Gladiators (2015, 2017); Shanghai Skywalkers (2018)*; Albany Empire (2018); Washington Valor (2019)
- * Offseason or practice squad member only

Awards and highlights
- 2× First-team All-Arena (2014, 2018); First-team All-Big South (2007)

Career CFL statistics
- Tackles: 4
- Stats at CFL.ca (archived)

Career AFL statistics
- Tackles: 354.5
- Interceptions: 31
- INT return yards: 284
- Pass breakups: 57
- Total TDs: 3
- Stats at ArenaFan.com

Marrio Reytwan Norman (born August 10, 1986) is an American former professional football defensive back who played in the Arena Football League (AFL). Norman played college football at Coastal Carolina University. He was a member of the West Texas Roughnecks, Georgia Force, Orlando Predators, Cleveland Gladiators, Baltimore Ravens, Saskatchewan Roughriders, Shanghai Skywalkers, Albany Empire, and Washington Valor.

== Early life ==
Norman played high school football at Greenwood High School in Greenwood, South Carolina, earning two letters. He earned a spot in the Shrine Bowl of the Carolinas after being named to the High School Sports Report All-State team for the second consecutive year. He also earned Index-Journal Honorable Mention All-State honors two straight years. Norman played most of his senior season with a broken hard, recording 27 solo tackles, an interception and two pass breakups.

== College career ==
Norman played for the Coastal Carolina Chanticleers from 2004 to 2008. He earned first-team All-Big South honors in 2007 after recording 53 tackles.

== Professional career ==
Norman was rated the 57th best strong safety in the 2009 NFL draft by NFLDraftScout.com. On November 7, 2009, he was arrested and charged with simple possession of marijuana and possession of a suspended driver's license.

Norman played for the West Texas Roughnecks of the Indoor Football League in 2011.

Norman was signed by the Georgia Force of the Arena Football League (AFL) on October 3, 2011.

Norman signed with the Orlando Predators of the AFL on November 7, 2012. He was released by the Predators on April 24, 2013.

Norman was signed by the AFL's Cleveland Gladiators on May 7, 2013. He was named First Team All-Arena in 2014. He was placed on the Gladiators' Other League Exempt list on July 29, 2014.

Norman was signed by the Baltimore Ravens of the National Football League on July 29, 2014. He was released by the Ravens on August 25, 2014.

Norman signed with the Saskatchewan Roughriders of the Canadian Football League on May 5, 2015. He was released by the Roughriders on June 21, 2015. He was signed to the Roughriders' practice roster on June 23, 2015. Norman was promoted to the active roster on June 26 and added back to the practice roster on July 4, 2015. He was released by the Roughriders on July 16, 2015.

On July 29, 2015, Norman was assigned to the Cleveland Gladiators. He became a free agent after the 2015 season. He was assigned to the Gladiators on July 6, 2017.

Norman was selected by the Shanghai Skywalkers of the China Arena Football League (CAFL) in the second round of the 2017 CAFL draft.

On March 23, 2018, Norman was assigned to the Albany Empire of the AFL.

On March 6, 2019, Norman was assigned to the Washington Valor of the AFL.

== Personal life ==
Norman's brothers Josh, Renaldo and Orlando are also athletes. Josh played in the NFL, Renaldo played college basketball at Edward Waters College and Orlando played football at North Carolina A&T State University.
