= Greenwood High School (South Carolina) =

Location
- 1816 Cokesbury Road; Greenwood, South Carolina 29649; United States; 34.2309547°N 82.1756774°W

Information
- Type: Public high school
- Principal: Kathryn Benjamin
- Staff: 94.56 (FTE)
- Enrollment: 1,751 (2023–2024)
- Student to teacher ratio: 18.52
- Colors: Gold, black and white
- Mascot: Eagle
- Website: ghs.gwd50.org

Greenwood High School is a public school located in the city of Greenwood, South Carolina. The school has approximately 1,600 students and is one of two high schools in the Greenwood County School District 50. The principal is Kathryn Benjamin. The school's mascot is the Eagle.

== History ==
In the summer of 2008, Greenwood High began renovations to the campus. A new wing of classrooms was added, which has been completed and is now known as the "H-Building," and the library was extended. The school has an office section, a press box, and updated home bleachers.

In the summer of 2020, the Greenwood Performing Arts Auditorium was completed on Greenwood High School’s campus.

== Sports ==
Greenwood High School competes in SCHSL Class AAAA Region I with teams in baseball, basketball, cross country, football, golf, soccer, softball, swimming, tennis, track, volleyball, and wrestling.

== Notable alumni ==
- Robert Brooks – former National Football League (NFL) wide receiver
- Tomiko Brown-Nagin – Legal historian and professor at Harvard Law School and Harvard University
- Ben Coates – former All-Pro tight end for the New England Patriots
- Ernest Dye – former NFL offensive lineman
- Armanti Edwards – former quarterback for the Appalachian State Mountaineers and former wide receiver for the Carolina Panthers. Led the Mountaineers to two NCAA Division I Football Championships (Division 1-AA/FCS) in 2006 and 2007.
- Ben Martin – Golfer on the PGA Tour
- Will McCants – Author, Noted scholar for Brooking Institute
- Sam Montgomery – former NFL defensive end
- Josh Norman – Cornerback and Pro Bowler for the Washington Redskins
- Marrio Norman – Arena Football League defensive back
- Kelcy Quarles – former NFL defensive tackle
- D. J. Swearinger – Safety for the Washington Redskins
- John Terry – former Canadian Football League All-Star offensive tackle
- Harvey White – former American Football League quarterback
