= Freeport LNG =

American liquified natural gas producer and exporter

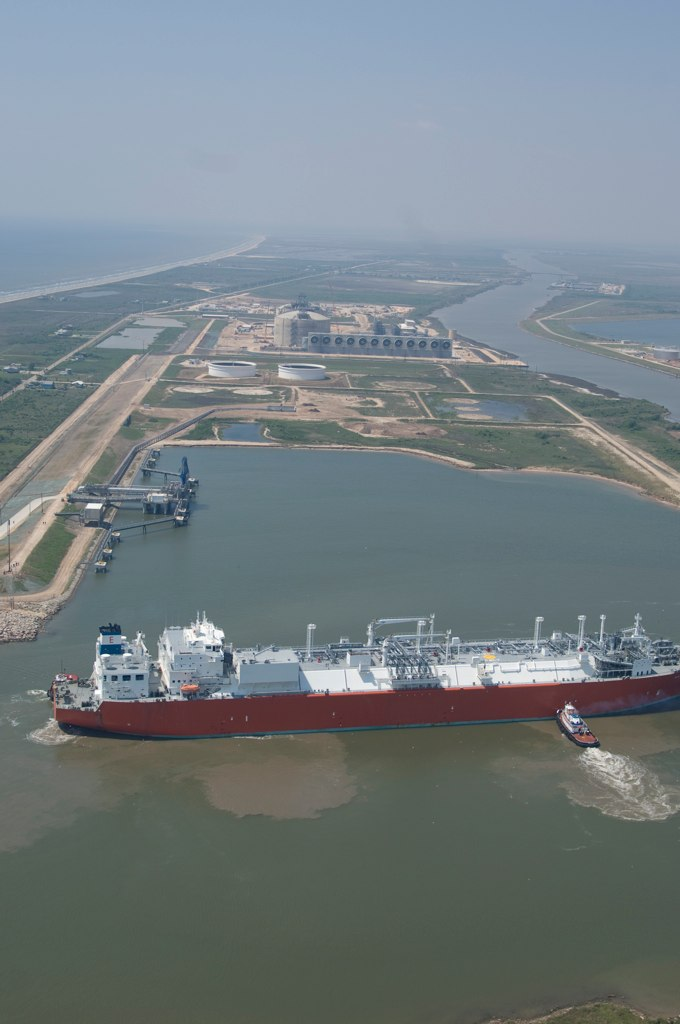
The LNG carrier Excalibur near the Freeport LNG terminal in 2008

Freeport LNG—also known as Freeport LNG Development, L.P.—is a U.S. exporter of Liquified Natural Gas (LNG) located in Freeport, Texas by supercooling fracked gas and loading it onto seafaring tankers. Freeport LNG was an early entrant to the then emerging U.S. LNG market in the early 2000s, initially as a gas importer, and then developed an LNG export terminal in the early 2010s after the US shale gas revolution. LNG import operations came online in 2008, while export operations began in 2019.

In June 2022, a pipeline rupture leaking combustible methane caused a fire and an explosion and forced Freeport LNG terminal offline. The terminal restarted commercial production 8 months later in February 2023.

== History ==
Freeport LNG Development, L.P., was founded as a limited partnership in 2002. The LNG Quintana Island project had been initially developed by Cheniere Energy and was subsequently funded for build out by the LP entity, consisting of Smith Entities (60%) and Cheniere (40%). As of 2009, the LP ownership was 45% Smith, 15% Dow Chemical Company, 30% Cheniere, and 10% Osaka Gas. As of 2019, Michael Smith Global Infrastructure Partners and Osaka Gas hold the primary LP interests for Freeport LNG. Michael Smith is Founder, Chairman and CEO of Freeport LNG.

In January 2005, the US regulatory authority permitted Freeport LNG to commence construction of the LNG terminal and natural gas pipeline. Freeport LNG started construction in the first quarter of 2005. The 2005 estimated cost to construct the facility was US$800–850 million, before financing costs, with terminal operations expected to commence in 2008. In the event, the company began operations as a gas importer in 2008.

A major shift in the LNG gas market due primarily to improvements in extracting gas from shale saw little need for the US to continue importing natural gas. In the early 2010s, Freeport LNG switched their market focus to becoming an exporter of LNG. This led to major investments in the facility and the construction of multiple process lines for natural gas liquefaction. Initial export operations began in December 2019. The multi-phase expansion costing more than $25 billion led to Freeport LNG having one of the largest LNG export facilities in the world.

On 8 June 2022, a fire and explosion occurred as a result of a pipeline rupture, taking the LNG terminal fully offline. As of June 2022, limited operations were expected to resume in September, with full service restored by the end of 2022. Because the terminal accounted for about 20% of US LNG exports, and with European countries looking for LNG imports as an alternative to Russian gas since the 2022 Russian invasion of Ukraine, the disruption had a major impact on international gas prices. Total losses from the event were estimated at US$6–8 billion. As of August 2022, resumption of partial operations of the plant were pushed back to November 2022. As of 29 November 2022, Freeport LNG was expected to partially resume shipments in mid-December, and to resume full shipments by March 2023. A report published in November 2022 blamed the explosion on inadequate operating and testing procedures, human error and alarm fatigue. The Texas Observer reported that a pressure release valve failed to open, causing a pipe to overheat and burst.
