= Ben Coates =

American football player and coach (born 1969)

No. 87, 81
- Position: Tight end

Personal information
- Born: August 16, 1969 (age 57); Greenwood, South Carolina, U.S.
- Listed height: 6 ft 5 in (1.96 m)
- Listed weight: 245 lb (111 kg)

Career information
- High school: Greenwood
- College: Livingstone (1987-1990)
- NFL draft: 1991: 5th round, 124th overall pick

Career history
- New England Patriots (1991–1999); Baltimore Ravens (2000)

Awards and highlights
- Super Bowl champion (XXXV); 2× First-team All-Pro (1994, 1995); Second-team All-Pro (1998); 5× Pro Bowl (1994–1998); NFL 1990s All-Decade Team; New England Patriots All-1990s Team; New England Patriots 50th Anniversary Team; New England Patriots Hall of Fame

Career NFL statistics
- Receptions: 499
- Receiving yards: 5,555
- Touchdowns: 50
- Stats at Pro Football Reference

Ben Terrence Coates Jr. (born August 16, 1969) is an American former professional football player who was a tight end in the National Football League (NFL) for 10 seasons, primarily with the New England Patriots. He played college football for the Livingstone Blue Bears and was selected by the Patriots in the fifth round of the 1991 NFL draft, where spent all but one season of his NFL career. In his final season, he was a member of the Baltimore Ravens.

During his nine seasons with the Patriots, Coates was a five-time Pro Bowler and two-time first-team All-Pro. He also made an appearance in Super Bowl XXXI. After being released by the Patriots, Coates signed with the Ravens and was part of the team that won Super Bowl XXXV. Coates pursued a coaching career following his retirement, serving as the head coach at his alma mater Livingstone and the tight ends coach for the Cleveland Browns. He was named to the second NFL 1990s All-Decade Team in 2000 and inducted to the New England Patriots Hall of Fame in 2008.

== Early life ==
Coates didn't play football until his senior year at Greenwood High School, and was a multi-sport player at Livingstone College located in Salisbury, North Carolina. As a gridiron player at Livingstone, he broke nearly all meaningful records at the school, but due to his split-sport performances against small-school opponents, he received little notice outside the CIAA. While a college student, he joined Phi Beta Sigma fraternity through the Untouchable Upsilon Chapter at Livingstone College. He finished his college career with 103 receptions for 1,268 yards and 18 touchdowns. In 2018, he was inducted into the Central Intercollegiate Athletic Association Hall of Fame.

== Professional career ==
Pre-draft measurables
| Height | Weight | Arm length | Hand span | 40-yard dash | 10-yard split | 20-yard split | 20-yard shuttle | Vertical jump | Broad jump | Bench press |
|---|---|---|---|---|---|---|---|---|---|---|
| 6 ft 4 1/2 in (1.94 m) | 243 lb (110 kg) | 35 in (0.89 m) | 10 in (0.25 m) | 4.95 s | 1.76 s | 2.92 s | 4.56 s | 28.0 in (0.71 m) | 9 ft 1 in (2.77 m) | 15 reps |

Considered an out-of-nowhere prospect, Coates was selected in the fifth round of the 1991 NFL draft by the New England Patriots. His first two years with the Patriots were fairly uneventful; in his rookie year he had ten catches for 95 yards and a two-yard touchdown against the Indianapolis Colts that forced overtime in a 23–17 Patriots win. In his second season, he had 20 catches for 171 yards and three touchdowns.

His career changed with the 1993 arrival of quarterback Drew Bledsoe and head coach Bill Parcells to the Patriots franchise. Parcells, known for his reliance on tight ends, frequently used then-rookie quarterback Bledsoe on passes to Coates, and the tight end led the Patriots in receptions in 1993 with 53 catches for 629 yards and eight scores, two of them in New England's season-ending overtime win over Miami.

In 1994, his breakout year, he caught 96 passes, the most ever for a tight end to that point, breaking a record previously set by Todd Christensen in 1986 (the record was later broken by Tony Gonzalez in 2004), for 1,174 yards receiving, the only time in his career he would gain 1,000 yards in a receiving season, while also scoring seven touchdowns. He appeared in his first of five consecutive Pro Bowls.

In 1996, Coates had 62 catches for 682 yards and nine touchdowns; the most dramatic was against the New York Giants in the final game of the regular season as he caught a 12-yard pass and bulled through Giants defenders for the game-winning score of a 23–22 New England win. His efforts helped New England to a championship appearance in Super Bowl XXXI. His team lost the game, 35–21, but he had a good performance in it, leading the Patriots in receiving with 6 catches for 66 yards and a touchdown. From 1995 to 1998, he caught 84, 62, 66, and 67 passes, respectively, in those four seasons.

After the 1999 season, which saw a significant decline in production, Coates was released by the Patriots. He subsequently played for the Baltimore Ravens, where he climbed the all-time receiving charts and won Super Bowl XXXV in the process. When Coates was released by the Ravens in the following year, he decided to retire, having become the fourth all-time leading receiver at tight end in NFL history, behind Ozzie Newsome, former teammate Shannon Sharpe, and Kellen Winslow. Coates played in 158 games with 499 receptions for 5,555 yards and 50 touchdowns.

After retiring, Coates returned to Livingstone College, where he was head coach, and also coached in NFL Europe. In 2004, he served an internship with the Dallas Cowboys as an assistant for the tight ends, reuniting him with head coach Parcells. In March 2005, Coates was named the tight ends coach for the Cleveland Browns, replacing Rob Chudzinski, under head coach Romeo Crennel, who had been the defensive line coach of the Patriots while Coates was with the team.

It was announced on July 7, 2008, that Coates would be inducted into the New England Patriots Hall of Fame. During his playing days with the Patriots, Coates was a fan favorite and was given the nickname "Winter" (as in "winter coat"), in addition to Ben "Technicolor Dream" Coates by ESPN commentator Chris Berman.

== NFL career statistics ==
| Year | Team | GP | Receiving | | | | | | Fumbles | |
| Year | Team | GP | Rec | Yds | Avg | Lng | TD | FD | Fum | Lost |
|---|---|---|---|---|---|---|---|---|---|---|
| 1991 | NE | 16 | 10 | 95 | 9.5 | 17 | 1 | 6 | 0 | 0 |
| 1992 | NE | 16 | 20 | 171 | 8.6 | 22 | 3 | 55 | 1 | 1 |
| 1993 | NE | 16 | 53 | 659 | 12.4 | 54 | 8 | 32 | 0 | 0 |
| 1994 | NE | 16 | 96 | 1,174 | 12.2 | 62 | 7 | 65 | 2 | 1 |
| 1995 | NE | 16 | 84 | 915 | 10.9 | 35 | 6 | 51 | 4 | 4 |
| 1996 | NE | 16 | 62 | 682 | 11.0 | 84 | 9 | 37 | 1 | 1 |
| 1997 | NE | 16 | 66 | 737 | 11.2 | 35 | 8 | 37 | 0 | 0 |
| 1998 | NE | 14 | 67 | 668 | 10.0 | 33 | 6 | 45 | 0 | 0 |
| 1999 | NE | 16 | 32 | 370 | 11.6 | 27 | 2 | 20 | 0 | 0 |
| 2000 | BAL | 16 | 9 | 84 | 9.3 | 28 | 0 | 3 | 0 | 0 |
| Career | | 158 | 499 | 5,555 | 11.1 | 84 | 50 | 308 | 8 | 7 |
