= Freeport, Texas =

City in Brazoria County, Texas, United States

- City
- Motto: "Where Fun Happens"
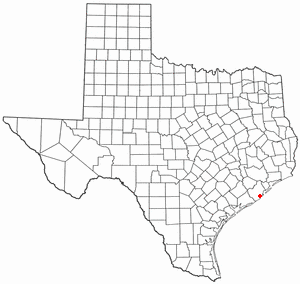
- Location in the state of Texas

- Location within Texas Location within the United States
- Coordinates: 28°57′34″N 95°21′25″W
- Country: United States
- State: Texas
- County: Brazoria
- Incorporated: February 10, 1917

Government
  - Type: Council-Manager
  - City Council: Mayor Brooks Bass; Jeff Peña; Jerry Cain; George Matamoros; Winston Rossow
  - City Manager: Lance Petty

Area
  - Total: 17.70 sq mi (45.84 km^{2})
  - Land: 15.40 sq mi (39.88 km^{2})
  - Water: 2.30 sq mi (5.96 km^{2})
- Elevation: 5 ft (1.5 m)

Population (2020)
  - Total: 10,696
  - Density: 788.2/sq mi (304.31/km^{2})
- Time zone: UTC-6 (CST)
  - Summer (DST): UTC-5 (CDT)
- ZIP codes: 77541-77542
- Area code: 979
- FIPS code: 48-27420
- GNIS feature ID: 1357720
- Website: www.freeporttx.gov

Freeport is a city in Brazoria County, Texas, United States, located on the Gulf of Mexico, founded in 1912. According to the 2020 census, the city population was 10,696, down from 12,049 in 2010.

Freeport's economic growth began in 1939 with the construction of Dow Chemical Company facilities, which remain its largest employer and are the largest integrated chemical manufacturing facility in the United States.

In 2002, Freeport LNG was founded; an LNG export terminal was developed in the early 2010s after the US shale gas revolution and came online in 2019. In June 2022 a pipeline rupture and explosion closed the terminal until February 2023.

== History ==
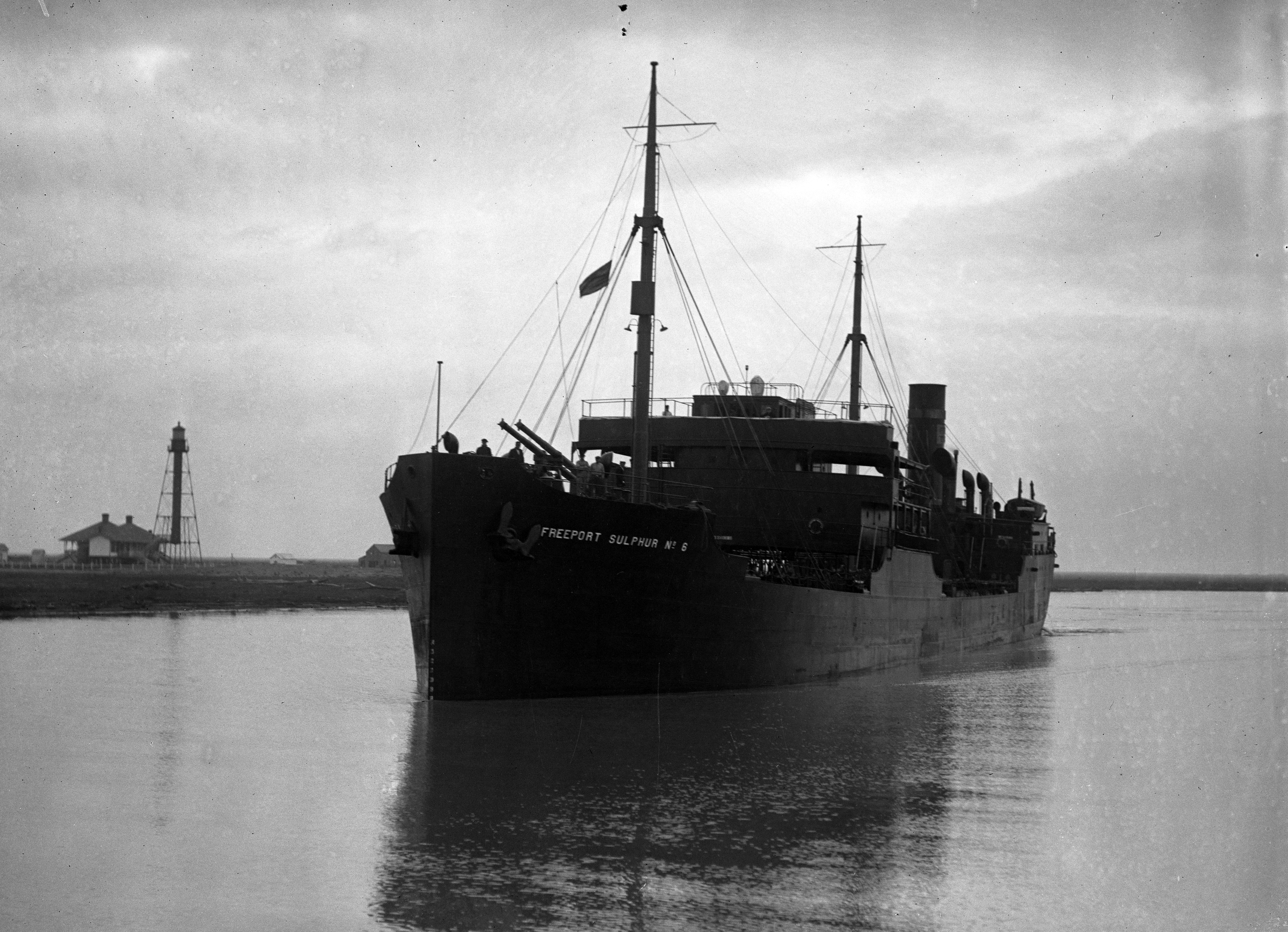
Freeport Sulphur No.6 entering Freeport harbor, 1923

Freeport was founded as a European-American settlement in November 1912 by the Freeport Sulphur Company. The population was 300. However, by 1929, that population had grown to 3,500, and to 4,100 by 1939, influencing a steady increase of economic expansion in Freeport.

By 1937, a Freeport School District had been established, consisting of several segregated schools and 27 teachers. There were two white schools, one black school, and a white high school.

Freeport's most substantial economic growth began with the construction of Dow Chemical Company facilities in the city during 1939. As of 2007, this company is the community's largest employer. As of 2011, Freeport had Dow's largest single manufacturing site in the 21st century.

In July 1957, Freeport merged with Velasco. This had been a temporary capital of the Republic of Texas during the 19th century. Soon thereafter, Freeport's population numbered 11,619. In 2003, the city annexed nearby Bryan Beach.

== Geography ==
Freeport is located in southern Brazoria County at 28°57′34″N 95°21′25″W (28.959527, –95.356941), near the mouth of the Brazos River in the Gulf of Mexico. In 2003, the city annexed 3.5 miles (5.6 km) of beach bounded on the northeast by the village of Quintana and continuing southwest to the mouth of the Brazos River. This beach is known as Bryan Beach. It is just a few miles away from Surfside and Quintana beaches.

Texas State Highway 288, the Nolan Ryan Expressway, leads north from Freeport 17 miles (27 km) to Angleton, the county seat, and 61 miles (98 km) to downtown Houston. Texas State Highway 36 leads northwest 15 miles (24 km) to Brazoria.

According to the United States Census Bureau, Freeport has a total area of 17.1 square miles (44.2 km^{2}), of which 14.9 square miles (38.7 km^{2}) is land and 2.1 square miles (5.5 km^{2}), or 12.36%, is water.

=== Climate ===
The climate in this area is characterized by hot, humid summers and generally mild winters. According to the Köppen Climate Classification system, Freeport has a humid subtropical climate, abbreviated "Cfa" on climate maps.

Climate data for Freeport, Texas (1991–2020 normals, extremes 1959–present)
Month	Jan	Feb	Mar	Apr	May	Jun	Jul	Aug	Sep	Oct	Nov	Dec	Year
Record high °F (°C)	83 (28)	83 (28)	88 (31)	95 (35)	98 (37)	103 (39)	101 (38)	104 (40)	105 (41)	96 (36)	90 (32)	84 (29)	105 (41)
Mean maximum °F (°C)	76.9 (24.9)	78.5 (25.8)	81.3 (27.4)	85.6 (29.8)	90.0 (32.2)	93.5 (34.2)	95.0 (35.0)	96.6 (35.9)	94.4 (34.7)	89.7 (32.1)	84.1 (28.9)	79.2 (26.2)	97.3 (36.3)
Mean daily maximum °F (°C)	64.1 (17.8)	67.2 (19.6)	72.7 (22.6)	78.1 (25.6)	84.2 (29.0)	89.7 (32.1)	91.5 (33.1)	92.0 (33.3)	89.0 (31.7)	82.5 (28.1)	73.6 (23.1)	66.9 (19.4)	79.3 (26.3)
Daily mean °F (°C)	55.2 (12.9)	58.7 (14.8)	64.5 (18.1)	70.5 (21.4)	77.4 (25.2)	83.1 (28.4)	84.9 (29.4)	85.1 (29.5)	81.2 (27.3)	73.9 (23.3)	64.3 (17.9)	57.8 (14.3)	71.4 (21.9)
Mean daily minimum °F (°C)	46.2 (7.9)	50.1 (10.1)	56.3 (13.5)	62.8 (17.1)	70.6 (21.4)	76.4 (24.7)	78.3 (25.7)	78.1 (25.6)	73.4 (23.0)	65.3 (18.5)	55.0 (12.8)	48.7 (9.3)	63.4 (17.4)
Mean minimum °F (°C)	31.7 (−0.2)	36.2 (2.3)	39.7 (4.3)	48.0 (8.9)	59.4 (15.2)	68.4 (20.2)	72.4 (22.4)	72.0 (22.2)	63.4 (17.4)	49.1 (9.5)	39.0 (3.9)	34.1 (1.2)	29.3 (−1.5)
Record low °F (°C)	15 (−9)	15 (−9)	25 (−4)	36 (2)	41 (5)	57 (14)	64 (18)	65 (18)	45 (7)	34 (1)	26 (−3)	13 (−11)	13 (−11)
Average precipitation inches (mm)	4.02 (102)	2.44 (62)	2.91 (74)	2.87 (73)	3.87 (98)	4.74 (120)	4.18 (106)	4.98 (126)	7.06 (179)	4.37 (111)	4.69 (119)	3.80 (97)	49.93 (1,268)
Average snowfall inches (cm)	0.0 (0.0)	0.0 (0.0)	0.0 (0.0)	0.0 (0.0)	0.0 (0.0)	0.0 (0.0)	0.0 (0.0)	0.0 (0.0)	0.0 (0.0)	0.0 (0.0)	0.0 (0.0)	0.0 (0.0)	0.0 (0.0)
Average precipitation days (≥ 0.01 in)	9.7	8.2	6.9	6.1	6.1	7.8	8.2	7.9	9.6	6.6	7.4	9.6	94.1
Average snowy days (≥ 0.1 in)	0.0	0.0	0.0	0.0	0.0	0.0	0.0	0.0	0.0	0.0	0.0	0.0	0.0
Source: NOAA

== Demographics ==
Historical population
Census	Pop.	Note	%±
1920	1,798		—
1930	3,162		75.9%
1940	2,579		−18.4%
1950	6,012		133.1%
1960	11,619		93.3%
1970	11,997		3.3%
1980	13,444		12.1%
1990	11,389		−15.3%
2000	12,708		11.6%
2010	12,049		−5.2%
2020	10,696		−11.2%
U.S. Decennial Census

=== 2020 census ===
As of the 2020 census, Freeport had a population of 10,696 and 2,993 families residing in the city. The median age was 33.4 years. 27.7% of residents were under the age of 18 and 11.6% of residents were 65 years of age or older. For every 100 females there were 101.7 males, and for every 100 females age 18 and over there were 100.5 males age 18 and over.

Racial composition as of the 2020 census
Race	Number	Percent
White	4,029	37.7%
Black or African American	1,218	11.4%
American Indian and Alaska Native	119	1.1%
Asian	58	0.5%
Native Hawaiian and Other Pacific Islander	0	0.0%
Some other race	2,728	25.5%
Two or more races	2,544	23.8%
Hispanic or Latino (of any race)	6,798	63.6%

98.8% of residents lived in urban areas, while 1.2% lived in rural areas.

There were 3,621 households in Freeport, of which 40.9% had children under the age of 18 living in them. Of all households, 43.2% were married-couple households, 21.9% were households with a male householder and no spouse or partner present, and 27.1% were households with a female householder and no spouse or partner present. About 20.8% of all households were made up of individuals and 8.1% had someone living alone who was 65 years of age or older.

There were 4,580 housing units, of which 20.9% were vacant. The homeowner vacancy rate was 2.4% and the rental vacancy rate was 26.0%.

According to the census numbers as of 2016, there were 12,153 people, 3,788 households with an average of 3.17 persons per household. The median gross rent was $711.00 and the owner-occupied housing rate was 49.5%. The racial makeup of the city was 33.2% non-Hispanic White, 13.9% African American, 0.56% Native American, 0.35% Asian, 0.01% Pacific Islander, 20.91% from other races, and 3.24% from two or more races. Hispanic or Latino of any race were 52.0% of the population. Languages spoken in the household other than English is 49.4%.

The mean travel time to work for workers age 16+ was 15.2 minutes. In 2012, there were approximately 1,230 businesses in Freeport.

In the city, the median age for females is 29 years old and for males is 28. 34.1% of the population is 18 years of age or younger.

The median income for a household in the city was $36,044. The per capita income for the city was $17,707. About 27.5% of families were below the poverty line.

== Economy ==
Port Freeport is a seaport on the Gulf of Mexico and is currently ranked 26th in international tonnage. The associated chemical plants provide a stable economy. Freeport is the site of the Dow Chemical Company's Texas Operations facility, which is the company's largest integrated site and the largest integrated chemical manufacturing facility in the United States. Chemical production includes Alkalines And Chlorine, Industrial Gases, Industrial Inorganic Chemicals, Plastics Materials And Resins, Synthetic Rubber, Cyclic Crudes And Intermediates, Industrial Organic Chemicals, Agricultural Chemicals, Adhesives And Sealants, and Petroleum Refining.

In 2002, Freeport LNG was founded; LNG import came online in 2008, an LNG export terminal was developed in the early 2010s after the US shale gas revolution and came online 2019. LNG in Freeport comes from Texas shale formations cracked open through hydraulic fracturing. In June 2022, a pipeline rupture caused methane to leak and an explosion after which the LNG terminal was closed for 8 months.

== Government ==
Freeport is in Texas' 14th congressional district, and is represented by Congressman Randy Weber.

== Media ==
The Brazosport Facts in Clute is a local paper. It was headquartered in Freeport until the move to Clute in 1976.

The Houston Chronicle is the metropolitan area newspaper.

== Education ==
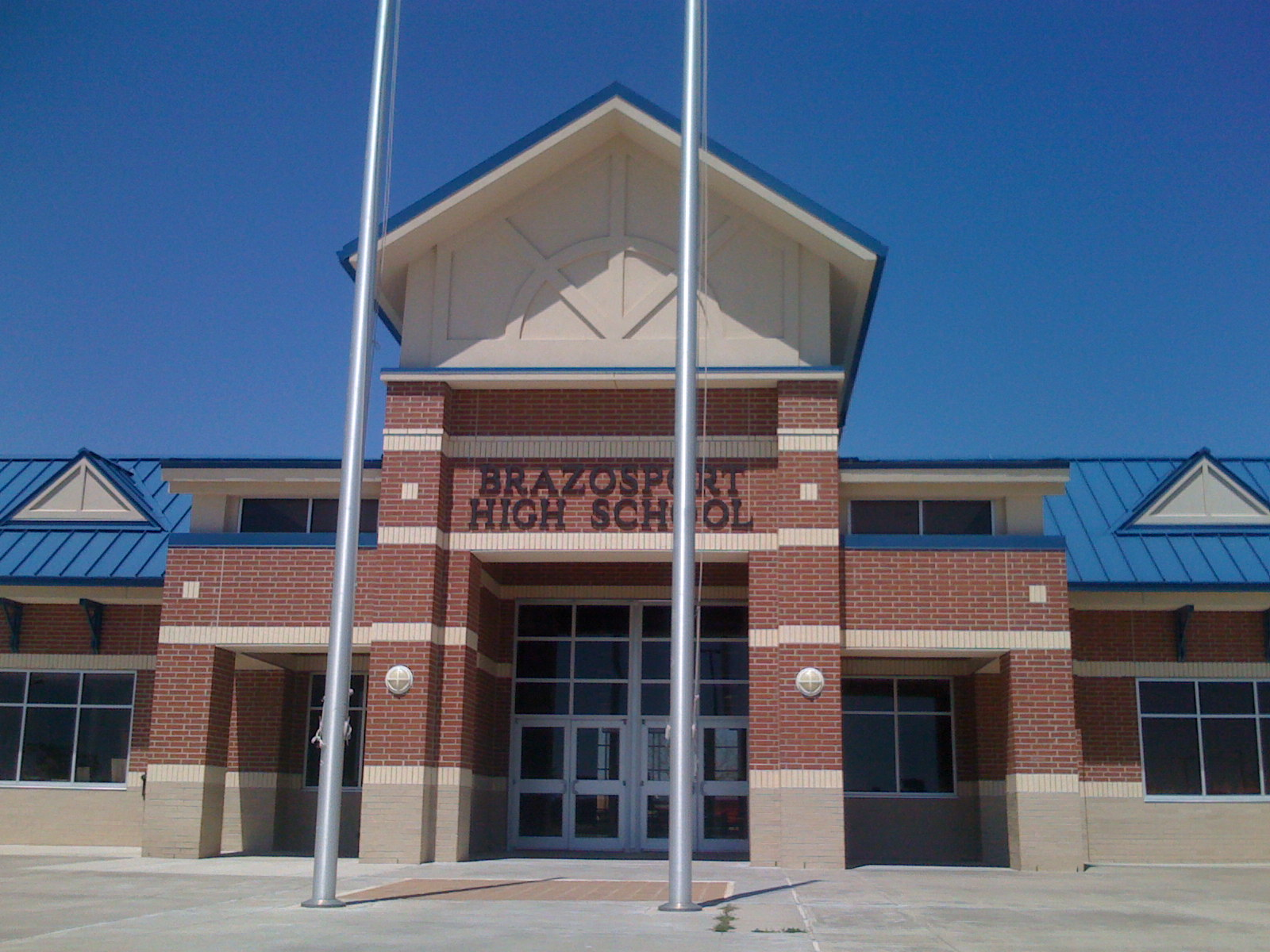
Brazosport High School

=== Public education ===
Schools in Freeport include Brazosport High School (Grades 9–12), Freeport Intermediate School (Grades 7–8), Lanier Middle School (Grades 5–6), Freeport Elementary, and Velasco Elementary School but this place shut down (Grades Pre-K–4). They are all maintained through Brazosport Independent School District.

The $19.2 million Freeport Elementary facility opened in 2018. VLK Architects designed the building. The student capacity is 750.

Velasco Elementary was a Kindergarten through grade 4 school until 2017, when it became a grade 2–4 school for all of Freeport. Grades K–1 were moved to O. A. Fleming Elementary, which was scheduled to close in 2018 and be replaced by Freeport Elementary.

Previously Freeport had O.A. Fleming Elementary School (PK–1), and Jane Long Elementary School (grades 2–4). Jane Long was scheduled to close in 2017, with Fleming taking grades K–1 and Velasco Elementary taking over grades 2–4. Fleming was scheduled to close when the new Freeport Elementary School opened in 2018.

=== Tertiary education ===
It is within the zone for Brazosport College. The Texas Legislature designated the Brazosport ISD as in the Brazosport College zone.

=== Libraries ===
The Freeport Library is a part of the Brazoria County Library System.

== Notable persons ==
- Jaleen Smith (born 1994), basketball guard in the Israeli Basketball Premier League
- Ray Waddy (born 1956), former NFL football player
- Alan Weddell (born 1950), former football coach and player
- Jared Wells (born 1981), former Major League baseball pitcher

== See also ==
- List of municipalities in Texas
