= Georgia Southern Eagles football =

Georgia Southern Eagles Football program

2026 Georgia Southern Eagles football team
- First season: 1924; 102 years ago (Note: Georgia Southern did not field a football team from 1942 to 1981.)
- Athletic director: Chris Davis
- Head coach: Clay Helton; 4th season, 26–25 (.510)
- Location: Statesboro, Georgia
- Stadium: Paulson Stadium (capacity: 25,000)
- NCAA division: Division I FBS
- Conference: Sun Belt
- Division: East
- Colors: Blue and white
- All-time record: 432–264–10 (.619)
- Bowl record: 4–4 (.500)

NCAA Division I FCS championships
- 1985, 1986, 1989, 1990, 1999, 2000

Conference championships
- SoCon: 1993, 1997, 1998, 1999, 2000, 2001, 2002, 2004, 2011, 2012 SBC: 2014
- Rivalries: Appalachian State (rivalry); Georgia State (rivalry)
- Fight song: Eagle Fanfare; Georgia Southern Fight Song
- Mascot: GUS (costume); Freedom (live, 2006–2025)
- Marching band: Southern Pride Marching Band
- Outfitter: Adidas
- Website: gseagles.com

The Georgia Southern Eagles football program represents Georgia Southern University in football as part of the Sun Belt Conference. The current head coach is Clay Helton. The Eagles have won six FCS (I-AA) national championships and have produced two Walter Payton Award winners. Georgia Southern first continuously fielded a football team in 1924, but play was suspended for World War II and did not return until 1981. The Eagles competed as an FCS independent from 1984 to 1992 and as a member of the Southern Conference from 1993 to 2013, winning 10 SoCon championships. In 2014, Georgia Southern moved to the FBS level and joined the Sun Belt Conference, winning the conference championship outright in its first year. Georgia Southern's main Sun Belt rivals are Appalachian State and Georgia State.

== History ==
=== Early history ===
As First District A&M, the school began organizing football teams as early as 1909. However, the college first continuously fielded a team in 1924. In 1929, Crook Smith, a sports standout from Mercer University, was hired as football coach and athletics director and led the football team for 13 seasons. Football was suspended in 1941 at the outset of World War II and would not return for 41 years.

=== Erk Russell (1981–1989) ===
In 1978, President Dale Lick decided that football should be revived at Georgia Southern College. Despite a faculty senate vote against renewing the sport, Lick worked to generate support for the endeavor. In 1982, the school hired Erk Russell, the popular and charismatic defensive coordinator at Georgia, to coach the new football team. On the hire, humorist Lewis Grizzard said, "When they landed Erk Russell, they got themselves a franchise." The Eagles fielded a club team in 1982 and 1983 and began official NCAA Division I-AA play in 1984. The next year, the Eagles would win their first Division I-AA national championship in Tacoma, Washington, defeating Furman, in only the team's fourth year in existence, second as a varsity team. The Eagles would return to Tacoma the next year and win the championship vs. Arkansas State. In 1989, the Eagles became the first college team to go 15–0 in the 20th century, winning the national championship on their home field vs. Stephen F. Austin. Soon after the game, Russell retired.

=== Tim Stowers (1990–1995) ===
Tim Stowers was hired to succeed Russell after Georgia Southern's 1989 (15–0) national title. Stowers was the 1989 offensive coordinator, one of only two coordinators since 1900 to direct an offense of a team with a 15–0 record. Stowers led the Eagles to their fourth I-AA championship against Nevada in his first season. He also won Georgia Southern's first Southern Conference Title in 1993, the Eagles' first year in the league, and was named 1993 Southern Conference Coach of the Year. However, despite these accomplishments, Stowers was never able to live up to the expectations set by Russell and was fired in 1995 after a 9–4 record by then-new athletics director Sam Baker, who never saw Stowers coach a game.

=== Frank Ellwood (1996) ===
Stowers was succeeded by interim coach Frank Ellwood for one year. The 1996 season was the first losing season in the modern era as the Eagles fell to 4–7.

=== Paul Johnson (1997–2001) ===
The next coach for the Eagles was Paul Johnson, a former offensive coordinator for Erk Russell's 1985 and 1986 championship teams. Johnson found instant success, taking the Eagles to the playoffs in his first season. He, along with Eagle legend Adrian N. Peterson, reached the 1998 national championship; however, the Eagles lost the game to UMass in Chattanooga, Tennessee. The Eagles rebounded under Johnson and won back-to-back national championships in 1999 (vs. Youngstown State) and 2000 (vs. Montana). Both championships were won in Chattanooga. After the 2001 season, Johnson resigned to become the head coach of Navy.

=== Mike Sewak (2002–2005) ===
Johnson was succeeded by Mike Sewak. Despite winning the Southern Conference championship twice in his tenure (outright title in 2002 and shared title in 2004), his lack of postseason success as well as a falling out with former head coach Erk Russell led to his firing after the 2005 season.

=== Brian VanGorder (2006) ===
Brian VanGorder, a former defensive coordinator at Georgia, was hired to succeed Sewak. In the first of many controversial moves, VanGorder scrapped Georgia Southern's famed triple-option offense and did away with certain traditions, such as the team's arrival at home games on yellow school buses. Erk Russell had also died unexpectedly of a stroke on the eve the first game of the 2006 season after addressing the team on the night before. VanGorder led the team to a 3–8 record, the worst record during Georgia Southern's FCS tenure. After his one year as coach, VanGorder resigned to take an assistant coach position at the University of South Carolina, but accepted a job with the Atlanta Falcons five weeks later.

=== Chris Hatcher (2007–2009) ===
Chris Hatcher, formerly the head coach at Valdosta State, which he led to the 2004 NCAA Division II Football Championship, was named the new head coach on January 19, 2007. Hatcher led the Eagles back to a winning record with a 7–4 finish, barely missing the FCS playoffs. However, Hatcher could not replicate the success of his first season, going 11–11 in the following two seasons, and he was fired after the conclusion of the 2009 season, the team's third modern era season with a losing record at 5–6, and the second within four years.

=== Jeff Monken (2010–2013) ===
On November 29, 2009, school officials announced that Jeff Monken, a longtime assistant coach under Paul Johnson, would become the next head coach of the Eagles. Monken's hiring signaled the return of the triple-option offense which brought success to the program in years past. In Monken's first year, the Eagles finished the regular season with a 7–4 record and made their first playoff appearance since 2005, advancing to the semifinals, where the Eagles fell to the Delaware Blue Hens.

During the 2011 season, Georgia Southern was ranked No. 1 in the FCS for the first time since the 2001 season. Additionally, Georgia Southern clinched the Southern Conference Football Championship for the first time since 2004 and first time outright since 2002. The Eagles finished the 2011 regular season with a 9–2 record; however, they were ousted in the semifinals for a second straight year by the eventual FCS champion North Dakota State Bison. In the 2012 season, the Eagles finished the regular season with an 8–3 record with a share of the Southern Conference Championship; however, the Eagles fell for a third straight time in what was ultimately the team's final FCS playoff game in the FCS semifinals, losing a rematch of the previous year's semifinal game against North Dakota State. In the team's final FCS season, the Eagles compiled a 7–4 record. In the final game of that season, the Eagles earned an upset win over Florida 26–20, the Eagles' first win over a Power Five FBS team, and the Gators' first loss to an FCS program. On December 24, 2013, Monken resigned to become the next head coach of Army.

After years of rumors and fan speculation, Georgia Southern announced its intentions to move to the Football Bowl Subdivision level in April 2012. The university plans to raise $36.6 million over eight years to accommodate the move. Paulson Stadium would be expanded to FBS-standards by constructing a 57,000 square feet (5,295 m^{2}) football operations center in the eastern end of the stadium and adding 6,300 seats on the north stands. Additionally, students voted in favor of raising student athletic fees by $100 to accommodate the move. $25 of the fee increase would be used for the stadium expansion project while the remaining $75 is implemented as the "FBS Fee".

On July 27, 2012, then-Athletics Director Sam Baker resigned. Baker was an ardent supporter of remaining in the FCS despite then-university president Brooks Keel's proclamation, mainly due to the financial ramifications of moving to a higher level. On November 12, 2012, President Keel named Tom Kleinlein as athletics director. On March 27, 2013, Georgia Southern announced its move to the Sun Belt Conference on July 1, 2014, becoming bowl-eligible in 2015. In the 2013 season, Georgia Southern's football schedule remained the same, but the team was ineligible for the Southern Conference title as well as postseason play. The university paid the Southern Conference $600,000 in exit fees.

=== Willie Fritz (2014–2015) ===
On January 10, 2014, Willie Fritz, formerly the head coach of Sam Houston State, was named as the Eagles' ninth modern era head coach and first of the FBS era. In the Eagles' first FBS season, the team finished the season 9–3 overall and was undefeated in Sun Belt Conference play at 8–0, winning the outright conference championship. The Eagles became only the third team ever to win a conference title in its first FBS season, after Nevada in 1992 (Big West Conference) and Marshall in 1997 (Mid-American Conference). They were also the first team ever to go unbeaten in conference play in their first FBS season. Since the Eagles were under transitional status, the university filed for a postseason waiver to allow the Eagles to play in a bowl game; however, the NCAA denied Georgia Southern's waiver request and a subsequent appeal since enough full member FBS teams became bowl-eligible during the season. In the 2015 season, Fritz led the Eagles to an 8-4 record, receiving their first bowl bid to the GoDaddy Bowl on December 23, 2015 against Bowling Green.

On December 11, 2015, Fritz resigned as the Eagles head coach to accept the head coaching position at Tulane. Assistant head coach and running backs coach Dell McGee was appointed as interim head coach for the GoDaddy Bowl game, where Georgia Southern defeated Bowling Green 58–27.

=== Tyson Summers (2016–2017) ===
Tyson Summers was hired on December 21, 2015 to succeed Fritz. Summers had served as safeties coach for Georgia Southern during the 2006 season under Brian VanGorder, and held the defensive coordinator and safeties coach roles at Colorado State in 2015. During Summers' first season in 2016, Georgia Southern suffered its first losing season in the FBS era, and fourth overall in the modern era. Summers was fired on October 22, 2017 after starting the 2017 season with a six-game losing streak.

=== Chad Lunsford (2017–2021) ===
After Summers was fired, assistant head coach Chad Lunsford was appointed as interim head coach for the rest of the 2017 season. Lunsford was officially named head coach on November 27, 2017. He finished out the 2017 season at 2-4. The overall record of 2-10 was the worst record in the program's overall history and marked the first time in the modern era that the Eagles posted back-to-back losing seasons.

In Lunsford's first official season as head coach, he led the Eagles back to a winning record and bowl eligibility, finishing the regular season 9-3 and 6-2 in conference play. Georgia Southern defeated Eastern Michigan 23–21 in the Camellia Bowl, giving the Eagles their first 10-win season since the FCS-to-FBS transition. In the 2019 season, the Eagles posted a 7-5 record, with a 5-3 record in conference play. The Eagles earned an invitation to the Cure Bowl, suffering their first loss in a bowl game at the hands of Liberty. In the 2020 season, the Eagles posted an identical 7-5 record, dropping to 4-4 conference play. Lunsford's team capped the season with an impressive 38-3 victory over the Louisiana Tech Bulldogs in the New Orleans Bowl.

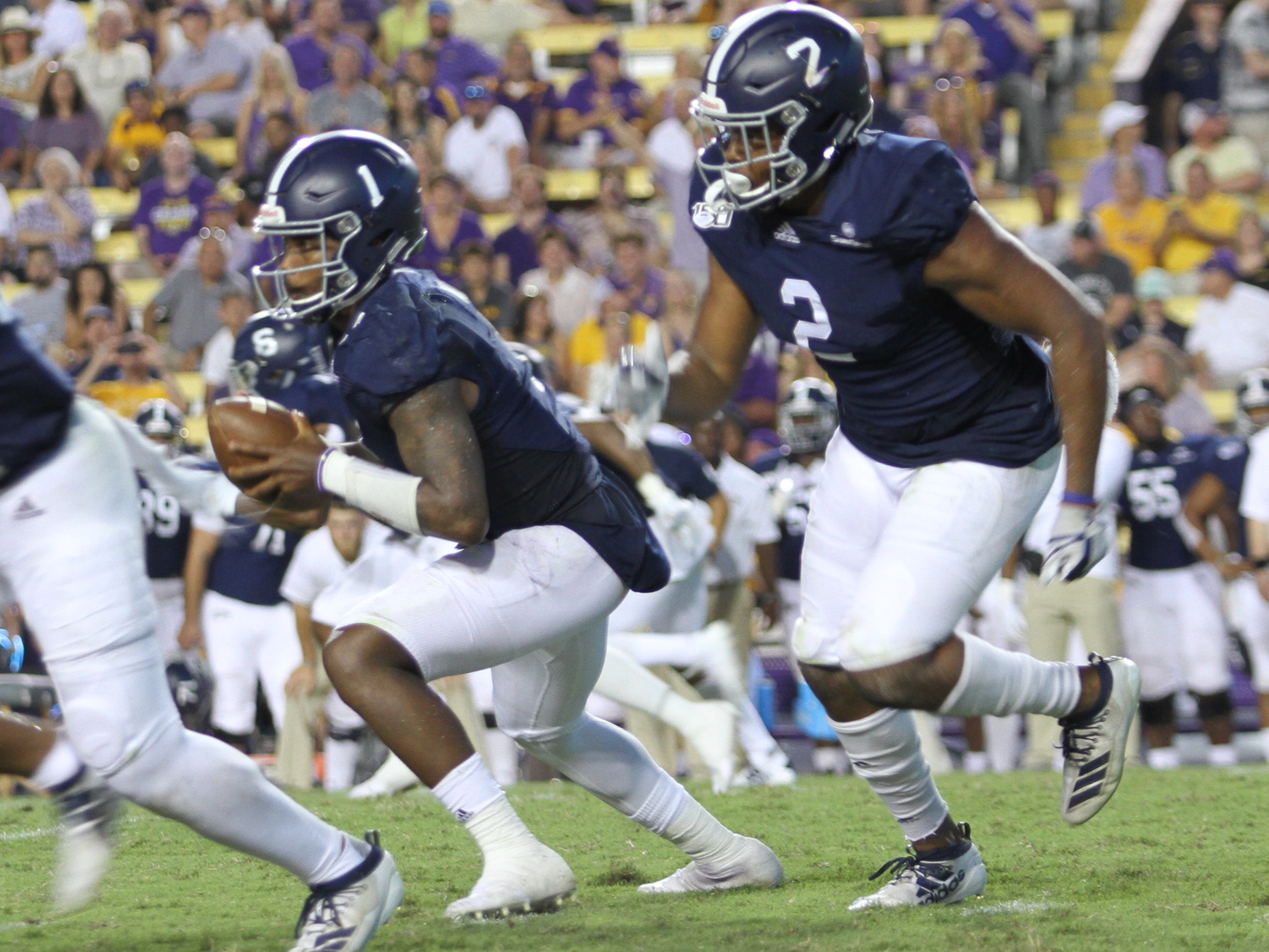
Georgia Southern playing at Tiger Stadium in 2019

The team's fortunes changed in 2021, when a 1-3 start to the season led to Lunsford's firing. Cornerbacks coach Kevin Whitley took over as interim head coach. The Eagles ultimately posted a 3-9 record, the team's third losing season since transitioning to the FBS, and the second-worst season in the modern era.

=== Clay Helton (2022–present) ===
On November 2, 2021, Georgia Southern hired Clay Helton, former head coach of the USC Trojans, as the new head coach. On September 10, 2022, Clay Helton led Georgia Southern to a 45-42 upset victory over Nebraska, earning national attention. The victory marked the second time that Georgia Southern has beaten a Power 5 school and the first time since the Eagles defeated Florida in 2013.

== Conference affiliations ==
Georgia Southern joined the Sun Belt Conference in 2014.

- Independent (1924–1941, 1982–1991)
- Southern Conference (1992–2013)
- Sun Belt Conference (2014–present)

== Championships ==
=== National championships ===
Year	Coach	Selector	Record	Score	Opponent
1985	Erk Russell	NCAA Division I-AA Football Championship Game	13–2	44–42	Furman
1986	Erk Russell	NCAA Division I-AA Football Championship Game	13–2	48–21	Arkansas State
1989	Erk Russell	NCAA Division I-AA Football Championship Game	15–0	37–34	Stephen F. Austin
1990	Tim Stowers	NCAA Division I-AA Football Championship Game	12–3	36–13	Nevada
1999	Paul Johnson	NCAA Division I-AA Football Championship Game	13–2	59–24	Youngstown State
2000	Paul Johnson	NCAA Division I-AA Football Championship Game	13–2	27–25	Montana

- 1985 – Coach Erk Russell and the Eagles won their first national championship vs. Furman University in the Tacoma Dome in Tacoma, Washington. Quarterback Tracy Ham threw for 419 yards and rushed for another 90 to overcome a 28–6 deficit.
- 1986 – The Eagles returned to Tacoma to defeat the Arkansas State Indians. Tracy Ham earned 486 rushing and passing yards and three touchdowns.
- 1989 – In Erk Russell's final game, the Eagles defeated Stephen F. Austin in Statesboro, Georgia, in front of 25,725 fans to complete a perfect 15–0 season. Quarterback Raymond Gross engineered 17 fourth-quarter points, including a game-winning field goal with 1:41 remaining in the game.
- 1990 – Tim Stowers' Eagles win their fourth national championship vs. Nevada
- 1999 – Paul Johnson won his first national championship in Chattanooga, Tennessee, vs. Youngstown State in Jim Tressel's last national championship game as a Penguin (Jim Tressel's last game as a Penguin was against the Richmond Spiders in the playoffs in 2000). Adrian Peterson ran for a championship game record 247 yards on 25 carries and scored three touchdowns.
- 2000 – The Eagles defeated the Montana Grizzlies to win their sixth and final FCS championship.

National runners-up

- 1988 – The Eagles lost to Furman in Pocatello, Idaho.
- 1998 – In Paul Johnson's first national championship game, the Eagles lost to UMass.

=== Conference championships ===
Year	Conference	Coach	Overall record	Conference record
1993	Southern Conference	Tim Stowers	10–3	7–1
1997	Southern Conference	Paul Johnson	10–3	7–1
1998	Southern Conference	Paul Johnson	14–1	8–0
1999†	Southern Conference	Paul Johnson	13–2	7–1
2000	Southern Conference	Paul Johnson	13–2	7–1
2001†	Southern Conference	Paul Johnson	12–2	7–1
2002	Southern Conference	Mike Sewak	11–3	7–1
2004†	Southern Conference	Mike Sewak	10–3	6–1
2011	Southern Conference	Jeff Monken	11–3	7–1
2012†	Southern Conference	Jeff Monken	10–4	6–2
2014	Sun Belt Conference	Willie Fritz	9–3	8–0

† Co-championship

== Postseason ==
=== Bowl games ===
The Eagles have participated in eight bowl games with a record of 4–4.

Season	Coach	Bowl	Opponent	Result
2015	Dell McGee	GoDaddy Bowl	Bowling Green	W 58–27
2018	Chad Lunsford	Camellia Bowl	Eastern Michigan	W 23–21
2019	Chad Lunsford	Cure Bowl	Liberty	L 16–23
2020	Chad Lunsford	New Orleans Bowl	Louisiana Tech	W 38–3
2022	Clay Helton	Camellia Bowl	Buffalo	L 21–23
2023	Clay Helton	Myrtle Beach Bowl	Ohio	L 21–41
2024	Clay Helton	New Orleans Bowl	Sam Houston	L 26–31
2025	Clay Helton	Birmingham Bowl	Appalachian State	W 29–10

=== Division I-AA/FCS Playoffs results ===
The Eagles have made nineteen appearances in the Division I-AA/FCS playoffs, with an overall record of 45–13. They are six time national champions (1985, 1986, 1989, 1990, 1999, 2000) and two time national runner-ups (1988, 1998).

Season	Coach	Playoff	Opponent	Result
1985	Erk Russell	First Round; Quarterfinals; Semifinals; National Championship Game	Jackson State; Middle Tennessee State; Northern Iowa; Furman	W 27–0; W 28–21; W 40–33; W 44–42
1986	Erk Russell	First Round; Quarterfinals; Semifinals; National Championship Game	North Carolina A&T; Nicholls State; Nevada; Arkansas State	W 52–21; W 55–31; W 48–38; W 48–21
1987	Erk Russell	First Round; Quarterfinals	Maine; Appalachian State	W 31–28 ^{OT} L 0–19
1988	Erk Russell	First Round; Quarterfinals; Semifinals; National Championship Game	The Citadel; Stephen F. Austin; Eastern Kentucky; Furman	W 38–20; W 27–6; W 21–17; L 12–17
1989	Erk Russell	First Round; Quarterfinals; Semifinals; National Championship Game	Villanova; Middle Tennessee State; Montana; Stephen F. Austin	W 52–36; W 45–3; W 45–15; W 37–34
1990	Tim Stowers	First Round; Quarterfinals; Semifinals; National Championship Game	The Citadel; Idaho; Central Florida; Nevada	W 31–0; W 28–27; W 44–7; W 36–13
1993	Tim Stowers	First Round; Quarterfinals	Eastern Kentucky; Youngstown State	W 14–12; L 14–34
1995	Tim Stowers	First Round; Quarterfinals	Troy State; Montana	W 24–21; L 0–45
1997	Paul Johnson	First Round; Quarterfinals	Florida A&M; Delaware	W 52–37; L 7–16
1998	Paul Johnson	First Round; Quarterfinals; Semifinals; National Championship Game	Colgate; Connecticut; Western Illinois; Massachusetts	W 49–28; W 52–30; W 42–14; L 43–55
1999	Paul Johnson	First Round; Quarterfinals; Semifinals; National Championship Game	Northern Arizona; Massachusetts; Illinois State; Youngstown State	W 72–29; W 38–21; W 31–17; W 59–24
2000	Paul Johnson	First Round; Quarterfinals; Semifinals; National Championship Game	McNeese State; Hofstra; Delaware; Montana	W 42–17; W 48–20; W 27–18; W 27–25
2001	Paul Johnson	First Round; Quarterfinals; Semifinals	Florida A&M; Appalachian State; Furman	W 60–35; W 38–24; L 17–34
2002	Mike Sewak	First Round; Quarterfinals; Semifinals	Bethune-Cookman; Maine; WKU	W 34–0; W 31–7; L 28–31
2004	Mike Sewak	First Round	New Hampshire	L 23–27
2005	Mike Sewak	First Round	Texas State	L 35–50
2010	Jeff Monken	First Round; Second Round; Quarterfinals; Semifinals	South Carolina State; William & Mary; Wofford; Delaware	W 41–16; W 31–15; W 23–20; L 10–27
2011	Jeff Monken	Second Round; Quarterfinals; Semifinals	Old Dominion; Maine; North Dakota State	W 55–48; W 35–23; L 7–35
2012	Jeff Monken	Second Round; Quarterfinals; Semifinals	Central Arkansas; Old Dominion; North Dakota State	W 24–16; W 49–35; L 20–23

== Head coaches ==
No.	Coach	Alma mater	Seasons	Years	Games	Record	Pct.
1	E. G. Cromartie	Mercer	3	1924–1926	13	7–5–1	.577
2	Hugh A. Woodle	Clemson	2	1927–1928	18	11–6–1	.639
3	Crook Smith	Mercer	13	1929–1941	117	44–66–7	.406
4	Erk Russell	Auburn	8	1982–1989	106	83–22–1	.788
5	Tim Stowers	Auburn	6	1990–1995	74	51–23	.689
6	Frank Ellwood	Ohio State	1	1996	11	4–7	.364
7	Paul Johnson	Western Carolina	5	1997–2001	72	62–10	.861
8	Mike Sewak	Virginia	4	2002–2005	49	35–14	.714
9	Brian VanGorder	Wayne State (MI)	1	2006	11	3–8	.273
10	Chris Hatcher	Valdosta State	3	2007–2009	33	18–15	.545
11	Jeff Monken	Millikin	4	2010–2013	54	38–16	.704
12	Willie Fritz	Pittsburg State	2	2014–2015	24	17–7	.708
Int.	Dell McGee	Auburn	<1	2015	1	1–0	1.000
13	Tyson Summers	Presbyterian	2	2016–2017	18	5–13	.278
14	Chad Lunsford	Georgia College & State	4	2017–2021	47	28–19	.596
Int.	Kevin Whitley	Georgia Southern	<1	2021	8	2–6	.250
15	Clay Helton	Houston	4	2022–present	52	27–25	.519

== Rivalries ==
=== Appalachian State ===
Since Georgia Southern joined Appalachian State in the Southern Conference in 1993, the schools have played each other annually in football. Both teams are now members of the Sun Belt Conference. Appalachian State leads the series 21–19–1 through the 2025 season.

=== Georgia State ===
Georgia Southern and Georgia State have competed against each other in football since 2014. Georgia Southern leads the series 7–6 through the 2026 season.

== Traditions ==
=== Nickname ===
The athletics teams of Georgia Southern University are referred to as the Eagles. However, the school has gone by a number of different nicknames. From as early as 1907 the teams of the then First District A&M school were referred to as the Culture to reflect the agricultural background of the school. From 1924 to 1941, the nickname was the Blue Tide. After World War II, athletic teams were referred to as the Professors reflecting the school's status as a teacher-training college. However, in 1959 when the school was renamed Georgia Southern College, a student vote was held to determine the new mascot; among the 104 entries, voters chose Eagles over Colonels by a narrow margin. In 1997, a contest was held to select the official name of the mascot, incoming freshman Imen Edmond and Heidi Barber won with the name GUS.

=== Beautiful Eagle Creek ===
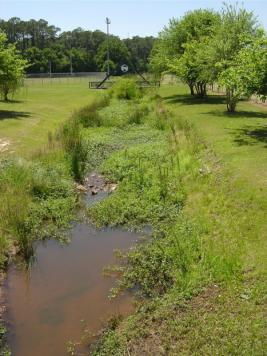
Beautiful Eagle Creek

When Georgia Southern resurrected football in 1981, it lacked tradition. A drainage ditch that the team had to cross several times a day during football practice came to be called Beautiful Eagle Creek by Coach Erk Russell. When the Eagles traveled to Northern Iowa during the 1985 playoffs, Russell took along a jug of this Eagle Creek water to sprinkle on the field.

=== The Hugo Bowl ===
In 1989, ESPN was to broadcast a Thursday Night Football game between Georgia Southern and the Middle Tennessee State Blue Raiders. However, Hurricane Hugo, a Category 4 storm, was headed straight toward the coast of Georgia. Hugo ranked as the 11th most intense hurricane at time of landfall to strike the United States in the 20th century, with the highest ever recorded storm surge on the East Coast. Nevertheless, the decision was made to continue with the game. For safety purposes, an open line was kept between the press box at Paulson Stadium and the National Hurricane Center in Florida. The Eagles went on to defeat MTSU by a score of 26–0 in a classic that will forever be known in Eagle history as the Hugo Bowl.

This was the first night game played at Paulson Stadium. Temporary lighting was used for the game because the stadium was not outfitted with permanent lighting until the 1994 season. Many feared that the booms used to hoist the stadium lights would tip over due to the heavy wind. While it was initially expected to be a sellout crowd, and the official attendance was listed as 16,449, the actual attendance was in the neighborhood of only 3,000 due to the approaching storm.

=== Plain uniforms ===
The uniforms consist of plain white pants, blue helmets with a white stripe down the middle and the player's number on the sides, and blue jerseys. This minimalist look was adopted more or less out of necessity. When the program was revived in 1982, the school did not have a large budget. Indeed, the equipment budget was so limited that only plain white practice pants could be purchased. Hence, the practice pants doubled as game pants. Russell bought solid blue helmets and had the players put a piece of tape down the middle. With the subsequent success of the Eagles, the basic design has remained the same, with the only real changes in recent years being a white stripe down the middle of the helmets and the addition of names to the backs of the jerseys. Sports Illustrated has ranked the uniforms as being the third best in college football.

=== Yellow school buses ===
When the football program was restarted in 1981, money was tight. In fact, there was not enough money to furnish transportation to home games. The Bulloch County school system sold two buses for a dollar each to the team. The buses have been used by the team ever since as transportation to Allen E. Paulson Stadium. This tradition continued even when the Eagles rose to powerhouse status. This briefly ended with the arrival of Brian VanGorder, following his scrapping of the Eagles' triple-option rushing attack. The tradition was revived after VanGorder's departure.

=== Black flag ===
In 2011, the team took the field leading with a solid black flag. The flag symbolized their motto "No quarter given, no quarter taken." During the game it was placed behind the bench. The flag was carried by safety Derek Heyden, who suffered a career ending neck injury early in the season.

=== The Eagle's Elbow ===
During Chad Lunsford's tenure, the coach celebrated important victories by brandishing a steel chair adorned with the fallen opponent's logo, slamming the chair on the locker room floor, and performing an elbow drop on the chair. The tradition was started following Lunsford's first win, a 52-point shutout of South Alabama, after the team had gone winless in the first 9 games of the 2017 season.

=== Eagle Flights ===
Live eagle appearances have been a part of Georgia Southern home games in some form since the 1990s, beginning with Glory, a female bald eagle unable to fly, who appeared at university events, including three of Georgia Southern's national championship games, until 2007. Glory died in November 2021. In 2004, Georgia Southern University rescued a young male bald eagle from Maitland, Florida that had fallen out of his nest in the first weeks of his life. With their help, the eagle, named Freedom, survived a permanent injury to his beak and a near-fatal infection. From 2007 to 2024, prior to each home game, after The Star-Spangled Banner was played by the Southern Pride Marching Band, Freedom was released to fly around Paulson Stadium from the top of the press box. Freedom would fly over the crowd and fans, landing on the arm of Steve Hein, executive Director of the Lamar Q Ball, Jr. Raptor Center, standing on the playing surface. Freedom died March 29th, 2025 at the age of 20. A statue memorializing Freedom was placed outside the entrance to Paulson Stadium on September 12th, 2025.

== Wins over ranked opponents ==
Season	Opponent	Result	Location	Date
2018	#25 Appalachian State	34–14	Allen E. Paulson Stadium	October 25, 2018
2019	#20 Appalachian State	24–21	Kidd Brewer Stadium	October 31, 2019
2022	#25 James Madison	45–38	Allen E. Paulson Stadium	October 15, 2022

== Wins over power five opponents ==
Season	Opponent	Conference	Result	Location	Date
2013	Florida	SEC	26–20	Ben Hill Griffin Stadium	November 23, 2013
2022	Nebraska	Big Ten	45–42	Memorial Stadium	September 10, 2022

== Stadium ==
Georgia Southern's home football games are played at Allen E. Paulson Stadium. The stadium was dedicated on September 29, 1984, and has an official seating capacity of 25,000. Prior to the Eagles' first FBS season, Paulson Stadium underwent a major expansion project that included the addition of a new football operations center and more than 6,000 new seats. The stadium's attendance record of 26,483 was set on September 30, 2023, when the Eagles beat Coastal Carolina 38-28. Prior to the opening of Paulson Stadium and becoming a full FCS member in 1984, the Eagles played their first two modern era seasons at Womack Stadium on the campus of Statesboro High School.

== Awards ==
The Eagles have won six NCAA FCS national championships, a mark surpassed only by the North Dakota State Bison.

=== Walter Payton Award ===
Georgia Southern is one of five schools to have multiple Walter Payton Award winners. The award, which honors the top offensive player in the FCS, was won by running back Adrian Peterson in 1999 and quarterback Jayson Foster in 2007.

=== Eddie Robinson Award ===
Three Georgia Southern coaches have won the AFCA Coach of the Year Award, given to the top coach in FCS. Erk Russell won it in 1989, Tim Stowers in 1990, and Paul Johnson in 1998.

== Players ==
=== Retired numbers ===
Georgia Southern Eagles retired numbers
No.	Player	Pos.	Tenure	Ref.
3	Adrian Peterson	RB	1998–2001	
8	Tracy Ham	QB	1982–1986	

=== Notable alumni ===
Player	Class	Distinction(s)
Tracy Ham	1987	Member of the College Football Hall of Fame; Former CFL QB for the Edmonton Eskimos; 2 × Grey Cup Champion; 1 × Grey Cup MVP; 1 × CFL Most Outstanding Player; 1 × CFL All-Star; NFL Draft: Round 9 / Pick 240
Fred Stokes	1987	Former NFL DE for the Los Angeles Rams, Washington Redskins; Super Bowl Champion XXVI; NFL Draft: Round 12 / Pick 332
Kiwaukee Thomas	2000	Former NFL DB for the Jacksonville Jaguars; NFL Draft: Round 5 / Pick 159
Rob Bironas	2001	Former NFL K for the Tennessee Titans; NFL Record Holder: Most FGs in single game - 8; 1 × NFL Pro-Bowler; 1 × NFL Player of The Month; 3 × NFL Player of The Week
Adrian Peterson	2002	Member of the College Football Hall of Fame; Former NFL RB for the Chicago Bears; 1999 Walter Payton Award Winner; FCS Record Holder: Most Career Rushing Yards - 6,559; FCS Record Holder: Most Career Rushing TDs - 84
Jayson Foster	2008	2007 Walter Payton Award Winner
J. J. Wilcox	2013	Former NFL DB for the Dallas Cowboys, Tampa Bay Buccaneers, Atlanta Falcons; NFL Draft: Round 3 / Pick 80
Jerick McKinnon	2014	NFL RB for the Minnesota Vikings, San Francisco 49ers, Kansas City Chiefs; Super Bowl LVII Champion; NFL Draft: Round 3 / Pick 96
Edwin Jackson	2015	Former NFL LB for the Indianapolis Colts; Edwin Jackson Memorial Walk-On Tryouts held annually
Antwione Williams	2016	Former NFL LB for the Minnesota Vikings, Detroit Lions; NFL Draft: Round 5 / Pick 169
Ukeme Eligwe	2017	Former NFL LB for the Kansas City Chiefs, New York Giants, New York Jets, Las Vegas Raiders; NFL Draft: Round 5 / Pick 183
Matt Breida	2017	NFL RB for the San Francisco 49ers, Miami Dolphins, Buffalo Bills, New York Giants; 1 × NFL FedEx Ground Player of the Week
Younghoe Koo	2017	NFL K for the San Diego Chargers, Atlanta Falcons; 2 × NFC Special Teams Player of the Week; 1 × NFL Pro-Bowler
Kindle Vildor	2020	NFL DB for the Chicago Bears; NFL Draft: Round 5 / Pick 163
Tyler Bass	2020	NFL K for the Buffalo Bills; NFL Draft: Round 6 / Pick 188
Raymond Johnson III	2021	NFL DE for the New York Giants

== Future non-conference opponents ==
Announced schedules as of December 11, 2025.

2026	2027	2028	2029	2030	2031	2032	2033	2034
Charleston Southern	Samford	at Auburn	at Kentucky	Chattanooga	at Western Michigan	Kennesaw State	at Kennesaw State	Western Michigan
at Clemson	at Kansas State	at Boise State	Sam Houston	at Ole Miss	Middle Tennessee	at Middle Tennessee		
at Jacksonville State	at Houston	Fresno State	Charleston Southern	at Sam Houston				
Houston	Eastern Michigan		at Eastern Michigan					
