= 2020 Georgia Southern Eagles football team =

American college football season

2020 Georgia Southern Eagles football

New Orleans Bowl champion

New Orleans Bowl, W 38–3 vs. Louisiana Tech
- Conference: Sun Belt Conference
- East Division
- Record: 8–5 (4–4 Sun Belt)
- Head coach: Chad Lunsford (3rd season)
- Offensive coordinator: Bob DeBesse (3rd season; first 10 games); Doug Ruse (interim; final 3 games)
- Offensive scheme: Pistol
- Defensive coordinator: Scot Sloan (3rd season)
- Base defense: 3–4
- Home stadium: Paulson Stadium

2020 Sun Belt Conference football standings
	Conf.			Overall
Team	W		L	W		L
East Division
No. 14 Coastal Carolina xy+	8	–	0	11	–	1
Appalachian State	6	–	2	9	–	3
Georgia Southern	4	–	4	8	–	5
Georgia State	4	–	4	6	–	4
Troy	3	–	4	5	–	6
West Division
No. 15 Louisiana xy+	7	–	1	10	–	1
South Alabama	3	–	5	4	–	7
Arkansas State	2	–	6	4	–	7
Texas State	2	–	6	2	–	10
Louisiana–Monroe	0	–	7	0	–	10
Championship: Louisiana at Coastal Carolina (Canceled)
+ – Conference co-champions; x – Division champion/co-champions; y – Championship game participant; Rankings from AP Poll

The 2020 Georgia Southern Eagles football team represented Georgia Southern University during the 2020 NCAA Division I FBS football season. The Eagles played their home games at Paulson Stadium in Statesboro, Georgia, and competed in the East Division of the Sun Belt Conference. They were led by third-year head coach Chad Lunsford.

== Preseason ==
=== Sun Belt coaches' poll ===
The Sun Belt coaches poll was released on August 25, 2020. Georgia Southern was picked to finish second in the East Division.

=== Preseason All-Sun Belt teams ===
The Eagles had five players selected to the preseason All−Sun Belt teams; three from the defense and two from special teams.

Defense

1st team

- Raymond Johnson – SR, Defensive Line
- Rashad Byrd – R-SR, linebacker
- Kenderick Duncan Jr. – R-JR, defensive back

Special teams

1st team

- Wesley Kennedy III – SR, return specialist

2nd team

- Anthony Beck II – R-SO, punter

== Schedule ==
Georgia Southern had games against Boise State and Ole Miss, which were canceled due to the COVID-19 pandemic. They added a November game with Army on August 11. On October 7, the game against Appalachian State scheduled for October 14 was postponed to December 12 due to COVID-19 positive tests within the Mountaineers' football program.

Date	Time	Opponent	Site	TV	Result	Attendance
September 12	3:30 p.m.	Campbell*	Paulson Stadium; Statesboro, GA	ESPNU	W 27–26	5,789
September 26	12:00 p.m.	at No. 19 Louisiana	Cajun Field; Lafayette, LA	ESPN2	L 18–20	5,585
October 3	7:00 p.m.	at Louisiana–Monroe	Malone Stadium; Monroe, LA	ESPN+	W 35–30	6,338
October 17	4:00 p.m.	UMass*	Paulson Stadium; Statesboro, GA	ESPN2	W 41–0	4,856
October 24	12:00 p.m.	at No. 25 Coastal Carolina	Brooks Stadium; Conway, SC	ESPNU	L 14–28	5,000
October 29	7:30 p.m.	South Alabama	Paulson Stadium; Statesboro, GA	ESPN	W 24–17	3,457
November 7	1:00 p.m.	Troy^{†}	Paulson Stadium; Statesboro, GA	ESPN3	W 20–13	5,012
November 14	3:00 p.m.	Texas State	Paulson Stadium; Statesboro, GA	ESPN3	W 40–38	4,478
November 21	12:00 p.m.	at Army*	Michie Stadium; West Point, NY	CBSSN	L 27–28	5,078
November 28	12:00 p.m.	at Georgia State	Center Parc Stadium; Atlanta, GA (Modern Day Hate)	ESPN3	L 24–30	4,523
December 5	6:00 p.m.	Florida Atlantic*	Paulson Stadium; Statesboro, GA	ESPN+	W 20–3	3,867
December 12	6:00 p.m.	Appalachian State	Paulson Stadium; Statesboro, GA (rivalry)	ESPN3	L 26–34	6,228
December 23	3:30 p.m.	vs. Louisiana Tech*	Mercedes-Benz Superdome; New Orleans, LA (New Orleans Bowl)	ESPN	W 38–3	3,000
*Non-conference game; ^{†}Homecoming; Rankings from AP Poll and CFP Rankings after November 24 released prior to game; All times are in Eastern time

== Game summaries ==
=== Campbell ===
Campbell at Georgia Southern

Team	1	2	3	4	Total
Fighting Camels	13	0	7	6	26
• Eagles	3	3	7	14	27

- Date: September 12, 2020
- Location: Paulson Stadium
  Statesboro, GA
- Game start: 4:14 p.m. EDT
- Elapsed time: 3 hours and 35 minutes
- Game attendance: 5,789
- Referee: Trennis Livingston
- TV announcers (ESPNU): Bill Roth (play-by-play) and Rene Ingoglia (analyst)

Scoring summary
1	13:03	CAM	Bryant Barr 10-yard rush (Robert Brown kick) (6 plays, 75 yards, 1:57)	CAM 7–0
1	08:37	GASO	Alex Raynor 41-yard field goal (9 plays, 41 yards, 4:26)	CAM 7–3
1	06:31	CAM	Jai Williams 40-yard pass from Hajj-Malik Williams (Robert Brown PAT failed) (4 plays, 75 yards, 2:06)	CAM 13–3
2	04:50	GASO	Alex Raynor 39-yard field goal (13 plays, 77 yards, 5:59)	CAM 13–6
3	13:38	CAM	Hajj-Malik Williams 8-yard rush (Robert Brown kick) (4 plays, 26 yards, 1:15)	CAM 20–6
3	07:32	GASO	D. J. Butler 1-yard pass from Shai Werts (Alex Raynor kick) (10 plays, 75 yards, 6:06)	CAM 20–13
4	13:50	GASO	J. D. King 4-yard rush (Alex Raynor kick) (2 plays, 9 yards, 0:47)	TIE 20–20
4	06:42	GASO	Shai Werts 41-yard rush (Alex Raynor kick) (6 plays, 95 yards, 3:27)	GASO 27–20
4	00:15	CAM	Jalen Kelsey 20-yard pass from Hajj-Malik Williams (Hajj-Malik Williams two-point conversion pass attempt failed) (8 plays, 64 yards, 1:44)	GASO 27–26

Statistics	Campbell	Georgia Southern
First downs	17	20
Total yards	380	346
Rushing yards	143	284
Passing yards	237	62
Turnovers	0	1
Time of possession	26:04	33:56

Team	Category	Player	Statistics
Campbell	Passing	Hajj-Malik Williams	17/27, 237 yards, 2 TDs
Campbell	Rushing	Hajj-Malik Williams	11 carries, 73 yards, 1 TD
Campbell	Receiving	Jai Williams	4 receptions, 72 yards, 1 TD
Georgia Southern	Passing	Shai Werts	7/13, 53 yards, 1 TD
Georgia Southern	Rushing	Shai Werts	14 carries, 155 yards, 1 TD
Georgia Southern	Receiving	D. J. Butler	3 receptions, 22 yards, 1 TD

=== At Louisiana ===
Georgia Southern at Louisiana

Team	1	2	3	4	Total
Eagles	0	7	3	8	18
• No. 19 Ragin' Cajuns	0	7	3	10	20

- Date: September 26, 2020
- Location: Cajun Field
  Lafayette, LA
- Game start: 11:01 a.m. CDT
- Elapsed time: 3 hours and 19 minutes
- Game attendance: 5,585
- Game weather: 79 °F (26 °C) • Weather: Sunny, Humid • Wind: Calm
- Referee: Wayne Winkler
- TV announcers (ESPN2): Beth Mowins (play–by–play), Kirk Morrison (analyst), and Dawn Davenport (sideline reporter)

Scoring summary
2	14:53	GASO	J. D. King 2-yard rush (Alex Raynor kick) (5 plays, 85 yards, 2:49)	GASO 7–0
2	09:25	LA	Trey Ragas 10-yard rush (Nate Snyder kick) (9 plays, 83 yards, 5:22)	TIE 7–7
3	05:49	GASO	Alex Raynor 27-yard field goal (13 plays, 66 yards, 7:34)	GASO 10–7
3	00:30	LA	Nate Snyder 25-yard field goal (12 plays, 67 yards, 5:19)	TIE 10–10
4	10:34	LA	Errol Rogers Jr. 27-yard pass from Levi Lewis (Nate Snyder kick) (5 plays, 58 yards, 2:46)	LA 17–10
4	00:54	GASO	Khaleb Hood 28-yard pass from Shai Werts (Shai Werts two-point conversion pass to Darion Anderson) (5 plays, 61 yards, 0:40)	GASO 18–17
4	00:00	LA	Nate Snyder 53-yard field goal (7 plays, 39 yards, 0:54)	LA 20–18

Statistics	Georgia Southern	Louisiana
First downs	21	18
Total yards	447	438
Rushing yards	192	148
Passing yards	255	290
Turnovers	2	1
Time of possession	35:14	24:46

Team	Category	Player	Statistics
Georgia Southern	Passing	Shai Werts	11/18, 255 yards, 1 TD, 1 INT
Georgia Southern	Rushing	J. D. King	24 carries, 100 yards, 1 TD
Georgia Southern	Receiving	Wesley Kennedy III	2 receptions, 105 yards
Louisiana	Passing	Levi Lewis	18/32, 290 yards, 1 TD, 1 INT
Louisiana	Rushing	Chris Smith	4 carries, 54 yards
Louisiana	Receiving	Peter LeBlanc	3 receptions, 64 yards

=== At Louisiana–Monroe ===
Georgia Southern at Louisiana–Monroe

Team	1	2	3	4	Total
• Eagles	7	14	14	0	35
Warhawks	3	14	6	7	30

- Date: October 3, 2020
- Location: Malone Stadium
  Monroe, LA
- Game start: 7:05 p.m. EDT
- Elapsed time: 3 hours and 15 hours
- Game attendance: 6,338
- Game weather: 72 °F (22 °C) • Weather: Clear • Wind: 4 ESE MPH
- Referee: Tre. Livingston
- TV announcers (ESPN+): Chris Harris (play–by–play) and Mike Hammett (analyst)

Scoring summary
1	11:25	GASO	J. D. King 3-yard rush (Alex Raynor kick) (3 plays, 68 yards, 1:27)	GASO 7–0
1	03:21	ULM	Davis Hughes 34-yard field goal (9 plays, 40 yards, 4:14)	GASO 7–3
2	12:47	GASO	Wesley Kennedy III 4-yard rush (Alex Raynor kick) (11 plays, 81 yards, 5:34)	GASO 14–3
2	10:04	ULM	Josh Johnson 26-yard rush (Davis Hughes kick) (6 plays, 72 yards, 2:43)	GASO 14–10
2	01:37	GASO	Wesley Kennedy III 5-yard rush (Alex Raynor kick) (15 plays, 75 yards, 8:27)	GASO 21–10
2	00:00	ULM	Malik Jackson 2-yard pass from Colby Suits (Davis Hughes kick) (11 plays, 75 yards, 1:37)	GASO 21–17
3	10:19	GASO	Logan Wright 17-yard rush (Alex Raynor kick) (9 plays, 75 yards, 4:41)	GASO 28–17
3	05:30	GASO	Rashad Byrd 7-yard blocked punt returned (Alex Raynor kick) (3 plays, 0 yards, 0:55)	GASO 35–17
3	00:29	ULM	Josh Johnson 2-yard pass from Colby Suits (Davis Hughes PAT failed) (13 plays, 73 yards, 5:01)	GASO 35–23
4	04:59	ULM	Josh Johnson 2-yard rush (Davis Hughes kick) (8 plays, 80 yards, 3:13)	GASO 35–30

Statistics	Georgia Southern	Louisiana–Monroe
First downs	19	24
Total yards	369	426
Rushing yards	340	92
Passing yards	29	334
Turnovers	0	0
Time of possession	34:53	25:07

Team	Category	Player	Statistics
Georgia Southern	Passing	Shai Werts	3/7, 29 yards
Georgia Southern	Rushing	J. D. King	21 carries, 196 yards, 1 TD
Georgia Southern	Receiving	Beau Johnson	1 reception, 17 yards
Louisiana–Monroe	Passing	Colby Suits	31/54, 334 yards, 2 TDs
Louisiana–Monroe	Rushing	Colby Suits	7 carries, 51 yards
Louisiana–Monroe	Receiving	Tyler Lamm	5 receptions, 66 yards

=== UMass ===
Massachusetts at Georgia Southern

Team	1	2	3	4	Total
Minutemen	0	0	0	0	0
• Eagles	14	14	10	3	41

- Date: October 17, 2020
- Location: Paulson Stadium
  Statesboro, GA
- Game start: 4:07 p.m. EDT
- Elapsed time: 3 hours and 12 minutes
- Game attendance: 4,856
- Game weather: 65 °F (18 °C)
- Referee: Wayne Winkler
- TV announcers (ESPN2): Bill Roth (play–by–play) and Dustin Fox (analyst)

Scoring summary
1	12:18	GASO	Malik Murray 47-yard pass from Shai Werts (Alex Raynor kick) (5 plays, 75 yards, 2:42)	GASO 7–0
1	08:14	GASO	Beau Johnson 8-yard pass from Shai Werts (Alex Raynor kick) (7 plays, 39 yards, 1:57)	GASO 14–0
2	09:12	GASO	Beau Johnson 10-yard pass from Shai Werts (Alex Raynor kick) (7 plays, 50 yards, 4:13)	GASO 21–0
2	01:39	GASO	Shai Werts 4-yard rush (Alex Raynor kick) (8 plays, 60 yards, 5:01)	GASO 28–0
3	13:08	GASO	Alex Raynor 27-yard field goal (5 plays, 10 yards, 1:25)	GASO 31–0
3	06:40	GASO	Wesley Kennedy III 56-yard rush (Alex Raynor kick) (2 plays, 60 yards, 0:55)	GASO 38–0
4	02:34	GASO	Alex Raynor 31-yard field goal (4 plays, 8 yards, 2:18)	GASO 41–0

Statistics	UMass	Georgia Southern
First downs	10	20
Total yards	191	436
Rushing yards	111	308
Passing yards	80	128
Turnovers	2	1
Time of possession	29:09	30:51

Team	Category	Player	Statistics
UMass	Passing	Mike Fallon	7/12, 41 yards, 1 INT
UMass	Rushing	Will Koch	4 carries, 41 yards
UMass	Receiving	Samuel Emilus	4 receptions, 28 yards
Georgia Southern	Passing	Shai Werts	11/16, 128 yards, 3 TDs
Georgia Southern	Rushing	Wesley Kennedy III	6 carries, 106 yards, 1 TD
Georgia Southern	Receiving	Malik Murray	4 receptions, 68 yards, 1 TD

=== At Coastal Carolina ===
Georgia Southern at Coastal Carolina

Team	1	2	3	4	Total
Eagles	7	7	0	0	14
• No. 25 Chanticleers	7	7	0	14	28

- Date: October 24, 2020
- Location: Brooks Stadium
  Conway, SC
- Game start: 12:02 p.m. EDT
- Elapsed time: 3 hours and 20 minutes
- Game attendance: 5,000
- Game weather: 75 °F (24 °C) • Weather: Fair • Wind: N 2 MPH
- Referee: T. Livingston
- TV announcers (ESPNU): Courtney Lyle (play–by–play) and Rene Ingoglia (analyst)

Scoring summary
1	07:10	CCU	Sam Denmark 72-yard pass from Fred Payton (Massimo Biscardi kick) (2 plays, 71 yards, 0:46)	CCU 7–0
1	00:57	GASO	Wesley Kennedy III 60-yard punt returned (Alex Raynor kick) (3 plays, −7 yards, 2:14)	TIE 7–7
2	08:57	CCU	Kameron Brown 2-yard pass from Fred Payton (Massimo Biscardi kick) (4 plays, 59 yards, 2:00)	CCU 14–7
2	00:24	GASO	J. D. King 5-yard rush (Alex Raynor kick) (7 plays, 54 yards, 1:07)	TIE 14–14
4	08:53	CCU	C. J. Marable 24-yard pass from Fred Payton (Massimo Biscardi kick) (5 plays, 63 yards, 2:34)	CCU 21–14
4	06:58	CCU	Reese White 20-yard rush (Massimo Biscardi kick) (1 play, 20 yards, 0:11)	CCU 28–14

Statistics	Georgia Southern	Coastal Carolina
First downs	12	20
Total yards	218	382
Rushing yards	119	130
Passing yards	99	252
Turnovers	2	2
Time of possession	27:43	32:17

Team	Category	Player	Statistics
Georgia Southern	Passing	Shai Werts	7/20, 94 yards, 2 INTs
Georgia Southern	Rushing	J. D. King	15 carries, 67 yards, 1 TD
Georgia Southern	Receiving	Malik Murray	2 receptions, 46 yards
Coastal Carolina	Passing	Fred Payton	15/28, 252 yards, 3 TDs, 2 INTs
Coastal Carolina	Rushing	Shermari Jones	5 carries, 44 yards
Coastal Carolina	Receiving	Jaivon Heiligh	5 receptions, 107 yards

=== South Alabama ===
South Alabama at Georgia Southern

Team	1	2	3	4	Total
Jaguars	3	7	7	0	17
• Eagles	0	10	0	14	24

- Date: October 29, 2020
- Location: Paulson Stadium
  Statesboro, GA
- Game start: 7:32 p.m. EDT
- Elapsed time: 3 hours and 13 minutes
- Game attendance: 3,457
- Referee: Kyle Olsen
- TV announcers (ESPN): Matt Barrie (play–by–play), Mike Golic Jr. (analyst), and Lericia Harris (sideline reporter)

Scoring summary
1	10:07	USA	Diego Guajardo 54-yard field goal (10 plays, 40 yards, 4:53)	USA 3–0
2	10:09	GASO	Alex Raynor 29-yard field goal (11 plays, 81 yards, 5:56)	TIE 3–3
2	06:05	GASO	J. D. King 13-yard rush (Alex Raynor kick) (6 plays, 52 yards, 3:00)	GASO 10–3
2	02:50	USA	Brandon Crum 3-yard pass from Desmond Trotter (Diego Guajardo kick) (8 plays, 70 yards, 3:15)	TIE 10–10
3	01:39	USA	Jalen Tolbert 12-yard pass from Desmond Trotter (Diego Guajardo kick) (6 plays, 52 yards, 2:28)	USA 17–10
4	12:57	GASO	Wesley Kennedy III 14-yard rush (Alex Raynor kick) (7 plays, 75 yards, 3:42)	TIE 17–17
4	08:02	GASO	Wesley Kennedy III 15-yard rush (Alex Raynor kick) (5 plays, 47 yards, 2:45)	GASO 24–17

Statistics	South Alabama	Georgia Southern
First downs	16	15
Total yards	264	345
Rushing yards	64	250
Passing yards	200	95
Turnovers	1	1
Time of possession	28:19	31:41

Team	Category	Player	Statistics
South Alabama	Passing	Desmond Trotter	20/27, 200 yards, 2 TDs
South Alabama	Rushing	Carlos Davis	20 carries, 70 yards
South Alabama	Receiving	Kawaan Baker	5 receptions, 65 yards
Georgia Southern	Passing	Shai Werts	5/9, 95 yards, 1 INT
Georgia Southern	Rushing	Wesley Kennedy III	13 carries, 91 yards, 2 TDs
Georgia Southern	Receiving	Malik Murray	1 reception, 38 yards

=== Troy ===
Troy at Georgia Southern

Team	1	2	3	4	Total
Trojans	0	10	3	0	13
• Eagles	0	6	14	0	20

- Date: November 7, 2020
- Location: Paulson Stadium
  Statesboro, GA
- Game start: 1:05 p.m. EST
- Elapsed time: 3 hours and 15 minutes
- Game attendance: 5,012
- Referee: Jeremy Parker
- TV announcers (ESPN3): Matt Stewart (play–by–play) and Danny Waugh (analyst)

Scoring summary
2	10:18	GASO	Alex Raynor 23-yard field goal (18 plays, 87 yards, 10:53)	GASO 3–0
2	09:25	TROY	Dell Pettus 44-yard interception returned (Evan Legassey kick) (1 play, 0 yards, 0:16)	TROY 7–3
2	02:28	GASO	Alex Raynor 35-yard field goal (12 play, 57 yards, 6:57)	TROY 7–6
2	01:05	TROY	Evan Legassey 35-yard field goal (8 play, 48 yards, 1:18)	TROY 10–6
4	08:26	TROY	Evan Legassey 20-yard field goal (8 play, 35 yards, 2:31)	TROY 13–6
4	07:37	GASO	Gerald Green 69-yard rush (Alex Raynor kick) (2 play, 75 yards, 0:49)	TIE 13–13
4	02:18	GASO	Shai Werts 5-yard rush (Alex Raynor kick) (8 play, 85 yards, 4:19)	GASO 20–13

Statistics	Troy	Georgia Southern
First downs	14	20
Total yards	235	411
Rushing yards	34	326
Passing yards	201	85
Turnovers	2	1
Time of possession	17:13	42:47

Team	Category	Player	Statistics
Troy	Passing	Jacob Free	21/47, 201 yards, 2 INTs
Troy	Rushing	Jamontez Woods	3 carries, 23 yards
Troy	Receiving	Kaylon Geiger	6 receptions, 49 yards
Georgia Southern	Passing	Shai Werts	12/13, 85 yards, 1 INT
Georgia Southern	Rushing	Gerald Green	10 carries, 109 yards, 1 TD
Georgia Southern	Receiving	NaJee Thompson	1 reception, 35 yards

=== Texas State ===
Texas State at Georgia Southern

Team	1	2	3	4	Total
Bobcats	7	14	7	10	38
• Eagles	17	10	3	10	40

- Date: November 14, 2020
- Location: Paulson Stadium
  Statesboro, GA
- Game start: 3:35 p.m. EST
- Elapsed time: 3 hours and 11 minutes
- Game attendance: 4,478
- Referee: T. Livingston
- TV announcers (ESPN3): Matt Stewart (play–by–play) and Danny Waugh (analyst)

Scoring summary
1	12:59	GASO	Shai Werts 1-yard rush (Alex Raynor kick) (2 plays, 7 yards, 0:42)	GASO 7–0
1	12:44	TXST	Jeremiah Haydel 97-yard kickoff returned (Seth Keller kick) (0 plays, 0 yards, 0:00)	TIE 7–7
1	08:25	GASO	Shai Werts 29-yard rush (Alex Raynor kick) (8 plays, 75 yards, 4:19)	GASO 14–7
1	06:05	GASO	Alex Raynor 34-yard field goal (4 plays, −5 yards, 2:13)	GASO 17–7
2	12:09	GASO	Alex Raynor 41-yard field goal (5 plays, 42 yards, 2:44)	GASO 20–7
2	07:30	TXST	Calvin Hill 11-yard rush (Seth Keller kick) (11 plays, 75 yards, 4:39)	GASO 20–14
2	07:13	TXST	Marcell Barbee 43-yard pass from Tyler Vitt (Seth Keller kick) (1 play, 43 yards, 0:07)	TXST 21–20
2	01:08	GASO	Shai Werts 2-yard rush (Alex Raynor kick) (5 plays, 41 yards, 2:30)	GASO 27–21
3	07:09	GASO	Alex Raynor 39-yard field goal (14 plays, 53 yards, 7:51)	GASO 30–21
3	06:09	TXST	Javen Banks 59-yard pass from Brady McBride (Seth Keller kick) (3 plays, 65 yards, 1:06)	GASO 30–28
4	14:22	GASO	Wesley Kennedy III 6-yard rush (Alex Raynor kick) (12 plays, 75 yards, 6:41)	GASO 37–28
4	10:18	TXST	Seth Keller 27-yard field goal (10 plays, 57 yards, 3:58)	GASO 37–31
4	04:15	GASO	Alex Raynor 20-yard field goal (10 plays, 76 yards, 5:57)	GASO 40–31
4	02:50	TXST	Jah'Marae Sheread 24-yard pass from Brady McBride (Seth Keller kick) (4 plays, 79 yards, 1:19)	GASO 40–38

Statistics	Texas State	Georgia Southern
First downs	18	20
Total yards	299	437
Rushing yards	30	386
Passing yards	269	51
Turnovers	3	3
Time of possession	18:41	41:19

Team	Category	Player	Statistics
Texas State	Passing	Brady McBride	7/13, 155 yards, 2 TDs
Texas State	Rushing	Brock Sturges	6 carries, 31 yards
Texas State	Receiving	Marcell Barbee	5 receptions, 71 yards, 1 TD
Georgia Southern	Passing	Shai Werts	6/9, 51 yards, 1 INT
Georgia Southern	Rushing	Shai Werts	21 carries, 120 yards, 3 TDs
Georgia Southern	Receiving	Wesley Kennedy III	1 reception, 23 yards

=== At Army ===
Georgia Southern at Army

Team	1	2	3	4	Total
Eagles	14	7	6	0	27
• Black Knights	0	7	14	7	28

- Date: November 21, 2020
- Location: Michie Stadium
  West Point, NY
- Game start: 12:02 p.m. EST
- Elapsed time: 3 hours and 17 minutes
- Game attendance: 5,078
- Game weather: 57 °F (14 °C) • Weather: Clear • Wind: W 10 MPH
- Referee: Mike Roche
- TV announcers (CBSSN): Bem Holden (play–by–play), Ross Tucker (analyst), and Tina Cervasio (sideline reporter)

Scoring summary
1	06:55	GASO	Shai Werts 1-yard rush (Alex Raynor kick) (2 plays, 1 yard, 0:45)	GASO 7–0
1	06:45	GASO	Derrick Canteen 22-yard fumble returned (Alex Raynor kick) (1 play, -3 yards, 0:10)	GASO 14–0
2	06:55	ARMY	Sandon McCoy 1-yard rush (Quinn Maretzki kick) (15 plays, 75 yards, 8:00)	GASO 14–7
2	09:24	GASO	Cam Brown 24-yard pass from Shai Werts (Alex Raynor kick) (8 plays, 86 yards, 4:14)	GASO 21–7
3	08:22	ARMY	Braheam Murphy 12-yard rush (Quinn Maretzki kick) (11 plays, 52 yards, 6:31)	GASO 21–14
3	06:18	ARMY	Sandon McCoy 2-yard rush (Quinn Maretzki kick) (1 play, 17 yards, 0:04)	TIE 21–21
3	04:17	GASO	Logan Wright 39-yard pass from Shai Werts (Alex Raynor PAT blocked) (4 plays, 75 yards, 2:01)	GASO 27–21
4	08:16	ARMY	Jakobi Buchanan 2-yard rush (Quinn Maretzki kick) (18 plays, 71 yards, 10:50)	ARMY 28–27

Statistics	Georgia Southern	Army
First downs	12	20
Total yards	311	268
Rushing yards	175	243
Passing yards	126	25
Turnovers	1	3
Time of possession	21:36	38:24

Team	Category	Player	Statistics
Georgia Southern	Passing	Shai Werts	6/7, 80 yards, 2 TDs
Georgia Southern	Rushing	Wesley Kennedy III	8 carries, 71 yards
Georgia Southern	Receiving	Malik Murray	3 receptions, 41 yards
Army	Passing	Tyhier Tyler	1/1, 25 yards
Army	Rushing	Tyhier Taylor	35 carries, 121 yards
Army	Receiving	Chris Cameron	1 reception, 25 yards

=== At Georgia State ===
Georgia Southern at Georgia State

Team	1	2	3	4	Total
Eagles	0	14	3	7	24
• Panthers	3	10	0	17	30

- Date: November 28, 2020
- Location: Center Parc Stadium
  Atlanta, GA
- Game start: 12:05 p.m. EST
- Elapsed time: 2 hours and 55 minutes
- Game attendance: 4,523
- Game weather: 62 °F (17 °C) • Weather: Sunny • Wind: SSE 8 MPH
- Referee: Wayne Winkler
- TV announcers (ESPN3): Matt Stewart (play–by–play) and Sam Crenshaw (analyst)
\

Scoring summary
1	05:55	GSU	Noel Ruiz 35-yard field goal (5 plays, 36 yards, 2:26)	GSU 3–0
2	14:56	GASO	Shai Werts 7-yard rush (Alex Raynor kick) (13 plays, 75 yards, 5:59)	GASO 7–3
2	12:00	GASO	Logan Wright 63-yard rush (Alex Raynor kick) (3 plays, 69 yards, 1:30)	GASO 14–3
2	05:35	GSU	Noel Ruiz 29-yard field goal (8 plays, 76 yards, 2:40)	GASO 14–6
2	00:46	GSU	Cornelius McCoy 45-yard pass from Cornelious Brown IV (Noel Ruiz kick) (7 plays, 65 yards, 1:59)	GASO 14–13
3	12:08	GASO	Alex Raynor 29-yard field goal (5 plays, 56 yards, 2:52)	GASO 17–13
4	14:56	GASO	Logan Wright 5-yard rush (Alex Raynor kick) (3 plays, 37 yards, 1:01)	GASO 24–13
4	12:13	GSU	Destin Coates 4-yard rush (two-point conversion pass failed) (8 plays, 75 yards, 2:43)	GASO 24–19
4	02:54	GSU	Cornelious Brown IV 1-yard rush (Cornelious Brown IV two-point conversion pass to Sam Pinckney) (10 plays, 69 yards, 4:48)	GSU 27–24
4	01:53	GSU	Noel Ruiz 35-yard field goal (4 plays, 4 yards, 0:18)	GSU 30–24

Statistics	Georgia Southern	Georgia State
First downs	13	22
Total yards	370	427
Rushing yards	296	55
Passing yards	74	372
Turnovers	2	2
Time of possession	30:48	29:12

Team	Category	Player	Statistics
Georgia Southern	Passing	Shai Werts	4/7, 67 yards
Georgia Southern	Rushing	Logan Wright	8 carries, 143 yards, 2 TDs
Georgia Southern	Receiving	Khaleb Hood	1 reception, 44 yards
Georgia State	Passing	Cornelious Brown IV	28/39, 372 yards, 1 TD, 1 INT
Georgia State	Rushing	Destin Coates	15 carries, 47 yards, 1 TD
Georgia State	Receiving	Sam Pinckney	10 receptions, 126 yards

=== Florida Atlantic ===
Florida Atlantic at Georgia Southern

Team	1	2	3	4	Total
Owls	0	0	3	0	3
• Eagles	0	10	0	10	20

- Date: December 5, 2020
- Location: Paulson Stadium
  Statesboro, GA
- Game start: 6:05 p.m. EST
- Elapsed time: 3 hours and 55 minutes
- Game attendance: 3,867
- Referee: T. Livingston
- TV announcers (ESPN+): Matt Stewart (play–by–play) and Danny Waugh (analyst)

Scoring summary
2	13:29	GASO	Khaleb Hood 49-yard punt returned (Alex Raynor kick) (3 plays, 7 yards, 1:25)	GASO 7–0
2	03:30	GASO	Alex Raynor 30-yard field goal (10 plays, 34 yards, 4:18)	GASO 10–0
3	02:26	FAU	Vladimir Rivas 26-yard field goal (10 plays, 67 yards, 3:20)	GASO 10–3
4	12:39	GASO	Logan Wright 2-yard rush (Alex Raynor kick) (9 plays, 78 yards, 4:39)	GASO 17–3
4	04:51	GASO	Alex Raynor37-yard field goal (10 plays, 23 yards, 5:36)	GASO 20–3

Statistics	Florida Atlantic	Georgia Southern
First downs	16	18
Total yards	322	339
Rushing yards	133	269
Passing yards	189	70
Turnovers	4	0
Time of possession	23:15	36:45

Team	Category	Player	Statistics
Florida Atlantic	Passing	Javion Posey	7/15, 107 yards, 2 TDs
Florida Atlantic	Rushing	Javion Posey	8 carries, 61 yards
Florida Atlantic	Receiving	Jordan Merrell	3 receptions, 67 yards
Georgia Southern	Passing	Justin Tomlin	3/12, 70 yards
Georgia Southern	Rushing	Justin Tomlin	20 carries, 78 yards
Georgia Southern	Receiving	Logan Wright	2 receptions, 65 yards

=== Appalachian State ===
Appalachian State at Georgia Southern

Team	1	2	3	4	Total
• Mountaineers	0	7	10	17	34
Eagles	7	10	0	9	26

- Date: December 12, 2020
- Location: Paulson Stadium
  Statesboro, GA
- Game start: 6:05 p.m. EST
- Elapsed time: 3 hours and 17 minutes
- Game attendance: 6,228
- Referee: Kyle Olson
- TV announcers (ESPN3): Matt Stewart (play–by–play) and Danny Waugh (analyst)

Scoring summary
1	01:59	GASO	David Spaulding 28-yard interception returned (Alex Raynor kick) (2 plays, 3 yards, 0:40)	GASO 7–0
2	09:22	GASO	Justin Tomlin 14-yard rush (Alex Raynor kick) (11 plays, 72 yards, 5:38)	GASO 14–0
2	01:55	APP	Jalen Virgil 16-yard pass from Zac Thomas (Chandler Staton kick) (17 plays, 65 yards, 7:27)	GASO 14–7
2	00:00	GASO	Alex Raynor 33-yard field goal (7 plays, 50 yards, 1:10)	GASO 17–7
3	10:44	APP	Thomas Hennigan 9-yard pass from Zac Thomas (Chandler Staton kick) (10 plays, 72 yards, 4:10)	GASO 17–14
3	04:20	APP	Chandler Staton 33-yard field goal (8 plays, 41 yards, 4:07)	TIE 17–17
4	14:51	GASO	Alex Raynor 47-yard field goal (10 plays, 46 yards, 4:29)	GASO 20–17
4	14:36	APP	Jalen Virgil 100-yard kickoff returned (Chandler Staton kick); 0 plays, 0 yards, 0:00)	APP 24–20
4	12:51	APP	Nate Noel 70-yard rush (Chandler Staton kick) (1 play, 70 yards, 0:12)	APP 31–20
4	05:23	GASO	Dexter Carter Jr. 78-yard pass from Miller Mosley (two-point pass conversion attempt failed) (2 plays, 85 yards, 0:34)	APP 31–26
4	02:44	APP	Chandler Staton 37-yard field goal (7 plays, 55 yards, 2:39)	APP 34–26

Statistics	Appalachian State	Georgia Southern
First downs	17	16
Total yards	381	349
Rushing yards	173	204
Passing yards	208	145
Turnovers	2	4
Time of possession	34:52	25:08

Team	Category	Player	Statistics
Appalachian State	Passing	Zac Thomas	18/29, 208 yards, 2 TDs, 1 INT
Appalachian State	Rushing	Nate Noel	13 carries, 103 yards, 1 TD
Appalachian State	Receiving	Thomas Hennigan	8 receptions, 64 yards, 1 TD
Georgia Southern	Passing	Miller Mosley	5/14, 122 yards, 1 TD, 2 INTs
Georgia Southern	Rushing	Justin Tomlin	6 carries, 76 yards, 1 TD
Georgia Southern	Receiving	Dexter Carter Jr.	1 reception, 78 yards, 1 TD

=== Louisiana Tech (New Orleans Bowl) ===
Georgia Southern vs. Louisiana Tech

Team	1	2	3	4	Total
• Eagles	7	14	7	10	38
Bulldogs	0	3	0	0	3

- Date: December 23, 2020
- Location: Mercedes–Benz Superdome
  New Orleans, LA
- Game start: 3:04 p.m. EST
- Elapsed time: 3 hours and 8 minutes
- Game attendance: 3,000
- Game weather: Weather: N/A (Indoors)• Wind: None
- Referee: C. Lamertina
- TV announcers (ESPN): Matt Barrie (play–by–play), Mike Golic Jr. (analyst), and Dawn Davenport (sideline reporter)

Scoring summary
1	09:52	GASO	Shai Werts 1-yard rush (Alex Raynor kick) (10 plays, 65 yards, 5:08)	GASO 7–0
2	14:51	GASO	Khaleb Hood 65-yard pass from Shai Werts (Alex Raynor kick) (5 plays, 72 yards, 1:41)	GASO 14–0
2	06:26	GASO	Shai Werts 37-yard rush (Alex Raynor kick) (3 plays, 0 yards, 1:20)	GASO 21–0
2	00:09	LT	Jacob Barnes 45-yard field goal (4 plays, -7 yards, 0:22)	GASO 21–3
3	05:54	GASO	Shai Werts 1-yard rush (Alex Raynor kick) (4 plays, 47 yards, 1:29)	GASO 28–3
4	13:28	GASO	Alex Raynor 25-yard field goal (10 plays, 38 yards, 4:58)	GASO 31–3
4	03:07	GASO	Gerald Green 4-yard rush (Alex Raynor kick) (7 plays, 80 yards, 4:40)	GASO 38–3

Statistics	Louisiana Tech	Georgia Southern
First downs	15	17
Total yards	232	448
Rushing yards	113	322
Passing yards	119	126
Turnovers	4	0
Time of possession	25:33	34:27

Team	Category	Player	Statistics
Louisiana Tech	Passing	JD Head	9/14, 78 yards, 1 INT
Louisiana Tech	Rushing	Israel Tucker	20 carries, 123 yards
Louisiana Tech	Receiving	Isaiah Graham	3 receptions, 26 yards
Georgia Southern	Passing	Shai Werts	7/12, 126 yards, 1 TD
Georgia Southern	Rushing	Gerald Green	16 carries, 108 yards, 1 TD
Georgia Southern	Receiving	Khaleb Hood	1 reception, 65 yards, 1 TD
