= Chad Lunsford =

American football coach (born 1977)

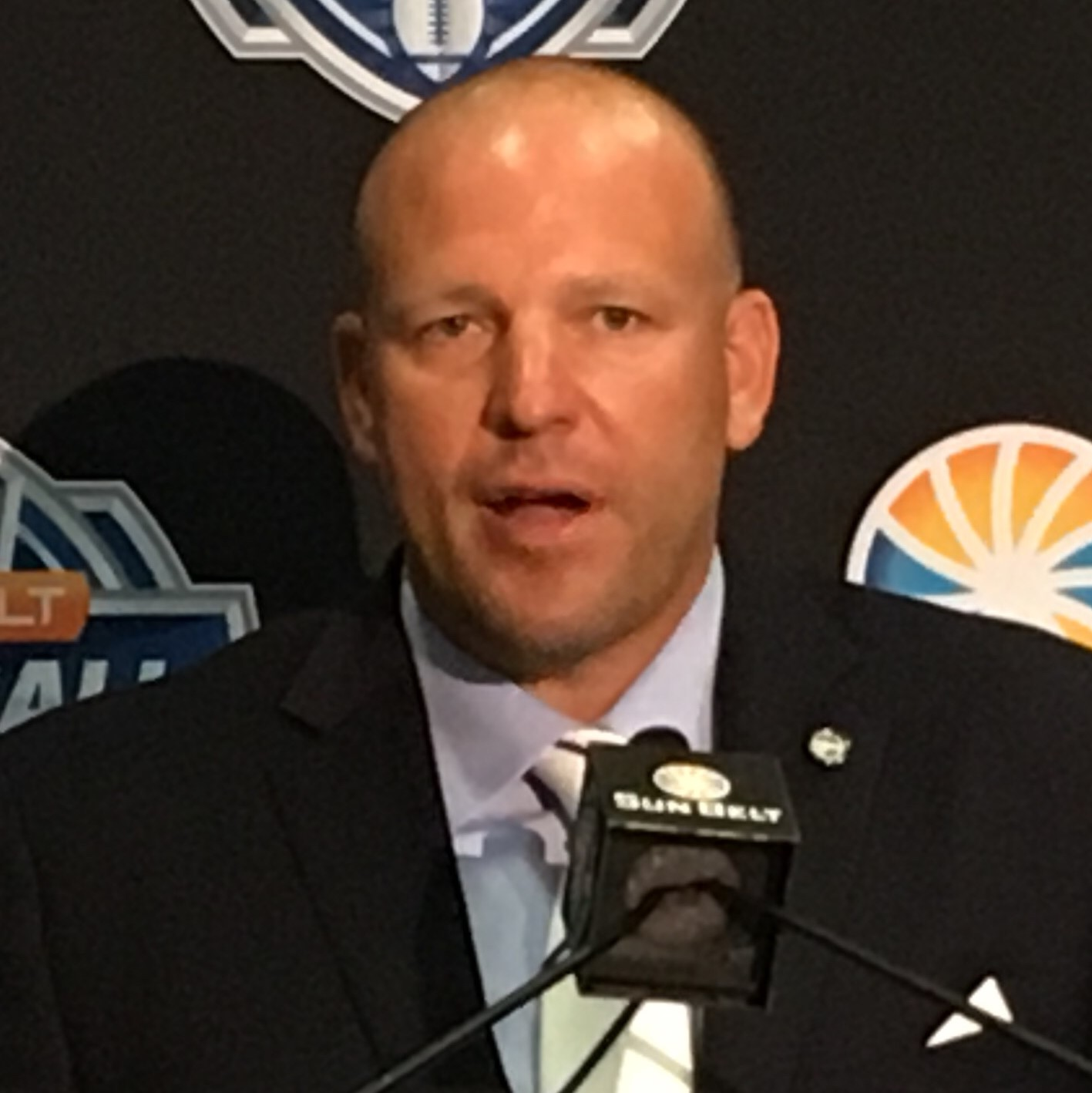
- Lunsford at 2018 Sun Belt Media Day

Current position
- Title: Special teams coordinator
- Team: Arkansas
- Conference: SEC

Biographical details
- Born: February 24, 1977 (age 49); Elberton, Georgia, U.S.
- Education: Georgia College (2000)

Coaching career (HC unless noted)
- 1996: Georgia Military (SA)
- 1997–1999: Georgia Military (RB)
- 2000: Georgia Military (RB/LB)
- 2001–2002: Appalachian State (TE)
- 2003–2005: Georgia Southern (SB)
- 2006: Griffin HS (GA) (LB)
- 2007–2008: Georgia Military (ST/LB)
- 2013: Georgia Southern (WR)
- 2014–2015: Georgia Southern (TE)
- 2016–2017: Georgia Southern (ST/RC)
- 2017: Georgia Southern (interim HC)
- 2018–2021: Georgia Southern
- 2022: Florida Atlantic (ST/TE)
- 2023–2024: Florida Atlantic (AHC/ST/TE)
- 2024: Florida Atlantic (interim HC/ST/TE)
- 2025: Auburn (ST)
- 2026–present: Arkansas (STC)

Administrative career (AD unless noted)
- 2009–2012: Auburn (dir. of scouting)

Head coaching record
- Overall: 29–22
- Bowls: 2–1

Chad Kevin Lunsford (born February 24, 1977) is an American football coach who currently serves as the special teams coordinator at Arkansas. He previously served as the head football coach at Georgia Southern team and as the interim head coach and tight ends coach at Florida Atlantic. He was awarded the job on November 27, 2017, after serving as interim for the second half of the season following the firing and departure of Tyson Summers. Following a 1–3 start, Lunsford was fired by Georgia Southern early in the 2021 season.

== Early life and education ==
Lunsford attended and played football at Elbert County High School in Elberton, Georgia. He graduated from Georgia College and State University in Milledgeville in May 2000 with a degree in biology and a minor in mathematics. While attending Georgia College as an undergraduate, he served as a student assistant at cross-town Georgia Military College. He holds a Master's of Sport Science from the United States Sports Academy.

== Head coaching record ==
Year	Team	Overall	Conference	Standing	Bowl/playoffs
Georgia Southern Eagles (Sun Belt Conference) (2017–2021)
2017	Georgia Southern	2–4 (Note: Served as interim head coach after Tyson Summers was fired after 6 games.)	2–4	T–10th	
2018	Georgia Southern	10–3	6–2	3rd (East)	W Camellia
2019	Georgia Southern	7–6	5–3	2nd (East)	L Cure
2020	Georgia Southern	8–5	4–4	3rd (East)	W New Orleans
2021	Georgia Southern	1–3 (Note: Georgia Southern fired Lunsford after 4 games.)	0–1	(East)	
Georgia Southern:		28–21	17–14		
Florida Atlantic Owls (American Athletic Conference) (2024)
2024	Florida Atlantic	1–1 (Note: Lunsford was named interim head coach after Tom Herman's firing after 10 games.)	1–1	T–13th	
Florida Atlantic:		1–1	1–1		
Total:		29–22			

== Personal life ==
Lunsford is married to Tiffany "Tippy" Lunsford. They have three children. Lunsford is a Christian.
