= Georgia Southern University Southern Pride Marching Band =

College marching band in Statesboro, Georgia

Southern Pride Marching Band
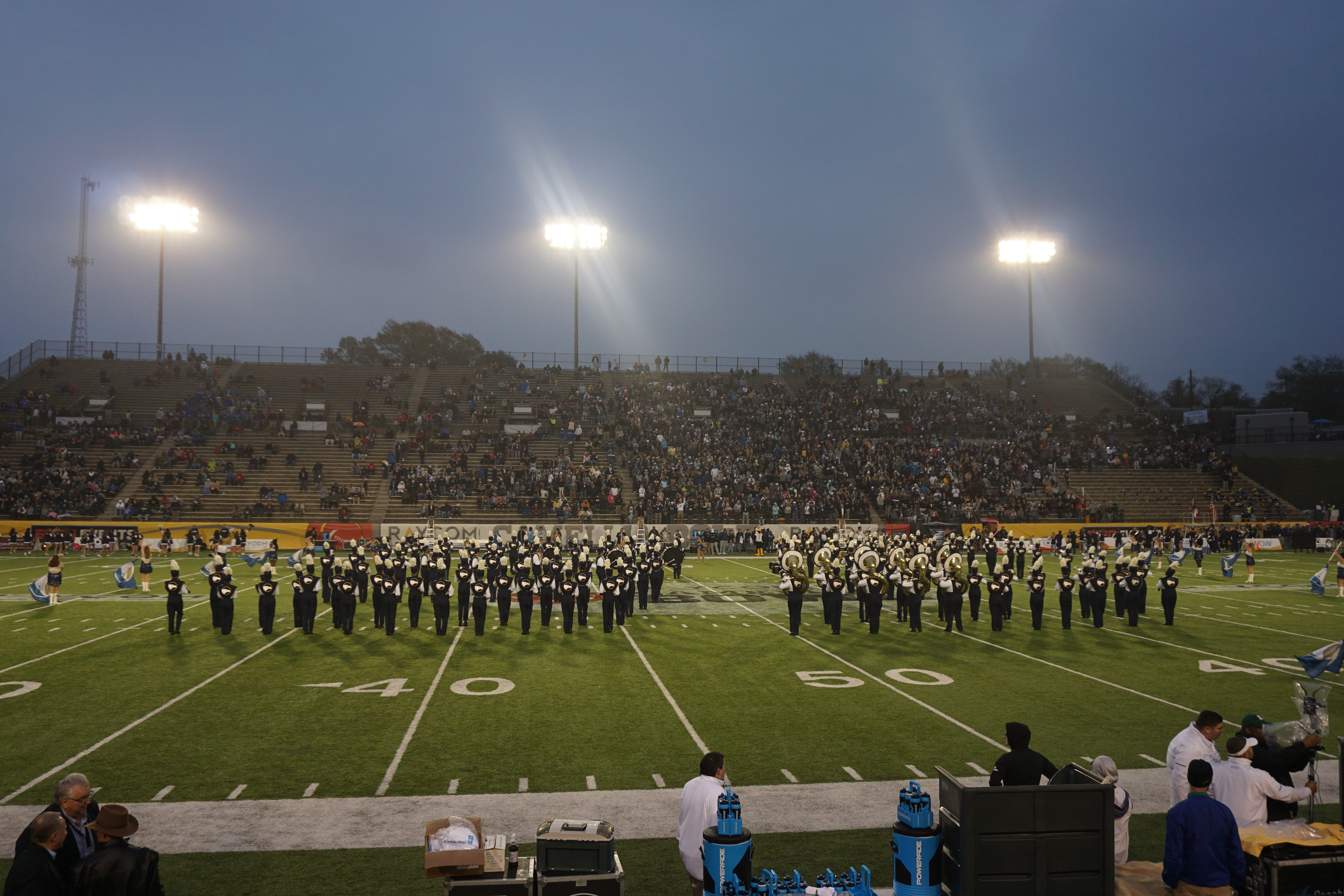
- The Georgia Southern University Southern Pride Marching Band performing at the 2018 Camellia Bowl
- School: Georgia Southern University
- Location: Statesboro, Georgia, USA
- Conference: Sun Belt Conference
- Founded: 1982
- Director: Michael Thomas
- Members: 220

Southern Pride is the name for the marching band of Georgia Southern University located in Statesboro, Georgia.

At over 200 members strong and featuring students from every College and department on campus, the university's marching band celebrated its 25th anniversary in 2007. Southern Pride performs at all home football games, select away athletic events, parades, and as an exhibition band at marching contests throughout the state and region. Southern Pride has also performed at halftime for the Atlanta Falcons, pregame for the Atlanta Braves, and has had members of its drumline perform on the David Letterman Show.

== History ==
With the re-establishment of Georgia Southern football, the Eagles needed the support of a marching band. Dr. Jerrold Michaelson, a professor of music education and percussion, rose the occasion and established the Georgia Southern marching band. The band performed at home football games played at Womack Field on the campus of Statesboro High School (1982–1983) and later Paulson Stadium (1984–2019).

At the end of the 1989 football season, both head football coach Erk Russell and Dr. Michaelson stepped down from their leadership roles. Georgia Southern would turn to Dr. Daniel Pittman, who was instrumental in the development of the band program. He established a second concert ensemble, the Wind Symphony, and helped name the marching band. In addition to the "Southern Pride" name, the band also earned the moniker "The Hardest Working Band in Show Business," a reference to the hot temperatures experienced by band members in band camp and afternoon rehearsals. In 1991, Georgia Southern alumnus Matthew Fallin was hired to run the Percussion studio and assist with Southern Pride. Dr. Fallin marched in the first Georgia Southern marching band and returned to Statesboro after pursuing graduate degrees at Louisiana Tech University and the University of Miami (FL). The two directors would go on to double the size of the marching band, with Dr. Fallin taking over in 1994.

After 16 years at the helm, Dr. Fallin stepped down as Director of Athletic bands, leading to the hire of Dr. Colin McKenzie. A graduate of Valdosta State, Baylor, and Michigan State, McKenzie would help usher in change in philosophy, adjusting the pregame routine, increasing the number of different halftime themes, and introducing the "Script Eagles" formation. Dr. McKenzie also lead Southern Pride through its first bowl game appearance, in the rainy 2015 GoDaddy.com Bowl in Mobile, AL.

Upon Dr. McKenzie's departure, the band turned to Dr. Derek Shapiro as interim director of athletic bands in 2016. During the 2016–2017 school year, the school began a national search and hired Dr. Daniel Haddad as the 6th director of the Southern Pride marching band.

After Dr. Haddad announced his departure, the university turned to another graduate in Michael Thomas as interim director beginning in 2021.

== Pre-Game Routine ==
Most home games are preceded by a pre-game rehearsal during which the band perfects their pre-game and halftime shows. Approximately 2 hours before kick-off, the drumline helps welcome the Eagle football team to Paulson during the Eagle Walk with a mixture of exercises and cadences. The marching band then forms their parade block at the RAC (Recreational Activities Center) and begins the 0.6 mile trek to Paulson stadium. The current pre-game show includes the Georgia Southern Eagles Fight Song, followed by several stand tunes (Go Georgia Southern, Go Big Blue, Eat 'em Up). What follows is the GSU Scramble. During the Scramble, the drumline performs a cadence while band members scatter en route to forming a large G-S-U across the field. A fan favorite, the GSU Scramble has survived across multiple directors. After the scramble, the marching band performs an arrangement of Georgia on my Mind while forming an outline of the state of Georgia, with the trumpet soloist taking the approximate position of Statesboro. Following the playing of the US National Anthem, Southern Pride moves into position to welcome the football team to the field, but not before taking part in the "most exciting 30 seconds in college football," Freedom's Flight! Freedom, a full-flight bald eagle housed in the Lamar Q. Ball Raptor Center at Georgia Southern soars over the band as they perform a rendition of Gonna Fly Now, by Bill Conti. Finally, the Georgia Southern Eagles Fight Song is played again as the Eagles enter into the "Prettiest Little Stadium in America."

== Fight Song ==
The Georgia Southern Eagles Fight Song was composed by Richard W. Bowles, longtime director of bands at the University of Florida and introduced to Southern Pride by Dr. Jerrold Michaelson, during the band's inaugural season. . It is in the key of B-flat major and in 2-4 time. It consists of 53 measures, including a break strain and coda. When the football team scores 20 points, the drumline switches to the "machine gun," a steady streaming of sixteenth notes that mimics an automatic weapon. At 30 points, the drumline switches to "shotgun," which consists of everyone playing half notes. Finally, when scoring 40, the drumline switches to "artillery cannon," which is simply playing a whole note every measure.

== Alma Mater ==
With music by former Music Department Chair Dr. David Matthew and lyrics by Carol Cain Brown, the Georgia Southern Alma Mater has been played by Southern Pride and sung by the football team at the conclusion of every home (and select away) football game since the hire of head football coach Jeff Monken in 2010.

== "It is Well" ==
Following the Alma Mater, Southern Pride will perform its rendition of the hymn "It is Well." The band uses it as a chorale/warm-up and as a reminder that, no matter the outcome of the game, it's better to lose as an Eagle than win as anything else!

== Directors of Southern Pride ==
- Dr. Jerrold Michaelson (1982–1989)
- Dr. Daniel Pittman (1990–1993)
- Dr. Matthew Fallin (1994–2010)
- Dr. Colin McKenzie (2011–2015)
- Dr. Derek Shapiro (interim) (2016)
- Dr. Daniel Haddad (2017–2020)
- Mr. Michael Thomas (2021–present)
