= 2020 New Orleans Bowl =

Postseason college football bowl game

2020 R+L Carriers New Orleans Bowl
- 20th New Orleans Bowl
Louisiana Tech Bulldogs	Georgia Southern Eagles
(5–4)	(7–5)
C-USA	Sun Belt
3	38
Head coach: Skip Holtz	Head coach: Chad Lunsford
	1	2	3	4	Total
Louisiana Tech	0	3	0	0	3
Georgia Southern	7	14	7	10	38
- Date: December 23, 2020
- Season: 2020
- Stadium: Mercedes-Benz Superdome
- Location: New Orleans, Louisiana
- MVP: Shai Werts (QB, Georgia Southern)
- Favorite: Georgia Southern by 7
- Referee: Charles Lamertina (The American)
- Attendance: 3,000

United States TV coverage
- Network: ESPN and ESPN Radio
- Announcers: ESPN: Matt Barrie (play-by-play), Mike Golic Jr. (analyst), Dawn Davenport (sideline); ESPN Radio: Sean Kelley (play-by-play) and Barrett Jones (analyst)

International TV coverage
- Network: ESPN Deportes

The 2020 New Orleans Bowl was a college football bowl game played on December 23, 2020, with kickoff at for 3:00 p.m. EST (2:00 p.m. local CST) on ESPN. It was the 20th edition of the New Orleans Bowl, and was one of the 2020–21 bowl games concluding the 2020 FBS football season. Sponsored by freight shipping company R+L Carriers, the game was officially known as the R+L Carriers New Orleans Bowl.

== Teams ==
The 2020 New Orleans Bowl was contested by the Georgia Southern Eagles, from the Sun Belt Conference, and the Louisiana Tech Bulldogs, from Conference USA. The game was the first matchup between the two teams.

=== Georgia Southern ===
Georgia Southern of the Sun Belt accepted their bid on December 14, 2020. The Eagles entered the bowl with an overall record of 7–5 (4–3 in conference play). This was Georgia Southern's first appearance in the New Orleans Bowl.

=== Louisiana Tech ===
Louisiana Tech of Conference USA accepted their bid on December 14, 2020. The Bulldogs entered the bowl with an overall record of 5–4 (4–2 in conference play). This was Louisiana Tech's second New Orleans bowl appearance, their first coming in 2015, when they defeated Arkansas State, 47–28.

== Game summary ==
2020 R+L Carriers New Orleans Bowl

Quarter	1	2	3	4	Total
Louisiana Tech	0	3	0	0	3
Georgia Southern	7	14	7	10	38

at Mercedes-Benz Superdome • New Orleans, Louisiana

- Date: Wednesday, December 23, 2020
- Game time: 3:00 p.m. EST (2:00 p.m. CST)
- Game weather: n/a (game played indoors)
- Referee: Charles Lamertina (The American)
- TV announcers (ESPN): Matt Barrie (play-by-play), Mike Golic Jr. (analyst), Dawn Davenport (sideline)
- ESPN game summary

Game information

First quarter

- (9:52) GASO – Shai Werts 1 yard rush, Alex Raynor kick (Drive: 10 plays, 65 yards, 5:08; Georgia Southern 7–0)

Second quarter

- (14:51) GASO – Khaleb Hood 65 yard pass from Shai Werts, Alex Raynor kick (Drive: 5 plays, 90 yards, 1:41; Georgia Southern 14–0)
- (6:26) GASO – Shai Werts 37 yard rush, Alex Raynor kick (Drive: 3 plays, 57 yards, 1:20; Georgia Southern 21–0)
- (0:09) LT – Jacob Barnes 45 yard field goal (Drive: 4 plays, –7 yards, 0:22; Georgia Southern 21–3)

Third quarter

- (5:54) GASO – Shai Werts 1 yard rush, Alex Raynor kick (Drive: 4 plays, 47 yards, 1:29; Georgia Southern 28–3)

Fourth quarter

- (13:28) GASO – Alex Raynor 25 yard field goal (Drive: 10 plays, 38 yards, 4:58; Georgia Southern 31–3)
- (3:07) GASO – Gerald Green 4 yard rush, Alex Raynor kick (Drive: 7 plays, 80 yards, 4:40; Georgia Southern 38–3)

=== Statistics ===
Statistics	LT	GASO
First downs	15	17
Plays–yards	66–232	69–448
Rushes–yards	27–113	57–322
Passing yards	119	126
Passing: comp–att–int	19–39–4	7–12–0
Time of possession	25:33	34:27

Team	Category	Player	Statistics
Louisiana Tech	Passing	JD Head	9/14, 78 yards, 1 INT
Louisiana Tech	Rushing	Israel Tucker	20 carries, 123 yards
Louisiana Tech	Receiving	Isaiah Graham	3 receptions, 26 yards
Georgia Southern	Passing	Shai Werts	7/12, 126 yards, 1 TD
Georgia Southern	Rushing	Gerald Green	16 carries, 108 yards, 1 TD
Georgia Southern	Receiving	Khaleb Hood	1 reception, 65 yards, 1 TD

=== Records ===
The 3 points scored by Louisiana Tech tied with the bowl record for the fewest points allowed. The game also broke other records, such as the largest margin of victory, most rushing yards (by Georgia Southern), fewest yards allowed (by Louisiana Tech). Other individual records include: tying most rushing touchdowns (Shai Werts of Georgia Southern's 3 TDs), tying most interceptions (Justin Birdsong of Georgia Southern's 2 interceptions), and longest touchdown pass (Shai Werts to Khaleb Hood for 65 yards).

== See also ==
- 2021 Sugar Bowl, played at the same venue 9 days later
