= 2020 Louisiana Tech Bulldogs football team =

American college football season

2020 Louisiana Tech Bulldogs football

New Orleans Bowl, L 3–38 vs. Georgia Southern
- Conference: Conference USA
- West Division
- Record: 5–5 (4–2 C-USA)
- Head coach: Skip Holtz (8th season)
- Offensive coordinator: Joe Sloan (1st season)
- Offensive scheme: Multiple
- Defensive coordinator: David Blackwell (1st season)
- Base defense: 3–4
- Home stadium: Joe Aillet Stadium

2020 Conference USA football standings
	Conf.			Overall
Team	W		L	W		L
East Division
Marshall xy	4	–	1	7	–	3
Florida Atlantic	4	–	2	5	–	4
Western Kentucky	4	–	3	5	–	7
Charlotte	2	–	2	2	–	4
Middle Tennessee	2	–	4	3	–	6
FIU	0	–	3	0	–	5
West Division
UAB xy$	3	–	1	6	–	3
UTSA	5	–	2	7	–	5
Louisiana Tech	4	–	2	5	–	5
North Texas	3	–	4	4	–	6
Rice	2	–	3	2	–	3
Southern Miss	2	–	4	3	–	7
UTEP	0	–	4	3	–	5
Championship: UAB 22, Marshall 13
$ – Conference champion; x – Division champion/co-champions; y – Championship game participant; Note: Due to COVID-19, Old Dominion opted out of the season.

The 2020 Louisiana Tech Bulldogs football team represented Louisiana Tech University in the 2020 NCAA Division I FBS football season. The Bulldogs played their home games at Joe Aillet Stadium in Ruston, Louisiana, and competed in the West Division of Conference USA (C-USA). They were led by eighth-year head coach Skip Holtz.

== Preseason ==
=== Recruiting class ===
College recruiting
Name	Hometown	School	Height	Weight	40^{‡}	Commit date
Luke Anthony; Quarterback	Dallas, TX	All Saints' Episcopal; Abilene Christian	6 ft 1 in (1.85 m)	205 lb (93 kg)	–	Feb 5, 2020
Luke Anthony; Quarterback	Recruit ratings: Scout: Rivals: 247Sports: ESPN:					
Ben Bell; Defensive Line	Cedar Park, TX	Cedar Park HS	6 ft 2 in (1.88 m)	242 lb (110 kg)	–	Dec 18, 2019
Ben Bell; Defensive Line	Recruit ratings: Scout: Rivals: 247Sports: ESPN:					
Dontrell Cobbs; Defensive Line	West Monroe, LA	West Monroe HS	6 ft 4 in (1.93 m)	309 lb (140 kg)	–	Dec 18, 2019
Dontrell Cobbs; Defensive Line	Recruit ratings: Scout: Rivals: 247Sports: ESPN:					
Joren Dickey; Linebacker	Albuquerque, NM	Volcano Vista HS; Trinity Valley CC	6 ft 3 in (1.91 m)	217 lb (98 kg)	–	Dec 18, 2019
Joren Dickey; Linebacker	Recruit ratings: Scout: Rivals: 247Sports: ESPN:					
Harlan Dixon; Running Back	Slidell, LA	Slidell HS	6 ft 0 in (1.83 m)	190 lb (86 kg)	–	Dec 18, 2019
Harlan Dixon; Running Back	Recruit ratings: Scout: Rivals: 247Sports: ESPN:					
Kershawn Fisher; Linebacker	Slidell, LA	Northshore HS	6 ft 2 in (1.88 m)	222 lb (101 kg)	–	Dec 18, 2019
Kershawn Fisher; Linebacker	Recruit ratings: Scout: Rivals: 247Sports: ESPN:					
Michael Gause; Offensive Line	Byhalia, MS	Byhalia HS; Hinds CC	6 ft 4 in (1.93 m)	285 lb (129 kg)	–	Dec 18, 2019
Michael Gause; Offensive Line	Recruit ratings: Scout: Rivals: 247Sports: ESPN:					
Jerren Gilbert; Offensive Line	Lake Charles, LA	Sam Houston HS	6 ft 3 in (1.91 m)	276 lb (125 kg)	–	Feb 5, 2020
Jerren Gilbert; Offensive Line	Recruit ratings: Scout: Rivals: 247Sports: ESPN:					
Tyler Grubbs; Linebacker	New Orleans, LA	Holy Cross HS	6 ft 1 in (1.85 m)	215 lb (98 kg)	–	Dec 18, 2019
Tyler Grubbs; Linebacker	Recruit ratings: Scout: Rivals: 247Sports: ESPN:					
Xavier Guy; Offensive Line	West Monroe, LA	Carroll HS; Tyler JC	6 ft 4 in (1.93 m)	280 lb (130 kg)	–	Dec 18, 2019
Xavier Guy; Offensive Line	Recruit ratings: Scout: Rivals: 247Sports: ESPN:					
Bert Hale; Offensive Line	Epps, LA	Oak Grove HS	6 ft 2 in (1.88 m)	329 lb (149 kg)	–	Dec 18, 2019
Bert Hale; Offensive Line	Recruit ratings: Scout: Rivals: 247Sports: ESPN:					
Cleveland "Tre" Harris; Wide Receiver	Lafayette, LA	Ovey Comeaux HS	6 ft 2 in (1.88 m)	193 lb (88 kg)	–	Dec 18, 2019
Cleveland "Tre" Harris; Wide Receiver	Recruit ratings: Scout: Rivals: 247Sports: ESPN:					
Jack McKenzie; Offensive Line	McComb, MS	Parklane Academy	6 ft 3 in (1.91 m)	330 lb (150 kg)	–	Dec 18, 2019
Jack McKenzie; Offensive Line	Recruit ratings: Scout: Rivals: 247Sports: ESPN:					
J. D. Head; Quarterback	Pearland, TX	Pearland HS	6 ft 1 in (1.85 m)	200 lb (91 kg)	–	Dec 18, 2019
J. D. Head; Quarterback	Recruit ratings: Scout: Rivals: 247Sports: ESPN:					
Jemaurian Jones; Defensive Back	Bogue Chitto, MS	Brookhaven HS; Copiah–Lincoln CC	6 ft 2 in (1.88 m)	181 lb (82 kg)	–	Dec 18, 2019
Jemaurian Jones; Defensive Back	Recruit ratings: Scout: Rivals: 247Sports: ESPN:					
Jamison Kelly; Defensive Back	Columbia, MS	Columbia HS	6 ft 1 in (1.85 m)	192 lb (87 kg)	–	Dec 18, 2019
Jamison Kelly; Defensive Back	Recruit ratings: Scout: Rivals: 247Sports: ESPN:					
Ralpheal "Taz" Marshall; Defensive Back	Pearland, TX	Pearland HS	6 ft 1 in (1.85 m)	190 lb (86 kg)	–	Feb 5, 2020
Ralpheal "Taz" Marshall; Defensive Back	Recruit ratings: Scout: Rivals: 247Sports: ESPN:					
Joseph Mason; Linebacker	Shreveport, LA	Green Oaks HS	6 ft 2 in (1.88 m)	221 lb (100 kg)	–	Dec 18, 2019
Joseph Mason; Linebacker	Recruit ratings: Scout: Rivals: 247Sports: ESPN:					
Damon McFarland; Defensive Back	New Orleans, LA	St. Augustine HS	6 ft 0 in (1.83 m)	179 lb (81 kg)	–	Dec 18, 2019
Damon McFarland; Defensive Back	Recruit ratings: Scout: Rivals: 247Sports: ESPN:					
CJ McWilliams; Wide Receiver	Haughton, LA	Haughton HS	5 ft 9 in (1.75 m)	172 lb (78 kg)	–	Dec 18, 2019
CJ McWilliams; Wide Receiver	Recruit ratings: Scout: Rivals: 247Sports: ESPN:					
Keveion'ta Spears; Defensive Line	Baton Rouge, LA	McKinley HS	6 ft 2 in (1.88 m)	221 lb (100 kg)	–	Dec 18, 2019
Keveion'ta Spears; Defensive Line	Recruit ratings: Scout: Rivals: 247Sports: ESPN:					
Dallas Taylor–Cortez; Defensive Back	West Hills, CA	Chaminade HS; Iowa Western CC	6 ft 2 in (1.88 m)	180 lb (82 kg)	–	Feb 5, 2020
Dallas Taylor–Cortez; Defensive Back	Recruit ratings: Scout: Rivals: 247Sports: ESPN:					
Dakota White; Offensive Line	Katy, TX	Katy HS	6 ft 4 in (1.93 m)	290 lb (130 kg)	–	Dec 18, 2019
Dakota White; Offensive Line	Recruit ratings: Scout: Rivals: 247Sports: ESPN:					
Cedric Woods; Cornerback	Monroe, LA	Carroll HS	5 ft 10 in (1.78 m)	162 lb (73 kg)	–	Dec 18, 2019
Cedric Woods; Cornerback	Recruit ratings: Scout: Rivals: 247Sports: ESPN:					

== Roster ==
2020 Louisiana Tech Bulldogs football team roster
Players
Coaches
Offense

Pos.	#	Name	Class
QB	3	Aaron Allen	So
QB	5	Logan McFadden	Fr
WR	6	Adrian Hardy	Sr
QB	10	Westin Elliott	Sr
WR	11	George Scott	Jr
WR	13	Isaiah Graham	Sr
WR	14	Praise Okorie	Sr
TE	16	Zach Cousar	Sr
QB	18	Jakson Thomson	Fr
WR	19	Smoke Harris	So
RB	22	Israel Tucker	Sr
WR	24	Joshua Matthews	Jr
WR	26	Jawaun Johnson	Fr
RB	27	Elijah Hines	Fr
RB	29	DeAndre Marcus	So
RB	32	Ishmael Landers	Fr
RB	33	Justin Henderson	Sr
FB	45	Jacob Adams	Jr
OL	47	Drake Carroll	So
OL	51	Antawn Lewis	Jr
OL	60	Brett Pope	Fr
OL	62	Abraham Delfin	Jr
OL	63	Stevie Ballard	Fr
OL	64	Joshua Mote	Jr
OL	65	Kody Russey	Sr
OL	67	Walker Hankinson	Fr
OL	68	Justin Throckmorton	Jr
OL	72	Christian Henderson	So
OL	73	Willie Allen	Sr
OL	74	Jonah Brewster	Fr
OL	76	Biron Rossell	So
OL	78	Taylor Fondal	Sr
WR	80	Griffin Hebert	Jr
WR	81	Cee Jay Powell	Sr
WR	82	Doyle Adams Jr.	Fr
WR	83	Jake Norris	Sr
WR	85	Joseph Walker	Fr
WR	86	Wayne Toussant	So
WR	87	Carson Rieder	Fr
WR	88	Kyle Maxwell	Fr
WR	89	Tahj Magee	So
OL	95	Noah Pitre	So
QB		Luke Anthony	GS
RB		Harlan Dixon	Fr
OL		Michael Gause	Jr
OL		Jerrren Gilbert	Fr
OL		Xavier Guy	Jr
OL		Bert Hale	Fr
WR		Tre Harris	Fr
QB		J. D. Head	Fr
WR		C. J. McWilliams	Fr
OL		Dakota White	Fr

Defense

Pos.	#	Name	Class
LB	3	Trey Baldwin	Sr
S	7	Jaiden Cole	Jr
LB	8	Brandon Floyd	Sr
CB	16	CJ Johnson	Fr
CB	17	Brodrick Calhoun	So
CB	18	Zach Hannibal	Sr
S	20	Kollin Hurt	Jr
CB	23	Marquallius Turner	So
S	25	Bee Jay Williamson	So
S	31	Christian Archangel	Fr
LB	34	Reggie Cleveland	Sr
S	36	Khiry Morrison	Fr
CB	38	Charvis Thornton	Fr
LB	42	Maki Carabin	Fr
DE	43	Tristan Allen	Jr
DT	44	Keivie Rose	Fr
LB	46	Ezekiel Barnett	Sr
DE	47	Eric Kendzior	Sr
LB	48	Alex Zayed	Sr
LB	49	Isaiah Windmon	So
DT	50	Chris Spence	Sr
DT	52	D. J. Jackson	So
LB	54	Allen Walker	Fr
DE	56	Mykol Clark	Fr
LB	85	Willie Baker	Sr
DE	91	Steven Shaw	So
LB/DE	93	Deshon Hall	So
DL	95	Calvin Rhines	Fr
DE	97	Milton Williams	Jr
DL	99	Malik Wells	Jr
DL		Ben Bell	Fr
DL		Dontrell Cobbs	Fr
LB		Joren Dickey	Jr
LB		Kershawn Fisher	Fr
LB		Tyler Grubbs	Fr
CB		Jemaurian Jones	So
S		Jamison Kelly	Fr
DB		Taz Marshall	Fr
LB		Joseph Mason	Fr
DB		Damon McFarland	Fr
DL		Keveion'ta Spears	Fr
DB		Dallas Taylor-Cortez	So
CB		Cedric Woods	Fr

Special teams

Pos.	#	Name	Class
P/K	29	Brady Farlow	Sr
LS	58	Reeves Blankenship	Jr
LS	66	Noah White	Fr
K/P	98	Jacob Barnes	Fr

Head coach

- Skip Holtz (Notre Dame)

Coordinators/assistant coaches

- Joe Sloan (East Carolina)
  Offensive coordinator/qb
- David Blackwell (East Carolina)
  Defensive coordinator
- Dennis Smith (Miami (FL))
  Special teams coordinator/olb
- Jeff Burris (Notre Dame)
  Defensive backs
- Brian Gamble (Texas A&M)
  Linebackers
- Robert McFarland (McNeese State)
  Offensive line
- Anthony Camp (McNeese State)
  Defensive line
- Brock Hays (Grambling State)
  Running backs
- John Allen (James Madison)
  Outside receivers
- Trey Holtz (Ohio State)
  Inside receivers
- Kurt Hester (Tulane)
  Head strength and conditioning coach
- Krista Patrick
  Director of external football operation
- Paul Smith
  Director of internal football operations
- Ed Jackson
  Assistant A.D./character education
- Mac Goode
  Graduate assistant
- Ross Hornor
  Graduate assistant
- Jason Shumaker
  Director of football recruiting
- Jude Holloway
  Football video coordinator
- Dylan Griffin
  Assistant director of recruiting

Legend

- (C) Team captain
- (S) Suspended
- (I) Ineligible
- Injured
- Redshirt

Roster
Last update: April 15, 2020

== Schedule ==
Louisiana Tech announced its 2020 football schedule on January 8, 2020. The 2020 schedule consists of 5 home and 7 away games in the regular season.

The Bulldogs had games scheduled against Prairie View A&M, UNLV, and Vanderbilt, which were canceled due to the COVID-19 pandemic. On July 22, Louisiana Tech announced it had added a game against Houston Baptist as a replacement for Prairie View A&M.

Date	Time	Opponent	Site	TV	Result	Attendance
September 19	6:30 p.m.	at Southern Miss	M. M. Roberts Stadium; Hattiesburg, MS (Rivalry in Dixie)	ESPN2	W 31–30	7,140
September 26	6:00 p.m.	Houston Baptist*	Joe Aillet Stadium; Ruston, LA	ESPN3	W 66–38	7,140
October 2	8:00 p.m.	at No. 22 BYU*	LaVell Edwards Stadium; Provo, UT	ESPN2	L 14–45	0
October 10	6:30 p.m.	UTEP	Joe Aillet Stadium; Ruston, LA	ESPN2	W 21–17	7,140
October 17	5:00 p.m.	Marshall	Joe Aillet Stadium; Ruston, LA	CBSSN	L 17–35	7,140
October 24	7:00 p.m.	at UTSA	Alamodome; San Antonio, TX	ESPNU	L 26–27	6,114
October 31	2:30 p.m.	UAB	Joe Aillet Stadium; Ruston, LA	Stadium	W 37–34 ^{2OT}	7,140
December 3	6:00 p.m.	at North Texas	Apogee Stadium; Denton, TX	CBSSN	W 42–31	6,085
December 12	6:00 p.m.	at TCU*	Amon G. Carter Stadium; Fort Worth, TX	FS1	L 10–52	10,472
December 23	2:30 p.m.	vs. Georgia Southern*	Mercedes-Benz Superdome; New Orleans, LA (New Orleans Bowl)	ESPN	L 3–38	3,000
*Non-conference game; Rankings from AP Poll and CFP Rankings after November 24 released prior to game; All times are in Central time

== Game summaries ==
=== At Southern Miss ===
Louisiana Tech at Southern Mississippi

Team	1	2	3	4	Total
• Bulldogs	7	3	14	7	31
Golden Eagles	0	13	14	3	30

- Date: September 19, 2020
- Location: M. M. Roberts Stadium
  Hattiesburg, MS
- Game start: 6:35 p.m. CDT
- Elapsed time: 3 hours and 24 minutes
- Game attendance: 7,140
- Game weather: 74 °F (23 °C) • Weather: Partly Cloudy • Wind: 7 NE MPH
- Referee: Billy Wiliams
- TV announcers (ESPN2): Dave Pasch (play–by–play), Mike Golic Sr. (analyst), and Lauren Sisler (sideline reporter)

Scoring summary
1	01:49	LT	Griffin Hebert 5-yard pass from Aaron Allen (Jacob Barnes kick) (15 plays, 79 yards, 7:09)	LT 7–0
2	12:00	USM	Kevin Perkins 1-yard rush (two-point conversion rush attempt failed) (11 plays, 67 yards, 4:49)	LT 7–6
2	06:08	LT	Jacob Barnes 28-yard field goal (10 plays, 55 yards, 5:52)	LT 10–6
2	05:44	USM	Tim Jones 74-yard pass from Jack Abraham (Briggs Bourgeois kick) (1 play, 74 yards, 0:24)	USM 13–10
3	13:58	USM	Tim Jones 20-yard pass from Jack Abraham (Briggs Bourgeois kick) (1 play, 20 yards, 0:09)	USM 20–10
3	07:36	USM	Jason Brownlee 5-yard pass from Jack Abraham (Briggs Bourgeois kick) (8 plays, 55 yards, 3:51)	USM 27–10
3	05:31	LT	Adrian Hardy 32-yard pass from Luke Anthony (Jacob Barnes kick) (7 plays, 65 yards, 2:05)	USM 27–17
3	00:29	LT	Smoke Harris 35-yard pass from Luke Anthony (Jacob Barnes kick) (4 plays, 46 yards, 1:10)	USM 27–24
4	05:06	USM	Briggs Bourgeois 37-yard field goal (13 plays, 57 yards, 5:51)	USM 30–24
4	00:14	LT	Griffin Hebert 4-yard pass from Luke Anthony (Jacob Barnes kick) (17 plays, 74 yards, 5:51)	LT 31–30

Statistics	Louisiana Tech	Southern Miss
First downs	26	20
Total yards	381	377
Rushing yards	163	137
Passing yards	218	240
Turnovers	1	1
Time of possession	27:52	27:02

Team	Category	Player	Statistics
Louisiana Tech	Passing	Luke Anthony	13/21, 149 yards, 3 TDs
Louisiana Tech	Rushing	Justin Henderson	18 carries, 69 yards
Louisiana Tech	Receiving	Adrian Hardy	5 receptions, 79 yards, 1 TD
Southern Miss	Passing	Jack Abraham	23/31, 240 yards, 3 TDs, 1 INT
Southern Miss	Rushing	Don Ragsdale	11 carries, 56 yards
Southern Miss	Receiving	Tim Jones	8 receptions, 160 yards, 2 TDs

=== Houston Baptist ===
Houston Baptist at Louisiana Tech

Team	1	2	3	4	Total
Huskies	14	3	7	14	38
• Bulldogs	17	21	14	14	66

- Date: September 26, 2020
- Location: Joe Aillet Stadium
  Ruston, LA
- Game start: 6:05 p.m. CDT
- Elapsed time: 3 hours and 34 minutes
- Game attendance: 7,140
- Game weather: 82 °F (28 °C) • Weather: Sunny • Wind: 0 MPH
- Referee: Ken Antee
- TV announcers (ESPN3): Lyn Rollins (play–by–play) and Chris Mycoskie (analyst)

Scoring summary
1	11:59	LT	Jacob Barnes 51-yard field goal (4 plays, 0 yards, 0:23)	LT 3–0
1	08:29	HBU	Jerreth Sterns 4-yard pass from Bailey Zappe (Gino Garcia kick) (10 plays, 75 yards, 3:30)	HBU 7–3
1	07:24	LT	Wayne Toussant 44-yard pass from Luke Anthony (Jacob Barnes kick) (3 plays, 75 yards, 1:05)	LT 10–7
1	03:42	HBU	Ben Ratzlaff 6-yard pass from Bailey Zappe (Gino Garcia kick) (12 plays, 82 yards, 3:42)	HBU 14–10
1	00:49	LT	Wayne Toussant 43-yard pass from Luke Anthony (Jacob Barnes kick) (8 plays, 75 yards, 2:53)	LT 17–14
2	13:34	LT	Isaiah Graham 14-yard pass from Luke Anthony (Jacob Barnes kick) (4 plays, 72 yards, 1:08)	LT 24–14
2	12:01	LT	Justin Henderson 3-yard rush (Jacob Barnes kick) (1 play, 3 yards, 0:05)	LT 31–14
2	03:24	LT	Isaiah Graham 15-yard pass from Luke Anthony (Jacob Barnes kick) (10 plays, 81 yards, 4:56)	LT 38–14
2	00:15	HBU	Gino Garcia 42-yard field goal (11 plays, 50 yards, 3:09)	LT 38–17
3	09:48	HBU	Jerreth Sterns 2-yard pass from Bailey Zappe (Gino Garcia kick) (6 plays, 55 yards, 1:56)	LT 38–24
3	07:50	LT	Jawaun Johnson 41-yard pass from Luke Anthony (Jacob Barnes kick) (4 plays, 70 yards, 1:58)	LT 45–24
3	02:39	LT	Luke Anthony 1-yard rush (Jacob Barnes kick) (8 plays, 77 yards, 3:44)	LT 52–24
4	13:25	HBU	Ben Ratzlaff 1-yard pass from Bailey Zappe (Gino Garcia kick) (14 plays, 75 yards, 4:14)	LT 52–31
4	08:52	LT	Greg Garner 2-yard rush (Jacob Barnes kick) (10 plays, 60 yards, 4:33)	LT 59–31
4	05:42	HBU	Jerreth Sterns 1-yard pass from Bailey Zappe (Gino Garcia kick) (10 plays, 85 yards, 3:10)	LT 59–38
4	01:15	LT	Kyle Maxwell 7-yard pass from Westin Elliott (Jacob Barnes kick) (8 plays, 62 yards, 4:27)	LT 66–38

Statistics	Houston Baptist	Louisiana Tech
First downs	26	32
Total yards	501	542
Rushing yards	95	182
Passing yards	406	360
Turnovers	2	1
Time of possession	29:37	30:23

Team	Category	Player	Statistics
Houston Baptist	Passing	Bailey Zappe	37/58, 406 yards, 5 TDs, 1 INT
Houston Baptist	Rushing	Ean Beek	6 carries, 35 yards
Houston Baptist	Receiving	Jerreth Sterns	14 receptions, 138 yards, 3 TDs
Louisiana Tech	Passing	Luke Anthony	17/30, 314 yards, 5 TDs, 1 INT
Louisiana Tech	Rushing	Justin Henderson	11 carries, 77 yards, 1 TD
Louisiana Tech	Receiving	Wayne Toussant	3 receptions, 91 yards, 2 TDs

=== At BYU ===
Louisiana Tech at Brigham Young

Team	1	2	3	4	Total
Bulldogs	7	0	0	7	14
• No. 22 Cougars	7	21	10	7	45

- Date: October 2, 2020
- Location: LaVell Edwards Stadium
  Provo, UT
- Game start: 8:05 p.m. CDT
- Elapsed time: 3 hours and 23 minutes
- Game attendance: 0
- Game weather: Weather: Sunny • Wind: 0 MPH
- Referee: David Alvarez
- TV announcers (ESPN2): Dave Flemming (play–by–play), Andre Ware (analyst), and Stormy Buonantomy (sideline reporter)

Scoring summary
1	10:02	BYU	Zach Wilson 9-yard rush (Jake Oldroyd kick) (6 plays, 78 yards, 2:57)	BYU 7–0
1	06:51	LT	Smoke Harris 66-yard pass from Luke Anthony (Jacob Barnes kick) (6 plays, 82 yards, 3:11)	TIE 7–7
2	10:34	BYU	Carter Wheat 22-yard pass from Zach Wilson (Jake Oldroyd kick) (6 plays, 58 yards, 3:03)	BYU 14–7
2	05:07	BYU	Tyler Allgeier 1-yard rush (Jake Oldroyd kick) (9 plays, 58 yards, 3:30)	BYU 21–7
2	00:59	BYU	Gunner Romney 22-yard pass from Zach Wilson (Jake Oldroyd kick) (5 plays, 80 yards, 0:37)	BYU 28–7
3	11:35	BYU	Zach Wilson 1-yard rush (Jake Oldroyd kick) (7 plays, 75 yards, 3:25)	BYU 35–7
3	07:19	BYU	Jake Oldroyd 45-yard field goal (6 plays, 26 yards, 1:41)	BYU 38–7
4	13:25	BYU	Zach Wilson 14-yard rush (Jake Oldroyd kick) (10 plays, 71 yards, 5:01)	BYU 45–7
4	04:58	LT	Smoke Harris 4-yard pass from Luke Anthony (Jacob Barnes kick) (17 plays, 75 yards, 8:27)	BYU 45–14

Statistics	Louisiana Tech	BYU
First downs	18	26
Total yards	313	513
Rushing yards	74	188
Passing yards	239	325
Turnovers	2	0
Time of possession	30:12	29:48

Team	Category	Player	Statistics
Louisiana Tech	Passing	Luke Anthony	18/27, 191 yards, 2 TDs, 1 INT
Louisiana Tech	Rushing	Justin Henderson	13 carries, 29 yards
Louisiana Tech	Receiving	Smoke Harris	3 receptions, 82 yards, 2 TDs
BYU	Passing	Zach Wilson	24/26, 325 yards, 2 TDs
BYU	Rushing	Tyler Allgeier	10 carries, 93 yards, 1 TD
BYU	Receiving	Gunner Romney	7 receptions, 101 yards, 1 TD

=== UTEP ===
Texas–El Paso at Louisiana Tech

Team	1	2	3	4	Total
Miners	0	7	3	7	17
• Bulldogs	7	7	0	7	21

- Date: October 10, 2020
- Location: Joe Aillet Stadium
  Ruston, LA
- Game start: 6:35 p.m. CDT
- Elapsed time: 3 hours and 48 minutes
- Game attendance: 7,140
- Game weather: 75 °F (24 °C) • Weather: Partly Cloudy • Wind: N 5 MPH
- Referee: Joe Lehring
- TV announcers (ESPN2): Dave O'Brien (play–by–play), Mike Golic (analyst) and Ian Fitzsimmons (sideline reporter)

Scoring summary
1	11:23	LT	Israel Tucker 15-yard rush (Jacob Barnes kick) (10 plays, 75 yards, 3:37)	LT 7–0
2	09:56	UTEP	Devaughn Cooper 33-yard pass from Gavin Hardison (Gavin Baechle kick) (5 plays, 48 yards, 1:57)	TIE 7–7
2	01:36	LT	Justin Henderson 14-yard rush (Jacob Barnes kick) (9 plays, 72 yards, 3:32)	LT 14–7
3	09:02	UTEP	Gavin Baechle 29-yard field goal (8 plays, 33 yards, 3:31)	LT 14–10
4	11:47	LT	Israel Tucker 1-yard rush (Jacob Barnes kick) (13 plays, 60 yards, 5:33)	LT 21–10
4	11:32	UTEP	Duron Lowe 100-yard kickoff returned (Gavin Baechle kick) (0 plays, 0 yards, 0:00)	LT 21–17

Statistics	UTEP	Louisiana Tech
First downs	14	16
Total yards	266	210
Rushing yards	60	91
Passing yards	206	119
Turnovers	2	0
Time of possession	26:58	33:02

Team	Category	Player	Statistics
UTEP	Passing	Gavin Hardison	18/38, 206 yards, 1 TD, 1 INT
UTEP	Rushing	Deion Hankins	15 carries, 35 yards
UTEP	Receiving	Jacob Cowing	7 receptions, 63 yards
Louisiana Tech	Passing	Luke Anthony	11/20, 85 yards
Louisiana Tech	Rushing	Justin Henderson	15 carries, 54 yards, 1 TD
Louisiana Tech	Receiving	Adrian Hardy	4 receptions, 58 yards

=== Marshall ===
Marshall at Louisiana Tech

Team	1	2	3	4	Total
• Thundering Herd	7	7	14	7	35
Bulldogs	0	3	7	7	17

- Date: October 17, 2020
- Location: Joe Aillet Stadium
  Ruston, LA
- Game start: 5:02 p.m. CDT
- Elapsed time: 3 hours and 11 minutes
- Game attendance: 7,140
- Game weather: 70 °F (21 °C) • Weather: Partly Cloudy • Wind: S 10 MPH
- Referee: Chris Bynum
- TV announcers (CBS Sports Network): Rich Waltz (play–by–play), Aaron Murray (analyst), and AJ Ross (sideline reporter)

Scoring summary
1	05:36	MARSH	Grant Wells 1-yard rush (Shane Ciucci kick) (10 plays, 38 yards, 4:43)	MARSH 7–0
2	10:02	LT	Jacob Barnes 35-yard field goal (12 plays, 64 yards, 5:11)	MARSH 7–3
2	05:36	MARSH	Brenden Knox 1-yard rush (Shane Ciucci kick) (12 plays, 85 yards, 6:20)	MARSH 14–3
3	07:34	MARSH	Brenden Knox 7-yard rush (Shane Ciucci kick) (8 plays, 51 yards, 3:56)	MARSH 21–3
3	05:41	LT	Adrian Hardy 12-yard pass from Luke Anthony (Jacob Barnes kick) (5 plays, 77 yards, 1:53)	MARSH 21–10
3	03:09	MARSH	Artie Henry 46-yard pass from Grant Wells (Shane Ciucci kick) (5 plays, 75 yards, 2:32)	MARSH 28–10
4	11:03	MARSH	Corey Gammage 26-yard pass from Grant Wells (Shane Ciucci kick) (11 plays, 85 yards, 5:49)	MARSH 35–10
4	00:36	LT	Isaiah Graham 9-yard pass from Aaron Allen (Jacob Barnes kick) (11 plays, 87 yards, 4:45)	MARSH 35–17

Statistics	Marshall	Louisiana Tech
First downs	25	17
Total yards	402	267
Rushing yards	175	7
Passing yards	227	260
Turnovers	2	1
Time of possession	35:31	24:29

Team	Category	Player	Statistics
Marshall	Passing	Grant Wells	19/24, 227 yards, 2 TDs, 1 INT
Marshall	Rushing	Brenden Knox	32 carries, 125 yards, 2 TDs
Marshall	Receiving	Artie Henry	3 receptions, 72 yards, 1 TD
Louisiana Tech	Passing	Luke Anthony	18/25, 180 yards, 1 TD, 1 INT
Louisiana Tech	Rushing	Israel Tucker	4 carries, 20 yards
Louisiana Tech	Receiving	Adrian Hardy	9 receptions, 102 yards, 1 TD

=== At UTSA ===
Louisiana Tech at Texas–San Antonio

Team	1	2	3	4	Total
Bulldogs	3	16	7	0	26
• Roadrunners	3	3	7	14	27

- Date: October 24, 2020
- Location: Alamodome
  San Antonio, TX
- Game start: 7:04 p.m. CDT
- Elapsed time: 3 hours and 37 minutes
- Game attendance: 6,114
- Game weather: 74 °F (23 °C) • Weather: N/A (Indoors)
- Referee: Ken Antee
- TV announcers (ESPNU): Mike Couzens (play–by–play) and Jay Walker (analyst)

Scoring summary
1	08:50	LT	Jacob Barnes 27-yard field goal (13 plays, 63 yards, 6:10)	LT 3–0
1	04:28	UTSA	Hunter Duplessis 21-yard field goal (14 plays, 56 yards, 5:46)	TIE 3–3
2	14:03	LT	Jacob Barnes 46-yard field goal (6 plays, 14 yards, 1:59)	LT 6–3
2	09:22	LT	Jacob Barnes 22-yard field goal (10 plays, 29 yards, 3:49)	LT 9–3
2	06:36	UTSA	Hunter Duplessis 37-yard field goal (10 plays, 55 yards, 2:46)	LT 9–6
2	03:43	LT	Jacob Adams 13-yard pass from Luke Anthony (Jacob Barnes kick) (7 plays, 72 yards, 2:53)	LT 16–6
2	00:29	LT	Jacob Barnes 24-yard field goal (8 plays, 40 yards, 1:38)	LT 19–6
3	09:36	UTSA	Sincere McCormick 2-yard rush (Hunter Duplessis kick) (15 plays, 75 yards, 5:24)	LT 19–13
3	06:32	LT	Ezekial Barnett 60-yard interception returned (Jacob Barnes kick) (3 plays, 4 yards, 1:19)	LT 26–13
4	10:28	UTSA	Sincere McCormick 6-yard rush (Hunter Duplessis kick) (3 plays, 71 yards, 0:35)	LT 26–20
4	06:16	UTSA	Sincere McCormick 45-yard rush (Hunter Duplessis kick) (7 plays, 80 yards, 2:43)	UTSA 27–26

Statistics	Louisiana Tech	UTSA
First downs	15	25
Total yards	247	385
Rushing yards	78	188
Passing yards	169	197
Turnovers	2	2
Time of possession	27:39	32:21

Team	Category	Player	Statistics
Louisiana Tech	Passing	Luke Anthony	22/33, 148 yards, 1 TD
Louisiana Tech	Rushing	Israel Tucker	19 carries, 70 yards
Louisiana Tech	Receiving	Cee Jay Powell	8 receptions, 54 yards
UTSA	Passing	Frank Harris	18/33, 189 yards, 2 INTs
UTSA	Rushing	Sincere McCormick	37 carries, 165 yards, 3 TDs
UTSA	Receiving	Tykee Ogle-Kellogg	4 receptions, 96 yards

=== UAB ===
Alabama–Birmingham at Louisiana Tech

Team	1	2	3	4	OT	Total
Blazers	0	14	17	0	3	34
• Bulldogs	3	14	0	14	6	37

- Date: October 31, 2020
- Location: Joe Aillet Stadium
  Ruston, LA
- Game start: 2:36 p.m. CDT
- Elapsed time: 4 hours and 6 minutes
- Game attendance: 7,140
- Game weather: 64 °F (18 °C) • Weather: Sunny • Wind: S 5 MPH
- Referee: Rodney Burnette
- TV announcers (Stadium): Chris Hassel (play–by–play) and Max Browne (analyst)

Scoring summary
1	11:45	LT	Jacob Barnes 27-yard field goal (8 plays, 58 yards, 3:15)	LT 3–0
2	07:00	LT	Khalil Ladler 81-yard interception returned (Jacob Barnes kick) (7 plays, 80 yards, 3:51)	LT 10–0
2	06:48	UAB	DeWayne McBride 75-yard rush (Matt Quinn kick) (1 play, 75 yards, 0:12)	LT 10–7
2	01:42	UAB	Spencer Brown 6-yard rush (Matt Quinn kick) (6 plays, 98 yards, 2:33)	UAB 14–10
2	00:19	LT	Adrian Hardy 18-yard pass from Luke Anthony (Jacob Barnes kick) (4 plays, 53 yards, 1:23)	LT 17–14
3	12:55	UAB	DeWayne McBride 22-yard rush (Matt Quinn kick) (4 plays, 50 yards, 2:05)	UAB 21–17
3	11:11	UAB	Spencer Brown 10-yard rush (Matt Quinn kick) (2 plays, 14 yards, 0:48)	UAB 28–17
3	04:13	UAB	Matt Quinn 45-yard field goal (11 plays, 42 yards, 5:28)	UAB 31–17
4	14:54	LT	Jawaun Johnson 30-yard pass from Aaron Allen (Jacob Barnes kick) (2 plays, 45 yards, 0:27)	UAB 31–24
4	00:10	LT	Adrian Hardy 24-yard pass from Aaron Allen (Jacob Barnes kick) (13 plays, 90 yards, 1:55)	TIE 31–31
1OT		LT	Jacob Barnes 36-yard field goal (4 plays, 7 yards)	LT 34–31
1OT		UAB	Matt Quinn 42-yard field goal (6 plays, 1 yard)	TIE 34–34
2OT		LT	Jacob Barnes 35-yard field goal (7 plays, 8 yards)	LT 37–34

Statistics	UAB	Louisiana Tech
First downs	20	20
Total yards	485	381
Rushing yards	338	49
Passing yards	147	332
Turnovers	3	1
Time of possession	32:44	27:16

Team	Category	Player	Statistics
UAB	Passing	Tyler Johnston III	4/9, 81 yards
UAB	Rushing	Spencer Brown	29 carries, 140 yards, 2 TDs
UAB	Receiving	Austin Watkins Jr.	6 receptions, 95 yards
Louisiana Tech	Passing	Aaron Allen	18/26, 191 yards, 2 TDs
Louisiana Tech	Rushing	Israel Tucker	17 carries, 54 yards
Louisiana Tech	Receiving	Adrian Hardy	7 receptions, 101 yards, 2 TDs

=== At North Texas ===
Louisiana Tech at North Texas

Team	1	2	3	4	Total
• Bulldogs	7	21	14	0	42
Mean Green	14	3	7	7	31

- Date: December 3, 2020
- Location: Apogee Stadium
  Denton, TX
- Game start: 5:02 p.m. CST
- Elapsed time: 3 hours and 27 minutes
- Game attendance: 6,085
- Game weather: 46 °F (8 °C) • Weather: Cloudy • Wind: NNW 14 MPH
- Referee: Joe Lehring
- TV announcers (CBS Sports Network): Chris Hassel (play–by–play) and Sed Bonner (analyst)

Scoring summary
1	10:25	LT	Smoke Harris 12-yard rush (Jacob Barnes kick) (7 plays, 55 yards, 2:17)	LT 7–0
1	07:41	UNT	Jaelon Darden 13-yard pass from Jason Bean (Ethan Mooney kick) (9 plays, 70 yards, 2:44)	TIE 7–7
1	04:45	UNT	DeAndre Torrey 1-yard rush (Ethan Mooney kick) (5 plays, 75 yards, 1:10)	UNT 14–7
2	12:13	LT	Greg Garner 1-yard rush (Jacob Barnes kick) (17 plays, 68 yards, 7:32)	TIE 14–14
2	07:40	LT	Israel Tucker 2-yard rush (Jacob Barnes kick) (8 plays, 36 yards, 3:09)	LT 21–14
2	03:05	UNT	Ethan Mooney 48-yard field goal (12 plays, 39 yards, 4:35)	LT 21–17
2	00:13	LT	Kyle Maxwell 5-yard pass from Luke Anthony (Jacob Barnes kick) (9 plays, 64 yards, 2:52)	LT 28–17
3	05:13	LT	Smoke Harris 6-yard pass from Luke Anthony (Jacob Barnes kick) (12 plays, 53 yards, 5:22)	LT 35–17
3	04:23	UNT	Jaelon Darden 33-yard pass from Jason Bean (Ethan Mooney kick) (3 plays, 75 yards, 0:50)	LT 35–24
3	01:21	LT	Israel Tucker 1-yard rush (Jacob Barnes kick) (7 plays, 58 yards, 3:02)	LT 42–24
4	10:37	UNT	Jaelon Darden 10-yard pass from Jason Bean (Ethan Mooney kick) (8 plays, 52 yards, 2:03)	LT 42–31

Statistics	Louisiana Tech	North Texas
First downs	24	19
Total yards	341	386
Rushing yards	183	155
Passing yards	158	231
Turnovers	1	1
Time of possession	36:19	23:41

Team	Category	Player	Statistics
Louisiana Tech	Passing	Luke Anthony	13/20, 110 yards, 2 TDs, 1 INT
Louisiana Tech	Rushing	Israel Tucker	37 carries, 161 yards, 2 TDs
Louisiana Tech	Receiving	Smoke Harris	7 receptions, 40 yards, 1 TD
North Texas	Passing	Jason Bean	17/30, 231 yards, 3 TDs, 1 INT
North Texas	Rushing	Nic Smith	16 carries, 96 yards
North Texas	Receiving	Jaelon Darden	8 receptions, 135 yards, 3 TDs

=== At TCU ===
Louisiana Tech at Texas Christian

Team	1	2	3	4	Total
Bulldogs	0	0	3	7	10
• Horned Frogs	10	21	14	7	52

- Date: December 12, 2020
- Location: Amon G. Carter Stadium
  Fort Worth, TX
- Game start: 6:10 p.m. CST
- Elapsed time: 3 hours and 14 minutes
- Game attendance: 10,472
- Game weather: Weather: Sunny • Wind: SW 3 MPH
- Referee: Kevin Mar
- TV announcers (FoxSports1): Cory Provous (play–by–play) and Robert Smith (analyst)

Scoring summary
1	02:18	TCU	Griffin Kell 22-yard field goal (6 plays, 37 yards, 3:27)	TCU 3–0
1	01:17	TCU	Max Duggan 5-yard rush (Griffin Kell kick) (2 plays, 8 yards, 0:42)	TCU 10–0
2	14:33	TCU	Quentin Johnston 76-yard pass from Max Duggan (Griffin Kell kick) (1 play, 76 yards, 0:12)	TCU 17–0
2	11:56	TCU	Zach Evans 4-yard rush (Griffin Kell kick) (4 plays, 23 yards, 2:00)	TCU 24–0
2	02:11	TCU	Quentin Johnston 1-yard rush (Griffin Kell kick) (12 plays, 70 yards, 5:03)	TCU 31–0
3	14:46	TCU	Zach Evans 75-yard rush (Griffin Kell kick) (1 play, 75 yards, 0:14)	TCU 38–0
3	11:19	TCU	Kendre Miller 38-yard rush (Griffin Kell kick) (3 plays, 40 yards, 1:41)	TCU 45–0
3	05:48	LT	Jacob Barnes 34-yard field goal (8 plays, 9 yards, 2:54)	TCU 45–3
4	11:13	LT	Griffin Hebert 13-yard pass from Luke Anthony (Jacob Barnes kick) (14 plays, 83 yards, 7:22)	TCU 45–10
4	01:31	TCU	Kendre Miller 89-yard rush (Griffin Kell kick) (2 plays, 92 yards, 0:58)	TCU 52–10

Statistics	Louisiana Tech	TCU
First downs	15	15
Total yards	244	494
Rushing yards	52	333
Passing yards	192	161
Turnovers	3	1
Time of possession	34:17	25:43

Team	Category	Player	Statistics
Louisiana Tech	Passing	Luke Anthony	15/25, 161 yards, 1 TD
Louisiana Tech	Rushing	Israel Tucker	10 carries, 28 yards
Louisiana Tech	Receiving	Isaiah Graham	3 receptions, 44 yards
TCU	Passing	Max Duggan	10/13, 160 yards, 1 TD
TCU	Rushing	Kendre Miller	5 carries, 136 yards, 2 TDs
TCU	Receiving	Quentin Johnston	5 receptions, 133 yards, 1 TD

=== Vs. Georgia Southern (New Orleans Bowl) ===
Georgia Southern vs. Louisiana Tech

Team	1	2	3	4	Total
• Eagles	7	14	7	10	38
Bulldogs	0	3	0	0	3

- Date: December 23, 2020
- Location: Mercedes–Benz Superdome
  New Orleans, LA
- Game start: 2:04 p.m. CST
- Elapsed time: 3 hours and 8 minutes
- Game attendance: 3,000
- Game weather: Weather: N/A (Indoors)• Wind: None
- Referee: C. Lamertina
- TV announcers (ESPN): Matt Barrie (play–by–play), Mike Golic Jr. (analyst), and Dawn Davenport (sideline reporter)

Scoring summary
1	09:52	GASO	Shai Werts 1-yard rush (Alex Raynor kick) (10 plays, 65 yards, 5:08)	GASO 7–0
2	14:51	GASO	Khaleb Hood 65-yard pass from Shai Werts (Alex Raynor kick) (5 plays, 72 yards, 1:41)	GASO 14–0
2	06:26	GASO	Shai Werts 37-yard rush (Alex Raynor kick) (3 plays, 0 yards, 1:20)	GASO 21–0
2	00:09	LT	Jacob Barnes 45-yard field goal (4 plays, -7 yards, 0:22)	GASO 21–3
3	05:54	GASO	Shai Werts 1-yard rush (Alex Raynor kick) (4 plays, 47 yards, 1:29)	GASO 28–3
4	13:28	GASO	Alex Raynor 25-yard field goal (10 plays, 38 yards, 4:58)	GASO 31–3
4	03:07	GASO	Gerald Green 4-yard rush (Alex Raynor kick) (7 plays, 80 yards, 4:40)	GASO 38–3

Statistics	Georgia Southern	Louisiana Tech
First downs	17	15
Total yards	448	232
Rushing yards	322	113
Passing yards	126	119
Turnovers	0	4
Time of possession	34:27	25:33

Team	Category	Player	Statistics
Georgia Southern	Passing	Shai Werts	7/12, 126 yards, 1 TD
Georgia Southern	Rushing	Gerald Green	16 carries, 108 yards, 1 TD
Georgia Southern	Receiving	Khaleb Hood	1 reception, 65 yards, 1 TD
Louisiana Tech	Passing	JD Head	9/14, 78 yards, 1 INT
Louisiana Tech	Rushing	Israel Tucker	20 carries, 123 yards
Louisiana Tech	Receiving	Isaiah Graham	3 receptions, 26 yards

== Players drafted into the NFL ==
Round	Pick	Player	Position	NFL Club
3	73	Milton Williams	DT	Philadelphia Eagles
