= 2018 Camellia Bowl =

College football bowl game

2018 Raycom Media Camellia Bowl
- 5th Camellia Bowl
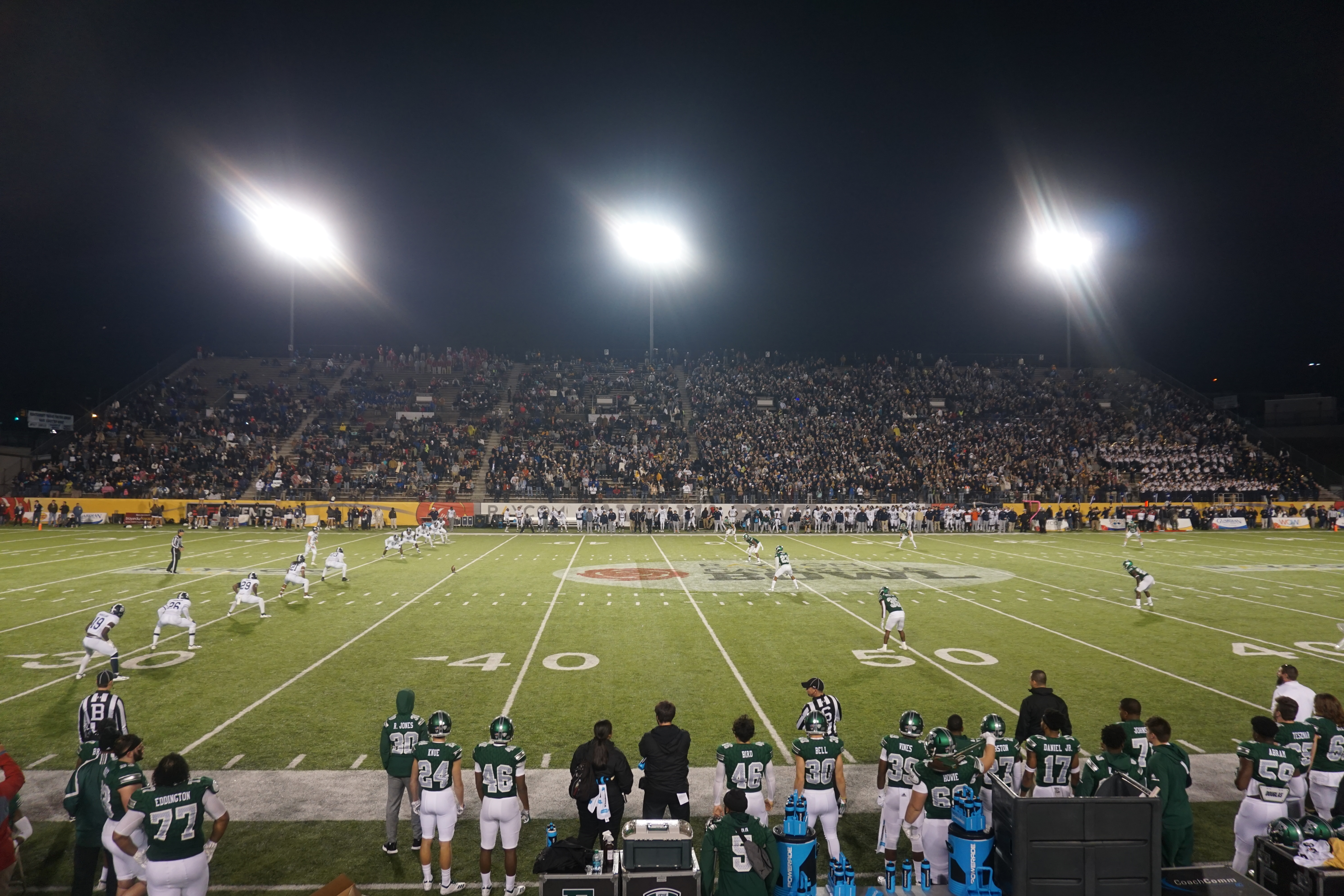
- 2018 Camellia Bowl kick-off
Georgia Southern Eagles	Eastern Michigan Eagles
(9–3)	(7–5)
Sun Belt	MAC
23	21
Head coach: Chad Lunsford	Head coach: Chris Creighton
	1	2	3	4	Total
Georgia Southern	7	10	0	6	23
Eastern Michigan	0	7	7	7	21
- Date: December 15, 2018
- Season: 2018
- Stadium: Cramton Bowl
- Location: Montgomery, Alabama
- MVP: Shai Werts (QB, Georgia Southern)
- Favorite: Georgia Southern by 1
- Referee: Anthony Calabrese (AAC)
- Attendance: 17,710
- Payout: US$250,000

United States TV coverage
- Network: ESPN & ESPN Radio
- Announcers: Mike Corey, Rene Ingoglia and Lauren Sisler (ESPN); Jay Alter and Ben Hartsock (ESPN Radio)

International TV coverage
- Network: ESPN Deportes
- Announcers: Eduardo Varela and Pablo Viruega

The 2018 Camellia Bowl was a college football bowl game played on December 15, 2018, with kickoff scheduled for 5:30 p.m. EST (4:30 p.m. local CST). It was the fifth edition of the Camellia Bowl, and one of the 2018–19 bowl games concluding the 2018 FBS football season. Sponsored by broadcasting company Raycom Media, the game was officially known as the Raycom Media Camellia Bowl.

== Teams ==
The game featured the Eastern Michigan Eagles from the Mid-American Conference (MAC) and the Georgia Southern Eagles of the Sun Belt Conference. This was the first meeting between the two programs.

=== Georgia Southern Eagles ===
On November 28, Georgia-based news organizations reported that Georgia Southern would play in the Camellia Bowl, which was confirmed via an official announcement on December 2. They entered the bowl with a 9–3 record (6–2 in conference). The Eagles had previously played in one bowl game, winning the 2015 GoDaddy Bowl over Bowling Green; before 2014, the team competed in the Football Championship Subdivision (formerly known as Division I-AA).

=== Eastern Michigan Eagles ===
Eastern Michigan received and accepted a bid to the Camellia Bowl on December 2. The Eagles entered the bowl with a 7–5 record (5–3 in conference). This was the Eagles' second bowl game in the last three years, having also played in the 2016 Bahamas Bowl where they were defeated by Old Dominion, 24–20.

== Game summary ==
=== Scoring summary ===
Scoring summary

Quarter	Time	Drive			Team	Scoring information	Score	
Quarter	Time	Plays	Yards	TOP	Team	Scoring information	GASO	EMU
1	1:52	15	95	9:01	GASO	Shai Werts 26-yard touchdown run, Tyler Bass kick good	7	0
2	7:53	6	50	3:15	EMU	Tyler Lyle 1-yard touchdown reception from Mike Glass, Chad Ryland kick good	7	7
2	3:48	7	82	4:05	GASO	Shai Werts 5-yard touchdown run, Tyler Bass kick good	14	7
2	0:00	9	29	2:46	GASO	50-yard field goal by Tyler Bass	17	7
3	14:17	1	75	0:15	EMU	Arthur Jackson 75-yard touchdown reception from Mike Glass, Chad Ryland kick good	17	14
4	9:49	8	38	4:12	GASO	35-yard field goal by Tyler Bass	20	14
4	3:33	16	75	6:16	EMU	Arthur Jackson 5-yard touchdown reception from Mike Glass, Chad Ryland kick good	20	21
4	0:00	9	52	3:33	GASO	40-yard field goal by Tyler Bass	23	21
"TOP" = time of possession. For other American football terms, see Glossary of American football.							23	21

=== Statistics ===
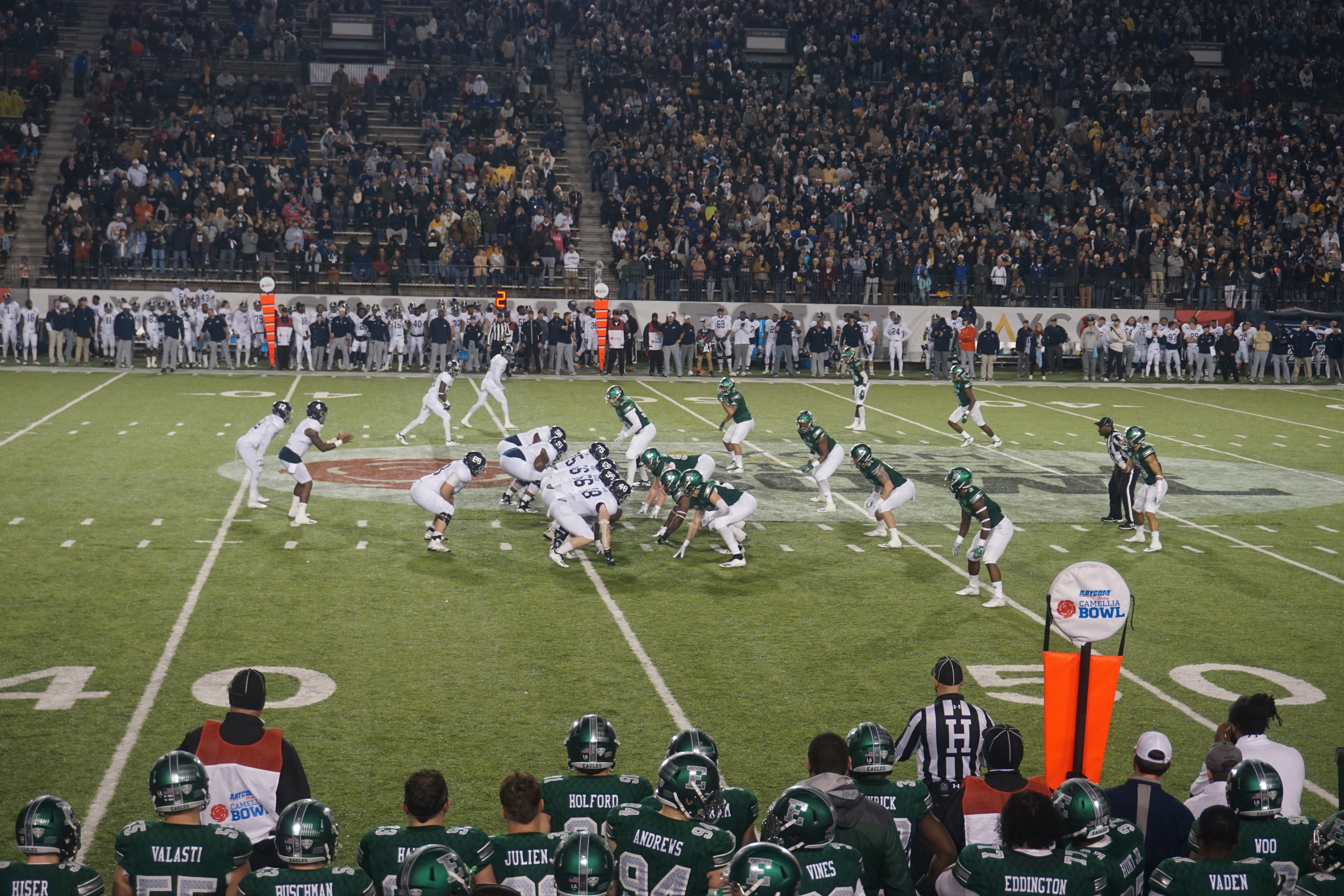
Georgia Southern on offense during the game

	1	2	3	4	Total
GASO Eagles	7	10	0	6	23
EMU Eagles	0	7	7	7	21

Statistics	GASO	EMU
First downs	18	14
Plays–yards	65–364	50–301
Rushes–yards	58–331	24–97
Passing yards	33	204
Passing: Comp–Att–Int	4–7–0	17–26–0
Time of possession	37:38	22:22

Team	Category	Player	Statistics
Georgia Southern	Passing	Shai Werts	4/7, 33 yds
Georgia Southern	Rushing	Wesley Kennedy III	9 car, 107 yds
Georgia Southern	Receiving	Ellis Richardson	1 rec, 15 yds
Eastern Michigan	Passing	Mike Glass	17/25, 204 yds, 3 TD
Eastern Michigan	Rushing	Willie Parker	9 car, 44 yds
Eastern Michigan	Receiving	Arthur Jackson	3 rec, 86 yds, 2 TD
