= 2020 Louisiana Ragin' Cajuns football team =

American college football season

2020 Louisiana Ragin' Cajuns football

Sun Belt Conference co-champion Sun Belt West Division champion First Responder Bowl champion

First Responder Bowl, W 31–24 vs. UTSA
- Conference: Sun Belt Conference
- West Division

Ranking
- Coaches: No. 16
- AP: No. 15
- Record: 10–1 (7–1 Sun Belt)
- Head coach: Billy Napier (3rd season)
- Offensive coordinator: Rob Sale (3rd season)
- Offensive scheme: Pro-style
- Defensive coordinator: Patrick Toney (1st season)
- Base defense: 4–2–5
- Home stadium: Cajun Field

2020 Sun Belt Conference football standings
	Conf.			Overall
Team	W		L	W		L
East Division
No. 14 Coastal Carolina xy+	8	–	0	11	–	1
Appalachian State	6	–	2	9	–	3
Georgia Southern	4	–	4	8	–	5
Georgia State	4	–	4	6	–	4
Troy	3	–	4	5	–	6
West Division
No. 15 Louisiana xy+	7	–	1	10	–	1
South Alabama	3	–	5	4	–	7
Arkansas State	2	–	6	4	–	7
Texas State	2	–	6	2	–	10
Louisiana–Monroe	0	–	7	0	–	10
Championship: Louisiana at Coastal Carolina (Canceled)
+ – Conference co-champions; x – Division champion/co-champions; y – Championship game participant; Rankings from AP Poll

The 2020 Louisiana Ragin' Cajuns football team represented the University of Louisiana at Lafayette in the 2020 NCAA Division I FBS football season. The Ragin' Cajuns played their home games at Cajun Field in Lafayette, Louisiana, and competed in the West Division of the Sun Belt Conference. They were led by third-year head coach Billy Napier. The Cajuns began the season with an away matchup against a preseason top-25 Iowa State and concluded their regular season at conference and in-state rival Louisiana–Monroe.

Shortly before the season began, Offensive Line Assistant Coach D. J. Looney, 31, died of a heart attack while at practice on August 1, 2020. He was honored at the Week 9 matchup against UAB in his hometown of Birmingham, Alabama, where players all wore Looney's name on their jerseys.

The win over Iowa State marked the first victory against a ranked team on the road in team history, the second victory ever against a ranked team, and the highest ranked team ever defeated. The following week, the Cajuns were nationally ranked for the first time since the 1940s, reaching 19th in the AP Poll. During their Week 2 overtime victory against Georgia State, the Cajuns secured their first victory in overtime since the 2005 conference matchup against the Troy Trojans. During Week 14, Louisiana was ranked for the first time ever in the College Football Playoff rankings, at No. 25. This was also the first time the Cajuns had been ranked in the three major college football rankings (No. in the 20 AP Poll, No. 21 in the Coaches Poll, and No. 25 in the CFP rankings). During Week 14, the Cajuns defeated Appalachian State for the first time in school history, bringing their all-time record against the Mountaineers to 1–8.

The Cajuns ended their season by defeating the UTSA Roadrunners in the 2020 First Responder Bowl. Senior RB Elijah Mitchell earned the bowl game MVP. This also marked the first time a Sun Belt team took part in that bowl game.

== Preseason ==
=== Recruiting class ===
College recruiting
Name	Hometown	School	Height	Weight	40^{‡}	Commit date
Trey Amos; CB	New Iberia, LA	Catholic HS	6 ft 0 in (1.83 m)	175 lb (79 kg)	–	Dec 18, 2019
Trey Amos; CB	Recruit ratings: Scout: Rivals: 247Sports: ESPN:					
Caleb Anderson; CB	Clinton, LA	East Feliciana HS	6 ft 2 in (1.88 m)	190 lb (86 kg)	–	Dec 18, 2019
Caleb Anderson; CB	Recruit ratings: Scout: Rivals: 247Sports: ESPN:					
Emani Bailey; RB	Denton, TX	Denton Ryan HS	5 ft 9 in (1.75 m)	200 lb (91 kg)	–	Dec 18, 2019
Emani Bailey; RB	Recruit ratings: Scout: Rivals: 247Sports: ESPN:					
Dontae Fleming; WR	LaPlace, LA	East St. John HS	6 ft 1 in (1.85 m)	165 lb (75 kg)	–	Dec 18, 2019
Dontae Fleming; WR	Recruit ratings: Scout: Rivals: 247Sports: ESPN:					
Courtline Flowers; CB	Dallas, TX	South Oak Cliff HS	6 ft 1 in (1.85 m)	175 lb (79 kg)	–	Dec 18, 2019
Courtline Flowers; CB	Recruit ratings: Scout: Rivals: 247Sports: ESPN:					
Dabari Hawkins; CB	Missouri City, TX	Stafford HS	6 ft 3 in (1.91 m)	190 lb (86 kg)	–	Dec 18, 2019
Dabari Hawkins; CB	Recruit ratings: Scout: Rivals: 247Sports: ESPN:					
Sonny Hazard; DL	New Orleans, LA	Jesuit HS	6 ft 1 in (1.85 m)	290 lb (130 kg)	–	Dec 18, 2019
Sonny Hazard; DL	Recruit ratings: Scout: Rivals: 247Sports: ESPN:					
Reginald Johnson; WR	Baton Rouge, LA	Southern Lab	6 ft 0 in (1.83 m)	175 lb (79 kg)	–	Feb 5, 2020
Reginald Johnson; WR	Recruit ratings: Scout: Rivals: 247Sports: ESPN:					
Ahmad Johnson; LB	Pelahatchie, MS	Pelahatchie Attendance Center	6 ft 1 in (1.85 m)	215 lb (98 kg)	–	Dec 18, 2019
Ahmad Johnson; LB	Recruit ratings: Scout: Rivals: 247Sports: ESPN:					
Kyren Lacy; WR	Thibodaux, LA	Thibodaux HS	6 ft 2 in (1.88 m)	210 lb (95 kg)	–	Dec 18, 2019
Kyren Lacy; WR	Recruit ratings: Scout: Rivals: 247Sports: ESPN:					
Jordan Lawson; DL	Branson, MS	Brandon HS	6 ft 3 in (1.91 m)	270 lb (120 kg)	–	Feb 5, 2020
Jordan Lawson; DL	Recruit ratings: Scout: Rivals: 247Sports: ESPN:					
Cory Marshall; OL	Shreveport, LA	Northwood HS	6 ft 3 in (1.91 m)	330 lb (150 kg)	–	Dec 18, 2019
Cory Marshall; OL	Recruit ratings: Scout: Rivals: 247Sports: ESPN:					
Jack McKenzie; OL	McComb, MS	Parklane Academy	6 ft 3 in (1.91 m)	330 lb (150 kg)	–	Dec 18, 2019
Jack McKenzie; OL	Recruit ratings: Scout: Rivals: 247Sports: ESPN:					
Andray Pope; RB	Evergreen, AL	Hillcrest HS	6 ft 1 in (1.85 m)	200 lb (91 kg)	–	Dec 18, 2019
Andray Pope; RB	Recruit ratings: Scout: Rivals: 247Sports: ESPN:					
Dominique Ratcliff; DL	Conroe, TX	Conroe HS	6 ft 2 in (1.88 m)	270 lb (120 kg)	–	Dec 18, 2019
Dominique Ratcliff; DL	Recruit ratings: Scout: Rivals: 247Sports: ESPN:					
Errol Rogers Jr. WR	Lafayette, LA	Lafayette Christian Academy	5 ft 11 in (1.80 m)	185 lb (84 kg)	–	Dec 18, 2019
Errol Rogers Jr. WR	Recruit ratings: Scout: Rivals: 247Sports: ESPN:					
Christian Sabatini; TE	Plano, TX	Plano Senior HS	6 ft 2 in (1.88 m)	245 lb (111 kg)	–	Dec 18, 2019
Christian Sabatini; TE	Recruit ratings: Scout: Rivals: 247Sports: ESPN:					
Tyree Skipper; S	New Orleans, LA	Sophie B. Wright Charter	6 ft 1 in (1.85 m)	185 lb (84 kg)	–	Dec 18, 2019
Tyree Skipper; S	Recruit ratings: Scout: Rivals: 247Sports: ESPN:					

=== Award watch lists ===
Listed in the order that they were released

==== Preseason ====
Award	Player	Position	Year
Davey O'Brien Award	Levi Lewis	QB	Senior
Doak Walker Award	Elijah Mitchell	RB	Senior
Doak Walker Award	Trey Ragas	RB	Senior
Outland Trophy	O'Cyrus Torrence	OL	Sophomore
Ray Guy Award	Rhys Burns	P	Junior
Wuerffel Trophy	Jalen Williams	WR	R-Senior
Maxwell Award	Levi Lewis	QB	Senior

==== Season/Postseason ====
Award	Player	Position	Year
Rimington Trophy	Shane Vallot	OL	R-Junior
FWAA Freshman-All American	Kyren Lacy	WR	Freshman
Mayo Clinic Comeback Player of the Year	Ken Marks	OL	R-Senior

=== Sun Belt coaches poll ===
The Sun Belt coaches poll was released on August 25, 2020. The Cajuns were picked to finish first in the West with 47 votes and second in the conference behind Appalachian State.

West Division
Predicted finish	Team	Votes
1	Louisiana	47 (7)
2	Arkansas State	40 (2)
3	South Alabama	22 (1)
4	Texas State	21
5	Louisiana–Monroe	20

East Division
Predicted finish	Team	Votes
1	Appalachian State	49 (9)
2	Georgia Southern	36
3	Troy	32 (1)
4	Georgia State	20
5	Coastal Carolina	13

=== Sun Belt Preseason All-Conference teams ===
Offense

1st team

- Elijah Mitchell (LA, SR, Running Back)

2nd team

- Levi Lewis (LA, SR, Quarterback)
- Trey Ragas (LA, R-SR, Running Back)
- Max Mitchell (LA, JR, Offensive Lineman)
- O'Cyrus Torrence (LA, SO, Offensive Lineman)

Defense

1st team

- Joe Dillon (LA, R-SR, Linebacker)

2nd team

- Zi'Yon Hill (LA, R-JR, Defensive Lineman)
- Eric Garror (LA, JR, Cornerback)

Special teams

1st team

- Rhys Burns (LA, JR, Punter)

2nd teams

- Eric Garror (LA, JR, Return Specialist)

=== Athlon Sports Sun Belt Preseason All-Conference teams ===
Offense

1st team

- Elijah Mitchell – SR, running back
- Max Mitchell – JR, offensive line

2nd team

- Levi Lewis – SR, quarterback
- Trey Ragas – R-SR, running back

3rd team

- O'Cyrus Torrence – SO, offensive line

4th team

- Jamal Bell – SR, wide receiver
- Shane Vallot – R-JR, offensive line

Defense

1st team

- Joe Dillon – R-SR, linebacker

2nd team

- Zi'Yon Hill – R-JR, defensive line
- Percy Butler – JR, Safety

3rd team

- Chauncey Manac – R-SR, linebacker
- Eric Garror – JR, cornerback

4th team

- Kris Moncrief – JR, linebacker
- Asjlin Washington – JR, cornerback
- Kam Pedescleaux – R-SO, safety

Special teams

1st team

- Rhys Burns – JR, punter
- Eric Garror – JR, return specialist

=== Lindy's Sports Sun Belt Preseason All-Conference teams ===
During the announcement, Lindy's also picked the Cajuns to win their third-consecutive Sun Belt West Division Championship as well as named Senior running back Elijah Mitchell to the Preseason Sun Belt Offensive Player of the Year.

Offense

1st team

- Elijah Mitchell – SR, running back

2nd team

- Levi Lewis – SR, quarterback
- Trey Ragas – R-SR, running back

Defense

1st team

- Joe Dillon – R-SR, linebacker

2nd team

- Zi'Yon Hill – R-JR, defensive line

Special teams

1st team

- Rhys Burns – JR, punter

References':

== Personnel ==
2020 Louisiana Ragin' Cajuns football team roster
Players
Coaches
Offense

Pos.	#	Name	Class
QB	1	Levi Lewis	Sr
WR	2	Kyren Lacy	Fr
WR	3	Golden Eke	So
WR	4	Cassius Allen	So
WR	6	Errol Rogers Jr.	Fr
WR	7	Brian Smith Jr.	Sr
QB	8	Jai'Ave Magalei	Jr
RB	9	Trey Ragas	Sr
QB	10	Clifton McDowell	Fr
WR	11	Calif Gossett	Jr
WR	13	Dalen Cambre	Fr
RB	15	Elijah Mitchell	Sr
QB	16	Chandler Fields	Fr
WR	17	Dontae Fleming	Fr
WR	18	Jalen Williams	Sr
WR	19	Jamal Bell	Sr
RB	20	Emani Bailey	Fr
RB	21	Chris Smith	So
WR	22	Amir McDaniel	Fr
RB	23	T. J. Wisham	Jr
TE	24	Pearse Migl	So
QB	25	Beau Kalbacher	Sr
WR	26	Kaleb Carter	So
WR	27	Trevor Russell	Jr
WR	29	Peter LeBlanc	So
RB	30	Jordan Griffin	So
RB	31	Michael Orphey Jr.	So
RB	33	Andray Pope	Fr
RB	34	Mike Martin	Fr
TE	40	Dravyn Guilbeau	Fr
TE	41	Joe Lombardi Jr.	Fr
TE	44	Christian Sabatini	Fr
OL	50	Nate Thomas	Fr
OL	51	Landon Burton	Fr
OL	53	AJ Gillie	Fr
OL	54	Tyler Brown	Fr
OL	55	Zach Robertson	Sr
OL	58	O'Cyrus Torrence	So
OL	61	Cole Prudhomme	Sr
OL	63	Spencer Gardner	Jr
OL	64	Shane Vallot	Jr
OL	65	Carlos Rubio	Jr
OL	67	Ken Marks	Sr
OL	69	Jack McKenzie	Fr
OL	70	Jax Harrington	Fr
OL	71	Masry Mapieu	Jr
OL	72	Max Yarbrough	So
OL	73	David Hudson	Jr
OL	74	Max Mitchell	Jr
OL	75	Cory Marshall	Fr
OL	77	King McGowen	Fr
OL	78	Luke Junkunc	So
OL	79	Logan Newell	Fr
WR	80	Devon Pauley	So
WR	81	Reginald Johnson Jr.	Fr
TE	83	Damani Burrell	So
WR	84	Leroy Franklin	Sr
TE	85	Peyton Aucoin	Sr
WR	86	Jacob Bernard	Fr
TE	87	Neal Johnson	So
TE	88	Johnny Lumpkin	Jr
TE	89	Hunter Bergeron	Jr

Defense

Pos.	#	Name	Class
S	0	Kam Pedescleaux	So
LB	2	Lorenzo McCaskill	Jr
LB	3	Joe Dillon	Sr
DL	4	Zi'Yon Hill	Jr
LB	6	Kris Moncrief	Jr
LB	7	Ferrod Gardner	Sr
DL	8	Kendall Wilkerson	So
S	9	Percy Butler	Jr
LB	10	Andre Jones Jr.	Jr
CB	11	Caleb Anderson	Fr
S	13	Patrick Mensah	So
S	15	Tyree Skipper	Fr
CB	16	Asjlin Washington	Jr
LB	17	Chauncey Manac	Sr
CB	18	Bobby Holmes	Fr
CB	19	Eric Garror	Jr
CB	20	Mekhi Garner	So
CB	21	Trey Amos	Fr
CB	22	Korian Wilson	Fr
CB	23	Courtline Flowers	Fr
S	24	Bralen Trahan	Jr
S	25	Brandon Bishop	So
S	26	Blair Brooks	Sr
S	27	Cameron Solomon	Sr
S	28	Ja'Len Johnson	Jr
CB	29	Dabari Hawkins	Fr
LB	31	Brontre' Griffin	Fr
LB	33	Tyler Guidry	So
S	34	Scottie Johnson	Fr
LB	35	Ahmad Johnson	Fr
LB	37	Jordan Anthony	Fr
DL	38	Dominique Ratcliff	Fr
CB	39	Jayrin Wilson	Jr
CB	40	Patrick Marshall	Fr
S	41	Ty'Darien Quinney	Fr
LB	43	Jourdon Quibodeaux	Jr
LB	44	Tanner Wiggins	Jr
CB	45	Caleb Glenn	Jr
DL	46	Jordan Lawson	Fr
LB	48	Troy Krutchen	Jr
LB	51	Lakeidrick George Jr.	So
LB	52	Cooper LeBlanc	So
LB	53	Kyle Pierre	Jr
LB	56	Terrence Jones	Sr
LB	57	La'Kamion Franklin	Fr
DL	90	Mason Narcisse	Fr
DL	91	Sonny Hazard	Fr
DL	93	Quintlan Cobb	Fr
DL	94	Dalvin Hutchinson	So
LB	95	Andre Riley	So
DL	96	Malcolm Rollins	Jr
DL	97	Ja'Quane Nelson	Jr
DL	98	Andre Landry	Jr
DL	99	Tayland Humphrey	Sr

Special teams

Pos.	#	Name	Class
K	36	Nate Snyder	Jr
K	45	Kenneth Almendares	So
P	47	Rhys Byrns	Jr
LS	49	Paul Boudreaux	Jr
K	84	Thomas Leo	Fr

Head coach

- Billy Napier (Furman)

Coordinators/assistant coaches

- Rob Sale (LSU)
  Offensive coordinator/OL
- Patrick Toney (Southeastern Louisiana)
  Defensive coordinator/S
- Robby Discher (Sam Houston State)
  Special teams coordinator/defensive assistant
- Michael Desormeaux (Louisiana)
  Tight ends
- Jabbar Juluke (Southern)
  Running backs
- Tim Leger (McNeese State)
  Recruiting coordinator/WR
- Rory Segrest (Alabama)
  Defensive line
- LaMar Morgan (Louisiana)
  Cornerbacks
- Austin Armstrong (Huntingdon)
  Inside linebackers

Legend

- (C) Team captain
- (S) Suspended
- (I) Ineligible
- Injured
- Redshirt

Roster
Last update: July 4, 2020

== Schedule ==
The 2020 schedule consists of 6 home and 6 away games in the regular season. The Ragin' Cajuns will travel to Sun Belt foes Appalachian State, Georgia State, Texas State and Louisiana–Monroe. The Cajuns will play host to Sun Belt foes Georgia Southern, Coastal Carolina, Arkansas State, and South Alabama.

The Ragin' Cajuns will host one of the three non-conference opponents at Cajun Field, Central Arkansas, from NCAA Division I FCS, and will travel to Iowa State of the Big 12 and UAB of the C-USA.

Louisiana had a game against Missouri and Wyoming, which were canceled due to the COVID-19 pandemic.

On August 12, the Cajuns and Iowa State reached an agreement to play each other. This game will replace the Cajuns' Wyoming game that was canceled.

On August 13, New Mexico State decided to postpone all their fall sports to the spring. This canceled their October 23 contest with Louisiana.

On August 17, McNeese pulled out of the agreement to play Louisiana in the Herbert Heymann Classic on September 5.

On August 20, the Cajuns reached agreements with UAB and Central Arkansas to play them away on October 23 and home on November 21, respectively.

Date	Time	Opponent	Rank	Site	TV	Result	Attendance
September 12	11:00 a.m.	at No. 23 Iowa State*		Jack Trice Stadium; Ames, IA	ESPN	W 31–14	0
September 19	11:00 a.m.	at Georgia State	No. 19	Center Parc Stadium; Atlanta, GA	ESPN2	W 34–31 ^{OT}	4,126
September 26	11:00 a.m.	Georgia Southern	No. 19	Cajun Field; Lafayette, LA	ESPN2	W 20–18	5,585
October 14	6:30 p.m.	Coastal Carolina	No. 21	Cajun Field; Lafayette, LA	ESPN	L 27–30	5,585
October 23	7:00 p.m.	at UAB*		Legion Field; Birmingham, AL	CBSSN	W 24–20	11,610
October 31	7:00 p.m.	at Texas State		Bobcat Stadium; San Marcos, TX	ESPNU	W 44–34	7,500
November 7	11:00 a.m.	Arkansas State^{†}		Cajun Field; Lafayette, LA	ESPNU	W 27–20	5,585
November 14	1:00 p.m.	South Alabama	No. 25	Cajun Field; Lafayette, LA	ESPN+	W 38–10	5,585
November 28	2:00 p.m.	at Louisiana–Monroe		Malone Stadium; Monroe, LA (Battle on the Bayou)	ESPN3	W 70–20	3,132
December 4	7:00 p.m.	at Appalachian State	No. 25	Kidd Brewer Stadium; Boone, NC	ESPN2	W 24–21	2,170
~~December 19~~	~~3:30 p.m.~~	at No. 12 ~~Coastal Carolina~~	No. 19	~~Brooks Stadium~~; ~~Conway, SC~~ (~~Sun Belt Championship Game~~)	~~ESPN~~	No Contest	–
December 26	2:30 p.m.	vs. UTSA*	No. 19	Gerald J. Ford Stadium; University Park, TX (First Responder Bowl)	ABC	W 31–24	3,512
*Non-conference game; ^{†}Homecoming; Rankings from AP Poll and CFP Rankings after November 24 released prior to game; All times are in Central time

Schedule source:

== Game summaries ==
=== At Iowa State ===
Louisiana at Iowa State

Team	1	2	3	4	Total
• Ragin' Cajuns	0	10	7	14	31
No. 23 Cyclones	0	14	0	0	14

- Date: September 12, 2020
- Location: Jack Trice Stadium
  Ames, IA
- Game start: 11:02 a.m. CDT
- Elapsed time: 3 hours and 16 minutes
- Game attendance: 0
- Game weather: 63 °F (17 °C) • Weather: Mostly Cloudy • Wind: Light
- Referee: Tuta Salaam
- TV announcers (ESPN): Tom Hart (play–by–play), Mike Golic (analyst), and Cole Cubelic (sideline reporter)

Scoring summary
2	04:28	ISU	Kene Nwangwu 1-yard rush (Connor Assalley kick) (8 plays, 49 yards, 3:24)	ISU 7–0
2	04:14	LA	Chris Smith 95-yard kickoff returned (Nate Snyder kick) (0 plays, 0 yards, 0:00)	TIE 7–7
2	01:17	ISU	Breece Hall 11-yard rush (Connor Assalley kick) (7 plays, 69 yards, 2:57)	ISU 14–7
2	00:00	LA	Nate Snyder 30-yard field goal (9 plays, 61 yards, 1:17)	ISU 14–10
3	02:02	LA	Peter LeBlanc 78-yard pass from Levi Lewis (Kenneth Almendares kcik) (1 play, 78 yards, 0:12)	LA 17–14
4	13:58	LA	Eric Garror 83-yard punt returned (Kenneth Almendares kick) (6 plays, 16 yards, 3:04)	LA 24–14
4	00:10	LA	Trey Ragas 2-yard rush (Kenneth Almendares kick) (11 plays, 56 yards, 7:01)	LA 31–14

Statistics	Louisiana	Iowa State
First downs	14	18
Total yards	272	303
Rushing yards	118	158
Passing yards	154	145
Turnovers	0	2
Time of possession	27:41	32:19

Team	Category	Player	Statistics
Louisiana	Passing	Levi Lewis	13/21, 154 yards, 1 TD
Louisiana	Rushing	Trey Ragas	14 carries, 49 yards, 1 TD
Louisiana	Receiving	Peter LeBlanc	5 receptions, 82 yards, 1 TD
Iowa State	Passing	Brock Purdy	16/35, 145 yards, 1 INT
Iowa State	Rushing	Breece Hall	20 carries, 103 yards, 1 TD
Iowa State	Receiving	Xavier Hutchinson	4 receptions, 43 yards

=== At Georgia State ===
Louisiana at Georgia State

Team	1	2	3	4	OT	Total
• No. 19 Ragin' Cajuns	0	7	14	7	6	34
Panthers	7	7	7	7	3	31

- Date: September 19, 2020
- Location: Center Parc Stadium
  Atlanta, GA
- Game start: 11:01 a.m. CDT
- Elapsed time: 3 hours and 43 minutes
- Game attendance: 4,126
- Game weather: 71 °F (22 °C) • Weather: Cloudy • Wind: 13 E MPH
- Referee: Kyle Olson
- TV announcers (ESPN2): Wes Durham (play–by–play), Roddy Jones (analyst), and Paul Carcaterra (sideline reporter)

Scoring summary
1	03:30	GSU	Cornelius Brown IV 12-yard rush (Noel Ruiz kick) (7 plays, 70 yards, 2:22)	GSU 7–0
2	13:25	GSU	Cornelius Brown IV 28-yard pass to Roger Carter (Noel Ruiz kick) (10 plays, 90 yards, 2:53)	GSU 14–0
2	01:33	LA	Levi Lewis 18-yard pass to Chris Smith (Nathanael Snyder kick) (9 plays, 80 yards, 1:43)	GSU 14–7
3	10:49	GSU	Marcus Carroll 2-yard rush (Noel Ruiz kick) (9 plays, 66 yards, 3:05)	GSU 21–7
3	06:15	LA	Levi Lewis 4-yard pass to Kyren Lacy (Nathanael Snyder kick) (7 plays, 86 yards, 4:26)	GSU 21–14
3	03:02	LA	Elijah Mitchell 59-yard rush (Nathanael Snyder kick) (5 plays, 77 yards, 2:16)	TIE 21–21
4	11:54	LA	Trey Ragas 2-yard rush (Nathanael Snyder kick) (4 plays, 63 yards, 1:46)	LA 28–21
4	07:37	GSU	Destin Coates 4-yard rush (Noel Ruiz kick) (13 plays, 75 yards, 4:17)	TIE 28–28
1OT		GSU	Noel Ruiz 15-yard field goal (5 plays, 17 yards)	GSU 31–28
1OT		LA	Elijah Mitchell 12-yard rush (4 plays, 25 yards)	LA 34–31

Statistics	Louisiana	Georgia State
First downs	23	26
Total yards	519	419
Rushing yards	240	223
Passing yards	279	196
Turnovers	2	2
Time of possession	28:44	30:10

Team	Category	Player	Statistics
Louisiana	Passing	Levi Lewis	21/37, 279 yards, 2 TDs, 2 INTs
Louisiana	Rushing	Elijah Mitchell	16 carries, 164 yards, 2 TDs
Louisiana	Receiving	Dontae Fleming	4 receptions, 81 yards
Georgia State	Passing	Cornelius Brown IV	22/39, 196 yards, 1 TD, 1 INT
Georgia State	Rushing	Destin Coates	34 carries, 150 yards, 1 TD
Georgia State	Receiving	Roger Carter	2 receptions, 53 yards, 1 TD

=== Georgia Southern ===
Georgia Southern at Louisiana

Team	1	2	3	4	Total
Eagles	0	7	3	8	18
• No. 19 Ragin' Cajuns	0	7	3	10	20

- Date: September 26, 2020
- Location: Cajun Field
  Lafayette, LA
- Game start: 11:01 a.m. CDT
- Elapsed time: 3 hours and 19 minutes
- Game attendance: 5,585
- Game weather: 79 °F (26 °C) • Weather: Sunny, Humid • Wind: Calm
- Referee: Wayne Winkler
- TV announcers (ESPN2): Beth Mowins (play–by–play), Kirk Morrison (analyst), and Dawn Davenport (sideline reporter)

Scoring summary
2	14:53	GASO	J. D. King 2-yard rush (Alex Raynor kick) (5 plays, 85 yards, 2:49)	GASO 7–0
2	09:25	LA	Trey Ragas 10-yard rush (Nate Snyder kick) (9 plays, 83 yards, 5:22)	TIE 7–7
3	05:49	GASO	Alex Raynor 27-yard field goal (13 plays, 66 yards, 7:34)	GASO 10–7
3	00:30	LA	Nate Snyder 25-yard field goal (12 plays, 67 yards, 5:19)	TIE 10–10
4	10:34	LA	Errol Rogers Jr. 27-yard pass from Levi Lewis (Nate Snyder kick) (5 plays, 58 yards, 2:46)	LA 17–10
4	00:54	GASO	Khaleb Hood 28-yard pass from Shai Werts (Shai Werts two-point conversion pass to Darion Anderson) (5 plays, 61 yards, 0:40)	GASO 18–17
4	00:00	LA	Nate Snyder 53-yard field goal (7 plays, 39 yards, 0:54)	LA 20–18

Statistics	Georgia Southern	Louisiana
First downs	21	18
Total yards	447	438
Rushing yards	192	148
Passing yards	255	290
Turnovers	2	1
Time of possession	35:14	24:46

Team	Category	Player	Statistics
Georgia Southern	Passing	Shai Werts	11/18, 255 yards, 1 TD, 1 INT
Georgia Southern	Rushing	J. D. King	24 carries, 100 yards, 1 TD
Georgia Southern	Receiving	Wesley Kennedy III	2 receptions, 105 yards
Louisiana	Passing	Levi Lewis	18/32, 290 yards, 1 TD, 1 INT
Louisiana	Rushing	Chris Smith	4 carries, 54 yards
Louisiana	Receiving	Peter LeBlanc	3 receptions, 64 yards

=== Coastal Carolina ===
Coastal Carolina at Louisiana

Team	1	2	3	4	Total
• Chanticleers	7	6	7	10	30
No. 21 Ragin' Cajuns	7	6	7	7	27

- Date: October 14, 2020
- Location: Cajun Field
  Lafayette, LA
- Game start: 6:35 p.m. CDT
- Elapsed time: 3 hours and 21 minutes
- Game attendance: 5,585
- Game weather: 81 °F (27 °C) • Weather: Clear • Wind: SSW 4 MPH
- Referee: Jeremy Parker
- TV announcers (ESPN): Chris Cotter (play–by–play), Eric MacLain (analyst), Lericia Harris (sideline reporter)

Scoring summary
1	10:04	LA	Jalen Williams 12-yard pass from Levi Lewis (Nate Snyder kick) (10 plays, 75 yards, 4:56)	LA 7–0
1	04:49	CCU	C; J. Marable 1-yard rush (Massimo Biscardi kick) (10 plays, 75 yards, 5:15)	TIE 7–7
2	04:28	CCU	C. J. Marable 13-yard pass from Grayson McCall (Massimo Biscardi PAT failed) (7 plays, 84 yards, 3:39)	CCU 13–7
2	00:05	LA	Levi Lewis 8-yard rush (Nate Snyder PAT failed) (9 plays, 77 yards, 0:58)	TIE 13–13
3	06:48	CCU	Jaivon Heiligh 6-yard pass from Grayson McCall (Massimo Biscardi kick) (16 plays, 75 yards, 8:12)	CCU 20–13
3	03:47	CCU	Elijah Mitchell 9-yard rush (Nate Snyder kick) (7 plays, 66 yards, 3:01)	TIE 20–20
4	14:12	CCU	Grayson McCall 3-yard rush (Massimo Biscardi kick); 3 plays, 26 yards, 0:55)	CCU 27–20
4	12:44	LA	Elijah Mitchell 1-yard rush (Nate Snyder kick) (4 plays, 55 yards, 1:28)	TIE 27–27
4	00:04	CCU	Massimo Biscardi 40-yard field goal (11 plays, 61 yards, 5:26)	CCU 30–27

Statistics	Coastal Carolina	Louisiana
First downs	23	19
Total yards	414	413
Rushing yards	212	240
Passing yards	202	173
Turnovers	0	1
Time of possession	38:11	21:49

Team	Category	Player	Statistics
Coastal Carolina	Passing	Grayson McCall	17/24, 202 yards, 2 TDs
Coastal Carolina	Rushing	C. J. Marable	17 carries, 73 yards, 1 TD
Coastal Carolina	Receiving	Jaivon Heiligh	8 receptions, 108 yards, 1 TD
Louisiana	Passing	Levi Lewis	14/24, 173 yards, 1 TD, 1 INT
Louisiana	Rushing	Levi Lewis	6 carries, 84 yards, 1 TD
Louisiana	Receiving	Jalen Williams	4 receptions, 89 yards, 1 TD

=== At UAB ===
Louisiana at Alabama–Birmingham

Team	1	2	3	4	Total
• RV Ragin' Cajuns	0	10	7	7	24
RV Blazers	3	10	7	0	20

- Date: October 23, 2020
- Location: Legion Field
  Birmingham, AL
- Game start: 7:02 p.m. CDT
- Elapsed time: 3 hours and 29 minutes
- Game attendance: 11,610
- Referee: Kevin Randall
- TV announcers (CBS Sports Network): Dave Ryan (play–by–play), Corey Chavous (analyst), and A. J. Ross (sideline reporter)

Scoring summary
1	01:54	UAB	Matt Quinn 33-yard field goal (12 plays, 47 yards, 4:54)	UAB 3–0
2	13:27	LA	Nate Snyder 21-yard field goal (11 plays, 72 yards, 3:21)	TIE 3–3
2	09:36	UAB	Matt Quinn 25-yard field goal (9 plays, 58 yards, 3:51)	UAB 6–3
2	00:34	UAB	Spencer Brown 1-yard rush (Matt Quinn kick) (11 plays, 41 yards, 5:28)	UAB 13–3
2	00:19	LA	Chris Smith 100-yard kickoff returned (Nate Snyder kick) (0 plays, 0 yards, 0:00)	UAB 13–10
3	03:40	UAB	Spencer Brown 1-yard rush (Matt Quinn kick) (13 plays, 58 yards, 7:45)	UAB 20–10
3	00:20	LA	Jalen Williams 23-yard pass from Levi Lewis (Nate Snyder kick) (8 plays, 78 yards, 3:12)	UAB 20–17
4	06:35	LA	Pearse Migl 9-yard pass from Levi Lewis (Nate Snyder kick) (14 plays, 86 yards, 6:40)	LA 24–20

Statistics	Louisiana	UAB
First downs	17	17
Total yards	286	285
Rushing yards	134	175
Passing yards	152	110
Turnovers	0	2
Time of possession	30:37	29:23

Team	Category	Player	Statistics
Louisiana	Passing	Levi Lewis	12/20, 152 yards, 2 TDS
Louisiana	Rushing	Elijah Mitchell	21 carries, 67 yards
Louisiana	Receiving	Kyren Lacy	2 receptions, 43 yards
UAB	Passing	Bryson Lucero	10/23, 110 yards, 2 INTs
UAB	Rushing	Spencer Brown	28 carries, 128 yards, 2 TDs
UAB	Receiving	Ryan Davis	2 receptions, 34 yards

=== At Texas State ===
Louisiana at Texas State

Team	1	2	3	4	Total
• RV Ragin' Cajuns	14	20	3	7	44
Bobcats	14	7	6	7	34

- Date: October 31, 2020
- Location: Bobcat Stadium
  San Marcos, TX
- Game start: 7:02 p.m. CDT
- Elapsed time: 3 hours and 33 minutes
- Game attendance: 7,500
- Game weather: 69 °F (21 °C) • Weather: Clear Skies • Wind: S 6 MPH
- Referee: Marshall Lewis
- TV announcers (ESPNU): Mike Couzens (play–by–play) and Rene Ingoglia (analyst)

Scoring summary
1	11:54	LA	Trey Ragas 3-yard rush (Nate Snyder kick) (5 plays, 47 yards, 2:01)	LA 7–0
1	10:54	LA	Calif Gossett 46-yard pass from Levi Lewis (Nate Snyder kick) (1 play, 46 yards, 2:01)	LA 14–0
1	07:20	TXST	Seth Keller 12-yard rush (Seth Keller kick) (9 plays, 84 yards, 3:28)	LA 14–7
1	00:42	TXST	Jahmyl Jeter 1-yard rush (Seth Keller kick) (5 plays, 35 yards, 1:30)	TIE 14–14
2	11:40	TXST	Marcell Barbee 33-yard pass from Brady McBride (Seth Keller kick) (5 plays, 74 yards, 2:00)	TXST 21–14
2	07:21	LA	Levi Lewis 12-yard rush (Nate Snyder kick); 10 plays, 75 yards, 4:19)	TIE 21–21
2	01:23	LA	Trey Ragas 2-yard rush (Nate Snyder kick) (6 plays, 64 yards, 1:03)	LA 28–21
2	00:07	LA	Kyren Lacy 1-yard pass from Levi Lewis (Nate Snyder PAT failed) (7 plays, 62 yards, 0:47)	LA 34–21
3	13:33	LA	Nate Snyder 42-yard field goal (5 plays, 52 yards, 1:27)	LA 37–21
3	03:26	TXST	Brock Sturges 10-yard rush (two-point pass conversion attempt failed) (7 plays, 62 yards, 2:01)	LA 37–27
4	10:15	LA	Trey Ragas 7-yard rush (Nate Snyder kick) (10 plays, 56 yards, 4:49)	LA 44–27
4	01:50	LA	Brock Sturges 18-yard rush (Seth Keller kick) (7 plays, 60 yards, 2:35)	LA 44–34

Statistics	Louisiana	Texas State
First downs	31	26
Total yards	614	382
Rushing yards	282	204
Passing yards	332	178
Turnovers	4	3
Time of possession	33:06	26:54

Team	Category	Player	Statistics
Louisiana	Passing	Levi Lewis	22/32, 332 yards, 2 TDs, 1 INT
Louisiana	Rushing	Trey Ragas	19 carries, 131 yards, 3 TDs
Louisiana	Receiving	Jalen Williams	3 receptions, 85 yards
Texas State	Passing	Brady McBride	14/32, 166 yards, 1 TD, 3 TDs
Texas State	Rushing	Brock Sturges	17 carries, 128 yards, 2 TDs
Texas State	Receiving	Marcell Barbee	2 receptions, 62 yards, 1 TD

=== Arkansas State ===
Arkansas State at Louisiana

Team	1	2	3	4	Total
Red Wolves	3	3	0	14	20
• RV Ragin' Cajuns	0	0	14	13	27

- Date: November 7, 2020
- Location: Cajun Field
  Lafayette, LA
- Game start: 11:02 a.m. CST
- Elapsed time: 3 hours and 22 minutes
- Game attendance: 5,585
- Game weather: 76 °F (24 °C) • Weather: Mostly Cloudy • Wind: ENE 6 MPH
- Referee: Kyle Olson
- TV announcers (ESPNU): Dave Neal (play–by–play) and DJ Shockley (analyst)

Scoring summary
1	00:27	ARST	Blake Grupe 24-yard field goal (11 plays, 39 yards, 4:32)	ARST 3–0
2	06:37	ARST	Blake Grupe 35-yard field goal (11 plays, 33 yards, 4:15)	ARST 6–0
3	13:38	LA	Levi Lewis 33-yard rush (Nate Snyder kick) (4 plays, 63 yards, 1:22)	LA 7–6
3	05:56	LA	Dontae Fleming 52-yard pass from Levi Lewis (Nate Snyder kick) (2 plays, 74 yards, 0:54)	LA 14–6
4	10:37	ARST	Jamal Jones 4-yard rush (two-point conversion pass attempt failed) (11 plays, 80 yards, 4:19)	LA 14–12
4	13:38	LA	Kenneth Almendares 35-yard field goal (6 plays, 51 yards, 2:09)	LA 17–12
4	03:59	LA	Kenneth Almendares 43-yard field goal (5 plays, 23 yards, 2:07)	LA 20–12
4	02:24	ARST	Brandon Bowling 47-yard pass from Layne Hatcher (Layne Hatcher two-point conversion pass to Jonathan Adams Jr.) (4 plays, 91 yards, 1:25)	TIE 20–20
4	01:13	LA	Elijah Mitchell 2-yard rush (Kenneth Almendares kick) (6 plays, 61 yards, 1:07)	LA 27–20

Statistics	Arkansas State	Louisiana
First downs	24	19
Total yards	423	440
Rushing yards	199	196
Passing yards	224	244
Turnovers	2	1
Time of possession	31:45	28:15

Team	Category	Player	Statistics
Arkansas State	Passing	Logan Bonner	16/30, 127 yards, 2 INTs
Arkansas State	Rushing	Lincoln Pare	22 carries, 121 yards
Arkansas State	Receiving	Jonathan Adams Jr.	8 receptions, 95 yards
Louisiana	Passing	Levi Lewis	17/29, 244 yards, 1 TD, 1 INT
Louisiana	Rushing	Elijah Mitchell	16 carries, 90 yards, 1 TD
Louisiana	Receiving	Neal Johnson	5 receptions, 68 yards

=== South Alabama ===
South Alabama at Louisiana

Team	1	2	3	4	Total
Jaguars	3	7	0	0	10
• No. 25 Ragin' Cajuns	14	14	3	7	38

- Date: November 14, 2020
- Location: Cajun Field
  Lafayette, LA
- Game start: 1:06 p.m. CST
- Elapsed time: 3 hours and 9 minutes
- Game attendance: 5,585
- Game weather: 79 °F (26 °C) • Weather: Mostly Cloudy • Wind: S 10 MPH
- Referee: Jeremy Parker
- TV announcers (ESPN+): Dan McDonald (play–by–play) and Chris Lanaux (analyst)

Scoring summary
1	10:25	LA	Jalen Williams 5-yard pass from Levi Lewis (Kenneth Almendares kick) (9 plays, 57 yards, 3:07)	LA 7–0
1	08:28	LA	Chris Smith 22-yard rush (Kenneth Almendares kick) (3 plays, 26 yards, 0:49)	LA 14–0
1	01:05	USA	Diego Guajardo 26-yard field goal (15 plays, 52 yards, 7:14)	LA 14–3
2	07:54	LA	Errol Rogers Jr. 3-yard pass from Levi Lewis (Kenneth Almendares kick) (11 plays, 75 yards, 5:05)	LA 21–3
2	04:04	USA	Kawaan Baker 7-yard pass from Desmond Trotter (Diego Guajardo kick) (10 plays, 75 yards, 3:50)	LA 21–10
2	01:55	LA	Elijah Mitchell 5-yard rush (Kenneth Almendares kick) (6 plays, 78 yards, 2:04)	LA 28–10
3	02:32	LA	Kenneth Almendares 25-yard field goal (7 plays, 82 yards, 3:54)	LA 31–10
4	10:59	LA	Trey Ragas 25-yard pass from Levi Lewis (Kenneth Almendares kick) (10 plays, 80 yards, 4:16)	LA 38–10

Statistics	South Alabama	Louisiana
First downs	19	23
Total yards	268	506
Rushing yards	123	254
Passing yards	145	252
Turnovers	2	2
Time of possession	31:47	28:13

Team	Category	Player	Statistics
South Alabama	Passing	Desmond Trotter	15/28, 133 yards, 1 TD, 1 INT
South Alabama	Rushing	Terrion Avery	14 carries, 62 yards
South Alabama	Receiving	Jalen Tolbert	5 receptions, 64 yards
Louisiana	Passing	Levi Lewis	21/31, 252 yards, 3 TDs, 1 INT
Louisiana	Rushing	Chris Smith	7 carries, 99 yards, 1 TD
Louisiana	Receiving	Neal Johnson	3 receptions, 40 yards

=== At Louisiana–Monroe ===
Louisiana at Louisiana–Monroe

Team	1	2	3	4	Total
• Ragin' Cajuns	21	28	7	14	70
Warhawks	14	0	0	6	20

- Date: November 28, 2020
- Location: Malone Stadium
  Monroe, LA
- Game start: 2:05 p.m. CST
- Elapsed time: 3 hours and 13 minutes
- Game attendance: 3,132
- Game weather: 53 °F (12 °C) • Weather: Cloudy • Wind: NE 11 MPH
- Referee: Kyle Olson
- TV announcers (ESPN3): Chris Harris (play–by–play) and Mike Hammett (analyst)

Scoring summary
1	11:26	LA	Trey Ragas 11-yard rush (Kenneth Almendares kick) (3 plays, 38 yards, 1:32)	LA 7–0
1	06:36	LA	Levi Lewis 11-yard rush (Kenneth Almendares kick) (7 plays, 33 yards, 3:25)	LA 14–0
1	04:18	ULM	Cameron Darling 1-yard pass from Jeremy Hunt (Zach Elder kick) (2 plays, 1 yards, 0:39)	LA 14–7
1	01:53	LA	Elijah Mitchell 44-yard rush (Kenneth Almendares kick) (6 plays, 70 yards, 2:25)	LA 21–7
1	00:07	ULM	Jeremy Hunt 7-yard rush (Zach Elder kick) (4 plays, 78 yards, 1:46)	LA 21–14
2	11:50	LA	Neal Johnson 1-yard pass from Levi Lewis (Kenneth Almendares kick) (7 plays, 73 yards, 3:17)	LA 28–14
2	07:11	LA	Levi Lewis 7-yard rush (Kenneth Almendares kick) (9 plays, 60 yards, 3:38)	LA 35–14
2	05:02	LA	Bralen Trahan 53-yard interception returned (Kenneth Almendares kick) (6 plays, 8 yards, 2:09)	LA 42–14
2	00:17	LA	Kyren Lacy 22-yard pass from Levi Lewis (Kenneth Almendares kick) (11 plays, 86 yards, 2:34)	LA 49–14
3	10:38	LA	Johnny Lumpkin 1-yard pass from Levi Lewis (Kenneth Almendares kick); 6 plays, 43 yards, 2:45)	LA 56–14
4	14:54	ULM	Zach Rasmussen 0-yard fumble returned (Zach Elder PAT failed) (9 plays, 48 yards, 2:53)	LA 56–20
4	06:33	LA	Michael Orphey Jr. 48-yard rush (Kenneth Almendares kick) (7 plays, 77 yards, 4:29)	LA 63–20
4	03:23	LA	Kaleb Carter 13-yard pass from Jai'ave Magalei (Nate Snyder kick) (3 plays, 16 yards, 1:32)	LA 70–20

Statistics	Louisiana	Louisiana–Monroe
First downs	26	14
Total yards	511	247
Rushing yards	344	125
Passing yards	167	122
Turnovers	1	3
Time of possession	31:54	28:06

Team	Category	Player	Statistics
Louisiana	Passing	Levi Lewis	18/25, 147 yards, 3 TDs
Louisiana	Rushing	Trey Ragas	11 carries, 95 yards, 1 TD
Louisiana	Receiving	Kyren Lacy	5 receptions, 48 yards, 1 TD
Louisiana–Monroe	Passing	Jeremy Hunt	14/32, 121 yards, 1 TD, 1 INT
Louisiana–Monroe	Rushing	Kadyn Roach	7 carries, 65 yards
Louisiana–Monroe	Receiving	Jonathan Hodoh	1 reception, 43 yards

=== At Appalachian State ===
Louisiana at Appalachian State

Team	1	2	3	4	Total
• No. 25 Ragin' Cajuns	0	9	15	0	24
Mountaineers	7	3	0	11	21

- Date: December 4, 2020
- Location: Kidd Brewer Stadium
  Boone, NC
- Game start: 7:40 p.m. CST
- Elapsed time: 3 hours and 22 minutes
- Game attendance: 2,170
- Game weather: 42 °F (6 °C) • Weather: Rainy and Wet • Wind: Light
- Referee: Wayne Winkler
- TV announcers (ESPN): Jason Benetti (play–by–play), Andre Ware (analyst), and Marty Smith (sideline reporter)

Scoring summary
1	06:50	APST	Nate Noel 33-yard rush (Chandler Staton kick) (8 plays, 50 yards, 3:34)	APST 7–0
2	06:25	LA	Trey Ragas 8-yard pass from Levi Lewis (two-point pass conversion attempt failed) (6 plays, 49 yards, 3:14)	APST 7–6
2	00:26	APST	Chandler Staton 43-yard field goal (8 plays, 23 yards, 2:25)	APST 10–6
2	00:00	LA	Kenneth Almendares 26-yard field goal (6 plays, 46 yards, 0:26)	APST 10–9
3	07:52	LA	Trey Ragas 17-yard rush (Levi Lewis two-point conversion rush) (9 plays, 52 yards, 3:45)	LA 17–10
3	00:29	LA	Trey Ragas 1-yard rush (Kenneth Almendares kick) (10 plays, 74 yards, 5:43)	LA 24–10
4	08:17	APST	Camerun Peoples 1-yard rush (Chandler Staton kick) (14 plays, 80 yards, 7:12)	LA 24–17
4	06:36	APST	Team Safety (4 plays, -26 yards, 1:41)	LA 24–19
4	01:46	APST	Team Safety (4 plays, -27 yards, 0:23)	LA 24–21

Statistics	Louisiana	Appalachian State
First downs	18	19
Total yards	227	290
Rushing yards	126	198
Passing yards	101	92
Turnovers	0	3
Time of possession	24:17	35:43

Team	Category	Player	Statistics
Louisiana	Passing	Levi Lewis	8/23, 101 yards, 1 TD
Louisiana	Rushing	Elijah Mitchell	12 carries, 95 yards
Louisiana	Receiving	Jalen Williams	2 receptions, 39 yards
Appalachain State	Passing	Zac Thomas	10/21, 92 yards, 2 INTs
Appalachain State	Rushing	Camerun Peoples	21 carries, 99 yards, 1 TD
Appalachain State	Receiving	Thomas Hennigan	4 receptions, 44 yards

=== Vs. UTSA (first responder bowl) ===
Texas–San Antonio vs. Louisiana

Team	1	2	3	4	Total
Roadrunners	0	7	14	3	24
• No. 19 Ragin' Cajuns	7	10	7	7	31

- Date: December 26, 2020
- Location: Gerald J. Ford Stadium
  University Park, TX
- Game start: 2:36 p.m. CST
- Elapsed time: 3 hours and 19 minutes
- Game attendance: 3,512
- Game weather: 70 °F (21 °C) • Weather: Sunny • Wind: S 15 MPH
- Referee: Riley Johnson
- TV announcers (ABC): Anish Shroff (play–by–play), Tom Luginbill (analyst), and Quint Kessenich (sideline reporter)

Scoring summary
1	10:43	LA	Jalen Williams 15-yard pass from Levi Lewis (Kenneth Almendares kick) (8 plays, 68 yards, 4:17)	LA 7–0
2	08:27	LA	Kenneth Almendares 31-yard field goal (11 plays, 61 yards, 4:35)	LA 10–0
2	04:33	UTSA	Frank Harris 11-yard rush (Hunter Duplessis kick) (9 plays, 75 yards, 3:54)	LA 10–7
2	01:21	LA	Kyren Lacy 10-yard pass from Levi Lewis (Kenneth Almendares kick) (8 plays, 74 yards, 3:12)	LA 17–7
3	14:19	LA	Elijah Mitchell 3-yard rush (Kenneth Almendares kick) (1 play, 3 yards, 0:04)	LA 24–7
3	10:14	UTSA	Zakhari Franklin 29-yard pass from Frank Harris (Hunter Duplessis kick) (4 plays, 62 yards, 1:00)	LA 24–14
3	04:09	UTSA	Joshua Cephus 10-yard pass from Frank Harris (Hunter Duplessis kick) (6 plays, 89 yards, 2:24)	LA 24–21
4	13:32	UTSA	Hunter Duplessis 20-yard field goal (9 plays, 82 yards, 3:33)	TIE 24–24
4	07:16	LA	Trey Ragas 1-yard rush (Kenneth Almendares kick) (12 plays, 72 yards, 6:16)	LA 31–24

Statistics	UTSA	Louisiana
First downs	27	23
Total yards	431	411
Rushing yards	223	223
Passing yards	208	208
Turnovers	2	1
Time of possession	27:23	32:37

Team	Category	Player	Statistics
UTSA	Passing	Frank Harris	13/21, 208 yards, 2 TDs, 1 INT
UTSA	Rushing	Sincere McCormick	23 carries, 122 yards
UTSA	Receiving	Zakhari Franklin	5 receptions, 115 yards, 1 TD
Louisiana	Passing	Levi Lewis	12/22, 146 yards, 2 TDs
Louisiana	Rushing	Elijah Mitchell	19 carries, 127 yards, 1 TD
Louisiana	Receiving	Elijah Mitchell	2 receptions, 45 yards

== Postseason Accolade ==
Accolade	Recipient
2021 Reese's Senior Bowl participant	Elijah Mitchell, RB
2021 East-West Shrine Game participant	Trey Ragas, RB
Davy O'Brien Award Great 8	Levi Lewis, QB
Davy O'Brien Quarterback Class of 2020	Levi Lewis, QB
AFCA 35 under 35 coaches Leadership Institute	Robby Discher
Burlsworth Trophy nominee	Shane Vallot, OL
Broyles Award nominee	Patrick Toney
Joe Moore Award semifinalist	Louisiana OL
All-Sun Belt First Team Offense	Elijah Mitchell, RB
All-Sun Belt First Team Specialists	Chris Smith, RS
All-Sun Belt Second Team Offense	Levi Lewis, QB; Trey Ragas, RB; O'Cyrus Torrence, OL; Max Mitchell, OL
All-Sun Belt Second Team Defense	Zi'Yon Hill, DL; Bralen Trahan, DB
All-Sun Belt Second Team Specialists	Rhys Burns, P
All-Sun Belt Third Team Offense	Ken Marks, OL; Shane Vallot, OL
All-Sun Belt Third Team Defense	Lorenzo McCaskill, LB; Eric Garror, DB
All-Sun Belt Third Team Specialists	Chris Smith, AP
All-Sun Belt Honorable Mentioned	Ferrod Gardner, OL; Tayland Humphrey, DL; Mekhi Garner, CB; Percy Butler, S
Pro Focus Football First Team All-American	Chris Smith, RS
Pro Focus Football Third Team All-American	Bralen Trahan, S
Pro Focus Football Honorable Mentioned All-American	Zi'Yon Hill, DL
Pro Focus Football First Team All-Sun Belt	Trey Ragas, RB; Max Mitchell, OL; Zi'Yon Hill, DL; Bralen Trahan, S Chris Smith, RS
Pro Focus Football Second Team All-Sun Belt	Eric Garror, CB; Mekhi Garner, CB; Cameron Soloman, S Percy Butler, S
Pro Focus Football Third Team All-Sun Belt	Levi Lewis, QB; Elijah Mitchell, RB; O'Cyrus Torrence, OL; Carlos Rubio, OL
Pro Focus Football Honorable Mentioned All-Sun Belt	Shane Vallot, OL; Tayland Humphrey, DL; AJ Washington, CB
CBS Sports First Team All-American	Chris Smith, RS
247Sports First Team All-American	Chris Smith, RS
FWAA Second Team All-American	Chris Smith, RS
FootballScoop offensive line coaches of the Year	Rob Sale; D. J. Looney

== Rankings ==
Ranking movements Legend: ██ Increase in ranking ██ Decrease in ranking — = Not ranked RV = Received votes
	Week																		
Poll	Pre	1	2	3	4	5	6	7	8	9	10	11	12	13	14	15	16	17	Final
AP	—	—*	RV	19	19	RV	23	21	RV	RV	RV	25	24	23	20	17	17	17	15
Coaches	RV	RV*	RV	21	25	RV	23	21	RV	RV	RV	RV	25	24	21	17	18	18	16
CFP	Not released													—	25	19	19	19	Not released

== Players drafted into the NFL ==
Round	Pick	Player	Position	NFL Club
6	194	Elijah Mitchell	RB	San Francisco 49ers

== Notes ==
1. Many games during the 2020 season denoted “0” in attendance due to COVID-19 pandemic regulations. See Impacts of the COVID-19 pandemic.
