= 2020 South Alabama Jaguars football team =

American college football season

2020 South Alabama Jaguars football
- Conference: Sun Belt Conference
- West Division
- Record: 4–7 (3–5 Sun Belt)
- Head coach: Steve Campbell (3rd season)
- Offensive coordinator: Kenny Edenfield (3rd season)
- Offensive scheme: Spread
- Defensive coordinator: Greg Stewart (3rd season)
- Base defense: 4–3
- Home stadium: Hancock Whitney Stadium

2020 Sun Belt Conference football standings
	Conf.			Overall
Team	W		L	W		L
East Division
No. 14 Coastal Carolina xy+	8	–	0	11	–	1
Appalachian State	6	–	2	9	–	3
Georgia Southern	4	–	4	8	–	5
Georgia State	4	–	4	6	–	4
Troy	3	–	4	5	–	6
West Division
No. 15 Louisiana xy+	7	–	1	10	–	1
South Alabama	3	–	5	4	–	7
Arkansas State	2	–	6	4	–	7
Texas State	2	–	6	2	–	10
Louisiana–Monroe	0	–	7	0	–	10
Championship: Louisiana at Coastal Carolina (Canceled)
+ – Conference co-champions; x – Division champion/co-champions; y – Championship game participant; Rankings from AP Poll

The 2020 South Alabama Jaguars football team represented the University of South Alabama in the 2020 NCAA Division I FBS football season. The Jaguars played their home games at Hancock Whitney Stadium in Mobile, Alabama, and competed in the West Division of the Sun Belt Conference. They were led by third-year head coach Steve Campbell.

This was the team's first season at Hancock Whitney Stadium, after competing for 10 years at Ladd–Peebles Stadium. After the team completed their season with a 4–7 record (3–5 in conference play), Campbell was fired on December 6, 2020.

== Schedule ==
South Alabama had games scheduled against Florida and Grambling State, but were canceled due to the COVID-19 pandemic.

Date	Time	Opponent	Site	TV	Result	Attendance
September 3	8:00 p.m.	at Southern Miss*	M. M. Roberts Stadium; Hattiesburg, MS	CBSSN	W 32–21	7,500
September 12	6:30 p.m.	Tulane*	Hancock Whitney Stadium; Mobile, AL	ESPN2	L 24–27	6,000
September 24	6:30 p.m.	UAB*	Hancock Whitney Stadium; Mobile, AL	ESPN	L 10–42	5,766
October 17	11:00 a.m.	Texas State^{†}	Hancock Whitney Stadium; Mobile, AL	ESPNU	W 30–20	5,142
October 24	6:00 p.m.	Louisiana–Monroe	Hancock Whitney Stadium; Mobile, AL	ESPN+	W 38–14	5,186
October 29	6:30 p.m.	at Georgia Southern	Paulson Stadium; Statesboro, GA	ESPN	L 17–24	3,457
November 7	7:00 p.m.	at No. 15 Coastal Carolina	Brooks Stadium; Conway, SC	ESPNU	L 6–23	5,000
November 14	1:00 p.m.	at No. 25 Louisiana	Cajun Field; Lafayette, LA	ESPN+	L 10–38	5,585
November 21	3:00 p.m.	Georgia State	Hancock Whitney Stadium; Mobile, AL	ESPNU	L 14–31	5,224
November 28	2:00 p.m.	at Arkansas State	Centennial Bank Stadium; Jonesboro, AR	ESPN3	W 38–31	4,013
December 5	1:00 p.m.	Troy	Hancock Whitney Stadium; Mobile, AL (rivalry)	ESPN3	L 0–29	5,375
*Non-conference game; ^{†}Homecoming; Rankings from AP Poll and CFP Rankings after November 24 released prior to game; All times are in Central time

== Game summaries ==
=== At Southern Miss ===
South Alabama at Southern Mississippi

Team	1	2	3	4	Total
• Jaguars	13	0	10	6	29
Golden Eagles	0	10	3	8	21

- Date: September 3, 2020
- Location: M. M. Roberts Stadium
  Hattiesburg, MS
- Game start: 8:00 p.m. CDT
- Elapsed time: 3 hours and 39 minutes
- Game attendance: 7,500
- Game weather: 83 °F (28 °C) • Weather: clear • Wind: SW 5 MPH
- Referee: Wayne Winkler
- TV announcers (CBS Sports Network): Carter Blackburn (play-by-play), Aaron Taylor (analyst)

Scoring summary
1	13:57	USA	Jalen Tolbert 73 yard pass from Desmond Trotter (Tanner McGee 2-pt. pass failed) (3 plays, 75 yards, 1:03)	USA 6–0
1	01:30	USA	Terrion Avery 2 yard rush (Diego Guajardo kick) (9 plays, 99 yards, 3:47)	USA 13–0
2	10:27	USM	Don Ragsdale 2 yard rush (Briggs Bourgeois kick) (8 plays, 79 yards, 3:48)	USA 13–7
2	00:14	USM	Briggs Bourgeois 26 yard field goal (13 plays, 64 yards, 5:10)	USA 13–10
3	10:23	USA	Jalen Tolbert 31 yard pass from Desmond Trotter (Diego Guajardo kick) (10 plays, 56 yards, 3:37)	USA 20–10
3	06:56	USM	Briggs Bourgeois 28 yard field goal (10 plays, 55 yards, 3:27)	USA 20–13
3	02:15	USA	Diego Guajardo 21 yard field goal (12 plays, 85 yards, 4:41)	USA 23–13
4	10:20	USA	Kawaan Baker 52 yard pass from Chance Lovertich (Diego Guajardo kick failed) (7 plays, 80 yards, 3:48)	USA 29–13
4	05:42	USM	Naricuss Driver 1 yard rush (Luke Baker 2-pt. pass good) (11 plays, 75 yards, 4:38)	USA 29–21
4	01:40	USA	Diego Guajardo 34-yard field goal (8 plays, 59 yards, 4:02)	USA 32–21

Statistics	South Alabama	Southern Miss
First downs	23	20
Total yards	529	409
Rushing yards	166	95
Passing yards	363	314
Turnovers	2	0
Time of possession	29:08	30:52

Team	Category	Player	Statistics
South Alabama	Passing	Desmond Trotter	16/27, 299 yards, 2 TD, 2 INT
South Alabama	Rushing	Carlos Davis	15 carries, 85 yards
South Alabama	Receiving	Jalen Tolbert	6 yards, 169 yards, 2 TD
Southern Miss	Passing	Jack Abraham	22/32, 314 yards
Southern Miss	Rushing	Frank Gore Jr.	12 carries, 32 yards
Southern Miss	Receiving	Tim Jones	6 receptions, 139 yards

=== Tulane ===
Tulane at South Alabama

Team	1	2	3	4	Total
• Green Wave	0	6	7	14	27
Jaguars	0	14	10	0	24

- Date: September 12, 2020
- Location: Hancock Whitney Stadium
  Mobile, AL
- Game start: 6:30 p.m. CDT
- Elapsed time: 3 hours and 36 minutes
- Game attendance: 6,000
- Game weather: 85 °F (29 °C) • Weather: Parly Cloudy • Wind: 0 MPH
- Referee: Marshall Lewis
- TV announcers (ESPN2): Mike Couzens (play-by-play), Dustin Fox (analyst), Lauren Sisler (sideline reporter)

Scoring summary
2	10:51	USA	Kawaan Baker 34-yard pass from Chance Lovertich (Diego Guajardo kick) (9 plays, 80 yards, 2:46)	USA 7–0
2	09:27	TULN	Cameron Carroll 6-yard rush (Merek Glover PAT failed) (4 plays, 75 yards, 1:24)	USA 7–6
2	06:46	USA	Jalen Wayne 13-yard pass from Chance Lovertich (Diego Guajardo kick) (5 plays, 75 yards, 2:41)	USA 14–6
3	12:15	USA	Carlos Davis 2-yard rush (Diego Guajardo kick) (6 plays, 75 yards, 2:45)	USA 21–6
3	07:38	USA	Diego Guajardo 49-yard field goal (7 plays, 24 yards, 2:54)	USA 24–6
3	05:07	TULN	Cameron Carroll 12-yard rush (Merek Glover kick) (6 plays, 60 yards, 2:31)	USA 24–13
4	14:42	TULN	Keon Howard 1-yard rush (two-point conversion rush attempt failed) (5 plays, 42 yards, 1:48)	USA 24–19
4	03:18	TULN	Amare Jones 16-yard rush (Keon Howard two-point conversion pass to Tyrick James) (6 plays, 67 yards, 1:48)	TULN 27–24

Statistics	Tulane	South Alabama
First downs	22	20
Total yards	394	401
Rushing yards	204	78
Passing yards	190	323
Turnovers	1	1
Time of possession	26:02	33:58

Team	Category	Player	Statistics
Tulane	Passing	Keon Howard	14/30, 190 yards
Tulane	Rushing	Tyjae Spears	11 carries, 106 yards
Tulane	Receiving	Jha'Quan Jackson	3 receptions, 44 yards
South Alabama	Passing	Chase Lovertich	18/30, 249 yards, 2 TDs
South Alabama	Rushing	Carlos Davis	17 carries, 89 yards, 1 TD
South Alabama	Receiving	Kawaan Baker	7 receptions, 129 yards, 1 TD

=== UAB ===
Alabama–Birmingham at South Alabama

Team	1	2	3	4	Total
• Blazers	14	14	0	14	42
Jaguars	0	10	0	0	10

- Date: September 24, 2020
- Location: Hancock Whitney Stadium
  Mobile, AL
- Game start: 6:35 p.m. CDT
- Elapsed time: 3 hours and 25 minutes
- Game attendance: 5,766
- Game weather: 77 °F (25 °C) • Weather: Cloudy • Wind: 4 SW MPH
- Referee: Kyle Olson
- TV announcers (ESPN): Matt Barrie (play–by–play), Mike Golic Jr. (analyst), and Lauren Sisler (sideline reporter)

Scoring summary
1	13:14	UAB	Spencer Brown 15-yard rush (Matthew Quinn kick) (4 plays, 80 yards, 1:46)	UAB 7–0
1	05:26	UAB	Spencer Brown 1-yard rush (Matthew Quinn kick) (12 plays, 76 yards, 5:51)	UAB 14–0
2	14:30	USA	Jalen Talbot 38-yard pass from Chance Lovertich (Diego Guajardo kick) (5 plays, 70 yards, 1:18)	UAB 14–7
2	12:57	USA	Deigo Guajardo 31-yard field goal (5 plays, 28 yards, 1:36)	UAB 14–10
2	10:20	UAB	Spencer Brown 20-yard rush (Matthew Quinn kick) (7 plays, 75 yards, 2:37)	UAB 21–10
2	03:20	UAB	Trea Shropshire 6-yard pass from Bryson Lucero (Matthew Quinn kick) (6 plays, 71 yards, 2:19)	UAB 28–10
4	07:15	UAB	Austin Watkins 15-yard pass from Bryson Lucero (Matthew Quinn kick) (9 plays, 63 yards, 5:32)	UAB 35–10
4	03:08	UAB	DeWayne McBride 6-yard rush (Matthew Quinn kick) (6 plays, 48 yards, 3:08)	UAB 42–10

Statistics	UAB	South Alabama
First downs	22	18
Total yards	509	315
Rushing yards	190	147
Passing yards	319	168
Turnovers	1	2
Time of possession	35:00	25:00

Team	Category	Player	Statistics
UAB	Passing	Bryson Lucero	18/28, 319 yards, 2 TDs
UAB	Rushing	Spencer Brown	20 carries, 105 yards, 3 TDs
UAB	Receiving	Austin Watkins	7 receptions, 183 yards, 1 TD
South Alabama	Passing	Chance Lovertich	14/29, 168 yards, 1 TD, 1 INT
South Alabama	Rushing	Carlos Davis	17 carries, 105 yards
South Alabama	Receiving	Jalen Tolbert	3 receptions, 59 yards, 1 TD

=== Texas State ===
Texas State at South Alabama

Team	1	2	3	4	Total
Bobcats	7	3	7	3	20
• Jaguars	3	14	0	13	30

- Date: October 17, 2020
- Location: Hancock Whitney Stadium
  Mobile, AL
- Game start: 11:00 a.m. CDT
- Elapsed time: 3 hours and 29 minutes
- Game attendance: 5,142
- Game weather: 65 °F (18 °C) • Weather: Sunny • Wind: NNE 11 MPH
- Referee: T. Livingston
- TV announcers (ESPNU): Clay Matvick (play–by–play) and Rocky Boiman (analyst)

Scoring summary
1	06:53	USA	Diego Guajardo 33-yard field goal (10 plays, 50 yards, 4:04)	USA 3–0
1	04:07	TXST	Jackson Lanam 9-yard pass from Brady McBride (Seth Keller kick) (9 plays, 65 yards, 2:46)	TXST 7–3
2	13:19	USA	Carlos Davis 1-yard rush (Diego Guajardo kick) (14 plays, 75 yards, 5:48)	USA 10–7
2	04:48	TXST	Seth Keller 30-yard field goal (8 plays, 27 yards, 2:30)	TIE 10–10
2	00:12	USA	Jalen Tolbert 1-yard pass from Chance Lovertich (Diego Guajardo kick) (14 plays, 75 yards, 5:48)	USA 17–10
3	07:57	TXST	Brock Sturges 1-yard rush (Seth Keller kick) (3 plays, 50 yards, 0:48)	TIE 17–17
4	14:01	USA	Diego Guajardo 24-yard field goal (10 plays, 54 yards, 4:34)	USA 20–17
4	10:30	TXST	Seth Keller 41-yard field goal (8 plays, 41 yards, 3:31)	TIE 20–20
4	07:10	USA	Kawaan Baker 8-yard from Desmond Trotter (Diego Guajardo kick) (10 plays, 75 yards, 3:20)	USA 27–20
4	01:09	USA	Diego Guajardo 44-yard field goal (10 plays, 46 yards, 4:00)	USA 30–20

Statistics	Texas State	South Alabama
First downs	22	24
Total yards	348	385
Rushing yards	88	132
Passing yards	260	253
Turnovers	0	0
Time of possession	25:52	34:08

Team	Category	Player	Statistics
Texas State	Passing	Brady McBride	28/40, 260 yards, 1 TD
Texas State	Rushing	Jahmyl Jeter	5 carries, 31 yards
Texas State	Receiving	Jah'Marae Sheread	4 receptions, 72 yards
South Alabama	Passing	Desmond Trotter	18/22, 187 yards, 1 TD
South Alabama	Rushing	Carlos Davis	32 yards, 113 yards, 1 TD
South Alabama	Receiving	Jalen Tolbert	9 receptions, 91 yards, 1 TD

=== Louisiana–Monroe ===
Louisiana–Monroe at South Alabama

Team	1	2	3	4	Total
Warhawks	0	6	0	8	14
• Jaguars	17	0	14	7	38

- Date: October 24, 2020
- Location: Hancock Whitney Stadium
  Mobile, AL
- Game start: 6:00 p.m. CDT
- Elapsed time: 2 hours and 58 minutes
- Game attendance: 5,186
- Game weather: 77 °F (25 °C) • Weather: Partly Cloudy• Wind: None
- Referee: Wayne Winkler
- TV announcers (ESPN+): JD Byars (play–by–play) and Pat Greenwood (analyst)

Scoring summary
1	10:07	USA	Devin Rockette 95-yard interception returned (Diego Guajardo kick) (7 plays, 53 yards, 3:44)	USA 7–0
1	03:01	USA	Diego Guajardo 50-yard field goal (10 plays, 50 yards, 4:15)	USA 10–0
1	00:51	USA	Kawaan Baker 80-yard pass from Desmond Trotter (Diego Guajardo kick) (2 plays, 82 yards, 0:42)	USA 17–0
2	03:54	ULM	Josh Johnson 1-yard rush (Davis Hughes PAT failed) (8 plays, 85 yards, 3:35)	USA 17–7
3	04:25	USA	Desmond Trotter 5-yard rush (Diego Guajardo kick) (10 plays, 80 yards, 5:10)	USA 24–6
3	00:13	USA	Kawaan Baker 16-yard pass from Desmond Trotter (Diego Guajardo kick) (5 plays, 49 yards, 2:43)	USA 31–6
4	12:26	ULM	Jordan Carroll 4-yard pass from Colby Suits (Colby Suits two-point conversion pass to Jevin Frett) (6 plays, 75 yards, 2:47)	USA 31–14
4	01:39	USA	Kawaan Baker 5-yard pass from Desmond Trotter (Diego Guajardo kick) (16 plays, 71 yards, 10:47)	USA 38–14

Statistics	Louisiana–Monroe	South Alabama
First downs	20	20
Total yards	380	415
Rushing yards	98	169
Passing yards	286	246
Turnovers	2	1
Time of possession	28:29	31:31

Team	Category	Player	Statistics
Louisiana–Monroe	Passing	Colby Suits	23/34, 286 yards, 1 TD, 1 INT
Louisiana–Monroe	Rushing	Josh Johnson	15 carries, 49 yards, 1 TD
Louisiana–Monroe	Receiving	Jahquan Bloomfield	3 receptions, 69 yards
South Alabama	Passing	Desmond Trotter	8/12, 184 yards, 3 TDs
South Alabama	Rushing	Carlos Davis	17 carries, 58 yards
South Alabama	Receiving	Kawaan Baker	6 receptions, 154 yards, 3 TDs

=== At Georgia Southern ===
South Alabama at Georgia Southern

Team	1	2	3	4	Total
Jaguars	3	7	7	0	17
• Eagles	0	10	0	14	24

- Date: October 29, 2020
- Location: Paulson Stadium
  Statesboro, GA
- Game start: 7:32 p.m. EDT
- Elapsed time: 3 hours and 13 minutes
- Game attendance: 3,457
- Referee: Kyle Olsen
- TV announcers (ESPN): Matt Barrie (play–by–play), Mike Golic Jr. (analyst), and Lericia Harris (sideline reporter)

Scoring summary
1	10:07	USA	Diego Guajardo 54-yard field goal (10 plays, 40 yards, 4:53)	USA 3–0
2	10:09	GASO	Alex Raynor 29-yard field goal (11 plays, 81 yards, 5:56)	TIE 3–3
2	06:05	GASO	J. D. King 13-yard rush (Alex Raynor kick) (6 plays, 52 yards, 3:00)	GASO 10–3
2	02:50	USA	Brandon Crum 3-yard pass from Desmond Trotter (Diego Guajardo kick) (8 plays, 70 yards, 3:15)	TIE 10–10
3	01:39	USA	Jalen Tolbert 12-yard pass from Desmond Trotter (Diego Guajardo kick) (6 plays, 52 yards, 2:28)	USA 17–10
4	12:57	GASO	Wesley Kennedy III 14-yard rush (Alex Raynor kick) (7 plays, 75 yards, 3:42)	TIE 17–17
4	08:02	GASO	Wesley Kennedy III 15-yard rush (Alex Raynor kick) (5 plays, 47 yards, 2:45)	GASO 24–17

Statistics	South Alabama	Georgia Southern
First downs	16	15
Total yards	264	345
Rushing yards	64	250
Passing yards	200	95
Turnovers	1	1
Time of possession	28:19	31:41

Team	Category	Player	Statistics
South Alabama	Passing	Desmond Trotter	20/27, 200 yards, 2 TDs
South Alabama	Rushing	Carlos Davis	20 carries, 70 yards
South Alabama	Receiving	Kawaan Baker	5 receptions, 65 yards
Georgia Southern	Passing	Shai Werts	5/9, 95 yards, 1 INT
Georgia Southern	Rushing	Wesley Kennedy III	13 carries, 91 yards, 2 TDs
Georgia Southern	Receiving	Malik Murray	1 reception, 38 yards

=== At Coastal Carolina ===
South Alabama at Coastal Carolina

Team	1	2	3	4	Total
Jaguars	3	3	0	0	6
• No. 15 Chanticleers	14	3	0	6	23

- Date: November 7, 2020
- Location: Brooks Stadium
  Conway, SC
- Game start: 8:02 p.m. CST
- Elapsed time: 3 hours, 6 minutes
- Game attendance: 5,000
- Game weather: 69 °F (21 °C) • Weather: Clear • Wind: NE, 5 MPH
- Referee: Marshall Lewis
- TV announcers (ESPNU): Courtney Lyle (play–by–play) and Rene Ingoglia (analyst)

Scoring summary
1	10:24	CCU	Shermari Jones 1-yard run (Massimo Biscardi kick) (7 plays, 72 yards, 2:48)	CCU 7–0
1	5:06	USA	Diego Guajardo 31-yard field goal (11 plays, 62 yards, 5:18)	CCU 7–3
1	5:06	CCU	C. J. Marable 9-yard pass from Grayson McCall (Massimo Biscardi kick) (6 plays, 75 yards, 2:50)	CCU 14–3
2	5:08	USA	Diego Guajardo 43-yard field goal (13 plays, 74 yards, 5:15)	CCU 14–6
2	0:18	CCU	Massimo Biscardi 26-yard field goal (7 plays, 61 yards, 2:11)	CCU 17–6
4	10:47	CCU	Massimo Biscardi 30-yard field goal (7 plays, 46 yards, 3:33)	CCU 20–6
4	6:07	CCU	Massimo Biscardi 27-yard field goal (8 plays, 72 yards, 4:10)	CCU 23–6

Statistics	South Alabama	Coastal Carolina
First downs	16	18
Total yards	336	445
Rushing yards	93	236
Passing yards	243	209
Turnovers	2	2
Time of possession	30:15	29:45

Team	Category	Player	Statistics
South Alabama	Passing	Desmond Trotter	23/31, 243 yards
South Alabama	Rushing	Carlos Davis	17 carries, 73 yards
South Alabama	Receiving	Jalen Wayne	5 receptions, 91 yards
Coastal Carolina	Passing	Grayson McCall	17/24, 209 yards, 1 TD
Coastal Carolina	Rushing	Reese White	9 carries, 81 yards
Coastal Carolina	Receiving	Jaivon Heiligh	5 receptions, 95 yards

=== At Louisiana ===
South Alabama at Louisiana

Team	1	2	3	4	Total
Jaguars	3	7	0	0	10
• No. 25 Ragin' Cajuns	14	14	3	7	38

- Date: November 14, 2020
- Location: Cajun Field
  Lafayette, LA
- Game start: 1:06 p.m. CST
- Elapsed time: 3 hours and 9 minutes
- Game attendance: 5,585
- Game weather: 79 °F (26 °C) • Weather: Mostly Cloudy • Wind: S 10 MPH
- Referee: Jeremy Parker
- TV announcers (ESPN+): Dan McDonald (play–by–play) and Chris Lanaux (analyst)

Scoring summary
1	10:25	LA	Jalen Williams 5-yard pass from Levi Lewis (Kenneth Almendares kick) (9 plays, 57 yards, 3:07)	LA 7–0
1	08:28	LA	Chris Smith 22-yard rush (Kenneth Almendares kick) (3 plays, 26 yards, 0:49)	LA 14–0
1	01:05	USA	Diego Guajardo 26-yard field goal (15 plays, 52 yards, 7:14)	LA 14–3
2	07:54	LA	Errol Rogers Jr. 3-yard pass from Levi Lewis (Kenneth Almendares kick) (11 plays, 75 yards, 5:05)	LA 21–3
2	04:04	USA	Kawaan Baker 7-yard pass from Desmond Trotter (Diego Guajardo kick) (10 plays, 75 yards, 3:50)	LA 21–10
2	01:55	LA	Elijah Mitchell 5-yard rush (Kenneth Almendares kick) (6 plays, 78 yards, 2:04)	LA 28–10
3	02:32	LA	Kenneth Almendares 25-yard field goal (7 plays, 82 yards, 3:54)	LA 31–10
4	10:59	LA	Trey Ragas 25-yard pass from Levi Lewis (Kenneth Almendares kick) (10 plays, 80 yards, 4:16)	LA 38–10

Statistics	South Alabama	Louisiana
First downs	19	23
Total yards	268	506
Rushing yards	123	254
Passing yards	145	252
Turnovers	2	2
Time of possession	31:47	28:13

Team	Category	Player	Statistics
South Alabama	Passing	Desmond Trotter	15/28, 133 yards, 1 TD, 1 INT
South Alabama	Rushing	Terrion Avery	14 carries, 62 yards
South Alabama	Receiving	Jalen Tolbert	5 receptions, 64 yards
Louisiana	Passing	Levi Lewis	21/31, 252 yards, 3 TDs, 1 INT
Louisiana	Rushing	Chris Smith	7 carries, 99 yards, 1 TD
Louisiana	Receiving	Neal Johnson	3 receptions, 40 yards

=== Georgia State ===
Georgia State at South Alabama

Team	1	2	3	4	Total
• Panthers	0	7	14	10	31
Jaguars	7	0	7	0	14

- Date: November 21, 2020
- Location: Hancock Whitney Stadium
  Mobile, AL
- Game start: 2:30 p.m. CST
- Elapsed time: 3 hours and 25 minutes
- Game attendance: 5,224
- Game weather: 76 °F (24 °C) • Weather: Mostly Cloudy • Wind: ESE 7 MPH
- Referee: Kyle Olson
- TV announcers (ESPNU): Mike Couzens (play–by–play) and Rocky Boiman (analyst)

Scoring summary
1	13:05	USA	Carlos Davis 17-yard rush (Diego Guajardo kick) (4 plays, 34 yards, 1:43)	USA 7-0
2	13:25	GSU	Cornelious Brown IV 1-yard rush (Michael Hayes Kick) (15 plays, 96 yards, 6:28)	TIE 7-7
3	6:11	USA	Jared Wilson 7-yard rush (Diego Guajardo kick) (8 plays, 70 yards, 1:32)	USA 14-7
3	5:16	GSU	Tucker Gregg 3-yard rush (Michael Hayes kick) (3 plays, 75 yards, 0:55)	TIE 14-14
3	2:05	GSU	Tucker Gregg 33-yard rush (Michael Hayes kick) (5 plays, 80 yards, 1:46)	GSU 21-14
4	11:03	GSU	Michael Hayes 23-yard field goal (12 plays, 73 yards, 4:40)	GSU 24-14
4	5:33	GSU	Tucker Gregg 1-yard rush (Michael Hayes kick) (5 plays, 55 yards, 3:06)	GSU 31-14

Statistics	Georgia State	South Alabama
First downs	19	19
Total yards	556	324
Rushing yards	222	113
Passing yards	334	211
Turnovers	4	1
Time of possession	29:16	30:44

Team	Category	Player	Statistics
Georgia State	Passing	Cornelious Brown IV	19/28, 334 yards, 3 INTs
Georgia State	Rushing	Tucker Gregg	18 carries, 79 yards, 3 TDs
Georgia State	Receiving	Sam Pickney	5 receptions, 176 yards
South Alabama	Passing	Desmond Trotter	25/43, 211 yards
South Alabama	Rushing	Jared Wilson	7 carries, 49 yards, 1 TD
South Alabama	Receiving	Jalen Tolbert	5 receptions, 75 yards

=== At Arkansas State ===
South Alabama at Arkansas State

Team	1	2	3	4	Total
• Jaguars	7	7	14	10	38
Red Wolves	7	10	7	7	31

- Date: November 28, 2020
- Location: Centennial Bank Stadium
  Jonesboro, AR
- Game start: 2:05 p.m. CST
- Elapsed time: 3 hours and 39 minutes
- Game attendance: 4,013
- Referee: T. Livingston
- TV announcers (ESPN3): Roger Twibell (play–by–play), Pete Cordelli (analyst), and Cori Keller (sideline reporter)

Scoring summary
1	08:50	ARST	Brandon Bowling 3-yard pass from Logan Bonner (Blake Grupe kick) (9 plays, 69 yards, 3:31)	ARST 7–0
1	00:35	USA	Desmond Trotter 2-yard rush (Diego Guajardo kick) (10 plays, 72 yards, 3:57)	TIE 7–7
2	11:23	USA	Kawaan Baker 26-yard pass from Desmond Trotter (Diego Guajardo kick) (8 plays, 64 yards, 3:19)	USA 14–7
2	01:09	ARST	Brandon Bowling 25-yard pass from Logan Bonner (Blake Grupe kick) (8 plays, 75 yards, 3:19)	TIE 14–14
2	00:00	ARST	Blake Grupe 35-yard field goal (4 plays, 64 yards, 0:31)	ARST 17–14
3	09:55	ARST	Jonathan Adams Jr. 14-yard pass from Logan Bonner (Blake Grupe kick) (9 plays, 75 yards, 4:59)	ARST 24–14
3	06:39	USA	Jalen Tolbert 42-yard pass from Desmond Trotter (Diego Guajardo kick) (8 plays, 82 yards, 3:10)	ARST 24–21
3	00:34	USA	Jalen Tolbert 37-yard pass from Tanner McGee (Diego Guajardo kick) (6 plays, 73 yards, 2:38)	USA 28–24
4	12:03	ARST	Jonathan Adams Jr. 3-yard pass from Logan Bonner (Blake Grupe kick) (8 plays, 71 yards, 3:24)	ARST 31–28
4	04:56	USA	Jalen Tolbert 51-yard pass from Tanner McGee (Diego Guajardo kick) (5 plays, 61 yards, 1:59)	USA 35–31
4	01:24	USA	Diego Guajardo 30-yard field goal (6 plays, 19 yards, 1:56)	USA 38–31

Statistics	South Alabama	Arkansas State
First downs	25	25
Total yards	486	494
Rushing yards	99	170
Passing yards	387	324
Turnovers	1	0
Time of possession	31:03	28:57

Team	Category	Player	Statistics
South Alabama	Passing	Desmond Trotter	16/22, 242 yards, 2 TDs
South Alabama	Rushing	Carlos Davis	12 carries, 31 yards
South Alabama	Receiving	Jalen Tolbert	10 receptions, 252 yards, 3 TDs
Arkansas State	Passing	Logan Bonner	11/16, 183 yards, 4 TDs
Arkansas State	Rushing	Jamal Jones	19 carries, 93 yards
Arkansas State	Receiving	Jonathan Adams Jr.	9 receptions, 138 yards, 2 TDs

=== Troy ===
Troy at South Alabama

Team	1	2	3	4	Total
• Trojans	3	24	0	2	29
Jaguars	0	0	0	0	0

- Date: December 5, 2020
- Location: Hancock Whitney Stadium
  Mobile, AL
- Game start: 1:00 p.m. CST
- Elapsed time: 2 hours and 52 minutes
- Game attendance: 5,375
- Game weather: 58 °F (14 °C) • Weather: Sunny • Wind: NNE 6 MPH
- Referee: Marshall Lewis
- TV announcers (ESPN3): J. D. Byars (play–by–play) and Pat Greenwood (analyst)

Scoring summary
1	06:02	TROY	Evan Legassey 22-yard field goal (13 plays, 56 yards, 4:17)	TROY 3–0
2	11:06	TROY	Khalil McClain 15-yard pass from Gunnar Watson (Evan Legassey kick) (10 plays, 89 yards, 3:48)	TROY 10–0
2	09:26	TROY	Kaylon Geiger 15-yard pass from Gunnar Watson (Evan Legassey kick) (3 plays, 28 yards, 0:40)	TROY 17–0
2	03:56	TROY	Tray Eafford 21-yard pass from Gunnar Watson (Evan Legassey kick) (8 plays, 68 yards, 2:51)	TROY 24–0
2	00:08	TROY	Evan Legassey 44-yard field goal (4 plays, 29 yards, 0:23)	TROY 27–0
4	07:02	TROY	Team Safety (3 plays, -7 yards, 0:54)	TROY 29–0

Statistics	Troy	South Alabama
First downs	25	17
Total yards	414	239
Rushing yards	117	57
Passing yards	297	182
Turnovers	1	2
Time of possession	31:47	28:13

Team	Category	Player	Statistics
Troy	Passing	Gunnar Watson	34/41, 297 yards, 3 TDs
Troy	Rushing	Kimani Vidal	22 carries, 76 yards
Troy	Receiving	Tray Eafford	4 receptions, 67 yards, 1 TD
South Alabama	Passing	Desmond Trotter	15/28, 144 yards, 1 INT
South Alabama	Rushing	Caullin Lacy	4 carries, 38 yards
South Alabama	Receiving	Jalen Tolbert	5 receptions, 92 yards
