= 2020 Troy Trojans football team =

American college football season

2020 Troy Trojans football
- Conference: Sun Belt Conference
- East Division
- Record: 5–6 (3–4 Sun Belt)
- Head coach: Chip Lindsey (2nd season)
- Offensive coordinator: Ryan Pugh (2nd season)
- Offensive scheme: Spread
- Defensive coordinator: Brandon Hall (2nd season)
- Base defense: 4–3
- Home stadium: Veterans Memorial Stadium

2020 Sun Belt Conference football standings
| | Conf. | | | Overall |
| Team | W | | L | W | | L |
|---|---|---|---|---|---|---|
East Division
| No. 14 Coastal Carolina xy+ | 8 | – | 0 | 11 | – | 1 |
| Appalachian State | 6 | – | 2 | 9 | – | 3 |
| Georgia Southern | 4 | – | 4 | 8 | – | 5 |
| Georgia State | 4 | – | 4 | 6 | – | 4 |
| Troy | 3 | – | 4 | 5 | – | 6 |
West Division
| No. 15 Louisiana xy+ | 7 | – | 1 | 10 | – | 1 |
| South Alabama | 3 | – | 5 | 4 | – | 7 |
| Arkansas State | 2 | – | 6 | 4 | – | 7 |
| Texas State | 2 | – | 6 | 2 | – | 10 |
| Louisiana–Monroe | 0 | – | 7 | 0 | – | 10 |
Championship: Louisiana at Coastal Carolina (Canceled)
+ – Conference co-champions; x – Division champion/co-champions; y – Championship game participant; Rankings from AP Poll

The 2020 Troy Trojans football team represented Troy University in the 2020 NCAA Division I FBS football season. The Trojans played their home games at Veterans Memorial Stadium in Troy, Alabama, and competed in the East Division of the Sun Belt Conference. They were led by second-year head coach Chip Lindsey.

== Schedule ==
Troy had games scheduled against Arkansas–Pine Bluff, NC State, Tennessee, and UMass, but were canceled due to the COVID-19 pandemic.

| Date | Time | Opponent | Site | TV | Result | Attendance |
|---|---|---|---|---|---|---|
| September 19 | 3:00 p.m. | at Middle Tennessee* | Johnny "Red" Floyd Stadium; Murfreesboro, TN (Battle for the Palladium) | ESPN | W 47–14 | 6,000 |
| September 26 | 9:15 p.m. | at No. 18 BYU* | LaVell Edwards Stadium; Provo, UT | ESPN | L 7–48 | 0 |
| October 10 | 2:30 p.m. | Texas State | Veterans Memorial Stadium; Troy, AL | ESPN3 | W 37–17 | 10,500 |
| October 17 | 2:30 p.m. | Eastern Kentucky* | Veterans Memorial Stadium; Troy, AL | ESPN3 | W 31–29 | 10,500 |
| October 24 | 3:00 p.m. | Georgia State^{†} | Veterans Memorial Stadium; Troy, AL | ESPNU | L 34–36 | 12,000 |
| October 31 | 2:00 p.m. | at Arkansas State | Centennial Bank Stadium; Jonesboro, AR | ESPN3 | W 38–10 | 6,757 |
| November 7 | 12:00 p.m. | at Georgia Southern | Paulson Stadium; Statesboro, GA | ESPN3 | L 13–20 | 5,012 |
| November 21 | 2:30 p.m. | Middle Tennessee* | Veterans Memorial Stadium; Troy, AL | ESPN3 | L 17–20 | 12,000 |
| November 28 | 7:00 p.m. | at Appalachian State | Kidd Brewer Stadium; Boone, NC | ESPN2 | L 10–47 | 2,100 |
| December 5 | 1:00 p.m. | at South Alabama | Hancock Whitney Stadium; Mobile, AL (rivalry) | ESPN3 | W 29–0 | 5,375 |
| December 12 | 2:00 p.m. | No. 13 Coastal Carolina | Veterans Memorial Stadium; Troy, AL | ESPN+ | L 38–42 | 11,000 |
*Non-conference game; ^{†}Homecoming; Rankings from AP Poll and CFP Rankings after November 24 released prior to game; All times are in Central time

== Game summaries ==
=== At Middle Tennessee ===
Troy at Middle Tennessee State

| Team | 1 | 2 | 3 | 4 | Total |
|---|---|---|---|---|---|
| • Trojans | 7 | 19 | 14 | 7 | 47 |
| Blue Raiders | 7 | 0 | 0 | 7 | 14 |

- Date: September 19, 2020
- Location: Johnny "Red" Floyd Stadium
  Murfreesboro, TN
- Game start: 2:35 p.m. CDT
- Elapsed time: 3 hours and 23 minutes
- Game attendance: 6,000
- Game weather: 72 °F (22 °C) • Weather: Hazy, Cool, Nice • Wind: 6 N MPH
- Referee: Ken Antee
- TV announcers (ESPN): Dave Neal (play–by–play), Jay Walker (analyst), and Dawn Davenport (sideline reporter)

Scoring summary
| 1 | 11:13 | TROY | Khalil McClain 8-yard pass from Gunnar Watson (Evan Legassey kick) (12 plays, 73 yards, 3:47) | TROY 7–0 |
| 1 | 01:33 | MTSU | Asher O'Hara 2-yard rush (Crews Holt kick) (9 plays, 69 yards, 3:11) | TIE 7–7 |
| 2 | 14:11 | TROY | Charlie Strong 1-yard rush (Evan Legassey kick) (7 plays, 61 yards, 2:14) | TROY 14–7 |
| 2 | 06:50 | TROY | Evan Legassey 47-yard field goal (8 plays, 22 yards, 2:40) | TROY 17–7 |
| 2 | 01:29 | TROY | Team Safety (3 plays, −6 yards, 0:15) | TROY 19–7 |
| 2 | 00:03 | TROY | Khalil McClain 5-yard pass from Gunnar Watson (Evan Legassey kick) (10 plays, 60 yards, 1:20) | TROY 26–7 |
| 3 | 09:56 | TROY | Carloss Crawford 1-yard rush (Evan Legassey kick) (10 plays, 38 yards, 4:20) | TROY 33–7 |
| 3 | 03:29 | TROY | DK Billingsley 2-yard rush (Evan Legassey kick) (11 plays, 70 yards, 4:56) | TROY 40–7 |
| 4 | 06:22 | TROY | Tyler Hussey 8-yard pass from Jacob Free (Evan Legassey kick) (7 plays, 72 yards, 3:37) | TROY 47–7 |
| 4 | 01:54 | MTSU | Jaylin Lane 28-yard pass from Mike Diliello (Crews Holt kick) (9 plays, 70 yards, 4:22) | TROY 47–14 |

| Statistics | Troy | Middle Tennessee |
|---|---|---|
| First downs | 30 | 15 |
| Total yards | 496 | 241 |
| Rushing yards | 240 | 87 |
| Passing yards | 256 | 154 |
| Turnovers | 2 | 3 |
| Time of possession | 35:45 | 24:15 |

| Team | Category | Player | Statistics |
|---|---|---|---|
| Troy | Passing | Gunnar Watson | 26/37, 248 yards, 2 TDs, 1 INT |
| Troy | Rushing | B. J. Smith | 10 carries, 81 yards |
| Troy | Receiving | Khalil McClain | 6 receptions, 75 yards, 2 TDs |
| Middle Tennessee | Passing | Asher O'Hara | 16/23, 109 yards, 1 INT |
| Middle Tennessee | Rushing | Asher O'Hara | 14 carries, 45 yards, 1 TD |
| Middle Tennessee | Receiving | Jarrin Pierce | 11 receptions, 81 yards |

=== At BYU ===
Troy at Brigham Young

| Team | 1 | 2 | 3 | 4 | Total |
|---|---|---|---|---|---|
| Trojans | 0 | 0 | 7 | 0 | 7 |
| • No. 18 Cougars | 7 | 17 | 14 | 10 | 48 |

- Date: September 26, 2020
- Location: LaVell Edwards Stadium
  Provo, UT
- Game start: 9:20 p.m. CDT
- Elapsed time: 3 hours and 9 minutes
- Game attendance: 0
- Game weather: 64 °F (18 °C) • Weather: Sunny • Wind: 9 NW MPH
- Referee: Marshall Lewis
- TV announcers (ESPN): Dave Flemming (play-by-play), Rod Gilmore (analyst), and Stormy Buonantony (sideline reporter)

Scoring summary
| 1 | 01:26 | BYU | Masen Wake 1-yard rush (Jake Oldroyd kick) (8 plays, 64 yards, 4:25) | BYU 7–0 |
| 2 | 11:03 | BYU | Zach Wilson 1-yard rush (Jake Oldroyd kick) (8 plays, 74 yards, 2:51) | BYU 14–0 |
| 2 | 01:49 | BYU | Isaac Rex 10-yard pass from Zach Wilson (Jake Oldroyd kick) (7 plays, 87 yards, 3:30) | BYU 21–0 |
| 2 | 01:05 | TROY | B. J. Smith 2-yard rush (Evan Legassey kick) (7 plays, 75 yards, 0:44) | BYU 21–7 |
| 2 | 00:00 | BYU | Jake Oldroyd 54-yard field goal (6 plays, 41 yards, 1:05) | BYU 24–7 |
| 3 | 14:27 | BYU | Dax Milne 70-yard pass from Zach Wilson (Jake Oldroyd kick) (2 plays, 75 yards, 0:33) | BYU 31–7 |
| 3 | 03:50 | BYU | Zach Wilson 2-yard rush (Jake Oldroyd kick) (7 plays, 64 yards, 3:27) | BYU 38–7 |
| 4 | 14:54 | BYU | Masen Wake 10-yard rush (Jake Oldroyd kick) (6 plays, 60 yards, 2:02) | BYU 45–7 |
| 4 | 07:30 | BYU | Jake Oldroyd 30-yard field goal (11 plays, 63 yards, 6:16) | BYU 48–7 |

| Statistics | Troy | BYU |
|---|---|---|
| First downs | 8 | 32 |
| Total yards | 181 | 664 |
| Rushing yards | 19 | 192 |
| Passing yards | 162 | 472 |
| Turnovers | 0 | 1 |
| Time of possession | 19:53 | 40:07 |

| Team | Category | Player | Statistics |
|---|---|---|---|
| Troy | Passing | Gunnar Watson | 21/33, 162 yards |
| Troy | Rushing | Kimani Vidal | 4 carries, 23 yards |
| Troy | Receiving | Tray Eafford | 2 receptions, 59 yards |
| BYU | Passing | Zach Wilson | 23/28, 392 yards, 2 TDs |
| BYU | Rushing | Lopini Katoa | 11 carries, 76 yards |
| BYU | Receiving | Dax Milne | 7 receptions, 140 yards, 1 TD |

=== Texas State ===
Texas State at Troy

| Team | 1 | 2 | 3 | 4 | Total |
|---|---|---|---|---|---|
| Bobcats | 3 | 0 | 7 | 7 | 17 |
| • Trojans | 6 | 17 | 7 | 7 | 37 |

- Date: October 10, 2020
- Location: Veterans Memorial Stadium
  Troy, AL
- Game start: 2:35 p.m. CDT
- Elapsed time: 3 hours and 25 minutes
- Game attendance: 10,500
- Game weather: 76 °F (24 °C) • Weather: Humid • Wind: N 13 MPH
- Referee: Wayne Winkler
- TV announcers (ESPN3): Will Kollmeyer (play–by–play) and Ben Stanfield (analyst)

Scoring summary
| 1 | 11:18 | TXST | Seth Keller 38-yard field goal (7 plays, 14 yards, 2:11) | TXST 3–0 |
| 1 | 02:08 | TROY | Reggie Todd 30-yard pass from Gunnar Watson (Evan Legassey PAT blocked) (5 plays, 80 yards, 2:20) | TROY 6–3 |
| 2 | 11:50 | TROY | Reggie Todd 19-yard from Gunnar Watson (Evan Legassey kick) (11 plays, 76 yards, 4:47) | TROY 13–3 |
| 2 | 07:22 | TROY | Kaylon Geiger 38-yard pass from Gunnar Watson (Evan Legassey kick) (6 plays, 67 yards, 2:36) | TROY 20–3 |
| 2 | 03:06 | TROY | Evan Legassey 46-yard field goal (4 plays, 4 yards, 1:17) | TROY 23–3 |
| 3 | 07:31 | TXST | Blake Aragon 4-yard pass from Brady McBride (Seth Keller kick) (8 plays, 49 yards, 3:18) | TROY 23–10 |
| 3 | 03:19 | TROY | Tray Eafford 11-yard pass from Gunnar Watson (Evan Legassey kick) (5 plays, 51 yards, 1:52) | TROY 30–10 |
| 4 | 09:17 | TROY | B. J. Smith 2-yard rush (Evan Legassey kick) (5 plays, 66 yards, 2:24) | TROY 37–10 |
| 4 | 00:38 | TXST | Jahmyl Jeter 6-yard rush (Seth Keller kick) (10 plays, 80 yards, 3:01) | TROY 37–17 |

| Statistics | Texas State | Troy |
|---|---|---|
| First downs | 15 | 26 |
| Total yards | 254 | 488 |
| Rushing yards | 161 | 150 |
| Passing yards | 93 | 338 |
| Turnovers | 1 | 0 |
| Time of possession | 25:59 | 34:01 |

| Team | Category | Player | Statistics |
|---|---|---|---|
| Texas State | Passing | Brady McBride | 15/28, 93 yards, 1 TD |
| Texas State | Rushing | Calvin Hill | 6 carries, 57 yards |
| Texas State | Receiving | Javen Banks | 1 reception, 17 yards |
| Troy | Passing | Gunnar Watson | 33/46, 338 yards, 4 TDs |
| Troy | Rushing | Kimani Vidal | 12 carries, 106 yards |
| Troy | Receiving | Kaylon Geiger | 7 receptions, 121 yards, 1 TD |

=== Eastern Kentucky ===
Eastern Kentucky at Troy

| Team | 1 | 2 | 3 | 4 | Total |
|---|---|---|---|---|---|
| Colonels | 7 | 10 | 0 | 12 | 29 |
| • Trojans | 14 | 7 | 7 | 3 | 31 |

- Date: October 17, 2020
- Location: Veterans Memorial Stadium
  Troy, AL
- Game start: 2:35 p.m. CDT
- Elapsed time: 3 hours and 37 minutes
- Game attendance: 10,500
- Game weather: 71 °F (22 °C) • Weather: Clear • Wind: W 5 MPH
- Referee: Marshall Lewis
- TV announcers (ESPN3): Will Kollmeyer (play–by–play) and Ben Stanfield (analyst)

Scoring summary
| 1 | 12:53 | TROY | AJ Lewis 16-yard pass from Gunnar Watson (Evan Legassey kick) (6 plays, 91 yards, 2:07) | TROY 7–0 |
| 1 | 06:38 | EKU | Keyion Dixon 90-yard pass from Parker McKinney (Alexander Woznick kick) (2 plays, 96 yards, 0:45) | TIE 7–7 |
| 1 | 03:16 | TROY | Khalil McClain 9-yard pass from Gunnar Watson (Evan Legassey kick) (8 plays, 60 yards, 3:22) | TROY 14–7 |
| 2 | 13:37 | EKU | Alexander Woznick 19-yard field goal (4 plays, 1 yard, 1:34) | TROY 14–10 |
| 2 | 04:49 | EKU | Alonzo Both 12-yard rush (Alexander Woznick kick) (14 plays, 85 yards, 6:45) | EKU 17–14 |
| 2 | 02:26 | TROY | Kimani Vidal 1-yard rush (Evan Legassey kick) (7 plays, 77 yards, 2:23) | TROY 21–17 |
| 3 | 09:35 | TROY | Reggie Todd 22-yard pass from Gunnar Watson (Evan Legassey kick); 8 plays, 80 yards, 2:33) | TROY 28–17 |
| 4 | 14:41 | EKU | Alexander Woznick 22-yard field goal (9 plays, 42 yards, 3:25) | TROY 28–20 |
| 4 | 05:50 | EKU | Alexander Woznick 25-yard field goal (4 plays, 22 yards, 1:43) | TROY 28–23 |
| 4 | 00:21 | EKU | Keyion Dixon 4-yard pass from Parker McKinney (two-point pass conversion attempt failed) (10 plays, 80 yards, 2:28) | EKU 29–28 |
| 4 | 00:00 | TROY | Evan Legassey 47-yard field goal (3 plays, 30 yards, 0:21) | TROY 31–29 |

| Statistics | Eastern Kentucky | Troy |
|---|---|---|
| First downs | 21 | 27 |
| Total yards | 425 | 507 |
| Rushing yards | 55 | 174 |
| Passing yards | 370 | 333 |
| Turnovers | 1 | 3 |
| Time of possession | 34:12 | 25:48 |

| Team | Category | Player | Statistics |
|---|---|---|---|
| Eastern Kentucky | Passing | Parker McKinney | 30/47, 370 yards, 2 TDs, 1 INT |
| Eastern Kentucky | Rushing | Alonzo Booth | 15 carries, 39 yards, 1 TD |
| Eastern Kentucky | Receiving | Keyion Dixon | 8 receptions, 196 yards, 2 TDs |
| Troy | Passing | Gunnar Watson | 26/38, 333 yards, 3 TDs, 2 INTs |
| Troy | Rushing | Kimani Vidal | 13 carries, 143 yards, 1 TD |
| Troy | Receiving | Kaylon Geiger | 7 receptions, 100 yards |

=== Georgia State ===
Georgia State at Troy

| Team | 1 | 2 | 3 | 4 | Total |
|---|---|---|---|---|---|
| • Panthers | 7 | 6 | 20 | 3 | 36 |
| Trojans | 7 | 14 | 0 | 13 | 34 |

- Date: October 24, 2020
- Location: Veterans Memorial Stadium
  Troy, AL
- Game start: 3:02 p.m. CDT
- Elapsed time: 3 hours and 40 minutes
- Game attendance: 12,000
- Game weather: 69 °F (21 °C) • Weather: Overcast • Wind: NW 3 MPH
- Referee: Kyle Olson
- TV announcers (ESPNU): Clay Matvick (play–by–play) and Rocky Boiman (analyst)

Scoring summary
| 1 | 10:23 | GSU | Rogers Carter 4-yard pass from Cornelious Brown IV (Noel Ruiz kick) (11 plays, 75 yards, 4:37) | GSU 7–0 |
| 1 | 00:58 | TROY | Khalil McClain 10-yard pass from Gunnar Watson (Evan Legassey kick) (8 plays, 87 yards, 3:04) | TIE 7–7 |
| 2 | 10:55 | GSU | Noel Ruiz 46-yard field goal (11 plays, 47 yards, 5:03) | GSU 10–7 |
| 2 | 06:07 | TROY | Reddy Stewart 35-yard interception returned (Evan Legassey kick) (3 plays, 6 yards, 1:16) | TROY 14–10 |
| 2 | 05:29 | TROY | Shakel Brown 21-yard fumble returned (Evan Legassey kick) (2 plays, −4 yards, 0:38) | TROY 21–10 |
| 2 | 00:39 | GSU | Noel Ruiz 31-yard field goal (10 plays, 62 yards, 4:50) | TROY 21–13 |
| 3 | 09:02 | GSU | Tucker Gregg 27-yard rush (Noel Ruiz kick) (7 plays, 58 yards, 2:34) | TROY 21–20 |
| 3 | 06:05 | GSU | Roger Carter 36-yard pass from Cornelious Brown IV (Noel Ruiz PAT blocked) (6 plays, 72 yards, 2:01) | GSU 26–21 |
| 3 | 04:24 | GSU | Cornelious Brown IV 2-yard rush (Noel Ruiz kick) (3 plays, 8 yards, 0:50) | GSU 33–21 |
| 4 | 13:29 | TROY | AJ Lewis 2-yard pass from Jacob Free (Evan Legassey kick) (4 plays, 52 yards, 1:20) | GSU 33–28 |
| 4 | 06:54 | GSU | Noel Ruiz 37-yard field goal (14 plays, 55 yards, 6:35) | GSU 36–28 |
| 4 | 00:37 | TROY | Reggie Todd 11-yard pass from Jacob Free (two-point conversion attempt failed) (7 plays, 47 yards, 0:00) | GSU 36–34 |

| Statistics | Georgia State | Troy |
|---|---|---|
| First downs | 23 | 23 |
| Total yards | 379 | 447 |
| Rushing yards | 210 | 40 |
| Passing yards | 169 | 407 |
| Turnovers | 3 | 4 |
| Time of possession | 37:42 | 22:18 |

| Team | Category | Player | Statistics |
|---|---|---|---|
| Georgia State | Passing | Cornelious Brown IV | 20/30, 169 yards, 2 TDs, 1 INT |
| Georgia State | Rushing | Destin Coates | 25 carries, 115 yards |
| Georgia State | Receiving | Roger Carter | 7 receptions, 72 yards, 2 TDs |
| Troy | Passing | Jacob Free | 24/38, 329 yards, 2 TDs, 2 INTs |
| Troy | Rushing | Kimani Vidal | 7 carries, 24 yards |
| Troy | Receiving | Reggie Todd | 8 receptions, 130 yards, 1 TD |

=== At Arkansas State ===
Troy at Arkansas State

| Team | 1 | 2 | 3 | 4 | Total |
|---|---|---|---|---|---|
| • Trojans | 14 | 10 | 0 | 14 | 38 |
| Red Wolves | 0 | 3 | 7 | 0 | 10 |

- Date: October 31, 2020
- Location: Centennial Bank Stadium
  Jonesboro, AR
- Game start: 2:05 p.m. CDT
- Elapsed time: 3 hours and 15 minutes
- Game attendance: 6,757
- Game weather: 61 °F (16 °C) • Weather: Mostly Clear • Wind: SSE 6 MPH
- Referee: T. Livingston
- TV announcers (ESPN3): Roger Twibell (play–by–play), Pete Cordelli (analyst), and Cori Keller (sideline reporter)

Scoring summary
| 1 | 12:35 | TROY | Luke Whittemore 29-yard pass from Jacob Free (Evan Legasssey kick) (7 plays, 73 yards, 2:25) | TROY 7–0 |
| 1 | 05:39 | TROY | Reggie Todd 34-yard pass from Jacob Free (Evan Legasssey kick) (7 plays, 79 yards, 2:19) | TROY 14–0 |
| 2 | 09:10 | ARST | Blake Grupe 39-yard field goal (12 plays, 76 yards, 4:36) | TROY 14–3 |
| 2 | 07:07 | TROY | Evan Legassey 35-yard field goal (6 plays, 36 yards, 2:03) | TROY 17–3 |
| 2 | 00:41 | TROY | Jacob Free 6-yard rush (Evan Legasssey kick) (8 plays, 64 yards, 1:47) | TROY 24–3 |
| 3 | 04:55 | ARST | Jonathan Adams Jr. 3-yard pass from Layne Hatcher (Blake Grupe kick) (5 plays, 90 yards, 1:23) | TROY 24–10 |
| 4 | 07:34 | TROY | Darrell Starling 20-yard fumble returned (Evan Legasssey kick) (6 plays, 17 yards, 1:41) | TROY 31–10 |
| 4 | 00:26 | TROY | Kimani Vidal 8-yard rush (Evan Legasssey kick) (10 plays, 41 yards, 5:25) | TROY 38–10 |

| Statistics | Troy | Arkansas State |
|---|---|---|
| First downs | 27 | 21 |
| Total yards | 487 | 379 |
| Rushing yards | 68 | 108 |
| Passing yards | 419 | 271 |
| Turnovers | 0 | 1 |
| Time of possession | 33:10 | 26:50 |

| Team | Category | Player | Statistics |
|---|---|---|---|
| Troy | Passing | Jacob Free | 33/45, 419 yards, 2 TDs |
| Troy | Rushing | Kimani Vidal | 17 carries, 58 yards, 1 TD |
| Troy | Receiving | Kaylon Geiger | 8 receptions, 126 yards |
| Arkansas State | Passing | Layne Hatcher | 11/20, 166 yards, 1 TD |
| Arkansas State | Rushing | Lincoln Pare | 12 carries, 90 yards |
| Arkansas State | Receiving | Dahu Green | 4 receptions, 75 yards |

=== At Georgia Southern ===
Troy at Georgia Southern

| Team | 1 | 2 | 3 | 4 | Total |
|---|---|---|---|---|---|
| Trojans | 0 | 10 | 3 | 0 | 13 |
| • Eagles | 0 | 6 | 14 | 0 | 20 |

- Date: November 7, 2020
- Location: Paulson Stadium
  Statesboro, GA
- Game start: 2:05 p.m. CST
- Elapsed time: 3 hours and 15 minutes
- Game attendance: 5,012
- Referee: Jeremy Parker
- TV announcers (ESPN3): Matt Stewart (play–by–play) and Danny Waugh (analyst)

Scoring summary
| 2 | 10:18 | GASO | Alex Raynor 23-yard field goal (18 plays, 87 yards, 10:53) | GASO 3–0 |
| 2 | 09:25 | TROY | Dell Pettus 44-yard interception returned (Evan Legassey kick) (1 play, 0 yards, 0:16) | TROY 7–3 |
| 2 | 02:28 | GASO | Alex Raynor 35-yard field goal (12 play, 57 yards, 6:57) | TROY 7–6 |
| 2 | 01:05 | TROY | Evan Legassey 35-yard field goal (8 play, 48 yards, 1:18) | TROY 10–6 |
| 4 | 08:26 | TROY | Evan Legassey 20-yard field goal (8 play, 35 yards, 2:31) | TROY 13–6 |
| 4 | 07:37 | GASO | Gerald Green 69-yard rush (Alex Raynor kick) (2 play, 75 yards, 0:49) | TIE 13–13 |
| 4 | 02:18 | GASO | Shai Werts 5-yard rush (Alex Raynor kick) (8 play, 85 yards, 4:19) | GASO 20–13 |

| Statistics | Troy | Georgia Southern |
|---|---|---|
| First downs | 14 | 20 |
| Total yards | 235 | 411 |
| Rushing yards | 34 | 326 |
| Passing yards | 201 | 85 |
| Turnovers | 2 | 1 |
| Time of possession | 17:13 | 42:47 |

| Team | Category | Player | Statistics |
|---|---|---|---|
| Troy | Passing | Jacob Free | 21/47, 201 yards, 2 INTs |
| Troy | Rushing | Jamontez Woods | 3 carries, 23 yards |
| Troy | Receiving | Kaylon Geiger | 6 receptions, 49 yards |
| Georgia Southern | Passing | Shai Werts | 12/13, 85 yards, 1 INT |
| Georgia Southern | Rushing | Gerald Green | 10 carries, 109 yards, 1 TD |
| Georgia Southern | Receiving | NaJee Thompson | 1 reception, 35 yards |

=== Middle Tennessee ===
Middle Tennessee at Troy

| Team | 1 | 2 | 3 | 4 | Total |
|---|---|---|---|---|---|
| • Blue Raiders | 7 | 10 | 0 | 3 | 20 |
| Trojans | 3 | 7 | 0 | 7 | 17 |

- Date: November 21, 2020
- Location: Veterans Memorial Stadium
  Troy, AL
- Game start: 2:35 p.m. CST
- Elapsed time: 2 hours and 51 minutes
- Game attendance: 12,000
- Game weather: 72 °F (22 °C) • Weather: Partly Cloudy • Wind: S 5 MPH
- Referee: Marshall Lewis
- TV announcers (ESPN3): Will Kollmeyer (play–by–play) and Ben Stanfield (analyst)

Scoring summary
| 1 | 11:20 | TROY | Evan Legassey 33-yard field goal (10 plays, 68 yards, 3:40) | TROY 3–0 |
| 1 | 00:56 | MTSU | Chaton Mobley 4-yard rush (Crews Holt kick) (11 plays, 66 yards, 5:09) | MTSU 7–3 |
| 2 | 07:45 | MTSU | Frank Pleseant 5-yard rush (Crews Holt kick); 11 plays, 71 yards, 5:09) | MTSU 14–3 |
| 2 | 04:29 | TROY | B. J. Smith 2-yard rush (Evan Legassey kick); 7 plays, 70 yards, 3:16) | MTSU 14–10 |
| 2 | 00:17 | MTSU | Crews Holt 22-yard field goal (13 plays, 70 yards, 4:12) | MTSU 17–10 |
| 4 | 02:37 | MTSU | Crews Holt 49-yard field goal (10 plays, 51 yards, 5:20) | MTSU 20–10 |
| 4 | 00:28 | TROY | Khalil McClain 8-yard pass from Gunnar Watson (Evan Legassey kick) (11 plays, 85 yards, 2:09) | MTSU 20–17 |

| Statistics | Middle Tennessee | Troy |
|---|---|---|
| First downs | 23 | 18 |
| Total yards | 396 | 392 |
| Rushing yards | 186 | 92 |
| Passing yards | 210 | 300 |
| Turnovers | 0 | 2 |
| Time of possession | 37:21 | 22:39 |

| Team | Category | Player | Statistics |
|---|---|---|---|
| Middle Tennessee | Passing | Asher O'Hara | 19/23, 210 yards |
| Middle Tennessee | Rushing | Asher O'Hara | 25 carries, 86 yards |
| Middle Tennessee | Receiving | Yusuf Ali | 7 receptions, 90 yards |
| Troy | Passing | Gunnar Watson | 25/39, 300 yards, TD, 2 INTs |
| Troy | Rushing | B. J. Smith | 10 carries, 62 yards, 1 TD |
| Troy | Receiving | Khalil McClain | 6 receptions, 92 yards, 1 TD |

=== At Appalachian State ===
Troy at Appalachian State

| Team | 1 | 2 | 3 | 4 | Total |
|---|---|---|---|---|---|
| Trojans | 0 | 10 | 0 | 0 | 10 |
| • Mountaineers | 21 | 13 | 13 | 0 | 47 |

- Date: November 28, 2020
- Location: Kidd Brewer Stadium
  Boone, NC
- Game start: 2:30 p.m. CST
- Elapsed time: 3 hours and 6 minutes
- Game attendance: 2,100
- Game weather: 54 °F (12 °C) • Weather: Sunny and Clear • Wind: Light
- Referee: Jeremy Parker
- TV announcers (ESPN2): Bill Roth (play–by–play) and Dustin Fox (analyst)

Scoring summary
| 1 | 12:16 | APP | Camerun Peoples 63-yard rush (Chandler Staton kick) (3 plays, 72 yards, 0:50) | APP 7–0 |
| 1 | 07:58 | APP | Malik Williams 15-yard pass from Zac Thomas (Chandler Staton kick) (6 plays, 71 yards, 2:21) | APP 14–0 |
| 1 | 07:09 | APP | Steven Jones 34-yard interception returned (Chandler Staton kick) (3 plays, 6 yards, 0:49) | APP 21–0 |
| 2 | 14:56 | APP | Thomas Hennigan 22-yard pass from Zac Thomas (Chandler Staton kick) (12 plays, 97 yards, 5:05) | APP 28–0 |
| 2 | 08:36 | TROY | Evan Legassey 27-yard field goal (13 plays, 66 yards, 6:20) | APP 28–3 |
| 2 | 05:32 | APP | Chandler Staton 42-yard field goal (9 plays, 35 yards, 2:58) | APP 31–3 |
| 2 | 04:35 | TROY | Kaylon Geiger 33-yard pass from Gunnar Watson (Evan Legassey kick) (4 plays, 85 yards, 0:57) | APP 31–10 |
| 2 | 07:58 | APP | Chandler Staton 30-yard field goal (15 plays, 62 yards, 4:32) | APP 34–10 |
| 3 | 06:02 | APP | Henry Pearson 6-yard pass from Zac Thomas (Chandler Staton PAT failed) (10 plays, 75 yards, 5:24) | APP 40–10 |
| 3 | 00:17 | APP | Caleb Spurlin 2-yard pass from Zac Thomas (Chandler Staton kick) (7 plays, 75 yards, 3:58) | APP 47–10 |

| Statistics | Troy | Appalachian State |
|---|---|---|
| First downs | 13 | 26 |
| Total yards | 231 | 554 |
| Rushing yards | 106 | 275 |
| Passing yards | 125 | 279 |
| Turnovers | 1 | 3 |
| Time of possession | 29:39 | 30:21 |

| Team | Category | Player | Statistics |
|---|---|---|---|
| Troy | Passing | Gunnar Watson | 13/20, 125 yards, 1 TD, 1 INT |
| Troy | Rushing | Jamontez Woods | 10 carries, 43 yards |
| Troy | Receiving | Kaylon Geiger | 3 receptions, 41 yards, 1 TD |
| Appalachian State | Passing | Zac Thomas | 22/29, 279 yards, 4 TDs |
| Appalachian State | Rushing | Camerun Peoples | 10 carries, 95 yards, 1 TD |
| Appalachian State | Receiving | Malik Williams | 7 receptions, 113 yards, 1 TD |

=== At South Alabama ===
Troy at South Alabama

| Team | 1 | 2 | 3 | 4 | Total |
|---|---|---|---|---|---|
| • Trojans | 3 | 24 | 0 | 2 | 29 |
| Jaguars | 0 | 0 | 0 | 0 | 0 |

- Date: December 5, 2020
- Location: Hancock Whitney Stadium
  Mobile, AL
- Game start: 1:00 p.m. CST
- Elapsed time: 2 hours and 52 minutes
- Game attendance: 5,375
- Game weather: 58 °F (14 °C) • Weather: Sunny • Wind: NNE 6 MPH
- Referee: Marshall Lewis
- TV announcers (ESPN3): J. D. Byars (play–by–play) and Pat Greenwood (analyst)

Scoring summary
| 1 | 06:02 | TROY | Evan Legassey 22-yard field goal (13 plays, 56 yards, 4:17) | TROY 3–0 |
| 2 | 11:06 | TROY | Khalil McClain 15-yard pass from Gunnar Watson (Evan Legassey kick) (10 plays, 89 yards, 3:48) | TROY 10–0 |
| 2 | 09:26 | TROY | Kaylon Geiger 15-yard pass from Gunnar Watson (Evan Legassey kick) (3 plays, 28 yards, 0:40) | TROY 17–0 |
| 2 | 03:56 | TROY | Tray Eafford 21-yard pass from Gunnar Watson (Evan Legassey kick) (8 plays, 68 yards, 2:51) | TROY 24–0 |
| 2 | 00:08 | TROY | Evan Legassey 44-yard field goal (4 plays, 29 yards, 0:23) | TROY 27–0 |
| 4 | 07:02 | TROY | Team Safety (3 plays, -7 yards, 0:54) | TROY 29–0 |

| Statistics | Troy | South Alabama |
|---|---|---|
| First downs | 25 | 17 |
| Total yards | 414 | 239 |
| Rushing yards | 117 | 57 |
| Passing yards | 297 | 182 |
| Turnovers | 1 | 2 |
| Time of possession | 31:47 | 28:13 |

| Team | Category | Player | Statistics |
|---|---|---|---|
| Troy | Passing | Gunnar Watson | 34/41, 297 yards, 3 TDs |
| Troy | Rushing | Kimani Vidal | 22 carries, 76 yards |
| Troy | Receiving | Tray Eafford | 4 receptions, 67 yards, 1 TD |
| South Alabama | Passing | Desmond Trotter | 15/28, 144 yards, 1 INT |
| South Alabama | Rushing | Caullin Lacy | 4 carries, 38 yards |
| South Alabama | Receiving | Jalen Tolbert | 5 receptions, 92 yards |

=== Coastal Carolina ===
Coastal Carolina at Troy

| Team | 1 | 2 | 3 | 4 | Total |
|---|---|---|---|---|---|
| • No. 13 Chanticleers | 14 | 7 | 7 | 14 | 42 |
| Trojans | 3 | 13 | 7 | 15 | 38 |

- Date: December 12, 2020
- Location: Veterans Memorial Stadium
  Troy, AL
- Game start: 2:05 p.m. CST
- Elapsed time: 3 hours and 30 minutes
- Game attendance: 11,000
- Game weather: 72 °F (22 °C) • Weather: Cloudy • Wind: N 11 MPH
- Referee: Wayne Winkler
- TV announcers (ESPN+): Will Kollmeyer (play–by–play) and Ben Stanfield (analyst)

Scoring summary
| 1 | 13:48 | CCU | C. J. Marable 59-yard rush (Massimo Biscardi kick) (3 plays, 75 yards, 1:12) | CCU 7–0 |
| 1 | 08:22 | CCU | C. J. Marable 20-yard pass from Grayson McCall (Massimo Biscardi kick) (9 plays, 90 yards, 4:18) | CCU 14–0 |
| 1 | 04:02 | TROY | Evan Legassey 42-yard field goal (14 plays, 45 yards, 4:20) | CCU 14–3 |
| 2 | 12:26 | TROY | Kimani Vidal 4-yard rush (Evan Legassey kick) (13 plays, 87 yards, 3:51) | CCU 14–10 |
| 2 | 05:27 | TROY | Evan Legassey 28-yard field goal (14 plays, 79 yards, 5:28) | CCU 14–13 |
| 2 | 01:38 | CCU | C. J. Marable 2-yard rush (Massimo Biscardi kick) (8 plays, 75 yards, 3:49) | CCU 21–13 |
| 2 | 00:00 | TROY | Evan Legassey 23-yard field goal (8 plays, 66 yards, 1:38) | CCU 21–16 |
| 3 | 04:33 | CCU | Jaivon Heiligh 6-yard pass from Grayson McCall (Massimo Biscardi kick) (16 plays, 83 yards, 9:48) | CCU 28–16 |
| 3 | 03:18 | TROY | Reggie Todd 41-yard pass from Gunnar Watson (Evan Legassey kick) (4 plays, 69 yards, 1:15) | CCU 28–23 |
| 4 | 05:03 | CCU | Grayson McCall 2-yard rush (Massimo Biscardi kick) (4 plays, 4 yards, 2:18) | CCU 35–23 |
| 4 | 02:48 | TROY | Jamontez Woods 3-yard rush (Evan Legassey kick) (11 plays, 75 yards, 2:15) | CCU 35–30 |
| 4 | 01:20 | TROY | Tray Eafford 6-yard pass from Jacob Free (Jacob Free two-point conversion pass to Khalil McClain) (7 plays, 40 yards, 1:11) | TROY 38–35 |
| 4 | 00:35 | CCU | Jaivon Heiligh 23-yard pass from Grayson McCall (Massimo Biscardi kick) (5 plays, 75 yards, 0:45) | CCU 42–38 |

| Statistics | Coastal Carolina | Troy |
|---|---|---|
| First downs | 29 | 29 |
| Total yards | 514 | 443 |
| Rushing yards | 176 | 89 |
| Passing yards | 338 | 354 |
| Turnovers | 1 | 3 |
| Time of possession | 36:28 | 23:32 |

| Team | Category | Player | Statistics |
|---|---|---|---|
| Coastal Carolina | Passing | Grayson McCall | 24/29, 338 yards, 3 TDs, 1 INT |
| Coastal Carolina | Rushing | C. J. Marable | 20 carries, 120 yards, 2 TDs |
| Coastal Carolina | Receiving | Jaivon Heiligh | 11 receptions, 138 yards, 2 TDs |
| Troy | Passing | Gunnar Watson | 25/37, 260 yards, 1 TD, 1 INT |
| Troy | Rushing | Jamontez Woods | 9 carries, 49 yards, 1 TD |
| Troy | Receiving | Kaylon Geiger | 9 receptions, 103 yards |
