= Patrick Toney =

American football coach (born 1990)

Atlanta Falcons
- Title: Defensive pass game coordinator

Personal information
- Born: March 14, 1990 (age 36); San Diego, California, U.S.

Career history
- Fallbrook HS (CA) (2008) Defensive line coach; Palomar (2009) Wide receivers coach; La Costa Canyon HS (CA) (2010–2011) Offensive coordinator; Southeastern Louisiana (2012–2014); Defensive assistant (2012–2013); Defensive backs coach & special teams coordinator (2014); Sam Houston State (2015) Safeties coach; UTSA (2016–2017) Safeties coach; Louisiana (2018–2021); Safeties coach (2018–2019); Defensive coordinator & outside linebackers coach (2020–2021); Florida (2022) Co-defensive coordinator & safeties coach; Arizona Cardinals (2023–2025) Defensive backs coach; Atlanta Falcons (2026–present) Defensive pass game coordinator

Patrick Toney (born March 14, 1990) is an American professional football coach who is the defensive pass game coordinator for the Atlanta Falcons of the National Football League (NFL). He previously served as the defensive backs coach for the Arizona Cardinals from 2023 to 2025.

Toney served as co-defensive coordinator for the Florida Gators football team.

== Coaching career ==
=== Sam Houston State ===
In 2015, Toney worked as the safeties coach at Sam Houston State.

=== UTSA ===
Toney spent 2016 and 2017 as the safeties coach at UTSA.

=== Louisiana ===
In 2018 Toney joined the Ragin Cajuns as the safeties coach. In 2020 he was promoted to defensive coordinator and outside linebackers coach.

=== Florida ===
On December 6, 2021, Toney rejoined Napier and was hired as co-defensive coordinator and safeties coach for Florida.

=== Arizona Cardinals ===
On February 22, 2023, Toney was hired as the safeties coach for the Arizona Cardinals under new head coach, Jonathan Gannon. Following the 2025 season and the firing of Gannon, Toney was not retained by the Cardinals.

=== Atlanta Falcons ===
On March 9, 2026, Toney was hired by Atlanta Falcons as their defensive passing game coordinator under new head coach, Kevin Stefanski.
