= Dontae Fleming =

American football player (born 2001)

No. 38 – New York Giants
- Position: Wide receiver
- Roster status: Practice squad

Personal information
- Born: November 28, 2001 (age 24); LaPlace, Louisiana, U.S.
- Listed height: 6 ft 2 in (1.88 m)
- Listed weight: 180 lb (82 kg)

Career information
- High school: East St. John (Reserve, Louisiana)
- College: Louisiana (2020–2022); Tulane (2023–2024)
- NFL draft: 2025: undrafted

Career history
- Minnesota Vikings (2025–2026)*; New York Giants (2026–present)*
- * Offseason or practice squad member only
- Stats at Pro Football Reference

Dontae Fleming (born November 28, 2001) is an American professional football wide receiver for the New York Giants of the National Football League (NFL). He played college football for the Louisiana Ragin' Cajuns and Tulane Green Wave.

== College career ==
Fleming played college football for the Louisiana Ragin' Cajuns from 2020 to 2022 and the Tulane Green Wave from 2023 to 2024. In his three seasons at Louisiana catching 58 passes, for 680 yards and six touchdowns. After transferring to Tulane in 2023, Fleming played in 26 games, registering 37 receptions, 692 yards and one touchdown.

=== Statistics ===
Year	Team	Games		Receiving				Rushing			
Year	Team	GP	GS	Rec	Yds	Avg	TD	Att	Yds	Avg	TD
2020	Louisiana	9	1	12	190	15.8	1	1	-5	-5.0	0
2021	Louisiana	13	1	27	322	11.9	2	0	0	0	0
2022	Louisiana	12	0	19	168	8.8	3	0	0	0	0
2023	Tulane	12	1	6	94	15.7	0	0	0	0	0
2024	Tulane	14	14	31	598	19.3	1	3	21	7.0	0
Career		59	17	95	1,372	14.4	7	4	16	4.0	0

== Professional career ==
Pre-draft measurables
Height	Weight	Arm length	Hand span	Wingspan	40-yard dash	10-yard split	20-yard split	20-yard shuttle	Three-cone drill	Vertical jump	Broad jump	Bench press
6 ft 0 5/8 in (1.84 m)	175 lb (79 kg)	31 in (0.79 m)	9 5/8 in (0.24 m)	6 ft 4 3/8 in (1.94 m)	4.44 s	1.57 s	2.62 s	4.38 s	7.07 s	33.5 in (0.85 m)	10 ft 2 in (3.10 m)	14 reps
All values from Pro Day

=== Minnesota Vikings ===
After not being selected in the 2025 NFL draft, Fleming signed with the Minnesota Vikings as an undrafted free agent. On August 26, 2025, he was waived by the team but was signed to the practice squad the following day.

Fleming signed a reserve/future contract with Minnesota on January 5, 2026. On August 30, he was placed on injured reserve by the Vikings as part of the final roster cuts. On September 3, Fleming was waived by Minnesota with an injury settlement.

=== New York Giants ===
On September 22, 2026, Fleming worked out for the New York Giants. On October 6, Fleming once again worked out and signed to the Giants practice squad, following a season ending injury to Braxton Berrios.
