= Max Mitchell =

American football player (born 1999)

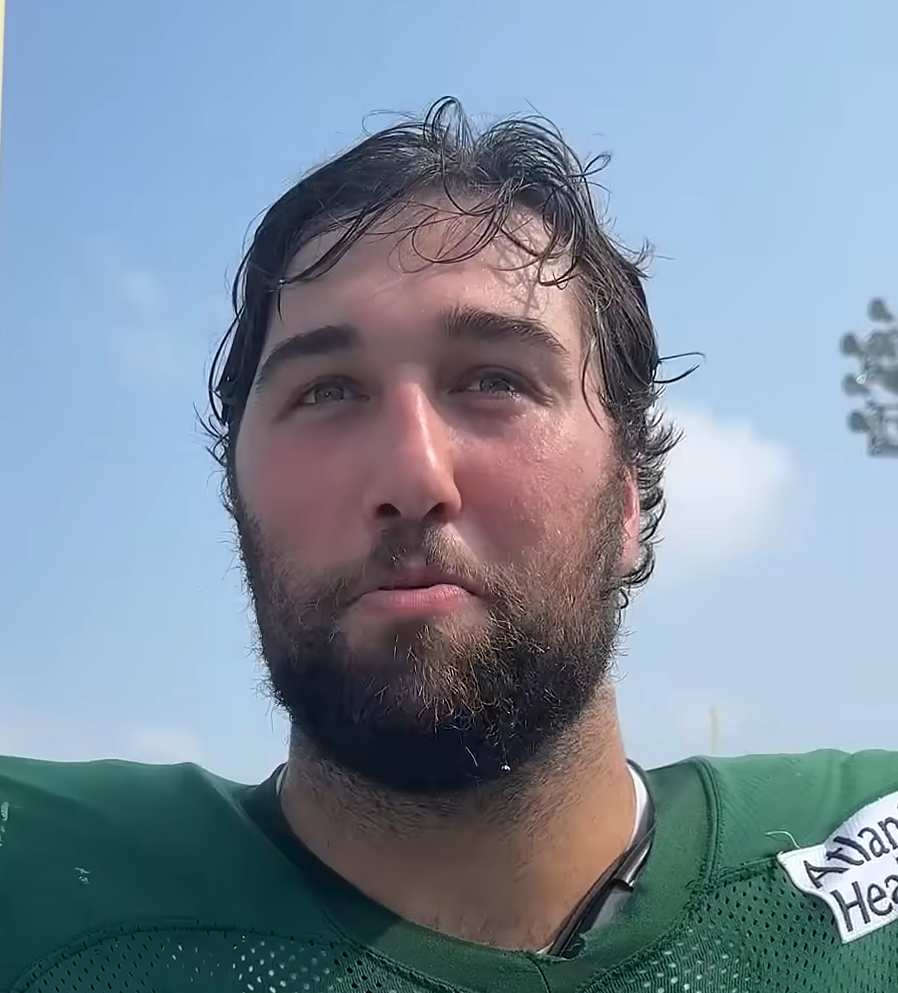
- Mitchell with the New York Jets in 2025

No. 61 – New York Jets
- Position: Offensive tackle
- Roster status: Injured reserve

Personal information
- Born: October 12, 1999 (age 27); Monroe, Louisiana, U.S.
- Listed height: 6 ft 6 in (1.98 m)
- Listed weight: 307 lb (139 kg)

Career information
- High school: Neville (Monroe)
- College: Louisiana (2018–2021)
- NFL draft: 2022: 4th round, 111th overall pick

Career history
- New York Jets (2022–present)

Awards and highlights
- Third-team All-American (2021); First-team All-Sun Belt (2021); Second-team All-Sun Belt (2020)

Career NFL statistics as of 2025
- Games played: 45
- Games started: 17
- Stats at Pro Football Reference

Max Mitchell (born October 12, 1999) is an American professional football offensive tackle for the New York Jets of the National Football League (NFL). He played college football for the Louisiana Ragin' Cajuns.

== Early life ==
Mitchell grew up in Monroe, Louisiana and attended Neville High School. Mitchell was rated a two-star recruit and committed to play college football at Louisiana over offers from lower-division schools Northwestern State, Arkansas-Monticello, Millsaps, and Ouachita Baptist.

== College career ==
Mitchell played in all 14 of the Ragin' Cajuns' games as a freshman. He was named a starter going into his sophomore year and started every game for Louisiana. Mitchell started at both left and right tackle as a junior and was named second-team All-Sun Belt Conference. As a senior, he was named first-team All-Sun Belt and a third-team All-American by the Associated Press. After the season, Mitchell received invitations to play in the Senior Bowl and participate in the NFL Combine.

== Professional career ==
Pre-draft measurables
Height	Weight	Arm length	Hand span	Wingspan	40-yard dash	10-yard split	20-yard split	20-yard shuttle	Three-cone drill	Vertical jump	Broad jump	Bench press
6 ft 6 1/4 in (1.99 m)	307 lb (139 kg)	33 1/2 in (0.85 m)	10 in (0.25 m)	6 ft 8 3/8 in (2.04 m)	5.30 s	1.89 s	3.01 s	4.65 s	8.09 s	25.0 in (0.64 m)	8 ft 10 in (2.69 m)	21 reps
All values from NFL Combine/Pro Day

Mitchell was selected in the fourth round, pick 111, of the 2022 NFL draft by the New York Jets. He was named the Jets starting right tackle to begin the season. He started the first four games before suffering a knee injury in Week 4. He was placed on injured reserve on October 8, 2022. He was activated on November 26. He was placed on the non-football injury list on December 7.

On March 13, 2026, Mitchell re-signed with the Jets on a one-year, $2 million contract.
