= Trey Ragas =

American football player (born 1996)

Profile
- Position: Running back

Personal information
- Born: November 7, 1996 (age 30); New Orleans, Louisiana, U.S.
- Listed height: 5 ft 10 in (1.78 m)
- Listed weight: 214 lb (97 kg)

Career information
- High school: Archbishop Shaw (LA)
- College: Louisiana
- NFL draft: 2021: undrafted

Career history
- Las Vegas Raiders (2021); Los Angeles Rams (2022)*; Hamilton Tiger-Cats (2023)*
- * Offseason or practice squad member only

Awards and highlights
- Second-team All-Sun Belt (2020)

Career NFL statistics
- Games played: 1
- Rushing yards: 9
- Rushing average: 9.0
- Receptions: 2
- Receiving yards: 6
- Stats at Pro Football Reference

Trey Ragas (born November 7, 1996) is an American professional football running back. He played college football for the Louisiana Ragin' Cajuns.

== Professional career ==
Pre-draft measurables
Height	Weight	Arm length	Hand span	40-yard dash	10-yard split	20-yard split	20-yard shuttle	Three-cone drill	Vertical jump	Broad jump	Bench press
5 ft 10 1/8 in (1.78 m)	218 lb (99 kg)	29 3/4 in (0.76 m)	8 7/8 in (0.23 m)	4.60 s	1.65 s	2.64 s	4.50 s	7.15 s	33.5 in (0.85 m)	9 ft 9 in (2.97 m)	23 reps
All values from Pro Day

=== Las Vegas Raiders ===
Ragas signed with the Las Vegas Raiders as an undrafted free agent in 2021. He was waived on August 31, 2021, and re-signed to the practice squad the next day. He was promoted to the active roster on September 25, 2021. He was waived on September 27 and re-signed to the practice squad. Ragas made his NFL debut on December 12, 2021, in a game against the Kansas City Chiefs, collecting 15 yards on three totes. After the Raiders were eliminated in the 2021 Wild Card round of the playoffs, Ragas signed a reserve/future contract on January 17, 2022. He was waived on May 5, 2022.

=== Los Angeles Rams ===
On July 29, 2022, Ragas signed with the Los Angeles Rams. He was waived on August 30, 2022, and signed to the practice squad the next day. He was placed on the practice squad/injured list on September 15, 2022. He was released from the practice squad on September 22, 2022.

=== Hamilton Tiger-Cats ===
On May 5, 2023, Ragas signed with the Hamilton Tiger-Cats of the Canadian Football League (CFL). On June 3, 2023, Ragas was released by the Tiger-Cats.
