= 2020 Coastal Carolina Chanticleers football team =

American college football season

2020 Coastal Carolina Chanticleers football

Sun Belt co-champion Sun Belt East Division champion

Cure Bowl, L 34–37^{OT} vs. Liberty
- Conference: Sun Belt Conference
- East Division

Ranking
- Coaches: No. 14
- AP: No. 14
- Record: 11–1 (8–0 Sun Belt)
- Head coach: Jamey Chadwell (3rd season)
- Co-offensive coordinators: Newland Isaac (2nd season); Willy Korn (2nd season)
- Offensive scheme: Up-tempo spread
- Defensive coordinator: Chad Staggs (2nd season)
- Base defense: 4–2–5
- Home stadium: Brooks Stadium

2020 Sun Belt Conference football standings
| | Conf. | | | Overall |
| Team | W | | L | W | | L |
|---|---|---|---|---|---|---|
East Division
| No. 14 Coastal Carolina xy+ | 8 | – | 0 | 11 | – | 1 |
| Appalachian State | 6 | – | 2 | 9 | – | 3 |
| Georgia Southern | 4 | – | 4 | 8 | – | 5 |
| Georgia State | 4 | – | 4 | 6 | – | 4 |
| Troy | 3 | – | 4 | 5 | – | 6 |
West Division
| No. 15 Louisiana xy+ | 7 | – | 1 | 10 | – | 1 |
| South Alabama | 3 | – | 5 | 4 | – | 7 |
| Arkansas State | 2 | – | 6 | 4 | – | 7 |
| Texas State | 2 | – | 6 | 2 | – | 10 |
| Louisiana–Monroe | 0 | – | 7 | 0 | – | 10 |
Championship: Louisiana at Coastal Carolina (Canceled)
+ – Conference co-champions; x – Division champion/co-champions; y – Championship game participant; Rankings from AP Poll

The 2020 Coastal Carolina Chanticleers football team represented Coastal Carolina University as a member of the East Division of the Sun Belt Conference during the 2020 NCAA Division I FBS football season. Led by third-year head coach Jamey Chadwell, the Chanticleers compiled an overall record of 11–1 with a mark of 8–0 in conference play, winning the Sun Belt East Division title. Coastal Carolina was scheduled to play Louisiana, champion of the Sun Belt's West Division, in the Sun Belt Conference Football Championship Game on December 19, but the game was cancelled, and two teams were declared co-champions of the conference. The Chanticleers were invited to the Cure Bowl, where they lost in overtime to Liberty. Coastal Carolina played home games at Brooks Stadium in Conway, South Carolina.

== Schedule ==
Coastal Carolina had games against Duquesne, Eastern Michigan, and South Carolina, which were canceled due to the COVID-19 pandemic. These were partially replaced with games against Campbell and Liberty. On December 3, due to COVID-19 issues in the Liberty football program, the game against Liberty was canceled and replaced with BYU.

| Date | Time | Opponent | Rank | Site | TV | Result | Attendance | Source |
|---|---|---|---|---|---|---|---|---|
| September 12 | 10:00 p.m. | at Kansas* | | David Booth Kansas Memorial Stadium; Lawrence, KS | FS1 | W 38–23 | 0 | |
| September 18 | 7:30 p.m. | Campbell* | | Brooks Stadium; Conway, SC | ESPN | W 43–21 | 5,000 | |
| October 3 | 12:00 p.m. | Arkansas State | | Brooks Stadium; Conway, SC | ESPN2 | W 52–23 | 5,000 | |
| October 14 | 7:30 p.m. | at No. 21 Louisiana | | Cajun Field; Lafayette, LA | ESPN | W 30–27 | 5,585 | |
| October 24 | 12:00 p.m. | Georgia Southern | No. 25 | Brooks Stadium; Conway, SC | ESPNU | W 28–14 | 5,000 | |
| October 31 | 12:00 p.m. | at Georgia State | No. 20 | Center Parc Stadium; Atlanta, GA | ESPNU | W 51–0 | 3,642 | |
| November 7 | 8:00 p.m. | South Alabama^{†} | No. 15 | Brooks Stadium; Conway, SC | ESPNU | W 23–6 | 5,000 | |
| November 21 | 12:00 p.m. | Appalachian State | No. 15 | Brooks Stadium; Conway, SC | ESPN | W 34–23 | 5,000 | |
| November 28 | 3:00 p.m. | at Texas State | No. 20 | Bobcat Stadium; San Marcos, TX | ESPN+ | W 49–14 | 3,245 | |
| December 5 | 2:00 p.m. | No. 13 BYU* | No. 18 | Brooks Stadium; Conway, SC (College GameDay) | ESPNU | W 22–17 | 5,000 | |
| December 12 | 3:00 p.m. | at Troy | No. 13 | Veterans Memorial Stadium; Troy, AL | ESPN+ | W 42–38 | 11,000 | |
| December 19 | 3:30 p.m. | No. 19 Louisiana | No. 12 | Brooks Stadium; Conway, SC (Sun Belt Championship Game) | ESPN | No contest | | |
| December 26 | 7:30 p.m. | vs. Liberty* | No. 12 | Camping World Stadium; Orlando, FL (Cure Bowl, rivalry) | ESPN | L 34–37 ^{OT} | 4,488 | |
*Non-conference game; ^{†}Homecoming; Rankings from AP Poll and CFP Rankings after November 24 released prior to game; All times are in Eastern time

== Rankings ==
Ranking movements Legend: ██ Increase in ranking ██ Decrease in ranking — = Not ranked RV = Received votes т = Tied with team above or below
| | Week | | | | | | | | | | | | | | | | | |
| Poll | Pre | 1 | 2 | 3 | 4 | 5 | 6 | 7 | 8 | 9 | 10 | 11 | 12 | 13 | 14 | 15 | 16 | Final |
|---|---|---|---|---|---|---|---|---|---|---|---|---|---|---|---|---|---|---|
| AP | — | —* | — | RV | — | RV | RV | 25 | 20 | 15 | 15 | 15 T | 16 | 14 | 11 | 9 | 9 | 14 |
| Coaches | — | —* | RV | RV | RV | RV | RV | 24 | 21 | 16 | 17 | 18 | 17 | 14 | 13 | 12 | 11 | 14 |
| CFP | Not released | | | | | | | | | | | | 20 | 18 | 13 | 12 | 12 | Not released |

== Game summaries ==
=== At Kansas ===
Coastal Carolina at Kansas

| Team | 1 | 2 | 3 | 4 | Total |
|---|---|---|---|---|---|
| • Chanticleers | 14 | 14 | 0 | 10 | 38 |
| Jayhawks | 0 | 3 | 14 | 6 | 23 |

- Date: September 12, 2020
- Location: David Booth Kansas Memorial Stadium
  Lawrence, KS
- Game start: 10:00 p.m. EDT
- Elapsed time: 3 hours and 28 minutes
- Game attendance: None due to COVID-19
- Game weather: 68 °F (20 °C) • Weather: Clear • Wind: NNW 6 MPH
- Referee: Kyle Olson
- TV announcers (Fox Sports 1): Tim Brando (play–by–play) and Spencer Tillman (analyst)

Scoring summary
| 1 | 6:22 | CCU | Grayson McCall 12 yard run (Massimo Biscardi kick) (10 plays, 62 yards, 5:17) | 7–0 CCU |
| 1 | 2:37 | CCU | C. J. Brewer 2 yard pass from Grayson McCall (Massimo Biscardi kick) (6 plays, 26 yards, 2:58) | 14–0 CCU |
| 2 | 10:57 | CCU | Isaiah Likely 2 yard pass from Grayson McCall (Massimo Biscardi kick) (7 plays, 89 yards, 3:07) | 21–0 CCU |
| 2 | 0:55 | CCU | Jaivon Heiligh 25 yard pass from Grayson McCall (Massimo Biscardi kick) (4 plays, 36 yards, 1:15) | 28–0 CCU |
| 2 | 0:00 | KU | Jacob Borcila 47 yard field goal (7 plays, 29 yards, 0:49) | 28–3 CCU |
| 3 | 2:29 | KU | Andrew Parchment 14 yard pass from Miles Kendrick (Miles Kendrick pass to Kwamie Lassiter II for Two-point conversion) (15 plays, 89 yards, 8:12) | 28–11 CCU |
| 3 | 0:04 | KU | Velton Gardner 61 yard run (Two-point pass conversion failed) (3 plays, 72 yards, 1:09) | 28–17 CCU |
| 4 | 9:55 | CCU | Grayson McCall 2 yard run (Massimo Biscardi kick) (9 plays, 81 yards, 5:05) | 35–17 CCU |
| 4 | 7:00 | KU | Kwamie Lassiter II 5 yard pass from Miles Kendrick (Two-point pass conversion failed) (9 plays, 78 yards, 2:47) | 35–23 CCU |
| 4 | 1:13 | CCU | Massimo Biscardi 27 yard field goal (7 plays, 4 yards, 3:16) | 38–23 CCU |

| Line | Over/under |
|---|---|
| KU −7 | 56.5 |

| Statistics | Coastal Carolina | Kansas |
|---|---|---|
| First downs | 19 | 23 |
| Total yards | 318 | 367 |
| Rushing yards | 185 | 178 |
| Passing yards | 133 | 189 |
| Turnovers | 0 | 3 |
| Time of possession | 30:25 | 29:35 |

| Team | Category | Player | Statistics |
|---|---|---|---|
| Coastal Carolina | Passing | Grayson McCall | 11–18, 133 yards, 3 TD |
| Coastal Carolina | Rushing | C. J. Marable | 21 carries, 75 yards |
| Coastal Carolina | Receiving | Jaivon Heiligh | 3 receptions, 74 yards, 1 TD |
| Kansas | Passing | Miles Kendrick | 15–24, 156 yards, 2 TD, 1 INT |
| Kansas | Rushing | Velton Gardner | 11 carries, 81 yards, 1 TD |
| Kansas | Receiving | Kwamie Lassiter II | 5 receptions, 63 yards, 1 TD |

=== Campbell ===
Campbell at Coastal Carolina

| Team | 1 | 2 | 3 | 4 | Total |
|---|---|---|---|---|---|
| Camels | 0 | 9 | 0 | 12 | 21 |
| • Chanticleers | 14 | 7 | 7 | 15 | 43 |

- Date: September 18, 2020
- Location: Brooks Stadium
  Conway, SC
- Game start: 7:30 p.m. EDT
- Elapsed time: 3 hours and 19 minutes
- Game attendance: 5,000
- Game weather: 73 °F (23 °C) • Weather: Cloudy • Wind: N 9 MPH
- Referee: Marshall Lewis
- TV announcers (ESPN): Tom Hart (play–by–play), Andre Ware (analyst), and Cole Cubelic (sideline reporter)

Scoring summary
| 1 | 8:08 | CCU | C. J. Marable 2 yard run (Massimo Biscardi kick) (5 plays, 56 yards, 1:40) | CCU 7–0 |
| 1 | 0:34 | CCU | Shermari Jones 3-yard run (Massimo Biscardi kick) (9 plays, 62 yards, 4:24) | CCU 14–0 |
| 2 | 11:18 | CAMP | Robert Brown 45-yard field goal (9 plays, 47 yards, 4:16) | CCU 14–3 |
| 2 | 6:23 | CCU | Jaivon Heiligh 21-yard pass from Grayson McCall (Massimo Biscardi kick) (11 plays, 86 yards, 4:50) | CCU 21–3 |
| 2 | 0:59 | CAM | C. J. Freeman 9-yard run (McKay Taylor two-point conversion rush failed) (11 plays, 85 yards, 5:20) | CCU 21–9 |
| 3 | 6:02 | CCU | Reese White 3-yard run (Massimo Biscardi kick) (8 plays, 60 yards, 4:23) | CCU 28–9 |
| 4 | 14:57 | CAM | Bryant Barr 7-yard run (Hajj-Malik Williams two-point conversion pass failed) (13 plays, 75 yards, 6:05) | CCU 28–15 |
| 4 | 13:55 | CCU | C. J. Marable 9-yard run (Grayson McCall pass to Jaivon Heiligh for Two-point Conversion) (3 plays, 74 yards, 0:56) | CCU 36–15 |
| 4 | 11:42 | CCU | Isaiah Likely 57-yard pass from Grayson McCall (Massimo Biscardi kick) (1 play, 57 yards, 0:09) | CCU 43–15 |
| 4 | 3:02 | CAM | Hajj-Malik Williams 4-yard run (Robert Brown kick blocked) (14 plays, 72 yards, 5:29) | CCU 43–21 |

| Line | Over/under |
|---|---|
| CCU −26.5 | 54.5 |

| Statistics | Campbell | Coastal Carolina |
|---|---|---|
| First downs | 22 | 21 |
| Total yards | 342 | 466 |
| Rushing yards | 205 | 193 |
| Passing yards | 137 | 273 |
| Turnovers | 1 | 0 |
| Time of possession | 34:19 | 25:41 |

| Team | Category | Player | Statistics |
|---|---|---|---|
| Campbell | Passing | Hajj-Malik Williams | 12/25, 137 yards |
| Campbell | Rushing | C. J. Freeman | 14 carries, 83 yards |
| Campbell | Receiving | Bryant Barr | 3 receptions, 36 yards |
| Coastal Carolina | Passing | Grayson McCall | 11/16, 273 yards, 2 TDs |
| Coastal Carolina | Rushing | C. J. Marable | 11 carries, 51 yards |
| Coastal Carolina | Receiving | Isaiah Likely | 3 receptions, 96 yards, 1 TD |

=== Arkansas State ===
Arkansas State at Coastal Carolina

| Team | 1 | 2 | 3 | 4 | Total |
|---|---|---|---|---|---|
| Red Wolves | 14 | 0 | 0 | 9 | 23 |
| • Chanticleers | 7 | 17 | 7 | 21 | 52 |

- Date: October 3, 2020
- Location: Brooks Stadium
  Conway, SC
- Game start: 12:01 p.m. EDT
- Elapsed time: 3 hours and 35 minutes
- Game attendance: 5,000
- Game weather: • Weather: CLEAR • Wind: N 7 MPH
- Referee: Wayne Winkler
- TV announcers (ESPN2): Bill Roth (play–by–play), Rene Ingoglia (analyst), and Taylor Davis (sideline reporter)

Scoring summary
| 1 | 05:38 | ARST | Dahu Green 33-yard pass from Logan Bonner (Blake Grupe kick) (5 plays, 82 yards, 1:28) | ARST 7–0 |
| 1 | 05:26 | CCU | Isaiah Likely 72-yard pass from Grayson McCall (Massimo Biscardi kick) (1 play, 72 yards, 0:12) | TIE 7–7 |
| 1 | 02:30 | ARST | Brandon Bowling 21-yard pass from Logan Bonner (Blake Grupe kick) (3 plays, 27 yards, 0:52) | ARST 14–7 |
| 2 | 12:04 | CCU | C. J. Marable 12-yard rush (Massimo Biscardi kick) (10 plays, 75 yards, 5:26) | TIE 14–14 |
| 2 | 10:28 | CCU | Massimo Biscardi 42-yard field goal (4 plays, 6 yards, 1:35) | CCU 17–14 |
| 2 | 00:58 | CCU | C. J. Marable 3-yard pass from Grayson McCall (Massimo Biscardi kick) (18 plays, 94 yards, 8:38) | CCU 24–14 |
| 3 | 06:57 | CCU | Kameron Brown 3-yard pass from Grayson McCall (Massimo Biscardi kick) (14 plays, 83 yards, 7:57) | CCU 31–14 |
| 4 | 14:05 | ARST | Blake Grupe 42-yard field goal (8 plays, 45 yards, 2:32) | CCU 31–17 |
| 4 | 10:29 | CCU | Jaivon Heiligh 6-yard pass from Grayson McCall (Massimo Biscardi kick) (8 plays, 69 yards, 3:30) | CCU 38–17 |
| 4 | 06:16 | CCU | Shermari Jones 15-yard rush (Massimo Biscardi kick) (5 plays, 52 yards, 2:20) | CCU 45–17 |
| 4 | 05:07 | ARST | Brandon Bowling 44-yard pass from Layne Hatcher (Blake Grupe PAT blocked) (5 plays, 73 yards, 1:04) | CCU 45–23 |
| 4 | 04:12 | CCU | Braydon Bennett 35-yard rush (Massimo Biscardi kick) (2 plays, 44 yards, 0:54) | CCU 52–23 |

| Line | Over/under |
|---|---|
| ARST −3.5 | 64.5 |

| Statistics | Arkansas State | Coastal Carolina |
|---|---|---|
| First downs | 15 | 25 |
| Total yards | 385 | 539 |
| Rushing yards | 36 | 217 |
| Passing yards | 349 | 322 |
| Turnovers | 2 | 3 |
| Time of possession | 18:39 | 41:21 |

| Team | Category | Player | Statistics |
|---|---|---|---|
| Arkansas State | Passing | Layne Hatcher | 12/23, 184 yards, 1 TD, 1 INT |
| Arkansas State | Rushing | Lincoln Pare | 6 carries, 18 yards |
| Arkansas State | Receiving | Brandon Bowling | 7 receptions, 115 yards, 2 TDs |
| Coastal Carolina | Passing | Grayson McCall | 20/29, 322 yards, 4 TDs, 1 INT |
| Coastal Carolina | Rushing | C. J. Marable | 15 carries, 63 yards, 1 TD |
| Coastal Carolina | Receiving | Jaivon Heiligh | 7 receptions, 93 yards, 1 TD |

=== At Louisiana ===
Coastal Carolina at Louisiana

| Team | 1 | 2 | 3 | 4 | Total |
|---|---|---|---|---|---|
| • Chanticleers | 7 | 6 | 7 | 10 | 30 |
| No. 21 Ragin' Cajuns | 7 | 6 | 7 | 7 | 27 |

- Date: October 14, 2020
- Location: Cajun Field
  Lafayette, LA
- Game start: 6:35 p.m. EDT
- Elapsed time: 3 hours and 21 minutes
- Game attendance: 5,585
- Game weather: 81 °F (27 °C) • Weather: Clear • Wind: SSW 4 MPH
- Referee: Jeremy Parker
- TV announcers (ESPN): Chris Cotter (play–by–play), Eric MacLain (analyst), Lericia Harris (sideline reporter)

Scoring summary
| 1 | 10:04 | LA | Jalen Williams 12-yard pass from Levi Lewis (Nate Snyder kick) (10 plays, 75 yards, 4:56) | LA 7–0 |
| 1 | 04:49 | CCU | C. J. Marable 1-yard rush (Massimo Biscardi kick) (10 plays, 75 yards, 5:15) | TIE 7–7 |
| 2 | 04:28 | CCU | C. J. Marable 13-yard pass from Grayson McCall (Massimo Biscardi PAT failed) (7 plays, 84 yards, 3:39) | CCU 13–7 |
| 2 | 00:05 | LA | Levi Lewis 8-yard rush (Nate Snyder PAT failed) (9 plays, 77 yards, 0:58) | TIE 13–13 |
| 3 | 06:48 | CCU | Jaivon Heiligh 6-yard pass from Grayson McCall (Massimo Biscardi kick) (16 plays, 75 yards, 8:12) | CCU 20–13 |
| 3 | 03:47 | LA | Elijah Mitchell 9-yard rush (Nate Snyder kick) (7 plays, 66 yards, 3:01) | TIE 20–20 |
| 4 | 14:12 | CCU | Grayson McCall 3-yard rush (Massimo Biscardi kick); 3 plays, 26 yards, 0:55) | CCU 27–20 |
| 4 | 12:44 | LA | Elijah Mitchell 1-yard rush (Nate Snyder kick) (4 plays, 55 yards, 1:28) | TIE 27–27 |
| 4 | 00:04 | CCU | Massimo Biscardi 40-yard field goal (11 plays, 61 yards, 5:26) | CCU 30–27 |

| Line | Over/under |
|---|---|
| LA −8 | 58.5 |

| Statistics | Coastal Carolina | Louisiana |
|---|---|---|
| First downs | 23 | 19 |
| Total yards | 414 | 413 |
| Rushing yards | 212 | 240 |
| Passing yards | 202 | 173 |
| Turnovers | 0 | 1 |
| Time of possession | 38:11 | 21:49 |

| Team | Category | Player | Statistics |
|---|---|---|---|
| Coastal Carolina | Passing | Grayson McCall | 17/24, 202 yards, 2 TDs |
| Coastal Carolina | Rushing | C. J. Marable | 17 carries, 73 yards, 1 TD |
| Coastal Carolina | Receiving | Jaivon Heiligh | 8 receptions, 108 yards, 1 TD |
| Louisiana | Passing | Levi Lewis | 14/24, 173 yards, 1 TD, 1 INT |
| Louisiana | Rushing | Levi Lewis | 6 carries, 84 yards, 1 TD |
| Louisiana | Receiving | Jalen Williams | 4 receptions, 89 yards, 1 TD |

=== Georgia Southern ===
Georgia Southern at Coastal Carolina

| Team | 1 | 2 | 3 | 4 | Total |
|---|---|---|---|---|---|
| Eagles | 7 | 7 | 0 | 0 | 14 |
| • No. 25 Chanticleers | 7 | 7 | 0 | 14 | 28 |

- Date: October 24, 2020
- Location: Brooks Stadium
  Conway, SC
- Game start: 12:02 p.m. EDT
- Elapsed time: 3 hours and 20 minutes
- Game attendance: 5,000
- Game weather: 75 °F (24 °C) • Weather: Fair • Wind: N 2 MPH
- Referee: T. Livingston
- TV announcers (ESPNU): Courtney Lyle (play–by–play) and Rene Ingoglia (analyst)

Scoring summary
| 1 | 07:10 | CCU | Sam Denmark 72-yard pass from Fred Payton (Massimo Biscardi kick) (2 plays, 71 yards, 0:46) | CCU 7–0 |
| 1 | 00:57 | GASO | Wesley Kennedy III 60-yard punt returned (Alex Raynor kick) (3 plays, −7 yards, 2:14) | TIE 7–7 |
| 2 | 08:57 | CCU | Kameron Brown 2-yard pass from Fred Payton (Massimo Biscardi kick) (4 plays, 59 yards, 2:00) | CCU 14–7 |
| 2 | 00:24 | GASO | J. D. King 5-yard rush (Alex Raynor kick) (7 plays, 54 yards, 1:07) | TIE 14–14 |
| 4 | 08:53 | CCU | C. J. Marable 24-yard pass from Fred Payton (Massimo Biscardi kick) (5 plays, 63 yards, 2:34) | CCU 21–14 |
| 4 | 06:58 | CCU | Reese White 20-yard rush (Massimo Biscardi kick) (1 play, 20 yards, 0:11) | CCU 28–14 |

| Line | Over/under |
|---|---|
| CCU −1 | 49 |

| Statistics | Georgia Southern | Coastal Carolina |
|---|---|---|
| First downs | 12 | 20 |
| Total yards | 218 | 382 |
| Rushing yards | 119 | 130 |
| Passing yards | 99 | 252 |
| Turnovers | 2 | 2 |
| Time of possession | 27:43 | 32:17 |

| Team | Category | Player | Statistics |
|---|---|---|---|
| Georgia Southern | Passing | Shai Werts | 7/20, 94 yards, 2 INTs |
| Georgia Southern | Rushing | J. D. King | 15 carries, 67 yards, 1 TD |
| Georgia Southern | Receiving | Malik Murray | 2 receptions, 46 yards |
| Coastal Carolina | Passing | Fred Payton | 15/28, 252 yards, 3 TDs, 2 INTs |
| Coastal Carolina | Rushing | Shermari Jones | 5 carries, 44 yards |
| Coastal Carolina | Receiving | Jaivon Heiligh | 5 receptions, 107 yards |

=== At Georgia State ===
Coastal Carolina at Georgia State

| Team | 1 | 2 | 3 | 4 | Total |
|---|---|---|---|---|---|
| • No. 20 Chanticleers | 7 | 27 | 14 | 3 | 51 |
| Panthers | 0 | 0 | 0 | 0 | 0 |

- Date: October 31, 2020
- Location: Center Parc Stadium
  Atlanta, GA
- Game start: 12:02 p.m. EDT
- Elapsed time: 2 hours and 53 minutes
- Game attendance: 3,642
- Game weather: 56 °F (13 °C) • Weather: Sunny • Wind: W 12 MPH
- Referee: Wayne Winkler
- TV announcers (ESPNU): Mike Corey (play–by–play) and Jay Walker (analyst)

Scoring summary
| 1 | 08:14 | CCU | Jaivon Heiligh 35-yard pass from Grayson McCall (Massimo Biscardi kick) (6 plays, 70 yards, 2:46) | CCU 7–0 |
| 2 | 11:39 | CCU | C. J. Marable 18-yard pass from Grayson McCall (Massimo Biscardi kick) (7 plays, 71 yards, 3:41) | CCU 14–0 |
| 2 | 10:39 | CCU | Reese White 13-yard rush (Massimo Biscardi PAT failed) (2 plays, 26 yards, 0:41) | CCU 20–0 |
| 2 | 06:32 | CCU | Jaivon Heiligh 10-yard pass from Grayson McCall (Massimo Biscardi kick) (5 plays, 52 yards, 2:09) | CCU 27–0 |
| 2 | 00:50 | CCU | Grayson McCall 2-yard rush (Massimo Biscardi kick) (10 plays, 48 yards, 4:25) | CCU 34–0 |
| 3 | 09:12 | CCU | C. J. Marable 2-yard rush (Massimo Biscardi kick) (10 plays, 65 yards, 5:48) | CCU 41–0 |
| 3 | 03:33 | CCU | Kameron Brown 12-yard pass from Grayson McCall (Massimo Biscardi kick) (7 plays, 49 yards, 3:20) | CCU 48–0 |
| 4 | 13:57 | CCU | Massimo Biscardi 24-yard field goal (7 plays, 44 yards, 3:05) | CCU 51–0 |

| Line | Over/under |
|---|---|
| CCU −4 | 60.5 |

| Statistics | Coastal Carolina | Georgia State |
|---|---|---|
| First downs | 30 | 5 |
| Total yards | 530 | 106 |
| Rushing yards | 250 | 76 |
| Passing yards | 280 | 30 |
| Turnovers | 1 | 2 |
| Time of possession | 41:04 | 18:56 |

| Team | Category | Player | Statistics |
|---|---|---|---|
| Coastal Carolina | Passing | Grayson McCall | 18/24, 254 yards, 4 TDs |
| Coastal Carolina | Rushing | C. J. Marable | 10 carries, 71 yards, 1 TD |
| Coastal Carolina | Receiving | Jaivon Heiligh | 5 receptions, 81 yards, 2 TDs |
| Georgia State | Passing | Cornelious Brown IV | 6/10, 30 yards, 1 INT |
| Georgia State | Rushing | Destin Coates | 11 carries, 56 yards |
| Georgia State | Receiving | Sam Pinckney | 2 receptions, 15 yards |

=== South Alabama ===
South Alabama at Coastal Carolina

| Team | 1 | 2 | 3 | 4 | Total |
|---|---|---|---|---|---|
| Jaguars | 3 | 3 | 0 | 0 | 6 |
| • No. 15 Chanticleers | 14 | 3 | 0 | 6 | 23 |

- Date: November 7, 2020
- Location: Brooks Stadium
  Conway, SC
- Game start: 8:02 p.m. EST
- Elapsed time: 3 hours, 6 minutes
- Game attendance: 5,000
- Game weather: 69 °F (21 °C) • Weather: Clear • Wind: NE, 5 MPH
- Referee: Marshall Lewis
- TV announcers (ESPNU): Courtney Lyle (play–by–play) and Rene Ingoglia (analyst)

Scoring summary
| 1 | 10:24 | CCU | Shermari Jones 1-yard run (Massimo Biscardi kick) (7 plays, 72 yards, 2:48) | CCU 7–0 |
| 1 | 5:06 | USA | Diego Guajardo 31-yard field goal (11 plays, 62 yards, 5:18) | CCU 7–3 |
| 1 | 5:06 | CCU | C. J. Marable 9-yard pass from Grayson McCall (Massimo Biscardi kick) (6 plays, 75 yards, 2:50) | CCU 14–3 |
| 2 | 5:08 | USA | Diego Guajardo 43-yard field goal (13 plays, 74 yards, 5:15) | CCU 14–6 |
| 2 | 0:18 | CCU | Massimo Biscardi 26-yard field goal (7 plays, 61 yards, 2:11) | CCU 17–6 |
| 4 | 10:47 | CCU | Massimo Biscardi 30-yard field goal (7 plays, 46 yards, 3:33) | CCU 20–6 |
| 4 | 6:07 | CCU | Massimo Biscardi 27-yard field goal (8 plays, 72 yards, 4:10) | CCU 23–6 |

| Line | Over/under |
|---|---|
| CCU −17 | 57 |

| Statistics | South Alabama | Coastal Carolina |
|---|---|---|
| First downs | 16 | 18 |
| Total yards | 336 | 445 |
| Rushing yards | 93 | 236 |
| Passing yards | 243 | 209 |
| Turnovers | 2 | 2 |
| Time of possession | 30:15 | 29:45 |

| Team | Category | Player | Statistics |
|---|---|---|---|
| South Alabama | Passing | Desmond Trotter | 23/31, 243 yards |
| South Alabama | Rushing | Carlos Davis | 17 carries, 73 yards |
| South Alabama | Receiving | Jalen Wayne | 5 receptions, 91 yards |
| Coastal Carolina | Passing | Grayson McCall | 17/24, 209 yards, 1 TD |
| Coastal Carolina | Rushing | Reese White | 9 carries, 81 yards |
| Coastal Carolina | Receiving | Jaivon Heiligh | 5 receptions, 95 yards |

=== Appalachian State ===
Appalachian State at Coastal Carolina

| Team | 1 | 2 | 3 | 4 | Total |
|---|---|---|---|---|---|
| Mountaineers | 7 | 10 | 3 | 3 | 23 |
| • No. 15 Chanticleers | 6 | 3 | 12 | 13 | 34 |

- Date: November 21, 2020
- Location: Brooks Stadium
  Conway, SC
- Game start: 12:01 p.m. EST
- Elapsed time: 3:35
- Game attendance: 5,000
- Game weather: 72 °F (22 °C) • Weather: Sunny • Wind: ESE, 2 MPH
- Referee: T. Livingston
- TV announcers (ESPN2): Clay Matvick (play–by–play), Dustin Fox (analyst), Marty Smith (sideline reporter)

Scoring summary
| 1 | 11:40 | APP | Camerun Peoples 1-yard run (Chandler Staton kick) (8 plays, 70 yards, 3:20) | APP 7–0 |
| 1 | 11:29 | CCU | Isaiah Likely 75-yard pass from Grayson McCall (Massimo Biscardi PAT failed) (1 play, 75 yards, 0:11) | APP 7–6 |
| 2 | 10:50 | CCU | Massimo Biscardi 51-yard field goal (9 plays, 27 yards, 5:10) | CCU 9–7 |
| 2 | 4:57 | APP | Chandler Staton 44-yard field goal (12 plays, 48 yards, 5:53) | APP 10–9 |
| 2 | 0:09 | APP | Christian Wells 25-yard pass from Zac Thomas (Chandler Staton kick) (9 plays, 84 yards, 0:51) | APP 17–9 |
| 3 | 14:11 | CCU | Grayson McCall 62-yard run (Two-point pass conversion failed) (3 plays, 65 yards, 0:49) | APP 17–15 |
| 3 | 10:55 | APP | Chandler Staton 36-yard field goal (7 plays, 69 yards, 3:12) | APP 20–15 |
| 3 | 6:21 | CCU | C. J. Marable 19-yard pass from Grayson McCall (Two-point pass conversion failed) (10 plays, 65 yards, 4:34) | CCU 21–20 |
| 4 | 11:47 | APP | Chandler Staton 45-yard field goal (10 plays, 53 yards, 5:07) | APP 23–21 |
| 4 | 2:24 | CCU | Reese White 3-yard run (Two-point pass conversion failed) (10 plays, 49 yards, 4:35) | CCU 27–23 |
| 4 | 1:20 | CCU | D'Jordan Strong 38-yard interception return (Massimo Biscardi kick) (4 plays, −10 yards, 1:04) | CCU 34–23 |

| Line | Over/under |
|---|---|
| CCU −3 | 49 |

| Statistics | Appalachian State | Coastal Carolina |
|---|---|---|
| First downs | 22 | 16 |
| Total yards | 415 | 369 |
| Rushing yards | 204 | 189 |
| Passing yards | 211 | 200 |
| Turnovers | 3 | 1 |
| Time of possession | 33:50 | 26:10 |

| Team | Category | Player | Statistics |
|---|---|---|---|
| Appalachian State | Passing | Zac Thomas | 17/29, 211 yards, 1 TD, 3 INTs |
| Appalachian State | Rushing | Camerun Peoples | 27 carries, 178 yards, 1 TD |
| Appalachian State | Receiving | Malik Williams | 3 receptions, 79 yards |
| Coastal Carolina | Passing | Grayson McCall | 12/21, 200 yards, 2 TDs |
| Coastal Carolina | Rushing | Grayson McCall | 14 carries, 69 yards, 1 TD |
| Coastal Carolina | Receiving | Isaiah Likely | 3 receptions, 118 yards, 1 TD |

=== At Texas State ===
Coastal Carolina at Texas State

| Team | 1 | 2 | 3 | 4 | Total |
|---|---|---|---|---|---|
| • No. 20 Chanticleers | 14 | 21 | 7 | 7 | 49 |
| Bobcats | 7 | 0 | 0 | 7 | 14 |

- Date: November 28, 2020
- Location: Bobcat Stadium
  San Marcos, TX
- Game start: 3:05 p.m. EST
- Elapsed time: 2 hours and 50 minutes
- Game attendance: 3,245
- Game weather: 59 °F (15 °C) • Weather: Cloudy, Light Rain • Wind: NNE 8 MPH
- Referee: Marshall Lewis
- TV announcers (ESPN+): Brant Freeman (play–by–play) and Keith Moreland (analyst)

Scoring summary
| 1 | 10:46 | CCU | C. J. Marable 14-yard rush (Massimo Biscardi kick) (7 plays, 81 yards, 2:43) | CCU 7–0 |
| 1 | 07:08 | CCU | C. J. Marable 9-yard rush (Massimo Biscardi kick); 5 plays, 45 yards, 2:31) | CCU 14–0 |
| 1 | 04:33 | TXST | Javen Banks 14-yard pass from Brady McBride (Seth Keller kick) (7 plays, 77 yards, 2:30) | CCU 14–7 |
| 2 | 09:54 | CCU | Reese White 10-yard rush (Massimo Biscardi kick) (8 plays, 55 yards, 3:41) | CCU 21–7 |
| 2 | 04:19 | CCU | Jaivon Heiligh 14-yard pass from Grayson McCall (Massimo Biscardi kick) (7 plays, 78 yards, 3:37) | CCU 28–7 |
| 2 | 00:25 | CCU | Jaivon Heiligh 7-yard pass from Grayson McCall (Massimo Biscardi kick) (8 plays, 77 yards, 2:32) | CCU 35–7 |
| 3 | 10:01 | CCU | C. J. Marable 23-yard rush (Massimo Biscardi kick) (9 plays, 75 yards, 4:59) | CCU 42–7 |
| 4 | 09:00 | CCU | Baden Pinson 9-yard rus (Kieran Colahan kick) (13 plays, 94 yards, 7:11) | CCU 49–7 |
| 4 | 06:08 | TXST | Jahmyl Jeter 5-yard rush (Seth Keller kick) (5 plays, 66 yards, 2:46) | CCU 49–14 |

| Line | Over/under |
|---|---|
| CCU −17 | 58.5 |

| Statistics | Coastal Carolina | Texas State |
|---|---|---|
| First downs | 32 | 13 |
| Total yards | 572 | 318 |
| Rushing yards | 406 | 116 |
| Passing yards | 116 | 202 |
| Turnovers | 0 | 1 |
| Time of possession | 37:31 | 22:29 |

| Team | Category | Player | Statistics |
|---|---|---|---|
| Coastal Carolina | Passing | Grayson McCall | 11/18, 154 yards, 2 TDs |
| Coastal Carolina | Rushing | C. J. Marable | 16 carries, 157 yards, 3 TDs |
| Coastal Carolina | Receiving | Isaiah Likely | 4 receptions, 73 yards |
| Texas State | Passing | Brady McBride | 20/26, 202 yards, 1 TD |
| Texas State | Rushing | Jahyml Jeter | 7 carries, 47 yards, 1 TD |
| Texas State | Receiving | Calvin Hill | 3 receptions, 68 yards |

=== BYU ===
Coastal's originally scheduled opponent for this week was Liberty, which was forced to cancel the game due to COVID-19 issues. BYU, which had been looking to add a game for this week, was booked as the Flames' replacement.

BYU at Coastal Carolina

| Team | 1 | 2 | 3 | 4 | Total |
|---|---|---|---|---|---|
| No. 13 Cougars | 0 | 14 | 3 | 0 | 17 |
| • No. 18 Chanticleers | 6 | 7 | 3 | 6 | 22 |

- Date: December 5, 2020
- Location: Brooks Stadium
  Conway, SC
- Game start: 5:37 p.m. EST
- Elapsed time: 3 hours and 20 minutes
- Game attendance: 5,000
- Referee: Kyle Olson
- TV announcers (ESPNU): Bill Roth (play–by–play) and Dustin Fox (analyst)

Scoring summary
| 1 | 00:10 | CCU | C. J. Marable 6-yard rush (Massimo Biscardi PAT failed) (17 plays, 94 yards, 9:05) | CCU 6–0 |
| 2 | 13:50 | BYU | Tyler Allgeier 42-yard rush (Jake Oldroyd kick) (4 plays, 76 yards, 1:15) | BYU 7–6 |
| 2 | 04:00 | CCU | Reese White 1-yard rush (Massimo Biscardi kick) (11 plays, 51 yards, 5:54) | CCU 13–7 |
| 2 | 01:45 | BYU | Dax Milne 41-yard pass from Zach Wilson (Jake Oldroyd kick) (6 plays, 94 yards, 2:07) | BYU 14–13 |
| 3 | 12:28 | BYU | Jake Oldroyd 29-yard field goal (7 plays, 56 yards, 2:27) | BYU 17–13 |
| 3 | 06:32 | CCU | Massimo Biscardi 41-yard field goal (4 plays, 7 yards, 2:07) | BYU 17–16 |
| 4 | 11:35 | CCU | C. J. Marable 2-yard rush (Two-point conversion rush attempt failed) (13 plays, 85 yards, 6:06) | CCU 22–17 |

| Line | Over/under |
|---|---|
| BYU −10.5 | 63 |

| Statistics | BYU | Coastal Carolina |
|---|---|---|
| First downs | 21 | 22 |
| Total yards | 405 | 366 |
| Rushing yards | 165 | 281 |
| Passing yards | 240 | 85 |
| Turnovers | 2 | 1 |
| Time of possession | 22:09 | 37:51 |

| Team | Category | Player | Statistics |
|---|---|---|---|
| BYU | Passing | Zach Wilson | 19/30, 240 yards, 1 TD, 1 INT |
| BYU | Rushing | Tyler Allgeier | 13 carries, 106 yards, 1 TD |
| BYU | Receiving | Dax Milne | 6 receptions, 106 yards, 1 TD |
| Coastal Carolina | Passing | Grayson McCall | 10/15, 85 yards |
| Coastal Carolina | Rushing | C. J. Marable | 23 carries, 132 yards, 2 TD |
| Coastal Carolina | Receiving | Kameron Brown | 4 receptions, 47 yards |

=== At Troy ===
Postponed from originally scheduled date of November 14.

Coastal Carolina at Troy

| Team | 1 | 2 | 3 | 4 | Total |
|---|---|---|---|---|---|
| • No. 13 Chanticleers | 14 | 7 | 7 | 14 | 42 |
| Trojans | 3 | 13 | 7 | 15 | 38 |

- Date: December 12, 2020
- Location: Veterans Memorial Stadium
  Troy, AL
- Game start: 3:05 p.m. EST
- Elapsed time: 3 hours and 30 minutes
- Game attendance: 11,000
- Game weather: 72 °F (22 °C) • Weather: Cloudy • Wind: N 11 MPH
- Referee: Wayne Winkler
- TV announcers (ESPN+): Will Kollmeyer (play–by–play) and Ben Stanfield (analyst)

Scoring summary
| 1 | 13:48 | CCU | C. J. Marable 59-yard rush (Massimo Biscardi kick) (3 plays, 75 yards, 1:12) | CCU 7–0 |
| 1 | 08:22 | CCU | C. J. Marable 20-yard pass from Grayson McCall (Massimo Biscardi kick) (9 plays, 90 yards, 4:18) | CCU 14–0 |
| 1 | 04:02 | TROY | Evan Legassey 42-yard field goal (14 plays, 45 yards, 4:20) | CCU 14–3 |
| 2 | 12:26 | TROY | Kimani Vidal 4-yard rush (Evan Legassey kick) (13 plays, 87 yards, 3:51) | CCU 14–10 |
| 2 | 05:27 | TROY | Evan Legassey 28-yard field goal (14 plays, 79 yards, 5:28) | CCU 14–13 |
| 2 | 01:38 | CCU | C. J. Marable 2-yard rush (Massimo Biscardi kick) (8 plays, 75 yards, 3:49) | CCU 21–13 |
| 2 | 00:00 | TROY | Evan Legassey 23-yard field goal (8 plays, 66 yards, 1:38) | CCU 21–16 |
| 3 | 04:33 | CCU | Jaivon Heiligh 6-yard pass from Grayson McCall (Massimo Biscardi kick) (16 plays, 83 yards, 9:48) | CCU 28–16 |
| 3 | 03:18 | TROY | Reggie Todd 41-yard pass from Gunnar Watson (Evan Legassey kick) (4 plays, 69 yards, 1:15) | CCU 28–23 |
| 4 | 05:03 | CCU | Grayson McCall 2-yard rush (Massimo Biscardi kick) (4 plays, 4 yards, 2:18) | CCU 35–23 |
| 4 | 02:48 | TROY | Jamontez Woods 3-yard rush (Evan Legassey kick) (11 plays, 75 yards, 2:15) | CCU 35–30 |
| 4 | 01:20 | TROY | Tray Eafford 6-yard pass from Jacob Free (Jacob Free two-point conversion pass to Khalil McClain) (7 plays, 40 yards, 1:11) | TROY 38–35 |
| 4 | 00:35 | CCU | Jaivon Heiligh 23-yard pass from Grayson McCall (Massimo Biscardi kick) (5 plays, 75 yards, 0:45) | CCU 42–38 |

| Line | Over/under |
|---|---|
| CCU −13.5 | 51.5 |

| Statistics | Coastal Carolina | Troy |
|---|---|---|
| First downs | 29 | 29 |
| Total yards | 514 | 443 |
| Rushing yards | 176 | 89 |
| Passing yards | 338 | 354 |
| Turnovers | 1 | 3 |
| Time of possession | 36:28 | 23:32 |

| Team | Category | Player | Statistics |
|---|---|---|---|
| Coastal Carolina | Passing | Grayson McCall | 24/29, 338 yards, 3 TDs, 1 INT |
| Coastal Carolina | Rushing | C. J. Marable | 20 carries, 120 yards, 2 TDs |
| Coastal Carolina | Receiving | Jaivon Heiligh | 11 receptions, 138 yards, 2 TDs |
| Troy | Passing | Gunnar Watson | 25/37, 260 yards, 1 TD, 1 INT |
| Troy | Rushing | Jamontez Woods | 9 carries, 49 yards, 1 TD |
| Troy | Receiving | Kaylon Geiger | 9 receptions, 103 yards |

=== Vs. Liberty (Cure Bowl) ===
Liberty vs. Coastal Carolina

| Team | 1 | 2 | 3 | 4 | OT | Total |
|---|---|---|---|---|---|---|
| • Flames | 14 | 3 | 7 | 10 | 3 | 37 |
| No. 12 Chanticleers | 0 | 13 | 6 | 15 | 0 | 34 |

- Date: December 26, 2020
- Location: Camping World Stadium
  Orlando, FL
- Game start: 7:35 p.m. EST
- Elapsed time: 3 hours and 49 minutes
- Game attendance: 4,488
- Game weather: 44 °F (7 °C) • Weather: Frosty • Wind: Calm
- Referee: Ron Hudson
- TV announcers (ESPN): Roy Philpott (play–by–play), Kelly Stouffer (analyst), and Alex Chappell (sideline reporter)

Scoring summary
| 1 | 06:59 | LIB | Malik Willis 5-yard rush (Alex Barbir kick) (10 plays, 64 yards, 4:54) | LIB 7–0 |
| 1 | 00:06 | LIB | Malik Willis 6-yard rush (Alex Barbir kick) (9 plays, 68 yards, 5:18) | LIB 14–0 |
| 2 | 06:00 | CCU | Massimo Biscardi 21-yard field goal (12 plays, 66 yards, 6:11) | LIB 14–3 |
| 2 | 02:02 | CCU | Isaiah Likely 25-yard pass from Grayson McCall (Massimo Biscardi kick) (4 plays, 62 yards, 2:02) | LIB 14–10 |
| 2 | 00:42 | LIB | Alex Barbir 37-yard field goal (7 plays, 40 yards, 1:20) | LIB 17–10 |
| 2 | 00:00 | CCU | Massimo Biscardi 33-yard field goal (7 plays, 50 yards, 0:42) | LIB 17–13 |
| 3 | 08:28 | LIB | Malik Willis 10-yard rush (Alex Barbir kick) (1 play, 10 yards, 0:05) | LIB 24–13 |
| 3 | 04:36 | CCU | Greg Latushko 43-yard pass from Grayson McCall (Grayson McCall two-point conversion pass attempt failed) (7 plays, 80 yards, 3:52) | LIB 24–19 |
| 4 | 13:22 | LIB | Malik Willis 3-yard rush (Alex Barbir kick) (11 plays, 75 yards, 6:14) | LIB 31–19 |
| 4 | 10:34 | CCU | Grayson McCall 1-yard rush (Massimo Biscardi kick) (5 plays, 77 yards, 2:48) | LIB 31–26 |
| 4 | 05:03 | LIB | Alex Barbir 32-yard field goal (10 plays, 61 yards, 5:31) | LIB 34–26 |
| 4 | 03:01 | CCU | Greg Latushko 5-yard pass from Grayson McCall (Grayson McCall two-point conversion rush) (6 plays, 72 yards, 2:02) | TIE 34–34 |
| 1OT | | LIB | Alex Barbir 44-yard field goal (4 plays, -1 yards) | LIB 37–34 |

| Line | Over/under |
|---|---|
| CCU –6.5 | 60 |

| Statistics | Liberty | Coastal Carolina |
|---|---|---|
| First downs | 26 | 24 |
| Total yards | 475 | 483 |
| Rushing yards | 255 | 165 |
| Passing yards | 220 | 318 |
| Turnovers | 3 | 1 |
| Time of possession | 30:49 | 29:11 |

| Team | Category | Player | Statistics |
|---|---|---|---|
| Liberty | Passing | Malik Willis | 19/29, 220 yards, 2 INTs |
| Liberty | Rushing | Malik Willis | 21 carries, 137 yards, 4 TDs |
| Liberty | Receiving | DJ Stubbs | 5 receptions, 68 yards |
| Coastal Carolina | Passing | Grayson McCall | 21/32, 318 yards, 3 TDs, 1 INT |
| Coastal Carolina | Rushing | Grayson McCall | 15 carries, 96 yards, 1 TD |
| Coastal Carolina | Receiving | Jaivon Heiligh | 13 receptions, 178 yards |

== Players drafted into the NFL ==
| Round | Pick | Player | Position | NFL club |
|---|---|---|---|---|
| 6 | 191 | Tarron Jackson | DE | Philadelphia Eagles |
