= 2020 Texas State Bobcats football team =

American college football season

2020 Texas State Bobcats football
- Conference: Sun Belt Conference
- West Division
- Record: 2–10 (2–6 Sun Belt)
- Head coach: Jake Spavital (2nd season)
- Offensive coordinator: Jacob Peeler (1st season)
- Offensive scheme: Air raid
- Defensive coordinator: Zac Spavital (2nd season)
- Base defense: 3–4
- Home stadium: Bobcat Stadium

2020 Sun Belt Conference football standings
	Conf.			Overall
Team	W		L	W		L
East Division
No. 14 Coastal Carolina xy+	8	–	0	11	–	1
Appalachian State	6	–	2	9	–	3
Georgia Southern	4	–	4	8	–	5
Georgia State	4	–	4	6	–	4
Troy	3	–	4	5	–	6
West Division
No. 15 Louisiana xy+	7	–	1	10	–	1
South Alabama	3	–	5	4	–	7
Arkansas State	2	–	6	4	–	7
Texas State	2	–	6	2	–	10
Louisiana–Monroe	0	–	7	0	–	10
Championship: Louisiana at Coastal Carolina (Canceled)
+ – Conference co-champions; x – Division champion/co-champions; y – Championship game participant; Rankings from AP Poll

The 2020 Texas State Bobcats football team represented Texas State University in the 2020 NCAA Division I FBS football season. The Bobcats played their home games at Bobcat Stadium in San Marcos, Texas, and competed in the West Division of the Sun Belt Conference. They were led by second-year head coach Jake Spavital.

== Preseason ==
=== Recruiting class ===
College recruiting
Name	Hometown	School	Height	Weight	40^{‡}	Commit date
Russell Baker; Offensive Lineman	Owasso, OK	Owasso High School; Northeastern Oklahoma A&M	6 ft 5 in (1.96 m)	300 lb (140 kg)	–	Dec 18, 2019
Russell Baker; Offensive Lineman	Recruit ratings: Scout: Rivals: 247Sports: ESPN:					
Marcell Barbee; Wide Receiver	Pueblo, CO	Pueblo South HS; Iowa Western CC	6 ft 2 in (1.88 m)	195 lb (88 kg)	–	Dec 18, 2019
Marcell Barbee; Wide Receiver	Recruit ratings: Scout: Rivals: 247Sports: ESPN:					
Zion Childress; Defensive Back	New Caney, TX	New Caney HS	6 ft 0 in (1.83 m)	183 lb (83 kg)	–	Feb 5, 2020
Zion Childress; Defensive Back	Recruit ratings: Scout: Rivals: 247Sports: ESPN:					
Alex Costilla; Offensive Line	San Marcos, TX	San Marcos HS; Tyler JC	6 ft 4 in (1.93 m)	295 lb (134 kg)	–	Dec 18, 2019
Alex Costilla; Offensive Line	Recruit ratings: Scout: Rivals: 247Sports: ESPN:					
John Emmanuel; Outside Linebacker	Dallas, TX	Bishop Dunne HS	6 ft 1 in (1.85 m)	190 lb (86 kg)	–	Dec 18, 2019
John Emmanuel; Outside Linebacker	Recruit ratings: Scout: Rivals: 247Sports: ESPN:					
Josh Emmanuel; Inside Linebacker	Dallas, TX	Bishop Dunne HS	6 ft 0 in (1.83 m)	216 lb (98 kg)	–	Dec 18, 2019
Josh Emmanuel; Inside Linebacker	Recruit ratings: Scout: Rivals: 247Sports: ESPN:					
Jaycob Horn; Wide Receiver	Tupelo, MS	Tupelo HS	6 ft 2 in (1.88 m)	205 lb (93 kg)	–	Feb 5, 2020
Jaycob Horn; Wide Receiver	Recruit ratings: Scout: Rivals: 247Sports: ESPN:					
Grid Isidore; Safety	Slidell, LA	Salmen HS; Nicholls State; Tyler JC	6 ft 1 in (1.85 m)	185 lb (84 kg)	–	Dec 18, 2019
Grid Isidore; Safety	Recruit ratings: Scout: Rivals: 247Sports: ESPN:					
Drue Jackson; Wide Receiver	Sachse, TX	Sachse HS; Washington State; Tyler JC	6 ft 1 in (1.85 m)	200 lb (91 kg)	–	Dec 18, 2019
Drue Jackson; Wide Receiver	Recruit ratings: Scout: Rivals: 247Sports: ESPN:					
Jahmyl Jeter; Running Back	San Antonio, TX	Brennan HS; Oklahoma State	6 ft 0 in (1.83 m)	200 lb (91 kg)	–	Dec 18, 2019
Jahmyl Jeter; Running Back	Recruit ratings: Scout: Rivals: 247Sports: ESPN:					
Isaiah Karriem; Linebacker	Columbus, MS	Columbus HS; Mississippi Delta CC	6 ft 0 in (1.83 m)	220 lb (100 kg)	–	Dec 18, 2019
Isaiah Karriem; Linebacker	Recruit ratings: Scout: Rivals: 247Sports: ESPN:					
Austin Markiewicz; Offensive Line	McKinney, TX	McKinney North HS	6 ft 4 in (1.93 m)	290 lb (130 kg)	–	Dec 18, 2019
Austin Markiewicz; Offensive Line	Recruit ratings: Scout: Rivals: 247Sports: ESPN:					
Issiah Nixon; Linebacker	Fort Bend, TX	Elkins HS	6 ft 0 in (1.83 m)	220 lb (100 kg)	–	Dec 18, 2019
Issiah Nixon; Linebacker	Recruit ratings: Scout: Rivals: 247Sports: ESPN:					
Derrick Ray Jr. Defensive End	Rosenberg, TX	Terry HS; Houston Baptist; Trinity Valley CC	6 ft 2 in (1.88 m)	240 lb (110 kg)	–	Feb 5, 2020
Derrick Ray Jr. Defensive End	Recruit ratings: Scout: Rivals: 247Sports: ESPN:					
Silas Robinson; Offensive Line	Yoakum, TX	Yoakum HS; Arkansas	6 ft 4 in (1.93 m)	306 lb (139 kg)	–	Dec 18, 2019
Silas Robinson; Offensive Line	Recruit ratings: Scout: Rivals: 247Sports: ESPN:					
Trenton Scott; Offensive Line	Luling, TX	Luling HS	6 ft 6 in (1.98 m)	262 lb (119 kg)	–	Dec 18, 2019
Trenton Scott; Offensive Line	Recruit ratings: Scout: Rivals: 247Sports: ESPN:					
Tory Spears; Defensive Back	Houston, TX	Cypress Woods HS; Iowa State	6 ft 3 in (1.91 m)	200 lb (91 kg)	–	Dec 19, 2019
Tory Spears; Defensive Back	Recruit ratings: Scout: Rivals: 247Sports: ESPN:					
Brock Sturges; Running Back	Allen, TX	Allen HS; Arizona State; Butler CC	5 ft 11 in (1.80 m)	200 lb (91 kg)	–	Dec 18, 2019
Brock Sturges; Running Back	Recruit ratings: Scout: Rivals: 247Sports: ESPN:					
Maureese Wren; Defensive End	Mesquite, TX	Horn HS; Louisiana Tech; Tyler JC	6 ft 4 in (1.93 m)	250 lb (110 kg)	–	Dec 18, 2019
Maureese Wren; Defensive End	Recruit ratings: Scout: Rivals: 247Sports: ESPN:					

=== Sun Belt media poll ===
The Sun Belt coaches poll was released in July 2020. Texas State was predicted to finish in fourth place in the West Division.

=== Sun Belt Preseason All-Conference teams ===
Offense

2nd team

- Aaron Brewer – SR, Offensive Line

Defense

1st team

- Bryan London II – SR, Linebacker

2nd team

- Nikolas Daniels – SR, Linebacker

=== Award watch lists ===
Listed in the order that they were released

Award	Player	Position	Year
Nagurski Trophy	Bryan London II	Linebacker	SR
Wuerffel Trophy	Hutch White	Wide Receiver	SR

== Roster ==
2020 Texas State Bobcats football team roster
Players
Coaches
Offense

Pos.	#	Name	Class
WR	1	Jah"Marae Sheread	So
QB	2	Brady McBride	So
WR	3	Jeremiah Haydel	Sr
WR	4	Dylan Jantz	Fr
RB	5	Jaylin Nelson	Sr
QB	7	Jaylen Gipson	Jr
WR	8	Jacoby Hopkins	So
WR	9	Drue Jackson	So
QB	10	Cedric Case	Fr
QB	11	Tyler Vitt	Jr
WR	12	Javen Banks	Jr
WR	13	Trevis Graham Jr.	Jr
WR	15	Blake Aragon	So
WR	16	Kenny Frazier	Fr
QB	17	D. J. Bolger	Fr
WR	18	Marcell Barbee	Jr
QB	19	Jackson Napper	Fr
WR	21	Peyton Tuggle	Jr
RB	22	Calvin Hill	Fr
RB	23	Robert Brown Jr.	Sr
WR	24	Caleb Twyford	Sr
RB	25	Brock Sturges	So
RB	26	Anthony Smith	Jr
RB	28	Jahmyl Jeter	So
RB	33	Marquis Brown	So
RB	34	Alec Harris	So
WR	46	Blake Hoffman	So
TE	48	Dotson Schaefer	So
OL	50	Reece Jordan	Sr
OL	53	Eddie Rivas	Jr
OL	56	Morgan Moore	So
OL	62	Jacob Fryrear	Sr
OL	65	Kameron Jemison	Jr
OL	66	Chris Julson	Fr
OL	67	Ronald Copney	Jr
OL	69	Tanner King	Jr
OL	71	Tate Heitmeier	Jr
OL	73	Dalton Cooper	Fr
OL	74	Russell Baker	Jr
OL	75	Silas Robinson	So
OL	76	Kylar Cooks	So
OL	79	Jayden Smith	So
WR	80	Chandler Speights	Jr
WR	82	Kevin Howard	Jr
WR	83	Micah Hilts	So
TE	84	Seth Caillouet	So
WR	86	Arik Bennett	Jr
TE	87	Jackson Lanam	So
WR	88	Sevonne Rhea	Fr
OL		Alex Costilla	Jr
WR		Jaycob Horn	Fr
OL		Austin Markiewicz	Fr
OL		Trenton Scott	Fr

Defense

Pos.	#	Name	Class
S	2	Grid Isidore	Jr
CB	3	Kordell Rodgers	Sr
LB	4	Gavin Graham	Sr
DB	5	Kevin Anderson	So
S	6	Jared Hopper	Fr
LB	7	Markeveon Coleman	Sr
LB	8	Hal Vinson	Sr
LB	9	Maureese Wren	Jr
S	10	Auston Deason	So
DB	13	DeJordan Mask	So
DB	14	Tory Spears	So
DB	15	Jarron Morris	So
S	16	Pierce Withers	So
DB	20	Khambrail Winters	So
S	21	Josh Newman	Jr
LB	22	Kenny Haynes	Fr
S	23	Preston Dimery	Jr
OLB	25	Devin Martinez	Fr
OLB	27	London Harris	Jr
DB	28	C. J. Johnson	So
DB	29	Jason Williams	Fr
ILB	31	Isaiah Karriem	Jr
DB	35	Ashton Johnson	So
DB	36	Jamarcus Roberson	Jr
LB	43	Mitchell Dunahoo	So
ILB	44	John Brannon	Jr
DE	45	Jakharious Smith	Jr
DL	52	J. T. Greer	Fr
LB	57	Zane Little	So
DL	59	Nick Wilkins	Jr
DT	74	Tobi Orundami	So
DT	88	Caeveon Patton	Sr
DL	90	Jake Lynch	So
DL	91	Jordan Revels	So
DL	92	Devin Henderson	Fr
DL	94	Jaquel Pierce	Sr
DL	95	Nico Ezidore	Jr
DL	96	Kingsley Onyirioha	Sr
DE	97	Emmanuel Galvan-Vazquez	Jr
NT	98	Gjemar Daniels	Jr
DB		Zion Childress	Fr
LB		John Emmanuel	Fr
LB		Josh Emmanuel	Fr
LB		Issiah Nixon	Fr
DE		Derrick Ray Jr.	Jr

Special teams

Pos.	#	Name	Class
K	37	Alan Orona	Fr
P	38	Seamus O'Kelly	So
P	39	Clayton Stewart	So
LS	42	Alex Lipps	So
K	43	Seth Keller	So
K	47	Jacob Bates	Jr

Head coach

- Jake Spavital (Missouri State)

Coordinators/assistant coaches

- Jacob Peeler (Louisiana Tech)
  Offensive coordinator
- Zac Spavital (Murray State)
  Defensive coordinator
- Archie McDaniel (Texas A&M)
  Co-defensive coordinator/inside linebackers
- Nick Whitworth (Idaho State)
  Special teams coordinator/running backs
- Brett Dewhurst (Texas Tech)
  Defensive backs
- Clay McGuire (Texas Tech)
  Offensive line
- Tevin Mims (Texas Tech)
  Outside linebackers
- Jacori Greer (New Mexico)
  Defensive line
- Brian Hamilton (SUNY Cortland)
  Tight ends
- Bryson Abraham (Louisiana Tech)
  Wide receivers
- Patrick Doherty (Franklin College)
  Offensive/special teams analyst
- Boone Feldt (Texas–Permian Basin)
  Offensive graduate assistant
- Zach McCarthy (Texas State)
  Defensive graduate assistant
- Adrian McDonald (Houston)
  Defensive graduate assistant
- Mason Tobeck (Utah State)
  Special teams graduate assistant
- Damon Harrington
  Head strength and conditioning coach
- Jason Russell
  Assistant strength and conditioning coach
- Kyle Vagher
  Strength and conditioning coach
- Andrew Johnson
  Director of equipment operations
- Sterling Price
  Assistant equipment manager
- Jake Macauley
  Video coordinator
- Mehrzad Sabzevari
  Assistant video coordinator
- Jeremy Cobb
  Head football athletic trainer
- Will Decraene
  Assistant athletic trainer
- James Sherman
  Director of player development
- Haleigh Blocker
  Director of football operations
- Connor Anderson
  Director of player personnel

Legend

- (C) Team captain
- (S) Suspended
- (I) Ineligible
- Injured
- Redshirt

Roster
Last update: May 13, 2020

== Schedule ==
The 2020 Texas State schedule consists of 7 home and 5 away games in the regular season. The Bobcats will play host to conference foes Louisiana, Appalachian State, Arkansas State, and Coastal Carolina. They will travel to conference opponents Troy, South Alabama, and Georgia Southern

Texas State had games scheduled against Ohio and New Mexico State, which were canceled due to the COVID-19 pandemic.

Date	Time	Opponent	Site	TV	Result	Attendance
September 5	3:30 p.m.	SMU*	Bobcat Stadium; San Marcos, TX	ESPN	L 24–31	7,500
September 12	2:30 p.m.	UTSA*	Bobcat Stadium; San Marcos, TX (I-35 Rivalry)	ESPN2	L 48–51 ^{2OT}	7,500
September 19	6:30 p.m.	at Louisiana–Monroe	Malone Stadium; Monroe, LA	ESPNU	W 38–17	5,816
September 26	5:00 p.m.	at Boston College*	Alumni Stadium; Chestnut Hill, MA	ACCRSN	L 21–24	0
October 10	2:30 p.m.	at Troy	Veterans Memorial Stadium; Troy, AL	ESPN3	L 17–37	10,500
October 17	11:00 a.m.	at South Alabama	Hancock Whitney Stadium; Mobile, AL	ESPNU	L 20–30	5,142
October 24	9:15 p.m.	at No. 12 BYU*	LaVell Edwards Stadium; Provo, UT	ESPN	L 14–52	6,570
October 31	7:00 p.m.	Louisiana^{†}	Bobcat Stadium; San Marcos, TX	ESPNU	L 34–44	7,500
November 7	3:00 p.m.	Appalachian State	Bobcat Stadium; San Marcos, TX	ESPN+	L 17–38	6,745
November 14	2:00 p.m.	at Georgia Southern	Paulson Stadium; Statesboro, GA	ESPN3	L 38–40	4,478
November 21	2:00 p.m.	Arkansas State	Bobcat Stadium; San Marcos, TX	ESPN2	W 47–45	5,218
November 28	2:00 p.m.	No. 20 Coastal Carolina	Bobcat Stadium; San Marcos, TX	ESPN+	L 14–49	3,245
*Non-conference game; ^{†}Homecoming; Rankings from AP Poll and CFP Rankings after November 24 released prior to game; All times are in Central time

Schedule source:

== Game summaries ==
=== SMU ===
Southern Methodist at Texas State

Team	1	2	3	4	Total
• Mustangs	0	14	14	3	31
Bobcats	0	14	7	3	24

- Date: September 5
- Location: Bobcat Stadium
  San Marcos, Texas
- Game start: 3:30 p.m. CDT
- Elapsed time: 3 hours and 41 minutes
- Game attendance: 7,500
- Game weather: 89 °F (32 °C) • Weather: Partly Cloudy Skies • Wind: 10 ENE MPH
- Referee: Marshall Lewis
- TV announcers (ESPN): Anish Shroff (play-by-play), Tom Luginbill (analyst), Kris Budden (sideline)

Scoring summary
2	10:56	SMU	Ulysses Bentley IV 6 yard rush (Chris Naggar kick) (5 plays, 55 yards, 2:01)	SMU 7–0
2	6:04	TXST	Brock Sturges 4 yard rush (Alan Orona kick) (12 plays, 75 yards, 4:52)	Tied 7–7
2	3:47	SMU	Ulysses Bentley IV 12 yard rush (Chris Naggar kick) (7 plays, 65 yards, 2:17)	SMU 14–7
2	0:32	TXST	Jeremiah Haydel 3 yard pass from Brady McBride (Alan Orona kick) (9 plays, 75 yards, 3:15)	Tied 14–14
3	12:12	SMU	TJ McDaniel 9 yard rush (Chris Naggar kick) (9 plays, 75 yards, 2:48)	SMU 21–14
3	6:14	TXST	Chandler Speights 19 yard pass from Brady McBride (Alan Orona kick) (5 plays, 45 yards, 1:57)	Tied 21–21
3	3:26	SMU	Reggie Roberson Jr. 51 yard pass from Shane Buechele (Chris Naggar kick); 6 plays, 83 yards, 2:42)	SMU 28–21
4	2:20	SMU	Chris Naggar 32 yard field goal (5 plays, 35 yards, 1:31)	SMU 31–21
4	0:45	TXST	Alan Orona 47 yard field goal (9 plays, 45 yards, 1:35)	SMU 31–24

Statistics	SMU	TXST
First downs	26	22
Total yards	544	416
Rushing yards	177	189
Passing yards	367	227
Turnovers	3	2
Time of possession	32:03	27:57

Team	Category	Player	Statistics
SMU	Passing	Shane Buechele	26/36, 367 yards, TD, 2 INT
SMU	Rushing	TJ McDaniel	27 carries, 130 yards, TD
SMU	Receiving	Rashee Rice	5 receptions, 101 yards
Texas State	Passing	Brady McBride	21/39, 227 yards, 2 TD, INT
Texas State	Rushing	Calvin Hill	13 carries, 100 yards
Texas State	Receiving	Trevis Graham Jr.	3 receptions, 59 yards

=== UTSA ===
Texas–San Antonio at Texas State

Team	1	2	3	4	OT	2OT	Total
• Roadrunners	7	17	7	10	7	3	51
Bobcats	7	0	14	20	7	0	48

- Date: September 12
- Location: Bobcat Stadium
  San Marcos, Texas
- Game start: 2:30 p.m. CDT
- Elapsed time: 4 hours and 0 minutes
- Game attendance: 7,500
- Game weather: 89 °F (32 °C) • Weather: Partly Cloudy • Wind: NNE 7 MPH
- Referee: Jeremy Parker
- Television network: ESPN2

Scoring summary
1	13:48	TXST	Brock Sturges 66-yard pass from Tyler Vitt (Alan Orona kick) (3 plays, 73 yards, 1:12)	TXST 7–0
1	13:23	UTSA	Frank Harris 17-yard rush (Hunter Duplessis kick) (2 plays, 75 yards, 0:25)	TIE 7–7
2	12:27	UTSA	Hunter Duplessis 27-yard field goal (12 plays, 62 yards, 4:17)	UTSA 10–7
2	03:43	UTSA	Frank Harris 19-yard rush (Hunter Duplessis kick) (6 plays, 63 yards, 2:19)	UTSA 17–7
2	00:44	UTSA	Sincere McCormick 5-yard rush (Hunter Duplessis kick) (9 plays, 66 yards, 1:52)	UTSA 24–7
3	11:28	TXST	Jah'Marae Sheread 31-yard pass from Tyler Vitt (Alan Orona kick) (4 plays, 59 yards, 1:34)	UTSA 24–14
3	04:48	UTSA	Frank Harris 13-yard rush (Hunter Duplessis kick) (4 plays, 75 yards, 1:40)	UTSA 31–14
3	02:04	TXST	Calvin Harris 12-yard rush (Alan Orona kick) (2 plays, 53 yards, 0:51)	UTSA 31–21
4	10:35	TXST	Brock Sturges 2-yard rush (Alan Orona kick) (11 plays, 91 yards, 4:31)	UTSA 31–28
4	07:26	UTSA	Hunter Duplessis 42-yard field goal (8 plays, 50 yards, 3:09)	UTSA 34–28
4	03:24	UTSA	Rashad Wisdom 81-yard interception returned (Hunter Duplessis kick) (10 plays, 59 yards, 4:02)	UTSA 41–28
4	01:51	TXST	Marcel Barbee 20-yard pass from Tyler Vitt (Alan Orona kick) (6 plays, 75 yards, 1:33)	UTSA 41–35
4	01:16	TXST	Jeremiah Haydel 91-yard punt returned (Alan Orona PAT failed) (3 plays, 0 yards, 0:35)	TIE 41–41
1OT		UTSA	Joshua Cephus 25-yard pass from Frank Harris (Hunter Duplessis kick) (3 plays, 25 yards)	UTSA 48–41
1OT		TXST	Marcel Barbee 4-yard pass from Tyler Vitt (Alan Orona kick) (6 plays, 25 yards)	TIE 48–48
2OT		UTSA	Hunter Duplessis 29-yard field goal (5 plays, 13 yards)	UTSA 51–48

Statistics	UTSA	TXST
First downs	24	28
Total yards	499	474
Rushing yards	330	125
Passing yards	169	349
Turnovers	0	2
Time of possession	46:32	43:28

Team	Category	Player	Statistics
UTSA	Passing	Frank Harris	22/31, 169 yards, TD
UTSA	Rushing	Sincere McCormick	29 carries, 197 yards, TD
UTSA	Receiving	Brennon Dingle	4 receptions, 54 yards
Texas State	Passing	Tyler Vitt	26/39, 346 yards, 4 TD, 2 INT
Texas State	Rushing	Brock Sturges	17 carries, 67 yards, TD
Texas State	Receiving	Marcel Barbee	4 receptions, 75 yards, 2 TD

=== At Louisiana–Monroe ===
Texas State at Louisiana–Monroe

Team	1	2	3	4	Total
• Bobcats	14	17	0	7	38
Warhawks	7	7	3	0	17

- Date: September 19
- Location: Malone Stadium
  Monroe, Louisiana
- Game start: 6:30 p.m. CDT
- Elapsed time: 3 hours and 23 minutes
- Game attendance: 5,816
- Game weather: 78 °F (26 °C) • Weather: Partly Cloudy • Wind: 11 NE MPH
- Referee: Wayne Winkler
- TV announcers (ESPNU): Roy Philpott (play–by–play) and Kelly Stouffer (analyst)

Scoring summary
1	11:21	TXST	Calvin Hill 4-yard rush (Seth Keller kick) (10 plays, 85 yards, 3:39)	TXST 7–0
1	02:52	ULM	Jevin Frett 20-yard pass from Colby Suits (Davis Hughes kick) (7 plays, 49 yards, 3:03)	TIE 7–7
1	00:43	TXST	Jeremiah Haydel 32-yard pass from Tyler Vitt (Seth Keller kick) (6 plays, 75 yards, 2:09)	TXST 14–7
2	12:04	TXST	Tyler Vitt 8-yard rush (Seth Keller kick) (7 plays, 62 yards, 2:31)	TXST 21–7
2	06:17	TXST	Seth Keller 40-yard field goal (6 plays, 20 yards, 2:29)	TXST 24–7
2	01:34	ULM	Chandler Whitfield 5-yard pass from Colby Suits (Davis Hughes kick) (11 plays, 75 yards, 4:43)	TXST 24–14
2	01:23	TXST	Jeremiah Haydel 75-yard pass from Tyler Vitt (Seth Keller kick) (1 play, 75 yards, 0:11)	TXST 31–14
3	08:42	ULM	Davis Hughes 28-yard field goal (6 plays, 27 yards, 2:57)	TXST 31–17
4	00:53	TXST	Jarron Morris 100-yard interception returned (Seth Keller kick) (13 plays, 85 yards, 3:36)	TXST 38–17

Statistics	TXST	ULM
First downs	20	25
Total yards	398	444
Rushing yards	142	67
Passing yards	256	377
Turnovers	1	2
Time of possession	26:47	33:13

Team	Category	Player	Statistics
Texas State	Passing	Tyler Vitt	14/21, 256 yards, 2 TD
Texas State	Rushing	Tyler Vitt	11 carries, 82 yards, TD
Texas State	Receiving	Jeremiah Haydel	6 receptions, 152 yards, 2 TD
Louisiana–Monroe	Passing	Colby Suits	35/53, 377 yards, 2 TD, INT
Louisiana–Monroe	Rushing	Josh Johnson	17 carries, 51 yards
Louisiana–Monroe	Receiving	Perry Carter Jr.	8 receptions, 98 yards

=== At Boston College ===
Texas State at Boston College

Team	1	2	3	4	Total
Bobcats	7	7	7	0	21
• Eagles	0	7	7	10	24

- Date: September 26
- Location: Alumni Stadium
  Chestnut Hill, Massachusetts
- Game start: 5:05 p.m. CDT
- Elapsed time: 3 hours and 15 minutes
- Game attendance: 0
- Game weather: 73 °F (23 °C) • Weather: Partly Cloudy • Wind: 7 SSE MPH
- Referee: Jeff Heaser
- TV announcers (FoxSports Southwest+): Evan Lepler (play–by–play), Charles Arbuckle (analyst), and Abby Labar (sideline reporter)

Scoring summary
1	03:44	TXST	Calvin Hill 1-yard rush (Seth Keller kick) (9 plays, 70 yards, 3:46)	TXST 7–0
2	13:28	BC	Phil Jurkovec 2-yard rush (Aaron Boumerhi kick) (4 plays, 6 yards, 1:32)	TIE 7–7
2	00:59	TXST	Marcell Barbee 6-yard pass from Brady McBride (Seth Keller kick) (11 plays, 86 yards, 4:18)	TXST 14–7
3	06:49	TXST	Marcell Barbee 9-yard pass from Brady McBride (Seth Keller kick) (13 plays, 87 yards, 6:04)	TXST 21–7
3	00:12	BC	Phil Jurkovec 3-yard rush (Aaron Boumerhi kick) (12 plays, 72 yards, 6:31)	TXST 21–14
4	1:11	BC	Hunter Long 5-yard pass from Phil Jurkovec (Aaron Boumerhi kick) (8 plays, 48 yards, 2:04)	TIE 21–21
4	00:03	BC	Aaron Boumerhi 36-yard field goal (7 plays, 49 yards, 0:44)	BC 24–21

Statistics	TXST	BC
First downs	21	22
Total yards	352	297
Rushing yards	128	87
Passing yards	229	210
Turnovers	1	1
Time of possession	31:00	29:00

Team	Category	Player	Statistics
Texas State	Passing	Brady McBride	19/29, 229 yards, 2 TD, INT
Texas State	Rushing	Calvin Hill	12 carries, 49 yards, TD
Texas State	Receiving	Drue Jackson	3 receptions, 54 yards
Boston College	Passing	Phil Jurkovec	26/38, 210 yards, TD, INT
Boston College	Rushing	Phil Jurkovec	8 carries, 37 yards, 2 TD
Boston College	Receiving	Hunter Long	9 receptions, 81 yards, TD

=== At Troy ===
Texas State at Troy

Team	1	2	3	4	Total
Bobcats	3	0	7	7	17
• Trojans	6	17	7	7	37

- Date: October 10
- Location: Veterans Memorial Stadium
  Troy, Alabama
- Game start: 2:35 p.m. CDT
- Elapsed time: 3 hours and 25 minutes
- Game attendance: 10,500
- Game weather: 76 °F (24 °C) • Weather: Humid • Wind: N 13 MPH
- Referee: Wayne Winkler
- TV announcers (ESPN3): Will Kollmeyer (play–by–play) and Ben Stanfield (analyst)

Scoring summary
1	11:18	TXST	Seth Keller 38-yard field goal (7 plays, 14 yards, 2:11)	TXST 3–0
1	02:08	TROY	Reggie Todd 30-yard pass from Gunnar Watson (Evan Legassey PAT blocked) (5 plays, 80 yards, 2:20)	TROY 6–3
2	11:50	TROY	Reggie Todd 19-yard from Gunnar Watson (Evan Legassey kick) (11 plays, 76 yards, 4:47)	TROY 13–3
2	07:22	TROY	Kaylon Geiger 38-yard pass from Gunnar Watson (Evan Legassey kick) (6 plays, 67 yards, 2:36)	TROY 20–3
2	03:06	TROY	Evan Legassey 46-yard field goal (4 plays, 4 yards, 1:17)	TROY 23–3
3	07:31	TXST	Blake Aragon 4-yard pass from Brady McBride (Seth Keller kick) (8 plays, 49 yards, 3:18)	TROY 23–10
3	03:19	TROY	Tray Eafford 11-yard pass from Gunnar Watson (Evan Legassey kick) (5 plays, 51 yards, 1:52)	TROY 30–10
4	09:17	TROY	B. J. Smith 2-yard rush (Evan Legassey kick) (5 plays, 66 yards, 2:24)	TROY 37–10
4	00:38	TXST	Jahmyl Jeter 6-yard rush (Seth Keller kick) (10 plays, 80 yards, 3:01)	TROY 37–17

Statistics	TXST	TROY
First downs	15	26
Total yards	254	488
Rushing yards	161	150
Passing yards	93	338
Turnovers	1	0
Time of possession	25:59	34:01

Team	Category	Player	Statistics
Texas State	Passing	Brady McBride	15/28, 93 yards, TD
Texas State	Rushing	Calvin Hill	6 carries, 57 yards
Texas State	Receiving	Javen Banks	1 reception, 17 yards
Troy	Passing	Gunnar Watson	33/46, 338 yards, 4 TD
Troy	Rushing	Kimani Vidal	12 carries, 106 yards
Troy	Receiving	Kaylon Geiger	7 receptions, 121 yards, TD

=== At South Alabama ===
Texas State at South Alabama

Team	1	2	3	4	Total
Bobcats	7	3	7	3	20
• Jaguars	3	14	0	13	30

- Date: October 17
- Location: Hancock Whitney Stadium
  Mobile, Alabama
- Game start: 11:00 a.m. CDT
- Elapsed time: 3 hours and 29 minutes
- Game attendance: 5,142
- Game weather: 65 °F (18 °C) • Weather: Sunny • Wind: NNE 11 MPH
- Referee: T. Livingston
- TV announcers (ESPNU): Clay Matvick (play–by–play) and Rocky Boiman (analyst)

Scoring summary
1	06:53	USA	Diego Guajardo 33-yard field goal (10 plays, 50 yards, 4:04)	USA 3–0
1	04:07	TXST	Jackson Lanam 9-yard pass from Brady McBride (Seth Keller kick) (9 plays, 65 yards, 2:46)	TXST 7–3
2	13:19	USA	Carlos Davis 1-yard rush (Diego Guajardo kick) (14 plays, 75 yards, 5:48)	USA 10–7
2	04:48	TXST	Seth Keller 30-yard field goal (8 plays, 27 yards, 2:30)	TIE 10–10
2	00:12	USA	Jalen Tolbert 1-yard pass from Chance Lovertich (Diego Guajardo kick) (14 plays, 75 yards, 5:48)	USA 17–10
3	07:57	TXST	Brock Sturges 1-yard rush (Seth Keller kick) (3 plays, 50 yards, 0:48)	TIE 17–17
4	14:01	USA	Diego Guajardo 24-yard field goal (10 plays, 54 yards, 4:34)	USA 20–17
4	10:30	TXST	Seth Keller 41-yard field goal (8 plays, 41 yards, 3:31)	TIE 20–20
4	07:10	USA	Kawaan Baker 8-yard from Desmond Trotter (Diego Guajardo kick) (10 plays, 75 yards, 3:20)	USA 27–20
4	01:09	USA	Diego Guajardo 44-yard field goal (10 plays, 46 yards, 4:00)	USA 30–20

Statistics	TXST	USA
First downs	22	24
Total yards	348	385
Rushing yards	88	132
Passing yards	260	253
Turnovers	0	0
Time of possession	25:52	34:08

Team	Category	Player	Statistics
Texas State	Passing	Brady McBride	28/40, 260 yards, TD
Texas State	Rushing	Jahmyl Jeter	5 carries, 31 yards
Texas State	Receiving	Jah'Marae Sheread	4 receptions, 72 yards
South Alabama	Passing	Desmond Trotter	18/22, 187 yards, TD
South Alabama	Rushing	Carlos Davis	32 yards, 113 yards, TD
South Alabama	Receiving	Jalen Tolbert	9 receptions, 91 yards, TD

=== At No. 11 BYU ===
Texas State at BYU

Team	1	2	3	4	Total
Bobcats	7	0	0	7	14
• No. 11 Cougars	14	21	14	3	52

- Date: October 24
- Location: LaVell Edwards Stadium
  Provo, Utah
- Game start: 9:25 p.m. CDT
- Elapsed time: 3 hours and 12 minutes
- Game attendance: 6,570
- Game weather: 57 °F (14 °C) • Weather: Partly cloudy • Winds: SW 2 mph
- Referee: Michael Vandervelde
- TV announcers (ESPN): Dave Flemming (play–by–play), Rod Gilmore (analyst), and Stormy Buonantony (sideline reporter)

Scoring summary
1	11:33	TXST	Marcell Barbee 19-yard pass from Brady McBride (Seth Keller kick) (8 plays, 75 yards, 3:27)	TXST 7–0
1	07:03	BYU	Lopini Katoa 4-yard rush (Jake Oldroyd kick) (10 plays, 86 yards, 4:30)	TIE 7–7
1	01:43	BYU	Keanu Hill 32-yard pass from Zach Wilson (Jake Oldroyd kick) (7 plays, 90 yards, 3:03)	BYU 14–7
2	12:35	BYU	Tyler Allgeier 11-yard rush (Jake Oldroyd kick) (6 plays, 60 yards, 2:37)	BYU 21–7
2	07:47	BYU	Isaac Rex 3-yard pass from Zach Wilson (Jake Oldroyd kick) (11 plays, 71 yards, 3:56)	BYU 28–7
2	00:27	BYU	Dax Milne 45-yard pass from Zach Wilson (Jake Oldroyd kick) (7 plays, 94 yards, 2:16)	BYU 35–7
3	10:47	BYU	Isaac Rex 30-yard pass from Zach Wilson (Jake Oldroyd kick) (10 plays, 60 yards, 2:37)	BYU 42–7
3	9:50	BYU	Isaiah Kaufusi 32-yard interception returned (Jake Oldroyd kick) (3 plays, −6 yards, 0:57)	BYU 49–7
4	08:09	TXST	Marcell Barbee 20-yard pass from Brady McBride (Seth Keller kick) (8 plays, 96 yards, 4:11)	BYU 52–14

Statistics	TXST	BYU
First downs	15	30
Total yards	267	579
Rushing yards	117	227
Passing yards	150	352
Turnovers	2	2
Time of possession	25:49	34:11

Team	Category	Player	Statistics
Texas State	Passing	Brady McBride	17/30, 160 yards, 2 TD, 2 INT
Texas State	Rushing	Brock Sturges	8 carries, 58 yards
Texas State	Receiving	Marcell Barbee	3 receptions, 48 yards, 2 TD
BYU	Passing	Zach Wilson	19/25, 287 yards, 4 TD
BYU	Rushing	Tyler Allgeier	12 carries, 76 yards, TD
BYU	Receiving	Dax Milne	4 receptions, 89 yards, TD

=== Louisiana ===
Louisiana at Texas State

Team	1	2	3	4	Total
• Ragin' Cajuns	14	20	3	7	44
Bobcats	14	7	6	7	34

- Date: October 31
- Location: Bobcat Stadium
  San Marcos, Texas
- Game start: 7:02 p.m. CDT
- Elapsed time: 3 hours and 33 minutes
- Game attendance: 7,500
- Game weather: 69 °F (21 °C) • Weather: Clear Skies • Wind: S 6 MPH
- Referee: Marshall Lewis
- TV announcers (ESPNU): Mike Couzens (play–by–play) and Rene Ingoglia (analyst)

Scoring summary
1	11:54	LA	Trey Ragas 3-yard rush (Nate Snyder kick) (5 plays, 47 yards, 2:01)	LA 7–0
1	10:54	LA	Calif Gossett 46-yard pass from Levi Lewis (Nate Snyder kick) (1 play, 46 yards, 2:01)	LA 14–0
1	07:20	TXST	Seth Keller 12-yard rush (Seth Keller kick) (9 plays, 84 yards, 3:28)	LA 14–7
1	00:42	TXST	Jahmyl Jeter 1-yard rush (Seth Keller kick) (5 plays, 35 yards, 1:30)	TIE 14–14
2	11:40	TXST	Marcell Barbee 33-yard pass from Brady McBride (Seth Keller kick) (5 plays, 74 yards, 2:00)	TXST 21–14
2	07:21	LA	Levi Lewis 12-yard rush (Nate Snyder kick); 10 plays, 75 yards, 4:19)	TIE 21–21
2	01:23	LA	Trey Ragas 2-yard rush (Nate Snyder kick) (6 plays, 64 yards, 1:03)	LA 28–21
2	00:07	LA	Kyren Lacy 1-yard pass from Levi Lewis (Nate Snyder PAT failed) (7 plays, 62 yards, 0:47)	LA 34–21
3	13:33	LA	Nate Snyder 42-yard field goal (5 plays, 52 yards, 1:27)	LA 37–21
3	03:26	TXST	Brock Sturges 10-yard rush (two-point pass conversion attempt failed) (7 plays, 62 yards, 2:01)	LA 37–27
4	10:15	LA	Trey Ragas 7-yard rush (Nate Snyder kick) (10 plays, 56 yards, 4:49)	LA 44–27
4	01:50	LA	Brock Sturges 18-yard rush (Seth Keller kick) (7 plays, 60 yards, 2:35)	LA 44–34

Statistics	ULL	TXST
First downs	31	26
Total yards	614	382
Rushing yards	282	204
Passing yards	332	178
Turnovers	4	3
Time of possession	33:06	26:54

Team	Category	Player	Statistics
Louisiana	Passing	Levi Lewis	22/32, 332 yards, 2 TD, 1 IN
Louisiana	Rushing	Trey Ragas	19 carries, 131 yards, 3 TD
Louisiana	Receiving	Jalen Williams	3 receptions, 85 yards
Texas State	Passing	Brady McBride	14/32, 166 yards, TD, 3 INT
Texas State	Rushing	Brock Sturges	17 carries, 128 yards, 2 TD
Texas State	Receiving	Marcell Barbee	2 receptions, 62 yards, TD

=== Appalachian State ===
Appalachian State at Texas State

Team	1	2	3	4	Total
• Mountaineers	14	10	0	14	38
Bobcats	7	3	0	7	17

- Date: November 7
- Location: Bobcat Stadium
  San Marcos, Texas
- Game start: 2:05 p.m. CST
- Elapsed time: 3 hours and 6 minutes
- Game attendance: 6,745
- Game weather: 81 °F (27 °C) • Weather: Partly Cloudy • Wind: SE 7 MPH
- Referee: Wayne Winkler
- TV announcers (ESPN+): Brant Freeman (play–by–play) and Steven Foster (analyst)

Scoring summary
1	14:16	TXST	Javen Banks 75-yard pass from Tyler Vitt (Seth Keller kick) (3 plays, 75 yards, 0:44)	TXST 7–0
1	11:08	APST	Miller Gibbs 32-yard pass from Zac Thomas (Chandler Staton kick) (7 plays, 72 yards, 3:03)	TIE 7–7
1	01:04	APST	Brendan Harrington 49-yard interception returned (Chandler Staton kick) (3 plays, 12 yards, 0:56)	APST 14–7
2	12:20	TXST	Seth Keller 42-yard field goal (7 plays, 51 yards, 3:44)	APST 14–10
2	07:09	APST	Caleb Spurlin 1-yard pass from Zac Thomas (Chandler Staton kick) (11 plays, 75 yards, 5:11)	APST 21–10
2	00:15	APST	Chandler Staton 33-yard field goal (11 plays, 50 yards, 2:09)	APST 24–10
4	14:16	APST	Jalen Virgil 9-yard pass from Zac Thomas (Chandler Staton kick) (16 plays, 91 yards, 7:26)	APST 31–10
4	11:20	TXST	Marcell Barbee 14-yard pass from Tyler Vitt (Seth Keller kick) (8 plays, 75 yards, 2:56)	APST 31–17
4	05:59	APST	Camerun Peoples 32-yard rush (Chandler Staton kick) (3 plays, 47 yards, 1:32)	APST 38–17

Statistics	APP	TXST
First downs	22	21
Total yards	426	420
Rushing yards	258	215
Passing yards	168	205
Turnovers	0	2
Time of possession	32:15	27:45

Team	Category	Player	Statistics
Appalachian State	Passing	Zac Thomas	18/27, 168 yards, 3 TD
Appalachian State	Rushing	Daetrich Harrington	18 carries, 113 yards
Appalachian State	Receiving	Miller Gibbs	3 receptions, 47 yards, TD
Texas State	Passing	Tyler Vitt	21/38, 205 yards, 2 TD, 2 INT
Texas State	Rushing	Jahmyl Jeter	11 carries, 135 yards
Texas State	Receiving	Javen Banks	4 receptions, 89 yards, TD

=== At Georgia Southern ===
Texas State at Georgia Southern

Team	1	2	3	4	Total
Bobcats	7	14	7	10	38
• Eagles	17	10	3	10	40

- Date: November 14
- Location: Paulson Stadium
  Statesboro, Georgia
- Game start: 2:35 p.m. CST
- Elapsed time: 3 hours and 11 minutes
- Game attendance: 4,478
- Referee: T. Livingston
- TV announcers (ESPN3): Matt Stewart (play–by–play) and Danny Waugh (analyst)

Scoring summary
1	12:59	GASO	Shai Werts 1-yard rush (Alex Raynor kick) (2 plays, 7 yards, 0:42)	GASO 7–0
1	12:44	TXST	Jeremiah Haydel 97-yard kickoff returned (Seth Keller kick) (0 plays, 0 yards, 0:00)	TIE 7–7
1	08:25	GASO	Shai Werts 29-yard rush (Alex Raynor kick) (8 plays, 75 yards, 4:19)	GASO 14–7
1	06:05	GASO	Alex Raynor 34-yard field goal (4 plays, −5 yards, 2:13)	GASO 17–7
2	12:09	GASO	Alex Raynor 41-yard field goal (5 plays, 42 yards, 2:44)	GASO 20–7
2	07:30	TXST	Calvin Hill 11-yard rush (Seth Keller kick) (11 plays, 75 yards, 4:39)	GASO 20–14
2	07:13	TXST	Marcell Barbee 43-yard pass from Tyler Vitt (Seth Keller kick) (1 play, 43 yards, 0:07)	TXST 21–20
2	01:08	GASO	Shai Werts 2-yard rush (Alex Raynor kick) (5 plays, 41 yards, 2:30)	GASO 27–21
3	07:09	GASO	Alex Raynor 39-yard field goal (14 plays, 53 yards, 7:51)	GASO 30–21
3	06:09	TXST	Javen Banks 59-yard pass from Brady McBride (Seth Keller kick) (3 plays, 65 yards, 1:06)	GASO 30–28
4	14:22	GASO	Wesley Kennedy III 6-yard rush (Alex Raynor kick) (12 plays, 75 yards, 6:41)	GASO 37–28
4	10:18	TXST	Seth Keller 27-yard field goal (10 plays, 57 yards, 3:58)	GASO 37–31
4	04:15	GASO	Alex Raynor 20-yard field goal (10 plays, 76 yards, 5:57)	GASO 40–31
4	02:50	TXST	Jah'Marae Sheread 24-yard pass from Brady McBride (Seth Keller kick) (4 plays, 79 yards, 1:19)	GASO 40–38

Statistics	TXST	GASO
First downs	18	20
Total yards	299	437
Rushing yards	30	386
Passing yards	269	51
Turnovers	3	3
Time of possession	18:41	41:19

Team	Category	Player	Statistics
Texas State	Passing	Brady McBride	7/13, 155 yards, 2 TD
Texas State	Rushing	Brock Sturges	6 carries, 31 yards
Texas State	Receiving	Marcell Barbee	5 receptions, 71 yards, TD
Georgia Southern	Passing	Shai Werts	6/9, 51 yards, INT
Georgia Southern	Rushing	Shai Werts	21 carries, 120 yards, 3 TD
Georgia Southern	Receiving	Wesley Kennedy III	1 reception, 23 yards

=== Arkansas State ===
Arkansas State at Texas State

Team	1	2	3	4	Total
Red Wolves	3	21	7	14	45
• Bobcats	10	17	0	20	47

- Date: November 21
- Location: Bobcat Stadium
  San Marcos, Texas
- Game start: 11:02 a.m. CDT
- Elapsed time: 3 hours and 32 minutes
- Game attendance: 5,218
- Game weather: 72 °F (22 °C) • Weather: Partly Cloudy • Wind: ESE 7 MPH
- Referee: Jeremy Parker
- TV announcers (ESPN2): John Schriffen (play–by–play) and Jay Walker (analyst)

Scoring summary
1	12:19	TXST	Javen Banks 40-yard pass from Brady McBride (Seth Keller kick) (6 plays, 75 yards, 2:41)	TXST 7–0
1	12:19	TXST	Seth Keller 41-yard field goal (7 plays, 45 yards, 2:49)	TXST 10–0
1	03:47	ARST	Blake Grupe 40-yard field goal (7 plays, 65 yards, 2:33)	TXST 10–3
2	12:59	ARST	Jonathan Adams Jr. 13-yard pass from Logan Bonner (Blake Grupe kick) (10 plays, 70 yards, 4:27)	TIE 10–10
2	11:52	TXST	Jeremiah Haydel 47-yard pass from Brady McBride (Seth Keller kick) (3 plays, 76 yards, 1:01)	TXST 17–10
2	09:56	TXST	Trevis Graham Jr. 14-yard pass from Brady McBride (Seth Keller kick); 2 plays, 35 yards, 0:36)	TXST 24–10
2	05:04	ARST	Marcel Murray 1-yard rush (Blake Grupe kick) (12 plays, 75 yards, 4:52)	TXST 24–17
2	00:16	ARST	Jonathan Adams Jr. 30-yard pass from Layne Hatcher (Blake Grupe kick) (10 plays, 91 yards, 3:55)	TIE 24–24
2	00:00	TXST	Seth Keller 48-yard field goal (4 plays, 44 yards, 0:16)	TXST 27–24
3	08:18	ARST	Jeff Foreman 84-yard pass from Layne Hatcher (Blake Grupe kick) (3 plays, 84 yards, 1:41)	ARST 31–27
4	13:50	ARST	Giles Amos 8-yard pass from Logan Bonner (Blake Grupe kick) (13 plays, 96 yards, 5:57)	ARST 38–27
4	11:39	TXST	Marcell Barbee 5-yard pass from Brady McBride (Seth Keller kick) (5 plays, 69 yards, 2:11)	ARST 38–34
4	07:01	TXST	Trevis Graham Jr. 15-yard pass from Brady McBride (Seth Keller kick) (7 plays, 74 yards, 2:58)	TXST 41–38
4	01:43	TXST	Jamal Jones 1-yard rush (Blake Grupe kick) (12 plays, 65 yards, 5:09)	ARST 45–41
4	00:34	TXST	Calvin Hill 6-yard rush (Seth Keller kick) (7 plays, 57 yards, 1:02)	TXST 47–45

Statistics	ARST	TXST
First downs	30	27
Total yards	654	505
Rushing yards	192	62
Passing yards	462	443
Turnovers	1	0
Time of possession	37:37	22:23

Team	Category	Player	Statistics
Arkansas State	Passing	Layne Hatcher	10/22, 254 yards, 2 TD
Arkansas State	Rushing	Jamal Jones	16 carries, 106 yards, TD
Arkansas State	Receiving	Jeff Foreman	3 receptions, 148 yards, TD
Texas State	Passing	Brady McBride	32/45, 443 yards, 5 TD
Texas State	Rushing	Calvin Hill	6 carries, 49 yards, TD
Texas State	Receiving	Jeremiah Haydel	5 receptions, 94 yards, TD

=== No. 20 Coastal Carolina ===
Coastal Carolina at Texas State

Team	1	2	3	4	Total
• No. 20 Chanticleers	14	21	7	7	49
Bobcats	7	0	0	7	14

- Date: November 28
- Location: Bobcat Stadium
  San Marcos, Texas
- Game start: 2:05 p.m. CST
- Elapsed time: 2 hours and 50 minutes
- Game attendance: 3,245
- Game weather: 59 °F (15 °C) • Weather: Cloudy, Light Rain • Wind: NNE 8 MPH
- Referee: Marshall Lewis
- TV announcers (ESPN+): Brant Freeman (play–by–play) and Keith Moreland (analyst)

Scoring summary
1	10:46	CCU	CJ Marable 14-yard rush (Massimo Biscardi kick) (7 plays, 81 yards, 2:43)	CCU 7–0
1	07:08	CCU	CJ Marable 9-yard rush (Massimo Biscardi kick); 5 plays, 45 yards, 2:31)	CCU 14–0
1	04:33	TXST	Javen Banks 14-yard pass from Brady McBride (Seth Keller kick) (7 plays, 77 yards, 2:30)	CCU 14–7
2	09:54	CCU	Reese White 10-yard rush (Massimo Biscardi kick) (8 plays, 55 yards, 3:41)	CCU 21–7
2	04:19	CCU	Jaivon Heiligh 14-yard pass from Grayson McCall (Massimo Biscardi kick) (7 plays, 78 yards, 3:37)	CCU 28–7
2	00:25	CCU	Jaivon Heiligh 7-yard pass from Grayson McCall (Massimo Biscardi kick) (8 plays, 77 yards, 2:32)	CCU 35–7
3	10:01	CCU	CJ Marable 23-yard rush (Massimo Biscardi kick) (9 plays, 75 yards, 4:59)	CCU 42–7
4	09:00	CCU	Baden Pinson 9-yard rus (Kieran Colahan kick) (13 plays, 94 yards, 7:11)	CCU 49–7
4	06:08	TXST	Jahmyl Jeter 5-yard rush (Seth Keller kick) (5 plays, 66 yards, 2:46)	CCU 49–14

Statistics	CCU	TXST
First downs	32	13
Total yards	572	318
Rushing yards	406	116
Passing yards	116	202
Turnovers	0	1
Time of possession	37:31	22:29

Team	Category	Player	Statistics
Coastal Carolina	Passing	Grayson McCall	11/18, 154 yards, 2 TD
Coastal Carolina	Rushing	C. J. Marable	16 carries, 157 yards, 3 TD
Coastal Carolina	Receiving	Isaiah Likely	4 receptions, 73 yards
Texas State	Passing	Brady McBride	20/26, 202 yards, TD
Texas State	Rushing	Jahyml Jeter	7 carries, 47 yards, TD
Texas State	Receiving	Calvin Hill	3 receptions, 68 yards
