= 2020 Louisiana–Monroe Warhawks football team =

American college football season

2020 Louisiana–Monroe Warhawks football
- Conference: Sun Belt Conference
- West Division
- Record: 0–10 (0–7 Sun Belt)
- Head coach: Matt Viator (5th season)
- Offensive coordinator: Eman Naghavi (1st season)
- Offensive scheme: Spread
- Defensive coordinator: Scott Stoker (interim; 1st season)
- Base defense: 4–2–5
- Home stadium: Malone Stadium

2020 Sun Belt Conference football standings
	Conf.			Overall
Team	W		L	W		L
East Division
No. 14 Coastal Carolina xy+	8	–	0	11	–	1
Appalachian State	6	–	2	9	–	3
Georgia Southern	4	–	4	8	–	5
Georgia State	4	–	4	6	–	4
Troy	3	–	4	5	–	6
West Division
No. 15 Louisiana xy+	7	–	1	10	–	1
South Alabama	3	–	5	4	–	7
Arkansas State	2	–	6	4	–	7
Texas State	2	–	6	2	–	10
Louisiana–Monroe	0	–	7	0	–	10
Championship: Louisiana at Coastal Carolina (Canceled)
+ – Conference co-champions; x – Division champion/co-champions; y – Championship game participant; Rankings from AP Poll

The 2020 Louisiana–Monroe Warhawks football team represented the University of Louisiana at Monroe in the 2020 NCAA Division I FBS football season. The Warhawks played their home games at Malone Stadium in Monroe, Louisiana, and competed in the West Division of the Sun Belt Conference. They were led by fifth-year head coach Matt Viator. After the team played to an 0–10 record (0–7 in conference play), Viator was fired on December 7 in what was the worst season in the history of the program. Not only did the team finish winless for only the third time in its history, but that was combined with 10 losses for the most losses in a winless season. Also, the 50 point loss to Louisiana, their main rival, was the largest margin of defeat suffered in the history of the rivalry for either squad.

== Preseason ==
=== Recruiting class ===
College recruiting information
Name	Hometown	School	Height	Weight	40^{‡}	Commit date
Taylor Behl; Linebacker	Georgetown, TX	Georgetown HS	6 ft 1 in (1.85 m)	225 lb (102 kg)	-	Dec 18, 2019
Taylor Behl; Linebacker	Recruit ratings: Scout: Rivals: 247Sports: ESPN:					
Dillon Brooks; Offensive Lineman	Huntsville, TX	Huntsville HS; Tyler JC	6 ft 3 in (1.91 m)	295 lb (134 kg)	-	Dec 18, 2019
Dillon Brooks; Offensive Lineman	Recruit ratings: Scout: Rivals: 247Sports: ESPN:					
Keydrain Calligan; Safety	New Iberia, LA	Westgate HS	6 ft 2 in (1.88 m)	190 lb (86 kg)	-	Dec 18, 2019
Keydrain Calligan; Safety	Recruit ratings: Scout: Rivals: 247Sports: ESPN:					
Coby Cavil; Wide Receiver	Cedar Hill, TX	Red Oak HS	5 ft 9 in (1.75 m)	170 lb (77 kg)	-	Dec 18, 2019
Coby Cavil; Wide Receiver	Recruit ratings: Scout: Rivals: 247Sports: ESPN:					
Hayes Crockett; Quarterback	Monroe, LA	Sterlington HS	6 ft 4 in (1.93 m)	206 lb (93 kg)	-	Dec 18, 2019
Hayes Crockett; Quarterback	Recruit ratings: Scout: Rivals: 247Sports: ESPN:					
Peyton Dunn; Offensive Lineman	Brandon, MS	Jackson Prep	6 ft 7 in (2.01 m)	285 lb (129 kg)	-	Dec 18, 2019
Peyton Dunn; Offensive Lineman	Recruit ratings: Scout: Rivals: 247Sports: ESPN:					
Elijah Fisher; Defensive End	Allen, TX	Allen HS	6 ft 3 in (1.91 m)	255 lb (116 kg)	-	Dec 18, 2019
Elijah Fisher; Defensive End	Recruit ratings: Scout: Rivals: 247Sports: ESPN:					
Jevin Frett; Wide Receiver	Manchester, CT	Manchester HS; Monroe College	6 ft 3 in (1.91 m)	195 lb (88 kg)	-	Dec 24, 2019
Jevin Frett; Wide Receiver	Recruit ratings: Scout: Rivals: 247Sports: ESPN:					
Zac Gulley; Safety	Newton, TX	Newton HS	5 ft 10 in (1.78 m)	180 lb (82 kg)	-	Dec 18, 2019
Zac Gulley; Safety	Recruit ratings: Scout: Rivals: 247Sports: ESPN:					
Nate Heidecker; Offensive Lineman	Conroe, TX	College Park HS	6 ft 5 in (1.96 m)	275 lb (125 kg)	-	Dec 18, 2019
Nate Heidecker; Offensive Lineman	Recruit ratings: Scout: Rivals: 247Sports: ESPN:					
Jeremy Hunt; Quarterback	Oak Park, IL	River Forest HS; Central Missouri; Trinity Valley CC	6 ft 3 in (1.91 m)	215 lb (98 kg)	-	Dec 18, 2019
Jeremy Hunt; Quarterback	Recruit ratings: Scout: Rivals: 247Sports: ESPN:					
Javarian Jenkins; Linebacker	Hattiesburg, MS	Oak Grove HS	6 ft 3 in (1.91 m)	205 lb (93 kg)	-	Feb 5, 2020
Javarian Jenkins; Linebacker	Recruit ratings: Scout: Rivals: 247Sports: ESPN:					
Garrett Kahmann; Quarterback	West Monroe, LA	West Monroe HS	6 ft 3 in (1.91 m)	200 lb (91 kg)	-	Dec 18, 2019
Garrett Kahmann; Quarterback	Recruit ratings: Scout: Rivals: 247Sports: ESPN:					
Quincy Ledet Jr. Defensive Tackle	Orange, TX	West Orange–Stark HS	6 ft 3 in (1.91 m)	285 lb (129 kg)	-	Dec 18, 2019
Quincy Ledet Jr. Defensive Tackle	Recruit ratings: Scout: Rivals: 247Sports: ESPN:					
Marcus Moore; Defensive Tackle	The Colony, TX	The Colony HS	6 ft 2 in (1.88 m)	275 lb (125 kg)	-	Dec 18, 2019
Marcus Moore; Defensive Tackle	Recruit ratings: Scout: Rivals: 247Sports: ESPN:					
Ja'Korian Newsome; Linebacker	Petal, MS	Petal HS	6 ft 2 in (1.88 m)	200 lb (91 kg)	-	Feb 5, 2020
Ja'Korian Newsome; Linebacker	Recruit ratings: Scout: Rivals: 247Sports: ESPN:					
Tre Odom; Safety	Lufkin, TX	Lufkin HS	6 ft 3 in (1.91 m)	205 lb (93 kg)	-	Feb 5, 2020
Tre Odom; Safety	Recruit ratings: Scout: Rivals: 247Sports: ESPN:					
Noah Patty; Tight End	Aledo, TX	Nolan Catholic HS	6 ft 5 in (1.96 m)	225 lb (102 kg)	-	Feb 5, 2020
Noah Patty; Tight End	Recruit ratings: Scout: Rivals: 247Sports: ESPN:					
Jahmeel Rice; Wide Receiver	Copperas Cove, TX	Copperas Cove HS	6 ft 3 in (1.91 m)	190 lb (86 kg)	-	Dec 18, 2019
Jahmeel Rice; Wide Receiver	Recruit ratings: Scout: Rivals: 247Sports: ESPN:					
D. J. Travis; Cornerback	Poplarville, MS	Poplarville HS; Jones College	6 ft 3 in (1.91 m)	190 lb (86 kg)	-	Dec 18, 2019
D. J. Travis; Cornerback	Recruit ratings: Scout: Rivals: 247Sports: ESPN:					

=== Sun Belt coaches poll ===
The Sun Belt preseason coaches poll was released on August 25, 2020. Louisiana–Monroe was picked to finish fifth in the West Division.

=== Preseason All-Sun Belt teams ===
The Warhawks had four players selected to the preseason All−Sun Belt teams; three from the offense and one from the defense.

Offense

1st team

- Josh Johnson – R-SR, Running Back
- Josh Pederson – R-SR, Tight End

2nd team

- T.J. Fiailoa – R-SR, Offensive Line

Defense

1st team

- Corey Straughter – SR, Defensive Back

== Schedule ==
Louisiana–Monroe will play host to conference foes Texas State, Georgia Southern, Appalachian State, and Louisiana. They will travel to Troy, South Alabama, Georgia State, and Arkansas State

Louisiana-Monroe had games against Arkansas, Cal Poly, and Georgia, which were canceled due to the COVID-19 pandemic.

Date	Time	Opponent	Site	TV	Result	Attendance
September 12	12:30 p.m.	at Army*	Michie Stadium; West Point, NY	CBSSN	L 7–37	5,362
September 19	6:30 p.m.	Texas State	Malone Stadium; Monroe, LA	ESPNU	L 17–38	5,816
September 26	2:30 p.m.	UTEP*	Malone Stadium; Monroe, LA	ESPN2	L 6–31	5,491
October 3	6:00 p.m.	Georgia Southern	Malone Stadium; Monroe, LA	ESPN+	L 30–35	6,338
October 10	11:00 a.m.	at Liberty*	Williams Stadium; Lynchburg, VA	ESPN2	L 7–40	1,000
October 24	6:00 p.m.	at South Alabama	Hancock Whitney Stadium; Mobile, AL	ESPN+	L 14–38	5,186
October 31	3:00 p.m.	Appalachian State	Malone Stadium; Monroe, LA	ESPNU	L 13–31	5,493
November 7	11:00 a.m.	at Georgia State	Center Parc Stadium; Atlanta, GA	ESPN3	L 34–52	2,921
November 28	2:00 p.m.	Louisiana	Malone Stadium; Monroe, LA (Battle on the Bayou)	ESPN3	L 20–70	3,132
December 5	2:00 p.m.	at Arkansas State	Centennial Bank Stadium; Jonesboro, AR	ESPN3	L 15–48	3,268
*Non-conference game; Rankings from AP Poll and CFP Rankings after November 24 released prior to game; All times are in Central time

Schedule source:

== Game summaries ==
=== At Army ===
Louisiana–Monroe at Army

Team	1	2	3	4	Total
Warhawks	0	7	0	0	7
• Black Knights	14	3	13	7	37

- Date: September 12, 2020
- Location: Michie Stadium
  West Point, NY
- Game start: 12:30 p.m. CDT
- Elapsed time: 3 hours and 10 minutes
- Game attendance: 5,362
- Game weather: 71 °F (22 °C) • Weather: Mostly sunny • Wind: E 5 MPH
- Referee: Mike Roche
- TV announcers (CBSSN): Ben Holden (play-by-play), Ross Tucker (analyst) & Tina Cervasio (sideline)

Scoring summary
1	04:27	ARMY	Christian Anderson 5-yard rush (Landon Salyers kick) (15 plays, 60 yards, 8:13)	ARMY 7–0
1	01:47	ARMY	Sandon McCoy 2-yard rush (Landon Salyers kick) (4 plays, 61 yards, 1:01)	ARMY 14–0
2	02:12	ULM	Malik Jackson 6-yard pass from Colby Suits (Davis Hughes kick) (7 plays, 64 yards, 3:56)	ARMY 14–7
2	00:02	ARMY	Landon Salyers 40-yard field goal (3 plays, 24 yards, 0:25)	ARMY 17–7
3	06:22	ARMY	Christian Anderson 6-yard rush (Landon Salyers kick) (8 plays, 65 yards, 4:41)	ARMY 24–7
3	00:25	ARMY	Jakobi Buchanan 25-yard rush (Landon Salyers PAT failed) (7 plays, 54 yards, 3:38)	ARMY 30–7
4	05:58	ARMY	Jakobi Buchanan 40-yard rush (Quinn Maretzki kick) (9 plays, 72 yards, 5:38)	ARMY 37–7

Statistics	Louisiana–Monroe	Army
First downs	9	24
Total yards	200	465
Rushing yards	37	436
Passing yards	163	29
Turnovers	2	1
Time of possession	23:13	36:47

Team	Category	Player	Statistics
Louisiana–Monroe	Passing	Colby Suits	14/19, 148 yards, 1 TD
Louisiana–Monroe	Rushing	Josh Johnson	12 carries, 38 yards
Louisiana–Monroe	Receiving	Josh Pederson	5 receptions, 56 yards
Army	Passing	Jemel Jones	1/2, 29 yards
Army	Rushing	Jakobi Buchanan	11 carries, 106 yards, 2 TDs
Army	Receiving	Isaiah Alston	1 reception, 29 yards

=== Texas State ===
Texas State at Louisiana–Monroe

Team	1	2	3	4	Total
• Bobcats	14	17	0	7	38
Warhawks	7	7	3	0	17

- Date: September 19, 2020
- Location: Malone Stadium
  Monroe, LA
- Game start: 6:30 p.m. CDT
- Elapsed time: 3 hours and 23 minutes
- Game attendance: 5,816
- Game weather: 78 °F (26 °C) • Weather: Partly Cloudy • Wind: 11 NE MPH
- Referee: Wayne Winkler
- TV announcers (ESPNU): Roy Philpott (play–by–play) and Kelly Stouffer (analyst)

Scoring summary
1	11:21	TXST	Calvin Hill 4-yard rush (Seth Keller kick) (10 plays, 85 yards, 3:39)	TXST 7–0
1	02:52	ULM	Jevin Frett 20-yard pass from Colby Suits (Davis Hughes kick) (7 plays, 49 yards, 3:03)	TIE 7–7
1	00:43	TXST	Jeremiah Haydel 32-yard pass from Tyler Vitt (Seth Keller kick) (6 plays, 75 yards, 2:09)	TXST 14–7
2	12:04	TXST	Tyler Vitt 8-yard rush (Seth Keller kick) (7 plays, 62 yards, 2:31)	TXST 21–7
2	06:17	TXST	Seth Keller 40-yard field goal (6 plays, 20 yards, 2:29)	TXST 24–7
2	01:34	ULM	Chandler Whitfield 5-yard pass from Colby Suits (Davis Hughes kick) (11 plays, 75 yards, 4:43)	TXST 24–14
2	01:23	TXST	Jeremiah Haydel 75-yard pass from Tyler Vitt (Seth Keller kick) (1 play, 75 yards, 0:11)	TXST 31–14
3	08:42	ULM	Davis Hughes 28-yard field goal (6 plays, 27 yards, 2:57)	TXST 31–17
4	00:53	TXST	Jarron Morris 100-yard interception returned (Seth Keller kick) (13 plays, 85 yards, 3:36)	TXST 38–17

Statistics	Texas State	Louisiana–Monroe
First downs	20	25
Total yards	398	444
Rushing yards	142	67
Passing yards	256	377
Turnovers	1	2
Time of possession	26:47	33:13

Team	Category	Player	Statistics
Texas State	Passing	Tyler Vitt	14/21, 256 yards, 2 TDs
Texas State	Rushing	Tyler Vitt	11 carries, 82 yards, 1 TD
Texas State	Receiving	Jeremiah Haydel	6 receptions, 152 yards, 2 TDs
Louisiana–Monroe	Passing	Colby Suits	35/53, 377 yards, 2 TDs, 1 INT
Louisiana–Monroe	Rushing	Josh Johnson	17 carries, 51 yards
Louisiana–Monroe	Receiving	Perry Carter Jr.	8 receptions, 98 yards

=== UTEP ===
Texas–El Paso at Louisiana–Monroe

Team	1	2	3	4	Total
• Miners	7	17	0	7	31
Warhawks	0	0	6	0	6

- Date: September 26, 2020
- Location: Malone Stadium
  Monroe, LA
- Game start: 2:35 p.m. CDT
- Elapsed time: 3 hours and 12 minutes
- Game attendance: 5,491
- Game weather: 79 °F (26 °C) • Weather: Partly Cloudy • Wind: 6 WNWMPH
- Referee: Jeremy Parker
- TV announcers (ESPN2): Clay Matvick (play–by–play) and Rocky Boiman (analyst)

Scoring summary
1	07:40	UTEP	Deion Hankins 2-yard rush (Gavin Baechle kick) (3 plays, 86 yards, 1:35)	UTEP 7–0
2	13:33	UTEP	Deion Hankins 1-yard rush (Gavin Baechle kick) (6 plays, 68 yards, 2:21)	UTEP 14–0
2	06:57	UTEP	Deion Hankins 8-yard rush (Gavin Baechle kick) (9 plays, 73 yards, 4:15)	UTEP 21–0
2	00:21	UTEP	Gavin Baechle 42-yard field goal (9 plays, 38 yards, 5:14)	UTEP 24–0
3	00:55	ULM	Jahquan Bloomfield 35-yard pass from Colby Suits (Zach Elder PAT failed) (4 plays, 55 yards, 1:41)	UTEP 24–6
4	02:32	UTEP	Ronald Awatt 23-yard rush (Gavin Baechle kick) (3 plays, 31 yards, 1:27)	UTEP 31–6

Statistics	UTEP	Louisiana–Monroe
First downs	21	6
Total yards	512	193
Rushing yards	210	7
Passing yards	302	186
Turnovers	1	1
Time of possession	39:36	20:24

Team	Category	Player	Statistics
UTEP	Passing	Gavin Hardison	13/25, 302 yards
UTEP	Rushing	Deion Hankins	22 carries, 118 yards, 3 TDs
UTEP	Receiving	Justin Garrett	7 receptions, 120 yards
Louisiana–Monroe	Passing	Colby Suits	17/27, 184 yards, 1 TD, 1 INT
Louisiana–Monroe	Rushing	Josh Johnson	9 carries, 19 yards
Louisiana–Monroe	Receiving	Jevin Frett	2 receptions, 63 yards

=== Georgia Southern ===
Georgia Southern at Louisiana–Monroe

Team	1	2	3	4	Total
• Eagles	7	14	14	0	35
Warhawks	3	14	6	7	30

- Date: October 3, 2020
- Location: Malone Stadium
  Monroe, LA
- Game start: 6:05 p.m. CDT
- Elapsed time: 3 hours and 15 hours
- Game attendance: 6,338
- Game weather: 72 °F (22 °C) • Weather: Clear • Wind: 4 ESE MPH
- Referee: Tre. Livingston
- TV announcers (ESPN+): Chris Harris (play–by–play) and Mike Hammett (analyst)

Scoring summary
1	11:25	GASO	J. D. King 3-yard rush (Alex Raynor kick) (3 plays, 68 yards, 1:27)	GASO 7–0
1	03:21	ULM	Davis Hughes 34-yard field goal (9 plays, 40 yards, 4:14)	GASO 7–3
2	12:47	GASO	Wesley Kennedy III 4-yard rush (Alex Raynor kick) (11 plays, 81 yards, 5:34)	GASO 14–3
2	10:04	ULM	Josh Johnson 26-yard rush (Davis Hughes kick) (6 plays, 72 yards, 2:43)	GASO 14–10
2	01:37	GASO	Wesley Kennedy III 5-yard rush (Alex Raynor kick) (15 plays, 75 yards, 8:27)	GASO 21–10
2	00:00	ULM	Malik Jackson 2-yard pass from Colby Suits (Davis Hughes kick) (11 plays, 75 yards, 1:37)	GASO 21–17
3	10:19	GASO	Logan Wright 17-yard rush (Alex Raynor kick) (9 plays, 75 yards, 4:41)	GASO 28–17
3	05:30	GASO	Rashad Byrd 7-yard blocked punt returned (Alex Raynor kick) (3 plays, 0 yards, 0:55)	GASO 35–17
3	00:29	ULM	Josh Johnson 2-yard pass from Colby Suits (Davis Hughes PAT failed) (13 plays, 73 yards, 5:01)	GASO 35–23
4	04:59	ULM	Josh Johnson 2-yard rush (Davis Hughes kick) (8 plays, 80 yards, 3:13)	GASO 35–30

Statistics	Georgia Southern	Louisiana–Monroe
First downs	19	24
Total yards	369	426
Rushing yards	340	92
Passing yards	29	334
Turnovers	0	0
Time of possession	34:53	25:07

Team	Category	Player	Statistics
Georgia Southern	Passing	Shai Werts	3/7, 29 yards
Georgia Southern	Rushing	J. D. King	21 carries, 196 yards, 1 TD
Georgia Southern	Receiving	Beau Johnson	1 reception, 17 yards
Louisiana–Monroe	Passing	Colby Suits	31/54, 334 yards, 2 TDs
Louisiana–Monroe	Rushing	Colby Suits	7 carries, 51 yards
Louisiana–Monroe	Receiving	Tyler Lamm	5 receptions, 66 yards

=== At Liberty ===
Louisiana–Monroe at Liberty

Team	1	2	3	4	Total
Warhawks	0	0	0	7	7
• Flames	14	10	7	9	40

- Date: October 10, 2020
- Location: Williams Stadium
  Lynchburg, VA
- Game start: 11:02 a.m. CDT
- Elapsed time: 3 hours and 10 minutes
- Game attendance:
- Game weather: 63 °F (17 °C) • Weather: Rainy • Wind: SW 5 MPH
- Referee: Jeff Heaser
- TV announcers (ESPN2): Mike Couzens (play–by–play), Jay Walker (analyst), and Taylor Davis (sideline reporter)

Scoring summary
1	10:01	LIB	Peytton Pickett 15-yard rush (Alex Barbir kick) (4 plays, 24 yards, 1:41)	LIB 7–0
1	06:11	LIB	Malik Willis 6-yard rush (Alex Barbir kick) (7 plays, 41 yards, 2:58)	LIB 14–0
2	03:56	LIB	Treon Sibley 0-yard fumble returned (Alex Barbir kick) (4 plays, -5 yards, 1:51)	LIB 21–0
2	01:46	LIB	Alex Barbir 42-yard field goal (4 plays, -2 yards, 1:13)	LIB 24–0
3	11:07	LIB	Chancellor Smith 0-yard return of blocked punt (Alex Barbir kick) (3 plays, 7 yards, 1:12)	LIB 31–0
4	12:45	LIB	Alex Barbir 30-yard field goal (15 plays, 87 yards, 6:28)	LIB 34–0
4	10:27	LIB	Demario Douglas 73-yard punt returned (Alex Barbir PAT failed) (3 plays, 8 yards, 2:18)	LIB 40–0
4	03:34	ULM	Kadyn Roach 15-yard pass from Jeremy Hunt (Davis Hughes kick) (8 plays, 58 yards, 3:17)	LIB 40–7

Statistics	Louisiana–Monroe	Liberty
First downs	10	20
Total yards	198	400
Rushing yards	78	180
Passing yards	120	220
Turnovers	3	2
Time of possession	27:49	32:11

Team	Category	Player	Statistics
Louisiana–Monroe	Passing	Colby Suits	13/29, 78 yards, 2 INTs
Louisiana–Monroe	Rushing	Josh Johnson	13 carries, 51 yards
Louisiana–Monroe	Receiving	Josh Pederson	2 receptions, 21 yards
Liberty	Passing	Malik Willis	11/29, 177 yards, 1 INT
Liberty	Rushing	Malik Willis	13 carries, 87 yards, 1 TD
Liberty	Receiving	DJ Stubbs	2 receptions, 69 yards

=== At South Alabama ===
Louisiana–Monroe at South Alabama

Team	1	2	3	4	Total
Warhawks	0	6	0	8	14
• Jaguars	17	0	14	7	38

- Date: October 24, 2020
- Location: Hancock Whitney Stadium
  Mobile, AL
- Game start: 6:00 p.m. CDT
- Elapsed time: 2 hours and 58 minutes
- Game attendance: 5,186
- Game weather: 77 °F (25 °C) • Weather: Partly Cloudy• Wind: None
- Referee: Wayne Winkler
- TV announcers (ESPN+): JD Byars (play–by–play) and Pat Greenwood (analyst)

Scoring summary
1	10:07	USA	Devin Rockette 95-yard interception returned (Diego Guajardo kick) (7 plays, 53 yards, 3:44)	USA 7–0
1	03:01	USA	Diego Guajardo 50-yard field goal (10 plays, 50 yards, 4:15)	USA 10–0
1	00:51	USA	Kawaan Baker 80-yard pass from Desmond Trotter (Diego Guajardo kick) (2 plays, 82 yards, 0:42)	USA 17–0
2	03:54	ULM	Josh Johnson 1-yard rush (Davis Hughes PAT failed) (8 plays, 85 yards, 3:35)	USA 17–7
3	04:25	USA	Desmond Trotter 5-yard rush (Diego Guajardo kick) (10 plays, 80 yards, 5:10)	USA 24–6
3	00:13	USA	Kawaan Baker 16-yard pass from Desmond Trotter (Diego Guajardo kick) (5 plays, 49 yards, 2:43)	USA 31–6
4	12:26	ULM	Jordan Carroll 4-yard pass from Colby Suits (Colby Suits two-point conversion pass to Jevin Frett) (6 plays, 75 yards, 2:47)	USA 31–14
4	01:39	USA	Kawaan Baker 5-yard pass from Desmond Trotter (Diego Guajardo kick) (16 plays, 71 yards, 10:47)	USA 38–14

Statistics	Louisiana–Monroe	South Alabama
First downs	20	20
Total yards	380	415
Rushing yards	98	169
Passing yards	286	246
Turnovers	2	1
Time of possession	28:29	31:31

Team	Category	Player	Statistics
Louisiana–Monroe	Passing	Colby Suits	23/34, 286 yards, 1 TD, 1 INT
Louisiana–Monroe	Rushing	Josh Johnson	15 carries, 49 yards, 1 TD
Louisiana–Monroe	Receiving	Jahquan Bloomfield	3 receptions, 69 yards
South Alabama	Passing	Desmond Trotter	8/12, 184 yards, 3 TDs
South Alabama	Rushing	Carlos Davis	17 carries, 58 yards
South Alabama	Receiving	Kawaan Baker	6 receptions, 154 yards, 3 TDs

=== Appalachian State ===
Appalachian State at Louisiana–Monroe

Team	1	2	3	4	Total
• Mountaineers	14	7	7	3	31
Warhawks	0	7	0	6	13

- Date: October 31, 2020
- Location: Malone Stadium
  Monroe, LA
- Game start: 3:03 p.m. EDT
- Elapsed time: 3 hours and 3 minutes
- Game attendance: 5,493
- Game weather: 67 °F (19 °C) • Weather: Clear/Sunny • Wind: NW 6 MPH
- Referee: Jeremy Parker
- TV announcers (ESPNU): Bill Roth (play–by–play) and Dustin Fox (analyst)

Scoring summary
1	05:12	APP	Camerun Peoples 1-yard rush (Chandler Staton kick) (11 plays, 80 yards, 5:38)	APP 7–0
1	03:11	APP	Marcus Williams Jr. 48-yard rush (Chandler Staton kick) (2 plays, 54 yards, 0:40)	APP 14–0
2	09:30	ULM	Perry Carter 2-yard rush (Davis Hughes kick) (17 plays, 76 yards, 8:41)	APP 14–7
2	05:24	APP	Christian Wells 37-yard pass from Zac Thomas (Chandler Staton kick) (8 plays, 80 yards, 4:06)	APP 21–7
3	12:46	APP	Malik Williams 35-yard pass from Zac Thomas (Chandler Staton kick) (5 plays, 65 yards, 2:14)	APP 28–7
4	13:13	APP	Chandler Staton 38-yard field goal (10 plays, 29 yards, 4:31)	APP 31–7
4	00:00	ULM	Malik Jackson 15-yard pass from Colby Suits (10 plays, 74 yards, 2:38)	APP 31–13

Statistics	Appalachian State	Louisiana–Monroe
First downs	26	16
Total yards	480	222
Rushing yards	328	68
Passing yards	152	154
Turnovers	1	3
Time of possession	34:47	25:13

Team	Category	Player	Statistics
Appalachian State	Passing	Zac Thomas	13/18, 152 yards, 2 TDs, 1 INT
Appalachian State	Rushing	Zac Thomas	11 carries, 109 yards
Appalachian State	Receiving	Malik Williams	6 receptions, 60 yards, 1 TD
Louisiana–Monroe	Passing	Colby Suits	19/30, 134 yards, 1 TD, 1 INT
Louisiana–Monroe	Rushing	Isaiah Phillips	11 carries, 41 yards
Louisiana–Monroe	Receiving	Josh Pederson	2 receptions, 32 yards

=== At Georgia State ===
Louisiana–Monroe at Georgia State

Team	1	2	3	4	Total
Warhawks	7	7	6	14	34
• Panthers	21	21	3	7	52

- Date: November 7, 2020
- Location: Center Parc Stadium
  Atlanta, GA
- Game start: 11:02 a.m. CST
- Elapsed time: 3 hours and 20 minutes
- Game attendance: 2,921
- Game weather: 70 °F (21 °C) • Weather: Cloudy • Wind: E 12 MPH
- Referee: T. Livingston
- TV announcers (ESPN3): Chris Sylvester (play–by–play) and Sam Crenshaw (analyst)

Scoring summary
1	12:34	GSU	Roger Carter 4-yard pass from Cornelious Brown IV (Noel Ruiz kick) (6 plays, 75 yards, 2:26)	GSU 7–0
1	08:44	GSU	Cornelious Brown IV 3-yard rush (Noel Ruiz kick) (6 plays, 37 yards, 1:48)	GSU 14–0
1	05:16	GSU	Cornelious McCoy 18-yard pass from Cornelious Brown IV (Noel Ruiz kick) (7 plays, 28 yards, 2:51)	GSU 21–0
1	00:46	ULM	Perry Carter Jr. 2-yard rush (Davis Hughes kick) (11 plays, 75 yards, 4:30)	GSU 21–7
2	09:19	GSU	Cornelious McCoy 18-yard pass from Cornelious Brown IV (Noel Ruiz kick) (11 plays, 60 yards, 3:16)	GSU 28–7
2	08:08	GSU	Destin Coates 3-yard rush (Noel Ruiz kick) (2 plays, 35 yards, 0:26)	GSU 35–7
2	06:03	ULM	Perry Carter Jr. 50-yard pass from Jeremy Hunt (Davis Hughes kick) (4 plays, 75 yards, 2:05)	GSU 35–14
2	01:27	GSU	Destin Coates 1-yard rush (Noel Ruiz kick) (11 plays, 78 yards, 4:36)	GSU 42–14
3	08:41	ULM	Kaydn Roach 19-yard rush (Davis Hughes PAT failed) (9 plays, 67 yards, 3:46)	GSU 42–20
3	02:58	GSU	Noel Ruiz 22-yard field goal (13 plays, 72 yards, 5:43)	GSU 45–20
4	14:55	ULM	Charles Norman 4-yard pass from Jeremy Hunt (Davis Hughes kick) (7 plays, 75 yards, 3:03)	GSU 45–27
4	09:58	GSU	Marcus Carroll 5-yard rush (Noel Ruiz kick) (7 plays, 61 yards, 3:24)	GSU 52–27
4	06:44	ULM	Perry Carter Jr. 39-yard pass from Jeremy Hunt (Davis Hughes kick) (7 plays, 75 yards, 3:14)	GSU 52–34

Statistics	Louisiana–Monroe	Georgia State
First downs	23	23
Total yards	424	504
Rushing yards	85	263
Passing yards	339	241
Turnovers	3	1
Time of possession	28:16	31:44

Team	Category	Player	Statistics
Louisiana–Monroe	Passing	Jeremy Hunt	26/39, 339 yards, 3 TDs
Louisiana–Monroe	Rushing	Kadyn Roach	8 carries, 34 yards, 1 TD
Louisiana–Monroe	Receiving	Perry Carter Jr.	4 receptions, 124 yards, 2 TDs
Georgia State	Passing	Cornelious Brown IV	20/32, 241 yards, 3 TDs
Georgia State	Rushing	Destin Coates	20 carries, 102 yards, 2 TDs
Georgia State	Receiving	Cornelious McCoy	7 receptions, 118 yards, 2 TDs

=== Louisiana ===
Louisiana at Louisiana–Monroe

Team	1	2	3	4	Total
• Ragin' Cajuns	21	28	7	14	70
Warhawks	14	0	0	6	20

- Date: November 28, 2020
- Location: Malone Stadium
  Monroe, LA
- Game start: 2:05 p.m. CST
- Elapsed time: 3 hours and 13 minutes
- Game attendance: 3,132
- Game weather: 53 °F (12 °C) • Weather: Cloudy • Wind: NE 11 MPH
- Referee: Kyle Olson
- TV announcers (ESPN3): Chris Harris (play–by–play) and Mike Hammett (analyst)

Scoring summary
1	11:26	LA	Trey Ragas 11-yard rush (Kenneth Almendares kick) (3 plays, 38 yards, 1:32)	LA 7–0
1	06:36	LA	Levi Lewis 11-yard rush (Kenneth Almendares kick) (7 plays, 33 yards, 3:25)	LA 14–0
1	04:18	ULM	Cameron Darling 1-yard pass from Jeremy Hunt (Zach Elder kick) (2 plays, 1 yards, 0:39)	LA 14–7
1	01:53	LA	Elijah Mitchell 44-yard rush (Kenneth Almendares kick) (6 plays, 70 yards, 2:25)	LA 21–7
1	00:07	ULM	Jeremy Hunt 7-yard rush (Zach Elder kick) (4 plays, 78 yards, 1:46)	LA 21–14
2	11:50	LA	Neal Johnson 1-yard pass from Levi Lewis (Kenneth Almendares kick) (7 plays, 73 yards, 3:17)	LA 28–14
2	07:11	LA	Levi Lewis 7-yard rush (Kenneth Almendares kick) (9 plays, 60 yards, 3:38)	LA 35–14
2	05:02	LA	Bralen Trahan 53-yard interception returned (Kenneth Almendares kick) (6 plays, 8 yards, 2:09)	LA 42–14
2	00:17	LA	Kyren Lacy 22-yard pass from Levi Lewis (Kenneth Almendares kick) (11 plays, 86 yards, 2:34)	LA 49–14
3	10:38	LA	Johnny Lumpkin 1-yard pass from Levi Lewis (Kenneth Almendares kick); 6 plays, 43 yards, 2:45)	LA 56–14
4	14:54	ULM	Zach Rasmussen 0-yard fumble returned (Zach Elder PAT failed) (9 plays, 48 yards, 2:53)	LA 56–20
4	06:33	LA	Michael Orphey Jr. 48-yard rush (Kenneth Almendares kick) (7 plays, 77 yards, 4:29)	LA 63–20
4	03:23	LA	Kaleb Carter 13-yard pass from Jai'ave Magalei (Nate Snyder kick) (3 plays, 16 yards, 1:32)	LA 70–20

Statistics	Louisiana	Louisiana–Monroe
First downs	26	14
Total yards	511	247
Rushing yards	344	125
Passing yards	167	122
Turnovers	1	3
Time of possession	31:54	28:06

Team	Category	Player	Statistics
Louisiana	Passing	Levi Lewis	18/25, 147 yards, 3 TDs
Louisiana	Rushing	Trey Ragas	11 carries, 95 yards, 1 TD
Louisiana	Receiving	Kyren Lacy	5 receptions, 48 yards, 1 TD
Louisiana–Monroe	Passing	Jeremy Hunt	14/32, 121 yards, 1 TD, 1 INT
Louisiana–Monroe	Rushing	Kadyn Roach	7 carries, 65 yards
Louisiana–Monroe	Receiving	Jonathan Hodoh	1 reception, 43 yards
