= List of Appalachian State Mountaineers bowl games =

The Appalachian State Mountaineers football team competes as part of the National Collegiate Athletic Association (NCAA) Division I Football Bowl Subdivision (FBS), representing Appalachian State University in the Eastern Division of the Sun Belt Conference. Since the establishment of the team in 1928 and their first FBS season in 2014, the program has competed in seven NCAA-sanctioned bowl games.

== Bowl games ==
List of bowl games showing bowl played in, score, date, season, opponent, stadium, location, attendance and head coach (Note: Statistics correct as of 2025–26 NCAA football bowl games.)
#	Bowl	Score (Note: Results are sortable first by whether the result was an Appalachian win or loss and then second by the margin of victory.)	Date	Season (Note: Links to the season article for the Appalachian team that competed in the bowl for that year.)	Opponent (Note: Links to the season article for the opponent that Appalachian competed against in the bowl for that year when available or to their general page when unavailable.)	Stadium	Location	Attendance	Head coach
1	Camellia Bowl	W 31–29	December 19, 2015	2015	Ohio Bobcats	Cramton Bowl	Montgomery, AL	19,621	Scott Satterfield
2	Camellia Bowl	W 31–28	December 17, 2016	2016	Toledo Rockets	Cramton Bowl	Montgomery, AL	20,257	Scott Satterfield
3	Dollar General Bowl	W 34–0	December 23, 2017	2017	Toledo Rockets	Ladd–Peebles Stadium	Mobile, AL	28,706	Scott Satterfield
4	New Orleans Bowl	W 45–13	December 15, 2018	2018	Middle Tennessee Blue Raiders	Mercedes-Benz Superdome	New Orleans, LA	23,942	Mark Ivey
5	New Orleans Bowl	W 31–17	December 21, 2019	2019	UAB Blazers	Mercedes-Benz Superdome	New Orleans, LA	21,202	Shawn Clark
6	Myrtle Beach Bowl	W 56–28	December 21, 2020	2020	North Texas Mean Green	Brooks Stadium	Conway, SC	5,000	Shawn Clark
7	Boca Raton Bowl	L 38–59	December 18, 2021	2021	Western Kentucky Hilltoppers	FAU Stadium	Boca Raton, FL	15,429	Shawn Clark
8	Cure Bowl	W 13–9	December 16, 2023	2023	Miami RedHawks	FBC Mortgage Stadium	Orlando, FL	11,121	Shawn Clark
9	Birmingham Bowl	L 10–29	December 29, 2025	2025	Georgia Southern	Protective Stadium	Birmingham, AL	12,092	Dowell Loggains
