= Shawn Clark =

American football player and coach (1975–2025)

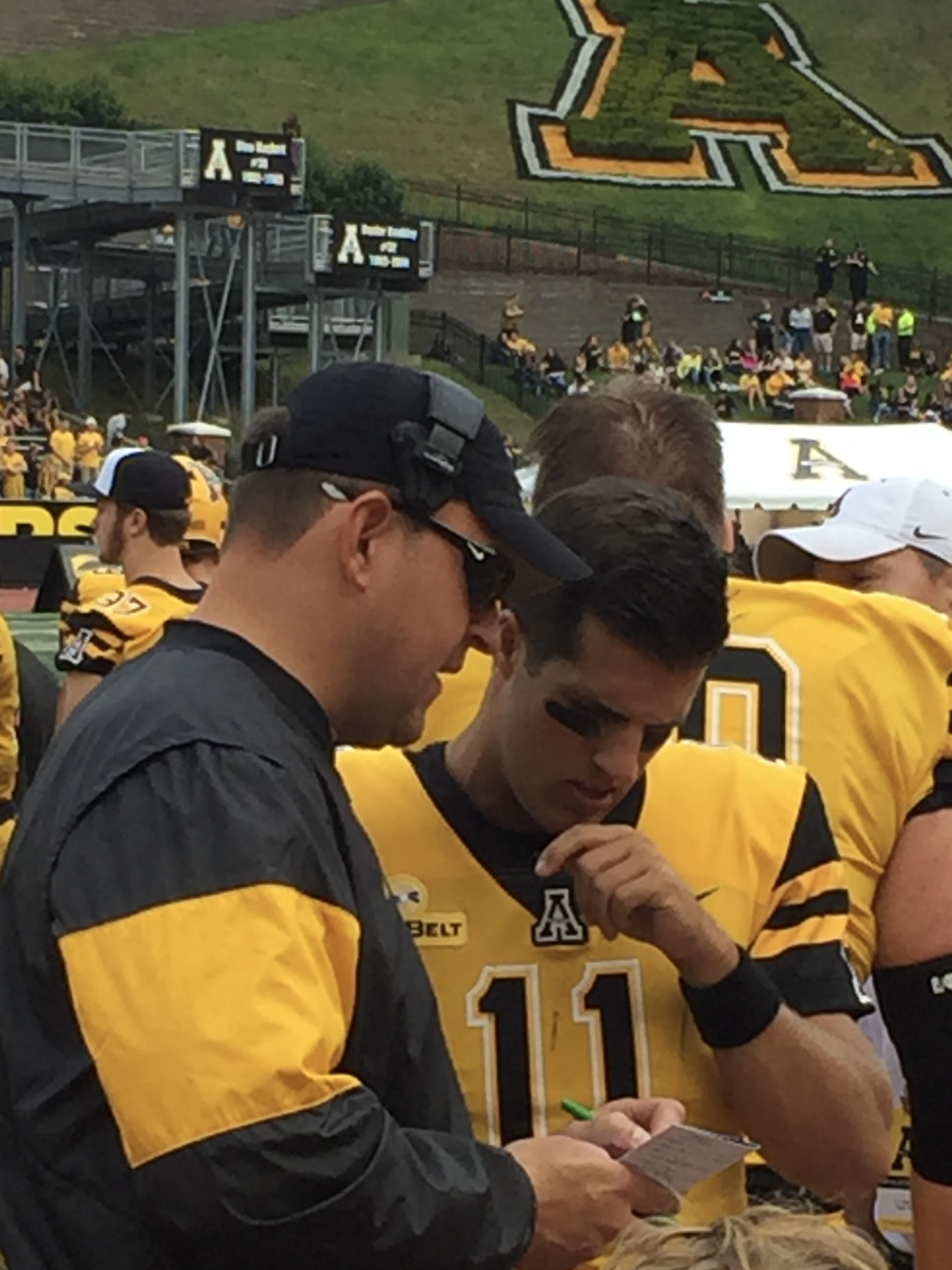
- Shawn Clark with Taylor Lamb (#11) in 2017

Biographical details
- Born: August 16, 1975; Charleston, West Virginia, U.S.
- Died: September 21, 2025 (aged 50); Orlando, Florida, U.S.
- Education: Appalachian State University

Playing career
- 1994–1998: Appalachian State
- Position: Offensive lineman

Coaching career (HC unless noted)
- 2001–2002: Louisville (GA)
- 2003–2008: Eastern Kentucky (OL)
- 2009–2012: Purdue (OL)
- 2013–2015: Kent State (OL)
- 2016–2018: Appalachian State (co-OC/OL)
- 2019: Appalachian State (AHC/OL)
- 2020–2024: Appalachian State
- 2025: UCF (OL)

Head coaching record
- Overall: 40–24
- Bowls: 3–1

Accomplishments and honors

Championships
- Sun Belt East Division (2021)

Shawn Clark (August 16, 1975 – September 21, 2025) was an American college football coach who served as the head football coach at Appalachian State University from 2019 to 2024. In 2025, he was the offensive line coach at the University of Central Florida.

== Playing career ==
An offensive lineman in college, Clark was a two-time All-American (1996 and 1998) and three-time all-conference selection (1995, 1996, 1998) for teams that went a combined 45–16 during his first five years in Boone. In fact, as a player during the 12–0 start in 1995 and a coach for the 2019 team that has set a single-season record for wins by an FBS program in the state of North Carolina, Clark has been part of the two App State teams to post 11 regular-season victories.

Clark graduated from App State with a bachelor's degree in criminal justice in 1998 and earned a master's degree in education from Louisville in 2003.

== Coaching career ==
Clark developed over a dozen NFL offensive linemen in his career (including six O-line draft picks): Cooper Hodges, Larry Turner, Derek Hardman, Dennis Kelly, Nick Mondek, Jordan Roos, Rick Schmeig, Kevin Pamphile, Colby Gossett, Josh Kline, Armani Taylor-Prioleau, Ryan Neuzil, and Beau Nunn.

=== Appalachian State ===
Clark joined the Appalachian staff as offensive line coach in 2016 under head coach Scott Satterfield, then becoming an assistant head coach in 2019.

In 2017, they led the Sun Belt in both rushing yards and fewest sacks, allowing only eight sacks (ranked second nationally) and averaging 223.6 rushing yards per game, ranking 22nd nationally. Appalachian State became the first Sun Belt Conference program to have three offensive linemen named to the all-conference first team (Colby Gossett, Beau Nunn, Victor Johnson). The 2018 team was 14th nationally in rushing yards per game (240.3) and 20th nationally with only 18 sacks allowed. Quarterback Justice Hansen was awarded the Sun Belt Offensive Player of the Year. The following season Quarterback Zac Thomas was named Sun Belt Offensive Player of the Year.

Upon the departure of Eliah Drinkwitz for Missouri, Clark became the 22nd head coach in program history on December 13, 2019. Clark led the Mountaineers in their bowl game that year to a 31–17 victory over UAB Blazers in the New Orleans Bowl. Running back Darrynton Evans was also named Sun Belt Offensive Player of the Year, with Appalachian State receiving the title for the third straight year.

Clark's first full season as head coach of the Mountaineers was met with complications from the COVID-19 pandemic, which caused many changes to schedules and football operations around the country. The team persevered and Clark finished 9–3 and led the team in the inaugural Myrtle Beach Bowl and defeated the North Texas Mean Green with a dominating 56–28 performance.

In the 2021 season, Linebacker D'Marco Jackson was named Sun Belt Defensive Player of the Year and Quarterback Chase Brice was named Sun Belt Newcomer of the Year.

In 2023, Quarterback Joey Aguilar would also receive the Sun Belt Newcomer of the Year Award.

On December 2, 2024, Clark was fired following a 5–6 season in 2024.

=== UCF ===
After his exit from Appalachian State, Clark was hired by Scott Frost to be the offensive line coach at the University of Central Florida. The move was first reported by Pete Thamel and later confirmed by the Orlando Sentinel. Clark was one of Frost's first hires after he was selected to replace Gus Malzahn at UCF.

== Personal life ==
Clark was married to his wife Jonelle, and they had two children Giana and Braxton.

== Death ==
On September 9, 2025, Clark was hospitalized after an undisclosed medical emergency. He died on September 21, 2025, at the age of 50.

== Head coaching record ==
Year	Team	Overall	Conference	Standing	Bowl/playoffs	Coaches^{#}	AP^{°}
Appalachian State Mountaineers (Sun Belt Conference) (2019–2024)
2019	Appalachian State	1–0	0–0		W New Orleans	18	19
2020	Appalachian State	9–3	6–2	2nd (East)	W Myrtle Beach		
2021	Appalachian State	10–4	7–1	1st (East)	L Boca Raton		
2022	Appalachian State	6–6	3–5	T–4th (East)			
2023	Appalachian State	9–5	6–2	2nd (East) (Note: Appalachian State represented the East Division in the Sun Belt Championship Game. James Madison finished first place in the East Division, but was ineligible to participate in the Championship Game due to FBS transition rules.)	W Cure		
2024	Appalachian State	5–6	3–5	T–5th (East)			
Appalachian State:		40–24	25–15				
Total:		40–24					
National championship Conference title Conference division title or championship game berth
