= 2020 Appalachian State Mountaineers football team =

American college football season

2020 Appalachian State Mountaineers football

Myrtle Beach Bowl champion

Myrtle Beach Bowl, W 56–28 vs. North Texas
- Conference: Sun Belt Conference
- East Division
- Record: 9–3 (6–2 Sun Belt)
- Head coach: Shawn Clark (1st season)
- Offensive coordinator: Tony Petersen (1st season)
- Offensive scheme: Multiple
- Defensive coordinator: Dale Jones (4th season)
- Base defense: 3–4
- Home stadium: Kidd Brewer Stadium

2020 Sun Belt Conference football standings
	Conf.			Overall
Team	W		L	W		L
East Division
No. 14 Coastal Carolina xy+	8	–	0	11	–	1
Appalachian State	6	–	2	9	–	3
Georgia Southern	4	–	4	8	–	5
Georgia State	4	–	4	6	–	4
Troy	3	–	4	5	–	6
West Division
No. 15 Louisiana xy+	7	–	1	10	–	1
South Alabama	3	–	5	4	–	7
Arkansas State	2	–	6	4	–	7
Texas State	2	–	6	2	–	10
Louisiana–Monroe	0	–	7	0	–	10
Championship: Louisiana at Coastal Carolina (Canceled)
+ – Conference co-champions; x – Division champion/co-champions; y – Championship game participant; Rankings from AP Poll

The 2020 Appalachian State Mountaineers football team represented Appalachian State University during the 2020 NCAA Division I FBS football season. The Mountaineers were led by first-year head coach Shawn Clark. Appalachian State played their home games at Kidd Brewer Stadium on the school's Boone, North Carolina, campus, and competed as a member of the East Division of the Sun Belt Conference.

== Schedule ==
Appalachian State had games scheduled against Morgan State, UMass, Wake Forest and Wisconsin, which were canceled due to the COVID-19 pandemic.

Date	Time	Opponent	Rank	Site	TV	Result	Attendance
September 12	12:00 p.m.	Charlotte*		Kidd Brewer Stadium; Boone, NC	ESPN2	W 35–20	0
September 19	3:30 p.m.	at Marshall*	No. 23	Joan C. Edwards Stadium; Huntington, WV	CBS	L 7–17	12,050
September 26	12:00 p.m.	Campbell*		Kidd Brewer Stadium; Boone, NC	ESPN+	W 52–21	350
October 22	7:30 p.m.	Arkansas State^{†}		Kidd Brewer Stadium; Boone, NC	ESPN	W 45–17	2,100
October 31	4:00 p.m.	at Louisiana–Monroe		Malone Stadium; Monroe, LA	ESPNU	W 31–13	5,493
November 7	4:00 p.m.	at Texas State		Bobcat Stadium; San Marcos, TX	ESPN+	W 38–17	6,745
November 14	2:30 p.m.	Georgia State		Kidd Brewer Stadium; Boone, NC	ESPN+	W 17–13	2,100
November 21	12:00 p.m.	at No. 15 Coastal Carolina		Brooks Stadium; Conway, SC	ESPN	L 23–34	5,000
November 28	8:00 p.m.	Troy		Kidd Brewer Stadium; Boone, NC	ESPN2	W 47–10	2,100
December 4	8:30 p.m.	No. 25 Louisiana		Kidd Brewer Stadium; Boone, NC	ESPN	L 21–24	2,170
December 12	6:00 p.m.	at Georgia Southern		Paulson Stadium; Statesboro, GA (rivalry)	ESPN3	W 34–26	6,228
December 21	2:30 p.m.	vs. North Texas*		Brooks Stadium; Conway, SC (Myrtle Beach Bowl)	ESPN	W 56–28	5,000
*Non-conference game; ^{†}Homecoming; Rankings from AP Poll and CFP Rankings after November 24 released prior to game; All times are in Eastern time

Schedule source:

== Game summaries ==
=== Charlotte ===
Charlotte at Appalachian State

Team	1	2	3	4	Total
49ers	7	3	10	0	20
• Mountaineers	0	14	7	14	35

- Date: September 12, 2020
- Location: Kidd Brewer Stadium
  Boone, NC
- Game start: 12:00 p.m. EDT
- Elapsed time: 3 hours and 32 minutes
- Game attendance: 0
- Game weather: 66 °F (19 °C) • Weather: Cloudy and Rainy • Wind: Light
- Referee: Chris Bynum
- TV announcers (ESPN2): Bob Wischusen, Dan Orlovsky and Lericia Harris (sideline)

Scoring summary
1	4:30	CHAR	Tre Harbison III 14-yard rush (Jonathan Cruz kick) (12 plays, 91 yards, 6:04)	CHAR 7–0
2	12:18	APP	Camerun Peoples 16-yard rush (Chandler Staton kick) (8 plays, 67 yards, 3:01)	TIE 7–7
2	04:50	APP	Marcus Williams 1-yard rush (Chandler Staton kick) (10 plays, 79 yards, 5:13)	APP 14–7
2	01:52	CHAR	Jonathan Cruz 23-yard field goal (7 plays, 70 yards, 2:51)	APP 14–10
3	03:15	CHAR	Jonathan Cruz 49-yard field goal (12 plays, 55 yards, 3:33)	APP 14–13
3	01:51	APP	Thomas Hennigan 51-yard pass from Zac Thomas (Chandler Staton kick) (5 plays, 75 yards, 1:24)	APP 21–13
3	01:35	CHAR	Aaron McAllister 97-yard kickoff returned (Jonathan Cruz kick) (0 plays, 0 yards, 0:00)	APP 21–20
4	10:08	APP	Daetrich Harrington 4-yard rush (Chandler Staton kick) (14 plays, 75 yards, 6:27)	APP 28–20
4	01:15	APP	Daetrich Harrington 15-yard rush (Chandler Staton kick) (6 plays, 80 yards, 3:48)	APP 35–20

Statistics	Charlotte	Appalachian State
First downs	16	29
Total yards	286	512
Rushing yards	146	308
Passing yards	140	204
Turnovers	2	3
Time of possession	28:37	31:23

Team	Category	Player	Statistics
Charlotte	Passing	Chris Reynolds	11/30, 140 yards, 140 yards, 2 INTs
Charlotte	Rushing	Tre Harbison	17 carries, 87 yards, 1 TD
Charlotte	Receiving	Taylor Thompson	2 receptions, 62 yards
Appalachian State	Passing	Zac Thomas	14/21, 204 yards, 1 TD, 1 INT
Appalachian State	Rushing	Marcus Williams Jr.	14 carries, 117 yards, 1 TD
Appalachian State	Receiving	Thomas Hennigan	5 receptions, 120 yards, 1 TD

=== At Marshall ===
Appalachian State at Marshall

Team	1	2	3	4	Total
No. 23 Mountaineers	7	0	0	0	7
• Thundering Herd	7	3	7	0	17

- Date: September 19, 2020
- Location: Joan C. Edwards Stadium
  Huntington, WV
- Game start: 3:45 p.m. EDT
- Elapsed time: 3 hours and 21 minutes
- Game attendance: 12,050
- Game weather: 69 °F (21 °C) • Weather: Clear and Sunny • Wind: 8 SSW MPH
- Referee: M. VanderVelde
- TV announcers (CBS): Rich Waltz (play–by–play), Aaron Murray (analyst), Sherree Burruss (sideline reporter)

Scoring summary
1	12:29	MARSH	Brenden Knox 2-yard rush (Shane Ciucci kick) (7 plays, 51 yards, 2:31)	MARSH 7–0
1	07:11	APP	Jalen Virgil 11-yard pass from Zac Thomas (Chandler Staton kick) (11 plays, 85 yards, 5:18)	TIE 7–7
2	02:28	MARSH	Shane Ciucci 29-yard field goal (14 plays, 68 yards, 6:08)	MARSH 10–7
3	04:44	MARSH	Grant Wells 12-yard rush (Shane Ciucci kick) (2 plays, 79 yards, 0:34)	MARSH 17–7

Statistics	Appalachian State	Marshall
First downs	26	23
Total yards	364	379
Rushing yards	96	216
Passing yards	268	163
Turnovers	2	1
Time of possession	28:01	31:59

Team	Category	Player	Statistics
Appalachian State	Passing	Zac Thomas	22/38, 268 yards, 1 TD, 1 INT
Appalachian State	Rushing	Camerun Peoples	12 carries, 57 yards
Appalachian State	Receiving	Thomas Hennigan	5 receptions, 88 yards
Marshall	Passing	Grant Wells	11/25, 163 yards, 1 INT
Marshall	Rushing	Brandon Knox	28 carries, 138 yards, 1 TD
Marshall	Receiving	Xavier Gaines	2 receptions, 68 yards

=== Campbell ===
Campbell at Appalachian State

Team	1	2	3	4	Total
Camels	7	6	0	8	21
• RV Mountaineers	7	10	21	14	52

- Date: September 26, 2020
- Location: Kidd Brewer Stadium
  Boone, NC
- Game start: 12:00 p.m. EDT
- Elapsed time: 3 hours and 21 minutes
- Game attendance: 350
- Game weather: 67 °F (19 °C) • Weather: Partly Cloudy • Wind: 0 MPH
- Referee: Kyle Olson
- TV announcers (ESPN+): Harrison Battle (play–by–play) and Stan Lewter (analyst)

Scoring summary
1	04:40	CAMP	Hajj-Malik Williams 1-yard rush (Isaac Riffle kick) (14 plays, 83 yards, 7:39)	CAMP 7–0
1	00:11	APP	Daetrich Harrington 17-yard rush (Chandler Staton kick) (10 plays, 82 yards, 4:22)	TIE 7–7
2	11:30	CAMP	Hajj-Malik Williams 10-yard rush (Isaac Riffle PAT failed) (10 plays, 75 yards, 3:41)	CAMP 13–7
2	03:22	APP	Chandler Staton 32-yard field goal (16 plays, 54 yards, 8:01)	CAMP 13–10
2	00:24	APP	Daetrich Harrington 2-yard rush (Chandler Staton kick) (11 plays, 51 yards, 1:35)	APP 17–13
3	10:56	APP	Daetrich Harrington 40-yard rush (Chandler Staton kick) (9 plays, 70 yards, 4:01)	APP 24–13
3	08:21	APP	Zac Thomas 6-yard rush (Chandler Staton kick) (4 plays, 46 yards, 1:21)	APP 31–13
3	05:02	APP	Nate Noel 5-yard rush (Chandler Staton kick) (5 plays, 56 yards, 1:50)	APP 38–13
4	09:10	APP	Daetrich Harrington 5-yard rush (Chandler Staton kick) (8 plays, 96 yards, 3:58)	APP 45–13
4	03:19	APP	Jacob Huesman 8-yard rush (Chandler Staton kick) (9 plays, 45 yards, 4:17)	APP 52–13
4	02:59	CAMP	Austin Hite 87-yard pass from Wiley Hartley (Wiley Hartley two-point conversion rush) (1 play, 87 yards, 0:13)	APP 52–21

Statistics	Campbell	Appalachian State
First downs	15	31
Total yards	305	535
Rushing yards	117	404
Passing yards	188	131
Turnovers	0	0
Time of possession	25:40	34:20

Team	Category	Player	Statistics
Campbell	Passing	Hajj-Malik Williams	7/19, 101 yards
Campbell	Rushing	Hajj-Malik Williams	14 carries, 44 yards, 2 TDs
Campbell	Receiving	Austin Hite	2 receptions, 93 yards, 1 TD
Appalachian State	Passing	Zac Thomas	12/18, 131 yards
Appalachian State	Rushing	Daetrich Harrington	32 carries, 211 yards, 4 TDs
Appalachian State	Receiving	Thomas Hennigan	3 receptions, 67 yards

=== Arkansas State ===
Arkansas State at Appalachian State

Team	1	2	3	4	Total
Red Wolves	7	0	10	0	17
• Mountaineers	14	17	7	7	45

- Date: October 22, 2020
- Location: Kidd Brewer Stadium
  Boone, NC
- Game start: 7:30 p.m. EDT
- Elapsed time: 3 hours and 26 minutes
- Game attendance: 2,100
- Game weather: 64 °F (18 °C) • Weather: Clear • Wind: Light
- Referee: Jeremy Parker
- TV announcers (ESPN): Matt Barrie (play–by–play), Mike Golic Jr. (analyst), and Marty Smith (sideline reporter)

Scoring summary
1	09:31	APP	Christian Wells 46-yard pass from Zac Thomas (Chandler Staton kick) (6 plays, 85 yards, 3:06)	APP 7–0
1	06:26	ARST	Jamal Jones 8-yard rush (Blake Grupe kick) (8 plays, 77 yards, 3:05)	TIE 7–7
1	05:05	APP	Daetrich Harrington 55-yard rush (Chandler Staton kick) (3 plays, 75 yards, 1:21)	APP 14–7
2	10:58	APP	Mike Evans 5-yard pass from Zac Thomas (Chandler Staton kick) (17 plays, 88 yards, 6:27)	APP 21–7
2	04:39	APP	Chandler Staton 39-yard field goal (4 plays, −1 yards, 0:44)	APP 24–7
2	01:04	APP	Malik Williams 16-yard pass from Zac Thomas (Chandler Staton kick) (7 plays, 63 yards, 1:59)	APP 31–7
3	09:36	ARST	Blake Grupe 34-yard field goal (13 plays, 57 yards, 4:34)	APP 31–10
3	02:08	ARST	Lincoln Pare 48-yard rush (Blake Grupe kick) (3 plays, 65 yards, 0:39)	APP 31–17
3	00:15	APP	Zac Thomas 60-yard rush (Chandler Staton kick) (4 plays, 75 yards, 1:53)	APP 38–17
4	08:22	APP	Christian Wells 20-yard pass from Zac Thomas (Chandler Staton kick) (7 plays, 56 yards, 3:33)	APP 45–17

Statistics	Arkansas State	Appalachian State
First downs	24	22
Total yards	368	521
Rushing yards	73	305
Passing yards	295	216
Turnovers	2	2
Time of possession	30:43	29:17

Team	Category	Player	Statistics
Arkansas State	Passing	Layne Hatcher	9/16, 178 yards, 1 INT
Arkansas State	Rushing	Lincoln Pare	5 carries, 46 yards, 1 TD
Arkansas State	Receiving	Jonathan Adams Jr.	6 receptions, 134 yards
Appalachian State	Passing	Zac Thomas	16/23, 216 yards, 4 TDs, 1 INT
Appalachian State	Rushing	Daetrich Harrington	18 carries, 137 yards, 1 TD
Appalachian State	Receiving	Christian Wells	3 receptions, 80 yards, 2 TDs

=== At Louisiana–Monroe ===
Appalachian State at Louisiana–Monroe

Team	1	2	3	4	Total
• Mountaineers	14	7	7	3	31
Warhawks	0	7	0	6	13

- Date: October 31, 2020
- Location: Malone Stadium
  Monroe, LA
- Game start: 3:03 p.m. EDT
- Elapsed time: 3 hours and 3 minutes
- Game attendance: 5,493
- Game weather: 67 °F (19 °C) • Weather: Clear/Sunny • Wind: NW 6 MPH
- Referee: Jeremy Parker
- TV announcers (ESPNU): Bill Roth (play–by–play) and Dustin Fox (analyst)

Scoring summary
1	05:12	APP	Camerun Peoples 1-yard rush (Chandler Staton kick) (11 plays, 80 yards, 5:38)	APP 7–0
1	03:11	APP	Marcus Williams Jr. 48-yard rush (Chandler Staton kick) (2 plays, 54 yards, 0:40)	APP 14–0
2	09:30	ULM	Perry Carter 2-yard rush (Davis Hughes kick) (17 plays, 76 yards, 8:41)	APP 14–7
2	05:24	APP	Christian Wells 37-yard pass from Zac Thomas (Chandler Staton kick) (8 plays, 80 yards, 4:06)	APP 21–7
3	12:46	APP	Malik Williams 35-yard pass from Zac Thomas (Chandler Staton kick) (5 plays, 65 yards, 2:14)	APP 28–7
4	13:13	APP	Chandler Staton 38-yard field goal (10 plays, 29 yards, 4:31)	APP 31–7
4	00:00	ULM	Malik Jackson 15-yard pass from Colby Suits (10 plays, 74 yards, 2:38)	APP 31–13

Statistics	Appalachian State	Louisiana–Monroe
First downs	26	16
Total yards	480	222
Rushing yards	328	68
Passing yards	152	154
Turnovers	1	3
Time of possession	34:47	25:13

Team	Category	Player	Statistics
Appalachian State	Passing	Zac Thomas	13/18, 152 yards, 2 TDs, 1 INT
Appalachian State	Rushing	Zac Thomas	11 carries, 109 yards
Appalachian State	Receiving	Malik Williams	6 receptions, 60 yards, 1 TD
Louisiana–Monroe	Passing	Colby Suits	19/30, 134 yards, 1 TD, 1 INT
Louisiana–Monroe	Rushing	Isaiah Phillips	11 carries, 41 yards
Louisiana–Monroe	Receiving	Josh Pederson	2 receptions, 32 yards

=== At Texas State ===
Appalachian State at Texas State

Team	1	2	3	4	Total
• RV Mountaineers	14	10	0	14	38
Bobcats	7	3	0	7	17

- Date: November 7, 2020
- Location: Bobcat Stadium
  San Marcos, TX
- Game start: 3:05 p.m. EST
- Elapsed time: 3 hours and 6 minutes
- Game attendance: 6,745
- Game weather: 81 °F (27 °C) • Weather: Partly Cloudy • Wind: SE 7 MPH
- Referee: Wayne Winkler
- TV announcers (ESPN+): Brant Freeman (play–by–play) and Steven Foster (analyst)

Scoring summary
1	14:16	TXST	Javen Banks 75-yard pass from Tyler Vitt (Seth Keller kick) (3 plays, 75 yards, 0:44)	TXST 7–0
1	11:08	APP	Miller Gibbs 32-yard pass from Zac Thomas (Chandler Staton kick) (7 plays, 72 yards, 3:03)	TIE 7–7
1	01:04	APP	Brendan Harrington 49-yard interception returned (Chandler Staton kick) (3 plays, 12 yards, 0:56)	APP 14–7
2	12:20	TXST	Seth Keller 42-yard field goal (7 plays, 51 yards, 3:44)	APP 14–10
2	07:09	APP	Caleb Spurlin 1-yard pass from Zac Thomas (Chandler Staton kick) (11 plays, 75 yards, 5:11)	APP 21–10
2	00:15	APP	Chandler Staton 33-yard field goal (11 plays, 50 yards, 2:09)	APP 24–10
4	14:16	APP	Jalen Virgil 9-yard pass from Zac Thomas (Chandler Staton kick) (16 plays, 91 yards, 7:26)	APP 31–10
4	11:20	TXST	Marcell Barbee 14-yard pass from Tyler Vitt (Seth Keller kick) (8 plays, 75 yards, 2:56)	APP 31–17
4	05:59	APP	Camerun Peoples 32-yard rush (Chandler Staton kick) (3 plays, 47 yards, 1:32)	APP 38–17

Statistics	Appalachian State	Texas State
First downs	22	21
Total yards	426	420
Rushing yards	258	215
Passing yards	168	205
Turnovers	0	2
Time of possession	32:15	27:45

Team	Category	Player	Statistics
Appalachian State	Passing	Zac Thomas	18/27, 168 yards, 3 TDs
Appalachian State	Rushing	Daetrich Harrington	18 carries, 113 yards
Appalachian State	Receiving	Miller Gibbs	3 receptions, 47 yards, 1 TD
Texas State	Passing	Tyler Vitt	21/38, 205 yards, 2 TDs, 2 INTs
Texas State	Rushing	Jahmyl Jeter	11 carries, 135 yards
Texas State	Receiving	Javen Banks	4 receptions, 89 yards, 1 TD

=== Georgia State ===
Georgia State at Appalachian State

Team	1	2	3	4	Total
Panthers	7	3	0	3	13
• RV Mountaineers	3	0	7	7	17

- Date: November 14, 2020
- Location: Kidd Brewer Stadium
  Boone, NC
- Game start: 2:30 p.m. EST
- Elapsed time: 3 hours and 8 minutes
- Game attendance: 2,100
- Game weather: 54 °F (12 °C) • Weather: Sunny and Clear • Wind: Light
- Referee: Marshall Lewis
- TV announcers (ESPN3): Harrison Battle (play–by–play) and Stan Lewter (analyst)

Scoring summary
1	10:17	GSU	Sam Pinckney 19-yard pass from Cornelious Brown IV (Noel Ruiz kick) (13 plays, 75 yards, 4:43)	GSU 7–0
1	02:53	APP	Chandler Staton 21-yard field goal (12 plays, 46 yards, 5:06)	GSU 7–3
2	00:11	GSU	Noel Ruiz 23-yard field goal (9 plays, 64 yards, 1:28)	GSU 10–3
3	00:46	APP	Henry Pearson 9-yard pass from Zac Thomas (Chandler Staton kick) (6 plays, 80 yards, 2:34)	TIE 10–10
4	12:29	GSU	Noel Ruiz 32-yard field goal (9 plays, 60 yards, 3:17)	GSU 13–10
4	04:55	APP	Camerun Peoples 10-yard rush (Chandler Staton kick) (11 plays, 77 yards, 4:33)	APP 17–13

Statistics	Georgia State	Appalachian State
First downs	16	19
Total yards	300	310
Rushing yards	148	131
Passing yards	152	179
Turnovers	1	1
Time of possession	25:25	34:35

Team	Category	Player	Statistics
Georgia State	Passing	Cornelious Brown IV	11/33, 152 yards, 1 TD
Georgia State	Rushing	Tucker Gregg	10 carries, 85 yards
Georgia State	Receiving	Sam Pinckney	4 receptions, 74 yards, 1 TD
Appalachian State	Passing	Zac Thomas	16/22, 146 yards, 1 TD, 1 INT
Appalachian State	Rushing	Camerun Peoples	17 carries, 67 yards, 1 TD
Appalachian State	Receiving	Malik Williams	3 receptions, 60 yards

=== At Coastal Carolina ===
Appalachian State at Coastal Carolina

Team	1	2	3	4	Total
Mountaineers	7	10	3	3	23
• No. 15 Chanticleers	6	3	12	13	34

- Date: November 21, 2020
- Location: Brooks Stadium
  Conway, SC
- Game start: 12:01 p.m. EST
- Elapsed time: 3:35
- Game attendance: 5,000
- Game weather: 72 °F (22 °C) • Weather: Sunny • Wind: ESE, 2 MPH
- Referee: T. Livingston
- TV announcers (ESPN2): Clay Matvick (play–by–play), Dustin Fox (analyst), Marty Smith (sideline reporter)

Scoring summary
1	11:40	APP	Camerun Peoples 1-yard run (Chandler Staton kick) (8 plays, 70 yards, 3:20)	APP 7–0
1	11:29	CCU	Isaiah Likely 75-yard pass from Grayson McCall (Massimo Biscardi PAT failed) (1 play, 75 yards, 0:11)	APP 7–6
2	10:50	CCU	Massimo Biscardi 51-yard field goal (9 plays, 27 yards, 5:10)	CCU 9–7
2	4:57	APP	Chandler Staton 44-yard field goal (12 plays, 48 yards, 5:53)	APP 10–9
2	0:09	APP	Christian Wells 25-yard pass from Zac Thomas (Chandler Staton kick) (9 plays, 84 yards, 0:51)	APP 17–9
3	14:11	CCU	Grayson McCall 62-yard run (Two-point pass conversion failed) (3 plays, 65 yards, 0:49)	APP 17–15
3	10:55	APP	Chandler Staton 36-yard field goal (7 plays, 69 yards, 3:12)	APP 20–15
3	6:21	CCU	C. J. Marable 19-yard pass from Grayson McCall (Two-point pass conversion failed) (10 plays, 65 yards, 4:34)	CCU 21–20
4	11:47	APP	Chandler Staton 45-yard field goal (10 plays, 53 yards, 5:07)	APP 23–21
4	2:24	CCU	Reese White 3-yard run (Two-point pass conversion failed) (10 plays, 49 yards, 4:35)	CCU 27–23
4	1:20	CCU	D'Jordan Strong 38-yard interception return (Massimo Biscardi kick) (4 plays, −10 yards, 1:04)	CCU 34–23

Statistics	Appalachian State	Coastal Carolina
First downs	22	16
Total yards	415	369
Rushing yards	204	189
Passing yards	211	200
Turnovers	3	1
Time of possession	33:50	26:10

Team	Category	Player	Statistics
Appalachian State	Passing	Zac Thomas	17/29, 211 yards, 1 TD, 3 INTs
Appalachian State	Rushing	Camerun Peoples	27 carries, 178 yards, 1 TD
Appalachian State	Receiving	Malik Williams	3 receptions, 79 yards
Coastal Carolina	Passing	Grayson McCall	12/21, 200 yards, 2 TDs
Coastal Carolina	Rushing	Grayson McCall	14 carries, 69 yards, 1 TD
Coastal Carolina	Receiving	Isaiah Likely	3 receptions, 118 yards, 1 TD

=== Troy ===
Troy at Appalachian State

Team	1	2	3	4	Total
Trojans	0	10	0	0	10
• Mountaineers	21	13	13	0	47

- Date: November 28, 2020
- Location: Kidd Brewer Stadium
  Boone, NC
- Game start: 3:30 p.m. EST
- Elapsed time: 3 hours and 6 minutes
- Game attendance: 2,100
- Game weather: 54 °F (12 °C) • Weather: Sunny and Clear • Wind: Light
- Referee: Jeremy Parker
- TV announcers (ESPN2): Bill Roth (play–by–play) and Dustin Fox (analyst)

Scoring summary
1	12:16	APP	Camerun Peoples 63-yard rush (Chandler Staton kick) (3 plays, 72 yards, 0:50)	APP 7–0
1	07:58	APP	Malik Williams 15-yard pass from Zac Thomas (Chandler Staton kick) (6 plays, 71 yards, 2:21)	APP 14–0
1	07:09	APP	Steven Jones Jr. 34-yard interception returned (Chandler Staton kick) (3 plays, 6 yards, 0:49)	APP 21–0
2	14:56	APP	Thomas Hennigan 22-yard pass from Zac Thomas (Chandler Staton kick) (12 plays, 97 yards, 5:05)	APP 28–0
2	08:36	TROY	Evan Legassey 27-yard field goal (13 plays, 66 yards, 6:20)	APP 28–3
2	05:32	APP	Chandler Staton 42-yard field goal (9 plays, 35 yards, 2:58)	APP 31–3
2	04:35	TROY	Kaylon Geiger 33-yard pass from Gunnar Watson (Evan Legassey kick) (4 plays, 85 yards, 0:57)	APP 31–10
2	07:58	APP	Chandler Staton 30-yard field goal (15 plays, 62 yards, 4:32)	APP 34–10
3	06:02	APP	Henry Pearson 6-yard pass from Zac Thomas (Chandler Staton PAT failed) (10 plays, 75 yards, 5:24)	APP 40–10
3	00:17	APP	Caleb Spurlin 2-yard pass from Zac Thomas (Chandler Staton kick) (7 plays, 75 yards, 3:58)	APP 47–10

Statistics	Troy	Appalachian State
First downs	13	26
Total yards	231	554
Rushing yards	106	275
Passing yards	125	279
Turnovers	1	3
Time of possession	29:39	30:21

Team	Category	Player	Statistics
Troy	Passing	Gunnar Watson	13/20, 125 yards, 1 TD, 1 INT
Troy	Rushing	Jamontez Woods	10 carries, 43 yards
Troy	Receiving	Kaylon Geiger	3 receptions, 41 yards, 1 TD
Appalachian State	Passing	Zac Thomas	22/29, 279 yards, 4 TDs
Appalachian State	Rushing	Camerun Peoples	10 carries, 95 yards, 1 TD
Appalachian State	Receiving	Malik Williams	7 receptions, 113 yards, 1 TD

=== Louisiana ===
Louisiana at Appalachian State

Team	1	2	3	4	Total
• No. 25 Ragin' Cajuns	0	9	15	0	24
Mountaineers	7	3	0	11	21

- Date: December 4, 2020
- Location: Kidd Brewer Stadium
  Boone, NC
- Game start: 8:40 p.m. EST
- Elapsed time: 3 hours and 22 minutes
- Game attendance: 2,170
- Game weather: 42 °F (6 °C) • Weather: Rainy and Wet • Wind: Light
- Referee: Wayne Winkler
- TV announcers (ESPN): Jason Benetti (play–by–play), Andre Ware (analyst), and Marty Smith (sideline reporter)

Scoring summary
1	06:50	APP	Nate Noel 33-yard rush (Chandler Staton kick) (8 plays, 50 yards, 3:34)	APP 7–0
2	06:25	LA	Trey Ragas 8-yard pass from Levi Lewis (two-point pass conversion attempt failed) (6 plays, 49 yards, 3:14)	APP 7–6
2	00:26	APP	Chandler Staton 43-yard field goal (8 plays, 23 yards, 2:25)	APP 10–6
2	00:00	LA	Kenneth Almendares 26-yard field goal (6 plays, 46 yards, 0:26)	APP 10–9
3	07:52	LA	Trey Ragas 17-yard rush (Levi Lewis two-point conversion rush) (9 plays, 52 yards, 3:45)	LA 17–10
3	00:29	LA	Trey Ragas 1-yard rush (Kenneth Almendares kick) (10 plays, 74 yards, 5:43)	LA 24–10
4	08:17	APP	Camerun Peoples 1-yard rush (Chandler Staton kick) (14 plays, 80 yards, 7:12)	LA 24–17
4	06:36	APP	Team Safety (4 plays, -26 yards, 1:41)	LA 24–19
4	01:46	APP	Team Safety (4 plays, -27 yards, 0:23)	LA 24–21

Statistics	Louisiana	Appalachian State
First downs	18	19
Total yards	227	290
Rushing yards	126	198
Passing yards	101	92
Turnovers	0	3
Time of possession	24:17	35:43

Team	Category	Player	Statistics
Louisiana	Passing	Levi Lewis	8/23, 101 yards, 1 TD
Louisiana	Rushing	Elijah Mitchell	12 carries, 95 yards
Louisiana	Receiving	Jalen Williams	2 receptions, 39 yards
Appalachain State	Passing	Zac Thomas	10/21, 92 yards, 2 INTs
Appalachain State	Rushing	Camerun Peoples	21 carries, 99 yards, 1 TD
Appalachain State	Receiving	Thomas Hennigan	4 receptions, 44 yards

=== At Georgia Southern ===
Appalachian State at Georgia Southern

Team	1	2	3	4	Total
• Mountaineers	0	7	10	17	34
Eagles	7	10	0	9	26

- Date: December 12, 2020
- Location: Paulson Stadium
  Statesboro, GA
- Game start: 6:05 p.m. EST
- Elapsed time: 3 hours and 17 minutes
- Game attendance: 6,228
- Referee: Kyle Olson
- TV announcers (ESPN3): Matt Stewart (play–by–play) and Danny Waugh (analyst)

Scoring summary
1	01:59	GASO	David Spaulding 28-yard interception returned (Alex Raynor kick) (2 plays, 3 yards, 0:40)	GASO 7–0
2	09:22	GASO	Justin Tomlin 14-yard rush (Alex Raynor kick) (11 plays, 72 yards, 5:38)	GASO 14–0
2	01:55	APP	Jalen Virgil 16-yard pass from Zac Thomas (Chandler Staton kick) (17 plays, 65 yards, 7:27)	GASO 14–7
2	00:00	GASO	Alex Raynor 33-yard field goal (7 plays, 50 yards, 1:10)	GASO 17–7
3	10:44	APP	Thomas Hennigan 9-yard pass from Zac Thomas (Chandler Staton kick) (10 plays, 72 yards, 4:10)	GASO 17–14
3	04:20	APP	Chandler Staton 33-yard field goal (8 plays, 41 yards, 4:07)	TIE 17–17
4	14:51	GASO	Alex Raynor 47-yard field goal (10 plays, 46 yards, 4:29)	GASO 20–17
4	14:36	APP	Jalen Virgil 100-yard kickoff returned (Chandler Staton kick); 0 plays, 0 yards, 0:00)	APP 24–20
4	12:51	APP	Nate Noel 70-yard rush (Chandler Staton kick) (1 play, 70 yards, 0:12)	APP 31–20
4	05:23	GASO	Dexter Carter Jr. 78-yard pass from Miller Mosley (two-point pass conversion attempt failed) (2 plays, 85 yards, 0:34)	APP 31–26
4	02:44	APP	Chandler Staton 37-yard field goal (7 plays, 55 yards, 2:39)	APP 34–26

Statistics	Appalachian State	Georgia Southern
First downs	17	16
Total yards	381	349
Rushing yards	173	204
Passing yards	208	145
Turnovers	2	4
Time of possession	34:52	25:08

Team	Category	Player	Statistics
Appalachian State	Passing	Zac Thomas	18/29, 208 yards, 2 TDs, 1 INT
Appalachian State	Rushing	Nate Noel	13 carries, 103 yards, 1 TD
Appalachian State	Receiving	Thomas Hennigan	8 receptions, 64 yards, 1 TD
Georgia Southern	Passing	Miller Mosley	5/14, 122 yards, 1 TD, 2 INTs
Georgia Southern	Rushing	Justin Tomlin	6 carries, 76 yards, 1 TD
Georgia Southern	Receiving	Dexter Carter Jr.	1 reception, 78 yards, 1 TD

=== Vs. North Texas (Myrtle Beach Bowl) ===
North Texas vs. Appalachian State

Team	1	2	3	4	Total
Mean Green	0	14	7	7	28
• Mountaineers	14	21	7	14	56

- Date: December 21, 2020
- Location: Brooks Stadium
  Conway, SC
- Game start: 2:30 p.m. EST
- Elapsed time: 3 hours and 39 minutes
- Game attendance: 5,000
- Game weather: 55 °F (13 °C) • Weather: Clear • Wind: 6 MPH
- Referee: Luke Richmond
- TV announcers (ESPN): Courtney Lyle (play–by–play), Eric Mac Lain, (analyst), Marty Smith, and Ryan McGee (sideline reporters)

Scoring summary
1	10:54	APP	Henry Pearson 22-yard pass from Malik Williams (Chandler Staton kick) (4 plays, 73 yards, 1:13)	APP 7–0
1	03:07	APP	Camerun Peoples 3-yard rush (Chandler Staton kick) (12 plays, 90 yards, 5:05)	APP 14–0
2	13:41	UNT	Loronzo Thompson 16-yard pass from Kason Martin (Ethan Mooney kick) (12 plays, 75 yards, 4:26)	APP 14–7
2	06:04	APP	Henry Parson 11-yard pass from Zac Thomas (Chandler Staton kick) (5 plays, 59 yards, 1:48)	APP 21–7
2	02:29	APP	Marcus Williams 70-yard rush (Chandler Staton kick) (1 play, 70 yards, 0:13)	APP 28–7
2	00:27	UNT	Oscar Adaway III 4-yard rush (Ethan Mooney kick) (9 plays, 75 yards, 2:02)	APP 28–14
2	00:11	APP	Camerun Peoples 64-yard rush (Chandler Staton kick) (1 play, 64 yards, 0:16)	APP 35–14
3	06:14	UNT	Austin Ogunmakin 34-yard pass from Jason Bean (Ethan Mooney kick) (11 plays, 74 yards, 4:08)	APP 35–21
3	02:58	APP	Camerun Peoples 62-yard rush (Chandler Staton kick) (1 play, 62 yards, 0:11)	APP 42–21
4	14:16	APP	Camerun Peoples 1-yard rush (Chandler Staton kick) (4 plays, 79 yards, 1:19)	APP 49–21
4	09:03	APP	Camerun Peoples 1-yard rush (Chandler Staton kick) (5 plays, 20 yards, 2:47)	APP 56–21
4	06:12	UNT	Loronzo Thompson 7-yard pass from Jason Bean (Ethan Mooney kick) (9 plays, 75 yards, 2:51)	APP 56–28

Statistics	North Texas	Appalachian State
First downs	30	22
Total yards	497	636
Rushing yards	230	500
Passing yards	267	136
Turnovers	1	0
Time of possession	31:54	28:06

Team	Category	Player	Statistics
North Texas	Passing	Jason Bean	21/36, 251 yards, 2 TDs, 1 INT
North Texas	Rushing	Tre Siggers	17 carries, 120 yards
North Texas	Receiving	Austin Ogunmakin	7 receptions, 131 yards, 1 TD
Appalachian State	Passing	Zac Thomas	8/16, 114 yards, 1 TD
Appalachian State	Rushing	Camerun Peoples	22 carries, 317 yards, 5 TDs
Appalachian State	Receiving	Henry Pearson	3 receptions, 47 yards, 2 TDs

== Rankings ==
Ranking movements Legend: ██ Increase in ranking ██ Decrease in ranking RV = Received votes
	Week															
Poll	Pre	1	2	3	4	5	6	7	8	9	10	11	12	13	14	Final
AP	RV	RV*	23	RV												
Coaches	RV	RV*	23	RV												
CFP	Not released															Not released

== Players drafted into the NFL ==
Round	Pick	Player	Position	NFL Club
5	178	Shemar Jean-Charles	CB	Green Bay Packers
