= Darrynton Evans =

American football player (born 1998)

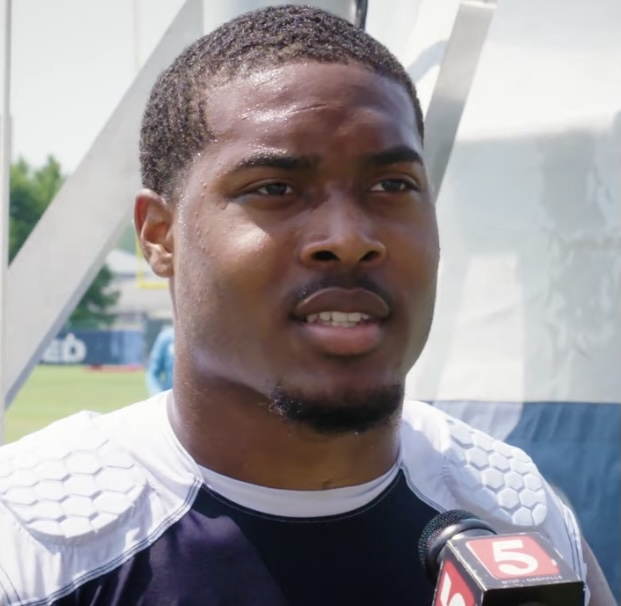
- Evans in 2021

Profile
- Positions: Running back, return specialist

Personal information
- Born: July 9, 1998 (age 28); Daytona Beach, Florida, U.S.
- Listed height: 5 ft 10 in (1.78 m)
- Listed weight: 203 lb (92 kg)

Career information
- High school: New Smyrna Beach (New Smyrna, Florida)
- College: Appalachian State (2016–2019)
- NFL draft: 2020: 3rd round, 93rd overall pick

Career history
- Tennessee Titans (2020–2021); Chicago Bears (2022); Indianapolis Colts (2023)*; Buffalo Bills (2023); Miami Dolphins (2023)*; Chicago Bears (2023); Miami Dolphins (2023); Buffalo Bills (2024); Chicago Bears (2024); Buffalo Bills (2025)*
- * Offseason or practice squad member only

Awards and highlights
- Sun Belt Offensive Player of the Year (2019); 2× First-team All-Sun Belt (2018, 2019)

Career NFL statistics as of 2024
- Rushing yards: 249
- Rushing average: 3.8
- Rushing touchdowns: 1
- Receptions: 12
- Receiving yards: 120
- Receiving touchdowns: 1
- Return yards: 223
- Stats at Pro Football Reference

Darrynton L.A. Evans (born July 9, 1998) is an American professional football running back and return specialist. He played college football for the Appalachian State Mountaineers and was selected by the Tennessee Titans in the third round of the 2020 NFL draft.

== Early life ==
Evans attended New Smyrna Beach High School in New Smyrna, Florida. He committed to Appalachian State University to play college football.

== College career ==
As a true freshman at Appalachian State in 2016, Evans played in 12 games rushing for 217 yards on 48 carries. He also returned 25 kicks for 563 yards and a touchdown. Evans missed 2017 due to injury and redshirted. Returning from the injury in 2018, he entered the season as a backup to Jalin Moore but took over as the starter after Moore was injured for the season, and rushed for 1,187 yards on 179 carries and seven touchdowns. As a kick returner he had 490 yards on 15 returns and had a touchdown. He was named the MVP of the 2018 Sun Belt Conference Football Championship Game after totaling 218 total yards. As a full-time starter in 2019, Evans was the Sun Belt Conference Offensive Player of the Year after rushing for 1,480 yards with 2,064 all purpose yards and 24 total touchdowns. He was also named MVP of the 2019 Sun Belt Conference Football Championship Game and 2019 New Orleans Bowl. After the season, he decided to forgo his senior season and enter the 2020 NFL draft.

== Professional career ==
Pre-draft measurables
Height	Weight	Arm length	Hand span	Wingspan	40-yard dash	10-yard split	20-yard split	Vertical jump	Broad jump	Bench press
5 ft 10 1/8 in (1.78 m)	203 lb (92 kg)	31 5/8 in (0.80 m)	9 1/4 in (0.23 m)	6 ft 4 5/8 in (1.95 m)	4.41 s	1.50 s	2.60 s	37.0 in (0.94 m)	10 ft 5 in (3.18 m)	20 reps
All values from NFL Combine

=== Tennessee Titans ===
Evans was selected by the Tennessee Titans with the 93rd overall pick in the third round of the 2020 NFL Draft.

He was placed on injured reserve on October 15, 2020, with a hamstring injury. He was activated on December 7, 2020. In Week 15 against the Detroit Lions, Evans recorded 57 yards from scrimmage and a receiving touchdown during the 46–25 win. This was Evans' first career touchdown.

Evans finished the 2020 season playing in five games with 14 rushes for 54 yards, two receptions for 27 yards and a receiving touchdown, and nine kickoff returns for 206 yards as a backup to rushing yards and touchdowns leader Derrick Henry. He recorded one carry for one yard in the Titans' 20–13 loss to the Baltimore Ravens in the wildcard round of the playoffs.

On September 2, 2021, Evans was placed on injured reserve. He was activated on October 23. On October 29, 2021 he was placed back on injured reserve for a second time ending his season.

On March 10, 2022, Evans was waived by the Titans.

=== Chicago Bears (first stint) ===
On March 11, 2022, Evans was claimed off waivers by the Chicago Bears. He was waived on August 30, 2022 and signed to the practice squad the next day. He was promoted to the active roster on November 27.

=== Indianapolis Colts ===
On March 31, 2023, Evans signed with the Indianapolis Colts. He was waived on May 2, 2023.

=== Buffalo Bills (first stint) ===
On July 25, 2023, Evans signed with the Buffalo Bills. He was released on August 29, 2023.

=== Miami Dolphins (first stint) ===
On August 31, 2023, Evans signed with the Miami Dolphins practice squad.

=== Chicago Bears (second stint) ===
On October 9, 2023, Evans was signed by the Bears off the Dolphins practice squad. He was waived on November 16.

=== Miami Dolphins (second stint) ===
On November 21, 2023, Evans was signed to the Dolphins practice squad. On November 23, 2023, Evans was elevated to the active roster. He was not signed to a reserve/future contract after the season and thus became a free agent upon the expiration of his practice squad contract.

=== Buffalo Bills (second stint) ===
On January 23, 2024, Evans signed a reserve/future contract with the Bills. He was placed on injured reserve on August 27. He was released on October 29.

=== Chicago Bears (third stint) ===
On November 6, 2024, Evans was signed to the Chicago Bears practice squad. He was promoted to the active roster on December 21.

=== Buffalo Bills (third stint) ===
On March 13, 2025, Evans signed a one-year contract with the Bills. He was placed on injured reserve on August 19, and later released.

== Personal life ==
Evans is a Christian. He is married to Aiyana Willoughby. He runs a YouTube and Twitch channel called ItzLiveee.
