= Beau Nunn =

American football player (born 1995)

No. 67
- Position: Guard

Personal information
- Born: June 12, 1995 (age 31); York, South Carolina, U.S.
- Listed height: 6 ft 3 in (1.91 m)
- Listed weight: 304 lb (138 kg)

Career information
- High school: York (SC) Comprehensive
- College: Appalachian State
- NFL draft: 2018: undrafted

Career history
- Detroit Lions (2018)*; San Diego Fleet (2019)
- * Offseason or practice squad member only

Awards and highlights
- First-team All-Sun Belt (2017); Second-team All-Sun Belt (2016)

Beau Nunn (born June 12, 1995) is an American former football guard. He played college football for Appalachian State, where he started 41 of 43 games in his collegiate career and was First-team All Sun Belt Conference his senior season.

== Professional career ==
Nunn signed for the Detroit Lions as an undrafted free agent on May 11, 2018. He was waived on July 27, 2018. He was re-signed on August 20, 2018, only to be waived nine days later.

On October 14, 2018, Nunn signed with the San Diego Fleet. The league ceased operations in April 2019.
