= 2020 Myrtle Beach Bowl =

Postseason college football bowl game

- 1st Myrtle Beach Bowl
| Appalachian State Mountaineers | North Texas Mean Green |
| (8–3) | (4–5) |
| Sun Belt | C-USA |
| 56 | 28 |
| Head coach: Shawn Clark | Head coach: Seth Littrell |
| | 1 | 2 | 3 | 4 | Total |
|---|---|---|---|---|---|
| Appalachian State | 14 | 21 | 7 | 14 | 56 |
| North Texas | 0 | 14 | 7 | 7 | 28 |
- Date: December 21, 2020
- Season: 2020
- Stadium: Brooks Stadium
- Location: Conway, South Carolina
- MVP: Camerun Peoples (RB, Appalachian State)
- Favorite: Appalachian State by 21.5
- Referee: Luke Richmond (The American)
- Attendance: 5,000

United States TV coverage
- Network: ESPN
- Announcers: Courtney Lyle (play-by-play); Eric Mac Lain (analyst); Marty Smith and Ryan McGee (sidelines)

International TV coverage
- Network: ESPN Deportes

The 2020 Myrtle Beach Bowl was a college football bowl game played on December 21, 2020, with kickoff at 2:30 p.m. EST on ESPN. It was the inaugural edition of the Myrtle Beach Bowl, and the first of the 2020–21 bowl games concluding the 2020 FBS football season. (Note: The Frisco Bowl had been scheduled for December 19, but was cancelled.) The game was the first NCAA bowl game to be played in the state of South Carolina, and the first bowl to be played in the state since the 1947 Pecan Bowl.

== Teams ==
The 2020 Myrtle Beach Bowl was contested by the Appalachian State Mountaineers, from the Sun Belt Conference, and the North Texas Mean Green, from Conference USA. The game was the first matchup between the two teams.

=== Appalachian State ===
Appalachian State of the Sun Belt accepted their bid on December 13, 2020. The Mountaineers entered the bowl with an overall record of 8–3 (6–2 in conference play); they were ranked at number 24 in the AP Poll early in the season.

=== North Texas ===
North Texas of C-USA accepted their bid on December 13, 2020. The Mean Green entered the bowl with an overall record of 4–5 (3–4 in conference play). This marked the third time in program history that North Texas entered a bowl game with a losing record (the prior instances being the 2001 New Orleans Bowl and the 2016 Heart of Dallas Bowl).

== Game summary ==
2020 Myrtle Beach Bowl

| Quarter | 1 | 2 | 3 | 4 | Total |
|---|---|---|---|---|---|
| Appalachian State | 14 | 21 | 7 | 14 | 56 |
| North Texas | 0 | 14 | 7 | 7 | 28 |

at Brooks Stadium • Conway, South Carolina

- Date: Monday, December 21, 2020
- Game time: 2:30 p.m. EST
- Game weather: Fair • Temperature: 56 °F (13 °C) • Wind: WSW 5 mph
- Referee: Luke Richmond (The American)
- TV announcers (ESPN): Courtney Lyle (play-by-play), Eric Mac Lain (analyst), Marty Smith and Ryan McGee (sidelines)
- ESPN game summary

Game information

First quarter

- (10:54) APP – Henry Pearson 22 yard pass from Malik Williams, Chandler Staton kick (Drive: 4 plays, 73 yards, 1:13; Appalachian State 7–0)
- (3:07) APP – Camerun Peoples 3 yard rush, Chandler Staton kick (Drive: 13 plays, 90 yards, 5:05; Appalachian State 14–0)

Second quarter

- (13:41) UNT – Lorenzo Thompson 16 yard pass from Kason Martin, Ethan Mooney kick (Drive: 12 plays, 75 yards, 4:26; Appalachian State 14–7)
- (6:04) APP – Henry Pearson 11 yard pass from Zac Thomas, Chandler Staton kick (Drive: 5 plays, 59 yards, 1:48; Appalachian State 21–7)
- (2:29) APP – Marcus Williams Jr. 70 yard rush, Chandler Staton kick (Drive: 1 play, 70 yards, 0:13; Appalachian State 28–7)
- (0:27) UNT – Oscar Adaway 4 yard rush, Ethan Mooney kick (Drive: 9 plays, 75 yards, 2:02; Appalachian State 28–14)
- (0:11) APP – Camerun Peoples 67 yard rush, Chandler Staton kick (Drive: 1 play, 64 yards, 0:11; Appalachian State 35–14)

Third quarter

- (6:14) UNT – Austin Ogunmakin 34 yard pass from Jason Bean, Ethan Mooney kick (Drive: 11 plays, 74 yards, 2:52; Appalachian State 35–21)
- (2:58) APP – Camerun Peoples 62 yard rush, Chandler Staton kick (Drive: 1 play, 62 yards, 0:11; Appalachian State 42–21)

Fourth quarter

- (14:16) APP – Camerun Peoples 1 yard rush, Chandler Staton kick (Drive: 4 plays, 79 yards, 1:19; Appalachian State 49–21)
- (9:03) APP – Camerun Peoples 11 yard rush, Chandler Staton kick (Drive: 5 plays, 20 yards, 2:47; Appalachian State 56–21)
- (6:12) UNT – Lorenzo Thompson 7 yard pass from Jason Bean, Ethan Mooney kick (Drive: 9 plays, 75 yards, 2:51; Appalachian State 56–28)

=== Statistics ===
| Statistics | APP | UNT |
|---|---|---|
| First downs | 22 | 30 |
| Plays–yards | 58–638 | 96–509 |
| Rushes–yards | 40–502 | 59–242 |
| Passing yards | 136 | 267 |
| Passing: comp–att–int | 9–18–0 | 22–37–1 |
| Time of possession | 24:53 | 35:07 |

| Team | Category | Player | Statistics |
|---|---|---|---|
| Appalachian State | Passing | Zac Thomas | 8/17, 114 yards, 1 TD |
| Appalachian State | Rushing | Camerun Peoples | 23 carries, 319 yards, 5 TD |
| Appalachian State | Receiving | Henry Pearson | 3 receptions, 47 yards, 2 TD |
| North Texas | Passing | Jason Bean | 21/36, 251 yards, 2 TD, 1 INT |
| North Texas | Rushing | Tre Siggers | 17 carries, 120 yards |
| North Texas | Receiving | Austin Ogunmakin | 7 receptions, 131 yards, 1 TD |
