= 2019 New Orleans Bowl =

Postseason college football bowl game

2019 R+L Carriers New Orleans Bowl
- 19th New Orleans Bowl
Appalachian State Mountaineers	UAB Blazers
(12–1)	(9–4)
Sun Belt	C-USA
31	17
Head coach: Shawn Clark	Head coach: Bill Clark
AP / Coaches / CFP; 20 / 20 / 20
	1	2	3	4	Total
Appalachian State	0	10	21	0	31
UAB	14	0	3	0	17
- Date: December 21, 2019
- Season: 2019
- Stadium: Mercedes-Benz Superdome
- Location: New Orleans, Louisiana
- MVP: Darrynton Evans (RB, Appalachian State)
- Favorite: Appalachian State by 17
- Referee: Ron Hudson (MAC)
- Attendance: 21,202
- Payout: US$825,000

United States TV coverage
- Network: ESPN & ESPN Radio
- Announcers: ESPN: Beth Mowins (play-by-play), Anthony Becht (analyst) and Rocky Boiman (sideline); ESPN Radio: Sean Kelley (play-by-play), Barrett Jones (analyst) and Ian Fitzsimmons (sideline)

The 2019 New Orleans Bowl was a college football bowl game played on December 21, 2019, with kickoff at 9:00 p.m. EST (8:00 p.m. local CST) on ESPN. It was the 19th edition of the New Orleans Bowl, and one of the 2019–20 bowl games concluding the 2019 FBS football season. Sponsored by freight shipping company R+L Carriers, the game was officially known as the R+L Carriers New Orleans Bowl.

== Teams ==
The game was played between the Sun Belt Conference champions Appalachian State Mountaineers and the UAB Blazers of Conference USA (C–USA). It was the first New Orleans Bowl to feature a ranked team, as Appalachian State entered the game at No. 20 in the AP Poll, Coaches Poll, and CFP rankings. It also was the first time that UAB and Appalachian State ever played each other.

=== Appalachian State Mountaineers ===
Appalachian State entered the New Orleans Bowl with an overall 12–1 record (7–1 in conference), having won the Sun Belt Championship Game over Louisiana. This was Appalachian State's second New Orleans Bowl, both consecutively and overall; the Mountaineers entered the game as the defending New Orleans Bowl champions, having won the 2018 edition over Middle Tennessee, 45–13.

=== UAB Blazers ===
UAB entered the bowl with a 9–4 record (6–2 in conference). The Blazers finished tied with Louisiana Tech atop C–USA's West Division, then lost the C–USA Championship Game to Florida Atlantic, 49–6.

== Game summary ==
2019 R+L Carriers New Orleans Bowl

Quarter	1	2	3	4	Total
No. 20 Appalachian State	0	10	21	0	31
UAB	14	0	3	0	17

at Mercedes-Benz Superdome • New Orleans, Louisiana

- Date: Saturday, December 21, 2019
- Game time: 9:00 p.m. EST (8:00 p.m. CST)
- Game weather: n/a (game played indoors)
- Game attendance: 21,202
- Referee: Ron Hudson
- TV announcers (ESPN): Beth Mowins (play-by-play), Anthony Becht (analyst) and Rocky Boiman (sideline)
- ESPN game summary

Game information

First Quarter

- (13:46) UAB – Tyler Johnston III 25 yard pass to Hayden Pittman, Nick Vogel kick (Drive: 4 plays, 75 yards, 1:14; UAB 7–0)
- (10:28) UAB – Tyler Johnston III 25 yard pass to Austin Watkins, Nick Vogel kick (Drive: 4 plays, 79 yards, 1:23; UAB 14–0)

Second Quarter

- (14:11) APP – Chandler Staton 34 yard field goal (Drive: 7 plays, 58 yards, 3:21; UAB 14–3)
- (7:59) APP – Zac Thomas 17 yard pass to Thomas Hennigan, Chandler Staton kick (Drive: 7 plays, 81 yards, 4:24; UAB 14–10)

Third Quarter

- (12:14) APP – Darrynton Evans 31 yard rush, Chandler Staton kick (Drive: 7 plays, 75 yards, 2:46; Appalachian State 17–14)
- (8:19) UAB – Nick Vogel kick (Drive: 7 plays, 44 yards, 3:55; Tied 17–17)
- (6:16) APP – Trey Cobb 24 yard fumble return, Chandler Staton kick (Appalachian State 24–17)
- (0:44) APP – Zac Thomas 27 yard pass to Thomas Hennigan, Chandler Staton kick (Drive: 9 plays, 85 yards, 3:56; Appalachian State 31–17)

Fourth Quarter
No scoring

=== Statistics ===
Statistics	APP	UAB
First downs	19	20
Plays–yards	65–403	67–338
Rushes–yards	40–261	33–40
Passing yards	142	298
Passing: comp–att–int	13–25–0	22–34–1
Time of possession	32:57	27:03

Team	Category	Player	Statistics
Appalachian State	Passing	Zac Thomas	13–24, 142 yds, 2 TD
Appalachian State	Rushing	Darrynton Evans	19 car., 156 yds, 1 TD
Appalachian State	Receiving	Jalen Virgil	3 rec., 62 yds
UAB	Passing	Tyler Johnston III	22–34, 298 yds, 2 TD, 1 INT
UAB	Rushing	Spencer Brown	14 car., 39 yds
UAB	Receiving	Austin Watkins	10 rec., 159 yds, 1 TD
