= 2020 North Texas Mean Green football team =

American college football season

2020 North Texas Mean Green football
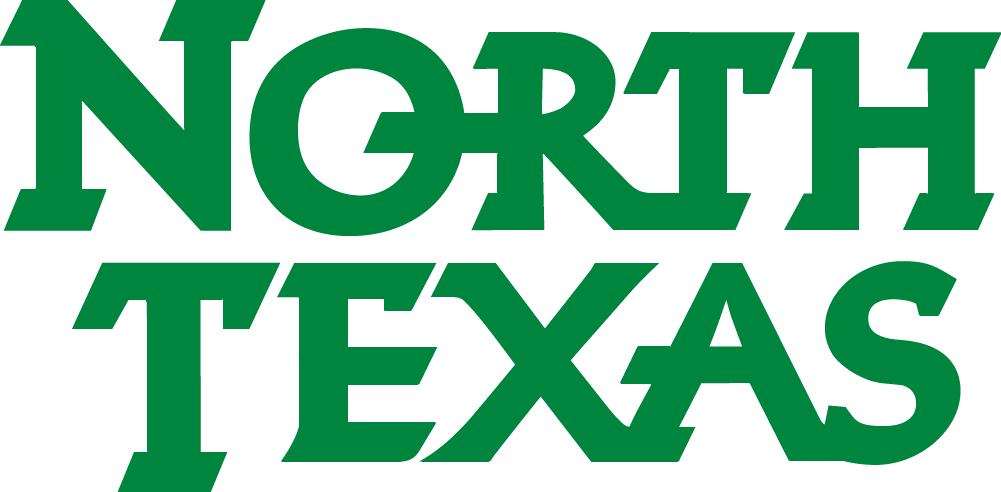

Myrtle Beach Bowl, L 28–56 vs. Appalachian State
- Conference: Conference USA
- West Division
- Record: 4–6 (3–4 C-USA)
- Head coach: Seth Littrell (5th season)
- Co-offensive coordinators: Tommy Mainord (2nd season); Mike Bloesch (1st season)
- Offensive scheme: Spread
- Defensive coordinator: Clint Bowen (2nd season)
- Base defense: 3–3–5
- Home stadium: Apogee Stadium

2020 Conference USA football standings
| | Conf. | | | Overall |
| Team | W | | L | W | | L |
|---|---|---|---|---|---|---|
East Division
| Marshall xy | 4 | – | 1 | 7 | – | 3 |
| Florida Atlantic | 4 | – | 2 | 5 | – | 4 |
| Western Kentucky | 4 | – | 3 | 5 | – | 7 |
| Charlotte | 2 | – | 2 | 2 | – | 4 |
| Middle Tennessee | 2 | – | 4 | 3 | – | 6 |
| FIU | 0 | – | 3 | 0 | – | 5 |
West Division
| UAB xy$ | 3 | – | 1 | 6 | – | 3 |
| UTSA | 5 | – | 2 | 7 | – | 5 |
| Louisiana Tech | 4 | – | 2 | 5 | – | 5 |
| North Texas | 3 | – | 4 | 4 | – | 6 |
| Rice | 2 | – | 3 | 2 | – | 3 |
| Southern Miss | 2 | – | 4 | 3 | – | 7 |
| UTEP | 0 | – | 4 | 3 | – | 5 |
Championship: UAB 22, Marshall 13
$ – Conference champion; x – Division champion/co-champions; y – Championship game participant; Note: Due to COVID-19, Old Dominion opted out of the season.

The 2020 North Texas Mean Green football team represented the University of North Texas as a member of Conference USA (C-USA) during the 2020 NCAA Division I FBS football season. Led by fifth-year head coach Seth Littrell, the Mean Green compiled an overall record of 4–6 with a mark 3–4 in conference play, placing in a three-way tie for fourth in C-USA's West Division. North Texas was invited to the Myrtle Beach Bowl, where the Mean Green lost to Appalachian State. The team played home games at Apogee Stadium in Denton, Texas.

== Schedule ==
North Texas announced its 2020 football schedule on January 8, 2020. The original schedule consisted of six home and six away games in the regular season. The Mean Green had a game scheduled against Texas A&M, which was canceled due to the COVID-19 pandemic.

| Date | Time | Opponent | Site | TV | Result | Attendance |
|---|---|---|---|---|---|---|
| September 5 | 6:30 p.m. | Houston Baptist* | Apogee Stadium; Denton, TX | ESPN3 | W 57–31 | 7,611 |
| September 19 | 5:00 p.m. | SMU* | Apogee Stadium; Denton, TX (Safeway Bowl) | CBSSN | L 35–65 | 8,464 |
| October 3 | 6:30 p.m. | Southern Miss | Apogee Stadium; Denton, TX | Stadium | L 31–41 | 6,490 |
| October 10 | 7:00 p.m. | Charlotte | Apogee Stadium; Denton, TX | ESPNU | L 21–49 | 6,864 |
| October 17 | 4:00 p.m. | at Middle Tennessee | Johnny "Red" Floyd Stadium; Murfreesboro, TN | Stadium | W 52–35 | 5,000 |
| November 21 | 1:00 p.m. | Rice | Apogee Stadium; Denton, TX | ESPN3 | W 27–17 | 5,976 |
| November 28 | 2:00 p.m. | at UTSA | Alamodome; San Antonio, TX | Stadium | L 17–49 | 5,936 |
| December 3 | 5:00 p.m. | Louisiana Tech | Apogee Stadium; Denton, TX | CBSSN | L 31–42 | 6,085 |
| December 11 | 5:00 p.m. | UTEP | Apogee Stadium; Denton, TX | ESPN3 | W 45–43 | 5,612 |
| December 21 | 2:30 p.m. | vs. Appalachian State* | Brooks Stadium; Conway, SC (Myrtle Beach Bowl) | ESPN | L 28–56 | 5,000 |
*Non-conference game; All times are in Central time

== Rankings ==
Ranking movements Legend: — = Not ranked RV = Received votes
| | Week | | | | | | | | | | | | | | | |
| Poll | Pre | 1 | 2 | 3 | 4 | 5 | 6 | 7 | 8 | 9 | 10 | 11 | 12 | 13 | 14 | Final |
|---|---|---|---|---|---|---|---|---|---|---|---|---|---|---|---|---|
| AP | — | | | | | | | | | | | | | | | |
| Coaches | — | | RV | | | | | | | | | | | | | |
| CFP | Not released | | | | | | | | | | | | | | | Not released |

== Game summaries ==
=== Houston Baptist ===
Houston Baptist at North Texas

| Team | 1 | 2 | 3 | 4 | Total |
|---|---|---|---|---|---|
| Huskies | 0 | 10 | 7 | 14 | 31 |
| • Mean Green | 14 | 9 | 20 | 14 | 57 |

- Date: September 5, 2020
- Location: Apogee Stadium
  Denton, TX
- Game start: 6:35 p.m. CDT
- Elapsed time: 3 hours and 35 minutes
- Game attendance: 7,611
- Game weather: 77 °F (25 °C) • Weather: Cloudy • Wind: S 5 MPH
- Referee: Billy Williams
- TV announcers (ESPN3): Doug Anderson (play–by–play) and LaDarrin McLane (analyst)

Scoring summary
| 1 | 12:31 | UNT | Jaelon Darden 33-yard pass from Jason Bean (Zach Williams kick) (10 plays, 75 yards, 2:29) | UNT 7–0 |
| 1 | 06:07 | UNT | Greg White 32-yard pass from Jason Bean (Zach Williams kick) (8 plays, 95 yards, 2:16) | UNT 14–0 |
| 2 | 14:35 | UNT | Jaelon Darden 19-yard pass from Jason Bean (Zach Williams PAT failed) (8 plays, 74 yards, 2:08) | UNT 20–0 |
| 2 | 09:39 | HBU | Josh Alfaro 7-yard pass from Bailey Zappe (Gino Garcia kick) (5 plays, 29 yards, 1:56) | UNT 20–7 |
| 2 | 01:18 | UNT | Zach Williams 30-yard field goal (9 plays, 67 yards, 3:07) | UNT 23–7 |
| 2 | 00:00 | HBU | Gino Garcia 50-yard field goal (5 plays, 42 yards, 1:18) | UNT 23–10 |
| 3 | 08:23 | UNT | Jason Bean 37-yard rush (two-point pass conversion attempt failed) (7 plays, 67 yards, 2:18) | UNT 29–10 |
| 3 | 07:08 | UNT | Oscar Adaway III 35-yard rush (Zach Williams kick) (3 plays, 79 yards, 0:38) | UNT 36–10 |
| 3 | 03:37 | UNT | Jaelon Darden 6-yard pass from Austin Aune (Zach Williams kick) (8 plays, 70 yards, 2:19) | UNT 43–10 |
| 3 | 00:30 | HBU | Blaise Bentsen 1-yard rush (Gino Garcia kick) (10 plays, 75 yards, 3:07) | UNT 43–17 |
| 4 | 14:25 | UNT | Oscar Adaway III 47-yard rush (Zach Williams kick) (4 plays, 75 yards, 1:05) | UNT 50–17 |
| 4 | 11:19 | UNT | Isaiah Johnson 16-yard rush (Zach Williams kick) (7 plays, 55 yards, 1:56) | UNT 57–17 |
| 4 | 09:36 | HBU | Ben Ratzlaff 71-yard pass from Bailey Zappe (Gino Garcia kick) (6 plays, 97 yards, 1:43) | UNT 57–24 |
| 4 | 05:36 | HBU | Josh Sterns 38-yard pass from Bailey Zappe (Gino Garcia kick) (6 plays, 77 yards, 1:59) | UNT 57–31 |

| Statistics | Houston Baptist | North Texas |
|---|---|---|
| First downs | 28 | 33 |
| Total yards | 569 | 721 |
| Rushing yards | 89 | 360 |
| Passing yards | 480 | 361 |
| Turnovers | 0 | 1 |
| Time of possession | 31:41 | 28:19 |

| Team | Category | Player | Statistics |
|---|---|---|---|
| Houston Baptist | Passing | Bailey Zappe | 39/62, 480 yards, 3 TDs |
| Houston Baptist | Rushing | Ean Beeks | 12 carries, 48 yards |
| Houston Baptist | Receiving | Ben Ratzlaff | 6 receptions, 108 yards, 1 TD |
| North Texas | Passing | Jason Bean | 11/18, 217 yards, 3 TDs, 1 INT |
| North Texas | Rushing | Oscar Adaway III | 5 carries, 118 yards, 2 TDs |
| North Texas | Receiving | Greg White | 2 receptions, 76 yards, 1 TD |

=== SMU ===
Southern Methodist at North Texas

| Team | 1 | 2 | 3 | 4 | Total |
|---|---|---|---|---|---|
| • RV Mustangs | 21 | 13 | 21 | 10 | 65 |
| Mean Green | 0 | 7 | 14 | 14 | 35 |

- Date: September 19, 2020
- Location: Apogee Stadium
  Denton, TX
- Game start: 5:02 p.m. CDT
- Elapsed time: 3 hours and 53 minutes
- Game attendance: 8,464
- Game weather: 79 °F (26 °C) • Weather: Clear • Wind: NE 8 MPH
- Referee: Tony Calabrese
- TV announcers (CBS Sports Network): Carter Blackburn (play–by–play), Aaron Taylor (analyst), and Jenny Dell (sideline reporter)

Scoring summary
| 1 | 12:33 | SMU | Reggie Roberson Jr. 15-yard pass from Shane Buechele (Chris Naggar kick) (4 plays, 73 yards, 1:04) | SMU 7–0 |
| 1 | 09:44 | SMU | Danny Gray 62-yard pass from Shane Buechele (Chris Naggar kick) (3 plays, 74 yards, 0:56) | SMU 14–0 |
| 1 | 03:27 | SMU | Kylen Granson 7-yard pass from Shane Buechele (Chris Naggar kick) (9 plays, 80 yards, 2:39) | SMU 21–0 |
| 2 | 13:42 | SMU | Chris Naggar 37-yard field goal (8 plays, 4 yards, 3:39) | SMU 24–0 |
| 2 | 08:31 | UNT | Jaelon Darden 12-yard pass from Jason Bean (Ethan Mooney kick) (10 plays, 64 yards, 2:42) | SMU 24–7 |
| 2 | 03:02 | SMU | Chris Naggar 22-yard field goal (7 plays, 52 yards, 2:48) | SMU 27–7 |
| 2 | 00:18 | SMU | Shane Buechele 2-yard rush (Chris Naggar kick) (8 plays, 84 yards, 1:31) | SMU 34–7 |
| 3 | 12:02 | UNT | DeAndre Torrey 7-yard rush (Ethan Mooney kick) (6 plays, 34 yards, 1:48) | SMU 34–14 |
| 3 | 10:53 | SMU | Ulysses Bentley IV 4-yard rush (Chris Naggar kick) (4 plays, 36 yards, 1:09) | SMU 41–14 |
| 3 | 08:44 | UNT | Austin Aune 5-yard rush (Ethan Mooney kick) (8 plays, 75 yards, 2:09) | SMU 41–21 |
| 3 | 05:42 | SMU | Reggie Roberson Jr. 2-yard pass from Shane Buechele (Chris Naggar kick) (8 plays, 75 yards, 3:02) | SMU 48–21 |
| 3 | 00:11 | SMU | Ulysses Bentley IV 9-yard rush (Chris Naggar kick) (10 plays, 90 yards, 4:47) | SMU 55–21 |
| 4 | 14:02 | UNT | Jaelon Darden 33-yard pass from Austin Aune (Ethan Mooney kick) (6 plays, 78 yards, 1:09) | SMU 55–28 |
| 4 | 12:12 | SMU | Ulysses Bentley IV 84-yard rush (Chris Naggar kick) (3 plays, 93 yards, 1:50) | SMU 62–28 |
| 4 | 10:52 | UNT | Deonte Simpson 55-yard pass from Austin Aune (Ethan Mooney kick) (4 plays, 75 yards, 1:20) | SMU 62–35 |
| 4 | 05:33 | SMU | Chris Naggar 46-yard field goal (4 plays, -1 yards, 2:10) | SMU 65–35 |

| Statistics | SMU | North Texas |
|---|---|---|
| First downs | 33 | 25 |
| Total yards | 710 | 517 |
| Rushing yards | 366 | 212 |
| Passing yards | 344 | 305 |
| Turnovers | 0 | 2 |
| Time of possession | 34:31 | 25:29 |

| Team | Category | Player | Statistics |
|---|---|---|---|
| SMU | Passing | Shane Buechele | 24/33, 344 yards, 4 TDs |
| SMU | Rushing | Ulysses Bentley IV | 19 carries, 227 yards, 3 TDs |
| SMU | Receiving | Reggie Roberson Jr. | 9 receptions, 103 yards, 2 TDs |
| North Texas | Passing | Austin Aune | 13/25, 276 yards, 2 TDs, 1 INT |
| North Texas | Rushing | Oscar Adaway III | 20 carries, 104 yards |
| North Texas | Receiving | Jaelon Darden | 5 receptions, 66 yards, 2 TDs |

=== Southern Miss ===
Southern Mississippi at North Texas

| Team | 1 | 2 | 3 | 4 | Total |
|---|---|---|---|---|---|
| • Golden Eagles | 17 | 3 | 7 | 14 | 41 |
| Mean Green | 3 | 7 | 7 | 14 | 31 |

- Date: October 3, 2020
- Location: Apogee Stadium
  Denton, TX
- Game start: 6:36 p.m. CDT
- Elapsed time: 3 hours and 20 minutes
- Game attendance: 6,490
- Game weather: 81 °F (27 °C) • Weather: Sunny • Wind: NW 7 MPH
- Referee: Chris Bynum
- TV announcers (Stadium): Chris Hassel (play–by–play) and A. J. Hawk (analyst)

Scoring summary
| 1 | 12:36 | UNT | Ethan Mooney 49-yard field goal (10 plays, 24 yards, 2:24) | UNT 3–0 |
| 1 | 11:30 | USM | Demarcus Jones 22-yard pass from Jack Abraham (Briggs Bourgeois kick) (4 plays, 75 yards, 1:06) | USM 7–3 |
| 1 | 10:26 | USM | Frank Gore Jr. 11-yard rush (Briggs Bourgeois kick) (3 plays, 24 yards, 1:04) | USM 14–3 |
| 1 | 08:42 | USM | Briggs Bourgeois 31-yard field goal (4 plays, 6 yards, 1:26) | USM 21–3 |
| 2 | 01:54 | UNT | Tre Siggers 1-yard rush (Ethan Mooney kick) (14 plays, 80 yards, 4:30) | USM 17–10 |
| 2 | 00:44 | USM | Briggs Bourgeois 46-yard field goal (9 plays, 46 yards, 1:10) | USM 20–10 |
| 3 | 13:37 | USM | Jason Brownlee 68-yard pass from Jack Abraham (Briggs Bourgeois kick) (3 plays, 75 yards, 1:23) | USM 27–10 |
| 3 | 09:23 | UNT | Jaelon Darden 17-yard pass from Austin Aune (Ethan Mooney kick) (12 plays, 70 yards, 4:14) | USM 27–17 |
| 4 | 14:54 | USM | Darius Maberry 4-yard rush (Briggs Bourgeois kick) (4 plays, 22 yards, 1:59) | USM 34–17 |
| 4 | 13:11 | UNT | DeAndre Torrey 39-yard rush (Ethan Mooney kick) (8 plays, 74 yards, 1:43) | USM 34–24 |
| 4 | 06:16 | USM | Darius Maberry 14-yard rush (Briggs Bourgeois kick) (12 plays, 75 yards, 6:55) | USM 41–24 |
| 4 | 05:16 | UNT | Deonte Simpson 37-yard pass from Austin Aune (Ethan Mooney kick) (3 plays, 71 yards, 1:00) | USM 41–31 |

| Statistics | Southern Miss | North Texas |
|---|---|---|
| First downs | 22 | 27 |
| Total yards | 437 | 483 |
| Rushing yards | 202 | 144 |
| Passing yards | 235 | 339 |
| Turnovers | 1 | 3 |
| Time of possession | 35:16 | 24:44 |

| Team | Category | Player | Statistics |
|---|---|---|---|
| Southern Miss | Passing | Jack Abraham | 16/30, 235 yards, 2 TDs, 1 INT |
| Southern Miss | Rushing | Frank Gore Jr. | 23 carries, 103 yards, 1 TD |
| Southern Miss | Receiving | Jason Brownlee | 4 receptions, 110 yards, 1 TD |
| North Texas | Passing | Austin Aune | 28/47, 339 yards, 2 TDs |
| North Texas | Rushing | DeAndre Torrey | 15 carries, 82 yards, 1 TD |
| North Texas | Receiving | Deonte Simpson | 5 receptions, 113 yards, 1 TD |

=== Charlotte ===
Charlotte at North Texas

| Team | 1 | 2 | 3 | 4 | Total |
|---|---|---|---|---|---|
| • 49ers | 7 | 14 | 14 | 14 | 49 |
| Mean Green | 0 | 7 | 7 | 7 | 21 |

- Date: October 10, 2020
- Location: Apogee Stadium
  Denton, TX
- Game start: 7:02 p.m. CDT
- Elapsed time: 3 hours and 34 minutes
- Game attendance: 6,864
- Game weather: 86 °F (30 °C) • Weather: Clear • Wind: SE 3 MPH
- Referee: Rodney Burnette
- TV announcers (ESPNU): Roy Philpott (play–by–play) and Kelly Stouffer (analyst)

Scoring summary
| 1 | 04:34 | CHAR | Chris Reynolds 18-yard pass from Dom Shoffner (Jonathan Cruz kick) (5 plays, 51 yards, 2:29) | CHAR 7–0 |
| 2 | 14:06 | CHAR | Aaron McAllister 71-yard pass from Chris Reynolds (Jonathan Cruz kick) (4 plays, 96 yards, 2:41) | CHAR 14–0 |
| 2 | 12:16 | UNT | Jaelon Darden 28-yard pass from Austin Aune (Ethan Mooney kick) (6 plays, 75 yards, 1:50) | CHAR 14–7 |
| 2 | 03:21 | CHAR | Tre Harbison III 11-yard rush (Jonathan Cruz kick) (5 plays, 80 yards, 2:30) | CHAR 21–7 |
| 3 | 11:47 | CHAR | Chavon McEachern 1-yard rush (Jonathan Cruz kick) (7 plays, 75 yards, 3:13) | CHAR 28–7 |
| 3 | 10:54 | UNT | Jaelon Darden 43-yard pass from Austin Aune (Ethan Mooney kick) (4 plays, 65 yards, 0:53) | CHAR 28–14 |
| 3 | 04:10 | CHAR | Taylor Thomas 15-yard pass from Chris Reynolds (Jonathan Cruz kick) (4 plays, 74 yards, 2:05) | CHAR 35–14 |
| 4 | 12:06 | UNT | Jaelon Darden 9-yard pass from Austin Aune (Ethan Mooney kick) (7 plays, 49 yards, 1:33) | CHAR 35–21 |
| 4 | 11:08 | CHAR | Aaron McAllister 66-yard rush (Jonathan Cruz kick) (3 plays, 75 yards, 0:58) | CHAR 42–21 |
| 4 | 09:51 | CHAR | Calvin Camp 14-yard rush (Jonathan Cruz kick) (2 plays, 29 yards, 0:56) | CHAR 49–21 |

| Statistics | Charlotte | North Texas |
|---|---|---|
| First downs | 24 | 22 |
| Total yards | 599 | 479 |
| Rushing yards | 291 | 97 |
| Passing yards | 308 | 382 |
| Turnovers | 0 | 1 |
| Time of possession | 37:53 | 22:07 |

| Team | Category | Player | Statistics |
|---|---|---|---|
| Charlotte | Passing | Chris Reynolds | 15/22, 290 yards, 2 TDs |
| Charlotte | Rushing | Aaron McAllister | 12 carries, 140 yards, 1 TD |
| Charlotte | Receiving | Micaleous Elder | 5 receptions, 85 yards |
| North Texas | Passing | Austin Aune | 23/43, 382 yards, 3 TDs, 1 INT |
| North Texas | Rushing | DeAndre Torrey | 14 carries, 89 yards |
| North Texas | Receiving | Jaelon Darden | 13 receptions, 244 yards, 3 TDs |

=== At Middle Tennessee ===
North Texas at Middle Tennessee

| Team | 1 | 2 | 3 | 4 | Total |
|---|---|---|---|---|---|
| • Mean Green | 7 | 14 | 21 | 10 | 52 |
| Blue Raiders | 21 | 7 | 0 | 7 | 35 |

- Date: October 17, 2020
- Location: Johnny "Red" Floyd Stadium
  Murfreesboro, TN
- Game start: 4:06 p.m. CDT
- Elapsed time: 3 hours and 21 minutes
- Game attendance: 5,000
- Game weather: 67 °F (19 °C) • Weather: Sunny, nice • Wind: SSE 5 MPH
- Referee: Jonathan Noli
- TV announcers (Stadium): Chris Vosters (play–by–play) and Max Starks (analyst)

Scoring summary
| 1 | 08:35 | MTSU | Chaton Mobley 3-yard pass from Asher O'Hara (Crews Holt kick) (6 plays, 15 yards, 1:52) | MTSU 7–0 |
| 1 | 06:39 | UNT | DeAndre Torrey 1-yard rush (Ethan Mooney kick) (7 plays, 91 yards, 1:50) | TIE 7–7 |
| 1 | 02:23 | MTSU | Jarrin Pierce 2-yard pass from Asher O'Hara (Crews Holt kick) (11 plays, 75 yards, 4:16) | MTSU 14–7 |
| 1 | 01:35 | MTSU | Gregory Grate Jr. 20-yard fumble returned (Crews Holt kick) (2 plays, -9 yards, 0:40) | MTSU 21–7 |
| 2 | 09:39 | UNT | DeAndre Torrey 60-yard rush (Ethan Mooney kick) (5 plays, 99 yards, 1:38) | MTSU 21–14 |
| 2 | 03:58 | MTSU | DJ England-Chisolm 24-yard pass from Asher O'Hara (Crews Holt kick) (12 plays, 75 yards, 5:41) | MTSU 28–21 |
| 3 | 13:32 | UNT | Jason Bean 48-yard rush (Ethan Mooney kick) (5 plays, 74 yards, 1:22) | TIE 28–28 |
| 3 | 06:44 | UNT | Deonte Simpson 9-yard pass from Jason Bean (Ethan Mooney kick) (5 plays, 39 yards, 1:45) | UNT 35–28 |
| 3 | 00:10 | UNT | Jaelon Darden 55-yard pass from Jason Bean (Ethan Mooney kick) (5 plays, 79 yards, 1:34) | UNT 42–28 |
| 4 | 11:10 | UNT | Jason Bean 48-yard rush (Ethan Mooney kick) (5 plays, 75 yards, 2:24) | UNT 49–28 |
| 4 | 08:40 | MTSU | Chaton Mobley 30-yard rush (Crews Holt kick) (5 plays, 71 yards, 2:24) | UNT 49–35 |
| 4 | 03:59 | UNT | Ethan Mooney 44-yard field goal (9 plays, 50 yards, 4:31) | UNT 52–35 |

| Statistics | North Texas | Middle Tennessee |
|---|---|---|
| First downs | 32 | 23 |
| Total yards | 768 | 432 |
| Rushing yards | 462 | 268 |
| Passing yards | 306 | 164 |
| Turnovers | 3 | 1 |
| Time of possession | 27:52 | 32:08 |

| Team | Category | Player | Statistics |
|---|---|---|---|
| North Texas | Passing | Jason Bean | 12/17, 181 yards, 2 TDs |
| North Texas | Rushing | Jason Bean | 10 carries, 169 yards, 3 TDs |
| North Texas | Receiving | Jaelon Darden | 10 receptions, 204 yards, 1 TD |
| Middle Tennessee | Passing | Asher O'Hara | 18/29, 164 yards, 3 TDs, 1 INT |
| Middle Tennessee | Rushing | Chaton Mobley | 14 carries, 156 yards, 1 TD |
| Middle Tennessee | Receiving | CJ Windham | 4 receptions, 49 yards |

=== Rice ===
Rice at North Texas

| Team | 1 | 2 | 3 | 4 | Total |
|---|---|---|---|---|---|
| Owls | 10 | 0 | 0 | 7 | 17 |
| • Mean Green | 0 | 14 | 3 | 10 | 27 |

- Date: November 21, 2020
- Location: Apogee Stadium
  Denton, TX
- Game start: 1:05 p.m. CDT
- Elapsed time: 3 hours and 4 minutes
- Game attendance: 5,976
- Game weather: 73 °F (23 °C) • Weather: Partly Cloudy • Wind: S 11 MPH
- Referee: Jonathan Noli
- TV announcers (ESPN3): Doug Anderson (play–by–play) and LaDarrin McLane (analyst)

Scoring summary
| 1 | 11:11 | RICE | Collin Riccitelli 45-yard field goal (8 plays, 48 yards, 3:49) | RICE 3–0 |
| 1 | 04:26 | RICE | Austin Trammell 14-yard pass from Mike Collins (Collin Riccitelli kick) (7 plays, 97 yards, 4:01) | RICE 10–0 |
| 2 | 06:56 | UNT | Jason Bean 66-yard rush (Ethan Mooney kick) (4 plays, 89 yards, 1:17) | RICE 10–7 |
| 2 | 01:09 | UNT | Jaelon Darden 25-yard pass from Jason Bean (Ethan Mooney kick) (6 plays, 38 yards, 2:00 | UNT 14–10 |
| 3 | 09:56 | UNT | Ethan Mooney 27-yard field goal (13 plays, 55 yards, 5:04) | UNT 17–10 |
| 4 | 13:03 | UNT | Ethan Mooney 30-yard field goal (9 plays, 67 yards, 2:40) | UNT 20–10 |
| 4 | 07:27 | UNT | DeAndre Torrey 1-yard rush (Ethan Mooney kick) (6 plays, 39 yards, 2:43) | UNT 27–10 |
| 4 | 00:08 | RICE | Jake Bailey 17-yard pass from Mike Collins (Collin Riccitelli kick) (6 plays, 80 yards, 1:18) | UNT 27–17 |

| Statistics | Rice | North Texas |
|---|---|---|
| First downs | 23 | 17 |
| Total yards | 376 | 389 |
| Rushing yards | 49 | 269 |
| Passing yards | 327 | 120 |
| Turnovers | 2 | 0 |
| Time of possession | 36:25 | 23:35 |

| Team | Category | Player | Statistics |
|---|---|---|---|
| Rice | Passing | Mike Collins | 23/34, 327 yards, 2 TDs |
| Rice | Rushing | Khalan Griffin | 20 carries, 72 yards |
| Rice | Receiving | Austin Trammell | 6 receptions, 116 yards, 1 TD |
| North Texas | Passing | Jason Bean | 9/20, 120 yards, 1 TD |
| North Texas | Rushing | DeAndre Torrey | 19 carries, 102 yards, 1 TD |
| North Texas | Receiving | Austin Ogunmakin | 3 receptions, 60 yards |

=== At UTSA ===
North Texas at Texas–San Antonio

| Team | 1 | 2 | 3 | 4 | Total |
|---|---|---|---|---|---|
| Mean Green | 0 | 7 | 3 | 7 | 17 |
| • Roadrunners | 7 | 21 | 7 | 14 | 49 |

- Date: November 28, 2020
- Location: Alamodome
  San Antonio, TX
- Game start: 2:06 p.m. CST
- Elapsed time: 3 hours and 3 minutes
- Game attendance: 5,936
- Game weather: 72 °F (22 °C)
- Referee: Ken Antee
- TV announcers (FOX Sports SW): Chris Vosters (play–by–play) and Max Starks (analyst)

Scoring summary
| 1 | 02:38 | UTSA | Frank Harris 19-yard rush (Hunter Duplessis kick) (9 plays, 80 yards, 2:47) | UTSA 7–0 |
| 2 | 11:10 | UTSA | Joshua Cephus 8-yard pass from Frank Harris (Hunter Duplessis kick) (9 plays, 78 yards, 3:50) | UTSA 14–0 |
| 2 | 10:58 | UNT | Jaelon Darden 75-yard pass from Frank Harris (Ethan Mooney kick) (1 play, 75 yards, 0:12) | UTSA 14–7 |
| 2 | 10:26 | UTSA | Sincere McCormick 65-yard rush (Hunter Duplessis kick) (2 plays, 71 yards, 0:32) | UTSA 21–7 |
| 2 | 01:22 | UTSA | De'Corian Clark 15-yard pass from Frank Harris (Hunter Duplessis kick) (5 plays, 51 yards, 2:16) | UTSA 28–7 |
| 3 | 06:12 | UNT | Ethan Mooney 23-yard field goal (15 plays, 78 yards, 4:21) | UTSA 28–10 |
| 3 | 04:55 | UTSA | Brenden Brady 4-yard rush (Hunter Duplessis kick) (3 plays, 74 yards, 1:17) | UTSA 35–10 |
| 4 | 14:02 | UTSA | Sincere McCormick 18-yard rush (Hunter Duplessis kick) (6 plays, 65 yards, 4:08) | UTSA 42–10 |
| 4 | 07:12 | UTSA | B. J. Daniels 9-yard rush (Hunter Duplessis kick) (7 plays, 69 yards, 5:42) | UTSA 49–10 |
| 4 | 03:40 | UNT | Jason Pirtle 8-yard pass from Jason Bean (Ethan Mooney kick) (11 plays, 87 yards, 3:32) | UTSA 49–17 |

| Statistics | North Texas | UTSA |
|---|---|---|
| First downs | 19 | 26 |
| Total yards | 401 | 624 |
| Rushing yards | 184 | 443 |
| Passing yards | 217 | 181 |
| Turnovers | 2 | 0 |
| Time of possession | 24:19 | 35:41 |

| Team | Category | Player | Statistics |
|---|---|---|---|
| North Texas | Passing | Austin Aune | 9/19, 115 yards |
| North Texas | Rushing | Oscar Adaway III | 15 carries, 101 yards |
| North Texas | Receiving | Jaelon Darden | 8 receptions, 143 yards, 1 TD |
| UTSA | Passing | Frank Harris | 19/24, 144 yards, 2 TDs |
| UTSA | Rushing | Sincere McCormick | 23 carries, 251 yards, 2 TDs |
| UTSA | Receiving | Zakhari Franklin | 3 receptions, 49 yards |

=== Louisiana Tech ===
Louisiana Tech at North Texas

| Team | 1 | 2 | 3 | 4 | Total |
|---|---|---|---|---|---|
| • Bulldogs | 7 | 21 | 14 | 0 | 42 |
| Mean Green | 14 | 3 | 7 | 7 | 31 |

- Date: December 3, 2020
- Location: Apogee Stadium
  Denton, TX
- Game start: 5:02 p.m. CST
- Elapsed time: 3 hours and 27 minutes
- Game attendance: 6,085
- Game weather: 46 °F (8 °C) • Weather: Cloudy • Wind: NNW 14 MPH
- Referee: Joe Lehring
- TV announcers (CBS Sports Network): Chris Hassel (play–by–play) and Sed Bonner (analyst)

Scoring summary
| 1 | 10:25 | LT | Smoke Harris 12-yard rush (Jacob Barnes kick) (7 plays, 55 yards, 2:17) | LT 7–0 |
| 1 | 07:41 | UNT | Jaelon Darden 13-yard pass from Jason Bean (Ethan Mooney kick) (9 plays, 70 yards, 2:44) | TIE 7–7 |
| 1 | 04:45 | UNT | DeAndre Torrey 1-yard rush (Ethan Mooney kick) (5 plays, 75 yards, 1:10) | UNT 14–7 |
| 2 | 12:13 | LT | Greg Garner 1-yard rush (Jacob Barnes kick) (17 plays, 68 yards, 7:32) | TIE 14–14 |
| 2 | 07:40 | LT | Israel Tucker 2-yard rush (Jacob Barnes kick) (8 plays, 36 yards, 3:09) | LT 21–14 |
| 2 | 03:05 | UNT | Ethan Mooney 48-yard field goal (12 plays, 39 yards, 4:35) | LT 21–17 |
| 2 | 00:13 | LT | Kyle Maxwell 5-yard pass from Luke Anthony (Jacob Barnes kick) (9 plays, 64 yards, 2:52) | LT 28–17 |
| 3 | 05:13 | LT | Smoke Harris 6-yard pass from Luke Anthony (Jacob Barnes kick) (12 plays, 53 yards, 5:22) | LT 35–17 |
| 3 | 04:23 | UNT | Jaelon Darden 33-yard pass from Jason Bean (Ethan Mooney kick) (3 plays, 75 yards, 0:50) | LT 35–24 |
| 3 | 01:21 | LT | Israel Tucker 1-yard rush (Jacob Barnes kick) (7 plays, 58 yards, 3:02) | LT 42–24 |
| 4 | 10:37 | UNT | Jaelon Darden 10-yard pass from Jason Bean (Ethan Mooney kick) (8 plays, 52 yards, 2:03) | LT 42–31 |

| Statistics | Louisiana Tech | North Texas |
|---|---|---|
| First downs | 24 | 19 |
| Total yards | 341 | 386 |
| Rushing yards | 183 | 155 |
| Passing yards | 158 | 231 |
| Turnovers | 1 | 1 |
| Time of possession | 36:19 | 23:41 |

| Team | Category | Player | Statistics |
|---|---|---|---|
| Louisiana Tech | Passing | Luke Anthony | 13/20, 110 yards, 2 TDs, 1 INT |
| Louisiana Tech | Rushing | Israel Tucker | 37 carries, 161 yards, 2 TDs |
| Louisiana Tech | Receiving | Smoke Harris | 7 receptions, 40 yards, 1 TD |
| North Texas | Passing | Jason Bean | 17/30, 231 yards, 3 TDs, 1 INT |
| North Texas | Rushing | Nic Smith | 16 carries, 96 yards |
| North Texas | Receiving | Jaelon Darden | 8 receptions, 135 yards, 3 TDs |

=== UTEP ===
Texas–El Paso at North Texas

| Team | 1 | 2 | 3 | 4 | Total |
|---|---|---|---|---|---|
| Miners | 7 | 14 | 0 | 22 | 43 |
| • Mean Green | 7 | 10 | 14 | 14 | 45 |

- Date: December 11, 2020
- Location: Apogee Stadium
  Denton, TX
- Game start: 5:05 p.m. CST
- Elapsed time: 3 hours and 33 minutes
- Game attendance: 5,612
- Game weather: 60 °F (16 °C) • Weather: Partly Cloudy • Wind: NW 8 MPH
- Referee: Kevin Randall
- TV announcers (ESPN3): Kyle Youmans (play–by–play) and Hek'ma Harrison (analyst)

Scoring summary
| 1 | 07:24 | UTEP | Calvin Brownholtz 29-yard rush (Gavin Baechle kick) (6 plays, 33 yards, 4:01) | UTEP 7–0 |
| 1 | 02:38 | UNT | Deonte Simpson 46-yard pass from Austin Aune (Ethan Mooney kick) (1 play, 46 yards, 0:08) | TIE 7–7 |
| 2 | 14:23 | UTEP | Deion Hankins 2-yard rush (Gavin Baechle kick) (8 plays, 69 yards, 3:15) | UTEP 14–7 |
| 2 | 14:11 | UNT | Jaelon Darden 75-yard pass from Austin Aune (Ethan Mooney kick) (1 play, 75 yards, 0:12) | TIE 14–14 |
| 2 | 04:43 | UNT | Ethan Mooney 24-yard field goal (8 plays, 44 yards, 2:52) | UNT 17–14 |
| 2 | 00:43 | UTEP | Deion Hankins 7-yard rush (Gavin Baechle kick) (8 plays, 67 yards, 1:19) | UTEP 21–17 |
| 3 | 08:06 | UNT | Jaelon Darden 32-yard pass from Austin Aune (Ethan Mooney kick) (5 plays, 48 yards, 1:17) | UNT 24–21 |
| 3 | 02:04 | UNT | Austin Aune 4-yard rush (Ethan Mooney kick) (12 plays, 81 yards, 3:58) | UNT 31–21 |
| 4 | 14:21 | UTEP | Jacob Cowing 28-yard pass from Calvin Brownholtz (Gavin Baechle kick) (7 plays, 69 yards, 2:43) | UNT 31–28 |
| 4 | 11:49 | UNT | Jaelon Darden 2-yard pass from Austin Aune (Ethan Mooney kick) (8 plays, 62 yards, 2:32) | UNT 38–28 |
| 4 | 08:40 | UNT | Jaelon Darden 50-yard pass from Austin Aune (Ethan Mooney kick) (5 plays, 65 yards, 1:18) | UNT 45–28 |
| 4 | 06:32 | UTEP | Jacob Cowing 17-yard pass from Calvin Brownholtz (Calvin Brownholtz two-point conversion pass to Trent Thompson) (5 plays, 75 yards, 2:08) | UNT 45–36 |
| 4 | 00:26 | UTEP | Calvin Brownholtz 5-yard rush (Gavin Baechle kick) (6 plays, 69 yards, 1:00) | UNT 45–43 |

| Statistics | UTEP | North Texas |
|---|---|---|
| First downs | 27 | 24 |
| Total yards | 497 | 491 |
| Rushing yards | 301 | 189 |
| Passing yards | 196 | 302 |
| Turnovers | 4 | 1 |
| Time of possession | 35:45 | 24:15 |

| Team | Category | Player | Statistics |
|---|---|---|---|
| UTEP | Passing | Calvin Brownholtz | 10/26, 196 yards, 2 TDs, 4 INTs |
| UTEP | Rushing | Calvin Brownholtz | 15 carries, 114 yards, 2 TDs |
| UTEP | Receiving | Jacob Cowing | 5 receptions, 118 yards, 2 TDs |
| North Texas | Passing | Austin Aune | 16/29, 302 yards, 5 TDs |
| North Texas | Rushing | Tre Siggers | 15 carries, 94 yards |
| North Texas | Receiving | Jaelon Darden | 8 receptions, 173 yards, 4 TDs |

=== Vs. Appalachian State—Myrtle Beach Bowl ===
Appalachian State vs. North Texas

| Team | 1 | 2 | 3 | 4 | Total |
|---|---|---|---|---|---|
| • Mountaineers | 14 | 21 | 7 | 14 | 56 |
| Mean Green | 0 | 14 | 7 | 7 | 28 |

- Date: December 21, 2020
- Location: Brooks Stadium
  Conway, SC
- Game start: 1:30 p.m. CST
- Elapsed time: 3 hours and 39 minutes
- Game attendance: 5,000
- Game weather: 55 °F (13 °C) • Weather: Clear • Wind: 6 MPH
- Referee: Luke Richmond
- TV announcers (ESPN): Courtney Lyle (play–by–play), Eric Mac Lain, (analyst), Marty Smith, and Ryan McGee (sideline reporters)

Scoring summary
| 1 | 10:54 | APP | Henry Pearson 22-yard pass from Malik Williams (Chandler Staton kick) (4 plays, 73 yards, 1:13) | APP 7–0 |
| 1 | 03:07 | APP | Camerun Peoples 3-yard rush (Chandler Staton kick) (12 plays, 90 yards, 5:05) | APP 14–0 |
| 2 | 13:41 | UNT | Loronzo Thompson 16-yard pass from Kason Martin (Ethan Mooney kick) (12 plays, 75 yards, 4:26) | APP 14–7 |
| 2 | 06:04 | APP | Henry Parson 11-yard pass from Zac Thomas (Chandler Staton kick) (5 plays, 59 yards, 1:48) | APP 21–7 |
| 2 | 02:29 | APP | Marcus Williams 70-yard rush (Chandler Staton kick) (1 play, 70 yards, 0:13) | APP 28–7 |
| 2 | 00:27 | UNT | Oscar Adaway III 4-yard rush (Ethan Mooney kick) (9 plays, 75 yards, 2:02) | APP 28–14 |
| 2 | 00:11 | APP | Camerun Peoples 64-yard rush (Chandler Staton kick) (1 play, 64 yards, 0:16) | APP 35–14 |
| 3 | 06:14 | UNT | Austin Ogunmakin 34-yard pass from Jason Bean (Ethan Mooney kick) (11 plays, 74 yards, 4:08) | APP 35–21 |
| 3 | 02:58 | APP | Camerun Peoples 62-yard rush (Chandler Staton kick) (1 play, 62 yards, 0:11) | APP 42–21 |
| 4 | 14:16 | APP | Camerun Peoples 1-yard rush (Chandler Staton kick) (4 plays, 79 yards, 1:19) | APP 49–21 |
| 4 | 09:03 | APP | Camerun Peoples 1-yard rush (Chandler Staton kick) (5 plays, 20 yards, 2:47) | APP 56–21 |
| 4 | 06:12 | UNT | Loronzo Thompson 7-yard pass from Jason Bean (Ethan Mooney kick) (9 plays, 75 yards, 2:51) | APP 56–28 |

| Statistics | Appalachian State | North Texas |
|---|---|---|
| First downs | 22 | 30 |
| Total yards | 636 | 497 |
| Rushing yards | 500 | 230 |
| Passing yards | 136 | 267 |
| Turnovers | 0 | 1 |
| Time of possession | 28:06 | 31:54 |

| Team | Category | Player | Statistics |
|---|---|---|---|
| Appalachian State | Passing | Zac Thomas | 8/16, 114 yards, 1 TD |
| Appalachian State | Rushing | Camerun Peoples | 22 carries, 317 yards, 5 TDs |
| Appalachian State | Receiving | Henry Pearson | 3 receptions, 47 yards, 2 TDs |
| North Texas | Passing | Jason Bean | 21/36, 251 yards, 2 TDs, 1 INT |
| North Texas | Rushing | Tre Siggers | 17 carries, 120 yards |
| North Texas | Receiving | Austin Ogunmakin | 7 receptions, 131 yards, 1 TD |

== Players drafted into the NFL ==
| Round | Pick | Player | Position | NFL Club |
|---|---|---|---|---|
| 4 | 129 | Jaelon Darden | WR | Tampa Bay Buccaneers |
