= 2018 Coastal Carolina Chanticleers football team =

American college football season

2018 Coastal Carolina Chanticleers football
- Conference: Sun Belt Conference
- East Division
- Record: 5–7 (2–6 Sun Belt)
- Head coach: Joe Moglia (6th season)
- Offensive coordinator: Jamey Chadwell (2nd season)
- Offensive scheme: Up-tempo spread
- Defensive coordinator: Marvin Sanders (1st season)
- Base defense: 4–3
- Home stadium: Brooks Stadium

2018 Sun Belt Conference football standings
	Conf.			Overall
Team	W		L	W		L
East Division
Appalachian State xy$	7	–	1	11	–	2
Troy x	7	–	1	10	–	3
Georgia Southern	6	–	2	10	–	3
Coastal Carolina	2	–	6	5	–	7
Georgia State	1	–	7	2	–	10
West Division
Louisiana xy	5	–	3	7	–	7
Arkansas State x	5	–	3	8	–	5
Louisiana–Monroe	4	–	4	6	–	6
South Alabama	2	–	6	3	–	9
Texas State	1	–	7	3	–	9
Championship: Appalachian State 30, Louisiana 19
$ – Conference champion; x – Division champion/co-champions; y – Championship game participant

The 2018 Coastal Carolina Chanticleers football team represented Coastal Carolina University s a member of the East Division of the Sun Belt Conference during the 2018 NCAA Division I FBS football season. Led by Joe Moglia in his sixth and final season as head coach, the Chanticleers compiled an overall record of 5–7 with a mark of 2–6 in conference play, placing fourth in the Sun Belt's East Division. Coastal Carolina played home games at Brooks Stadium in Conway, South Carolina.

== Preseason ==
=== Award watch lists ===
Listed in the order that they were released

Award	Player	Position	Year
Fred Biletnikoff Award	Malcolm Williams	WR	SR

=== Sun Belt coaches poll ===
On July 19, 2018, the Sun Belt released their preseason coaches poll with the Chanticleers predicted to finish in last place of the East Division.

=== Preseason All-Sun Belt Teams ===
The Chanticleers had one player selected to the preseason all-Sun Belt teams.

Defense

2nd team

Silas Kelly – LB

== Schedule ==
Date	Time	Opponent	Site	TV	Result	Attendance
September 1	12:00 p.m.	at South Carolina*	Williams–Brice Stadium; Columbia, SC	SECN	L 15–49	75,126
September 8	7:00 p.m.	UAB*	Brooks Stadium; Conway, SC	ESPN+	W 47–24	9,776
September 12 (Note: The game between Coastal Carolina and Campbell, originally scheduled to be a home game for Coastal Carolina, was relocated to Barker–Lane Stadium and moved to Wednesday September 12 due to Hurricane Florence.)	2:00 p.m.	at Campbell*	Barker–Lane Stadium; Buies Creek, NC	ESPN3	W 58–21	2,047
September 22	6:00 p.m.	at Louisiana	Cajun Field; Lafayette, LA	ESPN+	W 30–28	17,125
September 29	3:30 p.m.	at Troy	Veterans Memorial Stadium; Troy, AL	ESPN+	L 21–45	23,810
October 13	6:00 p.m.	Louisiana–Monroe	Brooks Stadium; Conway, SC	ESPN+	L 20–45	11,506
October 20	3:30 p.m.	at UMass*	McGuirk Stadium; Hadley, MA	ELVN	W 24–13	11,134
October 27	2:00 p.m.	at Georgia State	Georgia State Stadium; Atlanta, GA	ESPN+	W 37–34	15,648
November 3	5:00 p.m.	Appalachian State^{†}	Brooks Stadium; Conway, SC	ESPN+	L 7–23	13,004
November 10	5:00 p.m.	Arkansas State	Brooks Stadium; Conway, SC	ESPN+	L 16–44	8,141
November 17	5:00 p.m.	Georgia Southern	Brooks Stadium; Conway, SC	ESPN+	L 17–41	9,886
November 23	3:00 p.m.	at South Alabama	Ladd–Peebles Stadium; Mobile, AL	ESPN+	L 28–31	10,670
*Non-conference game; ^{†}Homecoming; All times are in Eastern time

== Game summaries ==
=== At South Carolina ===
	1	2	3	4	Total
Chanticleers	0	3	3	9	15
Gamecocks	14	14	14	7	49

=== UAB ===
	1	2	3	4	Total
Blazers	14	10	0	0	24
Chanticleers	7	13	7	20	47

=== At Campbell ===
	1	2	3	4	Total
Chanticleers	7	17	21	13	58
Fighting Camels	14	7	0	0	21

=== At Louisiana ===
	1	2	3	4	Total
Chanticleers	3	13	7	7	30
Ragin' Cajuns	7	0	14	7	28

=== At Troy ===
	1	2	3	4	Total
Chanticleers	0	14	7	0	21
Trojans	21	3	14	7	45

=== Louisiana–Monroe ===
Week Seven: Louisiana–Monroe Warhawks at Coastal Carolina Chanticleers – Game summary

Quarter	1	2	3	4	Total
Warhawks	14	10	7	14	45
Chanticleers	3	10	7	0	20

at Brooks Stadium • Conway, SC

- Date: October 13
- Game time: 5:00 p.m. CDT
- Game weather: 76° · Sunny; clear skies · SSE – 2 mph.
- Game attendance: 11,506
- Referee: Jeremy Parker
- TV: ESPN+

Game information

First quarter

- ULM - Austin Vaughn 4-yard TD run, Craig Ford kick good, 12:48 (ULM 7-0)
- ULM - Derrick Gore 10-yard TD run, Ford kick good, 8:35 (ULM 14-0)
- CCU - Massimo Biscardi 29-yard field goal, 1:07 (ULM 14-3)

Second quarter

- CCU - Malcolm Williams 4-yard TD run, Biscardi kick good, 9:10 (ULM 14-10)
- ULM - Marcus Green 37-yard TD pass from Caleb Evans, Ford kick good, 7:38 (ULM 21-10)
- ULM - Ford 20-yard field goal, 0:50 (ULM 24-10)
- CCU - Biscardi 40-yard field goal, 0:02 (ULM 24-13)

Third quarter

- CCU - Marcus Outlaw 6-yard TD run, Biscardi kick good, 6:56 (ULM 24-20)
- ULM - Evans 1-yard TD run, Ford kick good, 3:45 (ULM 31-20)

Fourth quarter

- ULM - Evans 20-yard TD run, Ford kick good, 4:07 (ULM 38-20)
- ULM - Gore 46-yard TD run, Ford kick good, 0:31 (ULM 45-20)

Leading Passers

- ULM - Caleb Evans - 16/22, 224 yards, TD
- CCU - Bryce Carpenter - 9/19, 133 yards, INT

Leading Rushers

- ULM - Derrick Gore - 16 carries, 147 yards, 2 TD
- CCU - Marcus Outlaw - 15 carries, 104 yards, TD

Leading Receivers

- ULM - Marcus Green - 5 receptions, 111 yards, TD
- CCU - Malcolm Williams - 4 receptions, 87 yards

=== At UMass ===
	1	2	3	4	Total
Chanticleers	3	0	14	7	24
Minutemen	3	3	7	0	13

=== At Georgia State ===
	1	2	3	4	Total
Chanticleers	17	3	7	10	37
Panthers	7	6	21	0	34

=== Appalachian State ===
	1	2	3	4	Total
Mountaineers	7	7	0	9	23
Chanticleers	7	0	0	0	7

=== Arkansas State ===
	1	2	3	4	Total
Red Wolves	14	13	14	3	44
Chanticleers	0	6	7	3	16

=== Georgia Southern ===
	1	2	3	4	Total
Eagles	3	10	21	7	41
Chanticleers	7	3	0	7	17

=== At South Alabama ===
	1	2	3	4	Total
Chanticleers	0	7	7	14	28
Jaguars	10	14	7	0	31
