= 2018 Louisiana–Monroe Warhawks football team =

American college football season

2018 Louisiana–Monroe Warhawks football
- Conference: Sun Belt Conference
- West Division
- Record: 6–6 (4–4 Sun Belt)
- Head coach: Matt Viator (3rd season)
- Offensive coordinator: Matt Kubik (3rd season)
- Offensive scheme: Multiple
- Defensive coordinator: Mike Collins (3rd season)
- Base defense: 4–2–5
- Home stadium: Malone Stadium

2018 Sun Belt Conference football standings
	Conf.			Overall
Team	W		L	W		L
East Division
Appalachian State xy$	7	–	1	11	–	2
Troy x	7	–	1	10	–	3
Georgia Southern	6	–	2	10	–	3
Coastal Carolina	2	–	6	5	–	7
Georgia State	1	–	7	2	–	10
West Division
Louisiana xy	5	–	3	7	–	7
Arkansas State x	5	–	3	8	–	5
Louisiana–Monroe	4	–	4	6	–	6
South Alabama	2	–	6	3	–	9
Texas State	1	–	7	3	–	9
Championship: Appalachian State 30, Louisiana 19
$ – Conference champion; x – Division champion/co-champions; y – Championship game participant

The 2018 Louisiana–Monroe Warhawks football team represented the University of Louisiana at Monroe in the 2018 NCAA Division I FBS football season. The Warhawks played their home games at Malone Stadium in Monroe, Louisiana, and competed in the West Division of the Sun Belt Conference. They were led by third-year head coach Matt Viator. They finished the regular season 6–6, 4–4 in Sun Belt play to finish in third place in the West Division. Despite being bowl eligible, they were not invited to a bowl game.

== Preseason ==
=== Award watch lists ===
Listed in the order that they were released

Award	Player	Position	Year
Maxwell Award	Caleb Evans	QB	JR
Fred Biletnikoff Award	Marcus Green	WR	SR
John Mackey Award	Josh Pederson	TE	SO
Paul Hornung Award	Marcus Green	WR/KR	JR
Manning Award	Caleb Evans	QB	JR
Earl Campbell Tyler Rose Award	Caleb Evans	QB	JR

=== Sun Belt coaches poll ===
On July 19, 2018, the Sun Belt released their preseason coaches poll with the Warhawks predicted to finish in second place in the West Division.

=== Preseason All-Sun Belt Teams ===
The Warhawks had three players at four positions selected to the preseason all-Sun Belt teams.

Offense

1st team

Marcus Green – WR

2nd team

Caleb Evans – QB

RJ Turner – WR

Special teams

1st team

Marcus Green – KR

== Roster ==
2018 Louisiana–Monroe Warhawks football team roster
Players
Coaches
Offense

Pos.	#	Name	Class
WR	2	RJ Turner	Jr
WR	3	Marcus Green	Sr
WR	4	Brandius Batiste	So
QB	6	Caleb Evans	Jr
QB	7	Zachari Jackson	Fr
QB	8	JT Jackson	Jr
WR	10	D'Marius Gillespie	Sr
QB	11	Matt Gardner	So
WR	12	Markis McCray	Sr
QB	13	Brennen Wooten	So
WR	14	Perry Carter Jr.	Fr
QB	16	Colby Suits	Fr
WR	17	Xavier Brown	Sr
WR	18	Jonathan Hodoh	Jr
RB	22	Javin Myers	Fr
RB	22	Isaiah Philips	Fr
RB	25	Kayin White	So
WR	30	Stephen Colvin	Jr
WR	30	Darius Rodrigue	So
RB	33	Austin Vaughn	Jr
WR	37	Deuce Caston	So
RB	44	Derrick Gore	Sr
OL	51	Zach Breaux	Fr
OL	56	Bobby Reynolds	Jr
OL	59	Colton Grove	Jr
OL	64	Eastwood Thomas	Jr
OL	65	Dakota Torbert	Fr
OL	66	Ben Moye	Jr
OL	68	T.J. Fiailoa	So
OL	70	Blake Lodes	Fr
OL	72	Samuel Williams	So
OL	73	Devin Jackson Jr.	Jr
OL	74	Joq Savage	Fr
OL	76	Conner Parsons	Fr
OT	77	Trace Ellison	Jr
OL	78	Brandon Jones	Jr
WR	80	Malik Jackson	Fr
WR	81	CJ Fletcher	Fr
WR	81	Josh Newton	Fr
TE	82	Sloan Spiller	Sr
WR	84	Jahquan Bloomfield	Fr
TE	85	Reagan Heddins	Jr
TE	86	Josh Pederson	So
TE	88	Tyler Lamm	So

Defense

Pos.	#	Name	Class
S	1	Tyler Glass	Jr
S	2	Cal Lee III	Jr
S	3	Collin Turner	Sr
LB	4	Rashaad Harding	So
S	6	Wesley Thompson	Sr
LB	7	Cortez Sisco Jr.	Jr
CB	9	Marcus Hubbard	Sr
CB	12	Jarell Brown	Sr
CB	12	Rhoy Williams	Sr
LB	14	David Griffith	Sr
S	15	Austin Hawley	So
CB	19	Tajhnick Bishop	Fr
CB	20	Kendrick Marbles	So
CB	21	Corey Straughter	So
S	23	Nick Ingram	Jr
S	24	Jabari Johnson	Fr
CB	26	Floyd Connell	Fr
CB	27	Jordan Oliver	Fr
S	28	Kevin Jones	Fr
S	29	Logan Latin	So
S	30	Bacari Middleton	Fr
LB	32	Chase Day	Jr
S	34	Luke Hendrick	Jr
LB	35	Keyshawn Johnson	Fr
DB	36	Dylan Claiborne	So
S	37	Traveion Webster	So
S	38	Travis Gary	So
S	38	Korian Reynaud	Jr
CB	41	Semaj Franklin	So
LB	42	Hunter Smith	Fr
CB	43	Jared Doyle	So
DE	44	Ty Shelby	So
DL	45	Shaquille Warren	Sr
DL	48	Larance Shaw	Jr
DE	49	Barry Howard Jr.	Jr
LB	52	Tralon Thomas	Fr
LB	53	Re'Lik Wilson	So
LB	54	Lee Marshall	Sr
LB	55	Re'Naz Wilson	So
DL	58	Donald Louis Jr.	Jr
DT	90	Jaylen Veasley	Jr
DE	91	Brandon Nettles	Fr
DT	93	Mason Husmann	So
DT	94	Tyler Johnson	Sr
DE	95	Myles Cole	Fr
DT	96	Dayonte Roberts	Fr
DE	97	Kerry Starks	So
DE	98	Sam Miller	Jr
DT	99	Derion Ford	Sr

Special teams

Pos.	#	Name	Class
K	16	Craig Ford	Sr
P	39	Mark Deaves	Fr
K	47	Craig Walker	Fr
LS	59	Andy Becker	Fr
LS	74	Walker Easton	Jr
K	83	Matt Wylie	Sr
K	87	David Heaton	Fr

Head coach

- Matt Viator (McNeese State)

Coordinators/assistant coaches

- Mike Collins (Northeast Louisiana)
  Defensive coordinator
- Matt Kubik (Louisiana Tech)
  Offensive coordinator, quarterbacks
- Kyle Segler (Sam Houston State)
  Special teams coordinator, tight ends
- John Carr (Louisiana Tech)
  Wide receivers, recruiting coordinator
- Eman Naghavi (McNeese State)
  Offensive line
- Alan Richard (Northeast Louisiana)
  Running backs
- Scott Stoker (Northwestern State)
  Linebackers
- Anthony Camp (McNeese State)
  Defensive line
- Perry Carter (Southern Miss)
  Defensive backs
- Bakari Guice (Grambling State)
  Safeties

Legend

- (C) Team captain
- (S) Suspended
- (I) Ineligible
- Injured
- Redshirt

Roster
Last update: April 25, 2019

== Schedule ==
The Warhawks hosted one of their four non-conference opponents, Southeastern Louisiana from the Southland Conference, and traveled to Southern Miss from Conference USA, Texas A&M from the Southeastern Conference and Ole Miss from the Southeastern Conference.

Date	Time	Opponent	Site	TV	Result	Attendance
August 30	7:00 p.m.	Southeastern Louisiana*	Malone Stadium; Monroe, LA	ESPN+	W 34–31	10,137
September 8	6:00 p.m.	at Southern Miss*	M. M. Roberts Stadium; Hattiesburg, MS	ESPN3	W 21–20	19,579
September 15	6:30 p.m.	at Texas A&M*	Kyle Field; College Station, TX	SECN	L 10–48	96,727
September 22	6:00 p.m.	Troy	Malone Stadium; Monroe, LA	ESPN+	L 27–35	15,722
September 29	1:00 p.m.	at Georgia State	Georgia State Stadium; Atlanta, GA	ESPN+	L 14–46	14,368
October 6	3:00 p.m.	at Ole Miss*	Vaught–Hemingway Stadium; Oxford, MS	SECN	L 21–70	52,875
October 13	5:00 p.m.	at Coastal Carolina	Brooks Stadium; Conway, SC	ESPN+	W 45–20	11,506
October 20	6:00 p.m.	Texas State^{†}	Malone Stadium; Monroe, LA	ESPN3	W 20–14	13,235
November 3	2:00 p.m.	Georgia Southern	Malone Stadium; Monroe, LA	ESPN3	W 44–25	13,787
November 10	4:00 p.m.	at South Alabama	Ladd–Peebles Stadium; Mobile, AL	ESPN+	W 38–10	14,096
November 17	2:00 p.m.	at Arkansas State	Centennial Bank Stadium; Jonesboro, AR	ESPN+	L 17–31	20,012
November 24	2:00 p.m.	Louisiana	Malone Stadium; Monroe, LA (Battle on the Bayou)	ESPN+	L 28–31	18,167
*Non-conference game; ^{†}Homecoming; Rankings from AP Poll released prior to the game; All times are in Central time

Schedule source:

== Game summaries ==
=== Southeastern Louisiana ===
Week One: Southeastern Louisiana Lions at Louisiana–Monroe Warhawks – Game summary

Quarter	1	2	3	4	Total
Lions	14	7	0	10	31
Warhawks	7	9	10	8	34

at Malone Stadium • Monroe, LA

- Date: September 1
- Game time: 7:00 p.m. CDT
- Game weather: 91° · Wind – SW 3 · Partly Cloudy
- Game attendance: 10,137
- Referee: Jason Autrey
- TV: ESPN+

Game information

First quarter

- ULM - Derrick Gore 2-yard TD run, Craig Ford kick good, 9:41 (ULM 7-0)
- SELA - Austin Mitchell 9-yard TD pass from Chason Virgil, Jonathan Tatum kick good, 5:16 (TIE 7-7)
- SELA - Lorenzo Nunez 17-yard TD pass from Virgil, Tatum kick good, 3:40 (SELA 14-7)

Second quarter

- ULM - Ford 22-yard field goal, 13:02 (SELA 14-10)
- ULM - Marcus Green 3-yard TD pass from Caleb Evans, Ford kick no good, 7:21 (ULM 16-14)
- SELA - Juwan Petit-Frere 59-yard TD pass from Virgil, Tatum kick good, 5:56 (SELA 21-16)

Third quarter

- ULM - Green 79-yard TD pass from Evans, Ford kick good, 12:56 (ULM 23-21)
- ULM - Ford 28-yard field goal, 1:21 (ULM 26-21)

Fourth quarter

- SELA - Tatum 34-yard field goal, 14:55 (ULM 26-24)
- SELA - Petit-Frere 34-yard TD pass from Virgil, Tatum kick good, 8:23 (SELA 31-26)
- ULM - Evans 11-yard TD run, Evans two-point conversion run good, 0:37 (ULM 34-31)

Leading Passers

- ULM - Caleb Evans - 35/53, 346 yards, 2 TD, INT
- SELA - Chason Virgil - 28/39, 358 yards, 4 TD, INT

Leading Rushers

- ULM - Derrick Gore - 21 carries, 104 yards, TD
- SELA - Devonte Williams - 6 carries, 27 yards

Leading Receivers

- ULM - Marcus Green - 7 receptions, 99 yards, 2 TD
- SELA - Juwan Petit-Frere - 5 receptions, 148 yards, 2 TD

=== At Southern Miss ===
Week Two: Louisiana–Monroe Warhawks at Southern Miss Golden Eagles – Game summary

Quarter	1	2	3	4	Total
Warhawks	14	0	7	0	21
Golden Eagles	10	7	3	0	20

at M. M. Roberts Stadium • Hattiesburg, MS

- Date: September 8
- Game time: 6:00 p.m. CDT
- Game weather: 87° · Partly Cloudy · SSW – 7 mph.
- Game attendance: 19,579
- Referee: Marshall Lewis
- TV: ESPN3

Game information

First quarter

- USM - Jaylond Adams 75-yard TD pass from Jack Abraham, Parker Shaunfield kick good, 14:47 (USM 7-0)
- ULM - Sam Miller 0-yard fumble return for TD, Craig Ford kick good, 12:05 (TIE 7-7)
- ULM - Marcus Green 49-yard TD pass from Caleb Evans, Ford kick good, 4:37 (ULM 14-7)
- USM - Shaunfield 42-yard field goal, 2:01 (ULM 14-10)

Second quarter

- USM - Quez Watkins 5-yard TD pass from Abraham, Shaunfield kick good, 6:36 (USM 14-17)

Third quarter

- ULM - Green 4-yard TD pass from Evans, Ford kick good, 14:03 (ULM 21-17)
- USM - Shaunfield 47-yard field goal, 6:51 (ULM 21-20)

Leading Passers

- ULM - Caleb Evans - 15/28, 195 yards, 2 TD, INT
- USM - Jack Abraham - 31/46, 378 yards, 2 TD, 2 INT

Leading Rushers

- ULM - Austin Vaughn - 9 carries, 85 yards
- USM - Tez Parks - 17 carries, 42 yards

Leading Receivers

- ULM - Marcus Green - 4 receptions, 96 yards, 2 TD
- USM - Jaylond Adams - 9 receptions, 158 yards, TD

=== At Texas A&M ===
Week Three: Louisiana–Monroe Warhawks at Texas A&M Aggies – Game summary

Quarter	1	2	3	4	Total
Warhawks	3	7	0	0	10
Aggies	7	17	10	14	48

at Kyle Field • College Station, TX

- Date: September 15
- Game time: 6:30 p.m. CDT
- Game weather: 86° · Partly Cloudy · SSW – 10 mph.
- Game attendance: 96,727
- Referee: Matt Austin
- TV announcers (SECN): Tom Hart (play-by-play), Jordan Rodgers (analyst), Cole Cubelic (sidelines)

Game information

First quarter

- TAMU - Trayveon Williams 2-yard TD run, Seth Small kick good, 8:56 (TAMU 7-0)
- ULM - Craig Ford 27-yard field goal, 1:08 (TAMU 7-3)

Second quarter

- TAMU - Kellen Mond 7-yard TD run, Small kick good, 10:17 (TAMU 14-3)
- TAMU - Small 40-yard field goal, 5:33 (TAMU 17-3)
- TAMU - Tyrel Dodson 78-yard blocked field goal returned for TD, Small kick good, 1:21 (TAMU 24-3)
- ULM - R. J. Turner 2-yard TD pass from Caleb Evans, Ford kick good, 0:04 (TAMU 24-10)

Third quarter

- TAMU - Mond 9-yard TD run, Ford kick good, 6:05 (TAMM 31-10)
- TAMU - Small 36-yard field goal, 0:11 (TAMU 34-10)

Fourth quarter

- TAMU - Jace Sternberger 20-yard TD pass from Mond, Small kick good, 8:05 (TAMU 41-10)
- TAMU - Jashuan Corbin 2-yard TD run, Small kick good, 0:39 (TAMU 48-10)

Leading Passers

- TAMU - Kellen Mond - 16/24, 210 yards, TD
- ULM - Caleb Evans - 15/28, 225 yards, TD, INT

Leading Rushers

- TAMU - Trayveon Williams - 22 carries, 128 yards, TD
- ULM - Austin Vaughn - 8 carries, 33 yards

Leading Receivers

- TAMU - Jhamon Ausbon - 4 receptions, 59 yards
- ULM - Marcus Green - 4 receptions, 75 yards

=== Troy ===
Week Four: Troy Trojans at Louisiana–Monroe Warhawks – Game summary

Quarter	1	2	3	4	Total
Trojans	7	28	0	0	35
Warhawks	7	0	7	13	27

at Malone Stadium • Monroe, LA

- Date: September 22
- Game time: 6:00 p.m. CDT
- Game weather: 75° · Cloudy; light rain · ENE – 3 mph.
- Game attendance: 15,722
- Referee: Kyle Olson
- TV: ESPN+

Game information

First quarter

- ULM - Derrick Gore 1-yard TD run, Craig Ford kick good, 8:32 (ULM 7-0)
- TROY - Kaleb Barker 19-yard TD run, Tyler Sumpter kick good, 7:00 (TIE 7-7)

Second quarter

- TROY - Barker 2-yard TD run, Sumpter kick good, 13:51 (TROY 14-7)
- TROY - Damion Willis 26-yard TD pass from Sawyer Smith, Sumpter kick good, 10:23 (TROY 21-7)
- TROY - Willis 4-yard TD pass from Barker, Sumpter kick good, 2:20 (TROY 28-7)
- TROY - Sidney Davis 22-yard TD pass from Barker, Sumpter kick good, 0:42 (TROY 35-7)

Third quarter

- ULM - Kayin White 2-yard TD run, Ford kick good, 5:17 (TROY 35-14)

Fourth quarter

- ULM - Slaon Spiller 4-yard TD pass from Caleb Evans, Ford kick good, 14:22 (TROY 35-21)
- ULM - Josh Pederson 23-yard TD pass from Evan, Ford kick no good, 6:18 (TROY 35-27)

Leading Passers

- TROY - Kaleb Barker - 23/28, 273 yards, 2 TD
- ULM - Caleb Evans - 29/48, 290 yards, 2 TD, INT

Leading Rushers

- TROY - B. J. Smith - 16 carries, 63 yards
- ULM - Caleb Evans - 15 carries, 101 yards

Leading Receivers

- TROY - Sloan Davis - 6 receptions, 78 yards, TD
- ULM - Xavier Brown - 2 receptions, 59 yards

=== At Georgia State ===
Week Five: Louisiana–Monroe Warhawks at Georgia State Panthers – Game summary

Quarter	1	2	3	4	Total
Warhawks	7	7	0	0	14
Panthers	14	16	6	10	46

at Georgia State Stadium • Atlanta, GA

- Date: September 29
- Game time: 1:00 p.m. CDT
- Game weather: 83° · Partly Sunny · WNW – 5 mph.
- Game attendance: 14,368
- Referee: Ted Pitts
- TV: ESPN+

Game information

First quarter

- GSU - Dan Ellington 1-yard TD run, Brandon Wright kick good, 11:55 (GSU 7-0)
- GSU - Tra Barnett 23-yard TD run, Wright kick good, 7:18 (GSU 14-0)
- ULM - Caleb Evans 21-yard TD run, Craig Ford kick good, 4:26 (GSU 14-7)

Second quarter

- GSU - Roger Carter 4-yard TD pass from Ellington, Wright kick no good, 13:00 (GSU 20-7)
- GSU - Seth Paige 82-yard TD run, Wright kick good, 11:48 (GSU 27-7)
- ULM - Evans 12-yard TD run, Ford kick good, 9:34 (GSU 27-14)
- GSU - Wright 42-yard field goal, 1:51 (GSU 30-14)

Third quarter

- GSU - Paige 1-yard TD run, Wright kick no good, 6:19 (GSU 36-14)

Fourth quarter

- GSU - Wright 35-yard field goal, 14:13 (GSU 39-14)
- GSU - Penny Hart 49-yard punt returned for TD, Wright kick good, 12:36 (GSU 46-14)

Leading Passers

- GSU - Dan Ellington - 15/18, 179 yards, TD
- ULM - Caleb Evans - 19/32, 136 yards, 2 INT

Leading Rushers

- GSU - Seth Paige - 9 carries, 145 yards, 2 TD
- ULM - Kayn White - carry, 46 yards

Leading Receivers

- GSU - Sam Pinckney - 2 receptions, 74 yards
- ULM - Marcus Green - 2 receptions, 33 yards

=== At Ole Miss ===
Week Six: Louisiana–Monroe Warhawks at Ole Miss Rebels – Game summary

Quarter	1	2	3	4	Total
Warhawks	0	7	7	7	21
Rebels	21	28	14	7	70

at Vaught–Hemingway Stadium • Oxford, MS

- Date: October 6
- Game time: 3:00 p.m. CDT
- Game weather: 87° · Sunny
- Game attendance: 52,875
- Referee: Steve Marlowe
- TV announcers (SECN): Dave Neal, D. J. Shockley

Game information

First quarter

- MISS - Scottie Phillips 2-yard TD run, Luke Logan kick good, 10:58 (MISS 7-0)
- MISS - A. J. Brown 20-yard TD pass from Jordan Ta'amu, Logan kick good, 7:49 (MISS 14-0)
- MISS - Ta'amu 1-yard TD run, Logan kick good, 1:18 (MISS 21-0)

Second quarter

- MISS - Ta'amu 39-yard TD run, Logan kick good, 12:13 (MISS 28-0)
- ULM - Derrick Gore 11-yard TD run, Craig Ford kick good, 9:35 (MISS 28-7)
- MISS - Phillips 1-yard TD run, Logan kick good, 7:07 (MISS 35-7)
- MISS - D. K. Metcalf 62-yard TD pass from Ta'amu, Logan kick good, 1:43 (MISS 42-7)
- MISS - DaMarkus Lodge 16-yard TD pass from Ta'amu, Logan kick good, 0:04 (MISS 49-7)

Third quarter

- MISS - Phillips 11-yard TD pass from Matt Corral, Logan kick good, 13:51 (MISS 56-7)
- MISS - Corral 62-yard TD run, Logan kick good, 10:04 (MISS 63-7)
- ULM - Marcus Green 71-yard punt returned for TD, Ford kick good, 4:59 (MISS 63-14)

Fourth quarter

- MISS - Elijah Moore 24-yard TD pass from Corral, Logan kick good, 12:38 (MISS 70-14)
- ULM - Zachari Jackson 8-yard TD pass from Colby Suits, Ford kick good, 1:25 (MISS 70-21)

Leading Passers

- MISS - Jordan Ta'amu - 21/24, 374 yards, 3 TD
- ULM - Caleb Evans - 17/28, 206 yards

Leading Rushers

- MISS - Matt Corral - 6 carries, 78 yards, TD
- ULM - Derrick Gore - 10 carries, 52 yards, TD

Leading Receivers

- MISS - DaMarkus Lodge - 9 receptions, 179 yards, TD
- ULM - R. J. Turner - 5 receptions, 112 yards

=== At Coastal Carolina ===
Week Seven: Louisiana–Monroe Warhawks at Coastal Carolina Chanticleers – Game summary

Quarter	1	2	3	4	Total
Warhawks	14	10	7	14	45
Chanticleers	3	10	7	0	20

at Brooks Stadium • Conway, SC

- Date: October 13
- Game time: 5:00 p.m. CDT
- Game weather: 76° · Sunny; clear skies · SSE – 2 mph.
- Game attendance: 11,506
- Referee: Jeremy Parker
- TV: ESPN+

Game information

First quarter

- ULM - Austin Vaughn 4-yard TD run, Craig Ford kick good, 12:48 (ULM 7-0)
- ULM - Derrick Gore 10-yard TD run, Ford kick good, 8:35 (ULM 14-0)
- CCU - Massimo Biscardi 29-yard field goal, 1:07 (ULM 14-3)

Second quarter

- CCU - Malcolm Williams 4-yard TD run, Biscardi kick good, 9:10 (ULM 14-10)
- ULM - Marcus Green 37-yard TD pass from Caleb Evans, Ford kick good, 7:38 (ULM 21-10)
- ULM - Ford 20-yard field goal, 0:50 (ULM 24-10)
- CCU - Biscardi 40-yard field goal, 0:02 (ULM 24-13)

Third quarter

- CCU - Marcus Outlaw 6-yard TD run, Biscardi kick good, 6:56 (ULM 24-20)
- ULM - Evans 1-yard TD run, Ford kick good, 3:45 (ULM 31-20)

Fourth quarter

- ULM - Evans 20-yard TD run, Ford kick good, 4:07 (ULM 38-20)
- ULM - Gore 46-yard TD run, Ford kick good, 0:31 (ULM 45-20)

Leading Passers

- ULM - Caleb Evans - 16/22, 224 yards, TD
- CCU - Bryce Carpenter - 9/19, 133 yards, INT

Leading Rushers

- ULM - Derrick Gore - 16 carries, 147 yards, 2 TD
- CCU - Marcus Outlaw - 15 carries, 104 yards, TD

Leading Receivers

- ULM - Marcus Green - 5 receptions, 111 yards, TD
- CCU - Malcolm Williams - 4 receptions, 87 yards

=== Texas State ===
Week Eight: Texas State Bobcats at Louisiana–Monroe Warhawks – Game summary

Quarter	1	2	3	4	Total
Bobcats	7	0	0	7	14
Warhawks	7	10	3	0	20

at Malone Stadium • Monroe, LA

- Date: October 20
- Game time: 6:00 p.m. CDT
- Game weather: 65° · Partly Cloudy · N – 12 mph.
- Game attendance: 13,235
- Referee: Marshall Lewis
- TV: ESPN3

Game information

First quarter

- TXST - Tyler Vitt 7-yard TD run, Clayton Stewart kick good, 8:38 (TXST 7-0)
- ULM - Austin Vaughn 2-yard TD run, Craig Ford kick good, 6:47 (TIE 7-7)

Second quarter

- ULM - Ford 43-yard field goal, 11:10 (ULM 10-7)
- ULM - Brandius Batiste 27-yard TD pass from Caleb Evans, Ford kick good, 4:41 (ULM 17-7)

Third quarter

- ULM - Ford 30-yard field goal, 0:44 (ULM 20-7)

Fourth quarter

- TXST - Robert Brown Jr., 4-yard TD run, Stewart kick good, 7:18 (ULM 20-14)

Leading Passers

- ULM - Caleb Evans - 13/29, 124 yards, TD
- TXST - Tyler Vitt - 15/25, 115 yards

Leading Rushers

- ULM - Caleb Evans - 14 carries, 85 yards
- TXST - Robert Brown Jr. - 10 carries, 46 yards, TD

Leading Receivers

- ULM - Marcus Green - 3 receptions, 36 yards
- TXST - Keenen Brown - 4 receptions, 50 yards

=== Georgia Southern ===
Week Ten: Georgia Southern Eagles at Louisiana–Monroe Warhawks – Game summary

Quarter	1	2	3	4	Total
Eagles	0	10	8	7	25
Warhawks	13	14	14	3	44

at Malone Stadium • Monroe, LA

- Date: November 3
- Game time: 2:00 p.m. CDT
- Game weather: 74° · Sunny · SW – 11 mph.
- Game attendance: 13,787
- Referee: Jeremy Parker
- TV: ESPN3

Game information

First quarter

- ULM - Caleb Evans 5-yard TD run, Craig Ford kick no good, 12:26 (ULM 6-0)
- ULM - Marcus Green 80-yard TD pass from Evans, Ford kick good, 6:43 (ULM 13-0)

Second quarter

- ULM - Green 69-yard TD pass from Evans, Ford kick good, 13:58 (ULM 20-0)
- GASO - Tyler Bass 38-yard field goal, 5:40 (ULM 20-3)
- ULM - Josh Johnson 1-yard TD run, Ford kick good, 2:49 (ULM 27-3)
- GASO - Mark Michaud 22-yard TD pass from Shai Werts, Bass kick good, 1:02 (ULM 27-10)

Third quarter

- ULM - Derrick Gore 1-yard TD run, Ford kick good, 6:31 (ULM 34-10)
- GASO - Jessie Liptrot 57-yard interception returned for TD, Wesley Field two-point conversion run good, 3:15 (ULM 34-18)
- ULM - Evans 2-yard TD run, Ford kick good, 0:14 (ULM 41-18)

Fourth quarter

- GASO - Benz Josue 5-yard returned block punt for TD, Bass kick good, 10:37 (ULM 41-25)
- ULM - Ford 32-yard field goal, 4:16 (ULM 44-25)

Leading Passers

- ULM - Caleb Evans - 13/22, 337 yards, 2 TD, 2 INT
- GASO - Shai Werts - 8/15, 78 yards, TD

Leading Rushers

- ULM - Derrick Gore - 19 carries, 114 yards, TD
- GASO - Wesley Fields - 17 carries, 73 yards

Leading Receivers

- ULM - Marcus Green - 2 receptions, 149 yards, 2 TD
- GASO - Davarius Bargnare - 3 receptions, 23 yards

=== At South Alabama ===
Week Eleven: Louisiana–Monroe Warhawks at South Alabama Jaguars – Game summary

Quarter	1	2	3	4	Total
Warhawks	10	14	14	0	38
Jaguars	7	3	0	0	10

at Ladd–Peebles Stadium • Mobile, AL

- Date: November 10
- Game time: 4:00 p.m. CST
- Game weather: 74° · Sunny · SW – 11 mph.
- Game attendance: 14,096
- Referee: Jason Autrey
- TV: ESPN+

Game information

First quarter

- USA - Jordan McCray 34-yard TD pass from Cephus Johnson, Gavin Patterson kick good, 10:58 (USA 7-0)
- ULM - Craig Ford 21-yard field goal, 7:27 (USA 7-3)
- ULM - Caleb Evans 4-yard TD run, Ford kick good, 0:36 (ULM 10-7)

Second quarter

- USA - Gavin Patterson 31-yard field goal, 9:34 (TIE 10-10)
- ULM - Jonathan Hodoh 29-yard TD pass from Evans, Ford kick good, 6:24 (ULM 17-10)
- ULM - D'Marius Gillespie 5-yard TD pass from Evans, Ford kick good, 0:22 (ULM 24-10)

Third quarter

- ULM - Marcus Green 10-yard TD run, Ford kick good, 12:34 (ULM 31-10)
- ULM - Evans 15-yard TD run, Ford kick good, 5:50 (ULM 38-10)

Leading Passers

- ULM - Caleb Evans - 27/32, 367 yards, 2 TD
- USA - Cole Garvin - 13/19, 95 yards

Leading Rushers

- ULM - Marcus Green - 2 carries, 68 yards, TD
- USA - Tra Minter - 12 carries, 61 yards

Leading Receivers

- ULM - D'Marcus Gillespie - 7 receptions, 159 yards, TD
- USA - Jordan McCray - 3 receptions, 45 yards, TD

=== At Arkansas State ===
Week Twelve: Louisiana–Monroe Warhawks at Arkansas State Red Wolves – Game summary

Quarter	1	2	3	4	Total
Warhawks	0	7	10	0	17
Red Wolves	7	10	14	0	31

at Centennial Bank Stadium • Jonesboro, Arkansas

- Date: November 17
- Game time: 2:00 p.m. CST
- Game weather: 66° · Sunny · S – 9 mph.
- Game attendance: 20,012
- Referee: Jeremy Parker
- TV: ESPN+

Game information

First quarter

- ARST - Kirk Merritt 49-yard TD pass from Justice Hansen, Blake Grupe kick good, 4:41 (ARST 7-0)

Second quarter

- ARST - Blake Grupe 26-yard field goal, 7:58 (ARST 10-0)
- ULM - Josh Pederson 34-yard TD pass from Caleb Evans, Craig Ford kick good, 5:25 (ARST 10-7)
- ARST - Merritt 7-yard TD pass from Hansen, Blake Grupe kick good, 0:31 (ARST 17-7)

Third quarter

- ARST - Justin Clifton 43-yard interception returned for TD, Blake Grupe kick good, 11:58 (ARST 24-7)
- ULM - Caleb Evans 1-yard TD run, Craig Ford kick good, 9:31 (ARST 24-14)
- ULM - Craig Ford 37-yard field goal, 5:23 (ARST 24-17)
- ARST - Justin McInnis 10-yard TD pass from Hansen, Blake Grupe kick good, 0:40 (ARST 31-17)

Leading Passers

- ARST - Justice Hansen - 21/27, 246 yards, 3 TD
- ULM - Caleb Evans - 17/28, 218 yards, TD, 3 INT

Leading Rushers

- ARST - Marcel Murray - 17 carries, 94 yards
- ULM - Caleb Evans - 14 carries, 34 yards, TD

Leading Receivers

- ARST - Kirk Merritt - 6 receptions, 89 yards, 3 TD
- ULM - Marcus Green - 5 receptions, 69 yards

=== Louisiana ===
Week Thirteen: Louisiana Ragin' Cajuns at Louisiana–Monroe Warhawks–Battle on the Bayou – Game summary

Quarter	1	2	3	4	Total
Ragin' Cajuns	14	10	0	7	31
Warhawks	0	21	0	7	28

at Malone Stadium • Monroe, LA

- Date: November 24
- Game time: 2:00 p.m. CST
- Game weather: 67° · Partly Cloudy · SSE – 6 mph.
- Game attendance: 18,167
- Referee: Ted Pitts
- TV: ESPN+

Game information

First quarter

- LA - Ryheem Malone 40-yard TD pass from Andre Nunez, Kyle Pfau kick good, 13:32 (LA 7-0)
- LA - Ja'Marcus Bradley 20-yard TD pass from Nunez, Pfau kick good, 4:41 (LA 14-0)

Second quarter

- ULM - Austin Vaughn 13-yard TD pass from Caleb Evans, Craig Ford kick good, 14:25 (LA 14-7)
- LA - Trey Ragas 6-yard TD pass from Nunez, Pfau kick good, 11:40 (LA 21-7)
- ULM - Kayin White 5-yard TD run, Ford kick good, 9:14 (LA 21-14)
- LA - Pfau 37-yard field goal, 4:22 (LA 24-14)
- ULM - Corey Straughter 66-yard interception returned for TD, Ford kick good, 2:25 (LA 24-21)

Third quarter

- LA - Elijah Mitchell 40-yard TD pass from Levi Lewis, Pfau kick good, 11:49 (LA 31-21)
- ULM - Marcus Green 30-yard TD pass from Caleb Evans, Ford kick good, 4:47 (LA 31-28)

Fourth quarter

Leading Passers

- LA - Andre Nunez - 11/15, 148 yards, 3 TD, INT
- ULM - Caleb Evans - 15/24, 201 yards, 2 TD, INT

Leading Rushers

- LA - Trey Ragas - 23 carries, 115 yards
- ULM - Derrick Gore - 11 carries, 79 yards

Leading Receivers

- LA - Ryheem Malone - 6 receptions, 91 yards, TD
- ULM - Marcus Green - 6 receptions, 76 yards, TD

== Players drafted into the NFL ==
Round	Pick	Player	Position	NFL Club
6	203	Marcus Green	RB	Atlanta Falcons
