= 2018 Texas State Bobcats football team =

American college football season

2018 Texas State Bobcats football
- Conference: Sun Belt Conference
- West Division
- Record: 3–9 (1–7 Sun Belt)
- Head coach: Everett Withers (3rd season; first 11 games); Chris Woods (interim; final game)
- Offensive coordinator: Zak Kuhr (2nd season)
- Offensive scheme: Spread
- Defensive coordinator: Chris Woods (1st season)
- Base defense: 3–4
- Home stadium: Bobcat Stadium

2018 Sun Belt Conference football standings
	Conf.			Overall
Team	W		L	W		L
East Division
Appalachian State xy$	7	–	1	11	–	2
Troy x	7	–	1	10	–	3
Georgia Southern	6	–	2	10	–	3
Coastal Carolina	2	–	6	5	–	7
Georgia State	1	–	7	2	–	10
West Division
Louisiana xy	5	–	3	7	–	7
Arkansas State x	5	–	3	8	–	5
Louisiana–Monroe	4	–	4	6	–	6
South Alabama	2	–	6	3	–	9
Texas State	1	–	7	3	–	9
Championship: Appalachian State 30, Louisiana 19
$ – Conference champion; x – Division champion/co-champions; y – Championship game participant

The 2018 Texas State Bobcats football team represented Texas State University in the 2018 NCAA Division I FBS football season. The Bobcats played their home games at Bobcat Stadium in San Marcos, Texas, and competed in the West Division of the Sun Belt Conference. They were led by third-year head coach Everett Withers. They finished the season 3–9, 1–7 in Sun Belt play to finish in last place in the West Division.

On November 18, head coach Everett Withers was fired. Defensive coordinator Chris Woods served as the interim head coach in their final game of the season. Withers finished at Texas State with a three-year record of 7–28. On November 28, West Virginia offensive coordinator Jake Spavital was hired as head coach for Texas State.

== Preseason ==
=== Award watch lists ===
Award	Player	Position	Year
Wuerffel Trophy	Tyler Watts	WR	SR

=== Sun Belt coaches poll ===
On July 19, 2018, the Sun Belt released their preseason coaches poll with the Bobcats predicted to finish in last place in the West Division.

=== Preseason All-Sun Belt Teams ===
The Bobcats had three players at four positions selected to the preseason all-Sun Belt teams.

Offense

2nd team

Aaron Brewer – OL

Defense

2nd team

Bryan London II – LB

== Schedule ==
Date	Time	Opponent	Site	TV	Result	Attendance
September 1	11:00 a.m.	at Rutgers*	HighPoint.com Stadium; Piscataway, NJ	BTN	L 7–35	40,124
September 8	6:00 p.m.	Texas Southern*	Bobcat Stadium; San Marcos, TX	KNVA	W 36–20	15,440
September 15	6:00 p.m.	at South Alabama	Ladd–Peebles Stadium; Mobile, AL	ESPN+	L 31–41	16,051
September 22	6:00 p.m.	at UTSA*	Alamodome; San Antonio, TX (I-35 Rivalry)	ESPN+	L 21–25	29,205
October 6	6:00 p.m.	Louisiana	Bobcat Stadium; San Marcos, TX	ESPN+	L 27–42	17,062
October 11	6:30 p.m.	Georgia Southern	Bobcat Stadium; San Marcos, TX	ESPNU	L 13–15	9,545
October 20	6:00 p.m.	at Louisiana–Monroe	Malone Stadium; Monroe, LA	ESPN3	L 14–20	13,235
October 27	6:00 p.m.	New Mexico State*^{†}	Bobcat Stadium; San Marcos, TX	ESPN3	W 27–20	15,045
November 3	1:00 p.m.	at Georgia State	Georgia State Stadium; Atlanta, GA	ESPN+	W 40–31	11,312
November 10	3:00 p.m.	Appalachian State	Bobcat Stadium; San Marcos, TX	ESPN3	L 7–38	11,482
November 17	2:30 p.m.	at Troy	Veterans Memorial Stadium; Troy, AL	ESPN+	L 7–12	20,437
November 24	3:00 p.m.	Arkansas State	Bobcat Stadium; San Marcos, TX	ESPN3	L 7–33	10,115
*Non-conference game; ^{†}Homecoming; All times are in Central time

== Game summaries ==
=== At Rutgers ===
	1	2	3	4	Total
Bobcats	0	0	7	0	7
Scarlet Knights	7	14	7	7	35

=== Texas Southern ===
	1	2	3	4	Total
Tigers	0	0	7	13	20
Bobcats	3	13	10	10	36

=== At South Alabama ===
	1	2	3	4	Total
Bobcats	17	7	7	0	31
Jaguars	3	13	7	18	41

=== At UTSA ===
	1	2	3	4	Total
Bobcats	7	0	7	7	21
Roadrunners	14	3	0	8	25

=== Louisiana ===
	1	2	3	4	Total
Ragin' Cajuns	7	21	7	7	42
Bobcats	0	0	13	14	27

=== Georgia Southern ===
	1	2	3	4	Total
Eagles	0	10	5	0	15
Bobcats	0	0	7	6	13

=== At Louisiana–Monroe ===
Week Eight: Texas State Bobcats at Louisiana–Monroe Warhawks – Game summary

Quarter	1	2	3	4	Total
Bobcats	7	0	0	7	14
Warhawks	7	10	3	0	20

at Malone Stadium • Monroe, LA

- Date: October 20
- Game time: 6:00 p.m. CDT
- Game weather: 65° · Partly Cloudy · N – 12 mph.
- Game attendance: 13,235
- Referee: Marshall Lewis
- TV: ESPN3

Game information

First quarter

- TXST - Tyler Vitt 7-yard TD run, Clayton Stewart kick good, 8:38 (TXST 7-0)
- ULM - Austin Vaughn 2-yard TD run, Craig Ford kick good, 6:47 (TIE 7-7)

Second quarter

- ULM - Ford 43-yard field goal, 11:10 (ULM 10-7)
- ULM - Brandius Batiste 27-yard TD pass from Caleb Evans, Ford kick good, 4:41 (ULM 17-7)

Third quarter

- ULM - Ford 30-yard field goal, 0:44 (ULM 20-7)

Fourth quarter

- TXST - Robert Brown Jr., 4-yard TD run, Stewart kick good, 7:18 (ULM 20-14)

Leading Passers

- ULM - Caleb Evans - 13/29, 124 yards, TD
- TXST - Tyler Vitt - 15/25, 115 yards

Leading Rushers

- ULM - Caleb Evans - 14 carries, 85 yards
- TXST - Robert Brown Jr. - 10 carries, 46 yards, TD

Leading Receivers

- ULM - Marcus Green - 3 receptions, 36 yards
- TXST - Keenen Brown - 4 receptions, 50 yards

=== New Mexico State ===
	1	2	3	4	Total
Aggies	0	13	7	0	20
Bobcats	13	7	7	0	27

=== At Georgia State ===
	1	2	3	4	Total
Bobcats	13	0	20	7	40
Panthers	7	3	0	21	31

=== Appalachian State ===
	1	2	3	4	Total
Mountaineers	7	14	7	10	38
Bobcats	0	0	7	0	7

=== At Troy ===
	1	2	3	4	Total
Bobcats	0	0	0	7	7
Trojans	3	6	0	3	12

=== Arkansas State ===
	1	2	3	4	Total
Red Wolves	7	0	21	5	33
Bobcats	0	0	7	0	7

== Coaching staff ==
After the 2017 season, Texas State hired Kyle Hoke as their 10th assistant coach. Defensive coordinator, Randall McCray, left San Marcos to join the coaching staff of the Arizona Cardinals, and Director of Football Operations, John Streicher, joined the staff of the Tennessee Titans. Withers promoted equipment manager, Zack Lucas, to Director of Football Operations. Oklahoma Offensive Quality Coach Chris Woods was hired to replace Randall McCray as the Defensive Coordinator by Withers. Co-Offensive Coordinator Parker Fleming left San Marcos to become the Special Teams Quality Control at Ohio State. On November 18, 2018 just after the second to last game of the 2018 season Everett Withers was released as the 19th Head Football Coach of Texas State after lack of success and improvement for the program. Defensive Coordinator Chris Woods became the interim coach for the season finale in Bobcat Stadium against Arkansas State. Coach Everett Withers was replaced by West Virginia offensive coordinator Jake Spavital.

Name	Position	Year	Former Texas State positions held	Alma mater
Everett Withers	Head Coach	2016		Appalachian State 1985
Brett Elliott	Quarterback Coach	2018	Offensive Coordinator/Quarterbacks 2016	Linfield College 2005
Chris Woods	Defensive Coordinator/Inside Linebackers, Interim Head Coach	2018		Davidson 1991
Zak Kuhr	Offensive Coordinator/Running Backs	2017		Florida 2013
Preston Mason	Outside Linebackers	2017	Defensive Graduate Assistant 2016, Safeties 2017	Appalachian State 2014
Adrian Mayes	Tight Ends/Recruiting Coordinator	2016	Offensive Line	Kansas 2008
Ron Antoine	Wide Receivers	2016	Running Backs/Tight Ends	Colorado State 1997
Kyle Hoke	Secondary	2018		Ball State 2012
Jules Montinar	Cornerbacks/Special Teams Coordinator	2016	Cornerbacks 2016-2017	Eastern Kentucky 2009
Issac Mooring	Defensive Line	2017		North Carolina 2003
Eric Mateos	Offensive Line	2017		Southwest Baptist 2011
Zack Lucas	Director of Football Operations	2015	Equipment Manager 2015-2017, Asst Eq Manager 2012	Oklahoma State 2010
Michael George	Director of Player Personnel	2016		Washington University in St. Louis 2005
Clayton Barnes	Director of Player Development	2017	Offensive Line Intern 2016	Texas A&M 2015
