= 2018 South Alabama Jaguars football team =

American college football season

2018 South Alabama Jaguars football
- Conference: Sun Belt Conference
- West Division
- Record: 3–9 (2–6 Sun Belt)
- Head coach: Steve Campbell (1st season)
- Offensive coordinator: Kenny Edenfield (1st season)
- Offensive scheme: Spread
- Defensive coordinator: Greg Stewart (1st season)
- Base defense: 4–3
- Home stadium: Ladd–Peebles Stadium

2018 Sun Belt Conference football standings
	Conf.			Overall
Team	W		L	W		L
East Division
Appalachian State xy$	7	–	1	11	–	2
Troy x	7	–	1	10	–	3
Georgia Southern	6	–	2	10	–	3
Coastal Carolina	2	–	6	5	–	7
Georgia State	1	–	7	2	–	10
West Division
Louisiana xy	5	–	3	7	–	7
Arkansas State x	5	–	3	8	–	5
Louisiana–Monroe	4	–	4	6	–	6
South Alabama	2	–	6	3	–	9
Texas State	1	–	7	3	–	9
Championship: Appalachian State 30, Louisiana 19
$ – Conference champion; x – Division champion/co-champions; y – Championship game participant

The 2018 South Alabama Jaguars football team represented the University of South Alabama in the 2018 NCAA Division I FBS football season. The Jaguars played their home games at Ladd–Peebles Stadium in Mobile, Alabama, and competed in the West Division of the Sun Belt Conference. They were led by first-year head coach Steve Campbell. They finished the season 3–9, 2–6 in Sun Belt play to finish in fourth place in the West Division.

== Preseason ==
=== Award watch lists ===
Listed in the order that they were released

Award	Player	Position	Year
Fred Biletnikoff Award	Jamarius Way	WR	JR
Ray Guy Award	Corliss Waitman	P	JR
Wuerffel Trophy	T.J. Brunson	LB	JR

=== Sun Belt coaches poll ===
On July 19, 2018, the Sun Belt released their preseason coaches poll with the Jaguars predicted to finish in third place in the West Division.

=== Preseason All-Sun Belt Teams ===
The Jaguars had five players selected to the preseason all-Sun Belt teams.

Offense

1st team

Jamarius Way – WR

Defense

2nd team

Tyree Turner – DL

Bull Barge – LB

Special teams

1st team

Gavin Patterson – K

Corliss Waitman – P

== Schedule ==
Date	Time	Opponent	Site	TV	Result	Attendance
September 1	6:00 p.m.	Louisiana Tech*	Ladd–Peebles Stadium; Mobile, AL	ESPN+	L 26–30	13,457
September 8	7:00 p.m.	at Oklahoma State*	Boone Pickens Stadium; Stillwater, OK	FSN	L 13–55	53,923
September 15	6:00 p.m.	Texas State	Ladd–Peebles Stadium; Mobile, AL	ESPN+	W 41–31	16,051
September 22	7:00 p.m.	at Memphis*	Liberty Bowl Memorial Stadium; Memphis, TN	ESPN3	L 35–52	27,765
September 29	2:30 p.m.	at Appalachian State	Kidd Brewer Stadium; Boone, NC	ESPN+	L 7–52	25,862
October 6	2:30 p.m.	at Georgia Southern	Paulson Stadium; Statesboro, GA	ESPN3	L 13–48	17,622
October 13	4:00 p.m.	Alabama State*	Ladd–Peebles Stadium; Mobile, AL	ESPN+	W 45–7	16,231
October 23	7:00 p.m.	Troy	Ladd–Peebles Stadium; Mobile, AL (Battle for the Belt)	ESPN2	L 17–38	25,878
November 3	2:00 p.m.	at Arkansas State	Centennial Bank Stadium; Jonesboro, AR	ESPN+	L 14–38	20,671
November 10	4:00 p.m.	Louisiana–Monroe	Ladd–Peebles Stadium; Mobile, AL	ESPN+	L 10–38	14,096
November 17	4:00 p.m.	at Louisiana	Cajun Field; Lafayette, LA	ESPN3	L 38–48	15,168
November 23	2:00 p.m.	Coastal Carolina	Ladd–Peebles Stadium; Mobile, AL	ESPN+	W 31–28	10,670
*Non-conference game; All times are in Central time

== Game summaries ==
=== Louisiana Tech ===
Louisiana Tech at South Alabama – Game summary

Quarter	1	2	3	4	Total
Bulldogs	7	13	3	7	30
Jaguars	0	7	6	13	26

at Ladd-Peebles Stadium, Mobile, AL

- Date: September 1
- Game time: 6:00 p.m. CST
- Game weather: 79 °F (26 °C); partly cloudy
- Game attendance: 13,457
- Referee: Steve LaMantia
- TV: ESPN+

Game information

First quarter

- LT - Jaqwis Dancy 8-yard TD run, Bailey Hale kick good, 8:41 (LT 7-0)

Second quarter

- LT - Dancy 1-yard TD run, Hale kick no good, 13:18 (LT 13-0)
- USA - Kawaan Baker 28-yard TD run, Gavin Patterson kick good, 7:54 (LT 13-7)
- LT - Bobby Holly 1-yard TD pass from J'Mar Smith, Hale kick good, 0:34 (LT 20-7)

Third quarter

- LT - Hale 23-yard field goal, 11:42 (LT 23-7)
- USA - Baker 3-yard TD pass from Cole Garvin, two-point conversion attempt no good, 6:59 (LT 23-13)

Fourth quarter

- USA - Maurice Mayo 5-yard TD run, Patterson kick good, 8:18 (LT 23-20)
- LT - Adrian Hardy 8-yard TD pass from Smith, Hale kick good, 2:19 (LT 30-20)
- USA - Baker 4-yard TD run, Patterson kick no good, 1:11 (LT 30-26)

Top passers

- LT - J'Mar Smith - 19/29, 209 yards, 2 TD, 3 INT
- USA - Cole Garvin - 7/16, 47 yards, TD, 2 INT

Top rushers

- LT - Jaqwis Dancy - 15 carries, 144 yards, 2 TD
- USA - Evan Orth - 2 carries, 74 yards

Top receivers

- LT - Adrian Hardy - 3 receptions, 73 yards, TD
- USA - Jamarius Way - 2 receptions, 31 yards

=== At Oklahoma State ===
	1	2	3	4	Total
Jaguars	7	6	0	0	13
Cowboys	14	17	10	14	55

=== Texas State ===
	1	2	3	4	Total
Bobcats	17	7	7	0	31
Jaguars	3	13	7	18	41

=== At Memphis ===
	1	2	3	4	Total
Jaguars	7	14	6	8	35
Tigers	7	14	10	21	52

=== At Appalachian State ===
South Alabama at Appalachian State – Game summary

Quarter	1	2	3	4	Total
Jaguars	7	0	0	0	7
Mountaineers	21	21	3	7	52

at Kidd Brewer Stadium, Boone, North Carolina

- Date: September 29
- Game time: 2:35 p.m. CDT
- Game weather: 71 °F (22 °C); partly cloudy
- Game attendance: 25,862
- Referee: Kyle Olson
- TV announcers (ESPN+): Harrison Battle, Pierre Banks

Game information

First quarter

- APP – Zac Thomas, 54-yard TD run, (Chandler Staton kick), 13:11 (APP 0–7)
- USA - Kawaan Baker, 2-yard TD run, (Gavin Patterson kick), 6:12 (TIE 7–7)
- APP – Jalin Moore, 7-yard TD run, (Chandler Staton kick), 5:37 (APP 7–14)
- APP – Zac Thomas, 7-yard TD run, (Chandler Staton kick), 3:10 (APP 7–21)

Second quarter

- APP - Corey Sutton, 2-yard TD pass from Zac Thomas, (Chandler Staton kick), 12:22 (APP 7–28)
- APP – Jalin Moore, 2-yard TD run, (Chandler Staton kick), 4:45 (APP 7–35)
- APP – Marcus Williams, 27-yard TD pass from Zac Thomas, (Chandler Staton kick), 2:41 (APP 7–42)

Third quarter

- APP – Chandler Staton, 23-yard field goal, 0:46 (APP 7–45)

Fourth quarter

- APP – Collin Reed, 3-yard TD pass from Peyton Derrick, (Chandler Staton kick), 3:04 (APP 7–52)

Top passers

- USA – Evan Orth – 20/33, 225 yards, INT
- APP – Zac Thomas – 8/18, 146 yards, 2 TD, 2 INT

Top rushers

- USA – Tra Minter – 9 carries, 44 yards
- APP – Jalin Moore – 19 carries, 123 yards, 2 TD

Top receivers

- USA – Kawaan Baker – 4 receptions, 89 yards
- APP – Thomas Hennigan – 4 receptions, 65 yards
- APP – Corey Sutton – 2 receptions, 46 yards, TD

Top defenders

- USA – Nigel Lawrence – 7 tackles
- APP – Akeem Davis-Gaither – 8 tackles, 1.5 tackles-for-loss (TFL)
- APP – Tae Hayes – 4 tackles, interception

=== At Georgia Southern ===
	1	2	3	4	Total
Jaguars	0	6	0	7	13
Eagles	7	10	10	21	48

=== Alabama State ===
	1	2	3	4	Total
Hornets	0	7	0	0	7
Jaguars	7	21	10	7	45

=== Troy ===
	1	2	3	4	Total
Trojans	16	15	0	17	48
Jaguars	7	10	0	0	17

=== At Arkansas State ===
	1	2	3	4	Total
Jaguars	0	7	0	7	14
Red Wolves	0	14	14	10	38

=== Louisiana–Monroe ===
Week Eleven: Louisiana–Monroe Warhawks at South Alabama Jaguars – Game summary

Quarter	1	2	3	4	Total
Warhawks	10	14	14	0	38
Jaguars	7	3	0	0	10

at Ladd–Peebles Stadium • Mobile, AL

- Date: November 10
- Game time: 4:00 p.m. CST
- Game weather: 74° · Sunny · SW – 11 mph.
- Game attendance: 14,096
- Referee: Jason Autrey
- TV: ESPN+

Game information

First quarter

- USA - Jordan McCray 34-yard TD pass from Cephus Johnson, Gavin Patterson kick good, 10:58 (USA 7-0)
- ULM - Craig Ford 21-yard field goal, 7:27 (USA 7-3)
- ULM - Caleb Evans 4-yard TD run, Ford kick good, 0:36 (ULM 10-7)

Second quarter

- USA - Gavin Patterson 31-yard field goal, 9:34 (TIE 10-10)
- ULM - Jonathan Hodoh 29-yard TD pass from Evans, Ford kick good, 6:24 (ULM 17-10)
- ULM - D'Marius Gillespie 5-yard TD pass from Evans, Ford kick good, 0:22 (ULM 24-10)

Third quarter

- ULM - Marcus Green 10-yard TD run, Ford kick good, 12:34 (ULM 31-10)
- ULM - Evans 15-yard TD run, Ford kick good, 5:50 (ULM 38-10)

Leading Passers

- ULM - Caleb Evans - 27/32, 367 yards, 2 TD
- USA - Cole Garvin - 13/19, 95 yards

Leading Rushers

- ULM - Marcus Green - 2 carries, 68 yards, TD
- USA - Tra Minter - 12 carries, 61 yards

Leading Receivers

- ULM - D'Marcus Gillespie - 7 receptions, 159 yards, TD
- USA - Jordan McCray - 3 receptions, 45 yards, TD

=== At Louisiana ===
	1	2	3	4	Total
Jaguars	0	17	7	14	38
Ragin' Cajuns	10	14	17	7	48

=== Coastal Carolina ===
	1	2	3	4	Total
Chanticleers	0	7	7	14	28
Jaguars	10	14	7	0	31
