= 2018 Georgia State Panthers football team =

American college football season

2018 Georgia State Panthers football
- Conference: Sun Belt Conference
- East Division
- Record: 2–10 (1–7 Sun Belt)
- Head coach: Shawn Elliott (2nd season)
- Offensive coordinator: Travis Trickett (2nd season)
- Offensive scheme: Spread
- Defensive coordinator: Nate Fuqua (2nd season)
- Base defense: 4–2–5
- Home stadium: Georgia State Stadium

2018 Sun Belt Conference football standings
	Conf.			Overall
Team	W		L	W		L
East Division
Appalachian State xy$	7	–	1	11	–	2
Troy x	7	–	1	10	–	3
Georgia Southern	6	–	2	10	–	3
Coastal Carolina	2	–	6	5	–	7
Georgia State	1	–	7	2	–	10
West Division
Louisiana xy	5	–	3	7	–	7
Arkansas State x	5	–	3	8	–	5
Louisiana–Monroe	4	–	4	6	–	6
South Alabama	2	–	6	3	–	9
Texas State	1	–	7	3	–	9
Championship: Appalachian State 30, Louisiana 19
$ – Conference champion; x – Division champion/co-champions; y – Championship game participant

The 2018 Georgia State Panthers football team represented Georgia State University (GSU) in the 2018 NCAA Division I FBS football season. The Panthers were led by second-year head coach Shawn Elliott. The season was the Panthers' sixth in the Sun Belt Conference, first within the East Division, and ninth since starting football. They played their home games at Georgia State Stadium. They finished the season 2–10, 1–7 in Sun Belt play to finish in last place in the East Division.

== Recruiting ==
=== Recruits ===
As of December 21, 2016, the Panthers have a total of 20 recruits committed. Eight are three-star recruits.

College recruiting information
Name	Hometown	School	Height	Weight	40^{‡}	Commit date
Despelado Alexandre; OT	Deerfield Beach, FL	Deerfield Beach High School	6 ft 5 in (1.96 m)	275 lb (125 kg)	-	Jun 27, 2017
Despelado Alexandre; OT	Recruit ratings: Scout: 247Sports:					
Danterius Ellington; QB	Fulton, MS	Itawamba Community College	6 ft 2 in (1.88 m)	192 lb (87 kg)	-	Dec 16, 2017
Danterius Ellington; QB	Recruit ratings: 247Sports:					
Jacorey Crawford; CB	Thomson, GA	Thomson High School	6 ft 1 in (1.85 m)	205 lb (93 kg)	-	Nov 3, 2017
Jacorey Crawford; CB	Recruit ratings: 247Sports:					
Diondre Champaigne; WR	North Charleston, SC	Fort Dorchester High School	6 ft 3 in (1.91 m)	194 lb (88 kg)	-	Sep 20, 2017
Diondre Champaigne; WR	Recruit ratings: Scout: 247Sports: ESPN: (77)					
Tyler Gore; CB	Little River, SC	North Myrtle Beach High School	5 ft 10 in (1.78 m)	170 lb (77 kg)	-	Jul 22, 2017
Tyler Gore; CB	Recruit ratings: 247Sports:					
Destin Coates; RB	Tallahassee, FL	James S. Rickards High School	5 ft 10 in (1.78 m)	190 lb (86 kg)	-	Jan 21, 2018
Destin Coates; RB	Recruit ratings: Scout: 247Sports: ESPN: (73)					
Swift Lyle; QB	Mobile, AL	St. Paul's Episcopal School	6 ft 3 in (1.91 m)	185 lb (84 kg)	-	Jan 31, 2018
Swift Lyle; QB	Recruit ratings: Scout: 247Sports: ESPN: (80)					
Sam Pinckney; WR	Greenwood, SC	Greenwood High School	6 ft 4 in (1.93 m)	210 lb (95 kg)	-	Jan 21, 2018
Sam Pinckney; WR	Recruit ratings: 247Sports:					
Akeem Smith; DT	Virginia Beach, VA	Bishop Sullivan Catholic High School	6 ft 1 in (1.85 m)	295 lb (134 kg)	5.68	Dec 5, 2017
Akeem Smith; DT	Recruit ratings: 247Sports:					
Courtney Williams; WR	Hogansville, GA	Callaway High School	6 ft 2 in (1.88 m)	179 lb (81 kg)	-	Feb 7, 2018
Courtney Williams; WR	Recruit ratings: 247Sports:					
Blake Carroll; LB	Lawrenceville, GA	Mountain View High School	6 ft 2 in (1.88 m)	219 lb (99 kg)	4.84	Dec 10, 2017
Blake Carroll; LB	Recruit ratings: 247Sports:					
Cornelius McCoy; WR	Deerfield Beach, FL	Deerfield Beach High School	5 ft 11 in (1.80 m)	170 lb (77 kg)	-	Dec 17, 2017
Cornelius McCoy; WR	Recruit ratings: Scout: 247Sports: ESPN: (73)					
Quavian White; CB, RB	Greer, SC	Greer High School	5 ft 9 in (1.75 m)	178 lb (81 kg)	4.78	Jul 22, 2017
Quavian White; CB, RB	Recruit ratings: 247Sports:					
Dawson Hill; RB	Hoschton, GA	Mill Creek High School	5 ft 11 in (1.80 m)	190 lb (86 kg)	4.58	Jul 4, 2017
Dawson Hill; RB	Recruit ratings: 247Sports:					
Travis Glover; OT	Vienna, GA	Dooly County High School	6 ft 5 in (1.96 m)	310 lb (140 kg)	-	Feb 7, 2018
Travis Glover; OT	Recruit ratings: 247Sports:					
D'angelo Knight; S	North Charleston, SC	Fort Dorchester High School	6 ft 2 in (1.88 m)	215 lb (98 kg)	-	Jul 27, 2017
D'angelo Knight; S	Recruit ratings: 247Sports:					
Jontrey Hunter; S	Tampa, FL	Sickles High School	6 ft 2 in (1.88 m)	205 lb (93 kg)	4.50	Jan 29, 2018
Jontrey Hunter; S	Recruit ratings: 247Sports:					
Seth Paige; RB	Glen Saint Mary, FL	Baker County High School	5 ft 10 in (1.78 m)	176 lb (80 kg)	4.47	Dec 17, 2017
Seth Paige; RB	Recruit ratings: 247Sports:					
Brandon Joseph; OG	Lawrenceville, GA	Central Gwinnett High School	6 ft 2 in (1.88 m)	280 lb (130 kg)	-	Jun 19, 2017
Brandon Joseph; OG	Recruit ratings: 247Sports:					
Herman McCray; TE	West Palm Beach, FL	Oxbridge Academy	6 ft 4 in (1.93 m)	230 lb (100 kg)	4.86	Aug 13, 2017
Herman McCray; TE	Recruit ratings: 247Sports:					
Mario Dungy; DT	Eight Mile, AL	Blount County	6 ft 3 in (1.91 m)	285 lb (129 kg)	-	Aug 13, 2017
Mario Dungy; DT	Recruit ratings: 247Sports:					
Marlon Young; LB	Opelousas, LA	Opelousas High School	6 ft 3 in (1.91 m)	245 lb (111 kg)	4.67	Oct 13, 2017
Marlon Young; LB	Recruit ratings: 247Sports:					
TJ Smith; DE	Laurinburg, NC	Scotland County High School	6 ft 2 in (1.88 m)	240 lb (110 kg)	-	Jul 4, 2017
TJ Smith; DE	Recruit ratings: 247Sports:					
Zachary Dixon; TE	Hollywood, FL	Chaminade-Madonna College Preparatory School	6 ft 2 in (1.88 m)	205 lb (93 kg)	4.60	Jan 28, 2018
Zachary Dixon; TE	Recruit ratings: 247Sports:					
Tre Moore; DE	Johnston, SC	Strom Thurmond High School	6 ft 2 in (1.88 m)	230 lb (100 kg)	-	Jun 27, 2017
Tre Moore; DE	Recruit ratings: 247Sports:					
Johnathan Bass; OT	Marietta, GA	Carlton J. Kell High School	6 ft 4 in (1.93 m)	270 lb (120 kg)	5.20	Nov 25, 2017
Johnathan Bass; OT	Recruit ratings: 247Sports:					
Samuel Oshodi; WR	Fort Lauderdale, FL	Cypress Bay High School	5 ft 11 in (1.80 m)	170 lb (77 kg)	-	Jul 23, 2017
Samuel Oshodi; WR	Recruit ratings: 247Sports:					
Overall recruit ranking: 247Sports: 94
Note: In many cases, Scout, Rivals, 247Sports, On3, and ESPN may conflict in their listings of height and weight.; In these cases, the average was taken. ESPN grades are on a 100-point scale.; Sources: "2018 Team Ranking". Rivals.com.

== Preseason ==
=== Award watch lists ===
Listed in the order that they were released

Award	Player	Position	Year
Fred Biletnikoff Award	Penny Hart	WR	JR
John Mackey Award	Camrin Knight	TE	JR

=== Sun Belt coaches poll ===
On July 19, 2018, the Sun Belt released their preseason coaches poll with the Panthers predicted to finish in third place in the East Division.

=== Preseason All-Sun Belt Teams ===
The Panthers had five players selected to the preseason all-Sun Belt teams.

Offense

1st team

Penny Hart – WR

2nd team

Hunter Atkinson – TE

Shamarious Gilmore – OL

Defense

1st team

Michael Shaw – LB

2nd team

Marterious Allen – DL

== Coaching and support staff ==
Name	Position	Consecutive season at Georgia State in current position
Shawn Elliott	Head coach	2nd
Travis Trickett	Offensive coordinator, quarterback	2nd
Nate Fuqua	Defensive coordinator, outside linebackers	2nd
Tim Bowens	Assistant coach, running backs	1st
Chris Collins	Assistant coach, safeties	2nd
Blake Gideon	Assistant coach, cornerbacks	1st
Skylor Magee	Assistant coach, defensive line	2nd
Trent McKnight	Assistant coach, wide receivers	2nd
Josh Stepp	Assistant coach, tight ends	2nd
Cedric Williams	Assistant coach, offensive line	2nd
Rusty Wright	Assistant coach, inside linebacker	2nd
Steve Wojcikowski	Director of football operations	2nd
Scott Holsopple	Head strength and conditioning coach	3rd
Bob Murphy	Associate AD, sports medicine and nutrition	3rd

== Schedule ==
Georgia State announced its 2018 football schedule on February 27, 2018. The 2018 schedule consisted of 6 home and away games in the regular season. The Panthers hosted Sun Belt foes ULM, Coastal Carolina, Texas State, and in-state rivals Georgia Southern, and traveled to Troy, Arkansas State, Louisiana, and Appalachian State. Georgia State would not play Sun Belt foe South Alabama this year. The team would play four non-conference games, two home game against Kennesaw State, an FCS team from the Big South Conference, Western Michigan from the Mid-American Conference (MAC), and two road games against NC State from the Atlantic Coast Conference (ACC) and Memphis from the American Athletic Conference (AAC).

Date	Time	Opponent	Site	TV	Result	Attendance
August 30	7:00 p.m.	No. 5 (FCS) Kennesaw State*	Georgia State Stadium; Atlanta, GA	ESPN+	W 24–20	23,088
September 8	12:30 p.m.	at NC State*	Carter–Finley Stadium; Raleigh, NC	ACCRSN	L 7–41	56,017
September 14	8:00 p.m.	at Memphis*	Liberty Bowl Memorial Stadium; Memphis, TN	ESPN	L 22–59	27,678
September 22	2:00 p.m.	Western Michigan*	Georgia State Stadium; Atlanta, GA	ESPN+	L 15–34	15,264
September 29	2:00 p.m.	Louisiana–Monroe	Georgia State Stadium; Atlanta, GA	ESPN+	W 46–14	14,368
October 4	7:30 p.m.	at Troy	Veterans Memorial Stadium; Troy, AL	ESPNU	L 20–37	22,903
October 18	7:30 p.m.	at Arkansas State	Centennial Bank Stadium; Jonesboro, AR	ESPNU	L 35–51	18,176
October 27	2:00 p.m.	Coastal Carolina	Georgia State Stadium; Atlanta, GA	ESPN+	L 34–37	15,648
November 3	2:00 p.m.	Texas State	Georgia State Stadium; Atlanta, GA	ESPN+	L 31–40	11,312
November 10	5:00 p.m.	at Louisiana	Cajun Field; Lafayette, LA	ESPN+	L 22–36	14,945
November 17	2:30 p.m.	at Appalachian State	Kidd Brewer Stadium; Boone, NC	ESPN+	L 17–45	22,315
November 24	2:00 p.m.	Georgia Southern	Georgia State Stadium; Atlanta, GA (rivalry)	ESPN+	L 14–35	20,011
*Non-conference game; Rankings from AP Poll released prior to the game; All times are in Eastern time

Schedule source:

== Game summaries ==
=== Kennesaw State ===
	1	2	3	4	Total
No. 5 (FCS) Owls	7	7	6	0	20
Panthers	0	14	0	10	24

=== At NC State ===
Week Two: Georgia State Panthers at NC State Wolfpack − Game summary

Quarter	1	2	3	4	Total
Panthers	7	0	0	0	7
Wolfpack	10	10	7	14	41

at Carter–Finley Stadium • Raleigh, NC

- Date: September 8, 2018
- Game time: 12:30 p.m.
- Game weather: Mostly Sunny
- Game attendance: 56,017
- Referee: David Epperley
- TV announcers (ACCRSN): Wes Durham, James Bates
- Sources:,

Game information

First quarter

- 12:37 GSU TD – Destin Coates 5 yard run (Matthew Wright PAT)
- 09:32 NCSU TD – Ryan Finley 5 yard pass to Thayer Thomas (Christopher Dunn PAT)
- 03:22 NCSU FG – Christopher Dunn 25 yard field goal

Second quarter

- 10:41 NCSU TD – Reggie Gallaspy 1 yard run (Christopher Dunn PAT)
- 00:00 NCSU FG – Christopher Dunn 28 yard field goal

Third quarter

- 03:43 NCSU TD – Ryan Finley 1 yard pass to Trent Pennix (Christopher Dunn PAT)

Fourth quarter

- 03:12 NCSU TD – Brady Bodine 39 yard run (Christopher Dunn PAT)
- 01:12 NCSU TD – Matthew McKay 1 yard run (Christopher Dunn PAT)

Top passers

- GSU – Dan Ellington: 15–28, 194 yards
- NCSU – Ryan Finley: 31–38, 370 yards, 2 TDs

Top rushers

- GSU – Destin Coates: 6 rushes, 43 yards, 1 TD
- NCSU – Brady Bodine: 5 rushes, 50 yards, 1 TD

Top Receiving

- GSU – Devin Gentry: 5 receptions, 83 yards
- NCSU – Kelvin Harmon: 8 receptions, 129 yards

=== At Memphis ===
	1	2	3	4	Total
Panthers	3	7	6	6	22
Tigers	21	17	7	14	59

=== Western Michigan ===
	1	2	3	4	Total
Broncos	3	17	14	0	34
Panthers	0	9	6	0	15

=== Louisiana–Monroe ===
Week Five: Louisiana–Monroe Warhawks at Georgia State Panthers – Game summary

Quarter	1	2	3	4	Total
Warhawks	7	7	0	0	14
Panthers	14	16	6	10	46

at Georgia State Stadium • Atlanta, GA

- Date: September 29
- Game time: 1:00 p.m. CDT
- Game weather: 83° · Partly Sunny · WNW – 5 mph.
- Game attendance: 14,368
- Referee: Ted Pitts
- TV: ESPN+

Game information

First quarter

- GSU - Dan Ellington 1-yard TD run, Brandon Wright kick good, 11:55 (GSU 7-0)
- GSU - Tra Barnett 23-yard TD run, Wright kick good, 7:18 (GSU 14-0)
- ULM - Caleb Evans 21-yard TD run, Craig Ford kick good, 4:26 (GSU 14-7)

Second quarter

- GSU - Roger Carter 4-yard TD pass from Ellington, Wright kick no good, 13:00 (GSU 20-7)
- GSU - Seth Paige 82-yard TD run, Wright kick good, 11:48 (GSU 27-7)
- ULM - Evans 12-yard TD run, Ford kick good, 9:34 (GSU 27-14)
- GSU - Wright 42-yard field goal, 1:51 (GSU 30-14)

Third quarter

- GSU - Paige 1-yard TD run, Wright kick no good, 6:19 (GSU 36-14)

Fourth quarter

- GSU - Wright 35-yard field goal, 14:13 (GSU 39-14)
- GSU - Penny Hart 49-yard punt returned for TD, Wright kick good, 12:36 (GSU 46-14)

Leading Passers

- GSU - Dan Ellington - 15/18, 179 yards, TD
- ULM - Caleb Evans - 19/32, 136 yards, 2 INT

Leading Rushers

- GSU - Seth Paige - 9 carries, 145 yards, 2 TD
- ULM - Kayn White - carry, 46 yards

Leading Receivers

- GSU - Sam Pinckney - 2 receptions, 74 yards
- ULM - Marcus Green - 2 receptions, 33 yards

=== At Troy ===
	1	2	3	4	Total
Panthers	0	3	3	14	20
Trojans	14	9	0	14	37

=== At Arkansas State ===
	1	2	3	4	Total
Panthers	7	0	14	14	35
Red Wolves	20	14	7	10	51

=== Coastal Carolina ===
	1	2	3	4	Total
Chanticleers	17	3	7	10	37
Panthers	7	6	21	0	34

=== Texas State ===
	1	2	3	4	Total
Bobcats	13	0	20	7	40
Panthers	7	3	0	21	31

=== At Louisiana ===
	1	2	3	4	Total
Panthers	0	7	7	8	22
Ragin' Cajuns	7	6	3	20	36

=== At Appalachian State ===
	1	2	3	4	Total
Panthers	7	0	3	7	17
Mountaineers	14	3	14	14	45

=== Georgia Southern ===
	1	2	3	4	Total
Eagles	0	13	15	7	35
Panthers	0	0	0	14	14
