= 2018 Georgia Southern Eagles football team =

American college football season

2018 Georgia Southern Eagles football

Camellia Bowl champion

Camellia Bowl, W 23–21 vs. Eastern Michigan
- Conference: Sun Belt Conference
- East Division
- Record: 10–3 (6–2 Sun Belt)
- Head coach: Chad Lunsford (1st season)
- Offensive coordinator: Bob DeBesse (1st season)
- Offensive scheme: Pistol
- Defensive coordinator: Scot Sloan (1st season)
- Base defense: 3–4
- Home stadium: Paulson Stadium

2018 Sun Belt Conference football standings
	Conf.			Overall
Team	W		L	W		L
East Division
Appalachian State xy$	7	–	1	11	–	2
Troy x	7	–	1	10	–	3
Georgia Southern	6	–	2	10	–	3
Coastal Carolina	2	–	6	5	–	7
Georgia State	1	–	7	2	–	10
West Division
Louisiana xy	5	–	3	7	–	7
Arkansas State x	5	–	3	8	–	5
Louisiana–Monroe	4	–	4	6	–	6
South Alabama	2	–	6	3	–	9
Texas State	1	–	7	3	–	9
Championship: Appalachian State 30, Louisiana 19
$ – Conference champion; x – Division champion/co-champions; y – Championship game participant

The 2018 Georgia Southern Eagles football team represented Georgia Southern University in the 2018 NCAA Division I FBS football season. The Eagles played their home games at Paulson Stadium in Statesboro, Georgia, and competed in the East Division of the Sun Belt Conference. They were led by first-year head coach Chad Lunsford. They finished the season 10–3, 6–2 in Sun Belt play to finish in third place in the East Division. They were invited to the Camellia Bowl where they defeated Eastern Michigan.

The Eagles had the biggest turnaround in FBS in 2018, going from a 2–10 record in 2017 to 10–3. They also set a new FBS record by losing only five turnovers during the season. The previous record of eight had been achieved by six teams, most recently by LSU in 2017.

== Schedule ==
Date	Time	Opponent	Site	TV	Result	Attendance
September 1	6:00 p.m.	South Carolina State*	Paulson Stadium; Statesboro, GA	ESPN+	W 37–6	15,260
September 8	6:00 p.m.	UMass*	Paulson Stadium; Statesboro, GA	ESPN+	W 34–13	15,071
September 15	12:00 p.m.	at No. 2 Clemson*	Memorial Stadium; Clemson, SC	ESPNU	L 7–38	79,844
September 29	6:00 p.m.	Arkansas State	Paulson Stadium; Statesboro, GA	ESPN+	W 28–21	17,320
October 6	3:30 p.m.	South Alabama^{†}	Paulson Stadium; Statesboro, GA	ESPN3	W 48–13	17,622
October 11	7:30 p.m.	at Texas State	Bobcat Stadium; San Marcos, TX	ESPNU	W 15–13	9,545
October 20	6:00 p.m.	at New Mexico State*	Aggie Memorial Stadium; Las Cruces, NM		W 48–31	7,300
October 25	7:30 p.m.	No. 25 Appalachian State	Paulson Stadium; Statesboro, GA (rivalry)	ESPNU	W 34–14	19,252
November 3	3:00 p.m.	at Louisiana–Monroe	Malone Stadium; Monroe, LA	ESPN3	L 25–44	13,787
November 10	1:00 p.m.	Troy	Paulson Stadium; Statesboro, GA	ESPN+	L 21–35	16,289
November 17	5:00 p.m.	at Coastal Carolina	Brooks Stadium; Conway, SC	ESPN+	W 41–17	9,886
November 24	2:00 p.m.	at Georgia State	Georgia State Stadium; Atlanta, GA (rivalry)	ESPN+	W 35–14	20,011
December 15	5:30 p.m.	vs. Eastern Michigan*	Cramton Bowl; Montgomery, AL (Camellia Bowl)	ESPN	W 23–21	17,710
*Non-conference game; ^{†}Homecoming; Rankings from AP Poll released prior to the game; All times are in Eastern time

== Game summaries ==
=== South Carolina State ===
	1	2	3	4	Total
Bulldogs	0	0	6	0	6
Eagles	13	3	7	14	37

=== UMass ===
	1	2	3	4	Total
Minutemen	3	7	3	0	13
Eagles	0	17	10	7	34

=== At Clemson ===
	1	2	3	4	Total
Eagles	0	0	0	7	7
No. 2 Tigers	0	21	3	14	38

=== Arkansas State ===
	1	2	3	4	Total
Red Wolves	0	3	11	7	21
Eagles	0	7	7	14	28

=== South Alabama ===
	1	2	3	4	Total
Jaguars	0	6	0	7	13
Eagles	7	10	10	21	48

=== At Texas State ===
	1	2	3	4	Total
Eagles	0	10	5	0	15
Bobcats	0	0	7	6	13

=== At New Mexico State ===
	1	2	3	4	Total
Eagles	10	14	21	3	48
Aggies	14	3	7	7	31

=== Appalachian State ===
	1	2	3	4	Total
No. 25 Mountaineers	0	7	0	7	14
Eagles	0	17	10	7	34

=== At Louisiana–Monroe ===
Week Ten: Georgia Southern Eagles at Louisiana–Monroe Warhawks – Game summary

Quarter	1	2	3	4	Total
Eagles	0	10	8	7	25
Warhawks	13	14	14	3	44

at Malone Stadium • Monroe, LA

- Date: November 3
- Game time: 3:00 p.m. EST
- Game weather: 74° · Sunny · SW – 11 mph.
- Game attendance: 13,787
- Referee: Jeremy Parker
- TV: ESPN3

Game information

First quarter

- ULM - Caleb Evans 5-yard TD run, Craig Ford kick no good, 12:26 (ULM 6-0)
- ULM - Marcus Green 80-yard TD pass from Evans, Ford kick good, 6:43 (ULM 13-0)

Second quarter

- ULM - Green 69-yard TD pass from Evans, Ford kick good, 13:58 (ULM 20-0)
- GASO - Tyler Bass 38-yard field goal, 5:40 (ULM 20-3)
- ULM - Josh Johnson 1-yard TD run, Ford kick good, 2:49 (ULM 27-3)
- GASO - Mark Michaud 22-yard TD pass from Shai Werts, Bass kick good, 1:02 (ULM 27-10)

Third quarter

- ULM - Derrick Gore 1-yard TD run, Ford kick good, 6:31 (ULM 34-10)
- GASO - Jessie Liptrot 57-yard interception returned for TD, Wesley Field two-point conversion run good, 3:15 (ULM 34-18)
- ULM - Evans 2-yard TD run, Ford kick good, 0:14 (ULM 41-18)

Fourth quarter

- GASO - Benz Josue 5-yard returned block punt for TD, Bass kick good, 10:37 (ULM 41-25)
- ULM - Ford 32-yard field goal, 4:16 (ULM 44-25)

Leading Passers

- ULM - Caleb Evans - 13/22, 337 yards, 2 TD, 2 INT
- GASO - Shai Werts - 8/15, 78 yards, TD

Leading Rushers

- ULM - Derrick Gore - 19 carries, 114 yards, TD
- GASO - Wesley Fields - 17 carries, 73 yards

Leading Receivers

- ULM - Marcus Green - 2 receptions, 149 yards, 2 TD
- GASO - Davarius Bargnare - 3 receptions, 23 yards

=== Troy ===
	1	2	3	4	Total
Trojans	3	14	11	7	35
Eagles	14	0	0	7	21

=== At Coastal Carolina ===
	1	2	3	4	Total
Eagles	3	10	21	7	41
Chanticleers	7	3	0	7	17

=== At Georgia State ===
	1	2	3	4	Total
Eagles	0	13	15	7	35
Panthers	0	0	0	14	14

=== Vs. Eastern Michigan (Camellia Bowl) ===
	1	2	3	4	Total
EMU Eagles	0	7	7	7	21
GASO Eagles	7	10	0	6	23

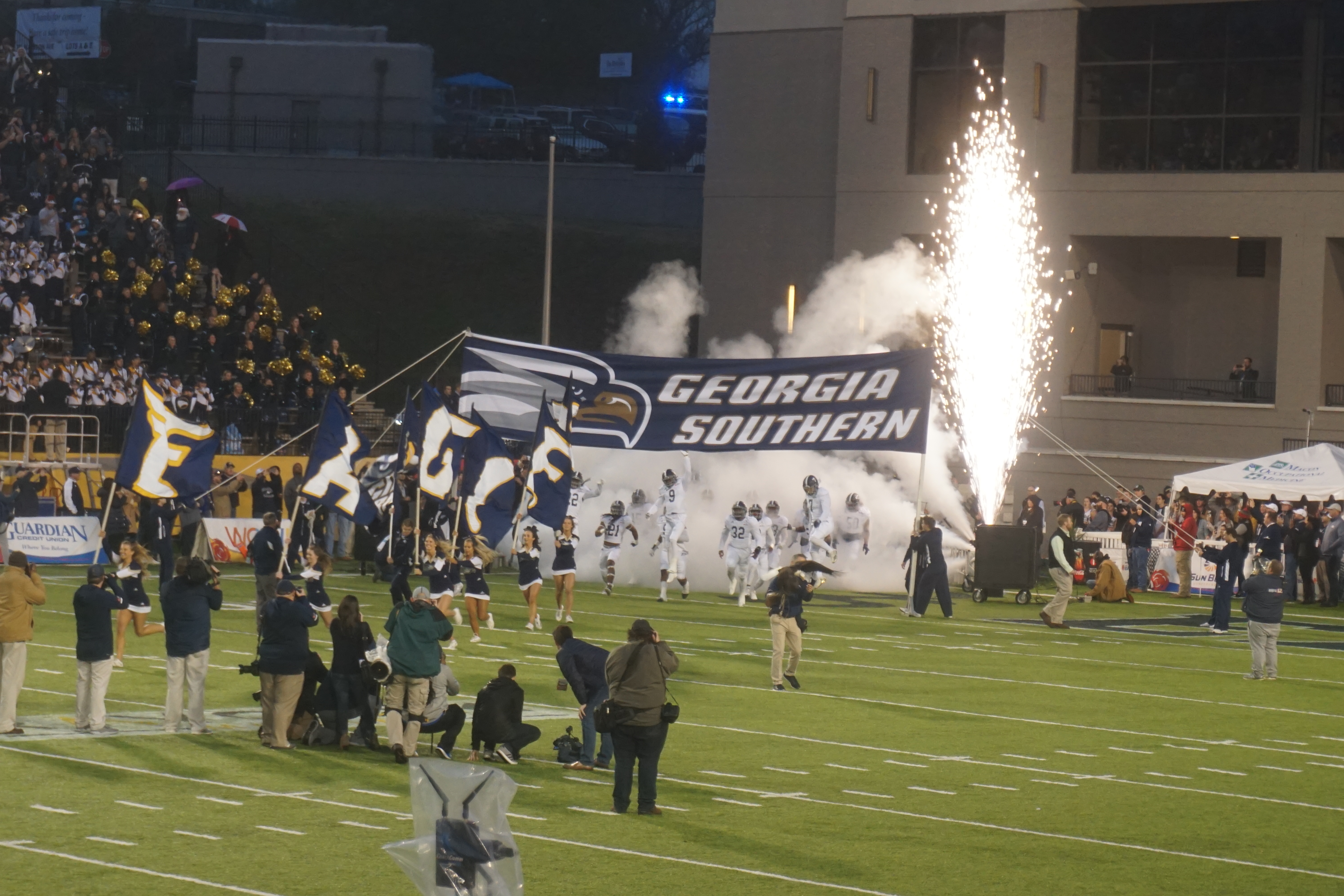
Georgia Southern taking the field before the 2018 Camellia Bowl

== Awards and honors ==
=== Preseason ===
==== Award watch lists ====
Listed in the order that they were released

Award	Player	Position	Year
Rimington Trophy	Curtis Rainey	C	SR
Doak Walker Award	Wesley Fields	RB	SR
John Mackey Award	Ellis Richardson	TE	SR
Lou Groza Award	Tyler Bass	K	JR
Wuerffel Trophy	Wesley Fields	RB	SR

==== Sun Belt coaches poll ====
On July 19, 2018, the Sun Belt released their preseason coaches poll with the Eagles predicted to finish in fourth place in the East Division.

==== Preseason All-Sun Belt Teams ====
The Eagles had six players selected to the preseason all-Sun Belt teams.

Offense

2nd team

Wesley Fields – RB

Ellis Richardson– TE

Curtis Rainey – OL

Defense

1st team

Logan Hunt – DL

Monquavion Brinson – DB Tae Hayes – DB

Special teams

2nd team

Tyler Bass – K

=== Post-season finalists and winners ===
==== All-Sun Belt Selections ====
Twelve Georgia Southern football players were honored by the league coaches and members of the media as the Sun Belt Conference announced the selections for its all-conference teams.

- Offensive Selection

Curtis Rainey - OL (First team)
Wesley Fields - RB (Second team)
Jeremiah Culbreth - OL (Second team)
Wesley Kennedy III - RB (Honorable mention)
Shai Werts - QB (Honorable mention)

- Defensive Selection

Kindle Vildor - DB (First team)
Raymond Johnson- DL (Second team)
Monquavion Brinson - DB (Second team)
Logan Hunt - DL (Third team)
Rashad Byrd - LB (Honorable mention)
Ty Phillips - DL (Honorable mention)

- Special Teams Selection

Tyler Bass - PK (First team)

per Sun Belt Conference
