= 2018 Arkansas State Red Wolves football team =

American college football season

2018 Arkansas State Red Wolves football

Sun Belt West Division co-champion

Arizona Bowl, L 13–16 ^{OT} vs. Nevada
- Conference: Sun Belt Conference
- West Division
- Record: 8–5 (5–3 Sun Belt)
- Head coach: Blake Anderson (5th season)
- Offensive coordinator: Buster Faulkner (3rd season)
- Offensive scheme: Spread
- Defensive coordinator: Joe Cauthen (5th season)
- Base defense: 4–2–5
- Home stadium: Centennial Bank Stadium

2018 Sun Belt Conference football standings
	Conf.			Overall
Team	W		L	W		L
East Division
Appalachian State xy$	7	–	1	11	–	2
Troy x	7	–	1	10	–	3
Georgia Southern	6	–	2	10	–	3
Coastal Carolina	2	–	6	5	–	7
Georgia State	1	–	7	2	–	10
West Division
Louisiana xy	5	–	3	7	–	7
Arkansas State x	5	–	3	8	–	5
Louisiana–Monroe	4	–	4	6	–	6
South Alabama	2	–	6	3	–	9
Texas State	1	–	7	3	–	9
Championship: Appalachian State 30, Louisiana 19
$ – Conference champion; x – Division champion/co-champions; y – Championship game participant

The 2018 Arkansas State Red Wolves football team represented Arkansas State University in the 2018 NCAA Division I FBS football season. The Red Wolves played their home games at Centennial Bank Stadium in Jonesboro, Arkansas, and competed in the West Division of the Sun Belt Conference. They were led by fifth-year head coach Blake Anderson.

== Preseason ==
=== Award watch lists ===
Listed in the order that they were released

Award	Player	Position	Year
Maxwell Award	Justice Hansen	QB	SR
Davey O'Brien Award	Justice Hansen	QB	SR
Doak Walker Award	Warren Wand	RB	SR
Jim Thorpe Award	Justin Clifton	DB	SR
Bronko Nagurski Trophy	Justin Clifton	DB	SR
Outland Trophy	Lanard Bonner	OL	SR
Ray Guy Award	Cody Grace	P	JR
Wuerffel Trophy	Justin Clifton	DB	SR
Wuerffel Trophy	Justice Hansen	QB	SR
Walter Camp Award	Justice Hansen	QB	SR
Johnny Unitas Golden Arm Award	Justice Hansen	QB	SR
Manning Award	Justice Hansen	QB	SR

=== Sun Belt coaches poll ===
On July 19, 2018, the Sun Belt released their preseason coaches poll with the Red Wolves predicted to finish as champions of the West Division. They were also predicted to win the Sun Belt Championship game.

=== Preseason All-Sun Belt Teams ===
The Red Wolves had nine players selected to the preseason all-Sun Belt teams. Quarterback Justice Hansen was selected as the preseason offensive player of the year.

Offense

1st team

Justice Hansen – QB

Warren Wand – RB

Justin McInnis – WR

Lanard Bonner– OL

2nd team

Jacob Still – OL

Defense

1st team

Ronheen Bingham – DL

Justin Clifton – DB

2nd team

BJ Edmonds – DB

Special teams

2nd team

Cody Grace – P

== Schedule ==
Date	Time	Opponent	Site	TV	Result	Attendance
September 1	6:00 p.m.	Southeast Missouri State*	Centennial Bank Stadium; Jonesboro, AR	ESPN+	W 48–21	20,184
September 8	2:30 p.m.	at No. 1 Alabama*	Bryant–Denny Stadium; Tuscaloosa, AL	ESPN2	L 7–57	100,495
September 15	6:00 p.m.	at Tulsa*	Chapman Stadium; Tulsa, OK	CBSSN	W 29–20	17,349
September 22	6:00 p.m.	UNLV*	Centennial Bank Stadium; Jonesboro, AR	ESPN3	W 27–20	18,537
September 29	5:00 p.m.	at Georgia Southern	Paulson Stadium; Statesboro, GA	ESPN+	L 21–28	17,320
October 9	6:00 p.m.	Appalachian State	Centennial Bank Stadium; Jonesboro, AR	ESPN2	L 9–35	21,421
October 18	6:30 p.m.	Georgia State	Centennial Bank Stadium; Jonesboro, AR	ESPNU	W 51–35	18,176
October 27	6:00 p.m.	at Louisiana	Cajun Field; Lafayette, LA	ESPN+	L 43–47	17,068
November 3	2:00 p.m.	South Alabama^{†}	Centennial Bank Stadium; Jonesboro, AR	ESPN+	W 38–14	20,671
November 10	4:00 p.m.	at Coastal Carolina	Brooks Stadium; Conway, SC	ESPN+	W 44–16	8,141
November 17	2:00 p.m.	Louisiana–Monroe	Centennial Bank Stadium; Jonesboro, AR	ESPN+	W 31–17	20,012
November 24	3:00 p.m.	at Texas State	Bobcat Stadium; San Marcos, TX	ESPN3	W 33–7	10,115
December 29	12:15 p.m.	vs. Nevada*	Arizona Stadium; Tucson, AZ (Arizona Bowl)	CBSSN	L 13–16 ^{OT}	32,368
*Non-conference game; ^{†}Homecoming; Rankings from AP Poll released prior to the game; All times are in Central time

Schedule source:

== Game summaries ==
=== Southeast Missouri State ===
	1	2	3	4	Total
Redhawks	0	14	0	7	21
Red Wolves	7	14	27	0	48

=== At Alabama ===
	1	2	3	4	Total
Red Wolves	0	0	7	0	7
No. 1 Crimson Tide	19	21	10	7	57

=== At Tulsa ===
	1	2	3	4	Total
Red Wolves	3	10	14	2	29
Golden Hurricane	7	0	3	10	20

=== UNLV ===
	1	2	3	4	Total
Rebels	7	0	13	0	20
Red Wolves	6	7	6	8	27

=== At Georgia Southern ===
	1	2	3	4	Total
Red Wolves	0	3	11	7	21
Eagles	0	7	7	14	28

=== Appalachian State ===
	1	2	3	4	Total
Mountaineers	0	21	7	7	35
Red Wolves	3	6	0	0	9

=== Georgia State ===
	1	2	3	4	Total
Panthers	7	0	14	14	35
Red Wolves	20	14	7	10	51

=== At Louisiana ===
	1	2	3	4	Total
Red Wolves	14	7	7	15	43
Ragin' Cajuns	21	10	3	13	47

=== South Alabama ===
	1	2	3	4	Total
Jaguars	0	7	0	7	14
Red Wolves	0	14	14	10	38

=== At Coastal Carolina ===
	1	2	3	4	Total
Red Wolves	14	13	14	3	44
Chanticleers	0	6	7	3	16

=== Louisiana–Monroe ===
Week Twelve: Louisiana–Monroe Warhawks at Arkansas State Red Wolves – Game summary

Quarter	1	2	3	4	Total
Warhawks	0	7	10	0	17
Red Wolves	7	10	14	0	31

at Centennial Bank Stadium • Jonesboro, Arkansas

- Date: November 17
- Game time: 2:00 p.m. CST
- Game weather: 66° · Sunny · S – 9 mph.
- Game attendance: 20,012
- Referee: Jeremy Parker
- TV: ESPN+

Game information

First quarter

- ARST - Kirk Merritt 49-yard TD pass from Justice Hansen, Blake Grupe kick good, 4:41 (ARST 7-0)

Second quarter

- ARST - Blake Grupe 26-yard field goal, 7:58 (ARST 10-0)
- ULM - Josh Pederson 34-yard TD pass from Caleb Evans, Craig Ford kick good, 5:25 (ARST 10-7)
- ARST - Merritt 7-yard TD pass from Hansen, Blake Grupe kick good, 0:31 (ARST 17-7)

Third quarter

- ARST - Justin Clifton 43-yard interception returned for TD, Blake Grupe kick good, 11:58 (ARST 24-7)
- ULM - Caleb Evans 1-yard TD run, Craig Ford kick good, 9:31 (ARST 24-14)
- ULM - Craig Ford 37-yard field goal, 5:23 (ARST 24-17)
- ARST - Justin McInnis 10-yard TD pass from Hansen, Blake Grupe kick good, 0:40 (ARST 31-17)

Leading Passers

- ARST - Justice Hansen - 21/27, 246 yards, 3 TD
- ULM - Caleb Evans - 17/28, 218 yards, TD, 3 INT

Leading Rushers

- ARST - Marcel Murray - 17 carries, 94 yards
- ULM - Caleb Evans - 14 carries, 34 yards, TD

Leading Receivers

- ARST - Kirk Merritt - 6 receptions, 89 yards, 3 TD
- ULM - Marcus Green - 5 receptions, 69 yards

=== At Texas State ===
	1	2	3	4	Total
Red Wolves	7	0	21	5	33
Bobcats	0	0	7	0	7

=== Vs. Nevada (Arizona Bowl) ===
	1	2	3	4	OT	Total
Wolf Pack	0	3	0	7	6	16
Red Wolves	0	7	0	3	3	13
