= 2018 Troy Trojans football team =

American college football season

2018 Troy Trojans football

Sun Belt East Division co-champion Dollar General Bowl champion

Dollar General Bowl, W 42–32 vs. Buffalo
- Conference: Sun Belt Conference
- East Division
- Record: 10–3 (7–1 Sun Belt)
- Head coach: Neal Brown (4th season)
- Co-offensive coordinators: Matt Moore (3rd season); Sean Reagan (1st season)
- Offensive scheme: Spread
- Defensive coordinator: Vic Koenning (6th season)
- Base defense: 3–3–5
- Home stadium: Veterans Memorial Stadium

2018 Sun Belt Conference football standings
	Conf.			Overall
Team	W		L	W		L
East Division
Appalachian State xy$	7	–	1	11	–	2
Troy x	7	–	1	10	–	3
Georgia Southern	6	–	2	10	–	3
Coastal Carolina	2	–	6	5	–	7
Georgia State	1	–	7	2	–	10
West Division
Louisiana xy	5	–	3	7	–	7
Arkansas State x	5	–	3	8	–	5
Louisiana–Monroe	4	–	4	6	–	6
South Alabama	2	–	6	3	–	9
Texas State	1	–	7	3	–	9
Championship: Appalachian State 30, Louisiana 19
$ – Conference champion; x – Division champion/co-champions; y – Championship game participant

The 2018 Troy Trojans football team represented Troy University in the 2018 NCAA Division I FBS football season. The Trojans played their home games at Veterans Memorial Stadium in Troy, Alabama, and competed in the East Division of the Sun Belt Conference. They were led by fourth-year head coach Neal Brown. They finished the season 10–3, 7–1 in Sun Belt play to finish in a tie for the East Division championship with Appalachian State. Due to their head-to-head loss to Appalachian State, they did not represent the East Division in the Sun Belt Championship Game. They were invited to the Dollar General Bowl where they defeated Buffalo.

Head coach Neal Brown left at the conclusion of the season to become the head coach at West Virginia. On January 10, 2019, the school hired Kansas coordinator Chip Lindsey as head coach.

== Preseason ==
=== Award watch lists ===
Listed in the order that they were released

Award	Player	Position	Year
Rimington Trophy	Deontae Crumitie	C	SR
Jim Thorpe Award	Blace Brown	CB	SR
Bronko Nagurski Trophy	Blace Brown	CB	SR
Bronko Nagurski Trophy	Hunter Reese	DE	SR
Outland Trophy	Deontae Crumitie	C	SR
Paul Hornung Award	Marcus Jones	CB/KR	SO
Wuerffel Trophy	Damion Willis	WR	SR

=== Sun Belt coaches poll ===
On July 19, 2018, the Sun Belt released their preseason coaches poll with the Trojans predicted to finish in second place in the East Division.

=== Preseason All-Sun Belt Teams ===
The Trojans had ten players at eleven positions selected to the preseason all-Sun Belt teams.

Offense

1st team

Tristan Crowder – OL

Deontae Crumitie – OL

2nd team

Deondre Douglas – WR

Defense

1st team

Hunter Reese – DL

Trevon Sanders – DL

Tron Folsom – LB

Blace Brown – DB

2nd team

Marcus Webb – DL

Marcus Jones – DB

Cedarius Rookard – DB

Special teams

2nd team

Marcus Jones – KR

== Schedule ==
Date	Time	Opponent	Site	TV	Result	Attendance
September 1	5:00 p.m.	No. 22 Boise State*	Veterans Memorial Stadium; Troy, AL	ESPNews	L 20–56	29,612
September 8	6:00 p.m.	Florida A&M*	Veterans Memorial Stadium; Troy, AL	ESPN+	W 59–7	25,767
September 15	11:00 a.m.	at Nebraska*	Memorial Stadium; Lincoln, NE	BTN	W 24–19	89,360
September 22	6:00 p.m.	at Louisiana–Monroe	Malone Stadium; Monroe, LA	ESPN+	W 35–27	15,722
September 29	2:30 p.m.	Coastal Carolina	Veterans Memorial Stadium; Troy, AL	ESPN+	W 45–21	23,810
October 4	6:30 p.m.	Georgia State	Veterans Memorial Stadium; Troy, AL	ESPNU	W 37–20	22,903
October 13	1:00 p.m.	at Liberty*	Williams Stadium; Lynchburg, VA	ESPN3	L 16–22	17,389
October 23	7:00 p.m.	at South Alabama	Ladd–Peebles Stadium; Mobile, AL (rivalry)	ESPN2	W 38–17	25,878
November 3	2:30 p.m.	Louisiana	Veterans Memorial Stadium; Troy, AL	ESPN+	W 26–16	24,631
November 10	12:00 p.m.	at Georgia Southern	Paulson Stadium; Statesboro, GA	ESPN+	W 35–21	16,289
November 17	2:30 p.m.	Texas State	Veterans Memorial Stadium; Troy, AL	ESPN+	W 12–7	20,437
November 24	1:30 p.m.	at Appalachian State	Kidd Brewer Stadium; Boone, NC	ESPN+	L 10–21	20,410
December 22	6:00 p.m.	vs. Buffalo*	Ladd–Peebles Stadium; Mobile, AL (Dollar General Bowl)	ESPN	W 42–32	31,818
*Non-conference game; Rankings from AP Poll released prior to the game; All times are in Central time

== Game summaries ==
=== Boise State ===
	1	2	3	4	Total
No. 22 Broncos	14	21	7	14	56
Trojans	7	0	7	6	20

=== Florida A&M ===
	1	2	3	4	Total
Rattlers	0	7	0	0	7
Trojans	21	17	14	7	59

=== At Nebraska ===
	1	2	3	4	Total
Trojans	3	14	0	7	24
Cornhuskers	0	7	6	6	19

=== At Louisiana–Monroe ===
Week Four: Troy Trojans at Louisiana–Monroe Warhawks – Game summary

Quarter	1	2	3	4	Total
Trojans	7	28	0	0	35
Warhawks	7	0	7	13	27

at Malone Stadium • Monroe, LA

- Date: September 22
- Game time: 6:00 p.m. CDT
- Game weather: 75° · Cloudy; light rain · ENE – 3 mph.
- Game attendance: 15,722
- Referee: Kyle Olson
- TV: ESPN+

Game information

First quarter

- ULM - Derrick Gore 1-yard TD run, Craig Ford kick good, 8:32 (ULM 7-0)
- TROY - Kaleb Barker 19-yard TD run, Tyler Sumpter kick good, 7:00 (TIE 7-7)

Second quarter

- TROY - Barker 2-yard TD run, Sumpter kick good, 13:51 (TROY 14-7)
- TROY - Damion Willis 26-yard TD pass from Sawyer Smith, Sumpter kick good, 10:23 (TROY 21-7)
- TROY - Willis 4-yard TD pass from Barker, Sumpter kick good, 2:20 (TROY 28-7)
- TROY - Sidney Davis 22-yard TD pass from Barker, Sumpter kick good, 0:42 (TROY 35-7)

Third quarter

- ULM - Kayin White 2-yard TD run, Ford kick good, 5:17 (TROY 35-14)

Fourth quarter

- ULM - Slaon Spiller 4-yard TD pass from Caleb Evans, Ford kick good, 14:22 (TROY 35-21)
- ULM - Josh Pederson 23-yard TD pass from Evan, Ford kick no good, 6:18 (TROY 35-27)

Leading Passers

- TROY - Kaleb Barker - 23/28, 273 yards, 2 TD
- ULM - Caleb Evans - 29/48, 290 yards, 2 TD, INT

Leading Rushers

- TROY - B. J. Smith - 16 carries, 63 yards
- ULM - Caleb Evans - 15 carries, 101 yards

Leading Receivers

- TROY - Sloan Davis - 6 receptions, 78 yards, TD
- ULM - Xavier Brown - 2 receptions, 59 yards

=== Coastal Carolina ===
	1	2	3	4	Total
Chanticleers	0	14	7	0	21
Trojans	21	3	14	7	45

=== Georgia State ===
	1	2	3	4	Total
Panthers	0	3	3	14	20
Trojans	14	9	0	14	37

=== At Liberty ===
	1	2	3	4	Total
Trojans	7	3	3	3	16
Flames	0	14	0	8	22

=== At South Alabama ===
	1	2	3	4	Total
Trojans	16	15	0	7	38
Jaguars	7	10	0	0	17

=== Louisiana ===
	1	2	3	4	Total
Ragin' Cajuns	3	0	13	0	16
Trojans	10	13	3	0	26

=== At Georgia Southern ===
	1	2	3	4	Total
Trojans	3	14	11	7	35
Eagles	14	0	0	7	21

=== Texas State ===
	1	2	3	4	Total
Bobcats	0	0	0	7	7
Trojans	3	6	0	3	12

=== At Appalachian State ===
	1	2	3	4	Total
Trojans	0	3	7	0	10
Mountaineers	7	14	0	0	21

=== Vs. Buffalo (Dollar General Bowl) ===
	1	2	3	4	Total
Bulls	7	10	7	8	32
Trojans	7	7	7	21	42
