= 2018 Sun Belt Conference Football Championship Game =

- 1st Sun Belt Championship Game
Louisiana Ragin' Cajuns	Appalachian State Mountaineers
(7–5)	(9–2)
19	30
Head coach: Billy Napier	Head coach: Scott Satterfield
	1	2	3	4	Total
Louisiana	3	3	10	3	19
Appalachian State	7	7	6	10	30
- Date: December 1, 2018
- Season: 2018
- Stadium: Kidd Brewer Stadium
- Location: Boone, North Carolina
- MVP: RB Darrynton Evans, App State
- Favorite: Appalachian State –19
- Referee: Ted Pitts
- Attendance: 14,963

United States TV coverage
- Network: ESPN
- Announcers: Jason Benetti (Play-By-Play); Kelly Stouffer (Analyst); Olivia Dekker (Sidelines)

2018 Sun Belt Conference football standings
	Conf.			Overall
Team	W		L	W		L
East Division
Appalachian State xy$	7	–	1	11	–	2
Troy x	7	–	1	10	–	3
Georgia Southern	6	–	2	10	–	3
Coastal Carolina	2	–	6	5	–	7
Georgia State	1	–	7	2	–	10
West Division
Louisiana xy	5	–	3	7	–	7
Arkansas State x	5	–	3	8	–	5
Louisiana–Monroe	4	–	4	6	–	6
South Alabama	2	–	6	3	–	9
Texas State	1	–	7	3	–	9
Championship: Appalachian State 30, Louisiana 19
$ – Conference champion; x – Division champion/co-champions; y – Championship game participant

The 2018 Sun Belt Conference Championship Game was played on December 1, 2018, between the Mountaineers of Appalachian State and the Ragin' Cajuns from Louisiana. The game was played at Kidd Brewer Stadium in Boone, North Carolina, due to Appalachian State's better conference record. This was the second time these teams played this year; the first meeting finished 27–17 in the Mountaineers' favor. The winner of the game would play in the R+L Carriers New Orleans Bowl while the loser would play in the Cure Bowl.

== History ==
In 1987, the National Collegiate Athletic Association (NCAA) approved a proposal made by two Division II conferences that allowed any conference with 12 football members to split into divisions and stage a championship game between the divisional winners, with that game not counting against NCAA limits on regular-season contests. However, the rule would not see its first use until 1992, when the Southeastern Conference, which had added Arkansas and South Carolina the previous year, launched its title game. In early 2016, NCAA legislation was passed that largely deregulated FBS conference championship games, allowing a conference with fewer than 12 teams to stage a championship game that featured either (1) the top two teams at the end of a full round-robin conference schedule, or (2) the winners of each of two divisions, with each team playing a full round-robin schedule within its division. Several months later the Sun Belt Conference announced that they would be introducing the football championship game to its sponsor sport starting in 2018.

In 2017, the conference announced that its teams would compete in two divisions, to determine participants for a conference championship game. The East and West divisions were created with five teams each, with the top teams to meet in a championship game played at the home stadium of the team with the best College Football Playoff ranking. If neither team was ranked in the CFP selection committee, the conference would determine home field using a formula based on six computer ratings that were used in the old Bowl Championship Series standings.

== Teams ==
=== Louisiana ===
The Ragin' Cajuns came into the 2018 season off of a 5–7 record. They also entered the season to a new face, Billy Napier, after previous head coach, Mark Hudspeth had been fired after three consecutive years of shortcomings and four consecutive New Orleans Bowl victories. Hoping to capitalize on a new face, the Cajuns did just that finishing 7–5 and in the Conference Championship after finishing first in the West Division, but only finishing in a tie for fourth place in the entire conference. The Ragin' Cajun come into the game after beating out-of-conference Grambling State Tigers and the New Mexico State Aggies and Sun Belt Conference foes Texas State Bobcats, Arkansas State Red Wolves, Georgia State Panthers, South Alabama Jaguars, and the winner-take-all game against the Louisiana-Monroe Warhawks. The Ragin' Cajuns were defeated by No. 16 Mississippi State Bulldogs, Coastal Carolina Chanticleers, No. 1 Alabama Crimson Tide, Appalachian State Mountaineers, and the Troy Trojans.

=== Appalachian State ===
The Mountaineers came into the 2018 season off of a 9–4 season, a Sun Belt Co-Championship, and a Dollar General Bowl victory and shut out 34-0, against the Toledo Rockets. Since coming into the Sun Belt Conference in 2014, the Mountaineers have flourished, finishing every year above .500, two conference championships, two Camellia Bowl wins, a Dollar General Bowl win, and even ranked No. 25 in the nation for a week in 2018, which was the first time in the programs history. The Mountaineers come into the game after beating out-of-conference Charlotte 49ers, Gardner–Webb Runnin' Bulldogs, and Sun Belt foes South Alabama Jaguars, Arkansas State Red Wolves, Louisiana Ragin' Cajuns, Coastal Carolina Chanticleers, Texas State Bobcats, Georgia State Panthers, and the winner-take-all game against the Troy Trojans. Their only losses of 2018 were to No. 10 Penn State Nittany Lions and the Georgia Southern Eagles.

=== Appalachian State vs. Louisiana series history ===
This match up was the 6th all time meeting against the Mountaineers and the Ragin' Cajuns. They last played each other earlier this year on October 20. Appalachian State defeated Louisiana, 27-17. That win made it five in the row, leading to the Mountaineers first appearance in the AP Poll. After the regular season match up, Appalachian State leads the all time series 5-0.

== Game summary ==
2018 Sun Belt Conference Football Championship Game

Quarter	1	2	3	4	Total
Louisiana	3	3	10	3	19
Appalachian State	7	7	6	10	30

at Kidd Brewer Stadium, Boone, North Carolina

- Date: Saturday, December 1, 2018
- Game time: 12:00 p.m. EST
- Game attendance: 14,963
- Referee: Ted Pitts
- TV announcers (ESPN): Jason Benetti (play-by-play), Kelly Stouffer (analyst) and Olivia Dekker (sideline)
- ESPN game summary

Scoring summary

Quarter	Time	Drive			Team	Scoring information	Score	
Quarter	Time	Plays	Yards	TOP	Team	Scoring information	LA	APP
1	10:13	9	55	4:47	LA	37-yard field goal by Kyle Pfau	3	0
1	9:56	1	1	0:04	APP	Marcus Williams Jr. 1-yard touchdown run, Chandler Staton kick good	3	7
2	8:17	11	41	5:19	LA	45-yard field goal by Kyle Pfau	6	7
2	3:17	9	75	5:00	APP	Zac Thomas 25-yard touchdown run, Chandler Staton kick good	6	14
3	12:19	6	51	2:41	APP	24-yard field goal by Chandler Staton	6	17
3	10:34	4	36	1:35	LA	Andre Nunez 8-yard touchdown run, Kyle Pfau kick good	13	17
3	5:00	7	28	3:24	LA	23-yard field goal by Kyle Pfau	16	17
3	0:00	10	52	4:56	APP	42-yard field goal by Chandler Staton	16	20
4	11:43	4	44	1:32	APP	Zac Thomas 35-yard touchdown run, Chandler Staton kick good	16	27
4	6:01	12	60	5:36	LA	24-yard field goal by Kyle Pfau	19	27
4	2:09	7	50	3:52	APP	43-yard field goal by Chandler Staton	19	30
"TOP" = time of possession. For other American football terms, see Glossary of American football.							19	30

=== Statistics ===
	1	2	3	4	Total
Ragin' Cajuns	3	3	10	3	19
Mountaineers	7	7	6	10	30

Statistics	LA	APP
First downs	16	13
Plays–yards	66–301	57–300
Rushes–yards	44–216	44–225
Passing yards	85	75
Passing: Comp–Att–Int	10–22–2	6–13–0
Time of possession	31:24	28:30

Team	Category	Player	Statistics
Louisiana	Passing	Andre Nunez	10/21, 85 yds, 2 INT
Louisiana	Rushing	Trey Ragas	16 car, 101 yds
Louisiana	Receiving	Ja'Marcus Bradley	4 rec, 41 yds
Appalachian State	Passing	Zac Thomas	6/13, 75 yds
Appalachian State	Rushing	Darrynton Evans	17 car, 111 yds
Appalachian State	Receiving	Corey Sutton	2 rec, 23 yds
