= Chris Woods (American football coach) =

American football coach

Current position
- Title: Linebackers coach
- Team: Ohio

Playing career
- 1987–1990: Davidson

Coaching career (HC unless noted)
- 1994–1995: Plymouth State (OL)
- 1996–1999: Wittenberg (DC/LB)
- 2001–2003: Mansfield
- 2004–2006: Stonehill
- 2007: Harvard (LB/ST)
- 2008–2010: Bryant (DL/ST)
- 2011: Columbia (DC/LB)
- 2012–2014: Holmes (DC)
- 2015–2017: Oklahoma (def. spec.)
- 2018: Texas State (interim HC/DC)
- 2020: Dallas Renegades (DC)
- 2020–2021: Kansas (sr. def. asst.)
- 2022–2024: Temple (LB)
- 2025–2025: Arlington Renegades (LB)
- 2025–present: Ohio (LB)

Head coaching record
- Overall: 18–33

Christopher Woods is an American football coach. He is the linebackers coach for the Ohio Bobcats. Prior to that was the linebackers coach for the Arlington Renegades of the United Football League (UFL) and the defensive coordinator for the Dallas Renegades of the newly-formed XFL. Wood served as the head football coach at Mansfield University of Pennsylvania from 2001 to 2003 and Stonehill College from 2004 to 2006. He was the interim head football coach at Texas State University for the final game of the 2018 season.

== Head coaching record ==
Woods has coached during the following seasons.

=== College ===
| Year | Team | Overall | Conference | Standing |
|---|---|---|---|---|
Mansfield Mountaineers (Pennsylvania State Athletic Conference) (2001–2003)
| 2001 | Mansfield | 2–8 | 1–5 | 6th (East) |
| 2002 | Mansfield | 3–7 | 2–4 | T–5th (East) |
| 2003 | Mansfield | 8–3 | 3–3 | 4th (East) |
| Mansfield: | | 13–18 | 6–12 | |
Stonehill Skyhawks (Northeast-10 Conference) (2005–2006)
| 2005 | Stonehill | 4–6 | 4–5 | 6th |
| 2006 | Stonehill | 1–9 | 1–8 | 9th |
| Stonehill: | | 5–15 | 5–13 | |
Texas State Bobcats (Sun Belt Conference) (2018)
| 2018 | Texas State | 0–1 | 0–1 | 5th (West) |
| Texas State: | | 0–1 | 0–1 | |
| Total: | | 18–34 | | |
