= RaJae' Johnson =

American gridiron football player (born 1998)

No. 85
- Position: Wide receiver

Personal information
- Born: October 4, 1998 (age 28); St. Louis, Missouri, U.S.
- Listed height: 6 ft 4 in (1.93 m)
- Listed weight: 220 lb (100 kg)

Career information
- High school: Jennings (MO)
- College: San Mateo; UAB; Troy

Career history
- 2023: Toronto Argonauts
- Stats at CFL.ca

RaJae' Johnson-Sanders (born October 4, 1998) is an American former professional football wide receiver who played for the Toronto Argonauts of the Canadian Football League (CFL). He played college football at San Mateo, UAB and Troy.

== Early life ==
RaJae' Johnson-Sanders played high school football at Jennings High School in Jennings, Missouri and earned first team all-conference honors as a running back. He also earned all-conference honors as a forward in basketball.

== College career ==
Johnson first played college football at the College of San Mateo from 2017 to 2018. He played in 13 games his freshman year in 2017, recording 56 receptions for 1,385 yards and 14 touchdowns as a wide receiver. He appeared in three games in 2018, catching 12 passes for 113 yards and one touchdown.

Johnson transferred to play for UAB from 2019 to 2021. He was redshirted in 2019. He played in eight games in 2020, catching two passes for 20 yards. Johnson appeared in 12 games, starting nine, in 2021, totaling 23 receptions for 394 yards and one touchdown.

Johnson transferred to play at Troy in 2022. He played in 14 games, catching 36 passes for 713 yards and seven touchdowns.

== Professional career ==
Johnson was signed by the Toronto Argonauts of the Canadian Football League (CFL) on May 22, 2023. He was placed on the reserve/suspended list on June 3, moved to the practice roster on July 24, and placed on injured reserve on September 28, 2023. Overall, he played in one game, a start, in 2023, catching one pass for 17 yards. Johnson was released on May 15, 2024.
