= Eman Naghavi =

American football coach (born 1987)

Current position
- Title: Offensive line coach
- Team: Houston
- Conference: Big 12

Biographical details
- Born: May 11, 1987 (age 39); Katy, Texas, U.S.

Playing career
- 2005–2008: McNeese State
- Position: Offensive line

Coaching career (HC unless noted)
- 2011–2012: McNeese State (OL/TE)
- 2013–2014: Texas (off. quality control)
- 2015–2016: McNeese State (OL)
- 2017–2019: Louisiana–Monroe (OL)
- 2020: Louisiana–Monroe (OC)
- 2021: Georgia State (OL)
- 2022: Tulane (OL)
- 2023: Houston (OC/OL)
- 2024–present: Houston (OL)

Eman Naghavi (born May 11, 1987) is an American football coach who is the offensive line coach for the Houston Cougars.

== Playing career ==
Naghavi played four years at McNeese State. In those four years he started in 36 games, racking up lots of honors being named First-team All-Southland three times, and being named an FCS All-American in 2008.

== Coaching career ==
Naghavi started his coaching career at McNeese State as their offensive line and tight ends coach. From there he would become an offensive quality control coach for the Texas Longhorns for two seasons. He would then return to McNeese State as their offensive line coach, where he would stay for two seasons. Then he would get his first FBS offensive line coaching position at Louisiana–Monroe in 2017, a position he would hold until 2019. Then in 2020 he was promoted to be the offensive coordinator for Louisiana-Monroe. However, after just one season as the offensive coordinator at Louisiana-Monroe, he left for the Georgia State Panthers to become their offensive line coach. After one season with the panthers he would leave for the offensive line coaching position at Tulane. In his one season at Tulane he helped lead them to a Cotton Bowl win against USC. He would then be hired by the Houston Cougars to be their co-offensive coordinator and offensive line coach.
