= Sun Belt Conference Football Championship Game =

College football championship

- Sport: Football
- Conference: Sun Belt
- Played: 2018–present
- Last contest: 2025
- Current champion: James Madison
- Most championships: Appalachian State; Troy (2)
- TV partner: ESPN
- Official website: Official site

Sponsors
- Hercules Tires (2021–present)

Host stadiums
- Kidd Brewer Stadium, Cajun Field, Veterans Memorial

The Sun Belt Conference Football Championship Game is an annual college football game that determines the season champion of the Sun Belt Conference (SBC). The game is played between the SBC regular-season divisional champions from the East and West divisions. First contested in 2018, the game is typically played on the first Saturday of December. The current champion are the James Madison Dukes.

== History ==
– East Division
– West Division

In 1987, the National Collegiate Athletic Association (NCAA) approved a proposal made by two Division II conferences that allowed any conference with 12 football members to split into divisions and stage a championship game between the divisional winners, with that game not counting against NCAA limits on regular-season contests. However, the rule would not see its first use until 1992, when the Southeastern Conference, which had added Arkansas and South Carolina the previous year, launched its title game. In early 2016, NCAA legislation was passed that largely deregulated FBS conference championship games, allowing a conference with fewer than 12 teams to stage a championship game that featured either (1) the top two teams at the end of a full round-robin conference schedule, or (2) the winners of each of two divisions, with each team playing a full round-robin schedule within its division. Several months later, the Sun Belt Conference announced that they would be introducing a football championship game starting in the 2018 season.

In 2017, the conference announced the two divisions that teams would compete in, with division winners qualifying for the championship game. As the conference would have 10 teams competing in football in the 2018 season, East and West divisions were created with five teams each, with the championship game to be played at the home stadium of the team with the best College Football Playoff ranking. If no teams are ranked in the CFP selection committee, the conference will determine home field using a formula based on six computer ratings that were used in the old Bowl Championship Series standings. Unlike the conference's sports of baseball and volleyball, which are also divided into divisions, the Jaguars of South Alabama competed in the West division rather than the East.

In 2018, Appalachian State qualified as the East division team, as they had defeated Troy head-to-head, with both teams finishing the regular season with 7–1 conference records. Louisiana qualified as the West division team, as they had defeated Arkansas State head-to-head, with both teams finishing the regular season with 5–3 conference records. In the inaugural championship game, Appalachian State defeated Louisiana, 30–19. The 2019 game was a rematch of the same teams, and again saw Appalachian State defeat Louisiana, this time by a score of 45–38.

The 2020 championship game, set to feature Coastal Carolina and Louisiana, was canceled due to COVID-19 pandemic effects within the Coastal Carolina program. As a result, the teams were declared co-champions for the 2020 season.

The 2021 game saw Louisiana and Appalachian State in the title game for the third time; however, unlike their prior two championship meetings at Kidd Brewer Stadium, Louisiana won over Appalachian State 24–16 at Cajun Field for their first outright Sun Belt Conference title.

With the addition of four new members in 2022—James Madison, Marshall, Old Dominion, and Southern Miss—the SBC adopted a new alignment for all divisional sports, with the new dividing line being the Alabama–Georgia border. Accordingly, James Madison, Marshall, and Old Dominion joined the East Division, with Southern Miss joining the West Division. Troy moved from the East to the West.

Since the 2024 season, the SBC has been the only FBS conference to use a divisional alignment in football. The other three conferences that had a divisional alignment in the 2023 season—the Big Ten, MAC, and SEC—eliminated their divisions after that season.

== Results by year ==
Below are the results from all Sun Belt Conference Football Championship Games played. The winning team appears in bold font, on a background of their primary team color. Rankings are from the College Football Playoff committee ranking released prior to the game.

| Year | West Division | | East Division | | Site | Attendance | MVP |
|---|---|---|---|---|---|---|---|
| 2018 | Louisiana | 19 | **Appalachian State** | **30** | Kidd Brewer Stadium • Boone, North Carolina | 14,693 | RB Darrynton Evans, App State |
| 2019 | Louisiana | 38 | 21 **Appalachian State** | **45** | Kidd Brewer Stadium • Boone, North Carolina | 18,618 | RB Darrynton Evans, App State |
| 2020† | 19 Louisiana | – | 12 Coastal Carolina | – | Brooks Stadium • Conway, South Carolina | – | – |
| 2021 | **24 Louisiana** | **24** | Appalachian State | 16 | Cajun Field • Lafayette, Louisiana | 31,014 | QB Levi Lewis, Louisiana |
| 2022 | **Troy** | **45** | Coastal Carolina | 26 | Veterans Memorial Stadium • Troy, Alabama | 21,554 | QB Gunnar Watson, Troy |
| 2023 | **Troy** | **49** | Appalachian State | 23 | Veterans Memorial Stadium • Troy, Alabama | 20,183 | RB Kimani Vidal, Troy |
| 2024 | Louisiana | 3 | **Marshall** | **31** | Cajun Field • Lafayette, Louisiana | 20,067 | QB Braylon Braxton, Marshall |
| 2025 | Troy | 14 | 25 **James Madison** | **31** | Bridgeforth Stadium • Harrisonburg, Virginia | 19,836 | RB Wayne Knight |
| 2026 | Louisiana Tech | | | | | | |

† The 2020 game was canceled by Coastal Carolina due to COVID-19 issues.

=== Results by team ===
| Selections | School | Wins | Losses | Win % | Year(s) won | Year(s) lost | No contest |
|---|---|---|---|---|---|---|---|
| 5 | Louisiana | 1 | 3 | .250 | 2021 | 2018, 2019, 2024 | 2020 |
| 4 | Appalachian State | 2 | 2 | .500 | 2018, 2019 | 2021, 2023 | —N/a |
| 3 | Troy | 2 | 1 | .667 | 2022, 2023 | 2025 | —N/a |
| 2 | Coastal Carolina | 0 | 1 | .000 | —N/a | 2022 | 2020 |
| 1 | Marshall | 1 | 0 | 1.000 | 2024 | —N/a | —N/a |
| 1 | James Madison | 1 | 0 | 1.000 | 2025 | —N/a | —N/a |
| 1 | Louisiana Tech | 0 | 0 | – | —N/a | —N/a | |
| 0 | Arkansas State | 0 | 0 | – | —N/a | —N/a | —N/a |
| 0 | Georgia Southern | 0 | 0 | – | —N/a | —N/a | —N/a |
| 0 | Georgia State | 0 | 0 | – | —N/a | —N/a | —N/a |
| 0 | Louisiana–Monroe | 0 | 0 | – | —N/a | —N/a | —N/a |
| 0 | Old Dominion | 0 | 0 | – | —N/a | —N/a | —N/a |
| 0 | South Alabama | 0 | 0 | – | —N/a | —N/a | —N/a |
| 0 | Southern Miss | 0 | 0 | – | —N/a | —N/a | —N/a |

=== Rematches ===
The Sun Belt Conference Football Championship game has featured a rematch of a regular-season game a total of three times (2018, 2019, 2021). The team which won the regular-season game is 3–0 in the rematches.

=== No results by team ===
School
Texas State

- Arkansas State, Georgia Southern, Georgia State, Louisiana–Monroe, Old Dominion, South Alabama, and Southern Miss have yet to earn a Sun Belt Football Championship Game bid.
- Texas State did not make an appearance in a Sun Belt Conference Championship Game while a member of the conference (2013–2025).

== Game records ==
| Team | Record, Team vs. Opponent | Year |
|---|---|---|
| Most points scored (one team) | 49, Troy vs. Appalachian State | 2023 |
| Most points scored (losing team) | 38, Louisiana vs. Appalachian State | 2019 |
| Fewest points scored (winning team) | 24, Louisiana vs. Appalachian State | 2021 |
| Fewest points scored | 3, Louisiana vs. Marshall | 2024 |
| Most points scored (both teams) | 83, Appalachian State (45) vs. Louisiana (38) | 2019 |
| Fewest points scored (both teams) | 34, Marshall (31) vs. Louisiana (3) | 2024 |
| Most points scored in a half | 35, Appalachian State (1st half) vs. Louisiana; 35, Troy (2nd half) vs. Appalachian State | 2019; 2023 |
| Most points scored in a half (both teams) | 52, Appalachian State vs. Louisiana (1st half) | 2019 |
| Largest margin of victory | 28, Marshall (31) vs. Louisiana (3) | 2024 |
| Smallest margin of victory | 7, Appalachian State (45) vs. Louisiana (38) | 2019 |
| Total yards | 513, Louisiana (354 passing, 159 rushing) vs. Appalachian State | 2019 |
| Rushing yards | 271, Troy vs. Appalachian State | 2023 |
| Passing yards | 354, Louisiana vs. Appalachian State | 2019 |
| First downs | 31, Louisiana vs. Appalachian State | 2019 |
| Fewest yards allowed | 255, Marshall vs. Louisiana (199 passing, 56 rushing) | 2024 |
| Fewest rushing yards allowed | 56, Marshall vs. Louisiana | 2021 |
| Fewest passing yards allowed | 75, Louisiana vs. Appalachian State | 2018 |
| Individual | Record, Player, Team vs. Opponent | Year |
| All-purpose yards | 233, Kimani Vidal, Troy vs. Appalachian State | 2023 |
| Touchdowns responsible for | 5, Kimani Vidal, Troy vs. Appalachian State | 2023 |
| Rushing yards | 233, Kimani Vidal, Troy vs. Appalachian State | 2023 |
| Rushing touchdowns | 5, Kimani Vidal, Troy vs. Appalachian State | 2023 |
| Passing yards | 354, Levi Lewis, Louisiana vs. Appalachian State | 2021 |
| Passing touchdowns | 4, Levi Lewis, Louisiana vs. Appalachian State | 2019 |
| Receiving yards | 134, RaJae' Johnson, Troy vs. Coastal Carolina | 2022 |
| Receiving touchdowns | 2, shared by: RaJae' Johnson, Troy vs. Coastal Carolina; Darrynton Evans, Appalachian State vs. Louisiana; Peter LeBlanc, Louisiana vs. Appalachian State | 2022; 2019; 2019 |
| Tackles | 13, Jacques Boudreaux, Louisiana vs. Appalachian State | 2019 |
| Sacks | 2, shared by: Javon Solomon, Troy vs. Appalachian State; Nick Hampton, Appalachian State vs. Louisiana; Zi’Yon Hill, Louisiana vs. Appalachian State | 2023; 2021; 2021 |
| Interceptions | 1, shared by multiple players, most recent: Josh Moten, Marshall vs. Louisiana | 2024 |
| Long Plays | Record, Player, Team vs. Opponent | Year |
| Touchdown run | 56, Levi Lewis, Louisiana vs. Appalachian State | 2021 |
| Touchdown pass | 67, RaJae' Johnson from Gunnar Watson, Troy vs. Coastal Carolina | 2022 |
| Kickoff return | 97, Darrynton Evans, Appalachian State vs. Louisiana | 2018 |
| Punt return | 12, Jacob Bernard, Louisiana vs. Marshall | 2024 |
| Interception return | 32, Tae Hayes, Appalachian State vs. Louisiana | 2018 |
| Field goal | 53, Stevie Artigue, Louisiana vs. Appalachian State | 2019 |
| Miscellaneous | Record, Team vs. Team | Year |
| Game attendance | 31,014, Appalachian State at Louisiana | 2021 |
Source: Sun Belt Conference

== See also ==
- List of NCAA Division I FBS conference championship games
