= Caleb Evans (quarterback) =

American gridiron football player (born 1998)

- Evans with the Montreal Alouettes in 2026

No. 18 – Montreal Alouettes
- Position: Quarterback
- Roster status: Active
- CFL status: American

Personal information
- Born: July 16, 1998 (age 28); Mansfield, Texas, U.S.
- Listed height: 6 ft 2 in (1.88 m)
- Listed weight: 210 lb (95 kg)

Career information
- High school: Mansfield (Mansfield, Texas); Bishop Dunne (Dallas, Texas)
- College: Louisiana–Monroe (2016–2019)
- NFL draft: 2020: undrafted

Career history
- Ottawa Redblacks (2021–2022); Montreal Alouettes (2023–present)

Awards and highlights
- Grey Cup champion (2023); CFL rushing touchdowns leader (2022)

Career CFL statistics as of 2026
- Passing completions: 322
- Passing attempts: 522
- TD–INT: 19–23
- Passing yards: 3,749
- Rushing touchdowns: 36
- Stats at CFL.ca

Caleb Evans (born July 16, 1998) is an American professional football quarterback for the Montreal Alouettes of the Canadian Football League (CFL). He played college football at Louisiana–Monroe.

== Early life ==
Evans played football at Mansfield High School in Mansfield, Texas before transferring to play his final two seasons at Bishop Dunne Catholic School in Dallas, Texas.

== College career ==
Evans played college football for the Louisiana-Monroe Warhawks at the University of Louisiana at Monroe in Monroe, Louisiana. He played in 43 games for the Warhawks from 2016 to 2019 where he threw for 9,513 yards with 58 touchdowns and 34 interceptions.

=== Statistics ===
Season	Team	Games			Passing								Rushing			
Season	Team	GP	GS	Record	Comp	Att	Pct	Yards	Avg	TD	Int	Rate	Att	Yards	Avg	TD
2016	Louisiana–Monroe	7	4	2–2	76	144	52.8	834	5.8	4	6	102.3	51	163	3.2	1
2017	Louisiana–Monroe	12	11	4–7	211	344	61.3	2,868	8.3	17	6	144.2	137	579	4.2	13
2018	Louisiana–Monroe	12	12	6–6	231	374	61.8	2,869	7.7	16	12	133.9	140	632	4.5	10
2019	Louisiana–Monroe	12	12	5–7	239	390	61.3	2,942	7.5	21	10	137.3	140	794	5.7	12
Career		43	39	17–22	757	1,252	60.5	9,513	7.6	58	34	134.1	468	2,168	4.6	36

== Professional career ==
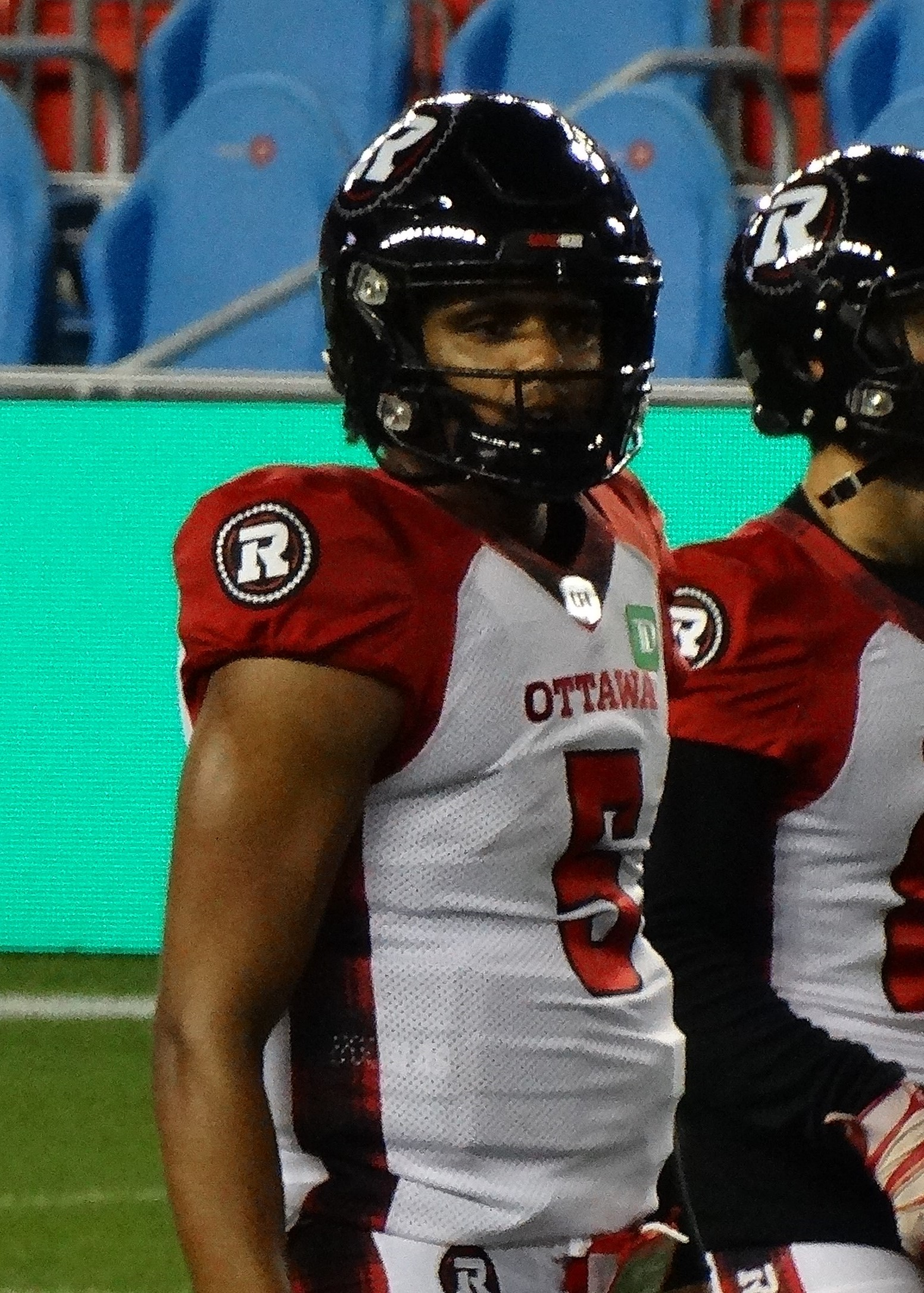
Evans with the Ottawa Redblacks in 2021

=== Ottawa Redblacks ===
Evans was not selected in the 2020 NFL draft and remained unsigned until December 14, 2020 when he agreed to a contract with the Ottawa Redblacks. Evans began the season on the practice roster, but was named the starting quarterback for the team's Week 9 match against the Edmonton Elks with veterans Matt Nichols and Dominique Davis both being placed on injured reserve. Evans played surprisingly well in his first appearance in the CFL, completing 15 of 22 passes for 191 yards with three touchdowns and no interceptions, leading Ottawa to their second win of the season. In his second career start, Evans threw three interceptions, two of which were returned for touchdowns in the third quarter as the Redblacks were defeated 35–16. Over the subsequent weeks Evans's performances continued to decline, including being benched in the team's Week 11 loss to the Alouettes. Nevertheless, head coach Paul LaPolice announced Evans would be the team's starting quarterback in Week 12 against the Hamilton Tiger-Cats. Evans continued to start for the Redblacks until Week 14 when it was announced that former NFL quarterback Devlin Hodges would make his CFL debut. Evans finished the season with 108 completed passes for 1,279 yards with five touchdown passes and nine interceptions. The Redblacks finished the season with only three wins, finishing last in the East division, missing the playoffs in the process.

During the offseason the Redblacks signed veteran Jeremiah Masoli to be the team's starting quarterback. Masoli started the first four games of the season before suffering a bone injury in his leg which would cause him to miss an extended period of time. Three days later the Redblacks traded for quarterback Nick Arbuckle from Edmonton to compete with Evans for the starting role while Masoli recovered. Evans started the next five games for the Redblacks, however the team's record fell to 1–8, which prompted head coach Paul LaPolice to announce Arbuckle as Ottawa's starting quarterback for the club's Week 12 match against the Edmonton Elks. Serving as the team's short yardage quarterback Evans surpassed hall-of-famer Doug Flutie setting a CFL record for most rushing touchdowns in a season by a quarterback with 15. With the playoffs out of reach, Evans was named the team's starting quarterback for the final game of the regular season. He became a free agent upon the expiry of his contract on February 14, 2023.

=== Montreal Alouettes ===
On February 14, 2023, it was announced that Evans had signed a two-year contract with the Montreal Alouettes. He dressed primarily as the backup quarterback in 2023, but started in place of the incumbent starter, Cody Fajardo, for two games, winning both, while the latter recovered from an injury.

Evans became a free agent upon the expiry of his contract on February 10, 2026. He re-signed with the Alouettes on September 1.

=== CFL career statistics ===
Year	Team	Games			Passing								Rushing			
Year	Team	GP	GS	Record	Cmp	Att	Pct	Yds	Y/A	TD	Int	Rtg	Att	Yds	Y/A	TD
2021	OTT	8	7	2–5	108	182	59.3	1,279	7.0	5	9	69.4	42	345	8.2	3
2022	OTT	18	6	1–5	114	185	61.6	1,301	7.0	4	7	74.2	88	354	4.0	16
2023	MTL	18	2	2–0	43	67	64.2	573	8.6	4	3	81.3	48	185	3.9	8
2024	MTL	8	1	0–1	26	45	57.8	307	6.8	4	2	89.8	24	55	2.29	4
2025	MTL	10	1	0–1	20	29	69.0	207	7.1	1	0	100.8	19	50	2.6	2
Career		62	17	5–12	311	508	61.2	3,667	7.2	17	22	76.3	221	989	4.5	33

== Personal life ==
Evans was born in Mansfield, Texas to parents Efrem and Kim Evans. He has eight siblings, including Jerod Evans, who played quarterback for the Virginia Tech Hokies, and Lance Evans, who played wide receiver for the Texas A&M–Commerce Lions.
