= Marcus Green (wide receiver) =

American gridiron football player (born 1996)

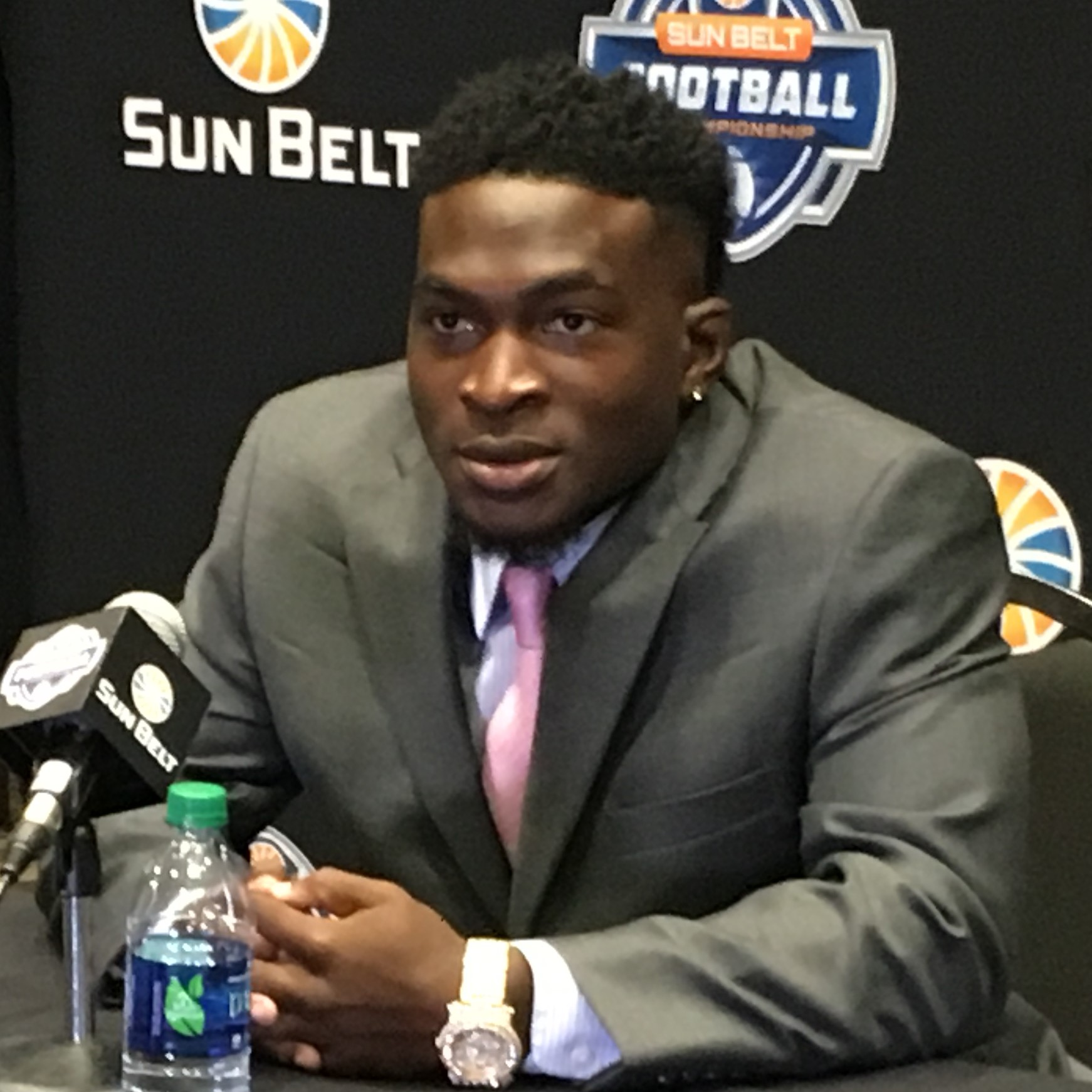
- Green in 2018

No. 3
- Position: Wide receiver

Personal information
- Born: August 13, 1996 (age 30); New Albany, Mississippi, U.S.
- Listed height: 5 ft 9 in (1.75 m)
- Listed weight: 191 lb (87 kg)

Career information
- High school: North Pontotoc (MS)
- College: Louisiana–Monroe (2014–2018)
- NFL draft: 2019: 6th round, 203rd overall pick

Career history
- Atlanta Falcons (2019)*; Philadelphia Eagles (2019–2020)*; Hamilton Tiger-Cats (2021); New Jersey Generals (2023)
- * Offseason or practice squad member only

Awards and highlights
- 2× First-team All-Sun Belt (2017–2018)
- Stats at Pro Football Reference

Marcus Antonio Green (born August 13, 1996) is an American former professional football wide receiver. He played college football at Louisiana–Monroe and was selected by the Atlanta Falcons in the sixth round of the 2019 NFL draft.

== College career ==
Green was redshirted his freshman year, and then led Louisiana-Monroe in receptions and yards his redshirt freshman year with 63 receptions for 698 yards. Green had his breakthrough year as a junior, leading the NCAA with a 32.4 yard average on kick returns, and also leading the NCAA with 4 kickoff returns for touchdowns. Green finished his Warhawk career tied for the all time school lead in receiving touchdowns with 23, #3 in career receptions with 202, and #2 in career receiving yards with 2698.

== Professional career ==
=== Atlanta Falcons ===
Green was selected by the Atlanta Falcons in the sixth round (203rd overall) of the 2019 NFL draft. He was waived during final roster cuts on August 31, 2019.

=== Philadelphia Eagles ===
Green was signed to the practice squad of the Philadelphia Eagles on September 1, 2019. He signed a reserve/future contract with the Eagles on January 6, 2020.

Green was waived on July 26, 2020, and re-signed on August 17, 2020. He was waived again by the Eagles on September 3, 2020. He was re-signed to the practice squad on September 24. He was released on November 3.

=== Hamilton Tiger-Cats ===
Green signed with the Hamilton Tiger-Cats of the Canadian Football League on April 16, 2021. He re-signed with the team on March 30, 2022, but retired on May 19, 2022.

=== New Jersey Generals ===
Green signed with the New Jersey Generals of the United States Football League (USFL) on October 22, 2022. He was released on April 10, 2023, and re-signed on April 13. The Generals folded when the XFL and USFL merged to create the United Football League (UFL).

== Personal life ==
Green's mother, RheaKesha Vaughn, is a professional urban contemporary gospel recording artist. She also holds the position of Minister of Music of District 10 - Tupelo District of the Church of God in Christ Northern Mississippi Ecclesiastical Jurisdiction.
