= 2018 Louisiana Ragin' Cajuns football team =

American college football season

2018 Louisiana Ragin' Cajuns football

Sun Belt West Division co-champion

Sun Belt Championship Game, L 19–30 vs. Appalachian State

Cure Bowl, L 24–41 vs. Tulane
- Conference: Sun Belt Conference
- West Division
- Record: 7–7 (5–3 Sun Belt)
- Head coach: Billy Napier (1st season)
- Offensive coordinator: Rob Sale (1st season)
- Offensive scheme: Pro-style
- Defensive coordinator: Ron Roberts (1st season)
- Base defense: Multiple
- Home stadium: Cajun Field

2018 Sun Belt Conference football standings
	Conf.			Overall
Team	W		L	W		L
East Division
Appalachian State xy$	7	–	1	11	–	2
Troy x	7	–	1	10	–	3
Georgia Southern	6	–	2	10	–	3
Coastal Carolina	2	–	6	5	–	7
Georgia State	1	–	7	2	–	10
West Division
Louisiana xy	5	–	3	7	–	7
Arkansas State x	5	–	3	8	–	5
Louisiana–Monroe	4	–	4	6	–	6
South Alabama	2	–	6	3	–	9
Texas State	1	–	7	3	–	9
Championship: Appalachian State 30, Louisiana 19
$ – Conference champion; x – Division champion/co-champions; y – Championship game participant

The 2018 Louisiana Ragin' Cajuns football team represented the University of Louisiana at Lafayette in the 2018 NCAA Division I FBS football season. The Ragin' Cajuns played their home games at Cajun Field in Lafayette, Louisiana and competed in the West Division of the Sun Belt Conference. They were led by first-year head coach Billy Napier. They finished the season 7–7, 5–3 in Sun Belt play to finish in a tie for the West Division championship with Arkansas State. Due to their head-to-head win over Arkansas State, they represented the West Division in the inaugural Sun Belt Championship Game where they lost to East Division champion Appalachian State. They were invited to the Cure Bowl where they lost to Tulane.

== Preseason ==
=== Recruiting class ===
College recruiting information
Name	Hometown	School	Height	Weight	40^{‡}	Commit date
Rhys Burns #92 P	Melbourne, Australia	Padua College	6 ft 0 in (1.83 m)	190 lb (86 kg)	–	Feb 8, 2018
Rhys Burns #92 P	Recruit ratings: No ratings found					
Percy Butler #16 CB	Plaquemine, LA	Plaquemine HS	6 ft 0 in (1.83 m)	172 lb (78 kg)	–	Feb 8, 2018
Percy Butler #16 CB	Recruit ratings: No ratings found					
Jordan Cordova #23 LB	Kinder, LA	Kinder HS	5 ft 11 in (1.80 m)	210 lb (95 kg)	–	Feb 8, 2018
Jordan Cordova #23 LB	Recruit ratings: No ratings found					
Kendall Johnson Jr. #10 CB	Lafayette, LA	St. Thomas More HS/Nevada	6 ft 0 in (1.83 m)	193 lb (88 kg)	–	Feb 8, 2018
Kendall Johnson Jr. #10 CB	Recruit ratings: No ratings found					
Luke Junkunc #78 OL	Houston, TX	Strake Jesuit College Preparatory	6 ft 3 in (1.91 m)	256 lb (116 kg)	–	Feb 8, 2018
Luke Junkunc #78 OL	Recruit ratings: No ratings found					
Johnny Lumpkin #88 TE	Atlanta, GA	Frederick Douglass HS/Hutchinson CC	6 ft 5 in (1.96 m)	265 lb (120 kg)	–	Feb 8, 2018
Johnny Lumpkin #88 TE	Recruit ratings: No ratings found					
Chauncey Manac #17 DL	Homerville, GA	Clinch County HS/Garden City CC	6 ft 3 in (1.91 m)	252 lb (114 kg)	–	Feb 8, 2018
Chauncey Manac #17 DL	Recruit ratings: No ratings found					
Lorenzo McCaskill #2 LB	Detroit, MI	Southfield HS/Holmes CC	6 ft 1 in (1.85 m)	210 lb (95 kg)	–	Feb 8, 2018
Lorenzo McCaskill #2 LB	Recruit ratings: No ratings found					
Garrald McDowell #8 DL	Covington, LA	Covington HS/Ole Miss	6 ft 1 in (1.85 m)	270 lb (120 kg)	–	Feb 8, 2018
Garrald McDowell #8 DL	Recruit ratings: No ratings found					
Max Mitchell #74 OL	Monroe, LA	Neville HS	6 ft 5 in (1.96 m)	271 lb (123 kg)	–	Feb 8, 2018
Max Mitchell #74 OL	Recruit ratings: No ratings found					
Kris Moncrief #4 LB	Raleigh, MS	Raleigh HS	6 ft 1 in (1.85 m)	235 lb (107 kg)	–	Feb 8, 2018
Kris Moncrief #4 LB	Recruit ratings: No ratings found					
Timaje Porter #90 DL	Grand Bay, AL	Theodore HS	6 ft 1 in (1.85 m)	350 lb (160 kg)	–	Feb 8, 2018
Timaje Porter #90 DL	Recruit ratings: No ratings found					
Andre Riley #95 LB	Plaquemine, LA	Plaquemine HS	6 ft 2 in (1.88 m)	195 lb (88 kg)	–	Feb 8, 2018
Andre Riley #95 LB	Recruit ratings: No ratings found					
Chris Smith #24 RB	Nanih Waiya, MS	Nanih Waiya HS	5 ft 10 in (1.78 m)	186 lb (84 kg)	–	Feb 8, 2018
Chris Smith #24 RB	Recruit ratings: No ratings found					
Asjlin Washington #18 DB	Houston, TX	C.E. King HS	6 ft 0 in (1.83 m)	177 lb (80 kg)	–	Feb 8, 2018
Asjlin Washington #18 DB	Recruit ratings: No ratings found					
Max Yarbrough #72 OL	Friendswood, TX	Friendswood HS	6 ft 3 in (1.91 m)	276 lb (125 kg)	–	Feb 8, 2018
Max Yarbrough #72 OL	Recruit ratings: No ratings found					
Wesley Blazek #11 QB	Lafayette, LA	Teurlings Catholic HS	6 ft 3 in (1.91 m)	192 lb (87 kg)	–	Feb 8, 2018
Wesley Blazek #11 QB	Recruit ratings: No ratings found					
Eric Garror #19 DB	Mobile, AL	McGill–Toolen HS	5 ft 9 in (1.75 m)	180 lb (82 kg)	–	Feb 8, 2018
Eric Garror #19 DB	Recruit ratings: No ratings found					
Christian Waller #21 DB	League City, TX	Clear Springs HS	5 ft 10 in (1.78 m)	173 lb (78 kg)	–	Feb 8, 2018
Christian Waller #21 DB	Recruit ratings: No ratings found					
Devon Pauley #30 WR	Lake Charles, LA	Barbe HS	5 ft 8 in (1.73 m)	165 lb (75 kg)	–	Feb 8, 2018
Devon Pauley #30 WR	Recruit ratings: No ratings found					
Michael Orphey Jr. #33 WR	Alexandria, LA	Alexandria HS	5 ft 10 in (1.78 m)	185 lb (84 kg)	–	Feb 8, 2018
Michael Orphey Jr. #33 WR	Recruit ratings: No ratings found					
Tyler Clark #34 WR	Alexandria, LA	Peabody Magnet HS	5 ft 10 in (1.78 m)	208 lb (94 kg)	–	Feb 8, 2018
Tyler Clark #34 WR	Recruit ratings: No ratings found					
Kaleb Carter #36 WR	Cecilia, LA	Cecilia HS	6 ft 0 in (1.83 m)	180 lb (82 kg)	–	Feb 8, 2018
Kaleb Carter #36 WR	Recruit ratings: No ratings found					
Kam Pedescleaux #36 DB	Houston, TX	Manvel HS	5 ft 9 in (1.75 m)	180 lb (82 kg)	–	Feb 8, 2018
Kam Pedescleaux #36 DB	Recruit ratings: No ratings found					
Kenneth Almendares #40 K	Clute, TX	Brazoswood HS	6 ft 1 in (1.85 m)	188 lb (85 kg)	–	Feb 8, 2018
Kenneth Almendares #40 K	Recruit ratings: No ratings found					
Keon Jean-Baptiste #45 LB	Lafayette, LA	Carencro HS	6 ft 4 in (1.93 m)	238 lb (108 kg)	–	Feb 8, 2018
Keon Jean-Baptiste #45 LB	Recruit ratings: No ratings found					
Tamir Bryant #52 DB	New Orleans, LA	Lutcher HS	6 ft 1 in (1.85 m)	238 lb (108 kg)	–	Feb 8, 2018
Tamir Bryant #52 DB	Recruit ratings: No ratings found					
Sammy Ochoa #54 DB	Lake Travis, TX	Lake Travis HS	6 ft 1 in (1.85 m)	295 lb (134 kg)	–	Feb 8, 2018
Sammy Ochoa #54 DB	Recruit ratings: No ratings found					
Pearse Migl #86 TE	Welsh, LA	Welsh HS	6 ft 3 in (1.91 m)	243 lb (110 kg)	–	Feb 8, 2018
Pearse Migl #86 TE	Recruit ratings: No ratings found					
Masry Mapieu #93 DL	York, NE	York HS	6 ft 4 in (1.93 m)	294 lb (133 kg)	–	Feb 8, 2018
Masry Mapieu #93 DL	Recruit ratings: No ratings found					
Overall recruit ranking:
Note: In many cases, Scout, Rivals, 247Sports, On3, and ESPN may conflict in their listings of height and weight.; In these cases, the average was taken. ESPN grades are on a 100-point scale.; Sources: "2018 Team Ranking". Rivals.com.

=== Award watch lists ===
Listed in the order that they were released

Award	Player	Position	Year
John Mackey Award	Chase Rogers	TE	SO
Wuerffel Trophy	Deuce Wallace	DB	JR

=== Sun Belt coaches poll ===
On July 19, 2018, the Sun Belt released their preseason coaches poll with the Ragin' Cajuns predicted to finish in fourth place in the West Division.

=== Preseason All-Sun Belt Teams ===
The Ragin' Cajuns had two players selected to the preseason all-Sun Belt teams.

Offense

1st team

Kevin Dotson – OL

2nd team

Trey Ragas – RB

== Roster ==
2018 Louisiana Ragin' Cajuns football team roster
Players
Coaches
Offense

Pos.	#	Name	Class
WR	2	Ja'Marcus Bradley	Jr
RB	3	Ashton Johnson	Jr
RB	4	Raymond Calais	Jr
QB	6	Quentin Gibson	Jr
QB	7	Andre Nunez	Sr
QB	8	Dion Ray	Jr
RB	9	Trey Ragas	So
TE	10	Matt Barnes	Sr
QB	11	Wesley Blazek	Fr
WR	13	Ryheem Malone	Sr
RB	15	Elijah Mitchell	So
QB	17	Levi Lewis	So
WR	18	Jalen Williams	So
WR	19	Kadon Harrison	Fr
WR	21	Keenan Barnes (injured)	Sr
WR	22	Earnest Patterson	Sr
RB	23	Jordan Wright	Jr
WR	24	Chris Smith	Fr
WR	25	Jamal Bell	So
RB	26	Lenard Calloway (injured)	Sr
WR	30	Devon Pauley	Fr
WR	33	Michael Orphey Jr.	Fr
WR	34	Tyler Clark	Fr
WR	36	Kaleb Carter	Fr
TE	39	Peyton Aucoin (injured)	So
OL	50	Robert Hunt	Jr
OL	61	Cole Prudhomme	Jr
OL	63	Spencer Gardner	Fr
OL	64	Shane Vallot	Fr
OL	65	Carlos Rubio	Fr
OL	66	Rico Robinson	Jr
OL	67	Ken Marks	Jr
OL	69	Caden Cunningham	Jr
OL	70	Staten Wade	Jr
OL	71	Akkai Ward	So
OL	72	Max Yarbrough	Fr
OL	73	David Hudson	Fr
OL	74	Max Mitchell	Fr
OL	75	Kevin Dotson	Jr
OL	76	Kendell Baker	So
OL	77	Adrian Goodacre	Sr
OL	78	Luke Junkunc	Fr
OL	79	Kordell Brewster	Sr
TE	81	Alex Allen	Jr
WR	82	Da'Ron Williams	So
WR	83	Pat Hughes	Fr
WR	84	Leroy Franklin	So
WR	85	Calif Gossett	So
TE	86	Pearse Migl	Fr
TE	87	Chris Turner	Jr
TE	88	Johnny Lumpkin	So
WR	89	Hunter Bergeron	Fr
TE	97	Andre Landry	Fr

Defense

Pos.	#	Name	Class
LB	2	Lorenzo McCaskill	So
LB	4	Kris Moncrief	Fr
DB	6	Corey Turner	Sr
LB	7	Ferrod Gardner	Jr
DE	8	Garrald McDowell	Sr
DB	9	Kamar Greenhouse	Jr
DB	10	Kendall Johnson	Sr
DB	11	Michael Jacquet	Jr
DB	13	Vince Thomas	Sr
DE	15	Bennie Higgins	Jr
DB	16	Percy Butler	Fr
LB	17	Chauncey Manac	So
DB	18	Asjlin Washington	Fr
DB	19	Eric Garror	Fr
DB	20	Cameron Solomon	So
DB	21	Christian Walker	Fr
DB	22	Daijuane Dorsey	So
LB	23	Jordan Cordova	Fr
DB	24	Bralen Trahan	So
DB	25	Deuce Wallace	Jr
DB	26	Blair Brooks	So
DB	27	Caleb Glenn	Fr
DB	28	Ja'Len Johnson	Fr
DB	29	Koa Hayes	Sr
DB	30	Julius Perkins	Sr
LB	31	Alonzo Brown	Jr
DB	33	Jamarius Williams	Sr
LB	34	Brayden Bailey	Sr
LB	35	Chaiziere Malbrue	Sr
DB	36	Kam Pedescleaux	Sr
DB	37	Errol Brown	Sr
DB	38	Terik Miller (injured)	Jr
DE	39	Carols Robinson	Jr
LB	40	Jourdon Quibodeaux	Fr
LB	44	Tanner Wiggins	So
LB	45	Keon Jean-Baptiste	Fr
LB	50	Andre Jones Jr.	So
LB	51	Ken Jones	Fr
DL	52	Tamir Bryant	Fr
LB	53	Chandler Wachholtz	Jr
DL	54	Sammy Ochoa (injured)	Fr
LB	55	Tommy Whitted (injured)	Jr
LB	58	Justin Middleton	Sr
LB	59	Jacques Boudreaux	Jr
DL	90	Timaje Porter	Fr
DL	93	Masry Mapieu	Fr
DL	94	Zi'Yon Hill	Fr
LB	95	Andre Riley	Fr
DE	96	Malcolm Rollins	Fr
DT	98	Ladarrius Kidd	Sr
DT	99	Tra'Vonte Booker	Jr

Special teams

Pos.	#	Name	Class
K	40	Kenneth Almendares	Fr
K	41	Calvin Linden	Sr
K	46	Kyle Pfau	Sr
LS	49	Paul Boudreaux	Fr
LS	57	Jackson Ladner	Sr
P	92	Rhys Byrns	Fr

Head coach

- Billy Napier (Furman)

Coordinators/assistant coaches

- Rob Sale (LSU)
  Offensive coordinator/OL
- Ron Roberts (UT Martin)
  Defensive coordinator
- Michael Desormeaux (Louisiana)
  Assistant head coach/TE
- Zac Etheridge (Auburn)
  Assistant head coach/CB
- Jabbar Juke (Southern)
  Assistant head coach/RB
- Tim Leger(McNeese State)
  Assistant head coach/WR/recruiting coordinator
- D. J. Looney(Mississippi State)
  Assistant head coach/Assistant OL
- Matt Powledge (Sam Houston State)
  Assistant head coach/OLB/Special Team coordinator
- Rory Segrest (Alabama)
  Assistant head coach/DL
- Patrick Toney (Southeastern Louisiana)
  Assistant head coach/S
- Troy Wingerter (Louisiana)
  Director of football operations
- Mark Hocke (New Orleans)
  Director of strength and conditioning
- Darren Walker (Louisiana)
  Assistant Director of Athletics for Video Operations
- Austin Armstrong (Huntington)
  Graduate assistant

Legend

- (C) Team captain
- (S) Suspended
- (I) Ineligible
- Injured
- Redshirt

Roster
Last update: August 18, 2018

== Schedule ==
The 2018 schedule consisted of 6 home and 6 away games in the regular season. The Ragin' Cajuns would host Sun Belt foes Arkansas State, Coastal Carolina, Georgia State, and South Alabama. The Cajuns would travel to Sun Belt foes Appalachian State, Louisiana-Monroe, Texas State, and Troy.

The Ragin' Cajuns would host two of the four non-conference opponents, Grambling State of the Southwestern Athletic Conference (SWAC) and the New Mexico State, an Independent school, and would travel to Southeastern Conference (SEC) members Alabama and Mississippi State.

The Ragin' Cajuns would travel once more to face off with the Appalachian State Mountaineers in the first annual Sun Belt Conference Championship Game.

Date	Time	Opponent	Site	TV	Result	Attendance
September 1	6:00 p.m.	Grambling State*	Cajun Field; Lafayette, LA	ESPN3	W 49–17	28,866
September 15	6:30 p.m.	at No. 16 Mississippi State*	Davis Wade Stadium; Starkville, MS	ESPN2	L 10–56	56,505
September 22	6:00 p.m.	Coastal Carolina	Cajun Field; Lafayette, LA	ESPN+	L 28–30	17,125
September 29	11:00 a.m.	at No. 1 Alabama*	Bryant–Denny Stadium; Tuscaloosa, AL	SECN	L 14–56	101,471
October 6	6:00 p.m.	at Texas State	Bobcat Stadium; San Marcos, TX	ESPN+	W 42–27	17,062
October 13	4:00 p.m.	New Mexico State*^{†}	Cajun Field; Lafayette, LA	ESPN+	W 66–38	18,131
October 20	2:30 p.m.	at Appalachian State	Kidd Brewer Stadium; Boone, NC	ESPN+	L 17–27	27,082
October 27	6:00 p.m.	Arkansas State	Cajun Field; Lafayette, LA	ESPN+	W 47–43	17,068
November 3	2:30 p.m.	at Troy	Veterans Memorial Stadium; Troy, AL	ESPN+	L 16–26	24,631
November 10	4:00 p.m.	Georgia State	Cajun Field; Lafayette, LA	ESPN+	W 36–22	14,945
November 17	4:00 p.m.	South Alabama	Cajun Field; Lafayette, LA	ESPN3	W 48–38	15,168
November 24	2:00 p.m.	at Louisiana–Monroe	Malone Stadium; Monroe, LA (Battle on the Bayou)	ESPN+	W 31–28	18,167
December 1	11:00 a.m.	at Appalachian State	Kidd Brewer Stadium; Boone, NC (Sun Belt Championship Game)	ESPN	L 19–30	14,963
December 15	12:30 p.m.	vs. Tulane*	Camping World Stadium; Orlando FL (Cure Bowl)	CBSSN	L 24–41	19,066
*Non-conference game; ^{†}Homecoming; Rankings from AP Poll released prior to the game; All times are in Central time

Schedule source:

== Game summaries ==
=== Grambling State ===
Grambling State at Louisiana

Team	1	2	3	4	Total
Tigers (Div. I FCS)	3	7	0	7	17
• Ragin' Cajuns	21	14	14	0	49

- Date: September 1, 2018
- Location: Cajun Field
  Lafayette, LA
- Game start: 6:06 p.m. CDT
- Elapsed time: 3 hours and 12 minutes
- Game attendance: 28,866
- Game weather: 79 °F (26 °C) • Weather: Cloudy • Wind: 5 ESE MPH
- Referee: Jeremy Parker
- Television network: ESPN3

Scoring summary
1	11:57	GRAM	Garrett Urban 22-yard field goal (5 plays, 52 yards, 2:07)	GRAM 3–0
1	08:24	LA	Trey Ragas 4-yard rush (Kyle Pfau kick) (8 plays, 81 yards, 3:26)	LA 7–3
1	04:22	LA	Ja'Marcus Bradley 3-yard pass from Andre Nunez (Kyle Pfau kick) (6 plays, 70 yards, 2:02)	LA 14–3
1	01:40	LA	Jamal Bell 18-yard pass from Levi Lewis (Kyle Pfau kick) (5 plays, 38 yards, 1:45)	LA 21–3
2	13:05	LA	Ja'Marcus Bradley 8-yard pass from Andre Nunez (Kyle Pfau kick) (5 plays, 62 yards, 1:49)	LA 28–3
2	08:28	GRAM	Geremy Hickbottom 7-yard rush (Garrett Urban kick) (10 plays, 75 yards, 4:31)	LA 28–10
2	00:11	LA	Andre Nunez 4-yard rush (Kyle Pfau kick) (12 plays, 74 yards, 3:43)	LA 35–10
3	09:38	LA	Matt Barnes 19-yard pass from Levi Lewis (Kyle Pfau kick) (10 plays, 98 yards, 4:03)	LA 42–10
3	03:55	LA	Raymond Calais 2-yard rush (Kyle Pfau kick) (7 plays, 76 yards, 2:57)	LA 49–10
4	03:41	GRAM	LaDarrian Ellis–Jones 1-yard rush (Garrett Urban kick) (15 plays, 78 yards, 7:39)	LA 49–17

Statistics	Grambling State	Louisiana
First downs	15	27
Total yards	304	556
Rushing yards	145	315
Passing yards	159	241
Turnovers	0	1
Time of possession	31:06	28:54

Team	Category	Player	Statistics
Grambling State	Passing	Geremy Hickbottom	8–18, 112 yards
Grambling State	Rushing	Geremy Hickbottom	5 carries, 61 yards, 1 TD
Grambling State	Receiving	Quintin Guice	2 receptions, 54 yards
Louisiana	Passing	Andre Nunez	19–22, 184 yards, 2 TDs
Louisiana	Rushing	Trey Ragas	13 carries, 142 yards, 1 TD
Louisiana	Receiving	Ja'Marcus Bradley	6 receptions, 70 yards, 2 TDs

=== At Mississippi State ===
Louisiana at Mississippi State

Team	1	2	3	4	Total
Ragin' Cajuns	3	0	0	7	10
• No. 16 Bulldogs	14	21	14	7	56

- Date: September 15, 2018
- Location: Davis Wade Stadium
  Starkville, MS
- Game start: 6:40 p.m. CDT
- Elapsed time: 2 hours and 57 minutes
- Game attendance: 56,505
- Game weather: 86 °F (30 °C) • Weather: Clear Skies • Wind: 6 N MPH
- Referee: Ken Williamson
- Television network: ESPN2

Scoring summary
1	11:48	LA	Kyle Pfau 38-yard field goal (9 plays, 54 yards, 3:12)	LA 3–0
1	05:06	MSST	Nick Fitzgerald 1-yard rush (Jace Christmann kick) (13 plays, 74 yards, 6:36)	MSST 7–3
1	00:10	MSST	Nick Fitzgerald 10-yard rush (Jace Christmann kick) (6 plays, 62 yards, 2:14)	MSST 14–3
2	09:35	MSST	Aeris Williams 3-yard rush (Jace Christmann kick) (7 plays, 67 yards, 4:00)	MSST 21–3
2	04:54	MSST	Nick Fitzgerald 2-yard rush (Jace Christmann kick) (5 plays, 48 yards, 2:16)	MSST 28–3
2	00:18	MSST	Stephen Guidry 39-yard pass from Nick Fitzgerald (Jace Christmann kick) (5 plays, 64 yards, 1:11)	MSST 35–3
3	13:16	MSST	Nick Fitzgerald 26-yard rush (Jace Christmann kick) (4 plays, 65 yards, 1:39)	MSST 42–3
3	06:01	MSST	Keith Mixon 25-yard pass from Nick Fitzgerald (Jace Christmann kick) (9 plays, 85 yards, 3:52)	MSST 49–3
4	07:31	LA	Ja'Marcus Bradley 4-yard pass from Andre Nunez (Kyle Pfau kick) (10 plays, 47 yards, 5:11)	MSST 49–10
4	04:22	MSST	Keytaon Thompson 16-yard rush (Jace Christmann kick) (7 plays, 75 yards, 3:09)	MSST 56–10

Statistics	Louisiana	Mississippi State
First downs	13	29
Total yards	310	607
Rushing yards	65	331
Passing yards	245	276
Turnovers	1	1
Time of possession	27:01	32:59

Team	Category	Player	Statistics
Louisiana	Passing	Andre Nunez	21–29, 224 yards
Louisiana	Rushing	Trey Ragas	7 carries, 49 yards
Louisiana	Receiving	Keenan Barnes	4 receptions, 76 yards
Mississippi State	Passing	Nick Fitzgerald	14–21, 243 yards, 2 TDs
Mississippi State	Rushing	Nick Fitzgerald	15 carries, 107 yards, 4 TDs
Mississippi State	Receiving	Keith Mixon	4 receptions, 80 yards, 1 TD

=== Coastal Carolina ===
Coastal Carolina at Louisiana

Team	1	2	3	4	Total
• Chanticleers	3	13	7	7	30
Ragin' Cajuns	7	0	14	7	28

- Date: September 22, 2018
- Location: Cajun Field
  Lafayette, LA
- Game start: 6:05 p.m. CDT
- Elapsed time: 2 hours and 59 minutes
- Game attendance: 17,125
- Game weather: 77 °F (25 °C) • Weather: Cloudy • Wind: 4 NNE MPH
- Referee: Jason Autrey
- Television network: ESPN+

Scoring summary
1	06:13	LA	Trey Ragas 3-yard rush (Kyle Pfau kick) (8 plays, 79 yards, 3:49)	LA 7–0
1	02:31	CCU	Massimo Biscardi 50-yard field goal (9 plays, 44 yards, 3:42)	LA 7–3
2	08:41	CCU	Marcus Outlow 2-yard rush (Massimo Biscardi kick) (13 plays, 76 yards, 7:06)	CCU 10–7
2	00:04	CCU	Ky'Jon 31-yard pass from Kilton Anderson (Massimo Biscardi kick failed) (4 plays, 68 yards, 0:24)	CCU 16–7
3	13:23	CCU	Marcus Outlow 1-yard rush (Massimo Biscardi kick) ( 4 plays, 80 yards, 1:37)	CCU 23–7
3	11:29	LA	Elijah Mitchell 30-yard rush (Kyle Pfau kick) (6 plays, 85 yards, 1:54)	CCU 23–14
3	08:30	LA	Raymond Calais 61-yard rush (Kyle Pfau kick) (3 plays, 87 yards, 0:53)	CCU 23–21
4	09:08	CCU	Isaiah Likely 29-yard pass from Byrce Carpenter (Massimo Biscardi kick) (10 plays, 87 yards, 5:52)	CCU 30–21
4	05:20	LA	Keenan Barnes 15-yard pass from Andre Nunez (Kyle Pfau kick) (10 plays, 85 yards, 3:48)	CCU 30–28

Statistics	Coastal Carolina	Louisiana
First downs	25	17
Total yards	497	381
Rushing yards	311	238
Passing yards	186	143
Turnovers	1	0
Time of possession	38:56	21:04

Team	Category	Player	Statistics
Coastal Carolina	Passing	Kilton Anderson	7–11, 104 yards, 1 TD
Coastal Carolina	Rushing	Marcus Outlow	20 carries, 96 yards, 2 TDs
Coastal Carolina	Receiving	Ky'Jon Tyler	2 receptions, 50 yards, 1 TD
Louisiana	Passing	Andre Nunez	7–14, 133 yards, 1 TD
Louisiana	Rushing	Raymond Calais	5 carries, 108 yards, 1 TD
Louisiana	Receiving	Ja'Marcus Bradley	1 reception, 53 yards

=== At Alabama ===
Louisiana at Alabama

Team	1	2	3	4	Total
Ragin' Cajuns	0	0	0	14	14
• No. 1 Crimson Tide	28	21	7	0	56

- Date: September 29, 2018
- Location: Bryant–Denny Stadium
  Tuscaloosa, AL
- Game start: 11:01 a.m. CDT
- Elapsed time: 2 hours and 55 minutes
- Game attendance: 101,471
- Game weather: 75 °F (24 °C) • Weather: Clear, sunny • Wind: 2 N MPH
- Referee: Hubert Owens
- Television network: SEC Network

Scoring summary
1	11:25	BAMA	Josh Jacobs 9-yard rush (Joseph Bulovas kick) (8 plays, 72 yards, 3:35)	BAMA 7–0
1	09:25	BAMA	Henry Ruggs 13-yard pass from Tua Tagovailoa (Joseph Bulovas kick) (2 plays, 14 yards, 0:55)	BAMA 14–0
1	08:02	BAMA	Jaylen Waddle 63-yard punt returned (Joseph Bulovas kick) (0 plays, 0 yards, 0:00)	BAMA 21–0
1	02:28	BAMA	Josh Jacobs 1-yard rush (Joseph Bulovas kick) (5 plays, 69 yards, 1:41)	BAMA 28–0
2	13:50	BAMA	Henry Ruggs 54-yard pass from Jalen Hurts (Joseph Bulovas kick) (5 plays, 80 yards, 2:03)	BAMA 35–0
2	07:26	BAMA	Najee Harris 5-yard rush (Joseph Bulovas kick) (10 plays, 70 yards, 4:14)	BAMA 42–0
2	01:28	BAMA	Jaylen Waddle 20-yard pass from Tua Tagovailoa (Joseph Bulovas kick) (7 plays, 62 yards, 3:38)	BAMA 49–0
3	01:30	BAMA	Jaylen Waddle 94-yard pass from Mac Jones (Joseph Bulovas kick) (1 plays, 93 yards, 0:33)	BAMA 56–0
4	13:37	LA	Trey Ragas 1-yard rush (Kyle Pfau kick) (6 plays, 78 yards, 2:53)	BAMA 56–7
4	03:58	LA	Ja'Marcus Bradley 18-yard pass from Andre Nunez (Kyle Pfau kick) (11 plays, 80 yards, 6:06)	BAMA 56–14

Statistics	Louisiana	Alabama
First downs	15	26
Total yards	288	608
Rushing yards	200	268
Passing yards	88	304
Turnovers	2	0
Time of possession	29:56	30:04

Team	Category	Player	Statistics
Louisiana	Passing	Andre Nunez	9–15, 75 yards, 1 TD, 2 INTs
Louisiana	Rushing	Trey Ragas	16 carries, 111 yards, 1 TD
Louisiana	Receiving	Ja'Marcus Bradley	3 receptions, 24 yards, 1 TD
Alabama	Passing	Tua Tagovailoa	8–8, 128 yards, 2 TDs
Alabama	Rushing	Najee Harris	11 carries, 73 yards, 1 TD
Alabama	Receiving	Jaylen Waddle	3 receptions, 138 yards, 2 TDs

=== At Texas State ===
Louisiana at Texas State

Team	1	2	3	4	Total
• Ragin' Cajuns	7	21	7	7	42
Bobcats	0	0	13	14	27

- Date: October 6, 2018
- Location: Bobcat Stadium
  San Marcos, TX
- Game start: 6:24 p.m. CDT
- Elapsed time: 3 hours and 4 minutes
- Game attendance: 17,062
- Game weather: 87 °F (31 °C) • Weather: partly cloudy skies • Wind: 13 SE MPH
- Referee: Ted Pitts
- Television network: ESPN+

Scoring summary
1	04:54	LA	Trey Ragas 1-yard rush (Kyle Pfau kick) (8 plays, 60 yards, 3:23)	LA 7–0
2	14:55	LA	Elijah Mitchell 13-yard rush (Kyle Pfau kick) (5 plays, 76 yards, 1:46)	LA 14–0
2	07:57	LA	Ja'Marcus Bradley 3-yard pass from Levi Lewis (Kyle Pfau kick) (11 plays, 61 yards, 5:55)	LA 21–0
2	00:45	LA	Elijah Mitchell 9-yard rush (Kyle Pfau kick) (11 plays, 81 yards, 3:43)	LA 28–0
3	11:10	TXST	Jeremiah Hayden 36-yard pass from Tyler Vitt (Clayton Stewart kick failed) (1 play, 36 yards, 0:06)	LA 28–6
3	06:14	TXST	Tyler Vitt 5-yard pass from Hutch White (Clayton Stewart kick) (6 plays, 77 yards, 2:35)	LA 28–13
3	02:24	LA	Elijah Mitchell 6-yard rush (Kyle Pfau kick) (8 plays, 88 yards, 3:44)	LA 35–13
4	14:55	TXST	Keenen Brown 27-yard pass from Tyler Vitt (Clayton Stewart kick) (7 plays, 75 yards, 2:29)	LA 35–20
4	12:38	LA	Ryheem Malone 6-yard pass from Andre Nunez (Kyle Pfau kick) (5 plays, 75 yards, 2:17)	LA 42–20
4	09:17	TXST	Keenen Brown 15-yard pass from Tyler Vitt (Clayton Stewart kick) (8 plays, 75 yards, 3:21)	LA 42–27

Statistics	Louisiana	Texas State
First downs	23	22
Total yards	557	425
Rushing yards	327	124
Passing yards	230	301
Turnovers	1	0
Time of possession	32:18	27:42

Team	Category	Player	Statistics
Louisiana	Passing	Andre Nunez	9–18, 149 yards, 1 TD, 1 INT
Louisiana	Rushing	Elijah Mitchell	20 carries, 191 yards, 3 TDs
Louisiana	Receiving	Ja'Marcus Bradley	4 receptions, 85 yards, 1 TD
Texas State	Passing	Tyler Vitt	28–39, 296 yards, 3 TDs
Texas State	Rushing	Tyler Vitt	17 carries, 92 yards
Texas State	Receiving	Keenen Brown	4 receptions, 90 yards, 2 TDs

=== New Mexico State ===
New Mexico State at Louisiana

Team	1	2	3	4	Total
Aggies	14	7	10	7	38
• Ragin' Cajuns	28	17	7	14	66

- Date: October 13, 2018
- Location: Cajun Field
  Lafayette, LA
- Game start: 4:05 p.m. CDT
- Elapsed time: 3 hours and 23 minutes
- Game attendance: 18,131
- Game weather: 84 °F (29 °C) • Weather: Clear • Wind: 13 S MPH
- Referee: Marshall Lewis
- Television network: ESPN+

Scoring summary
1	12:50	LA	Ja'Marcus Bradley 50-yard pass from Andre Nunez (Kyle Pfau kick) (6 plays, 75 yards, 2:10)	LA 7–0
1	09:36	LA	Jarrod Jackson 30-yard pass from Andre Nunez (Kyle Pfau kick) (6 plays, 55 yards, 2:00)	LA 14–0
1	08:39	NMSU	Jason Huntley 51-yard pass from Josh Adkins (Dylan Brown kick) (3 plays, 65 yards, 0:57)	LA 14–7
1	03:05	LA	Trey Ragas 11-yard pass from Andre Nunez (Kyle Pfau kick) (14 plays, 83 yards, 5:34)	LA 21–7
1	02:55	NMSU	Jason Huntley 87-yard kickoff returned (Dylan Brown kick) (0 plays, 0 yards, 0:00)	LA 21–14
1	02:04	LA	Earnest Patterson 79-yard pass from Levi Lewis (Kyle Pfau kick) (2 plays, 75 yards, 0:51)	LA 28–14
2	12:30	LA	Elijah Mitchell 31-yard rush (Kyle Pfau kick) (6 plays, 77 yards, 2:30)	LA 35–14
2	09:01	LA	Jarrod Jackson 22-yard pass from Andre Nunez (Kyle Pfau kick) (7 plays, 71 yards, 2:30)	LA 42–14
2	05:39	NMSU	Christian Gibson 3-yard rush (Dylan Brown kick) (10 plays, 75 yards, 3:22)	LA 42–21
2	00:11	LA	Kyle Pfau 30-yard field goal (13 plays, 78 yards, 5:28)	LA 45–21
3	10:31	NMSU	Dylan Brown 26-yard field goal (15 plays, 61 yards, 4:29)	LA 45–24
3	04:15	NMSU	Christian Gibson 2-yard rush (Dylan Brown kick) (10 plays, 80 yards, 3:34)	LA 45–31
3	01:59	LA	Ryheem Malone 31-yard pass from Andre Nunez (Kyle Pfau kick) (5 plays, 55 yards, 2:16)	LA 52–31
4	14:37	NMSU	Christian Gibson 11-yard rush (Dylan Brown kick) (7 plays, 73 yards, 2:22)	LA 52–38
4	12:39	LA	Elijah Mitchell 36-yard rush (Kyle Pfau kick) (5 plays, 63 yards, 1:58)	LA 59–38
4	09:48	LA	Elijah Mitchell 9-yard rush (Kyle Pfau kick) (5 plays, 40 yards, 2:22)	LA 66–38

Statistics	New Mexico State	Louisiana
First downs	26	37
Total yards	406	759
Rushing yards	122	344
Passing yards	284	415
Turnovers	2	1
Time of possession	21:52	38:08

Team	Category	Player	Statistics
New Mexico State	Passing	Josh Adkins	25–44, 284 yards, 1 TD, 1 INT
New Mexico State	Rushing	Jason Huntley	8 carries, 85 yards
New Mexico State	Receiving	Jason Huntley	5 receptions, 112 yards, 1 TD
Louisiana	Passing	Andre Nunez	19–25, 315 yards, 5 TDs
Louisiana	Rushing	Elijah Mitchell	12 carries, 107 yards, 3 TDs
Louisiana	Receiving	Earnest Patterson	3 receptions, 114 yards, 1 TD

=== At Appalachian State ===
Louisiana at Appalachian State

Team	1	2	3	4	Total
Ragin' Cajuns	7	3	0	7	17
• Mountaineers	7	10	7	3	27

- Date: October 20, 2018
- Location: Kidd Brewer Stadium
  Boone, NC
- Game start: 3:35 p.m. CDT
- Elapsed time: 3 hours and 5 minutes
- Game attendance: 27,082
- Game weather: 54 °F (12 °C) • Weather: partly cloudy • Wind: 15 MPH
- Referee: Kyle Olson
- Television network: ESPN+

Scoring summary
1	03:46	APST	Darrynton Evans 2-yard rush (Chandler Staton kick) (4 plays, 25 yards, 1:36)	APST 7–0
1	00:41	LA	Trey Ragas 38-yard pass from Levi Lewis (Kyle Pfau kick) (8 plays, 75 yards, 3:05)	TIE 7–7
2	13:10	APST	Chandler Staton 40-yard field goal (8 plays, 41 yards, 2:25)	APST 10–7
2	09:02	LA	Kyle Pfau 43-yard field goal (9 plays, 49 yards, 4:08)	TIE 10–10
2	02:11	APST	Darrynton Evans 20-yard pass from Zac Thomas (Chandler Staton kick) (10 plays, 73 yards, 5:17)	APST 17–10
3	14:01	APST	Marc Williams 6-yard rush (Chandler Staton kick) (3 plays, 73 yards, 0:59)	APST 24–10
4	02:46	APST	Chandler Staton 29-yard field goal (11 plays, 47 yards, 5:43)	APST 27–10
4	01:03	LA	Trey Ragas 27-yard rush (Kyle Pfau kick) (7 plays, 69 yards, 1:37)	APST 27–17

Statistics	Louisiana	Appalachian State
First downs	16	21
Total yards	328	372
Rushing yards	140	266
Passing yards	188	106
Turnovers	1	1
Time of possession	27:22	32:28

Team	Category	Player	Statistics
Louisiana	Passing	Andre Nunez	14–23, 108 yards
Louisiana	Rushing	Trey Ragas	18 carries, 81 yards, 1 TD
Louisiana	Receiving	Ryheem Malone	3 receptions, 47 yards
Appalachian State	Passing	Zac Thomas	10–20, 106 yards, 1 TD, 1 INT
Appalachian State	Rushing	Darrynton Evans	26 carries, 186 yards, 1 TD
Appalachian State	Receiving	Henry Pearson	2 receptions, 38 yards

=== Arkansas State ===
Arkansas State at Louisiana

Team	1	2	3	4	Total
Red Wolves	14	7	7	15	43
• Ragin' Cajuns	21	10	3	13	47

- Date: October 27, 2018
- Location: Cajun Field
  Lafayette, LA
- Game start: 6:05 p.m. CDT
- Elapsed time: 3 hours and 25 minutes
- Game attendance: 17,068
- Game weather: 74 °F (23 °C) • Weather: Clear • Wind: 7 SW MPH
- Referee: Jason Autrey
- Television network: ESPN+

Scoring summary
1	13:04	LA	Elijah Mitchell 64-yard pass from Andre Nunez (Kyle Pfau kick) (4 plays, 80 yards, 1:56)	LA 7–0
1	08:50	ARST	Warren Wand 1-yard rush (Blake Grupe kick) (9 plays, 75 yards, 4:14)	TIE 7–7
1	04:39	LA	Elijah Mitchell 65-yard rush (Kyle Pfau kick) (2 plays, 89 yards, 0:31)	LA 14–7
1	01:34	ARST	Marcel Murray 7-yard rush (Blake Grupe kick) (7 plays, 75 yards, 3:05)	TIE 14–14
1	01:13	LA	Raymond Calais 72-yard rush (Kyle Pfau kick) (1 play, 72 yards, 0:21)	LA 21–14
2	09:11	LA	Andre Nunez 1-yard rush (Kyle Pfau kick) (12 plays, 77 yards, 4:48)	LA 28–14
2	04:34	ARST	Justice Hansen 2-yard rush (Blake Grupe kick) (10 plays, 77 yards, 4:37)	LA 28–21
2	00:02	LA	Kyle Pfau 52-yard field goal (5 plays, 25 yards, 0:28)	LA 31–21
3	08:02	LA	Kyle Pfau 47-yard field goal (9 plays, 35 yards, 4:25)	LA 34–21
3	03:56	ARST	Marcel Murray 2-yard rush (Blake Grupe kick) (11 plays, 73 yards, 4:06)	LA 34–28
4	10:51	ARST	Kirk Merritt 73-yard pass from Justice Hansen (Blake Grupe kick) (1 play, 73 yards, 0:12)	ARST 35–34
4	08:47	LA	Jarrod Jackson 53-yard pass from Andre Nunez (Andre Nunez two–point conversion pass attempt failed) (5 plays, 79 yards, 2:04)	LA 40–35
4	05:48	ARST	Marcel Murray 7-yard rush (Warren Wand two–point conversion pass attempt failed) (7 plays, 72 yards, 2:59)	ARST 43–40
4	01:18	LA	Trey Ragas 2-yard rush (Kyle Pfau kick) (11 plays, 55 yards, 4:30)	LA 47–43

Statistics	Arkansas State	Louisiana
First downs	27	31
Total yards	478	547
Rushing yards	208	228
Passing yards	270	319
Turnovers	1	2
Time of possession	30:43	29:17

Team	Category	Player	Statistics
Arkansas State	Passing	Justice Hansen	17–30, 270 yards, 1 TD, 1 INT
Arkansas State	Rushing	Marcel Murray	19 carries, 121 yards, 3 TDs
Arkansas State	Receiving	Kirk Merritt	4 receptions, 122 yards, 1 TD
Louisiana	Passing	Andre Nunez	18–26, 295 yards, 2 TDs, 2 INTs
Louisiana	Rushing	Raymond Calais	7 carries, 121 yards, 1 TD
Louisiana	Receiving	Jarrod Jackson	4 receptions, 129 yards, 1 TD

=== At Troy ===
Louisiana at Troy

Team	1	2	3	4	Total
Ragin' Cajuns	3	0	13	0	16
• Trojans	10	13	3	0	26

- Date: November 3, 2018
- Location: Veterans Memorial Stadium
  Troy, AL
- Game start: 2:35 p.m. CDT
- Elapsed time: 3 hours and 2 minutes
- Game attendance: 24,631
- Game weather: 66 °F (19 °C) • Weather: Partly Cloudy • Wind: 3 SE MPH
- Referee: Marshall Lewis
- Television network: ESPN+

Scoring summary
1	09:37	TROY	Tyler Sumpter 29-yard field goal (10 plays, 63 yards, 5:23)	TROY 3–0
1	07:22	LA	Kyle Pfau 32-yard field goal (6 plays, 27 yards, 2:15)	TIE 3–3
1	06:38	TROY	Damion Willis 75-yard pass from Sawyer Smith (Tyler Sumpter kick) (1 play, 90 yards, 0:44)	TROY 10–3
2	09:03	TROY	B. J. Smith 12-yard rush (Tyler Sumpter kick) (2 play, 23 yards, 0:46)	TROY 17–3
2	03:11	TROY	Tyler Sumpter 42-yard field goal (8 play, 64 yards, 3:59)	TROY 20–3
2	00:00	TROY	Tyler Sumpter 20-yard field goal (9 play, 57 yards, 2:12)	TROY 23–3
3	11:29	LA	Trey Ragas 3-yard rush (Kyle Pfau kick) (8 play, 55 yards, 3:31)	TROY 23–10
3	05:10	TROY	Tyler Sumpter 49-yard field goal (10 play, 39 yards, 6:19)	TROY 26–10
3	00:39	LA	Trey Ragas 5-yard rush (Levi Lewis two-point conversion pass attempt failed) (9 plays, 65 yards, 4:31)	LA 26–16

Statistics	Louisiana	Troy
First downs	18	21
Total yards	270	427
Rushing yards	100	110
Passing yards	170	317
Turnovers	0	2
Time of possession	28:26	31:34

Team	Category	Player	Statistics
Louisiana	Passing	Andre Nunez	11–25, 126 yards, 2 INTs
Louisiana	Rushing	Trey Ragas	18 carries, 106 yards, 2 TDs
Louisiana	Receiving	Ja'Marcus Bradley	4 receptions, 67 yards
Troy	Passing	Sawyer Smith	18–22, 317 yards, 1 TD
Troy	Rushing	B. J. Smith	22 carries, 103 yards, 1 TD
Troy	Receiving	Damion Willis	10 receptions, 213 yards, 1 TD

=== Georgia State ===
Georgia State at Louisiana

Team	1	2	3	4	Total
Panthers	0	7	7	8	22
• Ragin' Cajuns	7	6	3	20	36

- Date: November 10, 2018
- Location: Cajun Field
  Lafayette, LA
- Game start: 4:05 p.m. CST
- Elapsed time: 2 hours and 55 minutes
- Game attendance: 14,945
- Game weather: 52 °F (11 °C) • Weather: Mostly Sunny • Wind: 10 N MPH
- Referee: Kyle Olson
- Television network: ESPN+

Scoring summary
1	04:31	LA	Raymond Calais 92-yard rush (Kyle Pfau kick) (1 play, 92 yards, 0:15)	LA 7–0
2	11:43	LA	Ryheem Malone 32-yard pass from Andre Nunez (Kyle Pfau kick failed) (7 plays, 80 yards, 3:09)	LA 13–0
2	00:14	GSU	Devin Gentry 13-yard pass from Aaron Winchester (Brandon Wright kick) (10 plays, 92 yards, 5:04)	LA 13–7
3	07:18	LA	Kyle Pfau 21-yard field goal (11 plays, 60 yards, 4:45)	LA 16–7
3	01:46	GSU	Demarcus Kirk 21-yard rush (Brandon Wright kick) (10 plays, 75 yards, 5:32)	LA 16–14
4	14:20	LA	Raymond Calais 26-yard rush (Kyle Pfau kick) (7 plays, 75 yards, 2:26)	LA 23–14
4	11:20	LA	Elijah Mitchell 1-yard rush (Kyle Pfau kick) (4 plays, 63 yards, 2:04)	LA 30–14
4	07:33	LA	Raymond Calais 5-yard rush (Andre Nunez two–point conversion pass attempt failed) (5 plays, 34 yards, 1:53)	LA 36–14
4	04:20	GSU	Aaron Winchester 3-yard rush (Diondre Champaign two–point conversion pass) (7 plays, 75 yards, 3:13)	LA 36–22

Statistics	Georgia State	Louisiana
First downs	19	22
Total yards	373	525
Rushing yards	252	355
Passing yards	121	170
Turnovers	1	0
Time of possession	31:15	28:45

Team	Category	Player	Statistics
Georgia State	Passing	Aaron Winchester	10–21, 121 yards, 1 TD, 1 INT
Georgia State	Rushing	Tra Barnett	15 carries, 82 yards
Georgia State	Receiving	Cornelius McCoy	2 receptions, 60 yards
Louisiana	Passing	Andre Nunez	14–19, 141 yards, 1 TD
Louisiana	Rushing	Raymond Calais	13 carries, 186 yards, 3 TDs
Louisiana	Receiving	Ryheem Malone	2 receptions, 54 yards, 1 TD

=== South Alabama ===
South Alabama at Louisiana

Team	1	2	3	4	Total
Jaguars	0	17	7	14	38
• Ragin' Cajuns	10	14	17	7	48

- Date: November 17, 2018
- Location: Cajun Field
  Lafayette, LA
- Game start: 4:05 p.m. CST
- Elapsed time: 3 hours and 20 minutes
- Game attendance: 15,168
- Game weather: 67 °F (19 °C) • Weather: Sunny • Wind: 2 SE MPH
- Referee: Marshall Lewis
- Television network: ESPN+

Scoring summary
1	10:35	LA	Kyle Pfau 23-yard field goal (10 plays, 69 yards, 4:25)	LA 3–0
1	09:15	LA	Ja'Marcus Bradley 17-yard pass from Andre Nunez (Kyle Pfau kick) (3 plays, 28 yards, 1:11)	LA 10–0
2	14:02	USA	Kawaan Baker 8-yard rush (Gavin Patterson kick) (20 plays, 80 yards, 10:13)	LA 10–7
2	04:38	USA	Gavin Patterson 31-yard field goal (15 plays, 55 yards, 7:30)	TIE 10–10
2	04:20	LA	Ja'Marcus Bradley 44-yard pass from Levi Lewis (Kyle Pfau kick) (1 play, 44 yards, 0:18)	LA 17–10
2	02:04	LA	Ja'Marcus Bradley 1-yard pass from Andre Nunez (Kyle Pfau kick) (5 plays, 54 yards, 2:16)	LA 24–10
2	00:11	USA	Jamarius Way 18-yard pass from Cole Garvin (Gavin Patterson kick) (13 plays, 75 yards, 1:53)	LA 24–17
3	10:51	USA	Tra Minter 5-yard rush (Gavin Patterson kick) (9 plays, 65 yards, 4:09)	TIE 24–24
3	10:12	LA	Elijah Mitchell 45-yard rush (Kyle Pfau kick) (3 plays, 53 yards, 0:39)	LA 31–24
3	05:38	LA	Kyle Pfau 41-yard field goal (4 plays, 8 yards, 1:34)	LA 34–24
3	00:13	LA	Elijah Mitchell 1-yard rush (Kyle Pfau kick) (9 plays, 70 yards, 3:36)	LA 41–24
4	07:25	USA	Kawaan Baker 13-yard rush (Gavin Patterson kick) (10 plays, 87 yards, 4:54)	LA 41–31
4	02:12	LA	Elijah Mitchell 3-yard rush (Kyle Pfau kick) (8 plays, 69 yards, 5:13)	LA 48–31
4	00:15	USA	Kawaan Baker 50-yard pass from Cole Garvin (Gavin Patterson kick) (6 plays, 79 yards, 1:57)	LA 48–38

Statistics	South Alabama	Louisiana
First downs	27	17
Total yards	477	407
Rushing yards	223	210
Passing yards	254	197
Turnovers	3	1
Time of possession	35:59	24:01

Team	Category	Player	Statistics
South Alabama	Passing	Cole Garvin	18–28, 254 yards, 2 TDs, 1 INT
South Alabama	Rushing	Tra Minter	23 carries, 87 yards, 1 TD
South Alabama	Receiving	Kawaan Baker	4 receptions, 80 yards, 1 TD
Louisiana	Passing	Andre Nunez	12–18, 153 yards, 2 TDs, 1 INT
Louisiana	Rushing	Elijah Mitchell	12 carries, 104 yards, 3 TDs
Louisiana	Receiving	Ja'Marcus Bradley	3 receptions, 62 yards, 3 TDs

=== At Louisiana–Monroe ===
Louisiana at Louisiana–Monroe

Team	1	2	3	4	Total
• Ragin' Cajuns	14	10	0	7	31
Warhawks	0	21	0	7	28

- Date: November 24, 2018
- Location: Malone Stadium
  Monroe, LA
- Game start: 2:05 p.m. CST
- Elapsed time: 3 hours and 14 minutes
- Game attendance: 18,167
- Game weather: 67 °F (19 °C) • Weather: Partly Cloudy • Wind: 6 SSE MPH
- Referee: Ted Pitts
- Television network: ESPN+

Scoring summary
1	13:32	LA	Ryheem Malone 40-yard pass from Andre Nunez (Kyle Pfau kick) (4 plays, 75 yards, 1:28)	LA 7–0
1	04:41	LA	Ja'Marcus Bradley 20-yard pass from Andre Nunez (Kyle Pfau kick) (11 plays, 90 yards, 5:41)	LA 14–0
2	14:25	ULM	Austin Vaughn 13-yard pass from Caleb Evans (Craig Ford kick) (11 plays, 59 yards, 5:16)	LA 14–7
2	11:40	LA	Trey Ragas 6-yard pass from Andre Nunez (Kyle Pfau kick) (7 plays, 65 yards, 2:45)	LA 21–7
2	09:14	ULM	Kayin White 5-yard rush (Craig Ford kick) (5 plays, 54 yards, 2:26)	LA 21–14
2	04:22	LA	Kyle Pfau 37-yard field goal (10 plays, 56 yards, 4:52)	LA 24–14
2	02:25	ULM	Corey Slaughter 66-yard interception returned (Craig Ford kick) (0 plays, 0 yards, 0:00)	LA 24–21
4	11:49	LA	Elijah Mitchell 40-yard pass from Levi Lewis (Kyle Pfau kick) (10 plays, 79 yards, 5:36)	LA 31–21
4	04:47	ULM	Marcus Green 30-yard pass from Caleb Evans (Craig Ford kick) (5 plays, 76 yards, 1:37)	LA 31–28

Statistics	Louisiana	Louisiana–Monroe
First downs	22	17
Total yards	453	344
Rushing yards	240	143
Passing yards	213	201
Turnovers	1	2
Time of possession	33:27	26:33

Team	Category	Player	Statistics
Louisiana	Passing	Andre Nunez	11–15, 148 yards, 3 TDs, 1 INT
Louisiana	Rushing	Trey Ragas	23 carries, 115 yards
Louisiana	Receiving	Ryheem Malone	6 receptions, 91 yards, 1 TD
Louisiana–Monroe	Passing	Caleb Evans	15–24, 201 yards, 2 TDs, 1 INT
Louisiana–Monroe	Rushing	Derrick Gore	11 carries, 79 yards
Louisiana–Monroe	Receiving	Marcus Green	6 receptions, 76 yards, 1 TD

=== At Appalachian State (Sun Belt Championship game) ===
Louisiana at Appalachian State

Team	1	2	3	4	Total
Ragin' Cajuns	3	3	10	3	19
• Mountaineers	7	7	6	10	30

- Date: December 1, 2018
- Location: Kidd Brewer Stadium
  Boone, NC
- Game start: 12:03 p.m. CST
- Elapsed time: 3 hours and 5 minutes
- Game attendance: 14,963
- Game weather: 44 °F (7 °C) • Weather: Rainy • Wind: Calm
- Referee: Ted Pitts
- Television network: ESPN

Scoring summary
1	10:13	LA	Kyle Pfau 37-yard field goal (9 plays, 55 yards, 4:47)	LA 3–0
1	05:56	APST	Marc Williams 1-yard rush (Chandler Staton kick) (1 play, 1 yard, 0:04)	APST 7–3
2	08:17	LA	Kyle Pfau 45-yard field goal (11 plays, 41 yards, 5:19)	APST 7–6
2	03:17	APST	Zac Thomas 25-yard rush (Chandler Staton kick) (9 plays, 75 yards, 5:00)	APST 14–6
3	12:19	APST	Chandler Staton 42-yard field goal (6 plays, 51 yards, 2:41)	APST 17–6
3	10:34	LA	Andre Nunez 8-yard rush (Kyle Pfau kick) (4 plays, 36 yards, 1:35)	APST 17–13
3	05:00	LA	Kyle Pfau 23-yard field goal (7 plays, 28 yards, 3:24)	APST 17–16
3	00:00	APST	Chandler Staton 42-yard field goal (10 plays, 52 yards, 4:56)	APST 20–16
4	11:43	APST	Zac Thomas 35-yard rush (Chandler Staton kick) (4 plays, 44 yards, 1:32)	APST 27–16
4	06:01	LA	Kyle Pfau 24-yard field goal (12 plays, 60 yards, 5:36)	APST 27–19
4	02:09	APST	Chandler Staton 43-yard field goal (7 plays, 50 yards, 3:52)	APST 30–19

Statistics	Louisiana	Appalachian State
First downs	16	13
Total yards	301	300
Rushing yards	216	225
Passing yards	85	75
Turnovers	2	0
Time of possession	31:30	28:30

Team	Category	Player	Statistics
Louisiana	Passing	Andre Nunez	10–21, 85 yards, 2 INTs
Louisiana	Rushing	Trey Ragas	16 carries, 101 yards
Louisiana	Receiving	Ja'Marcus Bradley	4 receptions, 41 yards
Appalachian State	Passing	Zac Thomas	6–13, 75 yards
Appalachian State	Rushing	Darrynton Evans	17 carries, 111 yards
Appalachian State	Receiving	Marc Williams	1 reception, 34 yards

=== Vs. Tulane (Cure Bowl) ===
Louisiana vs. Tulane

Team	1	2	3	4	Total
• Green Wave	21	3	3	14	41
Ragin' Cajuns	7	3	7	7	24

- Date: December 15, 2018
- Location: Camping World Stadium
  Orlando, FL
- Game start: 1:35 p.m. CST
- Elapsed time: 3 hours and 18 minutes
- Game attendance: 19,066
- Game weather: 67 °F (19 °C) • Weather: Cloudy • Wind: 9 WSW MPH
- Referee: Jon Noli
- Television network: CBS Sports Network

Scoring summary
1	12:25	LA	Raymond Calais 38-yard rush (Kyle Pfau kick) (6 plays, 75 yards, 2:35)	LA 7–0
1	09:49	TULN	Darius Bradwell 15-yard rush (Merek Glover kick) (7 plays, 75 yards, 2:36)	TIE 7–7
1	05:21	TULN	Terren Encalade 38-yard pass from Justin McMillan (Merek Glover kick) (6 plays, 55 yards, 2:59)	TULN 14–7
1	00:48	TULN	Amare Jones 1-yard rush (Merek Glover kick) (8 plays, 63 yards, 2:36)	TULN 21–7
2	10:14	TULN	Merek Glover 38-yard field goal (9 plays, 35 yards, 4:32)	TULN 24–7
2	00:00	LA	Kyle Pfau 43-yard field goal (4 plays, 11 yards, 0:23)	TULN 24–10
3	09:46	LA	Elijah Mitchell 3-yard rush (Kyle Pfau kick) (6 plays, 62 yards, 1:50)	TULN 24–17
3	02:58	TULN	Merek Glover 26-yard field goal (12 plays, 73 yards, 4:51)	TULN 27–17
4	10:16	LA	Jarrod Jackson 13-yard pass from Andre Nunez (Kyle Pfau kick) (4 plays, 56 yards, 1:04)	APST 27–24
4	03:49	TULN	Darius Bradwell 4-yard rush (Merek Glover kick) (13 plays, 75 yards, 6:27)	TULN 34–24
4	03:06	TULN	Justin McMillan 16-yard rush (Merek Glover kick) (4 plays, 19 yards, 0:22)	TULN 41–24

Statistics	Tulane	Louisiana
First downs	28	11
Total yards	482	258
Rushing yards	337	84
Passing yards	145	174
Turnovers	2	1
Time of possession	40:31	19:29

Team	Category	Player	Statistics
Tulane	Passing	Justin McMillan	11–18, 145 yards, 1 TD, 1 INT
Tulane	Rushing	Darius Bradwell	35 carries, 160 yards, 2 TDs
Tulane	Receiving	Terren Encalade	5 receptions, 93 yards, 1 TD
Louisiana	Passing	Andre Nunez	8–17, 136 yards, 1 TD
Louisiana	Rushing	Raymond Calais	3 carries, 41 yards, 1 TD
Louisiana	Receiving	Ryheem Malone	3 receptions, 59 yards
