= Roxborough =

Roxborough may refer to:

== Places ==
- Roxborough, Manchester, Jamaica
- Roxborough, Philadelphia, Pennsylvania, US, a neighborhood
- Roxborough, Trinidad and Tobago, Tobago Island, Republic of Trinidad and Tobago
- Roxborough Castle, Ireland
- Roxborough Park, Colorado, a census-designated place in Douglas County, Colorado, US
- Roxborough State Park, and National Natural Landmark, Colorado, US
- Roxborough Township, Ontario, Canada
- Roxborough Township, Pennsylvania, US

== People with the surname ==
- Charles A. Roxborough (1888–1963), American politician
- Elsie Roxborough (1914–1949), American socialite
- John Roxborough (academic administrator) (died 1509), Master of University College, Oxford
- John Roxborough (boxing manager) (1892–1975), American bookmaker, boxing manager and sports gambler
- Roxy Roxborough (born 1951), American author, teacher, lecturer

== Other ==
- HMS Roxborough (I07)

== See also ==
- Roxboro (disambiguation)
- Roxburgh (disambiguation)
- Roxbury (disambiguation)
