= John Roxborough =

John Roxborough may refer to:

- John Roxborough (academic administrator), master of University College, Oxford
- John Roxborough (boxing manager), American bookmaker, boxing manager and sports gambler

== See also ==
- John Roxburgh (disambiguation)
- John Roxborough Norman, English ichthyologist
