= Jessel Ourso =

American politician

Jessel Mitchell Ourso Sr.

Sheriff of Iberville Parish, Louisiana
- In office May 1, 1964 (suspended 1968-1972) – August 28, 1978
- Preceded by: Charles A. Griffon Jr.
- Succeeded by: Freddie H. Pitre

Personal details
- Born: March 28, 1932 Plaquemine, Louisiana, US
- Died: August 28, 1978 (aged 46) Houston, Texas, US
- Resting place: Grace Memorial Park in Plaquemine
- Party: Democratic
- Spouse: Eula May Ourso
- Occupation: Law-enforcement officer

Military service
- Branch/service: United States Army
- Battles/wars: Korean War

Jessel Mitchell Ourso Sr. (March 28, 1932 – August 28, 1978), was from 1964 to 1968 and from 1972 until his death in office, a popular, colorful Democratic sheriff of Iberville Parish, located near the capital city of Baton Rouge in South Louisiana. He is thus far the youngest person elected sheriff in Louisiana.

== Background ==
Ourso was the youngest of eleven children born to a Cajun couple, Rudolph and Ida Ourso of Plaquemine, Louisiana, the Iberville parish seat. He was a boxer at Plaquemine Senior High School, as were his friends and later political allies, state representative and then Lieutenant Governor Robert "Bobby" Freeman, school superintendent Sam Distefano, and District Attorney Sam Cashio. After high school graduation, Ourso served in the United States Army from 1952 to 1954, including fifteen months in combat in the Korean War. All seven of his brothers engaged in military service, a point which he emphasized in his political races.

Ourso was sometimes called "The Black Stallion", the name of the family trucking company. Ourso and his wife, the former Eula Mae Leblanc (1933-1996), had six children, Jessel M. Ourso Jr. (born 1953), Blane Michael Ourso (born 1955), Vesta Ourso Falcon, Jessica A. Ourso (born 1958), Lisa Jo Ourso (born 1959), and Shannon Paul Ourso (born 1964).

== Political life ==
Ourso worked for the Baton Rouge municipal police department and the Louisiana State Police before he was elected Iberville Parish sheriff at the age of thirty-one. He unseated the 16-year incumbent, Charles A. Griffon Jr., of Plaquemine, the paternal grandfather of the statewide radio talk show host, Moon Griffon of Monroe in northeastern Louisiana. Ourso claimed that he had won the Democratic primary election held on December 7, 1963, because he led by a plurality. A third candidate who had withdrawn from the race still received enough scattering of votes to prevent an Ourso majority. Louisiana Attorney General Jack P. F. Gremillion ruled that the votes for the withdrawn candidate still counted for purposes of determining if a candidate had a primary majority. Louisiana State District Judge G. R. Kearney ruled that the third candidate's votes would still be counted and that the runoff election between Ourso and Griffon must proceed on January 11, 1964, along with the gubernatorial contest between the successful John McKeithen and former New Orleans Mayor DeLesseps Story Morrison.

As sheriff, Ourso established the Iberville Parish "Junior Deputy" and prison work-release programs. He organized a sheriff's flotilla to cover swamplands and waterways. He introduced the psychological stress evaluator in the investigation of crimes. He established the first ambulance service in Iberville Parish and was the first Iberville Parish sheriff to use a helicopter. He built a firing range for deputies and opened it to the public. Ourso established sheriff's sub-stations with deputies on duty around the clock. He constructed a new $2 million jail, completed in 1977, the year before his death.

Despite his accomplishments, Ourso is also remembered for many controversies. The Louisiana Legislative Auditor accused him of failure to account for funds received from construction and engineering firms as payment of guard and security services that the sheriff's department had provided to the companies. Then state Attorney General Gremillion charged Ourso with ninety-six allegations of wrongdoing. Governor McKeithen suspended Ourso from office and refused his signature to the commission for Ourso to take office for his second term in the summer of 1968. From 1968 to 1971, Ourso fought federal charges of extortion and thirty-three state criminal allegations brought forth by Attorney General Jack Gremillion, including bribery, theft, extortion, and malfeasance. Ourso was either acquitted or benefited from hung juries in all of these cases.

Ourso was elected sheriff again in 1971 with the slogan that U.S. Senator Barry M. Goldwater of Arizona had employed in the 1964 U.S. presidential election: "In Your Heart, You Know He's Right." While continuing as sheriff, Ourso in 1972 was elected to the nonpartisan position of delegate to the 1973 Louisiana Constitutional Convention. Others elected to the convention were future Governor Buddy Roemer and subsequent Louisiana Secretary of State James H. "Jim" Brown.

On November 1, 1975, at the age of forty-three, Ourso defeated five challengers to win his last abbreviated term as sheriff in the first-ever nonpartisan blanket primary held in Louisiana.

== Legacy ==
Known for his public speaking, Ourso was described by Gary J. Hebert, the late publisher of the Post/South newspaper in Plaquemine, as "unequaled in color, startling in analogies, disarmingly devious in approach, and at times, just downright funny to the point of tears."

Ourso died in Houston, Texas, at the age of forty-six. According to the former Iberville South, four thousand mourners visited the funeral home where Ourso's body lay in state, two thousand came to St. John the Evangelist Catholic Church for the funeral mass, hundreds of others lined the route of the funeral procession, and eight hundred witnessed the burial at Grace Memorial Park in Plaquemine.

Ourso's older son, Jessel Mitchell Ourso Jr., known as Mitch Ourso, is the first and still serving President of Iberville Parish, having been initially elected to a two-year term in 1997. Mitch Ourso said that his mother had asked all of her children to avoid politics, and he did so until a year after her death when he "still rode my dad's political coattails into office as parish president. He was one popular politician in Iberville Parish."

In 2009, Ourso was inducted posthumously into the Louisiana Political Museum and Hall of Fame in Winnfield. Only four other sheriffs have been so designated, including Cat Doucet and Harry Lee. In 2010, he was inducted into the Louisiana Justice Hall of Fame by the Louisiana State Penitentiary Museum Foundation.

Preceded by Charles A. Griffon Jr.	Sheriff of Iberville Parish, Louisiana; 1964–1978 (Suspended 1968–1972)	Succeeded by Freddie H. Pitre
