= Roxburgh (surname) =

Roxburgh is a surname. It is an ancient Scottish surname, locational in origin, from the place called Roxburgh near Kelso in what is now the Borders council area of Scotland, formerly Roxburghshire.

Notable people with the surname include:

- Alec Roxburgh (1910–1985), Scottish footballer
- Andrew Ralph Roxburgh, Indonesian actor
- Andy Roxburgh (born 1943), Scottish footballer and manager
- Benjamin Roxburgh-Smith (1884–1951), British fighter ace
- Doug Roxburgh (born 1951), Canadian golfer
- Edwin Roxburgh (born 1937), English composer
- J. F. Roxburgh (1888–1954), British schoolmaster and author
- James William Roxburgh (1921–2007), Anglican Bishop of Barking
- Jim Roxburgh (disambiguation)
- John Roxburgh (disambiguation)
- Melissa Roxburgh (born 1992), Canadian actress
- Richard Roxburgh (born 1962), Australian actor
- William Roxburgh (1751–1815), Scottish surgeon and botanist, abbreviated as "Roxb."
