= Roxbury Park =

Roxbury Park may refer to:

- Luna Park, Johnstown, Pennsylvania
- Roxbury Heritage State Park, Boston, Massachusetts
- Roxbury Memorial Park, Beverly Hills, California
- West Roxbury Parkway, Boston, Massachusetts

== See also ==
- Roxbury (disambiguation)
