= Rosborough =

Surname list

Rosborough is the surname of the following people

- Henry Rosborough Swanzy (1843–1913), Irish ophthalmic surgeon
- Jim Rosborough (born 1944), American basketball coach
- Patty Rosborough, American stand-up comedian
- Samuel Rosborough Balcom (1888–1981), Canadian politician

== See also ==
- Roxborough (disambiguation)
