= Roxburgh (disambiguation) =

Roxburgh refers to an ancient town and county in Scotland.

Roxburgh may also refer to:

== Places ==
- Roxburgh (village), Scottish Borders, close to the ancient town
- Roxburghshire, former Scottish county
- Roxburgh Castle, ruined castle near Roxburgh, Scotland
- Roxburgh, New Zealand, a town in Otago
- Roxburgh County, New South Wales, Australia
- Roxburgh Park, Victoria, Australia

== Electoral districts ==
- Berwickshire, Roxburgh and Selkirk (UK Parliament constituency)
- Ettrick, Roxburgh and Berwickshire (Scottish Parliament constituency)
- Roxburgh and Berwickshire (UK Parliament constituency)
- Roxburgh and Berwickshire (Scottish Parliament constituency)
- Roxburgh, Selkirk and Peebles (UK Parliament constituency)
- Roxburgh and Selkirk (UK Parliament constituency)
- Roxburghshire (UK Parliament constituency)
- Roxburghshire (Parliament of Scotland constituency)

== Other uses ==
- Roxburgh (surname)
- Duke of Roxburghe
- HMS Roxburgh, Royal Navy cruiser

== Different spelling ==
- Claes Roxbergh (born 1945), Swedish politician

== See also ==
- Roxboro (disambiguation)
- Roxborough (disambiguation)
- Roxbury (disambiguation)
- Roxburghshire
