= East Iberville Elementary and High School =

Location
- 3285 Highway 75; St. Gabriel, Louisiana 70776; United States; 30°15′39″N 91°06′13″W

Information
- Type: Public school
- School board: Iberville Parish School Board
- Teaching staff: 83.72 (on an FTE basis)
- Grades: PK-12
- Enrollment: 749 (2023-24)
- Student to teacher ratio: 8.95
- Colors: Red and gold
- Mascot: Tiger
- Nickname: Tigers
- Website: eis.ipsb.net

East Iberville Elementary and High School is a PK-12 combined elementary through high school in St. Gabriel, Louisiana. It is a part of the Iberville Parish School Board.

As of 2013 it, along with one other school, Mathematics, Science, and Arts Academy - East (MSA East), also in St. Gabriel, serves the portion of Iberville Parish on the east bank of the Mississippi River, which has fewer residents compared to the west bank.

== History ==
It was previously known as Sunshine High School.

A White American named Maria S. Delouise was the school's principal until March 2010. In 2011, she filed a lawsuit against the school district in federal court, accusing it of removing her from the job so an African American could have it.

In a five-year period ending in 2013, around 56% of the students at East Iberville and MSA East performed at or above grade level, and the Louisiana State Department of Education consistently gave both schools "C" ratings. For these reasons, St. Gabriel city officials that year suggested seceding from Iberville schools.

== Enrollment ==
As of 2013 this school and MSA East together had over 60 employees and about 600 students.

== Athletics ==
East Iberville High competes in the Louisiana High School Athletic Association.
