= Iberville Parish School Board =

School district in Louisiana, United States

Coordinates: 30.2892°N 91.2373°W

Iberville Parish School Board (IPSB) is a school district headquartered in Plaquemine, Louisiana, United States. The district serves Iberville Parish.

== History ==
In 2013, officials from the City of St. Gabriel and residents of the adjacent east bank portion of Iberville Parish expressed concern that local schools were not receiving adequate attention or resources from the Iberville Parish School Board. At the time, both East Iberville Elementary and High School and the Mathematics, Science, and Arts Academy - East served students on the east bank of the Mississippi River, a less populous area of the parish compared with the west bank, and had historically lower standardized performance ratings and fewer facilities than schools in other parts of the district. As a result, city officials and community members argued for the possibility of establishing a separate school district, suggesting that St. Gabriel should secede from the parish system if the perceived disparities could not be resolved. These discussions reflected broader concerns about school governance, equitable distribution of resources, and local control, although no formal secession ultimately took place.

== School uniforms ==
The district requires all students to wear school uniforms.

== Schools ==
=== PreK-12 schools ===
- East Iberville Elementary and High School (St. Gabriel)

Magnets:

- Mathematics, Science, and Arts Academy - East (St. Gabriel)
- Mathematics, Science, and Arts Academy - West (Plaquemine)

=== 7-12 schools ===
- Plaquemine Senior High School (Unincorporated area, near Plaquemine)
- White Castle High School (White Castle)

=== PreK-8 schools ===
- Crescent Elementary & Junior High School (Unincorporated area)

=== 4-8 schools ===
- Edward J. Gay Middle School (Unincorporated area)

=== PreK-6 schools ===
- Dorseyville Elementary School (Unincorporated area)

=== PreK-4 schools ===
- Iberville Elementary School (Plaquemine)
- North Iberville Elementary School (Rosedale)

== Former schools ==
- North Iberville Elementary and High School (Rosedale)
