= Roxboro =

Roxboro is the name of several places:

- Roxboro, Quebec, now part of the Pierrefonds-Roxboro borough of Montreal, Quebec, Canada
- Roxboro, North Carolina, United States of America
- Roxboro, Limerick, a townland in Co Limerick, Ireland
- Roxboro, Calgary, a neighbourhood of Calgary, Alberta, Canada

== See also ==
- Roxborough (disambiguation)
- Roxburgh (disambiguation)
- Roxbury (disambiguation)
