= Davon Godchaux =

American football player (born 1994)

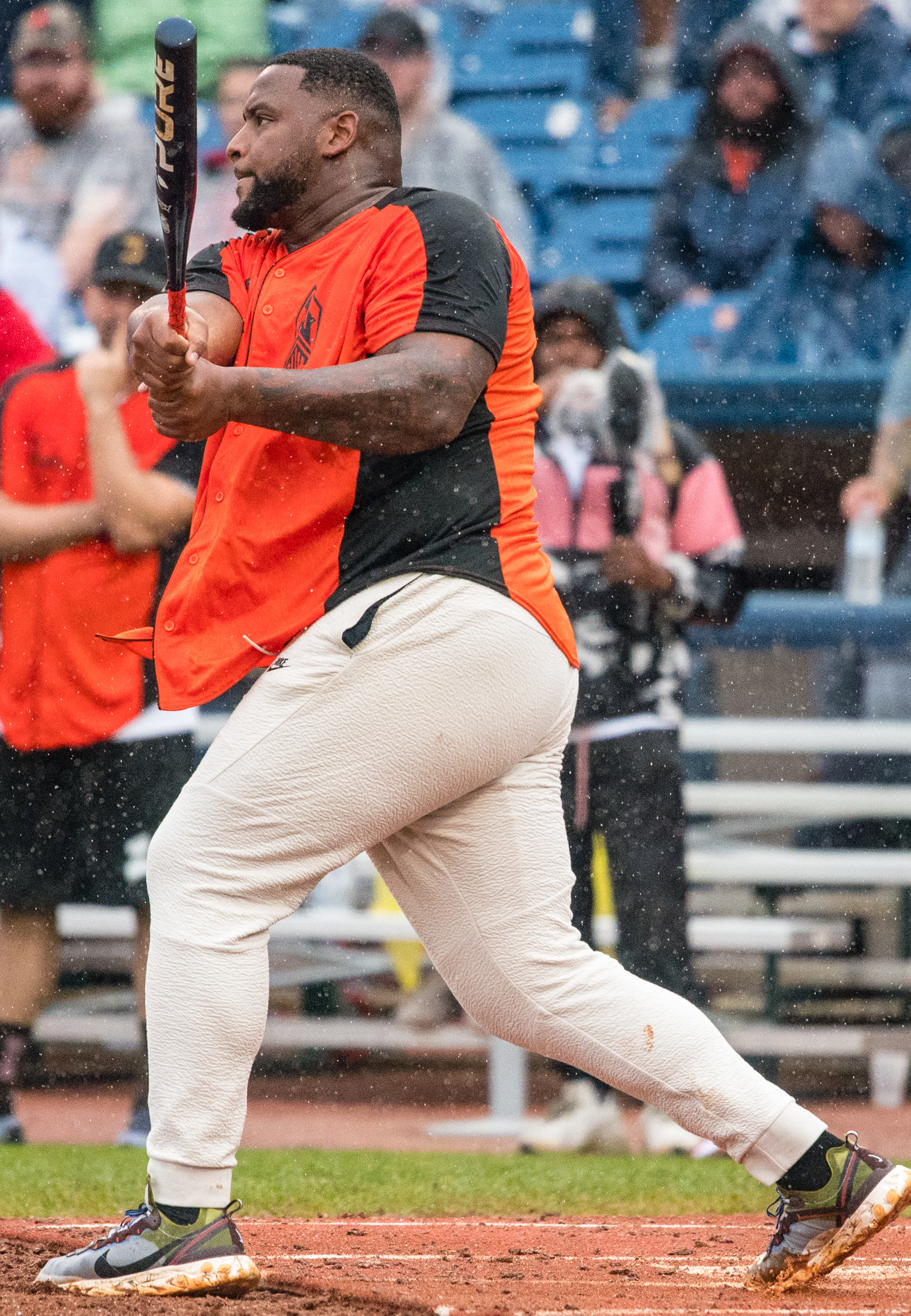
- Godchaux in 2019

No. 94 – Jacksonville Jaguars
- Position: Defensive tackle
- Roster status: Active

Personal information
- Born: November 11, 1994 (age 32); Plaquemine, Louisiana, U.S.
- Listed height: 6 ft 3 in (1.91 m)
- Listed weight: 305 lb (138 kg)

Career information
- High school: Plaquemine
- College: LSU (2014–2016)
- NFL draft: 2017: 5th round, 178th overall pick

Career history
- Miami Dolphins (2017–2020); New England Patriots (2021–2024); New Orleans Saints (2025–2026); Jacksonville Jaguars (2026–present)

Career NFL statistics as of Week 5, 2026
- Total tackles: 485
- Sacks: 5.5
- Forced fumbles: 3
- Fumble recoveries: 1
- Pass deflections: 3
- Stats at Pro Football Reference

Davon Montel Godchaux (/dəˈvɒn ˈɡɒdtʃɔː/ də-VON GOD-chaw; born November 11, 1994) is an American professional football defensive tackle for the Jacksonville Jaguars of the National Football League (NFL). He played college football for the LSU Tigers from 2014 to 2016. He was selected by the Miami Dolphins in the fifth round of the 2017 NFL draft, and played for the team from 2017 to 2020.

== Early life ==
A native of Plaquemine, Louisiana, Godchaux attended Plaquemine Senior High School, where he was an All-State defensive lineman. He compiled 60 tackles, 22 tackles for a loss, and 4.5 sacks in his junior season in 2012, which earned him first-team All-State honors for Class 4A. In the season opener of his senior year, he tore his anterior cruciate ligament, causing him to miss the rest of the season. Nonetheless he was honored as a U.S. Army All-American and attended the bowl game. Regarded as a four-star recruit, Godchaux was ranked as the No. 22 defensive end prospect by ESPN. He chose LSU over offers from Mississippi, Auburn, and UCLA, among others.

== College career ==
At LSU, Godchaux started 26 games for the Tigers in three seasons. He took over as a starter after three games into his true freshman season in 2014, and he has served as a rotating player at defensive end in LSU’s 3–4 defense. As a junior, Godchaux recorded 62 tackles, 8.5 tackles for loss, 6.5 sacks, one pass defensed, and two fumble recoveries. He declared for the 2017 NFL draft the day after the 2016 Citrus Bowl.

== Professional career ==
=== Pre-draft ===
Godchaux pulled a hamstring during the NFL Combine and could not complete all drills.

Pre-draft measurables
Height	Weight	Arm length	Hand span	Wingspan	40-yard dash	10-yard split	20-yard split	20-yard shuttle	Three-cone drill	Vertical jump	Broad jump	Bench press
6 ft 3 3/8 in (1.91 m)	310 lb (141 kg)	32 3/8 in (0.82 m)	10 1/4 in (0.26 m)	6 ft 6 1/2 in (1.99 m)	5.27 s	1.83 s	3.04 s	4.91 s	7.82 s	29.5 in (0.75 m)	8 ft 8 in (2.64 m)	22 reps
All values from 2017 NFL Combine/Pro Day

=== Miami Dolphins ===
Godchaux was drafted by the Miami Dolphins in the fifth round, 178th overall, in the 2017 NFL draft.

Godchaux was placed on the reserve/COVID-19 list by the team on August 5, 2020, and was activated from the list two days later. He was placed on injured reserve on October 16, 2020.

=== New England Patriots ===
Godchaux signed a two-year contract with the New England Patriots on March 23, 2021. He signed a contract extension with the team on July 27, 2022.

On July 31, 2024, Godchaux and the Patriots agreed to a two–year, $16.5 million contract extension.

=== New Orleans Saints ===
On March 12, 2025, Godchaux was traded to the New Orleans Saints.

=== Jacksonville Jaguars ===
On November 9, 2026, Godchaux was traded to the Jacksonville Jaguars in exchange for a conditional sixth-round pick.

== NFL career statistics ==
Legend
**Bold**	Career high

=== Regular season ===
Year	Team	Games		Tackles					Interceptions						Fumbles				
Year	Team	GP	GS	Cmb	Solo	Ast	Sck	TFL	Int	Yds	Avg	Lng	TD	PD	FF	Fmb	FR	Yds	TD
2017	MIA	15	5	40	26	14	0.0	1	0	0	0.0	0	0	**1**	**1**	0	0	0	0
2018	MIA	16	16	48	31	17	1.0	**6**	0	0	0.0	0	0	0	0	0	0	0	0
2019	MIA	16	16	**75**	**33**	42	**2.0**	4	0	0	0.0	0	0	**1**	0	0	0	0	0
2020	MIA	5	5	16	10	6	0.0	1	0	0	0.0	0	0	0	0	0	0	0	0
2021	NE	17	16	65	32	33	1.0	2	0	0	0.0	0	0	0	**1**	0	0	0	0
2022	NE	17	17	62	25	37	1.5	3	0	0	0.0	0	0	0	0	0	0	0	0
2023	NE	17	17	56	24	32	0.0	2	0	0	0.0	0	0	0	0	0	**1**	0	0
2024	NE	17	17	67	24	**43**	0.0	1	0	0	0.0	0	0	**1**	0	0	0	0	0
2025	NO	17	14	43	14	29	0.0	2	0	0	0.0	0	0	0	**1**	0	0	0	0
2026	NO	5	5	13	4	9	0.0	1	0	0	0.0	0	0	0	0	0	0	0	0
Career		142	128	485	223	262	5.5	23	0	0	0.0	0	0	3	3	0	1	0	0

=== Postseason ===
Year	Team	Games		Tackles					Interceptions						Fumbles				
Year	Team	GP	GS	Cmb	Solo	Ast	Sck	TFL	Int	Yds	Avg	Lng	TD	PD	FF	Fmb	FR	Yds	TD
2021	NE	1	1	1	1	0	0.0	0	0	0	0.0	0	0	0	0	0	0	0	0
Career		1	1	1	1	0	0.0	0	0	0	0.0	0	0	0	0	0	0	0	0

== Personal life ==
Godchaux has a son.

In 2022, he began dating former model Chanel Iman. The couple announced they were engaged on May 30, 2023. Iman gave birth to their daughter Capri on September 19, 2023. The couple married in a civil ceremony in New York on 10 January 2024 then island hopped with family in the Caribbean and had another ceremony.
