= Mathematics, Science, and Arts Academy - West =

School in Louisiana, USA

Coordinates: 30.2626°N 91.2169°W

Mathematics, Science, and Arts Academy - West or MSA West is a public K-12 school in unincorporated Iberville Parish, Louisiana, near Plaquemine. It is a part of the Iberville Parish School Board and serves the portion of the parish on the west bank of the Mississippi River, which is the more populated section.

As of 2013 1,300 students were enrolled at MSA West. Circa 2013 a renovation of $20 million was scheduled. At the time residents on the east bank complained that their schools were not getting renovations, while the leadership of the district argued that the school had four times the enrollment of MSA East and therefore needed more funding allocated to its renovation.
