= Rosedale, Louisiana =

- Village
- Location of Rosedale in Iberville Parish, Louisiana

- Location of Louisiana in the United States
- Coordinates: 30°26′34″N 91°27′36″W
- Country: United States
- State: Louisiana
- Parish: Iberville

Area
  - Total: 7.78 sq mi (20.15 km^{2})
  - Land: 7.78 sq mi (20.15 km^{2})
  - Water: 0 sq mi (0.00 km^{2})
- Elevation: 16 ft (4.9 m)

Population (2020)
  - Total: 664
  - Density: 85.3/sq mi (32.95/km^{2})
- Time zone: UTC-6 (CST)
  - Summer (DST): UTC-5 (CDT)
- Area code: 225
- FIPS code: 22-66060
- GNIS feature ID: 2407539
- Website: www.rosedalela.com

Rosedale is a village in Iberville Parish, Louisiana, United States. The population was 664 in 2020. It is part of the Baton Rouge metropolitan statistical area.

== Geography ==
Rosedale is located in northern Iberville Parish at 30°26′24″N 91°27′42″W (30.439929, -91.461588). It is bordered to the south by the village of Grosse Tete, and Bayou Grosse Tete flows through the center of Rosedale.

Louisiana Highways 76 and 77 intersect at the center of Rosedale. LA 76 leads east 16 miles (26 km) to Port Allen across the Mississippi River from Baton Rouge, and west 3.5 miles (5.6 km) to a point near Ramah and Interstate 10. LA 77, following Bayou Grosse Tete, leads northwest 6 miles (10 km) to Maringouin and southeast 2 miles (3 km) to Interstate 10 at Grosse Tête.

According to the United States Census Bureau, Rosedale has a total area of 7.8 square miles (20.1 km^{2}), all land.

== Demographics ==
Historical population
Census	Pop.	Note	%±
1960	674		—
1970	621		−7.9%
1980	658		6.0%
1990	807		22.6%
2000	753		−6.7%
2010	793		5.3%
2020	664		−16.3%
2025 (est.)	635	▼	−4.4%
U.S. Decennial Census

Rosedale racial composition as of 2020
Race	Number	Percentage
White (non-Hispanic)	385	57.98%
Black or African American (non-Hispanic)	255	38.4%
Native American	1	0.15%
Asian	4	0.6%
Other/Mixed	16	2.41%
Hispanic or Latino	3	0.45%

As of the 2020 United States census, there were 664 people, 338 households, and 221 families residing in the village.

== Education ==
Residents are served by the Iberville Parish School Board. Residents are zoned to North Iberville Elementary School and Plaquemine High School. North Iberville Elementary and High School previously served the community, but North Iberville High School closed in 2009 despite a parental movement to keep the school open. Parents criticized the rezoning to Plaquemine High because of the long distances involved.

In 2022, the Iberville Parish School board voted to reopen North Iberville High School. The high school will be integrated with the Iberville STEM Academy. Students returned to North Iberville High School in the fall of 2022.

== See also ==
- Episcopal Church of the Nativity (Rosedale, Louisiana)
