= Lee Meitzen Grue =

American poet (1934–2021)

- Born: February 8, 1934; Plaquemine, Louisiana, U.S.
- Died: April 3, 2021 (aged 87); New Orleans, Louisiana, U.S.
- Education: University of New Orleans (BA); Warren Wilson College (MFA)
- Occupations: Poet, novelist
- Years active: 1972–2021
- Spouse: Ronald David Grue (married 1963–2000)
- Children: 3

Lee Meitzen Grue (February 8, 1934 – April 3, 2021) was an American poet and educator. She was the founder and director of the New Orleans Poetry Forum, and has been referred to as that city's unofficial poet laureate. She was editor of the literary journal The New Laurel Review.

== Early life ==
She was born in Plaquemine, Louisiana and lived most of her life in New Orleans. At a young age, Grue fell in love with books and poetry, particularly The Golden Treasury by Louis Untermeyer, which featured female poets. Inspired by the poetry, Grue decided to become a poet herself. She graduated from Sophie B. Wright High School in 1951. She received a Bachelor of Arts in English from the University of New Orleans in 1963 and a Master of Fine Arts from Warren Wilson College in 1982.

== Career ==
In the early 1960s, Grue began reading her poetry at The Quorum Club, the first non-segregated coffee house in the South. During her time at the club, she met Eluard Burt, who she collaborated with over many years, including on the CD of jazz poetry titled Live! on Frenchmen Street. Ms. Grue founded the New Orleans Poetry Forum in 1972, where she was director until 1990. For many years she promoted poetry readings at her home, establishing there the Backyard Poetry Theater. Starting in 1982, she edited the international independent literary journal, The New Laurel Review which is still published today.

Grue was a visiting writer at Tulane University from 1993 to 1998. Following Hurricane Katrina, she began teaching fiction and poetry at the Alvar Branch of the New Orleans Public Library.

Grue was co-owner of BJ's Lounge in the Bywater neighborhood of New Orleans with her son, Teal Grue. The bar regularly hosts readings by local poets.

== Personal life ==
Lee Meitzen married Ronald David Grue on October 28, 1963, and they were divorced on September 5, 2000. The couple had three children: Celeste, Ian, and Teal.

Grue died on April 3, 2021, at her home in the Bywater neighborhood of New Orleans. She is survived by her children and four grandchildren.

== Awards and honors ==
- Albert Nelson Marquis Lifetime Achievement Award (2018)
- Poetry and Short Story Award from the Deep South Writer Association (1994)
- Short Story Award (second place) from Deep South Writer's Conference (1989)
- Syndicated Fiction Award from PEN (1984)

=== Fellowships ===
- Visiting scholar, Newcomb Center for Research on Women (2003– )
- Ledig House (1998)
- Virginia Center of Creative Arts (1986, 1988, 1991)
- Senior Fellow, National Education Association (1984–85)

== Works ==
- Mending for Memory: Sewing in Louisiana (edited by Lee Meitzen Grue and Susan Tucker, 2017)
- Blood at the Root: A Novel (2015)
- Downtown (2011)
- Three Poets in New Orleans (in collaboration with Biljana D. Obradović and Patricia A. Ward, 2000)
- Live!: On Frenchman Street (sound recording with Eluard Burt, as the New Orleans Jazz and Poetry Ensemble, 2000)
- Goodbye Silver, Silver Cloud (1994)
- In the Sweet Balance of the Flesh (1990)
- French Quarter Poems (1979)
- Trains and Other Intrusions: A Chapbook of Poetry (1974)

=== Notable poems ===
- "In the Garden" (September 4, 2012)
- "Snug Harbor" (October 4, 2011)
- "The Old Ice House on Chartres Street" (May 2, 2011)
- "The Catahoula Hound Visits the Dream of Jean Pierre" (January 10, 2011)
