= Dontayvion Wicks =

American football player (born 2001)

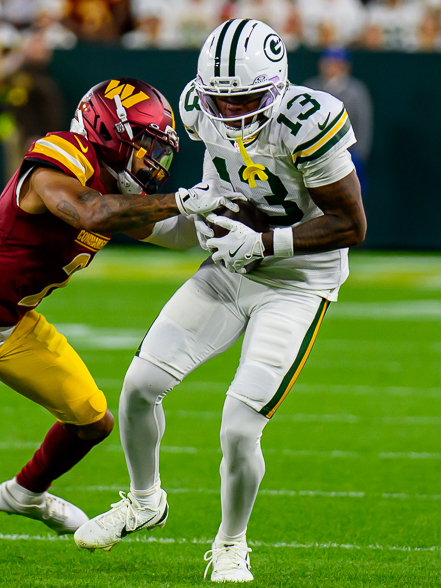
- Wicks with the Green Bay Packers in 2025

No. 13 – Philadelphia Eagles
- Position: Wide receiver
- Roster status: Injured reserve

Personal information
- Born: June 16, 2001 (age 25); Plaquemine, Louisiana, U.S.
- Listed height: 6 ft 1 in (1.85 m)
- Listed weight: 206 lb (93 kg)

Career information
- High school: Plaquemine
- College: Virginia (2019–2022)
- NFL draft: 2023: 5th round, 159th overall pick

Career history
- Green Bay Packers (2023–2025); Philadelphia Eagles (2026–present)

Awards and highlights
- First-team All-ACC (2021)

Career NFL statistics as of Week 5, 2026
- Receptions: 125
- Receiving yards: 1,588
- Receiving touchdowns: 12
- Stats at Pro Football Reference

Dontayvion Jaquain Wicks (born June 16, 2001) is an American professional football wide receiver for the Philadelphia Eagles of the National Football League (NFL). He played college football for the Virginia Cavaliers, and was selected by the Green Bay Packers in the fifth round of the 2023 NFL draft.

== Early life ==
Wicks attended Plaquemine High School in Plaquemine, Louisiana. He played wide receiver and quarterback in high school. He committed to the University of Virginia to play college football.

== College career ==
As a true freshman at Virginia in 2019, Wicks played in 10 games and had three receptions for 61 yards and a touchdown. He missed the 2020 season due to an injury suffered before the season. In 2021, Wicks started 11 of 12 games, recording 57 receptions for a school-record 1,203 yards and nine touchdowns. He was selected First Team All-Atlantic Coast Conference for the year 2021.

== Professional career ==
Pre-draft measurables
Height	Weight	Arm length	Hand span	Wingspan	40-yard dash	10-yard split	20-yard split	20-yard shuttle	Three-cone drill	Vertical jump	Broad jump
6 ft 1 3/8 in (1.86 m)	206 lb (93 kg)	32 3/8 in (0.82 m)	10 in (0.25 m)	6 ft 7 7/8 in (2.03 m)	4.58 s	1.63 s	2.63 s	4.20 s	6.91 s	39.0 in (0.99 m)	10 ft 10 in (3.30 m)
All values from NFL Combine/Pro Day

=== Green Bay Packers ===
Wicks was selected by the Green Bay Packers in the fifth round (159th overall) of the 2023 NFL draft. He signed his rookie contract on May 5.

Wicks made his NFL debut on September 10, 2023, during a 38–20 win against the Chicago Bears, but did not catch either of his two targets. He scored his first NFL touchdown on September 17 during a 25–24 loss to the Atlanta Falcons, on a 32-yard pass from Jordan Love. In Week 18, against the Bears, he had his first multi-touchdown game. As a rookie, Wicks had 39 receptions for 581 yards and four touchdowns. On January 14, 2024, Wicks logged his first postseason touchdown against the Dallas Cowboys, in a Packers 48–32 Wild Card Round victory.

In Week 4 of the 2024 season, Wicks had two receiving touchdowns against the Minnesota Vikings. In the 2024 season, Wicks compiled 39 receptions for 415 yards and five touchdowns.

Wicks made 14 appearances (including seven starts) for Green Bay during the 2025 campaign, recording 30 receptions for 332 yards and two touchdowns.

=== Philadelphia Eagles ===
On April 11, 2026, the Packers traded Wicks to the Philadelphia Eagles in exchange for a 2026 fifth-round pick (No. 153: Jager Burton) and a 2027 sixth-round pick. Wicks subsequently agreed to a one-year, $12.5 million contract extension with the Eagles.

== NFL career statistics ==
Legend
**Bold**	Career high

=== Regular season ===
Year	Team	Games		Receiving					Rushing					Fumbles	
Year	Team	GP	GS	Rec	Yds	Avg	Lng	TD	Att	Yds	Avg	Lng	TD	Fum	Lost
2023	GB	15	6	39	**581**	**14.9**	35	4	1	1	1.0	1	0	**3**	**1**
2024	GB	**17**	5	39	415	10.6	**36**	**5**	0	0	0	0	0	0	0
2025	GB	14	**7**	30	332	11.1	30	2	1	**6**	**6.0**	**6**	0	0	0
2026	PHI	5	5	17	260	15.3	64	1	0	0	0.0	0	0	0	0
Career		51	23	125	1,588	12.7	36	13	2	7	3.5	6	0	3	1
Source: pro-football-reference.com

=== Postseason ===
Year	Team	Games		Receiving					Rushing					Fumbles	
Year	Team	GP	GS	Rec	Yds	Avg	Lng	TD	Att	Yds	Avg	Lng	TD	Fum	Lost
2023	GB	**2**	**2**	**2**	25	12.5	20	**1**	0	0	0	0	0	0	0
2024	GB	1	1	**2**	**39**	**19.5**	**29**	0	0	0	0	0	0	0	0
Career		3	3	4	64	16.0	29	1	0	0	0	0	0	0	0
Source: pro-football-reference.com
