= North Iberville Elementary and High School =

Defunct school in Louisiana, USA

Coordinates: 30.4580°N 91.4792°W

Information
- Established: 2022; 4 years ago (re-opening)
- Closed: 2009 (original closure)
- Grades: K-12

North Iberville Elementary and High School is a K-12 school in Rosedale, Louisiana. Both schools are a part of the Iberville Parish School Board. North Iberville Elementary serves grades K-6 and North Iberville High School serves grades 7–12.

North Iberville High School closed in 2009 despite a parental movement to keep the school open. Students were rezoned to Plaquemine High School. Parents and Rosedale community members sued the parish to try to keep the school open. In 2015, Rosedale community members made plans to start C.S. King College Preparatory Academy, a grade 7-12 charter school.

North Iberville High School reopened in the fall of 2022 after a vote was held by the Iberville Parish School Board. The high school will be merged with the current Iberville STEM Academy.
