= Charles A. Roxborough =

American politician (1888–1963)

Charles A. Roxborough III
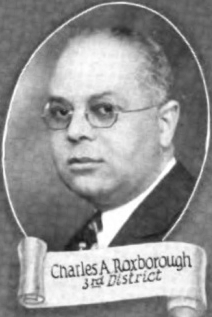

Member of the Michigan Senate from the 3rd district
- In office January 1, 1931 – 1932

Personal details
- Born: November 25, 1888 Plaquemine, Louisiana, U.S.
- Died: October 8, 1963 (aged 74) Michigan, U.S.
- Party: Republican
- Spouse(s): Cassandra Pease (m. 1913); Lottie Grady (m. 1919; div. 1939); Hazel A. Lyman
- Children: 4 (including Elsie)
- Education: Detroit College of Law

Charles Anthony Roxborough III (November 25, 1888 – October 8, 1963) was an American politician and attorney. A Republican, he was the first African-American man elected to the Michigan Senate. He was the father of Detroit writer and socialite Elsie Roxborough.

== Early life and education ==
Roxborough was born in Plaquemine, Louisiana on November 25, 1888 to parents Charles Anthony Roxborough (1856-1908) and Virginia Gertrude Roxborough (1863-1935). The senior Charles, a native of Cleveland, Ohio was of European and African descent and was born free. He became prominent in law and politics in New Orleans, where he met and married Virginia Simms, also of Creole European and African descent, in 1886. The younger Charles was one of four children born to the couple, including Thomas Simms (1889-1920), John Walter (1892-1975), and Claude (1893-1955).

In 1899, for the sake of his children, the elder Charles moved his family out of the South to Detroit, where the family became even more prominent, spawning five generations of lawyers. Charles and other members of the family were described as "mulatto," the slave-era term for biracial. The family were notably light-skinned owing to their white ancestry.

Roxborough graduated from Detroit public schools. Roxborough went on to graduate from Detroit College of Law.

== Career ==
Roxborough practiced law in Detroit. In 1922, Roxborough unsuccessfully ran for the Michigan Senate seat representing the 3rd district. On November 4, 1930, Roxborough was elected to the Michigan Senate where he represented the 3rd district from January 7, 1931 to 1932. Roxborough was not re-elected in 1932. In 1932, Roxborough was a delegate to Michigan convention to ratify 21st amendment from the Wayne County 1st District.

Roxborough unsuccessfully ran for the United States House of Representatives seat representing Michigan's 1st district in 1934, 1936, and 1938. Roxborough was a delegate to the Republican National Convention from Michigan in 1936, 1940, and 1944.

== Personal life ==
Roxborough married three times, to Cassandra Pease of Hamilton, Ontario in 1913, Charlotte "Lottie" Grady in 1919, and Hazel A. Lyman, an official at Detroit Recorder’s Court, in 1944. Elsie and Virginia were born to Charles and Cassandra, but Cassandra died shortly after Virginia's birth. Another two children, Charles IV (aka "Sonny") and John Walter, were born to Charles and Lottie.

Roxborough's brother John was a boxing manager whose most famous client was Joe Louis.

== Death ==
Roxborough died in Michigan on October 8, 1963.
