= Mathematics, Science, and Arts Academy - East =

Magnet school in Louisiana, United States

Coordinates: 30.2893°N 91.1127°W

Mathematics, Science, and Arts Academy - East or MSA-East Academy is a magnet K-12 school in St. Gabriel, Louisiana. It is a part of the Iberville Parish School Board. It opened on the ground of six temporary buildings of the St. Gabriel Community Center in August 2008 and moved to permanent quarters in August 2011.

As of 2013 it, along with one other school, East Iberville School, also in St. Gabriel, serves the portion of Iberville Parish on the east bank of the Mississippi River, which has fewer residents compared to the west bank.

== History ==
In 2010, George Grace, then the mayor of St. Gabriel, perceived the district as being malingering in building the school; he told the district that he intended to start a campaign for the City of St. Gabriel to establish its own school district separate from that of the parish.

In 2013 St. Gabriel and East Bank residents complained about the district not giving a cafeteria to and instead giving improvements to Mathematics, Science, and Arts Academy - West (MSA West). In a five-year period ending in 2013, around 56% of the students at MSA East and East Iberville performed at or above grade level, and the Louisiana State Department of Education consistently gave both schools "C" ratings. For these reasons, St. Gabriel city officials that year suggested seceding from Iberville schools.

== Operations ==
As of 2013 the school does not have its own on-site cafeteria but instead gets food trucked from East Iberville's elementary section; Terry L. Jones of The Advocate reported that the school community unsuccessfully campaigned to the district for it to build a cafeteria..

== Enrollment ==
As of 2013 this school and East Iberville together had over 60 employees and about 600 students.
