= Elsie Roxborough =

Detroit socialite (1914–1949)

Elsie Patricia Roxborough
- Born: 1914; Detroit, Michigan, U.S.
- Died: October 2, 1949 (aged 34–35); New York, New York State, U.S.
- Cause of death: Overdose of sleeping pills
- Other names: Mona Manet; Pat Rico
- Education: University of Michigan
- Occupations: Writer, stylist, socialite
- Parent(s): Charles Anthony Roxborough II, Cassandra A. Roxborough

Elsie P. Roxborough (1914 – October 2, 1949) was a mixed-race writer, stylist and Detroit socialite who changed her name to Mona Manet to pass as a white woman. She wrote a gossip column and covered cultural events for the Detroit Guardian. A graduate of the University of Michigan at Ann Arbor, she was the first African American to live in the dormitories there. She produced the Langston Hughes play Drums of Haiti with the Roxane Players in Detroit. She died of a drug overdose in New York City under unclear circumstances.

== Family and education ==
Roxborough was born into a wealthy family in Detroit, Michigan. Her grandfather Charles A. Roxborough II, who had been born a free man in Cleveland, Ohio, in 1856, became prominent in law and politics in New Orleans. In 1899, for the sake of his children, he moved his family out of the South to Detroit, where the family became even more prominent, spawning five generations of lawyers. Charles and other members of the family were described as "mulatto," the slave-era term for biracial. The family were notably light-skinned owing to their white ancestry.

Elsie was born to Charles A. Roxborough III and his biracial wife Cassandra (née Pease). Cassandra died shortly after the birth of Elsie's younger sister Virginia in 1917. Her father became a state senator and owned the weekly newspaper the Detroit Guardian, and the family was powerful, rich and respected among the black community in Detroit.

Elsie remained in Detroit for a year after graduating from Northern High School in Detroit. She wrote a gossip column and about cultural events in the Guardian and made news herself as a socialite. Then 17, she had a romance with boxer Joe Louis, who was managed by her uncle John Roxborough. Nothing came of it, however. Ulysses W. Boykin III, who wrote for the Detroit Tribune, commented in the Detroit Free Press in 1984: "Elise was in love with Joe Louis, it wasn't just rumor... People here felt the romance would blossom into something, but Joe was not cultured."

At the time, Louis was well known in the Detroit black community and starting to earn fame nationally. On July 13, 1935, the Chicago Defender newspaper published a front-page article in which Louis and Elsie both denied they were engaged. "Joe and I are merely friends and my career as a writer is much more important to me than the thought of marriage," Elsie was quoted as saying, while Louis was quoted as saying: "I think Elsie is a fine girl, but... she has her books to think about."

According to Nimrod Carney, an actress who knew Roxborough, the Roxboroughs social standing doomed the relationship. "There was a class thing among blacks," Carney said. "Uncle John would have tried to break it up because John Roxborough was a very proud man. The culture differences would be too great."

Roxborough then continued her education, and in 1934 was the first African American to live in the dormitories of the University of Michigan in Ann Arbor. Roxborough's beauty was striking. Future playwright Arthur Miller, who worked alongside her at The Michigan Daily, called her "a beauty, the most striking girl in Ann Arbor".

She briefly dated Langston Hughes. Roxborough graduated from the University of Michigan in 1937.

== Career and death ==
Roxborough produced Hughes' play Drums of Haiti with her own theater group in Detroit, the Roxane Players. But she soon became frustrated and felt racism was keeping her from the success her talent merit. Using the name Pat Rico, she was the owner of a modeling studio in California, for less than a year. She then moved to New York City to find fame as a writer, but decided to live as a white woman named Mona Manet. She wrote magazine articles, plays and even sold a screenplay to Hollywood.

She died of an overdose of sleeping pills at her Manhattan apartment in 1948. Some have stated that she committed suicide after her father disowned her, while her family and friends debated this. She was described as "ambitious and high-strung yet at times single-minded, lonely and depressed over the challenge of becoming a successful playwright and overcoming racism and sexism."

Roxborough's death was front-page news in Detroit. The Michigan Chronicle's October 8 issue stated: "Energetic people find it hard to sleep at times. Sleeping pills come in handy. But sometimes one can take too many. Elsie took too many. Suicide? No. Elsie was the type of girl who would leave a note for everyone in the Roxborough family if she contemplated suicide. She left no note."

Her death certificate identified her as white.
