= Plaquemine High School =

Location
- 59595 Belleview Drive; Plaquemine, Louisiana 70764; United States; 30.26231°N 91.25097°W

Information
- Type: Public coeducational secondary
- Motto: Pride is a personal commitment
- Established: 1894
- Principal: Donnie Love
- Faculty: 35
- Teaching staff: 90.16 (FTE)
- Grades: 7–12
- Enrollment: 1,028 (2023-2024)
- Student to teacher ratio: 11.40
- Colors: Green, black, and white
- Mascot: Devil
- Nickname: Green Devils
- Website: https://phs.ipsb.net

Plaquemine High School is a public high school located at 59595 Belleview Drive in unincorporated Iberville Parish, Louisiana, United States, south of the City of Plaquemine. It serves grades from seven to twelve and is administered by the Iberville Parish School Board.

As of 2015, it is the sole remaining traditional high school in Iberville Parish.

== History ==
- Plaquemine High School
- U.S. National Register of Historic Places
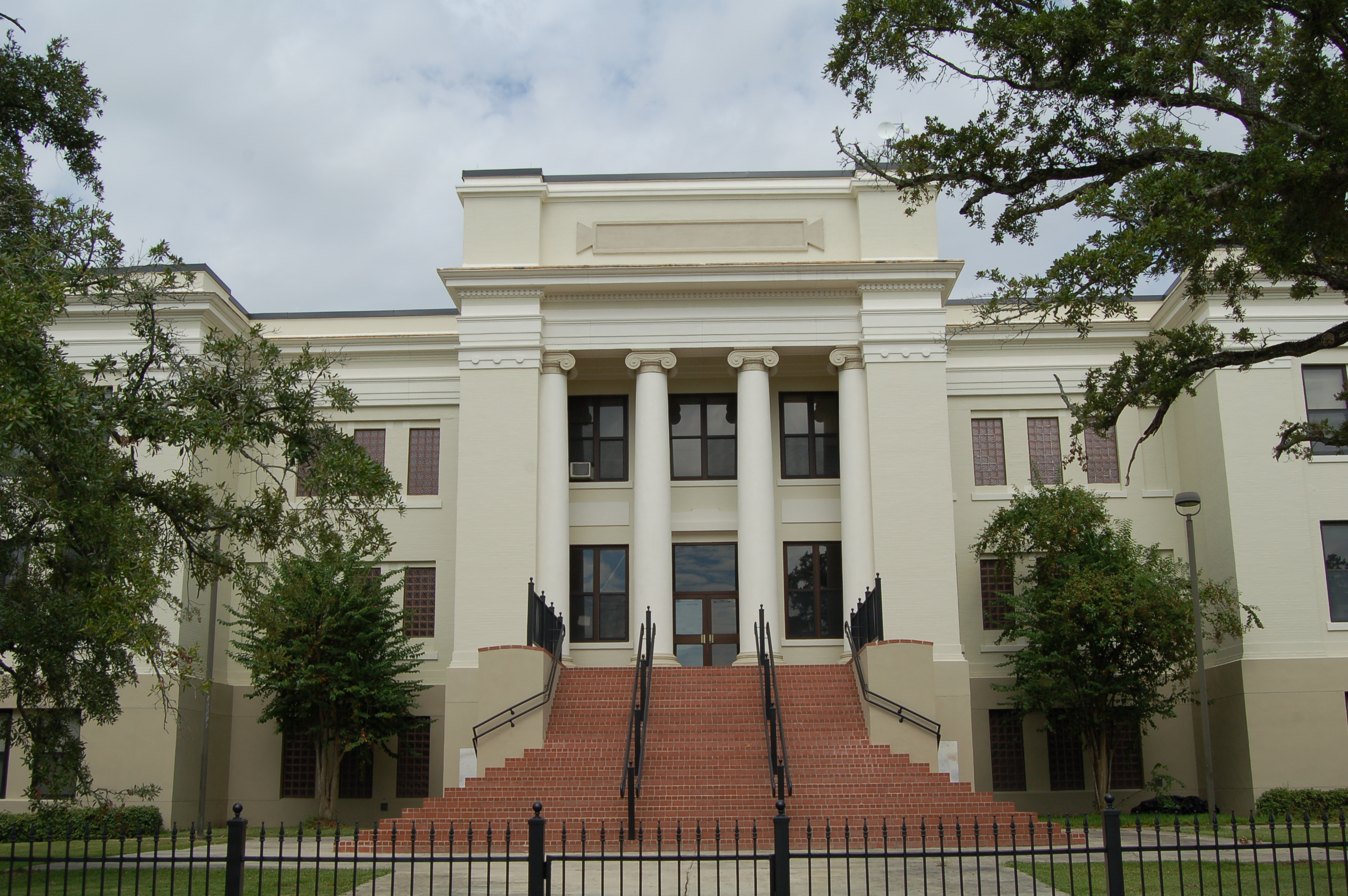
- 1911 Building at 58060 Plaquemine Street

- Location within Louisiana Location within the United States
- Location: 58060 Plaquemine Street, Plaquemine, Louisiana
- Coordinates: 30°17′20″N 91°14′16″W
- Area: 1 acre (0.40 ha)
- Built: 1911
- Built by: Caldwell Brothers
- Architect: Stevens and Nelson Company
- Architectural style: Classical Revival, Beaux Arts
- NRHP reference No.: 92000041
- Added to NRHP: February 13, 1992

Plaquemine High School was originally located at 58060 Plaquemine Street. The building, erected in 1911 in Classical Revival style, hosted the school until a new facility was built in 1931 and is currently housing the Iberville Parish Optional Education Center.

The 1931, building was located at 24130 Ferdinand Street and is currently housing the City of Plaquemine Activity Center (COPAC). In 1974 the school has been located at its current location.

The 1911 building was added to the National Register of Historic Places on February 13, 1992.

After North Iberville High School in Rosedale closed in 2009 students were reassigned to Plaquemine High. Rosedale parents criticized the rezoning to Plaquemine High because of the perceived long distances involved.

== Academics ==
The students at Plaquemine High School are required to take seven classes per day, with an optional vo-tech (which offers shop, drafting and home economics courses) or a college-bound curriculum which includes Calculus, Physics and Spanish as a foreign language.

== Student life ==
The school also has many clubs such as The National Beta Club, Key Club, Student Council, 4-H, ROTC Drill Team, and many other clubs.

== School uniforms ==
The district requires all students to wear school uniforms. Green Polo Shirt and khaki pants or shorts for the 7th & 8th grade. Green Polo Shirt and khaki pants or shorts for the 9th-12th Grade. Seniors are allowed to wear a White Polo Shirt.

== Athletics ==
Plaquemine High Athletics competes in the LHSAA. The school mascot is the Green Devil, which is also the nickname of the sports teams.

The school offers football, basketball, baseball, softball, Dance Team "Dazzlers", cheerleading, track, volleyball, band, and wrestling.

== Notable alumni ==
- Brian Mitchell, former NFL running back and kick returner; Louisiana-Lafayette and PHS quarterback under Coach Don M. Jones.
- Jessel Ourso, sheriff of Iberville Parish, 1964-1968; 1972-1978
- Davon Godchaux, NFL defensive tackle for the Miami Dolphins
- Kevin Dotson, NFL offensive lineman for the Pittsburgh Steelers
- Percy Butler, NFL defensive back for the Washington Commanders
- Dontayvion Wicks, NFL wide receiver for the Philadelphia Eagles

== Faculty ==
- Carolyn Brown, French and English teacher c. 1965–1995; 1995 NFL Teacher of the Year (taught Brian Mitchell 9th-grade English)

== See also ==
- National Register of Historic Places listings in Iberville Parish, Louisiana
