= Roxbury =

Roxbury may refer to:

== Places ==
=== Canada ===
- Roxbury, Nova Scotia, a ghost town
- Roxbury, Prince Edward Island, an unincorporated community

=== United States ===
- Roxbury, Connecticut, a town
- Roxbury, Kansas, an unincorporated community
- Roxbury, Maine, a town
- Roxbury, Boston, a neighborhood of Boston, Massachusetts
- Roxbury, New Hampshire, a town
- Roxbury, New Jersey, a township
- Roxbury, New York, a town in Delaware County, New York
- Roxbury, Queens, part of the Rockaway Peninsula in Queens, New York
- Roxbury, Ohio, an unincorporated community
- Roxbury, Pennsylvania, an unincorporated community
- Roxbury, Vermont, a town
- Roxbury (Oak Grove, Virginia), a historic home near Oak Grove, Westmoreland County, Virginia
- Roxbury, Wisconsin, a town
- Roxbury (community), Wisconsin, an unincorporated community

== See also ==
- Luna Park, Johnstown, former amusement park originally known as "Roxbury Park"
- A Night at the Roxbury, 1998 comedy film
- Roxbury News, independent video news company
- West Roxbury, Massachusetts, a section of Boston
- Roxboro (disambiguation)
- Roxborough (disambiguation)
- Roxburgh (disambiguation)
