= Percy Butler (American football) =

American football player (born 2000)

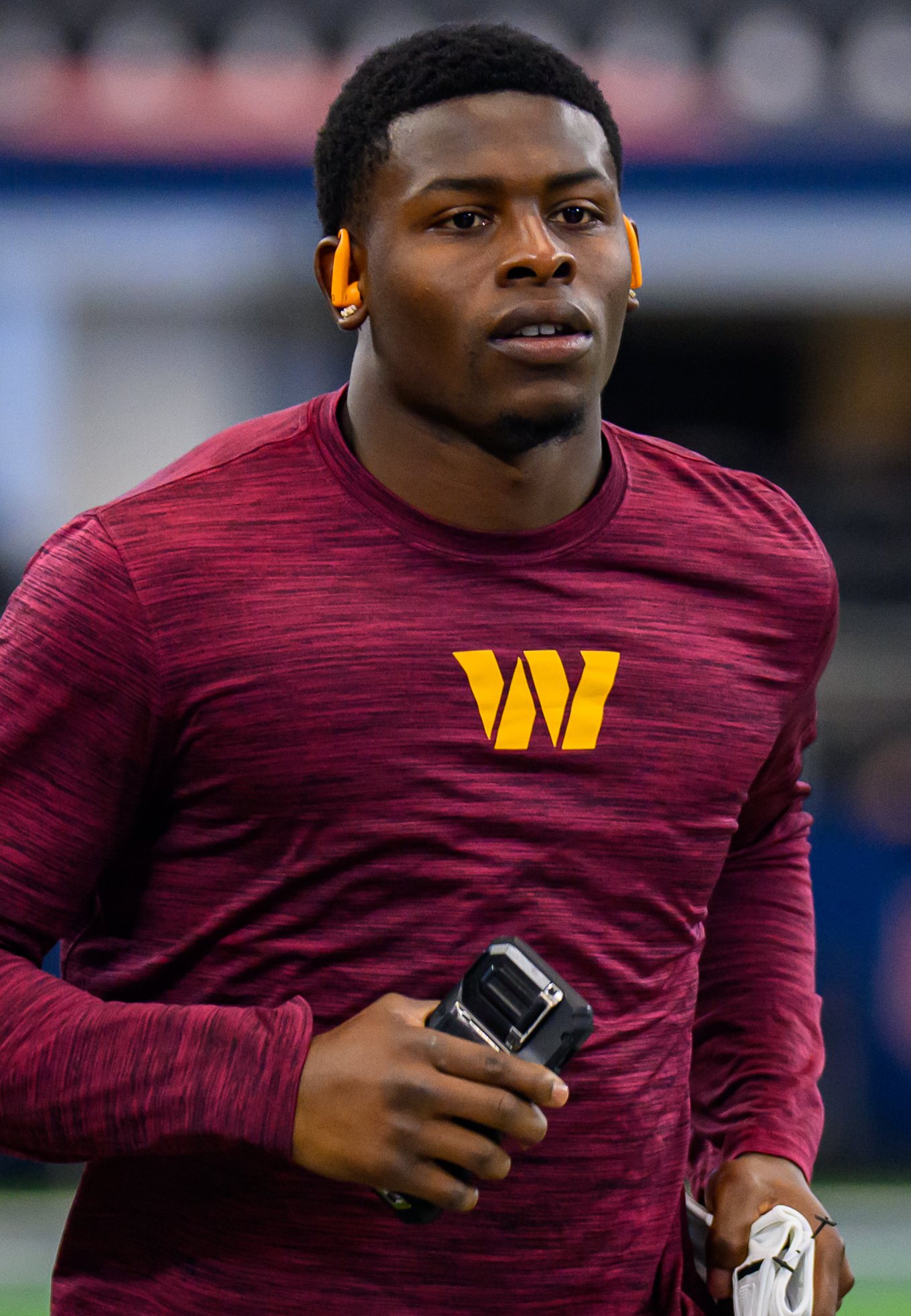
- Butler with the Washington Commanders in 2025

No. 35 – Washington Commanders
- Positions: Safety, Special teamer
- Roster status: Active

Personal information
- Born: May 29, 2000 (age 26); Plaquemine, Louisiana, U.S.
- Listed height: 6 ft 0 in (1.83 m)
- Listed weight: 190 lb (86 kg)

Career information
- High school: Plaquemine
- College: Louisiana (2018–2021)
- NFL draft: 2022: 4th round, 113th overall pick

Career history
- Washington Commanders (2022–present)

Awards and highlights
- Second-team All-Sun Belt (2021)

Career NFL statistics as of 2025
- Tackles: 136
- Forced fumbles: 1
- Fumble recoveries: 1
- Pass deflections: 10
- Stats at Pro Football Reference

Percy Butler III (born May 29, 2000) is an American professional football safety and special teamer for the Washington Commanders of the National Football League (NFL). He played college football for the Louisiana Ragin' Cajuns and was selected by the Commanders in the fourth round of the 2022 NFL draft.

== Early life ==
Butler was born on May 29, 2000 in Plaquemine, Louisiana. He attended and played football at Plaquemine High School, where he played wide receiver and defensive back. As a senior, he was named second-team all-state as a defensive back. He also was a member of Plaquemine’s track team, competing in the triple jump and long jump.

A 2-star recruit, he committed to play college football for Louisiana over offers from Southern Miss and Texas State.

== College career ==
Butler played in six games as a freshman before suffering an injury. He played in all 14 of Louisiana's games with 12 starts in his sophomore season and had 54 tackles with two passes broken up and three forced fumbles.

As a junior, Butler made 44 tackles with two forced fumbles, two fumble recoveries, six passes broken up, and two interceptions. He was given second-team All-Sun Belt honors as a senior after recording 61 tackles, three fumble recoveries, and an interception. He also participated in the 2022 NFL Combine.

== Professional career ==
Pre-draft measurables
Height	Weight	Arm length	Hand span	Wingspan	40-yard dash	10-yard split	20-yard split	20-yard shuttle	Three-cone drill	Vertical jump	Broad jump	Bench press
6 ft 0 1/8 in (1.83 m)	194 lb (88 kg)	31 5/8 in (0.80 m)	9 1/8 in (0.23 m)	6 ft 4 5/8 in (1.95 m)	4.36 s	1.52 s	2.51 s	4.32 s	6.90 s	35.0 in (0.89 m)	10 ft 3 in (3.12 m)	13 reps
All values from NFL Combine/Pro Day

Butler was selected by the Washington Commanders in the fourth round (113th overall) of the 2022 NFL draft. He signed his four-year rookie contract on June 21, 2022. He finished the 2022 season with eleven total tackles, one fumble recovery, and one pass breakup over 15 games.

Starting in Week 6 of the 2023 season, Butler took over as the starting free safety in place for Darrick Forrest, who was placed on injured reserve. On December 30, 2023, the Commanders placed Butler on injured reserve due to a wrist injury. Over 15 games (with 13 starts), he recorded 35 total tackles, eight pass deflections, and one forced fumble.

In the 2024 season, Butler continued to contribute primarily as a special teamer and a backup safety behind starters, Quan Martin and Jeremy Chinn. He played in all 17 regular season games (with five starts) and recorded 47 total tackles and one pass deflection.

Entering the final year of his rookie contract, Butler signed a one-year contract extension on July 25, 2025.
