= Kevin Dotson =

American football player (born 1996)

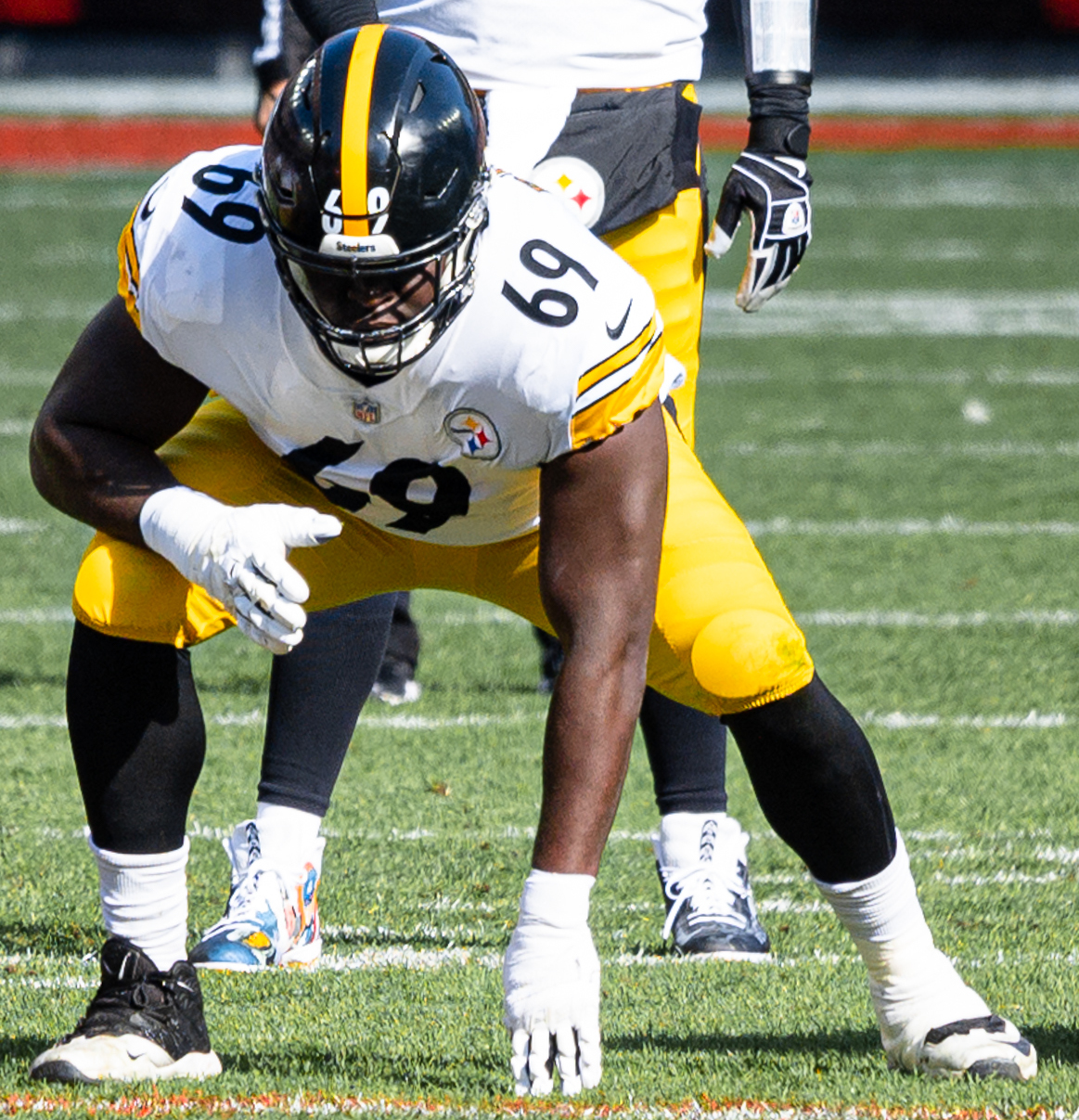
- Dotson with the Pittsburgh Steelers in 2021

No. 69 – Los Angeles Rams
- Position: Guard
- Roster status: Active

Personal information
- Born: September 18, 1996 (age 30); West Point, Mississippi, U.S.
- Listed height: 6 ft 4 in (1.93 m)
- Listed weight: 328 lb (149 kg)

Career information
- High school: Plaquemine (Plaquemine, Louisiana)
- College: Louisiana (2015–2019)
- NFL draft: 2020: 4th round, 135th overall pick

Career history
- Pittsburgh Steelers (2020–2022); Los Angeles Rams (2023–present)

Awards and highlights
- First-team All-American (2019); 2× First-team All-Sun Belt (2018, 2019); Second-team All-Sun Belt (2017)

Career NFL statistics as of Week 1, 2026
- Games played: 85
- Games started: 76
- Stats at Pro Football Reference

Kevin Dotson (born September 18, 1996) is an American professional football guard for the Los Angeles Rams of the National Football League (NFL). He played college football for the Louisiana Ragin' Cajuns.

== Early life ==
Dotson was born in West Point, Mississippi and grew up in Baton Rouge, Louisiana. He attended Plaquemine High School, where he played football with his twin brother Kenny.

== College career ==
Dotson redshirted his true freshman season at the University of Louisiana at Lafayette. He became the Ragin' Cajuns right guard two weeks into his redshirt freshman and was named to the Sun Belt Conference All-Newcomer Team. Dotson was named second-team All-Sun Belt as a redshirt sophomore after starting all 12 of ULL’s games. He was named first-team All-Sun Belt as a redshirt junior after starting 14 games at right guard. Dotson started all 14 of the Ragin' Cajuns games and was again named first-team All-Sun Belt as a redshirt senior and was also named a first-team All-American by the Associated Press and to the second-team by the Sporting News.

== Professional career ==
Pre-draft measurables
Height	Weight	Arm length	Hand span	Wingspan
6 ft 4 in (1.93 m)	310 lb (141 kg)	33 in (0.84 m)	10 1/2 in (0.27 m)	6 ft 9 3/4 in (2.08 m)
All values from Pro Day

=== Pittsburgh Steelers ===
Dotson was selected in the fourth round of the 2020 NFL draft, 135th overall, by the Pittsburgh Steelers. He made his NFL debut on September 14, 2020, in the season opener against the New York Giants, entering the game at right guard to replace injured starter Stefen Wisniewski. Dotson made his first career start the following week on September 20, 2020, against the Denver Broncos. He was placed on the reserve/COVID-19 list by the team on November 14, 2020, and activated on November 30.

Dotson entered the 2021 season as the Steelers starting left guard. He started the first nine games before suffering an ankle injury in Week 10. He was placed on injured reserve on November 20, 2021.

=== Los Angeles Rams ===
On August 27, 2023, the Steelers traded Dotson, along with their 2024 fifth-round draft pick and 2025 sixth-round pick, to the Los Angeles Rams for a 2024 fourth-round pick and a 2025 fifth-round pick. He was named the starting right guard in Week 4, and started the remainder of the season.

On March 7, 2024, Dotson signed a three-year, $48 million contract extension with the Rams.
