= Jim Roxburgh =

Jim Roxburgh may refer to:

- Jim Roxburgh (baseball) (died 1933), American professional baseball player
- Jim Roxburgh (rugby union) (born 1946), Australian rugby union international
