= John Roxborough (boxing manager) =

American bookmaker (1892–1975)

John Walter Roxborough (February 21, 1892 - December 13, 1975) was an American bookmaker, boxing manager and professional sports gambler who, alongside boxing promoter Julian Black, managed the career of Joe Louis. Roxborough and Black were responsible for developing Louis' public image from Louis' rise from amateur status to the end of his heavyweight career in 1949.

== Early life ==
Roxborough was one of four children born to lawyer Charles A. Roxborough II (1856–1908) and Virginia Gertrude Roxborough (1863–1935) in Plaquemine, Louisiana, both of whom were of European and African descent. The family relocated from Louisiana to Detroit, Michigan in 1899. One of his brothers, Charles III, later became the first Black person elected to the Michigan Senate.

== Career ==
Roxborough, in his youth and early adulthood, played basketball, and would assist youth sports programs in predominantly-Black areas of Detroit in the 1920s. He also ran a real estate office in Detroit's Paradise Valley which moonlighted as a front for an illegal numbers ring. Roxborough first came across Joe Louis when Louis was competing in amateur boxing in 1931. As Louis explained in his autobiography, Roxborough convinced the young fighter that white managers would have no real interest in seeing a black boxer work his way up to title contention:

[Roxborough] told me about the fate of most black fighters, ones with white managers, who wound up burned-out and broke before they reached their prime. The white managers were not interested in the men they were handling but in the money they could make from them. They didn't take the proper time to see that their fighters had a proper training, that they lived comfortably, or ate well, or had some pocket change. Mr. Roxborough was talking about Black Power before it became popular.

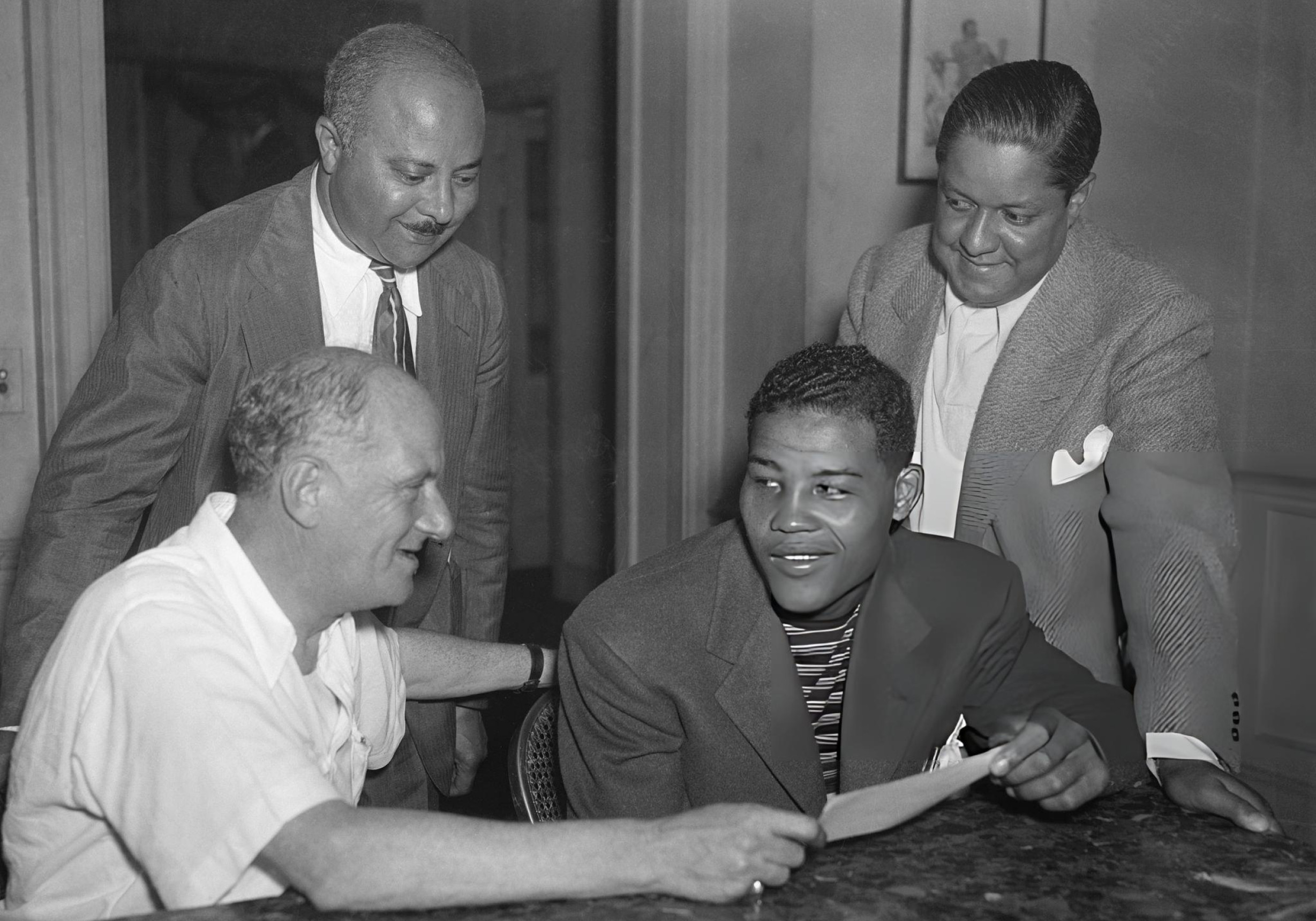
Roxborough (top left) watching Louis paid for his fight against Tony Galento

Roxborough recruited Chicago lawyer and numbers runner Julian Black to help develop Louis' career, and also recruited Jack Blackburn to coach Louis. In 1935, after Louis turned 21, Roxborough and Black convinced Louis to sign a contract which collectively dedicated half of Louis' future income to the pair.

Roxborough and Black were aware of the blowback against Jack Johnson's life and lifestyle, and heavily regulated Louis' behavior in public in order to avoid scrutiny from white audiences.

Roxborough became rich from Louis' career in the ring, but continued to operate a numbers racket. He was eventually convicted and sent to a two-and-a-half year sentence in state prison in 1944. After his release, Roxborough continued as Louis' co-manager until after Louis' last fight with Rocky Marciano in 1951. Roxborough provided Louis with a lifetime position as vice president and director of youth activities at the Superior Life Insurance Society of Michigan.

== Personal life ==
Roxborough married Wilhelmina Morris in 1937 and divorced in 1954 with no children.

Roxborough died in Detroit on December 1, 1975, at the age of 83.
