= John Roxburgh =

John Roxburgh may refer to:

- J. F. Roxburgh (John Fergusson Roxburgh; 1888–1954), British schoolmaster and author
- Jack Roxburgh (John Maxwell Roxburgh; 1901–1975), Canadian ice hockey administrator and politician
- John Roxburgh (footballer) (1901–1965), British footballer
- John Roxburgh (minister) (1806–1880), Moderator of the General Assembly of the Free Church of Scotland
- John Roxburgh (racing driver) (1932–1993), Australian racing driver
- John Roxburgh (Royal Navy officer) (1919–2004), British admiral
