= Plaquemine, Louisiana =

- City
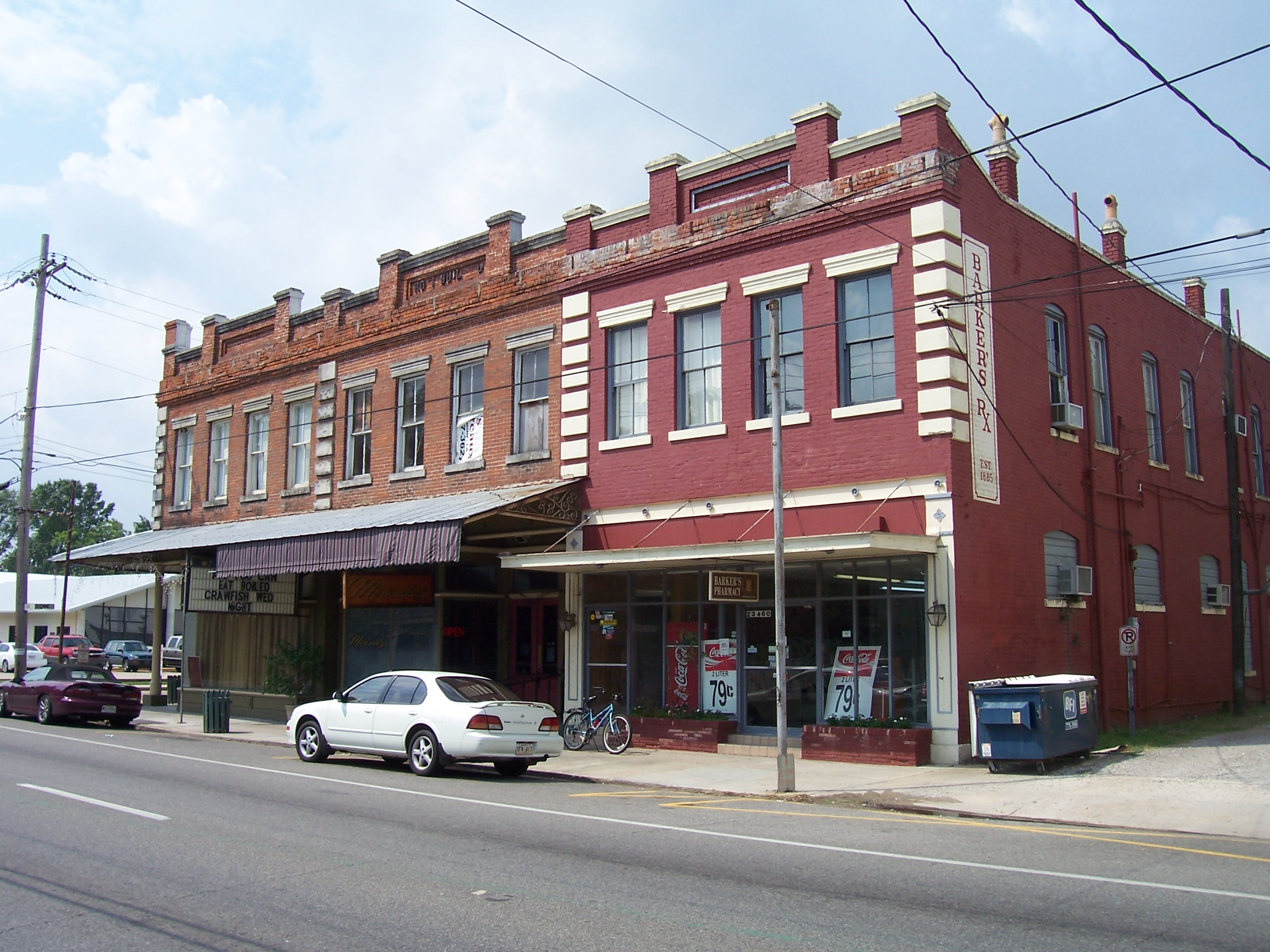
- Old Square
- Nickname: "City of Hospitality"
- Location of Plaquemine in Iberville Parish, Louisiana

- Location of Louisiana in the United States
- Coordinates: 30°16′53″N 91°14′56″W
- Country: United States
- State: Louisiana
- Parish: Iberville
- Settled: 1775
- Incorporated: 1838

Government
  - Mayor: John "JB" Barker (I)

Area
  - Total: 3.00 sq mi (7.78 km^{2})
  - Land: 2.92 sq mi (7.57 km^{2})
  - Water: 0.081 sq mi (0.21 km^{2})
- Elevation: 20 ft (6.1 m)

Population (2020)
  - Total: 6,269
  - Density: 2,144.7/sq mi (828.08/km^{2})
- Time zone: UTC-6 (CST)
  - Summer (DST): UTC-5 (CDT)
- ZIP code: 70764
- Area code: 225
- FIPS code: 22-60880
- GNIS feature ID: 2404537
- Website: www.plaquemine.org

Plaquemine is a city in and the parish seat of Iberville Parish, Louisiana, United States. It is part of the Baton Rouge metropolitan statistical area. At the 2010 United States census, the population was 7,119; the 2020 census determined its population was 6,269.

== History ==
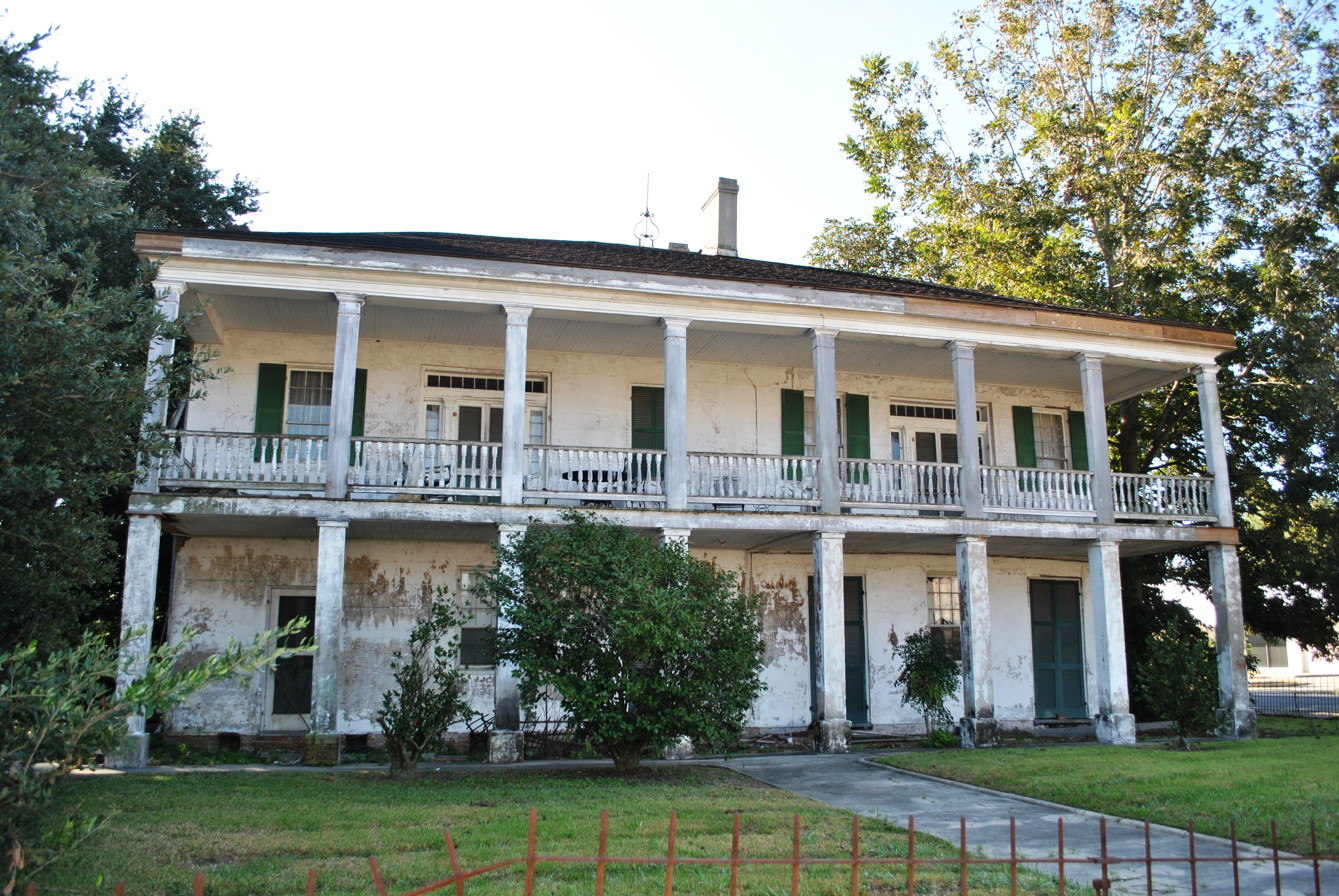
Abandoned house in Plaquemine

Early inhabitants of the area were the Chitimacha people. Pierre Le Moyne d'Iberville claimed all of Louisiana in 1699 for King Louis XIV of France. Plaquemine was settled by 1775, and its name comes from the French word plaquemine meaning persimmon.

Due to its location at the juncture of Bayou Plaquemine and the Mississippi River, the village soon began to prosper and grow, beginning a long history of prosperity. By 1838, the town was incorporated, electing Zénon Labauve, for whom a street in New Orleans' Garden District is named, as its first mayor.

Plaquemine continued to grow in the Antebellum era. Massive plantations were established in nearby regions, including St. Louis, Nottoway, and Belle Grove. The town has been the seat of Iberville Parish government since its incorporation. The second parish courthouse (c. 1906) on Railroad Avenue has been serving as City Hall since 1985. Plaquemine did not have a hospital until 1923.

Plaquemine has been a Louisiana-designated Main Street City since 1993. There are ten properties listed for Plaquemine on the National Register of Historic Places in Iberville Parish, Louisiana.

== Geography ==
Plaquemine is located at the junction of Bayou Plaquemine and the Mississippi River. The city itself is surrounded by farmland; beyond the farmland to the west lies nearly uninhabited swampland.

According to the United States Census Bureau, the city has a total area of 3.0 square miles (7.8 km^{2}), of which 2.9 square miles (7.6 km^{2}) are land and 0.1 square miles (0.2 km^{2}), or 2.75%, are water. It lies within the Baton Rouge metropolitan area.

== Demographics ==
Historical population
Census	Pop.	Note	%±
1860	1,663		—
1870	1,460		−12.2%
1880	2,061		41.2%
1890	3,222		56.3%
1900	3,590		11.4%
1910	4,955		38.0%
1920	4,632		−6.5%
1930	5,124		10.6%
1940	5,049		−1.5%
1950	5,747		13.8%
1960	7,689		33.8%
1970	7,739		0.7%
1980	7,521		−2.8%
1990	7,186		−4.5%
2000	7,064		−1.7%
2010	7,119		0.8%
2020	6,269		−11.9%
2025 (est.)	5,891	▼	−6.0%
U.S. Decennial Census

Plaquemine, Louisiana – Racial and ethnic composition Note: the US Census treats Hispanic/Latino as an ethnic category. This table excludes Latinos from the racial categories and assigns them to a separate category. Hispanics/Latinos may be of any race.
Race / Ethnicity (NH = Non-Hispanic)	Pop 2000	Pop 2010	Pop 2020	% 2000	% 2010	% 2020
White alone (NH)	3,443	3,249	2,874	48.74%	45.64%	45.84%
Black or African American alone (NH)	3,471	3,615	2,952	49.14%	50.78%	47.09%
Native American or Alaska Native alone (NH)	12	13	14	0.17%	0.18%	0.22%
Asian alone (NH)	19	26	33	0.27%	0.37%	0.53%
Pacific Islander alone (NH)	2	1	5	0.03%	0.01%	0.08%
Some Other Race alone (NH)	0	0	12	0.00%	0.00%	0.19%
Mixed race or Multiracial (NH)	36	44	170	0.51%	0.62%	2.71%
Hispanic or Latino (any race)	81	171	209	1.15%	2.40%	3.33%
Total	7,064	7,119	6,269	100.00%	100.00%	100.00%

The 2020 census determined 6,269 people lived in the city. At the 2000 United States census, there were 7,064 people, 2,593 households, and 1,846 families residing in the city.

At the 2019 American Community Survey, the racial and ethnic makeup was 54.9% Black and African American, 38.6% non-Hispanic white, 0.1% two or more races, and 6.4% Hispanic and Latin American of any race. In 2000, the racial and ethnic makeup of the city was 49.26% White, 49.60% African American, 0.17% American Indian and Alaska Native, 0.27% Asian, 0.03% Pacific Islander, 0.08% from other races, and 0.58% from two or more races. Hispanic and Latin Americans of any race were 1.15% of the population.

In 2000, there were 2,593 households, out of which 29.7% had children under the age of 18 living with them, 44.0% were married couples living together, 22.7% had a female householder with no husband present, and 28.8% were non-families. 26.5% of all households were made up of individuals, and 10.5% had someone living alone who was 65 years of age or older. The average household size was 2.64 and the average family size was 3.21. In 2019, there were 2,578 households and an average of 2.54 people per household.

From 2015 to 2019, the median household income was $44,457, and the per capita income was $24,871. Males had a median income of $61,418 versus $27,875 for females. Approximately 27.0% of the population lived at or below the poverty line. In 2000, the median income for a household in the city was $28,364, and the median income for a family was $32,971. Males had a median income of $34,868 versus $21,016 for females. The per capita income for the city was $14,066. About 23.6% of families and 24.4% of the population were below the poverty line, including 35.8% of those under age 18 and 17.5% of those age 65 or over.

== Culture ==
=== Annual cultural events ===
Plaquemine's annual International Acadian Festival draws visitors from all over the world. Local Mardi Gras celebrations also attract tourists.

=== Tourism ===
Plaquemine is noted for a number of antebellum structures that survive within the city limits and along Bayou Road. One of the most noteworthy homes is St. Basil's, a riverfront mansion built by socialite physician Dr. John Scratchley in the 1850s. Now a private residence, the home retains the name St. Basil's from when it was a fashionable convent school.

The Iberville Museum was built in 1949 as the Iberville Parish Courthouse. The building served as Plaquemine's first city hall, and was the city seat of government until 1985. It now serves as a parish museum, and the building is on the National Register of Historic Places.

The Plaquemine Lock, constructed from 1895 to 1909, was an important link between the Mississippi River and the Intracoastal Canal, of which Bayou Plaquemine served as its northern terminus. Its design served as the prototype for the Panama Canal locks; the Plaquemine Lock was shut down in 1961. In 1974, the U.S. Army Corps of Engineers supervised the construction of the levee that runs across the mouth of Bayou Plaquemine at the Mississippi River. The Plaquemine Lock was placed on the National Register of Historic Places in 1972. The area now operates as a state park.

== Education ==
Iberville Parish School Board operates public schools.

Plaquemine High School is outside the city limits, in an unincorporated area. Mathematics, Science, and Arts Academy - West is outside the city limits, in an unincorporated area.

== Infrastructure ==
=== Transportation ===
Plaquemine is accessed by four highways: LA 3066, LA 75, LA 77, and the scenic LA 1. Other highways include LA 992 (Tenant Road) and LA 405. LA 3066 continues from Court Street to "Down the Bayou" neighborhoods. LA 75 accesses east over the Mississippi River via toll ferry to Saint Gabriel and leads southwest from Plaquemine, eventually reaching Bayou Pigeon. LA 77 starts around the Island Country Club and continues northwest to Maringouin. LA 1 runs north to Interstate 10/Baton Rouge and south to Donaldsonville. Plaquemine lacks public transportation and its residents rely completely on the use of the automobile.

=== National Guard ===
Plaquemine is the home of the 256th Brigade Special Troops Battalion, formerly known as the 1088th Engineer Battalion, a unit made up of combat engineer, military intelligence, signal, military police and other supporting units. The 256th BSTB is part of the 256th Infantry Brigade of the Louisiana Army National Guard that served in Iraq from 2004 to 2005.

== Notable people ==
- Chad M. Brown, member of the Louisiana House of Representatives for Iberville and Assumption parishes
- Percy Butler, NFL defensive back for the Washington Commanders
- Kevin Dotson, NFL offensive lineman for the Pittsburgh Steelers
- Robert "Bobby" Freeman (1934–2016), lieutenant governor of Louisiana from 1980 to 1988
- Davon Godchaux, American football player
- Lee Meitzen Grue, poet and educator
- Bill Lee, former Major League Baseball pitcher
- Brian Mitchell, former Washington Redskins football player
- Clarence Williams, early jazz pianist and composer
- Dontayvion Wicks, NFL wide receiver for the Philadelphia Eagles
