= 2018 Appalachian State Mountaineers football team =

American college football season

2018 Appalachian State Mountaineers football

Sun Belt champion Sun Belt East Division co-champion New Orleans Bowl champion

Sun Belt Championship Game, W 30–19 vs. Louisiana

New Orleans Bowl, W 45–13 vs. Middle Tennessee
- Conference: Sun Belt Conference
- East Division
- Record: 11–2 (7–1 Sun Belt)
- Head coach: Scott Satterfield (6th season; regular season); Mark Ivey (interim; bowl game)
- Co-offensive coordinators: Frank Ponce (6th season); Shawn Clark (3rd season)
- Offensive scheme: Spread option
- Defensive coordinator: Bryan Brown (1st season)
- Base defense: 4–2–5
- Home stadium: Kidd Brewer Stadium

2018 Sun Belt Conference football standings
	Conf.			Overall
Team	W		L	W		L
East Division
Appalachian State xy$	7	–	1	11	–	2
Troy x	7	–	1	10	–	3
Georgia Southern	6	–	2	10	–	3
Coastal Carolina	2	–	6	5	–	7
Georgia State	1	–	7	2	–	10
West Division
Louisiana xy	5	–	3	7	–	7
Arkansas State x	5	–	3	8	–	5
Louisiana–Monroe	4	–	4	6	–	6
South Alabama	2	–	6	3	–	9
Texas State	1	–	7	3	–	9
Championship: Appalachian State 30, Louisiana 19
$ – Conference champion; x – Division champion/co-champions; y – Championship game participant

The 2018 Appalachian State Mountaineers football team represented Appalachian State University during the 2018 NCAA Division I FBS football season. The Mountaineers were led by sixth-year head coach Scott Satterfield and played their home games at Kidd Brewer Stadium. They competed as a member of the East Division of the Sun Belt Conference. They finished the season 11–2, 7–1 in Sun Belt play to be co-champions of the East Division with Troy. Due to their head-to-head win over Troy, they represented the East Division in the inaugural Sun Belt Championship Game where they defeated West Division champion Louisiana to become Sun Belt Champions for the third consecutive year and first time outright. They were invited to the New Orleans Bowl where they defeated Middle Tennessee.

On December 3, head coach Scott Satterfield resigned to become the head coach at Louisville. He finished at Appalachian State with a six year record of 51–24. Defensive line coach Mark Ivey led the Mountaineers in the New Orleans Bowl.

On December 13, Appalachian State hired North Carolina State offensive coordinator Eliah Drinkwitz as their new head coach.

== Preseason ==
=== Award watch lists ===
Listed in the order that they were released

Award	Player	Position	Year
Maxwell Award	Jalin Moore	RB	SR
Doak Walker Award	Jalin Moore	RB	SR
John Mackey Award	Collin Reed	TE	JR
Jim Thorpe Award	Clifton Duck	DB	JR
Bronko Nagurski Trophy	Tae Hayes	CB	SR
Wuerffel Trophy	MyQuon Stout	DL	SR

=== Sun Belt coaches poll ===
On July 19, 2018, the Sun Belt released their preseason coaches poll with the Mountaineers predicted to finish as champions of the East Division.

=== Preseason All-Sun Belt Teams ===
The Mountaineers had seven players selected to the preseason all-Sun Belt teams. Defensive back Clifton Duck was selected as the preseason defensive player of the year.

Offense

1st team

Jalin Moore – RB

Collin Reed – TE

Victor Johnson – OL

Defense

1st team

Anthony Flory – LB

Clifton Duck – DB

2nd team

Myquon Stout – DL

Tae Hayes – DB

== Recruiting ==
The Mountaineers signed 24 recruits.

College recruiting information (2018)
Name	Hometown	School	Height	Weight	Commit date
Kaleb Dawson; S	Moultrie, Georgia	Colquitt County	6 ft 0 in (1.83 m)	175 lb (79 kg)	May 28, 2017
Kaleb Dawson; S	Recruit ratings: Rivals: 247Sports:				
Zareon Hayes; OLB	Dillon, South Carolina	Dillon	6 ft 2 in (1.88 m)	225 lb (102 kg)	Jun 11, 2017
Zareon Hayes; OLB	Recruit ratings: Rivals: 247Sports:				
Richard Tucker; WR	Inman, South Carolina	Chapman	6 ft 0 in (1.83 m)	181 lb (82 kg)	Jun 14, 2017
Richard Tucker; WR	Recruit ratings: Rivals: 247Sports:				
Tyler Bird; OLB	Dallas, Georgia	North Paulding	6 ft 1 in (1.85 m)	218 lb (99 kg)	Jun 19, 2017
Tyler Bird; OLB	Recruit ratings: Rivals: 247Sports:				
Michael Price; CB	Stockbridge, Georgia	Stockbridge	5 ft 10 in (1.78 m)	180 lb (82 kg)	Jun 22, 2017
Michael Price; CB	Recruit ratings: Rivals: 247Sports:				
Logan Doublin; OLB	Largo, Florida	Largo	6 ft 0 in (1.83 m)	190 lb (86 kg)	Jun 24, 2017
Logan Doublin; OLB	Recruit ratings: Rivals: 247Sports:				
Trey Ross; TE	Randleman, North Carolina	Randleman	6 ft 3 in (1.91 m)	227 lb (103 kg)	Jul 10, 2017
Trey Ross; TE	Recruit ratings: Rivals: 247Sports:				
Christopher Washington; ILB	Newberry, Florida	Newberry	6 ft 0 in (1.83 m)	265 lb (120 kg)	Jul 28, 2017
Christopher Washington; ILB	Recruit ratings: Rivals: 247Sports:				
Brock Mattison; OLB	Buford, Georgia	Buford	6 ft 2 in (1.88 m)	225 lb (102 kg)	Sep 25, 2017
Brock Mattison; OLB	Recruit ratings: Rivals: 247Sports:				
Hansky Paillant; DE	Hollywood, Florida	Miramar	6 ft 3 in (1.91 m)	230 lb (100 kg)	Sep 25, 2017
Hansky Paillant; DE	Recruit ratings: Rivals: 247Sports:				
Trey Cobb; DE	Waycross, Georgia	Ware County	6 ft 2 in (1.88 m)	210 lb (95 kg)	Sep 25, 2017
Trey Cobb; DE	Recruit ratings: Rivals: 247Sports:				
Nick Hampton; DE	Anderson, South Carolina	Westside	6 ft 3 in (1.91 m)	210 lb (95 kg)	Sep 25, 2017
Nick Hampton; DE	Recruit ratings: Rivals: 247Sports:				
Luke Burnette; TE	Monroe, North Carolina	Sun Valley	6 ft 5 in (1.96 m)	241 lb (109 kg)	Sep 25, 2017
Luke Burnette; TE	Recruit ratings: Rivals: 247Sports:				
Stephon Brown; QB	Kernersville, North Carolina	R. B. Glenn	6 ft 5 in (1.96 m)	218 lb (99 kg)	Sep 25, 2017
Stephon Brown; QB	Recruit ratings: Rivals: 247Sports: ESPN:				
Jordon Earle; OG	West Palm Beach, Florida	Forest Hill Community	6 ft 0 in (1.83 m)	292 lb (132 kg)	Sep 25, 2017
Jordon Earle; OG	Recruit ratings: Rivals: 247Sports:				
Cooper Hodges; OT	Glen St. Mary, Florida	Baker County Senior	6 ft 3 in (1.91 m)	280 lb (130 kg)	Sep 25, 2017
Cooper Hodges; OT	Recruit ratings: Rivals: 247Sports:				
Braden Collins; WR	Knoxville, Tennessee	Farragut	6 ft 2 in (1.88 m)	196 lb (89 kg)	Sep 25, 2017
Braden Collins; WR	Recruit ratings: Rivals: 247Sports:				
Jay Person; ILB	Cleveland, Tennessee	Bradley Central	6 ft 4 in (1.93 m)	200 lb (91 kg)	Oct 11, 2017
Jay Person; ILB	Recruit ratings: Rivals: 247Sports:				
A. J. Beach; CB	Milledgeville, Georgia	Georgia Military College	5 ft 10 in (1.78 m)	165 lb (75 kg)	Oct 30, 2017
A. J. Beach; CB	Recruit ratings: Rivals: 247Sports:				
Henry Pearson; TE	Paramus, New Jersey	Paramus Catholic	6 ft 3 in (1.91 m)	225 lb (102 kg)	Dec 15, 2017
Henry Pearson; TE	Recruit ratings: Rivals: 247Sports:				
Anderson Hardy; OT	Raleigh, North Carolina	Jesse O. Sanderson	6 ft 6 in (1.98 m)	260 lb (120 kg)	Dec 20, 2017
Anderson Hardy; OT	Recruit ratings: Rivals: 247Sports:				
Harrison Taylor; OLB	McDonough, Georgia	Eagle's Landing Christian Academy	6 ft 4 in (1.93 m)	237 lb (108 kg)	Dec 20, 2017
Harrison Taylor; OLB	Recruit ratings: Rivals: 247Sports:				
Camerun Peoples; RB	Lineville, Alabama	Clay Central	6 ft 1 in (1.85 m)	193 lb (88 kg)	Dec 20, 2017
Camerun Peoples; RB	Recruit ratings: Rivals: 247Sports:				
Josh Headlee; OT	Boone, North Carolina	Watauga	6 ft 4 in (1.93 m)	270 lb (120 kg)	Dec 20, 2017
Josh Headlee; OT	Recruit ratings: Rivals: 247Sports:				
Overall recruit ranking: 247Sports: 111
Note: In many cases, Scout, Rivals, 247Sports, On3, and ESPN may conflict in their listings of height and weight.; In these cases, the average was taken. ESPN grades are on a 100-point scale.; Sources: "Appalachian StateFootball commits". Rivals.; "ESPN". ESPN.; "2018 Team Ranking". Rivals.com.

== Roster ==
2018 Appalachian State Mountaineers football team roster
Players
Coaches
Offense

Pos.	#	Name	Class
QB	2	Zeb Speir	Sr
WR	2	Corey Sutton	So
RB, WR	3	Darrynton Evans	So
WR	4	Dominique Heath	Sr
WR	5	Thomas Hennigan	So
RB	6	Camerun Peoples	Fr
QB	7	Jacob Huesman	So
QB	8	Stephon Brown	Fr
QB	9	Jackson Gibbs	Fr
QB	10	Tanner Wilson	Fr
WR	11	Jalen Virgil	So
QB	12	Zac Thomas	So
QB	13	Peyton Derrick	Fr
WR	14	Malik Williams	So
WR	15	Mock Adams	Jr
WR	17	Trevion McCollum	So
WR	18	Brad Absher	Sr
RB	19	Daetrich Harrington	So
WR	20	A'Darius Purifoy	So
WR	21	Dysaun Razzak	Fr
RB	22	D'Andre Hicks	Fr
RB	25	Jalin Moore	Sr
RB	26	Marcus Williams, Jr.	So
RB	27	DeMarcus Harper	So
RB	34	Nakendrick Clark	Jr
TE	35	Miller Gibbs	Fr
OL	51	Baer Hunter	So
OL	52	Tobias Edge−Campbell	Sr
OL	55	Matt Williams	So
OL	56	Nate Haskins	So
OL	58	Ryan Neuzil	So
OL	60	Noah Hannon	So
OL	62	Weston Gillespie	So
OL	63	Ivan Reyes	So
OL	64	Will Hardin	So
OL	65	Gage Blackston	Fr
OL	67	Logan Wright	So
OL	70	Cooper Hodges	Fr
OL	73	Cole Garrison	So
OL	74	Anderson Hardy	Fr
OL	75	Victor Johnson	Jr
OL	77	Josh Headlee	Fr
OL	78	Chandler Greer	Sr
OL	79	Luke Burnette	Fr
WR	80	A. J. Hall	Fr
WR	81	Braden Collins	Fr
WR	82	Richard Tucker	Fr
WR	83	Jake Henry	Fr
TE	84	Mike Evans	Jr
TE	84	Joe Hartung	Fr
WR	85	Michael Queen	So
TE	80	Trey Ross	Fr
TE	87	Collin Reed	Jr
TE	88	Henry Pearson	Fr
TE	89	Devin Papenheim	Fr

Defense

Pos.	#	Name	Class
DB	4	Clifton Duck	Jr
DB	6	Desmond Franklin	Jr
DB	7	Josh Thomas	Jr
DB	8	Shemar Jean-Charles	So
DB	9	Austin Exford	Sr
LB	10	Tim Frizzell	So
DB	11	Jeremy Level	So
DB	12	Steven Jones Jr.	Fr
DB	13	Kaiden Smith	So
DB	16	Shaun Jolly	Fr
DB	17	Tae Hayes	Sr
DB	19	Mike Price	Fr
LB	20	Noel Cook	Jr
DB	21	Ryan Huff	Fr
LB	22	Jace Frisbee	Fr
LB	24	Akeem Davis-Gaither	Jr
DB	25	Kaleb Dawson	Fr
LB	26	Matthew McQuinn	Fr
DB	27	A. J. Beach	Jr
LB	28	Jay Person	Fr
LB	29	Devonte Harrison	So
LB	30	Zareon Hayes	Fr
LB	31	Nick Hampton	Fr
LB	33	Jordan Mitchell	Fr
DL	36	Brock Mattison	Fr
DB	39	Zion Madden	Fr
LB	40	Logan Doublin	Fr
DL	42	Harrison Taylor	Fr
DL	43	Hansky Paillant	Fr
LB	44	Anthony Flory	Sr
LB	45	Trey Cobb	Fr
DL	46	Chris Washington	Fr
DL	47	Okon Godwin	Sr
DL	48	Demetrius Taylor	So
LB	49	Blythe Hall	So
LB	50	Keaton Forbes	Fr
LB	51	Tyler Bird	Fr
LB	52	D'Marco Jackson	Fr
DL	54	Jermaine McDaniel Jr.	Fr
DL	57	Elijah Diarrassouba	So
LB	59	Jordan Fehr	Jr
DL	66	Will Israel	Fr
DL	68	Brody Barrett	Jr
DL	88	Cameron Pack	So
DL	89	Dorian Pickett	Fr
DL	90	Chris Willis	So
DL	91	Tommy Dawkins	So
DL	92	MyQuon Stout	Sr
DL	94	Josh Houser	Jr
DL	95	George Blackstock	Fr
DL	96	Markell Clark	So
DL	97	Caleb Spurlin	So
DL	98	E. J. Scott	Jr
DL	99	Jordon Earle	Fr

Special teams

Pos.	#	Name	Class
K	29	John Gliarmis	Fr
P	30	Clayton Howell	Fr
P	39	Xavier Subotsch	So
K	41	Michael Rubino	Jr
LS	53	Max Durshlag	Fr
K	91	Chandler Staton	So
LS	93	Elias McMurry	Sr

Head coach

- Scott Satterfield

Coordinators/assistant coaches

- Bryan Brown (defensive coordinator / cornerbacks)
- Shawn Clark (co-offensive coordinator / offensive line)
- Dale Jones (co-defensive coordinator / inside linebackers)
- Frank Ponce (co-offensive coordinator / quarterbacks)
- Mark Ivey (assistant head coach / defensive line)
- Nic Cardwell (tight ends)
- Greg Gasparato (safeties)
- Stu Holt (running backs / special teams)
- D. J. Smith (outside linebackers)
- Justin Watts (wide receivers / recruiting coordinator)

Legend

- (C) Team captain
- (S) Suspended
- (I) Ineligible
- Injured
- Redshirt

Roster
Last update: September 17, 2018

== Schedule ==
Date	Time	Opponent	Rank	Site	TV	Result	Attendance
September 1	3:30 p.m.	at No. 10 Penn State*		Beaver Stadium; University Park, PA	BTN	L 38–45 ^{OT}	105,232
September 8	6:00 p.m.	at Charlotte*		Jerry Richardson Stadium; Charlotte, NC	ESPN+	W 45–9	19,151
~~September 15~~	~~3:30 p.m.~~	~~Southern Miss~~*		~~Kidd Brewer Stadium~~; ~~Boone, NC~~	~~ESPN+~~	Canceled (Note: This game was canceled because of Hurricane Florence.)	
September 22	3:30 p.m.	Gardner–Webb*		Kidd Brewer Stadium; Boone, NC	ESPN+	W 72–7	21,084
September 29	3:30 p.m.	South Alabama^{†}		Kidd Brewer Stadium; Boone, NC	ESPN+	W 52–7	25,862
October 9	8:00 p.m.	at Arkansas State		Centennial Bank Stadium; Jonesboro, AR	ESPN2	W 35–9	21,421
October 20	3:30 p.m.	Louisiana		Kidd Brewer Stadium; Boone, NC	ESPN+	W 27–17	27,082
October 25	7:30 p.m.	at Georgia Southern	No. 25	Paulson Stadium; Statesboro, GA (rivalry)	ESPNU	L 14–34	19,252
November 3	5:00 p.m.	at Coastal Carolina		Brooks Stadium; Conway, SC	ESPN+	W 23–7	13,004
November 10	4:00 p.m.	at Texas State		Bobcat Stadium; San Marcos, TX	ESPN3	W 38–7	11,482
November 17	2:30 p.m.	Georgia State		Kidd Brewer Stadium; Boone, NC	ESPN+	W 45–17	22,315
November 24	2:30 p.m.	Troy		Kidd Brewer Stadium; Boone, NC	ESPN+	W 21–10	20,410
December 1	Noon	Louisiana		Kidd Brewer Stadium; Boone, NC (Sun Belt Championship Game)	ESPN	W 30–19	14,963
December 15	9:00 p.m.	vs. Middle Tennessee*		Mercedes-Benz Superdome; New Orleans, LA (New Orleans Bowl)	ESPN	W 45–13	23,942
*Non-conference game; ^{†}Homecoming; Rankings from AP Poll released prior to the game; All times are in Eastern time

== Game summaries ==
=== At Penn State ===
Appalachian State at Penn State – Game summary

Quarter	1	2	3	4	OT	Total
Appalachian State	10	0	0	28	0	38
No. 10 Penn State	7	3	14	14	7	45

at Beaver Stadium, University Park, Pennsylvania

- Date: September 1
- Game time: 3:30 p.m. EDT
- Game weather: 76 °F (24 °C); cloudy, humid
- Game attendance: 105,232
- Referee: Mark Kluczynski
- TV announcers (Big Ten Network): Kevin Kugler, Matt Millen, Lisa Byington
- ESPN Box Score GoPSUsports.com Box Score

Game information

First quarter

- PSU – Trace McSorley, 12-yard TD run, Jake Pinegar kick good, 12:02 (PSU 7–0)
- APP – Darrynton Evans, 100-yard kickoff return, Chandler Staton kick good, 11:48 (TIE 7–7)
- APP – Staton, 38-yard field goal, 4:10 (ASU 10–7)

Second quarter

- PSU – Pinegar, 32-yard field goal, 0:12 (TIE 10–10)

Third quarter

- PSU – McSorley, 10-yard TD run, Pinegar kick good, 9:41 (PSU 17–10)
- PSU – Ricky Slade, 27-yard TD run, Pinegar kick good, 2:41 (PSU 24–10)

Fourth quarter

- APP – Malik Williams, 17-yard TD pass from Zac Thomas, Staton kick good, 13:39 (PSU 24–17)
- PSU – Miles Sanders, 2-yard TD run, Pinegar kick good, 11:17 (PSU 31–17)
- APP – Williams, 24-yard TD pass from Thomas, Staton kick good, 7:40 (PSU 31–24)
- APP – Thomas, 1-yard TD run, Staton kick good, 6:03 (TIE 31–31)
- APP – Jalin Moore, 16-yard TD run, Staton kick good, 1:47 (APP 38–31)
- PSU – K. J. Hamler, 15-yard TD pass from McSorley, Pinegar kick good, 0:42 (TIE 38–38)

Overtime

- PSU – Sanders, 4-yard TD run, Pinegar kick good, (PSU 45–38)

Top passers

- APP – Zac Thomas – 25/38, 270 yards, 2 TD, INT
- PSU – Trace McSorley – 20/35, 229 yards, TD

Top rushers

- APP – Jalin Moore – 18 carries, 88 yards, TD
- PSU – Miles Sanders – 19 carries, 91 yards, 2 TD

Top receivers

- APP – Corey Sutton – 6 receptions, 87 yards
- APP – Malik Williams – 4 receptions, 66 yards, 2 TD
- PSU – K. J. Hamler – 3 receptions, 67 yards, TD
- PSU – Juwan Johnson – 6 receptions, 67 yards

Top defenders

- APP – Anthony Flory – 10 tackles
- PSU – Jan Johnson – 11 tackles

=== At Charlotte ===
Appalachian State at Charlotte – Game summary

Quarter	1	2	3	4	Total
App State	10	14	7	14	45
Charlotte	0	9	0	0	9

at Jerry Richardson Stadium, Charlotte, North Carolina

- Date: September 8
- Game time: 6:04 p.m. EDT
- Game weather: 90 °F (32 °C); Partly Cloudy
- Game attendance: 19,151
- Referee: Stephen LaManti
- TV announcers (ESPN+): Bobby Rosinski, Jay Sonnhalter, Libby Clark
- AppStateSports.com Box Score

Game information

First quarter

- APP – Chandler Staton, 31-yard field goal, 10:25 (APP 3–0)
- APP – Zac Thomas, 5-yard TD run, (Chandler Staton kick), 1:03 (APP 10–0)

Second quarter

- CHL – Jonathan Cruz, 46-yard field goal, 9:05 (APP 10–3)
- APP – Corey Sutton, 27-yard TD pass from Zac Thomas, (Chandler Staton kick), 6:46 (APP 17–3)
- CHL – Jonathan Cruz, 54-yard field goal, 1:37 (APP 17–6)
- APP – Dominique Heath, 7-yard TD pass from Zac Thomas, (Chandler Staton kick), 0:43 (APP 24–6)
- CHL – Jonathan Cruz, 48-yard field goal, 0:08 (APP 24–9)

Third quarter

- APP – Thomas Hennigan, 59-yard punt return for TD, (Chandler Staton kick), 6:01 (APP 31–9)

Fourth quarter

- APP – Corey Sutton, 90-yard TD pass from Zac Thomas, (Chandler Staton kick), 14:45 (APP 38–9)
- APP – Austin Exford, 0-yard fumble return for TD, (Chandler Staton kick), 9:28 (APP 45–9)

Top passers

- APP – Zac Thomas – 14/14, 295 yards, 3 TD
- CHL – Chris Reynolds – 12/22, 108 yards, INT

Top rushers

- APP – Jalin Moore – 11 carries, 38 yards
- CHL – Benny Lemay – 7 carries, 35 yards

Top receivers

- APP – Corey Sutton – 3 receptions, 155 yards, 2 TD
- CHL – Victor Tucker – 4 receptions, 33 yards

Top defenders

- APP – Akeem Davis-Gaither – 8 tackles, 0.5 tackles-for-loss (TFL)
- APP – Desmond Franklin – 3 tackles, interception
- CHL – Ben DeLuca – 11 tackles, fumble recovery

=== Gardner–Webb ===
Gardner–Webb at Appalachian State – Game summary

Quarter	1	2	3	4	Total
Gardner–Webb	7	0	0	0	7
App State	28	24	14	6	72

at Kidd Brewer Stadium, Boone, North Carolina

- Date: September 22
- Game time: 3:35 p.m. EDT
- Game weather: 75 °F (24 °C); Mostly cloudy
- Game attendance: 21,084
- Referee: Marshall Lewis
- TV announcers (ESPN+): Harrison Battle, Pierre Banks
- AppStateSports.com Box Score

Game information

First quarter

- APP – Dominique Heath, 64-yard TD pass from Zac Thomas, (Chandler Staton kick), 14:00 (APP 0–7)
- APP - Steven Jones Jr., 0-yard blocked punt return for a TD, (Chandler Staton kick), 11:53 (APP 0–14)
- GWU – Jonathan Blackmon, 14-yard TD Pass from Jordan Smith, (Tre' Jackson kick), 7:55 (APP 7–14)
- APP – Jalin Moore, 1-yard TD run, (Chandler Staton kick), 2:32 (APP 7–21)
- APP – Jalin Moore, 81-yard TD run, (Chandler Staton kick), 0:08 (APP 7–28)

Second quarter

- APP – Darrynton Evans, 9-yard TD run, (Chandler Staton kick), 14:06 (APP 7–35)
- APP - Clifton Duck, 62-yard punt return for a TD, (Chandler Staton kick), 12:42 (APP 7–42)
- APP – Zac Thomas, 12-yard TD run, (Chandler Staton kick), 9:50 (APP 7–49)
- APP – Chandler Staton, 33-yard field goal, 0:00 (APP 7–52)

Third quarter

- APP – Dominique Heath, 19-yard TD pass from Peyton Derrick, (Michael Rubino kick), 7:18 (APP 7–59)
- APP – Peyton Derrick, 3-yard TD run, (Michael Rubino kick), 0:42 (APP 7–66)

Fourth quarter

- APP – D'Andre Hicks, 73-yard TD run, (Michael Rubino kick failed), 3:13 (APP 7–72)

Top passers

- GWU – Jordan Smith – 13/27, 117 yards, TD, 2 INT
- APP – Zac Thomas – 11/15, 185 yards, 1 TD
- APP – Peyton Derrick – 7/7, 68 yards, TD

Top rushers

- GWU – Jaylen Myers – 7 carries, 15 yards
- APP – D'Andre Hicks – 11 carries, 150 yards, TD
- APP – Jalin Moore – 8 carries, 120 yards, 2 TD

Top receivers

- GWU – Jonathan Blackmon – 9 receptions, 57 yards, TD
- APP – Dominique Heath – 4 receptions, 111 yards, 2 TD

Top defenders

- GWU – A. J. Keene – 7 tackles
- APP – Desmond Franklin – tackle, interception
- APP – Kaiden Smith – tackle, interception

=== South Alabama ===
South Alabama at Appalachian State – Game summary

Quarter	1	2	3	4	Total
South Alabama	7	0	0	0	7
App State	21	21	3	7	52

at Kidd Brewer Stadium, Boone, North Carolina

- Date: September 29
- Game time: 3:35 p.m. EDT
- Game weather: 71 °F (22 °C); partly cloudy
- Game attendance: 25,862
- Referee: Kyle Olson
- TV announcers (ESPN+): Harrison Battle, Pierre Banks
- AppStateSports.com AppStateSports.com Box Score

Game information

First quarter

- APP – Zac Thomas, 54-yard TD run, (Chandler Staton kick), 13:11 (APP 0–7)
- USA - Kawaan Baker, 2-yard TD run, (Gavin Patterson kick), 6:12 (TIE 7–7)
- APP – Jalin Moore, 7-yard TD run, (Chandler Staton kick), 5:37 (APP 7–14)
- APP – Zac Thomas, 7-yard TD run, (Chandler Staton kick), 3:10 (APP 7–21)

Second quarter

- APP - Corey Sutton, 2-yard TD pass from Zac Thomas, (Chandler Staton kick), 12:22 (APP 7–28)
- APP – Jalin Moore, 2-yard TD run, (Chandler Staton kick), 4:45 (APP 7–35)
- APP – Marcus Williams, 27-yard TD pass from Zac Thomas, (Chandler Staton kick), 2:41 (APP 7–42)

Third quarter

- APP – Chandler Staton, 23-yard field goal, 0:46 (APP 7–45)

Fourth quarter

- APP – Collin Reed, 3-yard TD pass from Peyton Derrick, (Chandler Staton kick), 3:04 (APP 7–52)

Top passers

- USA – Evan Orth – 20/33, 225 yards, INT
- APP – Zac Thomas – 8/18, 146 yards, 2 TD, 2 INT

Top rushers

- USA – Tra Minter – 9 carries, 44 yards
- APP – Jalin Moore – 19 carries, 123 yards, 2 TD

Top receivers

- USA – Kawaan Baker – 4 receptions, 89 yards
- APP – Thomas Hennigan – 4 receptions, 65 yards
- APP – Corey Sutton – 2 receptions, 46 yards, TD

Top defenders

- USA – Nigel Lawrence – 7 tackles
- APP – Akeem Davis-Gaither – 8 tackles, 1.5 tackles-for-loss (TFL)
- APP – Tae Hayes – 4 tackles, interception

=== At Arkansas State ===
Appalachian State at Arkansas State – Game summary

Quarter	1	2	3	4	Total
App State	0	21	7	7	35
Arkansas State	3	6	0	0	9

at Centennial Bank Stadium, Jonesboro, AR

- Date: October 9
- Game time: 8:00 p.m. EDT
- Game attendance: 21,421
- Referee: Ted Pitts
- TV announcers (ESPN2): Chris Cotter, Rocky Boiman
- AppStateSports.com Box Score

Game information

First quarter

- A-ST – Blake Grupe 31 yard field goal, 9:39 (A-ST 0–3)

Second quarter

- A-ST – Blake Grupe 47 yard field goal, 12:54 (A-ST 0–6)
- APP – Jalin Moore 27 yard TD run (Chandler Staton Extra Point), 11:13 (APP 7–6)
- A-ST – Blake Grupe 33 yard field goal, 4:37 (A-ST 7–9)
- APP – Corey Sutton 25 yard TD pass from Zac Thomas (Chandler Staton Extra Point), 2:57 (APP 14–9)
- APP – Darrynton Evans 1 yard TD run (Chandler Staton Extra Point), 0:45 (APP 21–9)

Third quarter

- APP – Collin Reed 3 yard TD pass from Zac Thomas (Chandler Staton Extra Point), 2:52 (APP 28–9)

Fourth quarter

- APP – Zac Thomas 62 yard TD run (Chandler Staton Extra Point), 6:09 (APP 35–9)

Top passers

- APP – Zac Thomas – 12/27, 144 yards, 2 TD
- A-ST – Justice Hansen – 25/40, 209 yards, 3 INT

Top rushers

- APP – Darrynton Evans – 16 carries, 115 yards, TD
- APP – Zac Thomas – 6 carries, 76 yards, TD
- A-ST – Marcel Murray – 11 carries, 37 yards

Top receivers

- APP – Jalen Virgil – 2 receptions, 47 yards
- APP – Corey Sutton – 1 receptions, 25 yards, TD
- A-ST – Kirk Merritt – 9 receptions, 73 yards

Top defenders

- APP – Akeem Davis-Gaither – 14 tackles
- APP – Jordan Fehr – 14 tackles, sack
- A-ST – Tajhe Chambers – 10 tackles, 2.5 tackles-for-loss (TFL)

=== Louisiana ===
Louisiana at Appalachian State – Game summary

Quarter	1	2	3	4	Total
Louisiana	7	3	0	7	17
App State	7	10	7	3	27

at Kidd Brewer Stadium, Boone, North Carolina

- Date: October 20
- Game time: 3:35 p.m. EDT
- Game weather: 54 °F (12 °C); partly cloudy
- Game attendance: 27,082
- Referee: Kyle Olson
- TV announcers (ESPN+): Harrison Battle, Pierre Banks
- AppStateSports.com Box Score

Game information

First quarter

- APP – Darrynton Evans 2 yard TD run (Chandler Staton Extra Point), 3:46 (APP 0–7)
- LA – Elijah Mitchell 38 yard TD pass from Levi Lewis (Kyle Pfau Extra Point), 0:41 (TIE 7–7)

Second quarter

- APP – Chandler Staton, 40 yard field goal, 13:10 (APP 7–10)
- LA – Kyle Pfau, 43 yard field goal, 9:02 (TIE 10–10)
- APP – Darrynton Evans 20 yard TD pass from Zac Thomas (Chandler Staton Extra Point), 2:11 (APP 10–17)

Third quarter

- APP – Marcus Williams 6 yard TD run (Chandler Staton Extra Point), 14:01 (APP 10–24)

Fourth quarter

- APP – Chandler Staton, 29 yard field goal, 2:46 (APP 10–27)
- LA – Trey Ragas 27 yard TD run (Kyle Pfau Extra Point), 1:03 (APP 17–27)

Top passers

- LA – Andre Nunez – 14/23, 108 yards
- APP – Zac Thomas – 10/20, 106 yards, TD, INT

Top rushers

- LA – Trey Ragas – 18 carries, 81 yards, TD
- APP – Darrynton Evans – 26 carries, 183 yards, TD

Top receivers

- LA – Ryheem Malone – 3 receptions, 47 yards
- LA – Elijah Mitchell – 2 receptions, 47 yards, TD
- APP – Henry Pearson – 2 receptions, 38 yards

Top defenders

- LA – Corey Turner – 11 tackles, 0.5 tackles-for-loss (TFL)
- APP – Akeem Davis-Gaither – 15 tackles, sack, 2 tackles-for-loss (TFL)
- APP – Noel Cook – 13 tackles, sack, 2 tackles-for-loss (TFL)

=== At Georgia Southern ===
Appalachian State at Georgia Southern – Game summary

Quarter	1	2	3	4	Total
No. 25 App State	0	7	0	7	14
Georgia Southern	0	17	10	7	34

at Paulson Stadium, Statesboro, Georgia

- Date: October 25
- Game time: 7:32 p.m. EDT
- Game weather: 64 °F (18 °C); light mist
- Game attendance: 19,252
- Referee: Marshall Lewis
- TV announcers (ESPNU): Doug Sherman, Roddy Jones
- AppStateSports.com Game Notes AppStateSports.com Box Score

Game information

First quarter
Second quarter

- GS – Darion Anderson 57 yard TD pass from Shai Werts (Tyler Bass Extra Point), 14:37 (GS 0–7)
- APP – Marcus Williams Jr. 1 yard TD run (Chandler Staton Extra Point), 12:11 (TIE 7–7)
- GS – Wesley Fields 10 yard TD run (Tyler Bass Extra Point), 9:53 (GS 7–14)
- GS – Tyler Bass 42 yard field goal, 4:45 (GS 7–17)

Third quarter

- GS – Shai Werts 47 yard TD run (Tyler Bass Extra Point), 10:05 (GS 7–24)
- GS – Tyler Bass 43 yard field goal, 1:34 (GS 7–27)

Fourth quarter

- GS – Wesley Fields 18 yard TD run (Tyler Bass Extra Point), 3:28 (GS 7–34)
- APP – Malik Williams 4 yard TD pass from Jacob Huesman (Chandler Staton Extra Point), 0:10 (GS 14–34)

Top passers

- APP – Jacob Huesman – 8/14, 67 yards, TD, 2 INT
- GS – Shai Werts – 1/3, 57 yards, TD

Top rushers

- APP – Darrynton Evans – 16 carries, 63 yards
- GS – Shai Werts – 14 carries, 129 yards, TD
- GS – Wesley Fields – 18 carries, 98 yards, 2 TD

Top receivers

- APP – Corey Sutton – 4 receptions, 64 yards
- GS – Darion Anderson – 1 reception, 57 yards, TD

Top defenders

- APP – Anthony Flory – 10 tackles, tackle-for-loss (TFL)
- GS – Kenderick Duncan – 5 tackles, forced fumble, interception
- GS – Kindle Vildor – 2 tackles, 2 interceptions

=== At Coastal Carolina ===
Appalachian State at Coastal Carolina – Game summary

Quarter	1	2	3	4	Total
App State	7	7	0	9	23
Coastal Carolina	7	0	0	0	7

at Brooks Stadium, Conway, South Carolina

- Date: November 3
- Game time: 5:05 p.m. EDT
- Game weather: 65 °F (18 °C)
- Game attendance: 13,004
- Referee: Ted Pitts
- TV announcers (ESPN+): Jeff McCarragher, Nate Ross
- AppStateSports.com Box Score AppStateSports.com Game Notes

Game information

First quarter

- APP – Darrynton Evans 26 yard TD run (Chandler Staton kick), 10:16 (APP 7–0)
- CCU – Derambez Drinkard 60 yard interception return (Massimo Biscardi kick), 5:57 (TIED 7–7)

Second quarter

- APP – Corey Sutton 33 yard TD pass from Jacob Huesman (Chandler Staton kick), 1:40 (APP 14–7)

Third quarter
Fourth quarter

- APP – TEAM safety, 11:33 (APP 16–7)
- APP – Marcus Williams 1 yard TD run (Chandler Staton kick), 9:54 (APP 23–7)

Top passers

- APP – Jacob Huesman – 9/19, 127 yards, TD, 2 INT
- CCU – Fred Payton – 10/16, 79 yards, INT

Top rushers

- APP – Darrynton Evans – 27 carries, 159 yards, TD
- APP – Marcus Williams – 19 carries, 103 yards, TD
- CCU – Kilton Anderson – 3 carries, 22 yards

Top receivers

- APP – Dominique Heath – 4 receptions, 55 yards
- CCU – Malcolm Williams – 5 receptions, 32 yards

Top defenders

- APP – Jordan Fehr – 8 tackles, 3 sacks, 3.5 tackles-for-loss (TFL)
- CCU – Teddy Gallagher – 14 tackles, sack, tackle-for-loss (TFL)

=== At Texas State ===
Appalachian State at Texas State – Game summary

Quarter	1	2	3	4	Total
App State	7	14	7	10	38
Texas State	0	0	7	0	7

at Bobcat Stadium, San Marcos, Texas

- Date: November 10
- Game time: 4:05 p.m. EDT
- Game weather: 53 °F (12 °C); cloudy
- Game attendance: 11,482
- Referee: Jeremy Parker
- TV announcers (ESPN3): David Saltzman, Steve Foster, Megan Birdsong
- AppStateSports.com Box Score AppStateSports.com Game Notes

Game information

First quarter

- APP – Dominique Heath 8 yard TD pass from Zac Thomas (Chandler Staton kick), 12:04 (APP 7–0)

Second quarter

- APP – Collin Reed 1 yard TD pass from Zac Thomas (Chandler Staton kick), 14:14 (APP 14–0)
- APP – Darrynton Evans 1 yard TD run (Chandler Staton kick), 1:20 (APP 21–0)

Third quarter

- APP – Darrynton Evans 79 yard TD run (Chandler Staton kick), 14:36 (APP 28–0)
- TXST – Keenen Brown 6 yard TD pass from Tyler Vitt (Chris Kessler kick), 8:00 (APP 28–7)

Fourth quarter

- APP – Chandler Staton 29 yard field goal, 14:50 (APP 31–7)
- APP – Camerun Peoples 9 yard TD run (Chandler Staton kick), 2:01 (APP 38–7)

Top passers

- APP – Zac Thomas – 25/36, 247 yards, 2 TD
- TXST – Tyler Vitt – 17/28, 106 yards, TD, INT

Top rushers

- APP – Darrynton Evans – 9 carries, 86 yards, 2 TD
- TXST – Caleb Twyford – 11 carries, 35 yards

Top receivers

- APP – Jalen Virgil – 5 receptions, 51 yards
- APP – Dominique Heath – 4 receptions, 38 yards, TD
- TXST – Keenen Brown – 7 receptions, 44 yards, TD

Top defenders

- APP – Jordan Fehr – 9 tackles, 0.5 TFL
- TXST – Nikolas Daniels – 13 tackles, 0.5 TFL

=== Georgia State ===
Georgia State at Appalachian State– Game summary

Quarter	1	2	3	4	Total
Georgia State	7	0	3	7	17
App State	14	3	14	14	45

at Kidd Brewer Stadium, Boone, North Carolina

- Date: November 17
- Game time: 2:35 p.m. EDT
- Game weather: 55 °F (13 °C); clear, sunny
- Game attendance: 22,315
- Referee: Ted Pitts
- TV: ESPN+
- AppStateSports.com Box Score

Game information

First quarter

- GSU – Tamir Jones 7 yard TD pass from Dan Ellington (Brandon Wright kick), 10:17 (GSU 7–0)
- APP – Corey Sutton 39 yard TD pass from Zac Thomas (Chandler Staton kick), 8:54 (TIED 7–7)
- APP – Henry Pearson 10 yard TD pass from Zac Thomas (Chandler Staton kick), 3:16 (APP 7–14)

Second quarter

- APP – Chandler Staton 23 yard field goal, 0:11 (APP 7–17)

Third quarter

- APP – Zac Thomas 1 yard TD run (Chandler Staton kick), 9:16 (APP 7–24)
- APP – Desmond Franklin 26 yard interception return (Chandler Staton kick), 1:20 (APP 7–31)
- GSU – Brandon Wright 52 yard field goal, 2:42 (APP 10–31)

Fourth quarter

- APP – Dominique Heath 21 yard TD pass from Zac Thomas (Chandler Staton kick), 14:18 (APP 10–38)
- APP – Darrynton Evans 56 yard TD run (Chandler Staton kick), 12:04 (APP 10–45)
- GSU – Demarcus Kirk 3 yard TD run (Brandon Wright kick), 8:20 (APP 17–45)

Top passers

- GSU – Dan Ellington – 10/21, 132 yards, TD, 2 INT
- APP – Zac Thomas – 20/24, 282 yards, 3 TD

Top rushers

- GSU – Dan Ellington – 19 carries, 113 yards
- APP – Darrynton Evans – 15 carries, 127 yards, TD

Top receivers

- GSU – Penny Hart – 2 receptions, 50 yards
- APP – Corey Sutton – 4 receptions, 101 yards, TD

Top defenders

- GSU – Chris Bacon – 7 tackles
- APP – Desmond Franklin – 3 tackles, 2 INT

=== Troy ===
Troy at Appalachian State – Game summary

Quarter	1	2	3	4	Total
Troy	0	3	7	0	10
App State	7	14	0	0	21

at Kidd Brewer Stadium, Boone, North Carolina

- Date: November 24
- Game time: 2:35 p.m. EDT
- Game weather: 41 °F (5 °C); mostly cloudy
- Game attendance: 20,410
- Referee: Jason Autrey
- TV: ESPN+
- AppStateSports.com Box Score

Game information

First quarter

- APP – Corey Sutton 16 yard TD pass from Zac Thomas (Chandler Staton kick), 5:50 (APP 0–7)

Second quarter

- APP – Corey Sutton 15 yard TD pass from Zac Thomas (Chandler Staton kick), 13:42 (APP 0–14)
- APP – Zac Thomas 10 yard TD run (Chandler Staton kick), 11:09 (APP 0–21)
- TROY – Tyler Sumpter 26 yard field goal, 7:51 (APP 3–21)

Third quarter

- TROY – Deondre Douglas 21 yard TD pass from Sawyer Smith (Tyler Sumpter kick), 9:21 (APP 10–21)

Fourth quarter

Top passers

- TROY – Sawyer Smith – 17/34, 160 yards, TD, 2 INT
- APP – Zac Thomas – 12/24, 113 yards, 2 TD

Top rushers

- TROY – B.J. Smith – 15 carries, 53 yards
- APP – Darrynton Evans – 20 carries, 108 yards

Top receivers

- TROY – Deondre Douglas – 6 receptions, 69 yards, TD
- APP – Corey Sutton – 5 receptions, 72 yards, 2 TD

Top defenders

- TROY – Tron Folsom – 11 tackles, 1.5 TFL
- APP – Akeem Davis-Gaither – 14 tackles, 2 TFL
- APP – Jordan Fehr – 8 tackles, sack

=== Louisiana (Sun Belt Championship game) ===
Louisiana at Appalachian State – Game summary

Quarter	1	2	3	4	Total
Louisiana	3	3	10	3	19
App State	7	7	6	10	30

at Kidd Brewer Stadium, Boone, North Carolina

- Date: December 1
- Game time: 12:03 p.m. EDT
- Game weather: 44 °F (7 °C); rainy
- Game attendance: 14,963
- Referee: Ted Pitts
- TV: ESPN
- AppStateSports.com Box Score

Game information

First quarter

- LA – Kyle Pfau 37 yard field goal, 10:13 (LA 3–0)
- APP – Marcus Williams 1 yard TD run (Chandler Staton kick), 9:56 (APP 3–7)

Second quarter

- LA – Kyle Pfau 45 yard field goal, 8:17 (APP 6–7)
- APP – Zac Thomas 25 yard TD run (Chandler Staton kick), 3:17 (APP 6–14)

Third quarter

- APP – Chandler Staton 42 yard field goal, 12:19 (APP 6–17)
- LA – Andre Nunez 8 yard TD run (Kyle Pfau kick), 10:34 (APP 13–17)
- LA – Kyle Pfau 23 yard field goal, 5:00 (APP 16–17)
- APP – Chandler Staton 42 yard field goal, 0:00 (APP 16–20)

Fourth quarter

- APP – Zac Thomas 35 yard TD run (Chandler Staton kick), 11:43 (APP 16–27)
- LA – Kyle Pfau 24 yard field goal, 6:01 (APP 19–27)
- APP – Chandler Staton 43 yard field goal, 2:09 (APP 19–30)

Top passers

- LA – Andre Nunez – 10/21, 85 yards, 2 INT
- APP – Zac Thomas – 6/13, 75 yards

Top rushers

- LA – Trey Ragas – 16 carries, 101 yards
- APP – Darrynton Evans – 17 carries, 111 yards

Top receivers

- LA – J. Bradley – 4 receptions, 41 yards
- APP – Corey Sutton – 2 receptions, 23 yards
- APP – Collin Reed – 2 receptions, 23 yards

Top defenders

- LA – J. Middleton – 9 tackles, 0.5 TFL
- APP – Anthony Flory – 11 tackles, QBH
- APP – Tae Hayes – 9 tackles, INT

=== Vs. Middle Tennessee (New Orleans Bowl) ===
Middle Tennessee vs Appalachian State – Game summary

Quarter	1	2	3	4	Total
Middle Tennessee	3	3	7	0	13
App State	0	24	14	7	45

at Mercedes-Benz Superdome, New Orleans, Louisiana

- Date: December 15
- Game time: 9:00 p.m. EDT
- Game weather: Indoors
- Game attendance: 23,942
- TV: ESPN

Game information

First quarter

- MTSU - Crews Holt 24-yard field goal, 5:15 (MTSU 3-0)

Second quarter

- APP - Chandler Staton 22-yard field goal, 13:48 (TIE 3-3)
- APP - Thomas Hennigan 30-yard TD pass from Malik Williams, Staton kick good, 10:06 (APP 10-3)
- APP - Zac Thomas 8-yard TD pass from Williams, Staton kick good, 6:38 (APP 17-3)
- APP - Henry Pearson 1-yard TD pass from Thomas, 0:45 (APP 24-3)
- MTSU - Holt 33-yard field goal, 0:00 (APP 24-6)

Third quarter

- APP - Corey Sutton 17-yard TD pass from Thomas, Staton kick good, 11:06 (APP 31-6)
- APP - Camerun Peoples 63-yard TD run, Staton kick good, 8:01 (APP 38-6)
- MTSU - Isiah Upton 43-yard TD pass from Brent Stockstill, Holt kick good, 5:56 (APP 38-13)

Fourth quarter

- APP – Sutton 11-yard TD pass from Thomas, Staton kick good, 13:06 (APP 45-13)

Top passers

- MTSU - Brent Stockstill - 25/37, 330 yards, TD, 2 INT
- APP – Zac Thomas – 15/24, 177 yards, 3 TD, 2 INT

Top rushers

- MTSU - Chaton Mobley - 10 carries, 45 yards
- APP – Darrynton Evans – 14 carries, 108 yards

Top receivers

- MTSU - Gatlin Casey - 6 receptions, 64 yards
- APP – Corey Sutton – 8 receptions, 78 yards, 2 TD

== Rankings ==
Ranking movements Legend: ██ Increase in ranking ██ Decrease in ranking — = Not ranked RV = Received votes
	Week															
Poll	Pre	1	2	3	4	5	6	7	8	9	10	11	12	13	14	Final
AP	—	—	—	—	—	RV	RV	RV	25	—	—	—	—	RV	RV	RV
Coaches	RV	RV	RV	RV	RV	RV	RV	RV	RV	—	RV	RV	RV	RV	RV	RV
CFP	Not released									—	—	—	—	—	—	Not released
