= 2021 Appalachian State Mountaineers football team =

American college football season

2021 Appalachian State Mountaineers football

Sun Belt East Division champion

Sun Belt Championship Game, L 16–24 vs. Louisiana

Boca Raton Bowl, L 38–59 vs. Western Kentucky
- Conference: Sun Belt Conference
- East Division
- Record: 10–4 (7–1 Sun Belt)
- Head coach: Shawn Clark (2nd season)
- Offensive coordinator: Frank Ponce (1st season)
- Offensive scheme: Pro tempo
- Defensive coordinator: Dale Jones (5th season)
- Base defense: 3–4
- Home stadium: Kidd Brewer Stadium

2021 Sun Belt Conference football standings
	Conf.			Overall
Team	W		L	W		L
East Division
Appalachian State xy	7	–	1	10	–	4
Georgia State	6	–	2	8	–	5
Coastal Carolina	6	–	2	11	–	2
Troy	3	–	5	5	–	7
Georgia Southern	2	–	6	3	–	9
West Division
No. 16 Louisiana xy$	8	–	0	13	–	1
Texas State	3	–	5	4	–	8
Louisiana–Monroe	2	–	6	4	–	8
South Alabama	2	–	6	5	–	7
Arkansas State	1	–	7	2	–	10
Championship: Louisiana 24, Appalachian State 16
$ – Conference champion; x – Division champion/co-champions; y – Championship game participant; Rankings from AP Poll

The 2021 Appalachian State Mountaineers football team represented Appalachian State University during the 2021 NCAA Division I FBS football season. The Mountaineers were led by second-year head coach Shawn Clark. Appalachian State played their home games at Kidd Brewer Stadium on the school's Boone, North Carolina, campus, and competed as a member of the East Division of the Sun Belt Conference.

== Preseason ==
=== Recruiting class ===
College recruiting information
Name	Hometown	School	Height	Weight	40^{‡}	Commit date
Kyle Arnholt; LB	Roanoke, VA	Lord Botetourt HS	6 ft 2 in (1.88 m)	200 lb (91 kg)	–	Jul 16, 2020
Kyle Arnholt; LB	Recruit ratings: Scout: Rivals: 247Sports: ESPN:					
Da'Shawn Brown; WR	York, South Carolina	York Comprehensive HS	6 ft 1 in (1.85 m)	170 lb (77 kg)	–	Dec 16, 2020
Da'Shawn Brown; WR	Recruit ratings: Scout: Rivals: 247Sports: ESPN:					
Troy Everett; OL	Daleville, VA	Lord Botetourt HS	6 ft 3 in (1.91 m)	280 lb (130 kg)	–	May 25, 2020
Troy Everett; OL	Recruit ratings: Scout: Rivals: 247Sports: ESPN:					
Cole Essek; OL	Tampa, FL	Tampa Catholic HS	6 ft 6 in (1.98 m)	240 lb (110 kg)	–	Jun 2, 2020
Cole Essek; OL	Recruit ratings: Scout: Rivals: 247Sports: ESPN:					
Jordan Favors; DB	Griffin, GA	Griffin HS	5 ft 11 in (1.80 m)	190 lb (86 kg)	–	Dec 16, 2020
Jordan Favors; DB	Recruit ratings: Scout: Rivals: 247Sports: ESPN:					
Andre Goodman; QB	Piedmont, SC	Greenville HS	6 ft 1 in (1.85 m)	190 lb (86 kg)	–	Feb 3, 2021
Andre Goodman; QB	Recruit ratings: Scout: Rivals: 247Sports: ESPN:					
Michael Hughes; K	Charleston, WV	George Washington HS	6 ft 3 in (1.91 m)	160 lb (73 kg)	–	Sep 16, 2020
Michael Hughes; K	Recruit ratings: Scout: Rivals: 247Sports: ESPN:					
Justin Isler; DL	Villa Rica, GA	Temple HS	6 ft 230 in (7.67 m)	N/A	–	Jun 10, 2020
Justin Isler; DL	Recruit ratings: Scout: Rivals: 247Sports: ESPN:					
David Larkins; TE	North Bend, OH	Elder HS	6 ft 5 in (1.96 m)	230 lb (100 kg)	–	Jun 8, 2020
David Larkins; TE	Recruit ratings: Scout: Rivals: 247Sports: ESPN:					
Jaden Lindsay; OL	Winston-Salem, NC	East Forsyth HS	6 ft 3 in (1.91 m)	285 lb (129 kg)	–	May 13, 2020
Jaden Lindsay; OL	Recruit ratings: Scout: Rivals: 247Sports: ESPN:					
Jaquan Lowman; WR	Zellwood, FL	Apopka HS	6 ft 1 in (1.85 m)	180 lb (82 kg)	–	Jul 31, 2020
Jaquan Lowman; WR	Recruit ratings: Scout: Rivals: 247Sports: ESPN:					
Deshawn McKnight; LB	Sumter, SC	Sumter HS	6 ft 3 in (1.91 m)	224 lb (102 kg)	–	Dec 16, 2020
Deshawn McKnight; LB	Recruit ratings: Scout: Rivals: 247Sports: ESPN:					
Travis McNichols; DB	Miami Gardens, FL	Miami Northwestern HS	5 ft 8 in (1.73 m)	170 lb (77 kg)	–	Jun 4, 2020
Travis McNichols; DB	Recruit ratings: Scout: Rivals: 247Sports: ESPN:					
Trevor Moffitt; LB	Bushnell, FL	South Sumter HS	6 ft 1 in (1.85 m)	200 lb (91 kg)	–	Feb 3, 2021
Trevor Moffitt; LB	Recruit ratings: Scout: Rivals: 247Sports: ESPN:					
Colston Powers; OL	Blue Ridge, VA	Lord Botetourt HS	6 ft 4 in (1.93 m)	285 lb (129 kg)	–	Jan 25, 2020
Colston Powers; OL	Recruit ratings: Scout: Rivals: 247Sports: ESPN:					
Jayden Ramsey; OL	Anderson, SC	Westside HS	6 ft 6 in (1.98 m)	260 lb (120 kg)	–	Feb 3, 2021
Jayden Ramsey; OL	Recruit ratings: Scout: Rivals: 247Sports: ESPN:					
Jonathan Streeter; DB	Cary, NC	Panther Creek HS	5 ft 11 in (1.80 m)	175 lb (79 kg)	–	Aug 24, 2020
Jonathan Streeter; DB	Recruit ratings: Scout: Rivals: 247Sports: ESPN:					
Dalton Stroman; WR	Rockingham, NC	Richmond Senior HS	6 ft 4 in (1.93 m)	200 lb (91 kg)	–	Aug 9, 2020
Dalton Stroman; WR	Recruit ratings: Scout: Rivals: 247Sports: ESPN:					
Cade Sullivan; DB	Inman, SC	Boiling Springs HS	6 ft 2 in (1.88 m)	195 lb (88 kg)	–	Jun 12, 2020
Cade Sullivan; DB	Recruit ratings: Scout: Rivals: 247Sports: ESPN:					
Coen Sutton; WR	Huntersville, NC	Hough HS	6 ft 2 in (1.88 m)	205 lb (93 kg)	–	Jul 6, 2020
Coen Sutton; WR	Recruit ratings: Scout: Rivals: 247Sports: ESPN:					
DC Tabscott; QB	Franklin, TN	Father Ryan HS	6 ft 4 in (1.93 m)	200 lb (91 kg)	–	Apr 4, 2020
DC Tabscott; QB	Recruit ratings: Scout: Rivals: 247Sports: ESPN:					
KaRon White; DL	Madison, AL	Sparkman HS	6 ft 2 in (1.88 m)	275 lb (125 kg)	–	Jun 20, 2020
KaRon White; DL	Recruit ratings: Scout: Rivals: 247Sports: ESPN:					

=== Award watch lists ===
Listed in the order that they were released

==== Preseason ====
Award	Player	Position	Year
Maxwell Award	Camerun Peoples	RB	JR
Chuck Bednarik Award	Demetrius Taylor	DL	SR
Chuck Bednarik Award	Shaun Jolly	CB	SR
Doak Walker Award	Camerun Peoples	RB	JR
Rimington Trophy	Baer Hunter	OL	SR
Mackey Award	Henry Pearson	TE	SR
Jim Thorpe Award	Shaun Jolly	CB	SR
Outland Trophy	Baer Hunter	OL	SR
Bronko Nagurski Trophy	Demetrius Taylor	DL	SR
Ray Guy Award	Xavier Subotsch	P	SR
Wuerffel Trophy	Thomas Hennigan	WR	SR
Paul Hornung Award	Caleb Spurlin	DL	SR
Walter Camp Award	Demetrius Taylor	DL	SR

=== Sun Belt coaches poll ===
The Sun Belt coaches poll was released on July 20, 2021. The Mountaineers were picked to finish tied for first in the East Division and third overall in the conference.

=== Sun Belt Preseason All-Conference teams ===
Offense

1st team

- Camerun Peoples – Running back, JR
- Baer Hunter – Offensive lineman, SR
- Cooper Hodges – Offensive lineman, JR

2nd team

- Daetrich Harrington – Running back, SR
- Thomas Hennigan – Wide receiver, SR

Defense

1st team

- Demetrius Taylor – Defensive lineman, SR
- D'Marco Jackson – Linebacker, SR
- Shaun Jolly – Defensive back, SR

2nd team

- Brendan Harrington – Linebacker, JR

== Personnel ==
2021 Appalachian State Mountaineers football team roster
Players
Coaches
Offense

Pos.	#	Name	Class
WR	0	Milan Tucker	So
WR	2	Corey Sutton	Sr
WR	3	Jacoby Pinckney	So
WR	5	Thomas Hennigan	Sr
RB	6	Camerun Peoples	Jr
QB	7	Chase Brice	Sr
QB	8	Navy Shuler	Fr
QB	9	DC Tabscott	Fr
QB	10	Tanner Wilson	Sr
WR	11	Jalen Virgil	Sr
WR	12	Da'Shawn Brown	Fr
WR	13	Christan Horn	So
WR	14	Malik Williams	Sr
WR	15	Austyn Chestnut	Sr
WR	16	Christian Wells	So
WR	17	Dashuan Davis	So
TE	18	Mike Evans	Sr
WR	19	Elijah Johnson	Fr
RB	20	Nate Noel	So
WR	22	Michael Hetzel	Fr
RB	24	Ben Williams	So
WR	25	Sean Horton	So
RB	33	Logan Cruce	Fr
RB	44	Anderson Castle	So
RB	45	Gabe Montgomery	Sr
OL	51	Baer Hunter	Sr
OL	54	Lyle Hiers	So
OL	55	Seth Williams	Fr
OL	64	Chris Lyle	Fr
OL	65	Gage Blackston	Sr
OL	66	Luke Smith	So
OL	70	Cooper Hodges	Jr
OL	72	Larry Dowdy	So
OL	73	Jaden Lindsay	Fr
OL	74	Anderson Hardy	Jr
OL	75	Damion Daley	Jr
OL	76	Austin Reeves	Fr
OL	77	Colston Powers	Fr
OL	78	Craig McFarland	So
OL	79	Sammy Henderson	So
WR	80	AJ Hall	Jr
TE	81	Miller Gibbs	Jr
WR	82	Richard Tucker	Jr
WR	83	Coen Sutton	Fr
TE	84	Peter Hennigan	Fr
TE	86	Trey Ross	Jr
TE	87	Eli Wilson	Fr
TE	88	Henry Pearson	Sr
TE	89	August Drews	Fr

Defense

Pos.	#	Name	Class
DB	2	Kaleb Dawson	Jr
DB	3	Shaun Jolly	Sr
DB	4	Nicholas Ross	Jr
ILB	7	Trey Cobb	Sr
DL	9	Demetrius Taylor	Sr
OLB	10	Tim Frizzell	Sr
DB	12	Steven Jones Jr.	Sr
DB	13	Kaiden Smith	Sr
DB	14	Tre Caldwell	So
DB	14	Travis McNichols	Fr
ILB	15	T. D. Roof	Sr
DB	16	Stan Ellis	Fr
DB	17	Tommy Wright	So
DB	19	Mike Smith	So
LB	20	Je'Mari Littlejohn	Fr
DB	21	Ryan Huff	Sr
DB	25	Jackson Greene	So
DB	26	Caden Sullivan	Fr
DB	27	Ronald Clarke	Fr
OLB	28	KeSean Brown	Jr
OLB	29	Brendan Harrington	Jr
DL	30	Zareon Hayes	Jr
OLB	31	Nick Hampton	Jr
ILB	33	Jordan Mitchell	Jr
ILB	34	Jourdan Heilig	Jr
LB	35	Jalen McLeod	So
DL	36	Kevon Haigler	Fr
ILB	40	Logan Doublin	Sr
DL	43	Hansky Paillant	Jr
DL	46	Chris Washington	Jr
OLB	47	Colin Guentensberger	So
DL	48	DeShawn McKnight	Fr
LB	49	Nate Blanton	Fr
DL	50	DeAndre Dingle-Pince	So
ILB	51	Tyler Bird	Sr
ILB	52	D'Marco Jackson	Sr
DL	55	George Blackstock	Sr
ILB	58	Grant Daley	So
DL	68	Greg Johnston	Jr
DL	90	Dorian Pickett	Jr
DL	91	Tommy Dawkins Jr.	Sr
DL	92	Markell Samuel	Fr
DL	93	Karon White	Fr
DL	94	Stephen Passeggiata	Fr
DL	95	Jamar Rucks	Fr
DL	97	Caleb Spurlin	Sr
DL	99	Jordon Earle	Jr

Special teams

Pos.	#	Name	Class
K	29	John Gliarmis	Jr
P	30	Clayton Howell	Sr
P	39	Xavier Subotsch	Sr
LS	41	Reed Harper	So
LS	42	Christian Johnstone	Jr
K	91	Chandler Staton	Sr

Head coach

- Shawn Clark (Appalachian State)

Coordinators/assistant coaches

- Dale Jones (Tennessee)
  Defensive coordinator/ILB
- Frank Ponce (Florida International)
  Offensive coordinator/QB
- Brian Haines (Marietta College)
  Special teams coordinator/RB
- Justin Watts (Clemson)
  Recruiting coordinator/TE
- Nic Cardwell (Appalachian State)
  Offensive line
- Mark Debastiani (Shepherd)
  Outside linebacker
- David Lockwood (West Virginia)
  Safeties
- Robert Nunn (Oklahoma State)
  Defensive line
- Pat Washington (Auburn)
  Wide receivers
- Rod West (Alabama State)
  Cornerbacks

Legend

- (C) Team captain
- (S) Suspended
- (I) Ineligible
- Injured
- Redshirt

Roster
Last update: April 25, 2021

== Schedule ==
The 2021 schedule had 6 home, 5 away, and one neutral game in the regular season. The Mountaineers traveled to Sun Belt foes Georgia State, Louisiana, Arkansas State, and Troy. The Mountaineers hosted Sun Belt foes Coastal Carolina, Louisiana–Monroe, South Alabama, and Georgia Southern.

Appalachian State hosted two of the four non-conference opponents at Kidd Brewer Stadium, Elon, from NCAA Division I FCS and Marshall of the Conference USA, traveled to Miami (FL) of the ACC, and played a neutral site game against East Carolina of The American at Bank of America Stadium.

Date	Time	Opponent	Site	TV	Result	Attendance
September 2	7:30 p.m.	vs. East Carolina*	Bank of America Stadium; Charlotte, NC (Duke's Mayo Classic)	ESPNU	W 33–19	36,752
September 11	7:00 p.m.	at No. 22 Miami (FL)*	Hard Rock Stadium; Miami, FL	ESPNU	L 23–25	45,877
September 18	3:30 p.m.	Elon*	Kidd Brewer Stadium; Boone, NC	ESPN+	W 44–10	30,224
September 23	7:30 p.m.	Marshall*	Kidd Brewer Stadium; Boone, NC (rivalry)	ESPN	W 31–30	28,377
October 2	2:00 p.m.	at Georgia State	Center Parc Stadium; Atlanta, GA	ESPN+	W 45–16	14,258
October 12	7:30 p.m.	at Louisiana	Cajun Field; Lafayette, LA	ESPN2	L 13–41	20,066
October 20	7:30 p.m.	No. 14 Coastal Carolina	Kidd Brewer Stadium; Boone, NC	ESPN2	W 30–27	31,061
October 30	3:30 p.m.	Louisiana–Monroe^{†}	Kidd Brewer Stadium; Boone, NC	ESPN+	W 59–28	29,321
November 6	2:00 p.m.	at Arkansas State	Centennial Bank Stadium; Jonesboro, AR	ESPN+	W 48–14	9,762
November 13	2:30 p.m.	South Alabama	Kidd Brewer Stadium; Boone, NC	ESPN+	W 31–7	29,348
November 20	3:30 p.m.	at Troy	Veterans Memorial Stadium; Troy, AL	ESPN+	W 45–7	18,523
November 27	2:30 p.m.	Georgia Southern	Kidd Brewer Stadium; Boone, NC (rivalry)	ESPN+	W 27–3	28,005
December 4	3:30 p.m.	at No. 24 Louisiana	Cajun Field; Lafayette, LA (Sun Belt Championship Game)	ESPN	L 16–24	31,014
December 18	11:00 a.m.	vs. Western Kentucky*	FAU Stadium; Boca Raton, FL (Boca Raton Bowl)	ESPN	L 38–59	15,429
*Non-conference game; ^{†}Homecoming; Rankings from AP Poll and CFP Rankings after November 2 released prior to game; All times are in Eastern time

== Game summaries ==
=== Vs. East Carolina ===
East Carolina vs. Appalachian State

Team	1	2	3	4	Total
Pirates	6	0	3	10	19
• RV Mountaineers	14	6	7	6	33

- Date: September 2, 2021
- Location: Bank of America Stadium
  Charlotte, NC
- Game start: 7:33 p.m. EDT
- Elapsed time: 3 hours and 23 minutes
- Game attendance: 36,752
- Game weather: 77 °F (25 °C) • Weather: Clear • Wind: S 8 MPH
- Referee:
- TV announcers (ESPNU): Mike Couzens (play-by-play) and Dustin Fox (analyst)

Scoring summary
1	09:26	ECU	Keaton Mitchell 63-yard pass from Holton Ahlers (Owen Daffer PAT failed) (5 plays, 80 yards, 3:02)	ECU 6–0
1	06:24	APP	Thomas Hennigan 34-yard pass from Chase Brice (Chandler Staton kick) (7 plays, 66 yards, 3:02)	APP 7–6
1	00:50	APP	Camerun Peoples 21-yard rush (Chandler Staton kick) (9 plays, 78 yards, 4:27)	APP 14–6
2	09:13	APP	Chandler Staton 21-yard field goal (11 plays, 80 yards, 4:11)	APP 17–6
2	02:29	APP	Chandler Staton 43-yard field goal (11 plays, 51 yards, 5:06)	APP 20–6
3	08:53	ECU	Owen Daffer 38-yard field goal (10 plays, 66 yards, 4:03)	APP 20–9
3	08:19	APP	Corey Sutton 18-yard pass from Chase Brice (Chandler Staton kick) (2 plays, 86 yards, 0:34)	APP 27–9
4	12:19	APP	Camerun Peoples 12-yard rush (two-point conversion rush attempt failed) (3 plays, 60 yards, 1:29)	APP 33–9
4	06:25	ECU	Owen Daffer 39-yard field goal (11 plays, 59 yards, 4:50)	APP 33–12
4	02:10	ECU	Ryan Jones 38-yard pass from Holton Ahlers (Owen Daffer kick) (6 plays, 76 yards, 1:54)	APP 33–19

Statistics	East Carolina	Appalachian State
First downs	20	25
Total yards	381	485
Rushing yards	86	226
Passing yards	295	259
Turnovers	2	1
Time of possession	28:05	31:55

Team	Category	Player	Statistics
East Carolina	Passing	Holton Ahlers	22/40, 295 yards, 2 TD, INT
East Carolina	Rushing	Keaton Mitchell	4 rushes, 50 yards
East Carolina	Receiving	Keaton Mitchell	5 receptions, 79 yards, TD
Appalachian State	Passing	Chase Brice	20/27, 259 yards, 2 TD, INT
Appalachian State	Rushing	Nate Noel	15 rushes, 126 yards
Appalachian State	Receiving	Thomas Hennigan	4 receptions, 114 yards, TD

=== At Miami (FL) ===
Appalachian State at Miami

Team	1	2	3	4	Total
Mountaineers	7	7	3	6	23
• No. 22 Hurricanes	9	3	7	6	25

- Date: September 11, 2021
- Location: Hard Rock Stadium
  Miami Gardens, FL
- Game start: 7:02 p.m. EDT
- Elapsed time: 3 hours and 33 minutes
- Game attendance: 45,877
- Game weather: 87 °F (31 °C) • Weather: Sunny
- Referee: Kyle Olson
- TV announcers (ESPNU): Clay Matvick (play-by-play), Rocky Boiman (analyst) and Tiffany Blackmon (sideline)

Scoring summary
1	09:09	MIA	Donald Chaney Jr. 1-yard rush (Andres Borregales kick) (3 plays, 6 yards, 0:49)	MIA 7–0
1	05:20	APP	Camerun Peoples 28-yard rush (Chandler Staton kick) (9 plays, 69 yards, 3:49)	TIE 7–7
1	00:53	MIA	Team Safety (7 plays, -9 yards, 2:50)	MIA 9–7
2	06:19	MIA	Andres Borregales 27-yard field goal (12 plays, 76 yards, 4:12)	MIA 12–7
2	06:07	APP	Jalen Virgil 100-yard kickoff returned (Chandler Staton kick) (0 plays, 0 yards, 0:13)	APP 14–12
3	13:32	MIA	Cam'Ron Harris 12-yard rush (Andres Borregales kick) (6 plays, 75 yards, 1:28)	MIA 19–14
3	09:21	APP	Chandler Staton 22-yard field goal (11 plays, 70 yards, 4:11)	MIA 19–14
4	09:15	MIA	Andres Borregales 38-yard field goal (5 plays, 12 yards, 2:05)	MIA 22–17
4	05:48	APP	Malik Williams 3-yard pass from Chase Brice (two-point conversion rush failed) (8 plays, 75 yards, 3:27)	APP 23–22
4	02:04	MIA	Andres Borregales 43-yard field goal (10 plays, 55 yards, 3:44)	MIA 25–23

Statistics	Appalachian State	Miami
First downs	19	25
Total yards	326	375
Rushing yards	127	175
Passing yards	199	200
Turnovers	1	0
Time of possession	32:29	27:31

Team	Category	Player	Statistics
Appalachian State	Passing	Chase Brice	21/34, 199 yards, TD, INT
Appalachian State	Rushing	Camerun Peoples	17 rushes, 95 yards, TD
Appalachian State	Receiving	Corey Sutton	7 receptions, 60 yards
Miami	Passing	D'Eriq King	20/33, 200 yards
Miami	Rushing	Cam'Ron Harris	18 rushes, 91 yards, TD
Miami	Receiving	Key'Shawn Smith	4 receptions, 70 yards

=== Elon ===
Elon at Appalachian State

Team	1	2	3	4	Total
Phoenix	3	0	7	0	10
• Mountaineers	7	6	14	17	44

- Date: September 18, 2021
- Location: Kidd Brewer Stadium
  Boone, NC
- Game start: 3:35 p.m. EDT
- Elapsed time: 3 hours and 12 minutes
- Game attendance: 30,224
- Game weather: 72 °F (22 °C) • Weather: Sunny • Wind: E 2 MPH
- Referee: Marshall Lewis
- TV announcers (ESPN+): David Jackson (play–by–play) and Avery Hall (analyst)

Scoring summary
1	05:24	APP	Malik Williams 47-yard pass from Chase Brice (Chandler Staton kick) (4 plays, 85 yards, 1:36)	APP 7–0
1	01:23	ELON	Skyler Davis 46-yard field goal (8 plays, 46 yards, 4:01)	APP 7–3
2	12:41	APP	Chandler Staton 44-yard field goal (10 plays, 48 yards, 3:42)	APP 10–3
2	00:01	APP	Chandler Staton 45-yard field goal (8 plays, 62 yards, 1:34)	APP 13–3
3	08:29	APP	Chase Brice 1-yard rush (Chandler Staton kick) (7 plays, 55 yards, 3:08)	APP 20–3
3	05:58	APP	Camerun Peoples 1-yard rush (Chandler Staton kick) (2 plays, 5 yards, 0:39)	APP 27–3
3	00:47	ELON	McKinley Witherspoon 2-yard rush (Skyler Davis kick) (6 plays, 37 yards, 2:38)	APP 27–10
4	10:35	APP	Camerun Peoples 18-yard rush (Chandler Staton kick) (3 plays, 50 yards, 1:06)	APP 34–10
4	04:19	APP	Chandler Staton 28-yard field goal (10 plays, 56 yards, 4:07)	APP 37–10
4	00:39	APP	Anderson Castle 8-yard rush (Chandler Staton kick) (4 plays, 30 yards, 2:03)	APP 44–10

Statistics	Elon	Appalachian State
First downs	14	24
Total yards	291	528
Rushing yards	66	187
Passing yards	225	341
Turnovers	2	2
Time of possession	32:53	27:07

Team	Category	Player	Statistics
Elon	Passing	Davis Cheek	22/36, 225 yards, INT
Elon	Rushing	Jaylan Thomas	7 rushes, 39 yards
Elon	Receiving	Jackson Parham	5 receptions, 83 yards
Appalachian State	Passing	Chase Brice	19/25, 293 yards, TD
Appalachian State	Rushing	Camerun Peoples	11 rushes, 80 yards, 2 TD
Appalachian State	Receiving	Corey Sutton	7 receptions, 128 yards

=== Marshall ===
Marshall at Appalachian State

Team	1	2	3	4	Total
Thundering Herd	6	14	10	0	30
• Mountaineers	7	14	0	10	31

- Date: September 23, 2021
- Location: Kidd Brewer Stadium
  Boone, NC
- Game start: 7:35 p.m. EDT
- Elapsed time: 3 hours and 40 minutes
- Game attendance: 28,377
- Game weather: 53 °F (12 °C) • Weather: Sunny • Wind: NW 3 MPH
- Referee: Kevin Vicknair
- TV announcers (ESPN): Matt Barrie (play–by–play), Roddy Jones (analyst), and Harry Lyles Jr. (sideline reporter)

Scoring summary
1	09:38	APP	Camerun Peoples 1-yard rush (Chandler Staton kick) (9 plays, 80 yards, 4:08)	APP 7–0
1	05:36	MRSH	Shane Ciucci 22-yard field goal (11 plays, 71 yards, 4:02)	APP 7–3
1	0:39	MRSH	Shane Ciucci 33-yard field goal (11 plays, 66 yards, 3:11)	APP 7–6
2	12:36	MRSH	Xavier Gaines 56-yard pass from Grant Wells (Shane Ciucci kick) (5 plays, 85 yards, 1:36)	MRSH 13–7
2	07:13	APP	Camerun Peoples 2-yard rush (Chandler Staton kick) (15 plays, 75 yards, 5:23)	APP 14–13
2	07:01	MRSH	Rasheen Ali 97-yard kickoff returned (Shane Ciucci kick) (0 plays, 0 yards, 0:12)	MRSH 20–14
2	0:04	APP	Camerun Peoples 2-yard rush (Chandler Staton kick) (8 plays, 72 yards, 1:54)	APP 21–20
3	07:54	MRSH	Shane Ciucci 46-yard field goal (6 plays, 46 yards, 2:03)	MRSH 23–21
3	04:16	MRSH	Rasheen Ali 8-yard rush (Shane Ciucci kick) (4 plays, 47 yards, 1:15)	MRSH 30–21
4	14:09	APP	Corey Sutton 24-yard pass from Chase Brice (Chandler Staton kick) (6 plays, 91 yards, 1:41)	MRSH 30–28
4	05:45	APP	Chandler Staton 45-yard field goal (10 plays, 52 yards, 4:32)	APP 31–30

Statistics	Marshall	Appalachian State
First downs	20	39
Total yards	397	566
Rushing yards	127	283
Passing yards	270	283
Turnovers	0	2
Time of possession	26:38	33:22

Team	Category	Player	Statistics
Marshall	Passing	Grant Wells	18/33, 270 yards, TD
Marshall	Rushing	Rasheen Ali	17 rushes, 83 yards, TD
Marshall	Receiving	Xavier Gaines	5 receptions, 104 yards, TD
Appalachian State	Passing	Chase Brice	24/39, 283 yards, TD, NT
Appalachian State	Rushing	Nate Noel	20 rushes, 187 yards
Appalachian State	Receiving	Corey Sutton	10 receptions, 127 yards, TD

=== At Georgia State ===
Appalachian State at Georgia State

Team	1	2	3	4	Total
• RV Mountaineers	7	7	17	14	45
Panthers	0	6	3	7	16

- Date: October 2, 2021
- Location: Center Parc Stadium
  Atlanta, GA
- Game start: 2:04 pm EDT
- Elapsed time: 3 hours and 13 minutes
- Game attendance: 14,258
- Game weather: 79 °F (26 °C) • Weather: Cloudy • Wind: SE 3 MPH
- Referee: Trennis Livingston
- TV announcers (ESPN+): Matt Stewart (play–by–play) and Sam Crenshaw (analyst)

Scoring summary
1	12:20	APP	Nate Noel 23-yard rush (Chandler Staton kick) (8 plays, 59 yards, 2:30)	APP 7–0
2	13:14	GSU	Noel Ruiz 23-yard field goal (12 plays, 54 yards, 4:33)	APP 7–3
2	06:08	APP	Malik Williams 33-yard pass from Chase Brice (Chandler Staton kick) (12 plays, 87 yards, 4:27)	APP 14–3
2	01:55	GSU	Noel Ruiz 32-yard field goal (11 plays, 61 yards, 4:13)	APP 14–6
3	08:22	GSU	Noel Ruiz 22-yard field goal (11 plays, 84 yards, 4:06)	APP 14–9
3	08:05	APP	Corey Sutton 79-yard pass from Chase Brice (Chandler Staton kick) (1 play, 79 yards, 0:17)	APP 21–9
3	05:44	APP	Chandler Staton 48-yard field goal (5 plays, 17 yards, 1:13)	APP 24–9
3	00:00	APP	Miller Gibbs 5-yard pass from Jacob Huesman (Chandler Staton kick) (10 plays, 75 yards, 3:56)	APP 31–9
4	13:23	APP	Christian Wells 80-yard from Chase Brice (Chandler Staton kick) (1 play, 80 yards, 0:12)	APP 38–9
4	10:51	APP	Anderson Castle 22-yard rush (Chandler Staton kick) (3 plays, 34 yards, 1:20)	APP 45–9
4	03:44	GSU	Tailique Williams 66-yard pass from Darren Grainger (Noel Ruiz kick) (8 plays, 99 yards, 3:40)	APP 45–16

Statistics	Appalachian State	Georgia State
First downs	23	21
Total yards	502	381
Rushing yards	163	135
Passing yards	339	246
Turnovers	1	3
Time of possession	31:32	28:28

Team	Category	Player	Statistics
Appalachian State	Passing	Chase Brice	20/28, 326 yards, 3 TD
Appalachian State	Rushing	Nate Noel	12 rushes, 74 yards, TD
Appalachian State	Receiving	Corey Sutton	4 receptions, 106 yards, TD
Georgia State	Passing	Cornelious Brown IV	16/31, 171 yards, 2 INT
Georgia State	Rushing	Marcus Carroll	9 rushes, 46 yards
Georgia State	Receiving	Tailique Williams	1 reception, 66 yards, TD

=== At Louisiana ===
Appalachian State at Louisiana

Team	1	2	3	4	Total
RV Mountaineers	3	3	7	0	13
• Ragin' Cajuns	20	0	7	14	41

- Date: October 12, 2021
- Location: Cajun Field
  Lafayette, LA
- Game start: 8:35 p.m. EDT
- Elapsed time: 3 hours and 19 minutes
- Game attendance: 20,066
- Game weather: 84 °F (29 °C) • Weather: Sunny • Wind: S 9 MPH
- Referee: Jeremy Parker
- TV announcers (ESPN2): Chris Cotter (play-by-play) and Cole Cubelic (analyst)

Scoring summary
1	10:45	LA	Levi Lewis 3-yard rush (Nate Snyder kick) (8 plays, 75 yards, 4:15)	LA 7–0
1	05:58	APP	Chandler Staton 31-yard field goal (10 plays, 62 yards, 4:47)	LA 7–3
1	03:32	LA	Kyren Lacy 2-yard pass from Levi Lewis (Nate Snyder kick) (6 plays, 87 yards, 2:36)	LA 14–3
1	00:13	LA	Chris Smith 1-yard rush *(Nate Snyder PAT failed) (4 plays, 31 yards, 2:12)	LA 20–3
2	00:44	APP	Chandler Staton 27-yard field goal (10 plays, 70 yards, 2:51)	LA 20–6
3	13:11	LA	Chris Smith 21-yard rush (Nate Snyder kick) (2 plays, 19 yards, 0:46)	LA 27–6
3	08:19	APP	Chase Brice 5-yard rush (Chandler Staton kick) (12 plays, 51 yards, 4:52)	LA 27–13
4	10:38	LA	Montrell Johnson 2-yard rush (Nate Snyder kick) (13 plays, 98 yards, 7:54)	LA 34–13
4	08:16	LA	Emani Bailey 26-yard rush (Nate Snyder kick) (4 plays, 39 yards, 2:11)	LA 41–13

Statistics	Appalachian State	Louisiana
First downs	15	23
Total yards	211	455
Rushing yards	78	246
Passing yards	133	209
Turnovers	4	1
Time of possession	23:28	36:32

Team	Category	Player	Statistics
Appalachian State	Passing	Chase Brice	15/26, 133 yards, 2 INT
Appalachian State	Rushing	Nate Noel	17 rushes, 44 yards
Appalachian State	Receiving	Malik Williams	6 receptions, 38 yards
Louisiana	Passing	Levi Lewis	15/25, 209 yards, TD, INT
Louisiana	Rushing	Montrell Johnson	14 rushes, 103 yards, TD
Louisiana	Receiving	Kyren Lacy	2 receptions, 57 yards, TD

=== Coastal Carolina ===
Coastal Carolina at Appalachian State

Team	1	2	3	4	Total
No. 14 Chanticleers	14	6	7	0	27
• RV Mountaineers	0	14	13	3	30

- Date: October 20, 2021
- Location: Kidd Brewer Stadium
  Boone, NC
- Game start: 7:35 p.m. EDT
- Elapsed time: 3 hours and 24 minutes
- Game attendance: 31,061
- Game weather: 55 °F (13 °C) • Weather: Sunny • Wind: SW 4 MPH
- Referee: Wayne Winkler
- TV announcers (ESPN2): Anish Shroff (play–by–play), Tom Luginbill (analyst), and Tiffany Blackmon (sideline reporter)

Scoring summary
1	6:46	CCU	Shermari Jones 1-yard run (Massimo Biscardi kick); 10 plays, 72 yards, 4:49)	CCU 7–0
1	1:11	CCU	Kameron Brown 1-yard pass from Grayson McCall (Massimo Biscardi kick) (3 plays, 81 yards, 1:38)	CCU 14–0
2	14:02	APP	Camerun Peoples 1-yard run (Chandler Staton kick) (6 plays, 79 yards, 2:09)	CCU 14–7
2	13:20	APP	Malik Williams 47-yard pass from Chase Brice (Chandler Staton kick) (3 plays, 48 yards, 0:42)	TIE 14–14
2	2:23	CCU	Massimo Biscardi 50-yard field goal (6 plays, 19 yards, 2:59)	CCU 17–14
2	0:00	CCU	Massimo Biscardi 46-yard field goal (2 plays, 0 yards, 0:11)	CCU 20–14
3	9:39	APP	Corey Sutton 28-yard pass from Chase Brice (Chandler Staton kick) (5 plays, 75 yards, 2:14)	APP 21–20
3	4:36	CCU	Shermari Jones 1-yard run (Massimo Biscardi kick) (9 plays, 83 yards, 5:03)	CCU 27–21
3	1:43	APP	Camerun Peoples 43-yard run (two-point conversion failed) (6 plays, 77 yards, 2:53)	TIE 27–27
4	0:00	APP	Chandler Staton 24-yard field goal (9 plays, 55 yards, 3:53)	APP 30–27

Statistics	Coastal Carolina	Appalachian State
First downs	17	22
Total yards	346	575
Rushing yards	55	228
Passing yards	291	347
Turnovers	0	2
Time of possession	29:32	30:28

Team	Category	Player	Statistics
Coastal Carolina	Passing	Grayson McCall	15/23, 291 yards, TD
Coastal Carolina	Rushing	Reese White	9 rushes, 33 yards
Coastal Carolina	Receiving	Jaivon Heiligh	6 receptions, 103 yards
Appalachian State	Passing	Chase Brice	18/28, 347 yards, 2 TD
Appalachian State	Rushing	Nate Noel	16 rushes, 82 yards
Appalachian State	Receiving	Malik Williams	10 receptions, 206 yards, TD

=== Louisiana–Monroe ===
Louisiana–Monroe at Appalachian State

Team	1	2	3	4	Total
Warhawks	0	7	14	7	28
• RV Mountaineers	21	28	3	7	59

- Date: October 30, 2021
- Location: Kidd Brewer Stadium
  Boone, NC
- Game start: 3:35 p.m. EDT
- Elapsed time: 3 hours and 4 minutes
- Game attendance: 29,321
- Game weather: 48 °F (9 °C) • Weather: Cloudy • Wind: NW 5 MPH
- Referee: Kyle Olson
- TV announcers (ESPN+): David Jackson (play–by–play) and Avery Hall (analyst)

Scoring summary
1	07:08	APP	Camerun Peoples 3-yard rush (Chandler Staton kick) (8 plays, 72 yards, 3:30)	APP 7–0
1	04:26	APP	Malik Williams 16-yard pass from Chase Brice (Chandler Staton kick) (5 plays, 28 yards, 2:36)	APP 14–0
1	02:08	APP	Caleb Spurlin 1-yard pass from Chase Brice (Chandler Staton kick) (6 plays, 45 yards, 2:07)	APP 21–0
2	10:27	APP	Camerun Peoples 26-yard rush (Chandler Staton kick) (10 plays, 73 yards, 3:17)	APP 28–0
2	07:11	APP	Caleb Spurlin 1-yard pass from Chase Brice (Chandler Staton kick) (5 plays, 69 yards, 2:14)	APP 35–0
2	04:01	ULM	Jiya Wright 3-yard rush (Calum Sutherland kick) (4 plays, 42 yards, 0:54)	APP 35–7
2	00:39	APP	Corey Sutton 14-yard pass from Chase Brice (Chandler Staton kick) (5 plays, 27 yards, 1:49)	APP 42–7
2	00:00	APP	Steven Jones Jr. 14-yard interception returned (Chandler Staton kick) (2 plays, -2 yards, 0:34)	APP 49–7
3	10:35	ULM	Dariyan Wiley 13-yard pass from Jiya Wright (Calum Sutherland kick) (10 plays, 75 yards, 4:25)	APP 49–14
3	08:05	APP	Chandler Staton 31-yard field goal (7 plays, 61 yards, 2:30)	APP 52–14
3	00:26	ULM	Abraham Alce 2-yard rush (Calum Sutherland kick) (16 plays, 75 yards, 7:39)	APP 52–21
4	10:22	APP	Nate Noel 7-yard rush (Chandler Staton kick) (3 plays, 50 yards, 1:09)	APP 59–21
4	09:58	ULM	Jakyle Holmes 68-yard rush (Calum Sutherland kick) (1 play, 86 yards, 0:17)	APP 59–28

Statistics	Louisiana–Monroe	Appalachian State
First downs	17	25
Total yards	391	521
Rushing yards	230	251
Passing yards	161	270
Turnovers	5	0
Time of possession	30:06	29:54

Team	Category	Player	Statistics
Louisiana–Monroe	Passing	Jiya Wright	9/17, 158 yards, 1 TD, 2 INTs
Louisiana–Monroe	Rushing	Jiya Wright	20 carries, 91 yards, 1 TD
Louisiana–Monroe	Receiving	Jevin Frett	1 reception, 40 yards
Appalachian State	Passing	Chase Brice	20/30, 256 yards, 4 TDs
Appalachian State	Rushing	Nate Noel	17 carries, 132 yards, 1 TD
Appalachian State	Receiving	Corey Sutton	5 receptions, 77 yards, 1 TD

=== At Arkansas State ===
Appalachian State at Arkansas State

Team	1	2	3	4	Total
• Mountaineers	14	10	14	10	48
Red Wolves	0	14	0	0	14

- Date: November 6, 2021
- Location: Centennial Bank Stadium
  Jonesboro, AR
- Game start: 2:05 p.m. EDT
- Elapsed time: 4 hours and 9 minutes
- Game attendance: 9,762
- Game weather: 60 °F (16 °C) • Weather: Sunny • Wind: NW 2 MPH
- Referee: David Smith
- TV announcers (ESPN+): Brad Bobo (play–by–play), Pete Cordelli (analyst), Cori Keller (sideline reporter)

Scoring summary
1	08:15	APP	Thomas Hennigan 34-yard pass from Malik Williams (Chandler Staton kick) (10 plays, 79 yards, 4:44)	APP 7–0
1	07:22	APP	Steven Jones Jr. 47-yard interception returned (Chandler Staton kick) (3 plays, 8 yards, 0:47)	APP 14–0
2	14:18	ARST	Emmanuel Stevenson 7-yard pass from Layne Hatcher (Blake Grupe kick) (9 plays, 55 yards, 3:08)	APP 14–7
2	10:18	ARST	Ross Painter 20-yard pass from Layne Hatcher (Blake Grupe kick) (5 plays, 33 yards, 1:29)	TIE 14–14
2	07:02	APP	Nate Noel 18-yard rush (Chandler Staton kick) (8 plays, 60 yards, 3:08)	APP 21–14
2	00:03	APP	Chandler Staton 33-yard field goal (12 plays, 57 yards, 5:20)	APP 28–14
3	07:12	APP	Miller Gibbs 10-yard pass from Chase Brice (Chandler Staton kick) (12 plays, 72 yards, 5:00)	APP 31–14
3	02:59	APP	Camerun Peoples 27-yard rush (Chandler Staton kick) (6 plays, 48 yards, 2:15)	APP 38–14
4	05:16	APP	Chandler Staton 22-yard field goal (15 plays, 92 yards, 8:49)	APP 41–14
4	04:01	APP	Steven Jones Jr. 34-yard interception returned (Chandler Staton kick) (3 plays, 1 yards, 1:07)	APP 48–14

Statistics	Appalachian State	Arkansas State
First downs	28	13
Total yards	461	199
Rushing yards	264	62
Passing yards	197	137
Turnovers	1	3
Time of possession	35:33	24:27

Team	Category	Player	Statistics
Appalachian State	Passing	Chase Brice	15/26, 163 yards, 1 TD, 1 INT
Appalachian State	Rushing	Nate Noel	23 carries, 122 yards, 1 TD
Appalachian State	Receiving	Thomas Hennigan	4 receptions, 69 yards, 1 TD
Arkansas State	Passing	Layne Hatcher	17/30, 137 yards, 2 TDs, 3 INTs
Arkansas State	Rushing	Johnnie Lang Jr.	6 carries, 43 yards
Arkansas State	Receiving	Te'Vailance Hunt	3 receptions, 35 yards

=== South Alabama ===
South Alabama at Appalachian State

Team	1	2	3	4	Total
Jaguars	0	7	0	0	7
• Mountaineers	14	0	3	14	31

- Date: November 13, 2021
- Location: Kidd Brewer Stadium
  Boone, NC
- Game start: 2:35 p.m. EST
- Elapsed time: 3 hours and 6 minutes
- Game attendance: 20,348
- Game weather: 39 °F (4 °C) • Weather: Sunny • Wind: NW 16 MPH
- Referee: Wayne Winkler
- TV announcers (ESPN+): David Jackson (play–by–play) and Avery Hall (analyst)

Scoring summary
1	02:39	APP	Chase Brice 6-yard rush (Chandler Staton kick) (10 plays, 85 yards, 5:09)	APP 7–0
1	01:43	APP	Corey Sutton 17-yard pass from Chase Brice (Chandler Staton kick) (2 plays, 21 yards, 0:40)	APP 14–0
2	03:50	USA	Jacob Hopper 27-yard pass from Desmond Trotter (Diego Guajardo kick) (1 play, 27 yards, 0:09)	APP 14–7
3	02:18	APP	Chandler Staton 25-yard field goal (12 plays, 88 yards, 5:02)	APP 17–7
4	08:23	APP	Thomas Hennigan 14-yard pass from Chase Brice (Chandler Staton kick) (9 plays, 51 yards, 4:07)	APP 24–7
4	02:37	APP	Trey Cobb 100-yard interception returned (Chandler Staton kick) (8 plays, 82 yards, 2:56)	APP 31–7

Statistics	South Alabama	Appalachian State
First downs	17	17
Total yards	284	330
Rushing yards	58	135
Passing yards	226	195
Turnovers	2	4
Time of possession	30:05	29:55

Team	Category	Player	Statistics
South Alabama	Passing	Desmond Trotter	21/38, 226 yards, 1 TD, 2 INTs
South Alabama	Rushing	Terrion Avery	11 carries, 24 yards
South Alabama	Receiving	Jalen Tolbert	7 receptions, 108 yards
Appalachian State	Passing	Chase Brice	14/26, 195 yards, 2 TDs, 2 INTs
Appalachian State	Rushing	Camerun Peoples	23 carries, 90 yards
Appalachian State	Receiving	Jalen Virgil	2 receptions, 57 yards

=== At Troy ===
Appalachian State at Troy

Team	1	2	3	4	Total
• Mountaineers	3	7	21	14	45
Trojans	7	0	0	0	7

- Date: November 20, 2021
- Location: Kidd Brewer Stadium
  Boone, NC
- Game start: 3:35 p.m. EST
- Elapsed time: 3 hours
- Game attendance: 18,523
- Game weather: 67 °F (19 °C) • Weather: Sunny • Wind: W 10 MPH
- Referee: Marshall Lewis
- TV announcers (ESPN+): Will Kollmeyer (play–by–play) and Ben Stanfield (analyst)

Scoring summary
1	07:36	APP	Chandler Staton 24-yard field goal (12 plays, 81 yards, 5:52)	APP 3–0
1	06:15	TROY	Deshon Stoudemire 37-yard pass from Gunnar Watson (Brooks Buce kick) (4 plays, 75 yards, 1:21)	TROY 7–3
2	00:21	APP	Corey Sutton 21-yard pass from Chase Brice (Chandler Staton kick) (6 plays, 61 yards, 1:00)	APP 10–3
3	12:14	APP	Thomas Hennigan 6-yard pass from Chase Brice (Chandler Staton kick) (6 plays, 64 yards, 2:46)	APP 17–7
3	12:00	APP	Eli Wilson 10-yard pass from Chase Brice (Chandler Staton kick) (1 play, 10 yards, 0:08)	APP 24–7
3	05:08	APP	Nate Noel 5-yard rush (Chandler Staton kick) (8 plays, 45 yards, 3:57)	APP 31–7
4	14:13	APP	Daetrich Harrington 2-yard rush (Chandler Staton kick) (9 plays, 58 yards, 4:53)	APP 38–7
4	05:06	APP	Jahmir Smith 1-yard rush (Chandler Staton kick) (11 plays, 32 yards, 7:46)	APP 45–7

Statistics	Appalachian State	Troy
First downs	26	6
Total yards	445	142
Rushing yards	233	33
Passing yards	212	109
Turnovers	2	2
Time of possession	43:17	16:43

Team	Category	Player	Statistics
Appalachian State	Passing	Chase Brice	17/24, 212 yards, 3 TDs, 2 INTs
Appalachian State	Rushing	Nate Noel	15 carries, 102 yards, 1 TD
Appalachian State	Receiving	Thomas Hennigan	7 receptions, 85 yards, 1 TD
Troy	Passing	Gunnar Watson	11/21, 109 yards, 1 TD, 1 INT
Troy	Rushing	Kimani Vidal	10 carries, 40 yards
Troy	Receiving	Tez Johnson	4 receptions, 44 yards

=== Georgia Southern ===
Georgia Southern at Appalachian State

Team	1	2	3	4	Total
Eagles	0	0	3	0	3
• Mountaineers	7	0	10	10	27

- Date: November 27, 2021
- Location: Kidd Brewer Stadium
  Boone, NC
- Game start: 2:35 p.m. EST
- Elapsed time: 2 hours and 55 minutes
- Game attendance: 28,005
- Game weather: 48 °F (9 °C) • Weather: Sunny • Wind: W 9 MPH
- Referee: Kyle Olson
- TV announcers (ESPN+): David Jackson (play–by–play) and Avery Hall (analyst)

Scoring summary
1	02:18	APP	Malik Williams 36-yard pass from Chase Brice (Chandler Staton kick) (8 plays, 80 yards, 3:06)	APP 7–0
3	05:19	APP	Chandler Staton 40-yard field goal (4 plays, 0 yards, 1:12)	APP 10–0
3	00:53	GASO	Britton Williams 38-yard field goal (11 plays, 69 yards, 4:20)	APP 10–3
3	00:40	APP	Jalen Virgil 97-yard kickoff returned (Chandler Staton kick) (3 plays, -4 yards, 1:40)	APP 17–3
4	13:50	APP	Thomas Hennigan 68-yard pass from Chase Brice (Chandler Staton kick) (1 play, 68 yards, 0:10)	APP 24–3
4	06:27	APP	Chandler Staton 36-yard field goal (6 plays, 22 yards, 2:26)	APP 27–3

Statistics	Georgia Southern	Appalachian State
First downs	15	12
Total yards	194	329
Rushing yards	87	94
Passing yards	107	235
Turnovers	1	1
Time of possession	34:35	25:25

Team	Category	Player	Statistics
Georgia Southern	Passing	Connor Cigelske	11/24, 107 yards
Georgia Southern	Rushing	Jalen White	8 carries, 38 yards
Georgia Southern	Receiving	Amare Jones	5 receptions, 56 yards
Appalachian State	Passing	Chase Brice	12/24, 235 yards, 2 TDs
Appalachian State	Rushing	Anderson Castle	6 carries, 31 yards
Appalachian State	Receiving	Thomas Hennigan	3 receptions, 111 yards, 1 TD

=== At Louisiana (SBC Championship) ===
Appalachian State at Louisiana

Team	1	2	3	4	Total
Mountaineers	0	7	3	6	16
• No. 24 Ragin' Cajuns	7	10	0	7	24

- Date: December 4, 2021
- Location: Cajun Field
  Lafayette, LA
- Game start: 3:40 p.m. EST
- Elapsed time: 3 hours and 45 minutes
- Game attendance: 31,014
- Game weather: 79 °F (26 °C) • Weather: Sunny • Wind: NW 3 MPH
- Referee: Kyle Olson
- TV announcers (ESPN): Dave Pasch (play–by–play), Dusty Dvoracek (analyst), and Tom Luginbill (sideline reporter)

Scoring summary
1	09:55	LA	Michael Jefferson 27-yard pass from Levi Lewis (Nate Snyder kick) (9 plays, 75 yards, 5:05)	LA 7–0
2	09:22	LA	Levi Lewis 56-yard rush (Nate Snyder kick) (7 plays, 92 yards, 1:56)	LA 14–0
2	02:38	APP	Camerun Peoples 43-yard rush (Chandler Staton kick) (6 plays, 75 yards, 2:39)	LA 14–7
2	00:01	LA	Nate Snyder 33-yard field goal (5 plays, 38 yards, 0:31)	LA 17–7
3	08:06	APP	Chandler Staton 36-yard field goal (15 plays, 57 yards, 6:54)	LA 17–10
4	12:14	LA	Emani Bailey 35-yard rush (Nate Snyder kick) (7 plays, 72 yards, 2:36)	LA 24–10
4	05:06	APP	Thomas Hennigan 24-yard pass from Chase Brice (two-point pass conversion attempt failed) (12 plays, 83 yards, 3:10)	LA 24–16

Statistics	Appalachian State	Louisiana
First downs	18	20
Total yards	290	398
Rushing yards	171	188
Passing yards	119	210
Turnovers	1	0
Time of possession	27:23	32:37

Team	Category	Player	Statistics
Appalachian State	Passing	Chase Brice	12/30, 119 yards, 1 TD
Appalachian State	Rushing	Camerun Peoples	8 carries, 61 yards, 1 TD
Appalachian State	Receiving	Thomas Hennigan	6 receptions, 71 yards, 1 TD
Louisiana	Passing	Levi Lewis	15/30, 210 yards, 1 TD
Louisiana	Rushing	Emani Bailey	14 carries, 114 yards, 1 TD
Louisiana	Receiving	Peter LeBlanc	4 receptions, 67 yards

=== Vs. Western Kentucky (Boca Raton Bowl) ===
Western Kentucky vs. Appalachian State

Team	1	2	3	4	Total
• Hilltoppers	14	17	21	7	59
Mountaineers	14	10	7	7	38

- Date: December 18, 2021
- Location: FAU Stadium
  Boca Raton, FL
- Game start: 11:00 a.m. EST
- Elapsed time: 3 hours and 42 minutes
- Game attendance: 15,429
- Game weather: 81 °F (27 °C) • Weather: Cloudy • Wind: SE 17 MPH
- Referee: Steve Baron
- TV announcers (ESPN): Clay Matvick (play–by–play), Rocky Boiman (analyst), and Tiffany Blackmon (sideline reporter)

Scoring summary
1	13:14	WKU	Jerreth Stearns 1-yard pass from Bailey Zappe (Brayden Narveson kick) (8 plays, 74 yards, 1:46)	WKU 7–0
1	3:25	APP	Malik Williams 36-yard pass from Chase Brice (Chandler Staton kick) (6 plays, 63 yards, 2:58)	Tie 7–7
1	3:11	WKU	Mitchell Tinsley 75-yard pass from Bailey Zappe (Brayden Narveson kick) (1 play, 75 yards, 00:14)	WKU 14–7
1	1:11	APP	Jalen Virgil 60-yard pass from Chase Brice (Chandler Staton kick) (5 plays, 76 yards, 2:00)	Tie 14–14
2	11:48	WKU	Brayden Narveson 24-yard field goal (7 plays, 64 yards, 1:21)	WKU 17–14
2	8:57	APP	Dashaun Davis 33-yard pass from Chase Brice (Chandler Staton kick) (5 plays, 61 yards, 2:51)	ASU 21–17
2	6:54	WKU	Joey Beljan 5-yard pass from Bailey Zappe (Brayden Narveson kick) (8 plays, 75 yards, 2:03)	WKU 24–21
2	2:55	APP	Chandler Staton 28-yard field goal (8 plays, 64 yards, 3:59)	Tie 24–24
2	00:29	WKU	Jerreth Sterns 10-yard pass from Bailey Zappe (Brayden Narveson kick) (8 plays, 78 yards, 2:26)	WKU 31–24
3	12:49	WKU	Noah Wittington 86-yard run (Brayden Narveson kick) (1 play, 86 yards, 00:12)	WKU 38–24
3	5:56	WKU	Mitchell Tinsley 2-yard pass from Bailey Zappe (Brayden Narveson kick) (11 plays, 73 yards, 4:38)	WKU 45–24
3	5:38	APP	Christian Wells 62-yard pass from Chase Brice (Chandler Staton kick) (1 play, 62 yards, 00:18)	WKU 45–31
3	2:42	WKU	Jerreth Sterns 37-yard pass from Bailey Zappe (Brayden Narveson kick) (6 plays, 75 yards, 2:56)	WKU 52–31
4	9:40	WKU	Kye Robichaux 2-yard run (Brayden Narveson kick) (2 plays, 2 yards, 00:09)	WKU 59–31
4	1:55	APP	Anderson Castle 9-yard run (Chandler Staton kick) (7 plays, 69 yards, 2:17)	WKU 59–38

Statistics	Western Kentucky	Appalachian State
First downs	24	27
Total yards	609	637
Rushing yards	251	215
Passing yards	358	422
Turnovers	4	1
Time of possession	31:12	28:48

Team	Category	Player	Statistics
Western Kentucky	Passing	Bailey Zappe	33/47, 422 yards, 6 TD
Western Kentucky	Rushing	Noah Wittington	7 carries, 150 yards, 1 TD
Western Kentucky	Receiving	Jerreth Sterns	13 receptions, 184 yards, 3 TD
Appalachian State	Passing	Chase Brice	15/23, 317 yards, 4 TD, INT
Appalachian State	Rushing	Camerun Peoples	13 carries, 101 yards
Appalachian State	Receiving	Christian Wells	4 receptions, 86 yards, 1 TD
