= Clay County High School =

Clay County High School may refer to:

- Clay County High School (Kentucky), in Clay County, Kentucky
- Clay County High School (Tennessee), in Clay County, Tennessee
- Clay County School District (Alabama), formerly in the Clay County, Alabama, School District
