= Bryan Brown (American football) =

American football player and coach (born 1983)

Current position
- Title: Defensive coordinator
- Team: Ole Miss
- Conference: SEC

Biographical details
- Born: October 25, 1983 (age 43); Corinth, Mississippi, U.S.
- Education: University of Mississippi (2006)

Playing career
- 2003–2006: Ole Miss
- Position: Defensive back

Coaching career (HC unless noted)
- 2008: Rutgers (PD)
- 2009: Delta State (GA)
- 2010: Ole Miss (DAA)
- 2011: Ole Miss (GA)
- 2012–2017: Appalachian State (CB)
- 2018: Appalachian State (DC/CB)
- 2019–2020: Louisville (DC/CB)
- 2021–2022: Louisville (AHC/DC/CB)
- 2023: Cincinnati (AHC/DC)
- 2024–2025: Ole Miss (co-DC/DB)
- 2026–present: Ole Miss (DC)

Bryan Brown (born October 25, 1983) is an American football coach. He is currently the defensive coordinator at Ole Miss. He previously served as defensive coordinator at Cincinnati, as well as Appalachian State and Louisville, under current Cincinnati head coach Scott Satterfield. He has also played at Ole Miss.

== Playing career ==
Brown played as a defensive back at Ole Miss, from 2003 to 2006, amassing two tackles and one interception returned for a touchdown. He also played basketball for the Rebels during the 2002–03 season as a freshman.

== Coaching career ==
=== Early coaching career ===
During his playing career at Ole Miss, Brown helped head coach and defensive coordinator Ed Orgeron with game planning for the cornerbacks. He got his first full–time coaching role as a player development coach at Rutgers under head coach Greg Schiano. He left Rutgers after one season to become a graduate assistant at Delta State. For the 2010 and 2011 seasons, he returned to Ole Miss as a defensive administrative assistant and later as a graduate assistant under head coach Houston Nutt.

=== Appalachian State ===
Before the 2012 season, Brown was hired as the cornerbacks coach at Appalachian State. After entering the FBS in 2014, Appalachian State's cornerback unit recorded 0.8 interceptions per game in 2014, 1.4 in 2015, 1.5 in 2016, and 1.4 in 2017. Appalachian State's secondary recorded 70 interceptions from 2015 to 2018, only trailing San Diego State in the FBS.

In 2018, he was promoted to defensive coordinator following the departure of Nate Woody to Georgia Tech. His 2018 defense ranked #4 overall in the country in points allowed at 15.5 points allowed per game.

=== Louisville ===
After the 2018 season, he followed head coach Scott Satterfield from Appalachian State to Louisville, keeping his role as defensive coordinator. His 2019 defense struggled, allowing 33.4 points per game before improving to 26.6 points allowed per game in 2020.

=== Cincinnati ===
On December 6, 2022, it was reported that Brown would follow Scott Satterfield to Cincinnati as defensive coordinator.

=== Ole Miss ===
It was reported, on January 12, 2024, that Brown was leaving Cincinnati and returning to Ole Miss. Brown was hired as a co-defensive coordinator and would also assume coaching of the safeties.

== Personal life ==
Brown and his wife, Courtney, have a son, Bryson, and a daughter, Elle.
