= Clay County School District (Alabama) =

School district in Alabama, United States

Location
- Clay County, Alabama; United States

District information
- Grades: K–12
- Schools: 2 elementary, 1 junior high, 1 high

Other information
- Website: www.claycoboe.org

Clay County School District is a school district in Clay County, Alabama.

== Schools ==
- Central High School of Clay County (Lineville)
- Central Junior High School (Lineville)
- Lineville Elementary School (Lineville)
- Ashland Elementary School (Ashland)
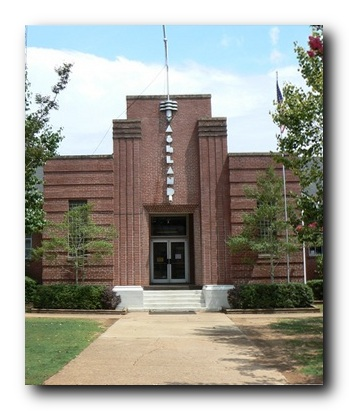
Ashland Elementary School

== Former schools ==
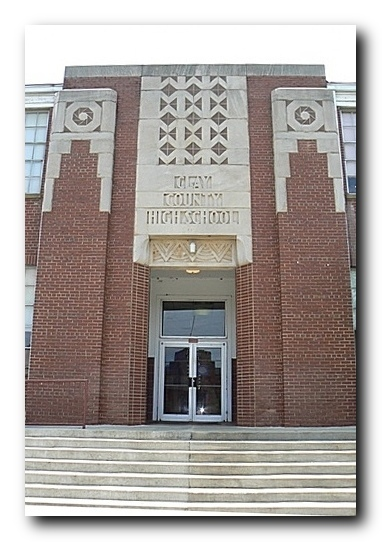
Clay County High School (Now Closed)

Clay County High School closed.
