= Tae Hayes =

American football player (born 1997)

No. 30, 22, 36, 32, 39, 27
- Position: Cornerback

Personal information
- Born: August 19, 1997 (age 29); Decatur, Alabama, U.S.
- Listed height: 5 ft 9 in (1.75 m)
- Listed weight: 190 lb (86 kg)

Career information
- High school: Decatur
- College: Appalachian State
- NFL draft: 2019: undrafted

Career history
- Jacksonville Jaguars (2019); Miami Dolphins (2019–2020); Minnesota Vikings (2020); Arizona Cardinals (2021)*; Carolina Panthers (2021)*; Birmingham Stallions (2022); Carolina Panthers (2022); New England Patriots (2022); Detroit Lions (2023)*; Baltimore Ravens (2023)*; New York Jets (2023)
- * Offseason or practice squad member only

Awards and highlights
- USFL champion (2022); Second-team All-Sun Belt (2017)

Career NFL statistics
- Total tackles: 18
- Fumble recoveries: 1
- Pass deflections: 2
- Stats at Pro Football Reference

Ke'Montae Tayvon "Tae" Hayes (born August 19, 1997) is an American former professional football player who was a cornerback in the National Football League (NFL). He played college football for the Appalachian State Mountaineers.

== Professional career ==
Pre-draft measurables
Height	Weight	Arm length	Hand span	40-yard dash	10-yard split	20-yard split	20-yard shuttle	Three-cone drill	Vertical jump	Broad jump	Bench press
5 ft 9 1/8 in (1.76 m)	188 lb (85 kg)	29 7/8 in (0.76 m)	9 in (0.23 m)	4.56 s	1.57 s	2.62 s	4.19 s	6.90 s	35.0 in (0.89 m)	10 ft 1 in (3.07 m)	17 reps
All values from Pro Day

=== Jacksonville Jaguars ===
Hayes signed with the Jacksonville Jaguars as an undrafted free agent but was released before the start of the 2019 season. He was later signed to the practice squad before being promoted to the active roster to replace injured wide receiver Marqise Lee. He was waived on December 12, 2019.

=== Miami Dolphins ===
On December 13, 2019, Hayes was claimed off waivers by the Miami Dolphins.

On September 5, 2020, Hayes was waived by the Dolphins and re-signed to the practice squad two days later. He was elevated to the active roster on September 24 and October 31 for the team's Weeks 3 and 8 games against the Jacksonville Jaguars and Los Angeles Rams, and reverted to the practice squad after each game. Hayes was released by the Dolphins on November 23.

=== Minnesota Vikings ===
On December 2, 2020, Hayes signed with the practice squad of the Minnesota Vikings. He was elevated to the active roster on January 2, 2021, for the team's Week 17 game against the Detroit Lions, and reverted to the practice squad after the game. Hayes signed a reserve/future contract with the Vikings on January 4. On March 5, he was waived by the Vikings.

=== Arizona Cardinals ===
On May 17, 2021, Hayes signed with the Arizona Cardinals. He was waived by the Cardinals on August 5.

=== Carolina Panthers (first stint) ===
On December 30, 2021, Hayes was signed to the Carolina Panthers' practice squad.

=== Birmingham Stallions ===
Hayes was selected with second pick of the ninth round of the 2022 USFL draft by the Birmingham Stallions.

=== Carolina Panthers (second stint) ===
On August 4, 2022, Hayes signed with the Carolina Panthers. He was waived on August 30, and re-signed to the team's practice squad the next day. Hayes was promoted to the active roster on October 25. He was waived on December 10 and re-signed to the practice squad. Hayes was released by Carolina on December 20.

=== New England Patriots ===
On December 27, 2022, Hayes was signed to the New England Patriots' practice squad. He was promoted to the active roster four days later. On January 6, 2023, Hayes signed a two-year contract with New England. However, he was waived by the Patriots on February 15. On May 9, Hayes re-signed with the Patriots. He was waived again on June 12.

=== Detroit Lions ===
On August 4, 2023, Hayes signed with the Detroit Lions. He was waived on August 11.

=== Baltimore Ravens ===
On August 13, 2023, Hayes was claimed off waivers by the Baltimore Ravens. He was waived on August 29. Hayes was re-signed to the team's practice squad on September 4. He was released from the practice squad on September 12.

=== New York Jets ===
On October 3, 2023, Hayes was signed to the New York Jets' practice squad. He signed a reserve/future contract with New York on January 8, 2024. Hayes was released by the Jets on June 24.

== Personal life ==
On June 23, 2024, Hayes was arrested in Alabama for marijuana possession. He was released over an hour later after posting a $300 bond.
