= Jay Person =

American gridrion football player (born 2000)

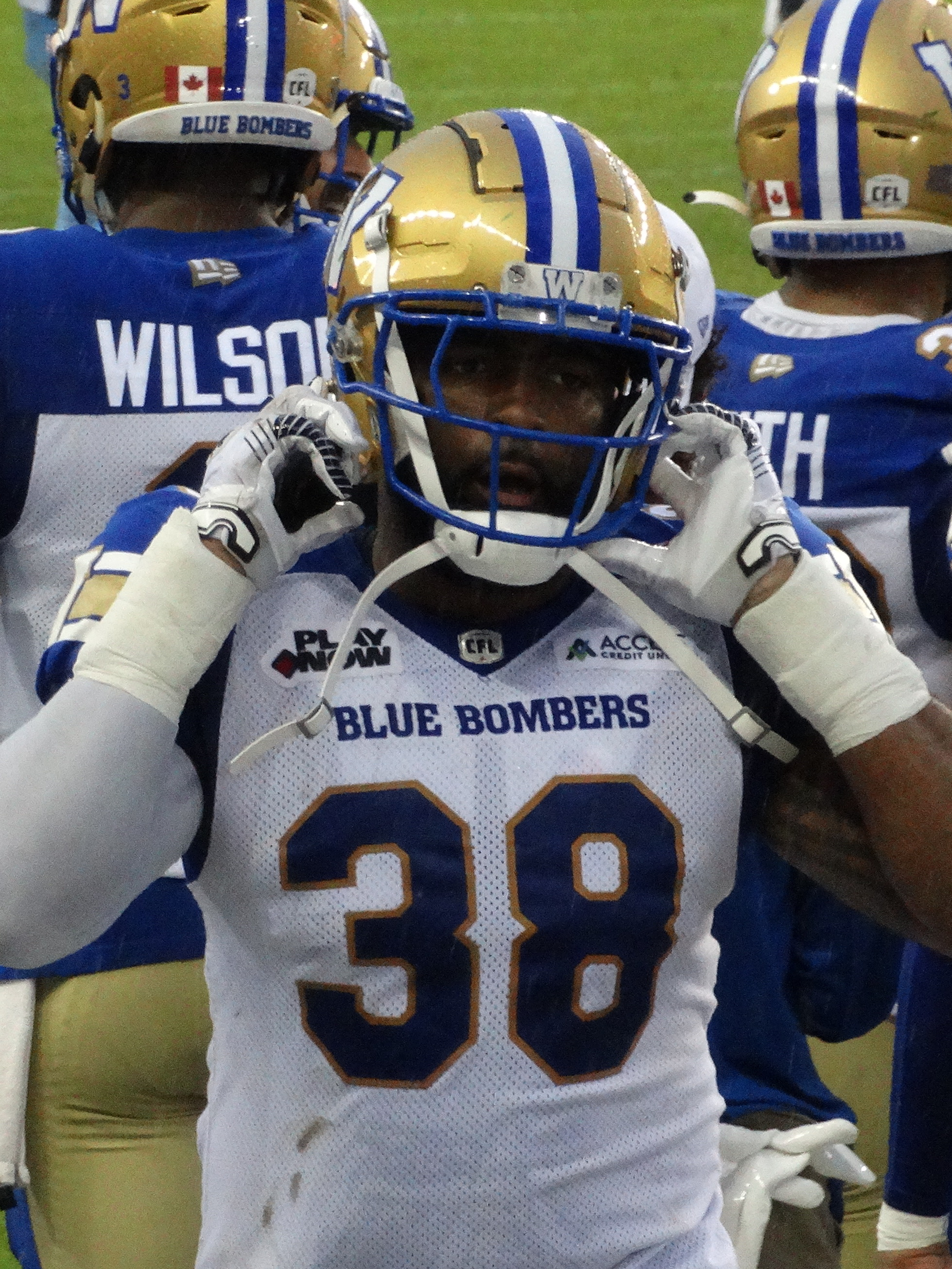
- Person with the Winnipeg Blue Bombers in 2025

No. 50 – Orlando Pirates
- Position: Defensive lineman
- Roster status: Active
- CFL status: American

Personal information
- Born: March 20, 2000 (age 26)
- Listed height: 6 ft 2 in (1.88 m)
- Listed weight: 250 lb (113 kg)

Career information
- High school: Bradley Central (Cleveland, Tennessee)
- College: Appalachian State (2018); Chattanooga (2019–2023)
- NFL draft: 2024: undrafted

Career history
- New England Patriots (2024)*; Toronto Argonauts (2024); Tampa Bay Buccaneers (2024)*; Winnipeg Blue Bombers (2024–2025); Orlando Pirates (2026–present)
- * Offseason or practice squad member only

Awards and highlights
- 2× FCS All-America (2022, 2023); 2× First-team All-SoCon (2022, 2023); 2× Second-team All-SoCon (2020-21, 2021)

Career CFL statistics as of 2025
- Games played: 13
- Tackles: 4
- Sacks: 1
- Stats at CFL.ca

Jay Paul Person (born March 20, 2000) is an American professional football defensive lineman for the Orlando Pirates of the Indoor Football League (IFL). Person played college football for the Appalachian State Mountaineers and the Chattanooga Mocs. He also had stints in the National Football League (NFL) with the New England Patriots and Tampa Bay Buccaneers.

== College career ==
Person played college football for the Appalachian State Mountaineers in 2018 and the Chattanooga Mocs from 2019 to 2023. He started his college career at Appalachian State and played in two games while redshirting, recording two tackles. At Chattanooga he played in 48 games, logging 228 tackles, including 56 tackles for loss, 27 sacks, five pass deflections, nine forced fumbles and three fumble recoveries.

For his efforts in 2022 and 2023, he was the SoCon Defensive Player of The Year. In those same years, Person was twice named to the FCS All-America team. Person was also named as a finalist for the Buck Buchanan Award, finishing T-8 and 12th in 2022 and 2023 respectively.

== Professional career ==
Pre-draft measurables
| Height | Weight | Arm length | Hand span | Vertical jump | Bench press |
|---|---|---|---|---|---|
| 6 ft 2 in (1.88 m) | 237 lb (108 kg) | 32 in (0.81 m) | 8 5/8 in (0.22 m) | 31 in (0.79 m) | 17 reps |
All values from Pro Day

=== New England Patriots ===
After not being selected in the 2024 NFL draft, Person signed with the New England Patriots as an undrafted free agent on May 13, 2024. He was released on June 11.

=== Toronto Argonauts ===
On July 1, Person was signed by the Toronto Argonauts to the practice roster. He was waived by the team on July 25.

=== Tampa Bay Buccaneers ===
On August 1, it was announced that Person was signed by the Tampa Bay Buccaneers. He was released as part of the final roster cuts on August 27.

=== Winnipeg Blue Bombers ===
On September 19, 2024, Person was signed by the Winnipeg Blue Bombers. After not appearing in the final two games of the 2024 season, he was signed to practice roster on June 1, 2025. He made his CFL debut on July 18 against the Calgary Stampeders but did not record any statistics. The following week against the Toronto Argonauts, he recorded two tackles and his first sack against quarterback, Nick Arbuckle. Person finished the season having played in 13 games where he had four defensive tackles, one sack, and one touchdown. He finished the season on the practice roster and his contract expired on November 2.

=== Orlando Pirates ===
On May 7, 2026, Person signed with the Orlando Pirates of the Indoor Football League.
