= Camerun Peoples =

American football player (born 1999)

No. 25
- Position: Running back

Personal information
- Born: September 14, 1999 (age 27); Lineville, Alabama, U.S.
- Listed height: 6 ft 2 in (1.88 m)
- Listed weight: 225 lb (102 kg)

Career information
- High school: Clay Central (Lineville, Alabama)
- College: Appalachian State (2018–2022)
- NFL draft: 2023: undrafted

Career history
- Carolina Panthers (2023)*; Edmonton Elks (2024)*
- * Offseason or practice squad member only

Awards and highlights
- 2× Second-team All-Sun Belt (2020, 2021)
- Stats at Pro Football Reference

Camerun Peoples (born September 14, 1999) is an American former football running back. He played college football at Appalachian State.

== Early life ==
Peoples attended Central High School of Clay County in Lineville, Alabama. As a senior, he rushed for 1,672 yards and 21 touchdowns on 230 carries, as well as a punt and kickoff return for a touchdown. Peoples committed to Appalachian State to play college football.

== College career ==
In five years at Appalachian State, Peoples rushed for 2,830 yards and 33 touchdowns on 455 carries and added 11 receptions for 77 yards. In the 2019 season opener against East Tennessee State, he suffered a season-ending ACL tear. Peoples best season was in the 2020 where he rushed for 1,124 yards and 12 touchdowns on 168 carries and caught three passes for 15 yards to earn second-team All-Sun Belt honors. In 2021 he rushed for 926 yards and 14 touchdowns on 166 carries and added two catches for 19 yards to again earn second-team All-Sun Belt honors. After the 2022 season, People declared for the upcoming NFL draft.

During his time at Appalachian State, Peoples finished 2nd all-time in rushing touchdowns, 4th all-time in rushing yards, and 4th all-time in carries.

== Professional career ==
Pre-draft measurables
Height	Weight	Arm length	Hand span	40-yard dash	10-yard split	20-yard split	20-yard shuttle	Three-cone drill	Vertical jump	Broad jump	Bench press
6 ft 1 1/3 in (1.86 m)	217 lb (98 kg)	32 5/8 in (0.83 m)	9 3/4 in (0.25 m)	4.61 s	1.56 s	2.65 s	4.56 s	7.57 s	37 in (0.94 m)	10 ft 1 in (3.07 m)	19 reps
All values from NFL Scouting Combine/Pro Day

After not being selected in the 2023 NFL draft, Peoples signed with the Carolina Panthers as an undrafted free agent. He was waived on August 26, 2023.

Peoples signed with the Edmonton Elks on February 16, 2024. He was released on June 3, 2024.

== Coaching career ==
Peoples signed with Athletes Untapped as a private football coach on Dec 11, 2024.
