= Demetrius Taylor =

American football player (born 1999)

No. 73 – BC Lions
- Position: Defensive tackle
- Roster status: Suspended
- CFL status: American

Personal information
- Born: May 27, 1999 (age 27); Miami, Florida, U.S.
- Listed height: 6 ft 1 in (1.85 m)
- Listed weight: 295 lb (134 kg)

Career information
- High school: Miami Northwestern Senior
- College: Appalachian State
- NFL draft: 2022: undrafted

Career history
- Detroit Lions (2022); BC Lions (2024)*; Birmingham Stallions (2025)*; BC Lions (2025–present)
- * Offseason or practice squad member only

Awards and highlights
- First-team All-Sun Belt (2019-2021)
- Stats at Pro Football Reference

Demetrius Latron Taylor (born May 27, 1999) is an American professional football defensive tackle for the BC Lions of the Canadian Football League (CFL). He played college football at Appalachian State.

== College career ==
Taylor played at Appalachian State from 2017 to 2021. He led the Sun Belt Conference with three forced fumbles in the 2019 season.

== Professional career ==
Pre-draft measurables
Height	Weight	Arm length	Hand span	Wingspan	40-yard dash	10-yard split	20-yard split	20-yard shuttle	Three-cone drill	Vertical jump	Broad jump	Bench press
6 ft 0 1/8 in (1.83 m)	289 lb (131 kg)	32 3/8 in (0.82 m)	9 3/4 in (0.25 m)	6 ft 6 in (1.98 m)	5.07 s	1.69 s	2.90 s	4.50 s	8.03 s	30.0 in (0.76 m)	8 ft 10 in (2.69 m)	27 reps
All values from Pro Day

=== Detroit Lions ===
Taylor signed with the Detroit Lions as an undrafted free agent on April 30, 2022, following the 2022 NFL draft. He made the Lions' final 53-man roster out of training camp. He was waived on October 27, 2022, and re-signed to the practice squad. He signed a reserve/future contract on January 9, 2023. He was released on May 10, 2023. Taylor was suspended for the entire 2023 NFL season due to violating the league's gambling policy.

On April 18, 2024, Taylor was reinstated by the NFL.

=== BC Lions (first stint) ===
On May 28, 2024, Taylor was signed by the BC Lions of the Canadian Football League. He was released on June 2, 2024.

=== Birmingham Stallions ===
On July 23, 2024, Taylor signed with the Birmingham Stallions of the United Football League (UFL). He was released on March 20, 2025.

=== BC Lions (second stint) ===
On April 22, 2025, Taylor re-signed with the Lions. On May 11, 2025, Taylor was suspended by the CFL for the entire 2025 and 2026 CFL seasons.
