= Nick Hampton =

American football player (born 2000)

No. 39 – Carolina Panthers
- Position: Linebacker
- Roster status: Practice squad

Personal information
- Born: April 5, 2000 (age 26); Anderson, South Carolina, U.S.
- Listed height: 6 ft 3 in (1.91 m)
- Listed weight: 251 lb (114 kg)

Career information
- High school: Westside (Anderson)
- College: Appalachian State (2018–2022)
- NFL draft: 2023: 5th round, 161st overall pick

Career history
- Los Angeles Rams (2023–2025); Carolina Panthers (2026–present)

Awards and highlights
- First-team All-Sun Belt (2022); Third-team All-Sun Belt (2021)

Career NFL statistics as of Week 8, 2026
- Total tackles: 23
- Fumble recoveries: 1
- Pass deflections: 2
- Stats at Pro Football Reference

Nicholas Hampton (born April 5, 2000) is an American professional football linebacker for the Carolina Panthers of the National Football League (NFL). He played college football for the Appalachian State Mountaineers, and began his professional career playing three seasons (2023-2025) with the Los Angeles Rams, who drafted him in the fifth round of the 2023 NFL draft.

== Early life ==
Hampton grew up in Anderson, South Carolina and attended Westside High School. He had 63 tackles, 16 for loss, and seven sacks in his junior season. Hampton committed to play college football at Appalachian State.

== College career ==
Hampton played in three games as a true freshman while maintaining a redshirt on the season. He made 42 tackles with three sacks during his redshirt freshman season. As a redshirt junior, Hampton was named third team All-Sun Belt Conference after finishing the season with 69 tackles, 17.5 tackles for loss, and 11 sacks.

== Professional career ==
Pre-draft measurables
Height	Weight	Arm length	Hand span	Wingspan	40-yard dash	10-yard split	20-yard split	Vertical jump	Broad jump
6 ft 2 1/4 in (1.89 m)	236 lb (107 kg)	33 5/8 in (0.85 m)	9 1/2 in (0.24 m)	6 ft 8 5/8 in (2.05 m)	4.58 s	1.65 s	2.61 s	35.5 in (0.90 m)	10 ft 0 in (3.05 m)
All values from NFL Combine

=== Los Angeles Rams ===
Hampton was selected by the Los Angeles Rams with the 161st pick in the fifth round of the 2023 NFL draft. As a rookie, he appeared in 10 games and contributed four total tackles with one pass deflection. In 2024, Hampton appeared in 14 games and had three total tackles and a pass defense, but did not appear in any playof games for Los Angeles.

In his third season with the Rams, played in 12 games and had 10 total tackles. On December 9, 2025, Hampton was waived by the Rams and re-signed to the practice squad. On January 13, 2026, he was signed to the active roster for the postseason. Hampton appeared in all three of the Rams' playoff games, totaling three tackles (one solo, two assists) for the 2025 season.

=== Carolina Panthers ===
On March 20, 2026, Hampton signed with the Carolina Panthers. On August 17, he was waived by Carolina with an injury settlement. He was signed to the practice squad on October 6. He was promoted to the active roster on October 26. He was waived on November 14 and re-signed to the practice squad four days later.

== NFL career statistics ==
Legend
**Bold**	Career high

=== Regular season ===
Year	Team	Games		Tackles					Interceptions						Fumbles				
Year	Team	GP	GS	Cmb	Solo	Ast	Sck	TFL	Int	Yds	Avg	Lng	TD	PD	FF	Fum	FR	Yds	TD
2023	LAR	10	0	4	2	2	0.0	0	0	0	0.0	0	0	**1**	0	0	0	0	0
2024	LAR	**14**	0	3	2	1	0.0	0	0	0	0.0	0	0	**1**	0	0	0	0	0
2025	LAR	12	0	**10**	**4**	**6**	0.0	0	0	0	0.0	0	0	0	0	0	0	0	0
Career		36	0	17	8	9	0.0	0	0	0	0.0	0	0	2	0	0	0	0	0

=== Postseason ===
Year	Team	Games		Tackles					Interceptions						Fumbles				
Year	Team	GP	GS	Cmb	Solo	Ast	Sck	TFL	Int	Yds	Avg	Lng	TD	PD	FF	Fum	FR	Yds	TD
2023	LAR	1	0	0	0	0	0.0	0	0	0	0.0	0	0	0	0	0	0	0	0
2025	LAR	**3**	0	**3**	**1**	**2**	0.0	0	0	0	0.0	0	0	0	0	0	0	0	0
Career		4	0	3	1	2	0.0	0	0	0	0.0	0	0	0	0	0	0	0	0
