= Central High School of Clay County =

Location
- 1 Bob Riley Drive; Lineville, Alabama 36266; United States
- 33.289624°N 85.787603°W

Information
- Type: Comprehensive Public High School
- Established: 2012 (14 years ago)
- School district: Clay County School District
- CEEB code: 011655
- Principal: Chad Murphy
- Teaching staff: 31.16 (FTE)
- Grades: 9–12
- Enrollment: 546 (2023–2024)
- Student to teacher ratio: 17.52
- Campus type: Suburban
- Colors: Navy and red
- Mascot: Volunteers
- Website: www.centralhigh-clay.org

The Central High School of Clay County, or Clay Central, is a public, 5A division school located in Lineville in east central Alabama. It is in the Clay County School District (Alabama). The school opened in 2012 and is the largest school in the eastern region. In 2025 it had about 550 students in grades 9 to 12. About 72 percent of students were white and 17 percent black.

Volunteers are the mascot. Danny Horn, the winningest coach in Alabama High School Athletic Association history, is the football coach. The school has a marching band.

== History ==
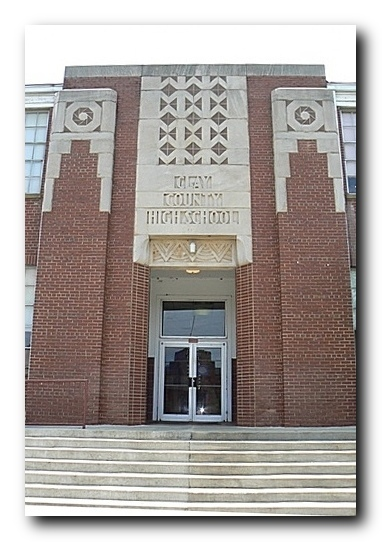
Clay County High School (Now Closed)

Clay County High School in Ashland, Alabama preceded the school. Steve Giddens attended. Clay County Training School in Lineville was open to black students in the county until desegregation.
