= Steven Jones Jr. =

American football player (born 1999)

Profile
- Position: Cornerback

Personal information
- Born: February 1, 1999 (age 27); Rockingham, North Carolina, U.S.
- Listed height: 5 ft 10 in (1.78 m)
- Listed weight: 183 lb (83 kg)

Career information
- High school: Richmond Senior (NC)
- College: Appalachian State (2017–2022)
- NFL draft: 2023: undrafted

Career history
- Tennessee Titans (2023)*; Arlington / Dallas Renegades (2024–2026)
- * Offseason or practice squad member only

Awards and highlights
- First-team All-American (2021); First-team All-Sun Belt (2021); Second-team All-Sun Belt (2022)

Career spring football statistics as of Week 10, 2025
- Total Tackles: 52
- Solo Tackles: 45
- Tackles for Loss: 2
- Interceptions: 2
- Pass Breakups: 12
- Forced Fumbles: 1

Steven Sedgewon Jones Jr. (born February 1, 1999) is an American professional football cornerback. He played college football at Appalachian State.

== Early life ==
Jones was born on February 1, 1999, in Rockingham, North Carolina. He attended Richmond Senior High School where he made 35 tackles and three interceptions as a senior, earning all-conference honors. He was rated a two-star cornerback by 247Sports and Scout.com.

== College career ==
Jones committed to Appalachian State University, spending his first season as a redshirt. In his second year, 2018, he appeared in 13 games, mainly on special teams. In a 72–7 win over Gardner–Webb, he blocked two punts and returned one for his first career touchdown. His performance earned him Sun Belt Conference Special Team Player of the Week honors. He made five tackles in the season.

As a sophomore in 2019, Jones started two games and appeared in a total of 13, making seven tackles. He played in every games in the following season, being the third cornerback on the team's depth chart. He returned interceptions for 97 total yards and scored a touchdown against Troy. He also served as the Appalachian State kick returner, averaging 21.9 yards per return.

As a senior in 2021, Jones appeared in all 14 games and started all but one. He made 51 tackles and ranked top 20 in the nation for passes defended with 13. In a game against Arkansas State, he made three interceptions and returned two for touchdowns, earning the Walter Camp and Bronko Nagurski awards for best defensive player of the week. He placed second in the nation and first in his conference with five interceptions on the year, and was first nationally in interceptions returned for touchdowns. At the end of the year, Jones was named first-team All-American by the Football Writers Association of America. He was also a first-team all-conference selection.

== Professional career ==
Pre-draft measurables
Height	Weight	Arm length	Hand span	Wingspan	40-yard dash	10-yard split	20-yard split	20-yard shuttle	Three-cone drill	Vertical jump	Broad jump	Bench press
5 ft 9 7/8 in (1.77 m)	188 lb (85 kg)	30 in (0.76 m)	7 3/4 in (0.20 m)	6 ft 0 3/4 in (1.85 m)	4.51 s	1.63 s	2.44 s	4.38 s	7.51 s	35.0 in (0.89 m)	10 ft 4 in (3.15 m)	14 reps
All values from Pro Day

=== Tennessee Titans ===
Jones was signed by the Tennessee Titans as an undrafted free agent on May 12, 2023. He was waived by the Titans as a part of final roster cuts on August 29.

=== Arlington Renegades ===
On December 20, 2023, Jones signed with the Arlington Renegades of the XFL. He re-signed with the team on October 8, 2024.
