= Shaun Jolly =

American football player (born 1998)

Profile
- Position: Cornerback

Personal information
- Born: October 17, 1998 (age 28); Stone Mountain, Georgia, U.S.
- Listed height: 5 ft 9 in (1.75 m)
- Listed weight: 186 lb (84 kg)

Career information
- High school: Stephenson (DeKalb County, Georgia)
- College: Appalachian State (2017–2021)
- NFL draft: 2022: undrafted

Career history
- Cleveland Browns (2022)*; Los Angeles Rams (2022–2024)
- * Offseason or practice squad member only

Awards and highlights
- 3× First-team All-Sun Belt (2019, 2020, 2021)

Career NFL statistics as of 2024
- Games played: 6
- Stats at Pro Football Reference

Shaun Jolly (born October 17, 1998) is an American professional football cornerback. He played college football for the Appalachian State Mountaineers and was signed as an undrafted free agent by the Cleveland Browns in 2022.

== Early life ==
Shaun Jolly was born on October 17, 1998, in Stone Mountain, Georgia. Jolly attended Stephenson High School and had a successful high school tenure, being named to the Georgia all-star team.

== College career ==
Jolly was rated as a two-star cornerback by Scout.com and chose to attend Appalachian State University. Jolly redshirted his freshman year and never played a down that season. In his next year, Jolly played in eleven games in defensive and special teams roles, including playing in the New Orleans Bowl against Middle Tennessee. Jolly was highly rated in his sophomore year, being named a second-team All-American and first-team all Sun Belt Conference for having five interceptions on the year and two interceptions returned for touchdowns. In Jolly's junior year he was named an honorable All-American and started all twelve games with 41 tackles and six pass breakups. In Jolly's senior and final year, he started all nine of the games he appeared in and was first-team All-Sun Belt.

== Professional career ==
Pre-draft measurables
| Height | Weight | Arm length | Hand span | 40-yard dash | 10-yard split | 20-yard split | 20-yard shuttle | Three-cone drill | Vertical jump | Broad jump |
|---|---|---|---|---|---|---|---|---|---|---|
| 5 ft 8 3/4 in (1.75 m) | 179 lb (81 kg) | 30 3/8 in (0.77 m) | 9 1/8 in (0.23 m) | 4.52 s | 1.59 s | 2.58 s | 4.13 s | 6.95 s | 36.5 in (0.93 m) | 10 ft 4 in (3.15 m) |
All values from Pro Day

=== Cleveland Browns ===
After going undrafted in the 2022 NFL draft, Jolly was signed as an undrafted free agent by the Cleveland Browns. Jolly did not make the active roster but was signed to the practice squad.

=== Los Angeles Rams ===
On September 23, 2022, Jolly was signed from the practice squad of the Browns to the active roster of the Los Angeles Rams.

On March 15, 2023, Jolly was tendered by the Rams. He was re-signed on April 17, 2023. He was waived on September 5, 2023. He was re-signed to the practice squad on October 19. Jolly was signed to the active roster on November 28.

Jolly was waived by the Rams on August 27, 2024, and re-signed to the practice squad. He signed a reserve/future contract on January 20, 2025.

On August 26, 2025, Jolly was waived by the Rams with an injury designation as part of final roster cuts. Jolly went unclaimed off waivers and was placed on injured reserve the following day. On September 1st, 2025, he was released from the IR with an injury settlement.
