= Frank Ponce =

American football player and coach (born 1971)

Current position
- Title: Associate head coach & tight ends coach
- Team: FIU
- Conference: C-USA

Biographical details
- Born: April 3, 1971 (age 55)
- Education: Florida International University

Playing career
- 1989–1990: Arizona Western
- Position: Quarterback

Coaching career (HC unless noted)
- 1992: La Progresiva Presbyterian (FL) (OC)
- 1993–1996: Coral Gables HS (FL) (QB/WR)
- 1998: Miami Northwestern HS (FL) (QB)
- 1999–2000: Miami Central (FL) (OC/QB)
- 2002–2003: Coral Reef (FL)
- 2004–2006: Miami HS (FL)
- 2007–2012: FIU (WR)
- 2013–2018: Appalachian State (co-OC/QB)
- 2019–2020: Louisville (QB)
- 2021: Appalachian State (OC/QB)
- 2022: Miami (FL) (PGC/QB)
- 2023–2024: Appalachian State (OC/QB)
- 2025–present: FIU (AHC/TE)

Head coaching record
- Overall: 20–28

Frank Ponce (born April 3, 1971) is an American college football coach. He is the associate head coach and tight ends coach for Florida International University, positions he has held since 2025. He previously was the offensive coordinator and quarterbacks coach for the Mountaineers from 2013 to 2018, in 2021 and again from 2023 to 2024. He was the head football coach for Coral Reef Senior High School from 2002 to 2003 and Miami Senior High School from 2004 to 2006. He also coached for La Progresiva Presbyterian School, Coral Gables Senior High school, Miami Northwestern Senior High School, Miami Central Senior High School, FIU, Louisville, and Miami (FL). He played college football for Arizona Western as a quarterback.

== Head coaching record ==
Year	Team	Overall	Conference	Standing	Bowl/playoffs
Coral Reef Barracudas () (2002–2003)
2002	Coral Reef	5–5			
2003	Coral Reef	5–5			
Coral Reef:		10–10			
Miami Stingarees () (2004–2006)
2004	Miami	5–5	3–1	2nd	
2005	Miami	2–6	1–4	6th	
2006	Miami	3–7	2–3	4th	
Miami:		10–18	6–8		
Total:		20–28			
