= Jalen Virgil =

American football player (born 1998)

Profile
- Position: Wide receiver

Personal information
- Born: July 13, 1998 (age 28); Lawrenceville, Georgia, U.S.
- Listed height: 6 ft 0 in (1.83 m)
- Listed weight: 210 lb (95 kg)

Career information
- High school: Mountain View (Lawrenceville)
- College: Appalachian State (2016–2021)
- NFL draft: 2022: undrafted

Career history
- Denver Broncos (2022–2023); Buffalo Bills (2024); Arizona Cardinals (2025)*; Buffalo Bills (2026)*
- * Offseason or practice squad member only

Awards and highlights
- Second-team All-Sun Belt (2021)

Career NFL statistics as of 2025
- Receptions: 2
- Receiving yards: 75
- Receiving touchdowns: 1
- Stats at Pro Football Reference

Jalen Lorenzo Virgil (born July 13, 1998) is an American professional football wide receiver. He played college football for the Appalachian State Mountaineers.

== College career ==
Virgil was a member of the Appalachian State Mountaineers for six seasons, redshirting his true freshman season. In his final season, he caught 15 passes for 226 yards and one touchdown and returned 26 kickoffs for a school-record 781 yards and two touchdowns.

== Professional career ==
Pre-draft measurables
| Height | Weight | Arm length | Hand span | Wingspan | 40-yard dash | 10-yard split | 20-yard split | 20-yard shuttle | Three-cone drill | Vertical jump | Broad jump | Bench press |
|---|---|---|---|---|---|---|---|---|---|---|---|---|
| 6 ft 0 1/8 in (1.83 m) | 207 lb (94 kg) | 31 1/2 in (0.80 m) | 9 3/8 in (0.24 m) | 6 ft 3 3/8 in (1.91 m) | 4.40 s | 1.59 s | 2.56 s | 4.35 s | 7.15 s | 36.5 in (0.93 m) | 10 ft 10 in (3.30 m) | 19 reps |
All values from Pro Day

=== Denver Broncos ===
Virgil signed with the Denver Broncos as an undrafted free agent on April 30, 2022. He made the Broncos' initial 53-man roster out of training camp. On November 13, Virgil scored a 66-yard touchdown on his first career reception during a 17–10 loss to the Tennessee Titans.

On August 22, 2023, Virgil was placed on injured reserve, ending his season.

On August 27, 2024, Virgil was waived by the Broncos as a part of final roster cuts.

=== Buffalo Bills ===
On August 28, 2024, Virgil was signed to the Buffalo Bills' practice squad. He was promoted to the active roster on November 8. Virgil was released by the Bills on December 14, and re-signed to the practice squad.

Virgil signed a reserve/future contract with Buffalo on January 28, 2025. On August 14, Virgil was waived by the Bills with an injury designation.

=== Arizona Cardinals ===
On November 12, 2025, Virgil signed with the Arizona Cardinals' practice squad. He was released by the Cardinals on November 19.

=== DC Defenders ===
On January 14, 2026, Virgil was selected by the DC Defenders of the United Football League (UFL).

=== Buffalo Bills (second stint) ===
On February 10, 2026, Virgil signed a reserve/futures contract with the Buffalo Bills. Virgil was waived by Buffalo on July 30, with an undisclosed non-football injury.
