= Henry Pearson (American football) =

American football player (born 1999)

Profile
- Position: Tight end

Personal information
- Born: November 23, 1999 (age 26); Ho-Ho-Kus, New Jersey, U.S.
- Listed height: 6 ft 2 in (1.88 m)
- Listed weight: 249 lb (113 kg)

Career information
- High school: Paramus Catholic (Bergen County, New Jersey)
- College: Appalachian State (2018–2022)
- NFL draft: 2023: undrafted

Career history
- Green Bay Packers (2023)

Career NFL statistics
- Games played: 2
- Stats at Pro Football Reference

Henry Pearson (born November 23, 1999) is an American professional football tight end. He played college football for the Appalachian State Mountaineers.

== College career ==
In Pearson's five year career at Appalachian State he notched 74 receptions for 897 yards and 11 touchdowns, while also totalling six tackles.

== Professional career ==
Pre-draft measurables
Height	Weight	Arm length	Hand span	40-yard dash	10-yard split	20-yard split	20-yard shuttle	Three-cone drill	Vertical jump	Broad jump	Bench press
6 ft 2 3/8 in (1.89 m)	249 lb (113 kg)	31 1/2 in (0.80 m)	10 in (0.25 m)	4.80 s	1.76 s	2.69 s	4.50 s	7.51 s	31 in (0.79 m)	10 ft 0 in (3.05 m)	30 reps
All values from Pro Day

After not being selected in the 2023 NFL draft, Pearson signed with the Green Bay Packers as an undrafted free agent. However, Pearson was released during final roster cuts, but signed to the Packers practice squad the next day. On November 22, 2023, Pearson was elevated from the practice squad for their week twelve matchup versus the Detroit Lions. On the next day, Pearson made his NFL debut playing 13 total snaps in a win. The following day, Pearson was sent back down to the practice squad. He signed a reserve/future contract on January 22, 2024. On July 30, 2024, he was released. He was signed back by the Packers on August 20, 2024. He was released on August 27, 2024.
